= Nusrat Fateh Ali Khan discography =

Most of Nusrat Fateh Ali Khan's early music was recorded with Rehmat Gramophone House later turned RGH Label. Throughout the ’70s and early ’80s Nusrat Fateh Ali Khan released hundreds of cassettes, most of them containing one or two lengthy songs. Chris Nickson, of Global Rhythm, argues that trying to make order of Khan's entire discography would be a nightmare.

Nusrat Fateh recorded hundreds of albums around the globe. OSA, Birmingham released about 125 audio albums and 30-35 concert films. His international labels included Real World Records, Virgin Music, Ocora, World Music Network, Shanachie, Nascente, American Records, EMI Arabia & France. He recorded 40-50 cassettes in Pakistan, many of which are available under the EMI Label. More than two decades after his death, music companies around the world are releasing new albums every year.

== Albums ==
=== OSA Releases ===
- Vol 1, Best of Shahenshah
- Vol 2, Tumhain Dillagi Bhool
- Vol 3, Je Toon Rab Noon Manana
- Vol 4, Wadah Kar Ke Sahjjan
- Gorakh Dhanda - Vol 05
- Yadon ke Sayeay - Vol 06
- Jani Door Gaye - Vol 07
- House of Shah - Vol 08
- Dam Dam Ali Ali - Vol 9
- Jhoole Laal - Vol 10
- Marhaba Marhaba - Vol 11
- Magic Touch - Vol 12
- Shabads - Vol 13
- Mast Qalander - Vol 14
- Maikadah - Vol 15
- Bari Bari - Vol 16
- Nit Khair Mangan - Vol 17
- Mae Ni Mae - Vol 18
- Sham Savere - Vol 19
- Naat - Vol 20
- Bulle Shah - Vol 21
- Aansoo - Vol 22
- Mighty Khan - Vol 23
- Dhol Mahia - Vol 24
- Allah Hoo - Vol 25
- Chithhi - Vol 26
- Kali Kali Zulfon - Vol 27
- Sanson Ki Mala - Vol 28
- Saqi Mere Saqi - Vol 29
- Vird Karo Allah Allah - Vol 30
- Akhian - Vol 31
- Beh Ja Mahi - Vol 32
- Neendran - Vol 33
- Sanam - Vol 34
- Mere Man Ka Raja - Vol 35
- Piya Ghar Aaya - Vol 36
- Washington University - Vol 37
- Mast Nazron Se - Vol 38
- House of Shah 2 - Vol 39
- Kande Utte Mehrman Way - Vol 40
- Yadan - Vol 41
- Jana Jogi De Naal - Vol 42
- Ali Maula - Vol 43
- Tere Main Ishq Nachaian
- Charkha Naulakha - Vol 45
- Kehde Ghar Jawan - Vol 46
- House Of Shah 3 - Vol 47
- Jewel - Vol 48
- Mighty Khan 2 - Vol 49
- Must Mast 2 - Vol 50
- Bandit Queen - Vol 51
- Prem Deewani - Vol 52
- Kalam-e-Iqbal - Vol 53
- Ya Hayyo Ya Qayyum - Vol 54
- Chan Sajna - Vol 55
- Loay Loay Aaja Mahi - Vol 56
- Wohi Khuda Hai - Vol 57
- Pilao Saqi - Vol 58
- Samandar Maen Samandar - Vol 59
- Ishq - Vol 60
- Piala - Vol 61
- Kulli Yar Dee - Vol 62
- Gali Wichoon Kaun Langia - Vol 63
- Sufi Qawwalies - Vol 64
- Pyar Karte Hain - Vol 65
- Sorrows - Vol 69

=== Major international releases ===
- 1988. In Concert in Paris, Vol 1. Ocora.
- 1988. Shahen-Shah. RealWorld/CEMA.
- 1990. Mustt Mustt. RealWorld/CEMA. Collaboration with Michael Brook.
- 1991. Magic Touch OSA.
- 1991. Shahbaaz. RealWorld/CEMA.
- 1991. The Day, The Night, The Dawn, The Dusk. Shanachie Records.
- 1992. Devotional Songs. Real World Records.
- 1992. Love Songs. EMI.
- 1993. Ilham. Audiorec.
- 1993. Traditional Sufi Qawwalis: Live in London, Vol. 2. Navras Records.
- 1994. Pakistan: Vocal Art of the Sufis, Vol 2 – Qawwali. JVC.
- 1994. Nusrat Fateh Ali Khan & Party. Real World Records.
- 1994. The Last Prophet. Real World Records.
- 1994. Traditional Sufi Qawwalis: Live in London, Vol. 4. Navras Records.
- 1995. Revelation. Interra/Intersound.
- 1995. Back to Qawwali. Long Distance
- 1996. In Concert in Paris, Vol. 3–5. Ocora.
- 1996. Qawwali: The Art of the Sufis. JVC
- 1996. Night Song. Real World Records.
- 1996. Dead Man Walking: The Score. Columbia/Sony
- 1996. Intoxicated Spirit. Shanachie Records.
- 1996. Mega Star. Interra.
- 1996. Bandit Queen. Milan.
- 1996. The Prophet Speaks. M.I.L. Multimedia.
- 1996. Sangam. EMI.
- 1997. Live In India. RPG.
- 1997. Akhian. M.I.L. Multimedia.
- 1997. Live in New York City. M.I.L. Multimedia.
- 1997. Farewell Song: Alwadah. M.I.L. Multimedia.
- 1997. In Concert in Paris, Vol 2. Ocora.
- 1997. Oriente/Occidente: Gregorian Chant & Qawwali Music. Materiali Sonori.
- 1997. Dust to Gold, Realworld Recordings.
- 1998. Allah & The Prophet. Ex Works.
- 1998. Star Rise: Remixes. EMI.
- 1998. Live at Royal Albert Hall. M.I.L. Multimedia.
- 1998. Missives from Allah. BCD.
- 1998. Imprint: In Concert. Hi Horse Records. (Selections from the 23 January 1993 concert at Meany Hall, University of Washington in Seattle, during Khan's residency at their Ethnomusicology program.)
- 1999. Peace. Omni Parc.
- 1999. Live at Islamabad, Vol 1–2. M.I.L. Multimedia.
- 1999. Passion. NYC Music.
- 1999. Visions of Allah. Ex Works.
- 1999. Swan Song. Narada.
- 2000. Jewel. MoviePlay.
- 2000. Live in London, Vol 3. Navras Records.
- 2001. Opus. Vanstory.
- 2001. The Final Studio Recordings. Legacy/Sony.
- 2001. Pukaar: The Echo. Navras Records.
- 2001. The Final Moment. Birdman Records.
- 2002. Body and Sou. RealWorld/CEMA.
- 2002. Sufi Qawwalis. Arc Music.
- 2004. Allah Hoo. Saregama.
- 2004. Aur Pyar Ho Gaya. Saregama.
- 2004. Ishq Da Rutba. Saregama.
- 2004. Kartoos. Saregama.
- 2004. Main Aur Meri Awargi. Saregama.
- 2004. Ye Jo Halka. Saregama.
- 2005. Nami Danam. JVC Compact Discs.
- 2010. Mitter Pyare Nu. Nupur Audio.
- 2024. Chain of Light. Real World
- 2026. Love and Devotion. Real World (Double vinyl reissue of the 1992 albums Love Songs and Devotional Songs)

=== Album features ===
- Passion (1989) – with Peter Gabriel
- Only One (1997) – with Mahmood Khan
- Vande Mataram (1997) – with A. R. Rahman

=== Film soundtracks ===
Bollywood soundtracks

- Bandit Queen (1994)
- Aur Pyaar Ho Gaya (1997)
- Kartoos (1999)
- Kachche Dhaage (1999)
- Dillagi (1999)
- Dhadkan (2000)

Western soundtracks

- Last Temptation of Christ (1988)
- Dead Man Walking (1996)
- Bend It Like Beckham (2002)

== Singles ==
- Sohna Mukhra Vol. 82 - OSA
- Saqi Mere Saqi Vol. 29 - OSA
- Jana Jogi De Nal Vol 42. - OSA
- Jewel Vol 48. - OSA
- Masoom Vol. 66 - OSA
- Tauba - Hi-Tech Music
- Mere Rashke Qamar - Hi-Tech Music
- Mere Rashke Qamar (Complete Original Version) - Hi-Tech Music
- Mere Rashke Qamar (Duet Version ft. Naseebo Lal) - Hi-Tech Music
- Mere Rashke Qamar (ft. Rahat Fateh Ali Khan) - Hi-Tech Music
- Mere Rashke Qamar (Remix) - Hi-Tech Music
- Shikwa/Jawab-e-Shikwa Vol.72 - OSA
- Rehmat Ka Jhoomer Vol. 108 - OSA
- Haq Ali Ali Vol. 126 - OSA
- Sochta Hoon - Hi-Tech Music
- Dard-e-Gham - Venus Worldwide Entertainment
- Main Khuda Ki Sanaa Gaon Ga - MRC
- Mast Mast (Massive Attack Remix) - Real World Records/Virgin
- Dama Dum Mast - OSA

== Films ==
=== Documentaries ===
- Nusrat Fateh Ali Khan: le dernier prophète (1996). Directed by Jérôme de Missolz.
- Nusrat has Left the Building... But When? (1997). Directed by Farjad Nabi. (This 20-minute docudrama focuses on Khan's early career.)
- A Voice from Heaven (1999). Directed by Giuseppe Asaro. New York, NY: Winstar TV & Video. (This 75-minute documentary, available on VHS and DVD, provides an introduction to Khan's life and work.)
- Samandar Main Samandar (2007). A documentary aired on Geo TV detailing Khan's career.
- The King of Qawalli (2009). A short film aired on Dawn News about Khan's life and career.

=== Concert films ===
- The JVC Video Anthology of World Music and Dance (1990). Video 14 (of 30) (South Asia IV). Produced by Ichikawa Katsumori; directed by Nakagawa Kunikiko and Ichihashi Yuji; in collaboration with the National Museum of Ethnology, Osaka. [Tokyo]: JVC, Victor Company of Japan; Cambridge, Massachusetts: distributed by Rounder Records. Features a studio performance by Khan and Party (two Urdu-language songs: a Hamd, and a Manqabat for Khwaja Mu'inuddin Chishti. Filmed in Tokyo, Japan, 20 September 1987, for Asian Traditional Performing Arts).
- Nusrat! Live at Meany (1998). Produced by the University of Washington. 87-minute recording of a concert of 23 January 1993 at Meany Hall, University of Washington in Seattle, during Khan's residency at the ethnomusicology program there.
- Live in Concert in the UK, (DVD, vols. 1–17) [OSA]; recorded between 1983 and 1993
- Akhiyan Udeek Diyan (DVD) [Nupur Audio]
- Je Tun Rab Nu Manauna (DVD) [Nupur Audio]
- Yaadan Vicchre Sajan Diyan Aayiyan (DVD) [Nupur Audio]
- Rang-e-Nusrat (DVD, vols. 1–11) [Music Today]; recorded between 1983 and 1993 (same material as the OSA DVDs)
- VHS videotapes, vols. 1–21 [OSA]; recorded between 1983 and 1993 (same material as the OSA DVDs)
  - Luxor Cinema Birmingham (VHS vol. 1, 1979)
  - Digbeth Birmingham (VHS vol. 2, 1983)
  - St. Francis Hall Birmingham (VHS vol. 3, 1983)
  - Royal Oak Birmingham (VHS vol. 4, 1983)
  - Private Mehfil (Wallace Lawley Centre, Lozells Birmingham, November 1983) (VHS vol. 5)
  - Private Mehfil (VHS vol. 6, 1983)
  - Natraj Cinema Leicester (VHS vol. 7, 1983)
  - Live in Southall (VHS vol. 8)
  - Live in Bradford (VHS vol. 9, 1983)
  - Live in Birmingham (VHS vol. 10, 1985)
  - Allah Ditta Hall (VHS vol. 11, 1985)
  - Harrow Leisure Centre (VHS vol. 12)
  - University of Aston (VHS vol. 13, 1988)
  - Aston University (VHS vol. 14, 1988)
  - WOMAD Festival Bracknell (VHS vol. 15, 1988)
  - Live in Paris (VHS vol. 16, 1988)
  - Poplar Civic Centre London (VHS vol. 17)
  - Imperial Hotel Birmingham (VHS vol. 18, 1985)
  - Slough Gurdawara (SHABADS) (VHS vol. 19)
  - Imran Khan Cancer Appeal (VHS vol. 20)
  - Town Hall Birmingham (VHS vol. 21, 1993)

== Sales ==
The following are known sales of records with songs credited to Nusrat Fateh Ali Khan, either as a vocalist, composer, or special thanks.

Credited
Year	Title	Sales	Ref	Region(s)
1996	Sangam	1,000,000		India
1997	Only One	6,000,000		Worldwide
1997	Vande Mataram	2,000,000		Worldwide
1997	Aur Pyaar Ho Gaya	1,500,000		India
1997	"Afreen Afreen"	500,000		India
1999	Kachche Dhaage	3,000,000		India
2000	Dhadkan	4,500,000		India
2007	Guru	1,150,000		India
	Total known sales	19,650,000		Worldwide

The following are known Indian sales of Bollywood soundtrack albums featuring copied versions of songs originally composed by Nusrat Fateh Ali Khan, without crediting him.

Uncredited
Year	Title	Sales	Ref
1994	Mohra	8,000,000	
1995	Yaraana	2,000,000	
1996	Raja Hindustani	11,000,000	
1996	Auzaar	2,200,000	
1997	Judaai	2,000,000	
1997	Koyla	1,800,000	
	Total known sales	27,000,000	

== See also ==
- Rahat Fateh Ali Khan discography
