= Nusrat Fateh Ali Khan & Party =

Pakistani qawwali musical group (1960s–1997)

- Origin: Jalandhar, British India (Note: The group was originally formed by Nusrat's father Fateh Ali Khan (1904–1964). See history section and The Daily Star Bangladesh)
- Genres: Qawwali, Sufi music, World music
- Works: albums
- Years active: 1960s–1997
- Labels: Real World Records, Oriental Star Agencies

Nusrat Fateh Ali Khan & Party, also known as Nusrat Fateh Ali Khan Qawwal Party, was a Pakistani musical group, led by singer Nusrat Fateh Ali Khan. The group is credited with popularizing the genre of Sufi devotional music outside South Asia. Under the core lineup of Nusrat, the group earned international recognition, performing in major cultural venues and collaborating with artists from various musical traditions. They introduced various musical techniques, such as fusion with traditional qawwali, which contributed to the evolution of the genre. Active during the 20th century, their contributions to world music is recognised one of the prominent contributions in the history of Sufi music.

The group, which comprised 11 to 13 members with many being related to Nusrat Fateh Ali Khan Sahab. Some of the group members were as follows; Farrukh Fateh Ali Khan, Mujahid Mubarak Ali Khan, Atta Fareed, Dildar Hussain, Rahat Fateh Ali Khan and Nusrat himself. They gained international attention with their performance at the 1985 WOMAD festival on Mersea Island. It was the first time the group performed in front of a predominantly non-Asian audience, introducing qawwali to a non-Urdu speaking people. The performance, which took place at midnight, contributed to gain attention in the Western world such as the USA and the UK explicitly. This event helped elevate its profile in the Western nations and established a connection with WOMAD, and Real World Records, contributing to their continued work outside Pakistan.

== History ==
Nusrat Fateh Ali Khan was born in 1948 in Lyallpur, West Punjab, Pakistan, and belonged to the Qawwal Bacchon Ka Gharana (Commonly known as the "Qawwal Bacha Party" or the "Delhi Gharana), a qawwali group of 12 children said to have been assembled by the Sufi poet Amir Khusro in the 13th century. Nusrat was the son of Ustad Fateh Ali Khan and the nephew of Ustad Mubarak Ali Khan. Fateh Ali Khan and Mubarak Ali Khan were celebrated qawwali singers in the sub-continent. Fateh Ali Khan was the leader of the qawwali party but they were billed as Fateh Ali Khan–Mubarak Ali Khan & Party. After the death of Fateh Ali Khan in 1964, Nusrat became the lead singer of the qawwali party alongside his uncle Mubarak Ali Khan. The party also included Mujahid Mubarak Ali Khan, who was the son of Mubarak Ali Khan and Nusrat's cousin. Following the death of Miubarak Ali Khan in 1971, the party was initially named Nusrat Fateh Ali Khan–Mujahid Mubarak Ali Khan & Party, emphasizing the importance of the second voice in the family group, just as before during their respective parents' time. As Nusrat's panache gained precedence and his prominence grew, the group became more closely associated with his name, eventually becoming recognised as Nusrat Fateh Ali Khan & Party.

One of Nusrat Fateh Ali Khan's earliest performances as leader of the qawwali group occurred on March 23, 1965, on Radio Pakistan as part of a studio recording for an annual music festival known as Jashn-e-Baharan. The performance drew praise from legends such as Ustad Bade Ghulam Ali Khan, Ustad Umid Ali Khan, Roshan Ara Begum, and Ustad Amanat Ali Khan.

The group evolved over time as new members joined and contributed to its musical works. Mujahid Mubarak continued with the group until the late 1980s, when he formed his own musical band (Mujahid Mubarak Ali Khan & Party). The group combined traditional qawwali elements with fusion, merging traditional qawwali with contemporary influences. Shortly after Nusrat's death in 1997, the group ceased performing.

== Musical style ==
Nusrat Fateh Ali Khan & Party primarily performed qawwali, a form of Sufi music from the Indian subcontinent. Their music was rooted in the traditions of Indian classical music, with emphasis on call-and-response vocals, tabla rhythms, and Indian harmonium melodies. Their performances followed the structure of traditional qawwali, focusing on devotional lyrics, often related to spiritual love and devotion. The group introduced the music with improvisation, a key element of qawwali, where both the vocalists and instrumentalists contributed to the nature of the performance.

While the group adhered to the core principles of qawwali, they also engaged in occasional collaborations with musicians from other genres, which introduced elements of Western music such as fusion. These collaborations, including contributions to film soundtracks, expanded their performance on the other side of traditional audiences but did not significantly alter the foundational aspects of traditional qawwali music.

The background lineup also included members who performed clapping, a traditional element in Qawwali music. The music, performed by the group, often began with subdued vocal exchanges between Nusrat and other vocalists, gradually building in intensity. Devotional compositions, such as "Allah Ho! Allah Ho", featured harmonies and improvisational vocal cascades, maintaining the principles of qawwali.

A 25-minutes long qawwali "Haq Ali Ali" begins with a slow introduction and featuring long passages with echoing vocals over minimal instrumentation. This was followed by the more intense "Shahbaaz Qalandar", dedicated to the 13th-century Sufi saint, and "Biba Sada Dil Mor De", where Nusrat repeatedly sang, "Give me my heart back".

== Performance ==
Nusrat Fateh Ali Khan was the group’s lead vocalist and composed music for its repertoire, creating original melodies. His repertoire consisted primarily of songs in Urdu and Punjabi, with some in Persian. He developed a distinctive approach to qawwali that incorporated elements of folk music and simplified classical forms. His innovations in qawwali and Punjabi folk song contributed to his popularity across South Asia.

Farrukh Fateh Ali Khan, Nusrat's brother, played a central role in the group with his abilities on the harmonium and as a supporting vocalist. He also sometimes assisted in the musical arrangements alongside Nusrat, drawing on the family's musical tradition.

Iqbal Naqibi, a former student of Nusrat, became another prominent lineup in the group. He joined the group as both a chorus member and manager. He played a central role in the group's international recognition, particularly during their tours to UK in the 1980s and 1990s. As the only fluent English speaker in the group, he acted as a mediator during international performances.

In the mid-1970s, Dildar Hussain, a tabla player from a family with a percussion tradition, became a member of the group. Initially joining on an occasional basis, he later became a permanent member. His music collaboration with Nusrat also established the musical identity of the group. Over the next two decades, Dildar remained a core lineup, serving as Nusrat's primary tabla player.

The group gained international recognition during the 1980s, performing at prominent venues such as the 1985 WOMAD festival and the Universal Amphitheatre in the 1990s. Their 1996 performance included traditional qawwali compositions, such as "Allah Hoo Allah Hoo" and "Mustt Mustt" of the same album title, presented with improvisational elements. Their work featured vocals, rhythmic tabla and harmonium patterns.

The performance included contributions from Rahat Fateh Ali Khan, Nusrat's nephew, who performed solos and duets. The ensemble's music reached audiences from various cultural backgrounds, including Western artists such as Rick Rubin, Eddie Vedder, Peter Gabriel and American rock band Pearl Jam among others. Nusrat's participation in Hollywood film soundtracks such as Dead Man Walking and Passion from The Last Temptation of Christ film and Bollywood's Bandit Queen introduced their work to broader audiences, while their music remained focused on traditional qawwali, incorporating fusion music.

== Members ==
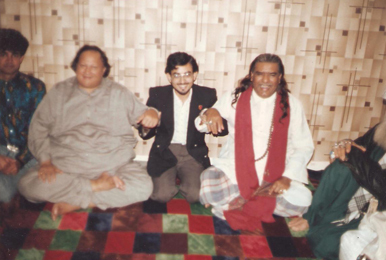
Nusrat Fateh Ali Khan (left) and Ghulam Farid Sabri (right)

The exact number of members in Nusrat Fateh Ali Khan & Party remains unclear, with Variety magazine mentions 11 members, and Discogs (a user-generated audio recording database) lists 13, and the Financial Times suggest 12 members, leaving the exact figure uncertain.

Core lineup

- Nusrat Fateh Ali Khan – lead vocals, harmonium player
- Farrukh Fateh Ali Khan – second, third vocalist, harmonium player
- Dildar Hussain – tabla player
- Rahat Fateh Ali Khan – background vocals
- Iqbal Naqibi – as the only fluent English speaker in the group, he acted as a mediator during International tours

Background vocals and instruments

- Asad Ali Khan
- Atta Fareed
- Kaukab Ali Khan
- Majawar Abbas
- Maqsood Hussain
- Mujahid Mubarik Ali Khan
- Rahmat Ali Khan
- Ghulam Fareed

== Reception ==
In a 1997 publication by JazzTimes, American musician Jeff Buckley describing them as, "these men do not play music. They are music itself".

== Discography ==
Nusrat Fateh Ali Khan & Party westernized the qawali and contributed to various Hollywood soundtracks as part of their performance outside Pakistan. In 1977/83, the group performed a live concert in the UK for Southall UK Concert 1983, Vol. 161 album. They performed for a song titled "Haq Ali Ali Ali Maula Ali Ali". The group also toured India in 1997 where they contributed to Vande Mataram album for a song titled "Gurus of Peace". The group also performed in Bandit Queen album which was released in 1995.

=== Albums ===
- Southall UK Concert 1983, Vol. 161 – "Haq Ali Ali Ali Maula Ali Ali" – (1983)
- The Supreme Collection, Vol. 1 – (1988)
- The Last Temptation of Christ – (1988)
- Pakistan: Qawwali: The Vocal Art of the Sufis II – (1987)
- Shahen-shah – (1989)
- Mustt Mustt – (1990)
- Shahbaaz – (1991)
- Dama Dam Mast Qalandar – (1991)
- The Last Prophet – (1994)
- Natural Born Killers – (1994)
- .Bandit Queen – (1995)
- Magic Touch – (1995)
- Revelation – (1995)
- Back to Qawwali – (1995)
- Dead Man Walking – (1996)
- Sangam – (1996)
- Intoxicated Spirit – (1996)
- Night Song – (1996)
- Novum Gaudium – (1997)
- Allah and the Prophet – (1998)
- The Final Studio Recordings – (2001)
- Sufi Qawwalis – (2002)
- Body and Soul – (2002)
- Chain of Light – (2024)

=== Songs ===
- "Haq Ali Ali Ali Maula Ali Ali" – (1983)
- Vande Mataram – "Gurus of Peace" – (1997)
- Dillagi film – song "Tanhai" (2000)

=== Live concerts ===
- Nusrat Fateh Ali Khan Live At Womad 1985 (1985)
- WOMAD, Yokohama – (1992)

== See also ==
- Fanna-Fi-Allah
- List of Pakistani qawwali singers
