= Tumhe Dillagi =

Song by Rahat Fateh Ali Khan

Song by Nusrat Fateh Ali Khan
- Language: Urdu: "تمہیں دل لگی"
- Genre: Ghazal, Qawwali
- Length: 16:17
- Label: Hi-Tech Music
- Composer: Nusrat Fateh Ali Khan
- Lyricist: Purnam Allahabadi
External audio
- "Tumhe Dillagi" on YouTube

"Tumhe Dillagi" is a ghazal song written by lyricist Purnam Allahabadi and composed by prominent Sufi singer of Pakistan Nusrat Fateh Ali Khan.

== 2013 remix ==
"Tumhe Dillagi"

Remix by Nusrat Fateh Ali Khan

from the album Reformed
- Released: 5 August 2013
- Genre: Ghazal, Qawwali
- Length: 4:21
- Label: Oriental Star Agencies, Hi-Tech Music
- Composers: Nusrat Fateh Ali Khan, A1melodymaster
- Lyricist: Purnam Allahabadi
- Producer: A1melodymaster
External audio
- "Tumhe Dillagi" on YouTube

It was recreated and released as a single on 5 August 2013 by A1melodymaster for the album Reformed; which released on 16 March 2017 with different renewed songs of Nusrat Fateh Ali Khan.

== 2016 versions ==
Nusrat Fateh Ali Khan's nephew, Rahat Fateh Ali Khan, has also recomposed and performed the song several times.

=== MTV Unplugged ===
"Tumhe Dillagi"

Single by Rahat Fateh Ali Khan

from the album MTV Unplugged S5E6
- Released: 6 February 2016
- Recorded: 2015
- Genre: Ghazal, Qawwali
- Length: 12:28
- Label: MTV Unplugged (India)
- Composer: Nusrat Fateh Ali Khan
- Lyricist: Purnam Allahabadi
External videos
- "Tumhe Dillagi" on YouTube

His live performance for MTV Unplugged (India) season 5 episode 6 was released in 2016.

=== ARY Digital ===
"Tumhe Dillagi"

Single by Rahat Fateh Ali Khan

from the album Dil Lagi
- Released: 5 March 2016
- Recorded: 2015
- Genre: Ghazal
- Length: 4:09
- Label: ARY Digital, Six Sigma Entertainment
- Composers: Nusrat Fateh Ali Khan, Sahir Ali Bagga
- Lyricist: Purnam Allahabadi
- Producer: Humayun Saeed
External videos
- "Tumhe Dillagi" on YouTube

ARY Digital also adopted his voice and released few days later for Nadeem Beyg's Pakistani drama serial Dil Lagi; starring Humayun Saeed and Mehwish Hayat. Music was composed by Sahir Ali Bagga.

=== T-Series ===
"Tumhe Dillagi"
- Music video starring Huma Qureshi and Vidyut Jammwal

Single by Rahat Fateh Ali Khan
- Released: 8 June 2016
- Recorded: 2016
- Genre: Ghazal, Sufi, Indian pop
- Length: 6:26 (Music video); 5:00 (Audio)
- Label: T-Series
- Composers: Nusrat Fateh Ali Khan, Salim–Sulaiman
- Lyricists: Purnam Allahabadi, Manoj Muntashir
- Producer: Bhushan Kumar
External media
Audio
- "Tumhe Dillagi" on YouTube
Video
- "Tumhe Dillagi" on YouTube
- "Tumhe Dillagi" on YouTube

The song was recreated by composer duo Salim–Sulaiman as a single music video. Producer Bhushan Kumar said, "Instead of just remixing the number, we have recreated the track with new lyrics" by Manoj Muntashir. The video, that has been directed by Kiran Deohans, stars actors Huma Qureshi and Vidyut Jammwal.

== See also ==
- Nusrat Fateh Ali Khan discography
- Rahat Fateh Ali Khan discography
