= Dust to Gold =

Dust to Gold may refer to:

- Dust to Gold (Nusrat Fateh Ali Khan album), a 1997/2000 qawwali album
- Dust to Gold (Bullet album), a 2018 metal album
