= Captive (soundtrack) =

Soundtrack album by The Edge
- Released: 1986
- Recorded: Dublin, Ireland 1986
- Genre: Soundtrack
- Length: 35:52
- Label: Virgin
- Producers: The Edge, Michael Brook

Professional ratings
Review scores
Source	Rating
AllMusic	3/5 stars

The soundtrack for the 1986 Anglo-French cinema film Captive is the only solo album by The Edge, guitarist of U2. It is also the only solo album by one of the members of U2.

The Edge approached Michael Brook, creator of the Infinite Guitar, which The Edge regularly uses, to collaborate on this soundtrack album; Brook co-produced and helped with the instrumentals and some of the writing.

The Edge also approached a young vocalist just beginning to appear on the Dublin scene to provide vocals for the main theme. This was Sinéad O'Connor, who would the following year release her debut album. She and The Edge's U2 bandmate Larry Mullen Jr. contributed to "Heroine", with O'Connor providing lead vocals and Mullen providing drums.

The music on Captive is a mix of ambient styles. The majority of tracks, except tracks 2 and 4, are instrumentals. The track "Heroine" was released as a single.

== Track listing ==
All tracks written by The Edge except where noted.

1. "Rowena's Theme" – 3:56
2. "Heroine" (Theme from Captive) (music by The Edge, lyrics by The Edge and Sinéad O'Connor) – 4:27
3. "One Foot in Heaven" – 5:10
4. "The Strange Party" – 5:35
5. "Hiro's Theme I" – 4:16
6. "Drift" – 2:20
7. "The Dream Theme" – 3:36
8. "Djinn" (Michael Brook) – 3:02
9. "Island" – 1:53
10. "Hiro's Theme (Reprise)" – 1:37

== Personnel ==
The Edge and Michael Brook – all instruments except:

- Lesley Bishop – French horn on "Rowena's Theme"
- Larry Mullen Jr – drums on "Heroine"
- Sinéad O'Connor – vocals on "Heroine"
- Steve Lillywhite – remix of "Heroine"
