= Night Song (Nusrat Fateh Ali Khan album) =

Studio album by Nusrat Fateh Ali Khan and Michael Brook
- Released: 20 February 1996
- Recorded: 1995
- Studios: Real World, Wiltshire
- Genres: Qawwali; ambient; world fusion
- Length: 48:01
- Label: Real World
- Producer: Michael Brook

Nusrat Fateh Ali Khan and Michael Brook chronology
| The Last Prophet (1994) | Night Song (1996) | Intoxicated Spirit (1996) |

Night Song is a collaborative studio album by Pakistani qawwali singer Nusrat Fateh Ali Khan and Canadian ambient musician, guitarist and producer Michael Brook. Recorded in 1995 and released in 1996 on Real World Records, it was Khan's last album released on the label during his lifetime. Khan and Brook had previously collaborated for Mustt Mustt (1990), a critically acclaimed world fusion album said to have led Pakistani youth to discover Sufi religious music. The two had not worked for some time but collaborated again for a new album in 1995, naming the album Night Song. The album was produced by Brook, who developed an innovative but difficult production process for the album. Khan recorded improvisations for the album, and Brook had to decide which sections, some of which were an hour long, were the best and how they were going to fit together, without having a structural point of reference to start with or aim towards. He had components recorded on multi-track tapes, and created each track part by part, overdubbing his instrumentation atop of it, a manual process that predated easy forms of digital editing.

The album is considered a world fusion album, combining Khan's qawwali vocals with Brook's ambient production, and is often considered to be one of Khan's most experimental albums, featuring contributions from Senegalese and classically trained musicians. The songs on the album were written collaboratively between the duo. The album contains down-to-earth lyrics about relationships and spiritual cleanliness, although Consumable Online noted that, despite this, “the two artists make an obvious, pronounced effort to lead one down a path of pure spiritual ecstasy.” Upon its February 1996 release, it charted at number 4 on the Billboard Top World Music Albums chart and number 65 on the UK Album Chart, and was critically acclaimed, with one review declaring it “a most intoxicating spiritually uplifting cross-cultural expression,” and another calling it "elegant and entrancing." The album was nominated for a Grammy Award for Best World Music Album in 1997, but lost out to the Chieftains' album Santiago. Several months earlier, Mojo had named it the 21st best album of 1996 in their year-end "Albums of the Year" list. Songs from this album and Mustt Mustt were remixed for the pair's dubtronica-orientated remix album Star Rise, released in 1997.

== Background ==
In 1989, English rock and world musician Peter Gabriel suggested to qawwali star Nusrat Fateh Ali Khan and ambient musician and guitarist Michael Brook that they record a collaborative album together for Gabriel's recently established world music label Real World Records. The duo subsequently recorded Mustt Mustt (1990), a world fusion album credited only to Khan that features Khan's qawwali vocals with keyboard work from Brook. Considered a "secularized" or "Western" version of Khan's other Qawwali albums, it was critically acclaimed internationally and has been credited with leading Pakistani youth to discover Sufi religious music, qawwali. It was subsequently named one of the Top 100 albums of the 1990s by American music magazine Alternative Press, and reached number 14 on the Billboard Top World Music Albums chart in 1991. David Lynch of The Austin Chronicle called the album a "seminal fusion". British musician Nitin Sawhney said that it "changed the face of British music forever".

The album was originally intended to be a one-off collaboration, and the pair subsequently worked on separate projects. Khan released a string of over ten more traditional solo albums, including The Day, the Night, the Dawn, the Dusk (1991), the unanimously acclaimed Devotional Songs (1992) and The Last Prophet (1994), the latter two albums also released on Real World Records. Brook, meanwhile, released the acclaimed Cobalt Blue (1992) on 4AD Records, and toured with Robert Fripp in 1993, resulting in the release of the tour's live album Damage: Live in 1994 on Virgin Records. However, Khan and Brook chose to reunite in 1994 for another album for Real World Records. Naming the album Night Song, work began in 1994. Part of the album was reportedly recorded in Real World's Real World Studios in Box, Wiltshire.

== Recording ==
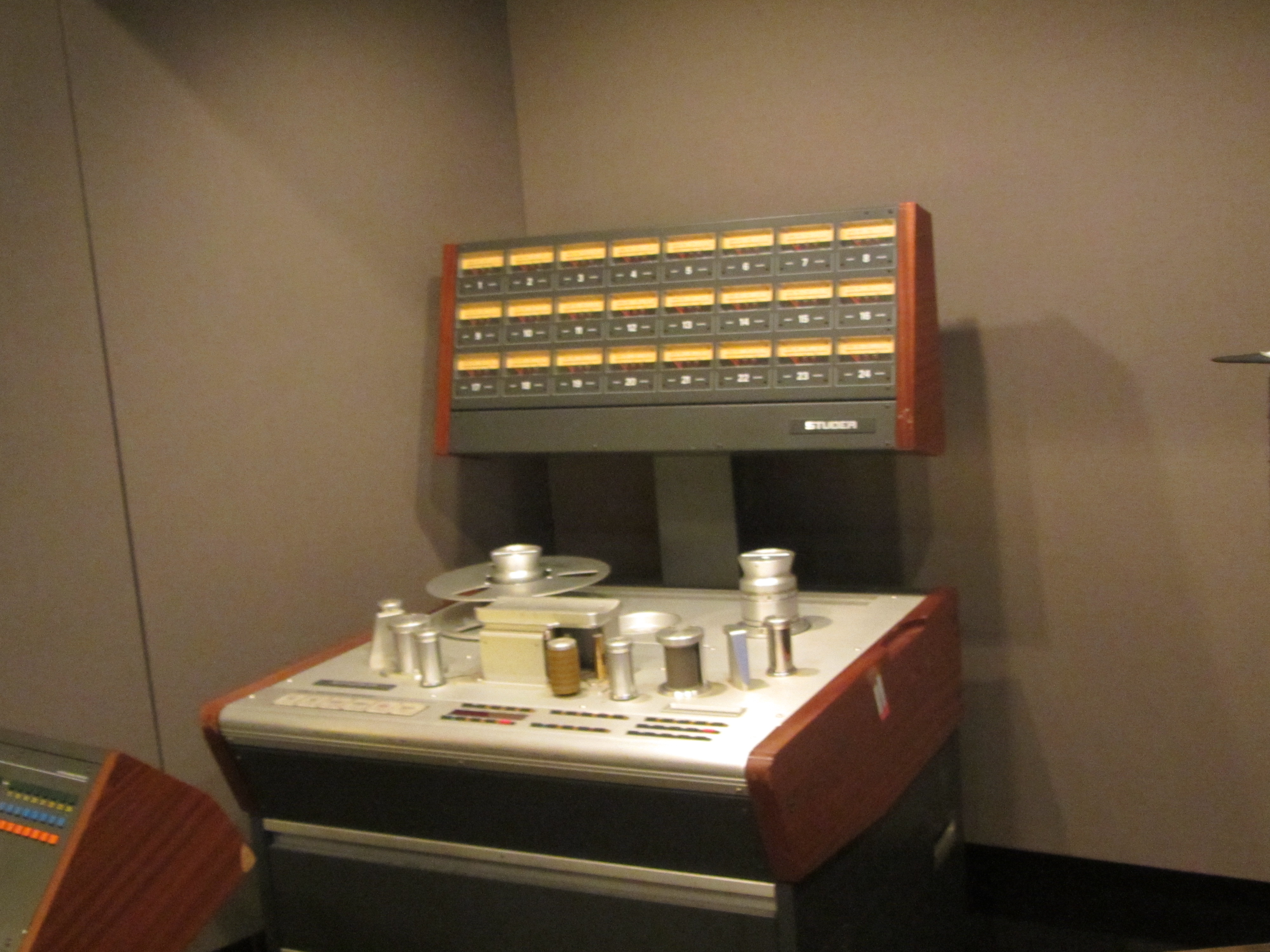
Brook made much use of a 24-track analogue multitrack recorder during the production.

The album was produced by Brook, who chose to work in a new method, after discovering that, during the recording of Mustt Mustt, Khan soars to his greatest heights when he has ample time to improvise, which frustrated Brook because the backing tracks he had created were "on the short side." He worked in a method which saw Khan record vocal improvisations onto multitrack tapes which Brook would subsequently add to and layer, part by part, in the style of remixing; unlike the typical method of remixers building their mixes out of recorded parts that had already been carefully selected and edited by the original artist, for Night Song, Brook had to decide which sections out of Khan's improvisations, some of which were an hour long, were the best and how they were going to fit together, without having a structural point of reference to start with or aim towards. Sound on Sound acknowledged that it involved "a gigantic editing challenge, and the risk of not seeing the wood for the trees anymore."

It was not possible to have Khan and the Western musicians in the room at the same time due to logistical reasons, so Brook improvised bedtracks with guitarist Robert Ahwai, percussionist James Pinker and Brook himself on infinite guitar, bass, keyboards and drum programming. He selected what he considered to be the best parts of these 24-track analogue recordings, and sampled and looped them on a Roland S770, triggered from his Atari/Notator sequencing system. These loops were then mixed to two tracks of another 24-track reel. A 24-track reel has a running time of 28 minutes, which meant that Brook had 21 tracks, with one having been sacrificed to SMPTE code, and each 28 minutes long, available for overdubs. Khan improvised three or four takes to each of the nine tracks, resulting in many hours of unedited material.

Brook encountered another problem; whilst the two-track mixdown of looped backing track sounded too "loopy", the original bedtracks of Brook, Ahwai and Pinker sounded too rough and inconsistent to really work well with the vocals. Transferring sections of the vocals to the bedtrack 24-track did not work for that reason, so Brook decided to sample sections of the original bedtracks and transfer them to the 24-track vocal reel, and then overdub other instruments onto that. However, this was a problem because Brook had no idea what structure he was working towards. Brook said that "the best bits of the vocals were spread out all over the tape, and it was very hard to hear things in context or in proper sequence." What they then did was transfer sections of what they called the original master to the vocal master, and then do a mock-up, synchronised mix to DAT of the different sections that they liked, stopping the DAT every time they moved to the next section. They would then listen to the DAT mix to see if things worked in sequence. Brook noted that "it was a very slow process, because you could never let the multitrack tape run and say: “oh, this sounds good”, or “that transition doesn’t sound right.”

“If we’d had a 24-track Fairlight it would have been alright, but there was no budget for that. Even using a few ADATs, where you can slip and slide tracks, and bounce between them, would have been much better. Having a single 24-track most of the time was very frustrating. Working with this montage-type approach meant that everything took forever.”

— Michael Brook reflecting on the production.

However, because Brook had to "do everything" with the S770 sampler, and did not have a hard disk editor available, it was a "made even slower." In order to hear whether something worked or not, he had had to load it into the S770 sampler, copy it onto tape, "maybe do this for five or six tracks more" and then create the rough DAT mix to listen to the result. As a result, it would take them half a day to be able to listen to something, whereas the same edit would have taken two minutes in a 24-track Fairlight. Brook noted, commenting on the overall sessions, that he "cannot imagine a more laborious way of making a record." Sound on Sound considered the sessions a "technological nightmare". However, on one occasion during recording, after a particularly long period of "laborious editing, sampling, and shifting things around in MIDI sequences", several musicians from Baba Maal’s band arrived at the studio to record some overdubs for them. Brook said that "it was amazing how that instantly lifted our spirits. When you get so bogged down in the details, you quickly lose the mood."

== Music and lyrics ==
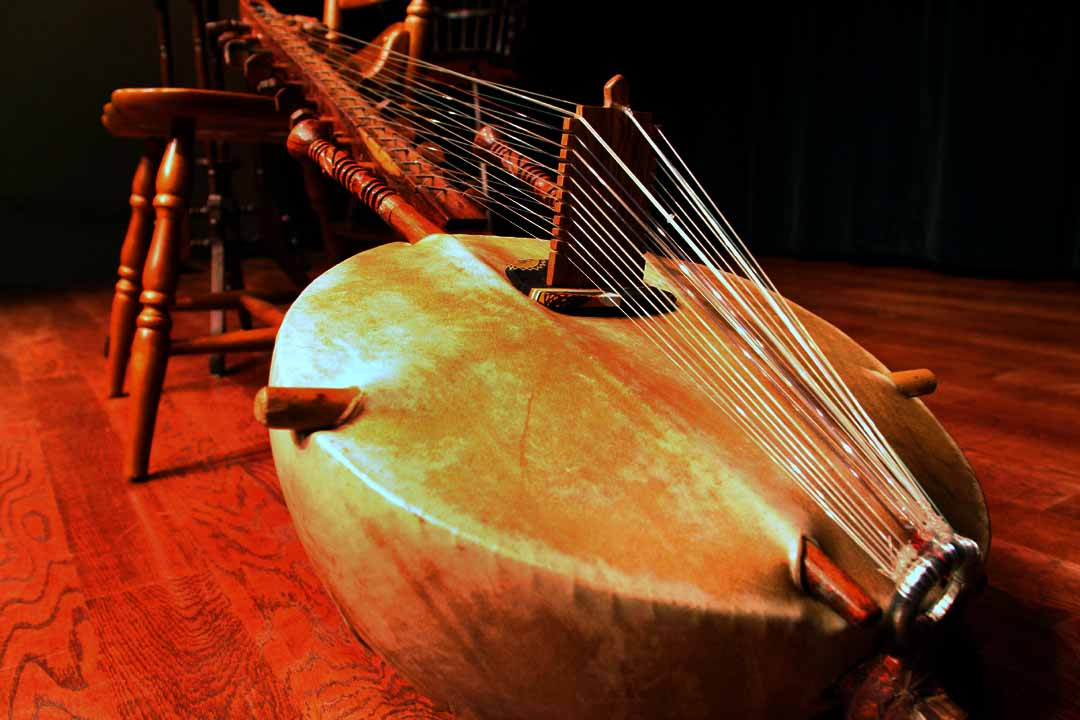
The opening song "My Heart, My Life" features a kora.

Night Song is considered a world fusion album that combines Nusrat's Qawwali vocals with Brook’s electronic ambient music. It is sometimes considered Khan's most experimental album, partly due to featuring Senegalese and classically trained musicians. Billboard said the album “disregarded genre”. The New York Times considered it "special, moody music", whilst Time Out considered it an ambient album. Banning Eyre of Allmusic said that the album “helped establish something of a tradition for Real World crossover projects. The genre features dreamy, atmospheric keyboards and guitars, simple, mid-tempo rhythms, and a kind of low-key understatement.” Consumable Online said that "the mood of Night Song swings rapidly from track to track." They also drew "certain parallels" between the album and many of ambient pioneer Brian Eno’s works and productions, noting that Brook has done extensive work with Eno in the past. They also noted that parallels could be drawn with the music of Brook's 4AD labelmates Lisa Gerrard and Dead Can Dance, who they noted also sometimes "fuse traditional foreign (or pseudo-foreign) vocals and rhythm with modern ambient music and, on occasion, technological sound," saying that this makes traditional music somewhat more accessible to the listener while adding diversity to the elements of ambient.

Unlike Mustt Mustt, whose songs were the product of the pair's separated efforts, the songs on Night Song were written collaboratively. The album contains down-to-earth lyrics about relationships and spiritual cleanliness, although Consumable Online noted that, despite this, "the two artists make an obvious, pronounced effort to lead one down a path of pure spiritual ecstasy." The opening song "My Heart, My Life" features West African kora and electronic backing, with Nusrat singing in a relaxed mid-range voice. The song was compared to a Salif Keita ballad as it works up to its "energized" closing chant. Eyre said that "My Comfort Remains" and "Crest" are "essentially pop numbers with catchy melodies, the former bouncy but static, the latter building towards a revelatory crescendo." The fifth track, "Longing", features Nusrat's signature scat singing and his singular wail, "unmistakable even when lavished with effects." Consumable Online said that the song is "a slow ballad beginning with a slide guitar's sweet melody and ending with strangled pleas (In English, "my dear longing for you is killing me.")" "Sweet Pain" begins "deep in dream space with a wandering bassline and a simple backbeat, and then heating up to powerful close with Nusrat delivering spitfire scat." "Lament" is "plodding, desolate and dark," with Nusrat droning "without you there is gloominess–come back home sweetheart" as mellow background guitar sounds "soar." "Intoxicated" is a more upbeat than "Lament", and features "unexpected outbursts of Nusrat's rapid-fire, metaphorical vocals about obsession."

== Release and reception ==
Professional ratings
Review scores
| Source | Rating |
|---|---|
| AllMusic | 4.5/5 stars |
| The Observer | (favourable) |
| Q | (favourable) |
| Rolling Stone | 4/5 stars |

The album was released on 20 February 1996 by Peter Gabriel’s world music label Real World Records. Considered a commercial success for a world album, it reached number 4 on the United States Billboard Top World Music Albums chart and number 65 in the UK Albums Chart, where it charted for one week. The album was acclaimed by critics. Banning Eyre of AllMusic stated that “wherever you stand on Real World's arty aesthetics, you have to admire the Qawwali star's sense of adventure here.” Consumable Online said that “Night Song makes a great companion to either sudden revelation or a simple evening in the forest, under the stars,” commenting that "it is certainly one of the best collaborative albums of the year." The Guardian said it was “a quite sensational slow-burner of an album...Nusrat’s incredible vocal control and gift for wending his way round an evocative melody is bolstered by Brook’s sensitive ambient, gently beat-based arrangements. No-one deserves the extra exposure more than this peerless singer.” Time Out called it "the best world music album...ever!"

Billboard called it “an album for the ages, solidifying Khan’s stature as one of the world’s pre-eminent singers.” Time Out said “the world’s best singer has a gag put in his mouth and delivers an ambient album that couldn’t be smoother if it was silk.” The Daily Telegraph said that "this collaboration with Michael Brook and his guitars provides the most natural complement to Nusrat's harmonium-tabla drums formula, yet never overshadows the mystical power of his voice," whilst Folk Roots said that "this is a truly great record. Michael Brook is an unmistakably original producer who knows how to put a great vocal instrument into a stunning new context. This is a truly great record," and The Los Angeles View said that "this collaboration demonstrates a distinct stroke of genius, a most intoxicating spiritually uplifting cross-cultural expression." Keyboard Connections called it “a unique combination of intricate East-meets-West. Guitar, sampled drumbeats, and rhythmic vocals the like of which you’ve never heard before. Night Song presents an incomparable voice in a challenging setting.” Bhasker Gupta of All About Jazz retrospectively said, along with Mustt Mustt, "these are two very important albums — insistent yet melancholic, sacrilegious for purists, innovative for radicals — with Khan at his adventurous best."

The album was nominated for the Grammy Award for Best World Music Album at the 39th Annual Grammy Awards in 1997, but lost out to the Chieftains' album Santiago. In December 1996, Billboard ranked it at number 15 in their list of the "Top World Music Albums" of 1996. Mojo ranked it at number 21 in their list of the top 40 albums of 1996. Eyre also noted that the album was also influential on Real World Records, helping "establish something of a tradition" for the label's crossover projects, due to the "dreamy, atmospheric keyboards and guitars, simple, mid-tempo rhythms, and a kind of low-key understatement" to the album. In 1997, Real World Records released a remix album of the duo's work, Star Rise, which featured five tracks from Night Song and four tracks from Mustt Mustt remixed by several prominent dubtronica musicians. The remix of "Sweet Pain" from the album was released as a twelve-inch single by Virgin Records in 1997 to promote the album. Real World Records re-released Night Song with slightly modified artwork on 4 May 2015 as part of their "Real World Gold" series, a series which "peels back the years to revisit and re-evaluate some most inspirational and beautiful music from the archives" of Real World Records." The label said that, "as the name suggests, it's a programme of reissues that brings some of the key Real World releases back into the sunlight as many titles have been unavailable for a number of years."

== Track listing ==
All tracks are written by Nusrat Fateh Ali Khan and Michael Brook.

Night Song
| No. | Title | Length |
|---|---|---|
| 1. | "My Heart, My Life" | 5:30 |
| 2. | "Intoxicated" | 7:34 |
| 3. | "Lament" | 5:14 |
| 4. | "My Comfort Remains" | 6:39 |
| 5. | "Longing" | 5:35 |
| 6. | "Sweet Pain" | 6:28 |
| 7. | "Night Song" | 4:47 |
| 8. | "Crest" | 6:14 |
| Total length: | | 48:01 |

== Personnel ==
- Nusrat Fateh Ali Khan - vocals, harmonium (3), keyboards (7)
- Michael Brook - infinite guitar (1-6, 8), string arrangement (2), keyboards (4), electronic percussion (2, 4), bass drone (7), buzz bass (8)
- Caroline Dale - cello (6)
- Dildar Hussain - tabla (2, 5)
- Farrukh Fateh Ali Khan - harmonium (2, 5)
- James Pinker - drums (1, 3, 5, 6), percussion (1), hi-hat (8)
- Jo Bruce - Hammond Organ (2), woodwinds (8), drums (8)
- Kauwding Cissokho - kora (1, 4)
- Massamba Diop - talking drum (1)
- Mick Karn - bass (2)
- Richard Evans - mandola (2), acid wah treatment (3, 8)
- Robert Ahwai - bass (1, 4-6)

== Charts ==
| Chart (1996) | Peak position |
|---|---|
| UK Albums Chart | 65 |
| US Billboard Top World Music Albums chart. | 4 |
