= Albino Alligator =

- Theatrical release poster
- Directed by: Kevin Spacey
- Written by: Christian Forte
- Produced by: Bradley Jenkel; Brad Krevoy; Steven Stabler
- Starring: Matt Dillon; Faye Dunaway; Gary Sinise; William Fichtner; Viggo Mortensen; John Spencer; Skeet Ulrich; M. Emmet Walsh; Joe Mantegna
- Cinematography: Mark Plummer
- Edited by: Jay Cassidy
- Music by: Michael Brook
- Production company: Motion Picture Corporation of America
- Distributed by: Miramax Films
- Release dates: September 9, 1996 (TIFF); January 17, 1997 (United States)
- Running time: 97 minutes
- Country: United States
- Language: English
- Budget: $5 million
- Box office: $339,379

Albino Alligator is a 1996 American crime thriller film. The directorial debut of Kevin Spacey as well as the screenwriting debut of Christian Forte, it stars Matt Dillon, Faye Dunaway, and Gary Sinise.

It tells the story of three small-time criminals who take hostages after being cornered by the police. The title refers to an anecdote told in the film, claiming that alligators will use an albino among them as sacrifice, so that the opposing alligators will be distracted and become prey themselves.

== Plot ==
Brothers Dova (Matt Dillon) and Milo (Gary Sinise) are small-time crooks. They and their partner, Law (William Fichtner), pull a holdup in New Orleans that goes terribly wrong. A police officer is killed, as are two other men. The robbers flee to a local bar, Dino's Last Chance, desperately taking everyone inside hostage.

Milo is seriously wounded and bleeding. Law is a sociopath who is ready and willing to kill anyone who gets in his way. Dova is their leader, trying to keep the situation calm while federal agents, led by Browning (Joe Mantegna), surround the bar. A bar employee, Janet (Faye Dunaway), tries but fails to reason with the intruders. Her boss, Dino, behind the bar, secretly has a shotgun that he is hoping to get a chance to use. He does—grabbing Law and holding it on him, but Law gets the upper hand and bludgeons him. Besides a barfly (John Spencer) who is barely coherent and a younger man, Danny (Skeet Ulrich) shooting pool, there is one other customer (Viggo Mortensen), a man named Foucard dressed in a business suit, who is strangely silent and inactive all his time there. As the life of Milo slips away and the robbers' demands to the cops go unmet, Dova decides whether to surrender or start letting Law shoot hostages one at a time. Law is especially terrified of going back to prison. Dova and Law prepare to take Danny as a hostage. But Janet pleads with them not to as he is her son. It is revealed that Foucard is a wanted fugitive and the police really want him. Dova and Law prepare to give Foucard to the police and pretend that Foucard is the kidnapper and they are the hostages.

Milo has Dova and Law swear on their mothers that they will not kill anyone. But when painted into a corner, Law is more than ready to kill and Dova agrees. Milo wants no more of it all and prepares to turn himself in. Dova holds a gun on him to keep him there. When Dova and Law leave, Milo takes the knife he was given from a hostage and uses it to cut his wrists, committing suicide. Dova finds out and is in tears. They prepare to give the police the wanted Foucard. The police finally storm the place and open fire, killing both Law and Foucard. Dova and the real hostages are allowed to vacate the bar. Janet covers for Dova, as he kept Law from killing the rest of the hostages. Dova walks on in a state of shock.

== Cast ==
- Matt Dillon as Dova
- Faye Dunaway as Janet Boudreaux
- Gary Sinise as Milo
- William Fichtner as Law
- Viggo Mortensen as Guy Foucard
- John Spencer as Jack
- Skeet Ulrich as Danny Boudreaux
- Frankie Faison as ATF Agent Marv Rose
- Melinda McGraw as Jenny Ferguson
- Joe Mantegna as A.T.F. Agent G.D. Browning
- M. Emmet Walsh as Dino
- Jeffrey M. Hoffman as Jenny's Cameraman

== Production ==
In May 1995, it was reported that Kevin Spacey would direct Albino Alligator. By December of that year, Miramax acquired distribution rights to the film for $5 million. As Bryan Singer had been instrumental in getting him cast in The Usual Suspects despite the producers' hesitance at his casting due to being an unknown, Spacey routinely conferred with Singer for advice throughout the production.

== Release and reception ==
Albino Alligator premiered at the Toronto International Film Festival in September 1996, before receiving a U.S. theatrical release on January 17, 1997. In early 1997, the film grossed only $339,379 against a $6 million budget.

=== Critical response ===
Reviews for the film were generally mixed. On the review aggregator website Rotten Tomatoes, 50% of 20 critics' reviews are positive. The website's consensus reads: "Matt Dillon's intense performance is the best aspect of Albino Alligator, a mannered thriller that pantomimes the tropes of film noir to phony effect." Metacritic, which uses a weighted average, assigned the film a score of 48 out of 100, based on 17 critics, indicating "mixed or average" reviews.

Faye Dunaway was nominated for a Golden Raspberry Award as Worst Supporting Actress.

=== Home media ===
Miramax Home Entertainment released the film on VHS in 1997, and on LaserDisc on October 1, 1997. It was later released on DVD in widescreen, under their "Miramax Classics" label.

In 2010, Miramax was sold by Disney (their owners since 1993), with the studio being taken over by private equity firm Filmyard Holdings that same year. Filmyard sublicensed the home video rights for several Miramax titles to Echo Bridge Entertainment, who re-released Albino Alligator on a triple feature DVD on June 8, 2011. This release was titled "Miramax Triple Feature Crime", and also included the Miramax films The Grifters and The Yards. On July 12, 2012, Echo Bridge released Albino Alligator on Blu-ray.

Filmyard sold Miramax to Qatari company beIN Media Group during March 2016. In April 2020, ViacomCBS (now known as Paramount Skydance) acquired the rights to Miramax's library, after buying a 49% stake in the studio from beIN. On March 4, 2021, Albino Alligator was made available on their new streaming service Paramount+, as one of its inaugural launch titles. Paramount Home Entertainment also reissued the film on Blu-ray later that year, along with many other Miramax titles. This 2021 release removed Kevin Spacey's name from the front cover, following his 2017 sexual abuse allegations.

== Soundtrack ==
Albino Alligator

Soundtrack album by Michael Brook
- Released: 11 February 1997
- Recorded: Hybrid Studios; Music Annex Studios; John Keane Recording Studio
- Genres: Film score, ambient, jazz
- Length: 48:06
- Label: 4AD
- Producer: Michael Brook

Michael Brook chronology
Night Song (1996)	Albino Alligator (1997)	The Seven Steps to Mercy (1997)

Professional ratings
Review scores
Source	Rating
AllMusic	4/5 stars
Uncut	3/5 stars

Ambient guitarist and record producer Michael Brook produced the score for Albino Alligator. The soundtrack was released by 4AD on CD in the United States on February 11, 1997, and CD and vinyl LP in the United Kingdom on February 24, 1997. The score includes a cover of "Ill Wind" featuring bass by Red Hot Chili Peppers bassist Flea and guest vocals from R.E.M.'s Michael Stipe and jazz singer Jimmy Scott. Flea and Red Hot Chili Peppers vocalist Anthony Kiedis both went on to attend a premiere event for the film in Los Angeles during January 1997.

=== Track listing ===
All tracks are written by Michael Brook, except where noted.

No.	Title	Writer(s)	Length
1.	"Arrival"		5:01
2.	"Doggie Dog"		1:52
3.	"Slow Town"		2:34
4.	"Preparation"		3:18
5.	"Miscalculator"		1:44
6.	"Aftermath"		4:39
7.	"Tunnel"		5:00
8.	"Albo Gator"		4:18
9.	"The Promise"		4:36
10.	"The City"		5:46
11.	"The Kicker"		1:48
12.	"Exit"		4:16
13.	"Ill Wind (You're Blowing Me No Good)" (featuring Michael Stipe, Jimmy Scott, and Flea)	Harold Arlen, Ted Koehler	3:34
