= Purnam Allahabadi =

Urdu language poet

- Born: 1940; Allahabad, India, British India
- Died: 9 June 2009 (aged 68–69); Lahore, Pakistan
- Occupations: Lyricist, poet
- Known for: Qawwali, Na'at

Purnam Allahabadi (born Mohammed Musa Hashmi; 1940 – 29 June 2009) was a Pakistani Urdu poet and lyricist. He is best known for writing the popular qawwali "Bhar Do Jholi Meri Ya Muhammad", performed by the Sabri Brothers, and the ghazal "Tumhe Dillagi Bhool Jani Padegi", originally performed by Nusrat Fateh Ali Khan.

== Early life and career ==
Purnam Allahabadi was born in Allahabad, then part of British India. Following the partition of India in 1947 and the creation of Pakistan, he migrated with his family to Karachi, Pakistan, where he spent his early years. He later moved to Lahore due to family circumstances and lived in modest conditions in a single-room flat in the Anarkali Bazaar area.

Despite leading a largely reclusive life, Allahabadi became known for his Urdu poetry, particularly naats, hamds, and qawwalis. His notable works include the qawwali's "Bhar Do Jholi Meri Ya Muhammad" and "O Sharabi Chhod De Peena", both composed and sung by the Sabri Brothers. Allahabadi also wrote the qawwali "Mast Nazron Se Allah Bachaye" and the ghazal "Tumhe Dillagi Bhool Jani Padegi", both of which were originally composed and sung by Nusrat Fateh Ali Khan.
