= Cobalt Blue (album) =

Studio album by Michael Brook
- Released: 1992
- Label: 4AD
- Producer: Michael Brook

Michael Brook chronology
Hybrid (1985)	Cobalt Blue (1992)	Live at the Aquarium (1993)

Cobalt Blue is an album by the Canadian musician Michael Brook, released in 1992. Brook supported the album with a North American tour, playing some shows with John Cale. The album was reissued in 1999, with an additional disc of live material.

== Production ==
The album was produced by Brook. Brian Eno and Daniel Lanois contributed to the album; Eno cowrote one song. Eno also helped Brook to rearrange some of the material after it had been recorded. "Skip Wave" was influenced by Indian sitar music. Brook employed his infinite guitar, which prolongs notes. He played a Tōkai Gakki guitar with a scalloped neck.

== Critical reception ==
Professional ratings
Review scores
Source	Rating
AllMusic	4.5/5 stars
The Buffalo News	4/5 stars
DownBeat	4/5 stars
The Encyclopedia of Popular Music	4/5 stars
MusicHound World: The Essential Album Guide	4/5 stars
Windsor Star	B+

Trouser Press called the album "a grown-up alternative to Mike Oldfield's Tubular Bells or an intelligent reappraisal of new age music (if such a thing is possible), this evocative dreamscape evaporates if observed closely, yet makes fine background music." The Windsor Star stated that "the frustration grows as you realize each 'tune' is made of layers of synthesized textures that seem to lead nowhere."

The Waterloo Region Record determined that "its unrelenting moodiness begins to wear thin by about track three, the hypnotic 'Red Shift', and by the ninth or 10th number the whole thing has become a kind of John Cage meets muzak." The Dallas Morning News deemed Cobalt Blue "eerie, atmospheric and beautiful." The Buffalo News likened it to "mood music for U2 fans."

AllMusic wrote that the album "possesses a depth and complexity which standard ambient recordings lack."

== Track listing ==
No.	Title	Length
1.	"Shona Bridge"	4:37
2.	"Breakdown"	4:11
3.	"Red Shift"	4:52
4.	"Skip Wave"	3:34
5.	"Slipstream"	2:06
6.	"Andean"	3:36
7.	"Slow Breakdown"	2:35
8.	"Ultramarine"	4:35
9.	"Urbana"	4:06
10.	"Lakbossa"	3:40
11.	"Ten"	3:50
12.	"Hawaii"	4:10
