= Man Atkeya Beparwah De Naal =

Qawwali performed by Nusrat Fateh Ali Khan

Song by Nusrat Fateh Ali Khan
- Language: Punjabi
- Released: 1992
- Genre: Qawwali
- Composer: Nusrat Fateh Ali Khan
- Lyricist: Shah Hussain

"Man Atkeya Beparwah De Naal" (Punjabi: من اٹکیا بے پرواہ دے نال; lit "My soul is entangled with the indifferent one”) is a Punjabi qawwali that was originally composed and performed by Ustad Nusrat Fateh Ali Khan. The lyrics were written by the 16th-century Punjabi Sufi poet and mystic Shah Hussain (1538–1599), who lived during the early Mughal era. Although Nusrat had performed live renditions of Man Atkeya Beparwah De Naal from the late 1980s onward, the official recording was released in 1992 on the album Prem Deewani, Vol. 52. Over the years, numerous artists have covered the song, including Javed Bashir and Akbar Ali for Coke Studio Pakistan Season 10, Wahdat Rameez, and Zeeshan Ali. In 2026, composer Shashwat Sachdev reimagined Nusrat's version for Aditya Dhar's Hindi film Dhurandhar: The Revenge, incorporating it into the soundtrack under the title "Destiny – Mann Atkeya", performed by Vaibhav Gupta, Shahzad Ali and Token.

== Description ==
The lyrics of Man Atkeya Beparwah De Naal express the poet's complete surrender and entanglement with the Divine Beloved, portrayed as beparwah (indifferent or carefree), a classic Islamic Sufi motif for Allah (God), who remains transcendent and self-sufficient yet irresistibly draws the lover's soul. This state of ecstatic devotion is captured in lines such as “Wasdi Hardam Mann Mere Vich, Soorat Yaar Pyare Di” (“The image of the precious beloved lives constantly within my soul”), illustrating how the divine presence permeates the lover's being, transcending worldly concerns and rendering other attachments meaningless. The Beloved is further understood, within the broader Sufi framework of the poem, as the sovereign of both worlds, this life and the hereafter, reinforcing the totalizing nature of divine love and devotion.

Shah Hussain embraces the role of a humble fakir (Muslim ascetic), expressing the desire for annihilation in the beloved "Kahe Hussain Fakir Numanha, Theewan Khaak Daware Di" ("Says Hussain the worthless fakir: May I become the dust at Your threshold"). This expression resonates with the Sufi concept of fana, the annihilation of the ego in the Divine. The lyrics also acknowledge the limits of formal guidance in the lines “Qazi Mullah Matti Dende, Kharay Sayane Rah Dasende, Ishq Kee Lagay Rah De Naal” (“Judges and clerics give advice; the righteous and wise elders show the way, but love has no fixed path”), emphasizing that while religious scholarship and worldly wisdom have their place, the path of all-consuming spiritual love for the divine transcends formal structures and unfolds through inner experience and grace. This resonates with the Qurʾānic emphasis on purity of intention and the well-known Prophetic saying that actions are judged by intentions, highlighting the primacy of inner sincerity over outward form. Al-Ghazali likewise argues that external acts of worship are meaningful only when animated by inner awareness and intention. The pain of separation from the Divine is poignantly expressed in “Sajan Bin Raatan Hoian Waddiyan” (“Without my beloved, the nights have become endlessly long”), evoking the restless longing that defines the lover's life. This sense of absence is central to Sufi spirituality, where separation (firaq) fuels the desire for union (wisal). Longing (shawq) is presented in classical Sufi thought as a defining feature of the mystical path, in which the pain of separation intensifies awareness of the Divine, a theme elaborated extensively by Ibn Arabi, who describes yearning as both the result of divine attraction and the means by which the lover is drawn toward union. In Nusrat Fateh Ali Khan’s rendition of Man Atkeya Beparwah De Naal, the intertwined themes of longing (shawq), annihilation (fana), and divine attraction are not merely articulated but experientially enacted, transforming the poetic text into a deeply moving prayer of mystical absorption and selfless love.
