= Nit Khair Manga Sohneya Main Teri =

Qawwali performed by Nusrat Fateh Ali Khan

Song by Nusrat Fateh Ali Khan
- Language: Punjabi
- Released: 1981
- Genre: Qawwali
- Composer: Nusrat Fateh Ali Khan
- Lyricists: Badar Ali Ansari; Nusrat Fateh Ali Khan

"Nit Khair Manga Sohneya Main Teri" (Punjabi: نت خیر منگاں سوہنیا میں تیری transl. "I ask for your well-being my beloved") is a Punjabi qawwali that was originally composed and performed by Ustad Nusrat Fateh Ali Khan. The lyrics to Nit Khair Manga are primarily penned by the Punjabi poet Badar Ali Ansari, with additional lyrics written by Nusrat. Nusrat had performed live renditions of Nit Khair Manga from the late 1970s onward and released an official recording in 1981. The qawwali gained global prominence in the late 1980s through his powerful live performances, notably on his 1988 UK tour, which were recorded by Oriental Star Agencies Ltd. Nit Khair Manga has been covered and recreated by many prominent artists including Hans Raj Hans and Rahat Fateh Ali Khan.

The lyrics consist of a heartfelt prayer in which the lover asks absolutely nothing for himself, not wealth, not health, not even union with the beloved. Instead, every line is a plea to God for the beloved’s happiness, safety, long life, and freedom from all pain and sorrow. The repeated chorus “Every day and every night, my beloved, I pray only for your well-being; I ask for no other prayer” sets the tone of complete selflessness. The lover declares that without the beloved, his own life has no meaning or purpose. He wishes the beloved thousands of joys in every moment, protection from even the slightest harm, and constant divine mercy. On a deeper Sufi level, this boundless, ego-less devotion can also be interpreted as the soul’s prayer for the Divine or the spiritual master, total surrender where the lover seeks nothing but the Beloved’s glory and closeness to God.

== 2018 film version ==
Nit Khair Manga Sohneya Main Teri was recreated for the 2018 Bollywood film Raid as a romantic Sufi ballad and was picturised on the leading pair of Ajay Devgn and Ileana D'Cruz. Composer Tanishk Bagchi recreated the music retaining the iconic hook line, Manoj Muntashir added new lyrics, and the soulful vocals were provided by Rahat Fateh Ali Khan, whose emotive rendition bridged the traditional qawwali depth with a contemporary appeal.
