= Mast Nazron Se Allah Bachaye =

Qawwali performed by Nusrat Fateh Ali Khan

Song by Nusrat Fateh Ali Khan
- Language: Urdu
- Released: 1983
- Genre: Qawwali
- Label: Oriental Star Agencies
- Composer: Nusrat Fateh Ali Khan
- Lyricists: Purnam Allahabadi; Nusrat Fateh Ali Khan; Farrukh Fateh Ali Khan

"Mast Nazron Se Allah Bachaye" (Urdu: مست نظروں سے اللہ بچائے transl. "May God save us from the intoxicating glances") is an Urdu qawwali that was originally composed and performed by Ustad Nusrat Fateh Ali Khan. The lyrics were written by Purnam Allahabadi, Nusrat Fateh Ali Khan, and Farrukh Fateh Ali Khan. Although Nusrat had been performing live renditions of Mast Nazron Se since the late 1970s, the first official live recording was released in 1983, followed by a studio version in 1984. Mast Nazron Se has been covered and recreated by a number of artists including Rahat Fateh Ali Khan and Jubin Nautiyal.

== Description ==
At its core, Mast Nazron Se can be understood as a sincere supplication to God, seeking protection from the distractions of worldly allure. Rather than speaking literally, the qawwali employs symbolic language and cultural imagery to convey deeper spiritual realities. The qawwali opens with a direct appeal to God, asking for salvation from "intoxicated glances" and the "moon-faced ones", which serve as metaphors for the allure of worldly beauty that may divert the seeker's attention from the remembrance of God. This central theme shapes the rest of the qawwali, which delves deeper into the duality of appearances and intentions. Moreover, the lyrics touch on the insincerity of those individuals who outwardly display piety while remaining inwardly attached to worldly desires. This tension between how someone presents themselves and what actually resides within them is a recurring theme throughout the qawwali. Set within the wider Islamic Sufi tradition, this qawwali reflects concerns about the distractions that pull seekers away from the inner spiritual path. In this light, Mast Nazron Se invites listeners to look beyond outward appearances and recognise the distinction between external form and inward reality, urging them to remain vigilant against the subtle ways in which worldly charm and attraction can obscure spiritual insight.
