= Damage: Live =

Live album by Sylvian/Fripp
- Released: 26 September 1994
- Recorded: 4 & 5 December 1993, mixed at Real World Studios, Box, Wiltshire, March 1994
- Genre: Alternative rock
- Label: Virgin
- Producer: David Bottrill, Robert Fripp

David Sylvian chronology
| Darshan (The Road To Graceland) (1993) | Damage: Live (1994) | Dead Bees on a Cake (1999) |

Robert Fripp chronology
| Darshan (The Road To Graceland) (1993) | Damage: Live (1994) | Vrooom (1994) |

Damage is a 1994 live album by David Sylvian and Robert Fripp. It was recorded on the "Road to Graceland" tour at London's Royal Albert Hall, December 1993.

This album, originally mixed by Fripp, was first released in 1994 as a limited edition box set: a 24-carat gold CD and 32-page colour booklet in a jewel box inside a cardboard slipcase. It was remixed by David Sylvian and re-released in standard jewel case packaging with different artwork on 10 September 2001.

The album contains mostly live renditions of songs from the 1993 album The First Day but also from Gone to Earth, as well as previously unreleased pieces. The song "Darshan: The Road to Graceland" was replaced by "Jean the Birdman" on the reissued version as Sylvian believed that this track would fit in better with the rest, and the track order was slightly changed.

== Background ==
The songs "Damage" and "The First Day" were only released on this album, and no studio versions has ever been released. "Blinding Light of Heaven", however, has a studio version on the limited edition third disc of Sylvian's compilation Everything and Nothing.

== Reception ==
Professional ratings
Review scores
| Source | Rating |
|---|---|
| Allmusic | 4/5 stars |
| Encyclopedia of Popular Music | 3/5 stars |

Paul Stump, in his 1997 History of Progressive Rock, called Damage: Live "a wonder of elegiac splendour."

== Track listing ==
1994 release

1. "Damage" (Robert Fripp, Trey Gunn, David Sylvian) – 4:31
2. "God's Monkey" (David Bottrill, Fripp, Gunn, Sylvian) – 6:42
3. "Brightness Falls" (Fripp, Gunn, Sylvian) – 6:29
4. "Every Colour You Are" (Richard Barbieri, Steve Jansen, Mick Karn, Sylvian) – 5:40
5. "Firepower" (Fripp, Gunn, Sylvian) – 7:02
6. "Gone to Earth" (Fripp, Sylvian) – 2:28
7. "20th Century Dreaming (A Shaman's Song)" (Fripp, Gunn, Sylvian) – 8:03
8. "Wave" (Sylvian) – 6:11
9. "River Man" (Sylvian) – 5:01
10. "Darshan (The Road to Graceland)" (Bottrill, Fripp, Gunn, Sylvian) – 10:47
11. "Blinding Light of Heaven" (Fripp, Gunn, Sylvian) – 4:15
12. "The First Day" (Fripp, Gunn, Sylvian) – 4:44

2001 re-release

1. "God's Monkey" (Sylvian, Fripp, Gunn, Botrill) – 6:39
2. "Brightness Falls" (Sylvian, Fripp, Gunn) – 6:29
3. "Every Colour You Are" (Sylvian, Karn, Jansen, Barbieri) – 5:44
4. "Jean the Birdman" (Sylvian, Fripp, Gunn) – 4:03
5. "Firepower" (Sylvian, Fripp, Gunn) – 7:09
6. "Damage" (Sylvian, Fripp, Gunn) – 4:26
7. "Gone to Earth" (Sylvian, Fripp) – 2:29
8. "Twentieth Century Dreaming (A Shaman's Song)" (Sylvian, Fripp, Gunn) – 7:54
9. "Wave" (Sylvian) – 6:17
10. "River Man" (Sylvian) – 4:58
11. "Blinding Light of Heaven" (Sylvian, Fripp, Gunn) – 4:36
12. "The First Day" (Sylvian, Fripp, Gunn) – 5:22

== Personnel ==
Musicians

- David Sylvian – lead vocals, guitar, keyboards, tapes
- Robert Fripp – lead guitar, electronics
- Michael Brook – Infinite Guitar
- Trey Gunn – Chapman Stick, backing vocals
- Pat Mastelotto – drums, percussion

Technical

- David Kent – sound engineer
- David Bottrill – mixing
- David Singleton – digital editing, assistant producer
- Stuart White – keyboard and recording technician
- Alan Pollard – keyboard and recording technician (U.K. and Europe)
- Steve Flewin – monitor engineer
- John Sinks – guitar technician
- Clint Lockyer – stick/drum technician
- Dave Newton – stage manager, keyboard/guitar technician
- Haruki Kaito – light and stage design
- Phil Wiffen – light operator
- Tim Hook – tour manager

Visual

- David Sylvian – art director
- Yuka Fuji – art director, visual projects co-ordinator
- Russell Mills – design
- Michael Webster – design assistance
- Masataka Nakano – artwork
- Shinro Ohtake – artwork (details)
- Kevin Westenburg – photography (live)
