= RockPaperScissors =

Studio album by Michael Brook
- Released: July 2006
- Genre: Electronic
- Length: 53:12
- Label: big Helium Entertainment/Canadian Rational/High Wire Music

RockPaperScissors is a 2006 album by Canadian electronic musician Michael Brook.

"When not recording in his Lavanderia studio located in the Hollywood Hills, Michael and his co-producer, multi-instrumentalist and arranger Rich Evans (of Peter Gabriel's band) traveled to Sofia, Bulgaria on behalf of this ambitious project, where they recorded local orchestral and choral ensembles. Into this mix, Brook introduced several vocalist/songwriters such as his former 4AD label mate Lisa Germano, Shira Myrow and Paul Buchanan from the Blue Nile".

== Reception ==
Professional ratings
Review scores
| Source | Rating |
|---|---|
| AllMusic | 3.5/5 stars |

YouTube music critic, Darren Lock, gave it a score of 3.5/5, noting that the album might've been too long with the addition of the two "Pasadena" tracks.

== Track listing ==
1. "Strange Procession" – 4:56
2. "Want" featuring Lisa Germano – 3:53
3. "Doges" – 3:55
4. "Darker Room" featuring Sir Richard Burton – 6:05
5. "Rock Paper Scissors" featuring Paul Buchanan – 3:54
6. "Tangerine" – 3:05
7. "Light Star" – 4:56
8. "Pond" featuring Nusrat Fateh Ali Khan – 4:18
9. "Silverized" – 3:52
10. "Pasadena, Part 1" featuring Ben Christophers – 3:14
11. "Pasadena, Part 2" – 11:08

== Musicians ==
- Ramy Autoun: drums
- Michael Brook: guitar, programming
- Paul Buchanan: vocals
- Bulgarian Studio Orchestra, Conductor in Bulgaria: Ognian Mitonov
- Richard Evans: string arrangement
- Shira Myrow: backing vocals
- Quinn: percussion
- Brett Simons: bass

== Writing and production ==
- Shira Myrow (Shira Myrow Music/ASCAP)
- Michael Brook (Canadian Rational/ASCAP)
- Produced by Michael Brook and Richard Evans
- Executive Producer/A&R: Hugo Vereker
- Recorded by Richard Evans, Michael Brook and Craig Conard. Additional engineering by David Donaldson
