= Afreen Afreen =

Song performed by Nusrat Fateh Ali Khan

Song by Nusrat Fateh Ali Khan

from the album Sangam
- Language: Urdu
- Released: 1996
- Genre: Ghazal
- Length: 10:00
- Composer: Nusrat Fateh Ali Khan
- Lyricist: Javed Akhtar

"Afreen Afreen" (Urdu: آفریں آفریں transl. Praise to her Creator! Praise to her Creator!) is a nazm (song) composed and performed by Nusrat Fateh Ali Khan with lyrics written by Javed Akhtar. It first featured on their collaborative album Sangam in 1996. In 2003, a studio version of the song was recorded by Nusrat's nephew Rahat Fateh Ali Khan for the album Best of Khan 3, released by Hi-Tech Music Ltd. In 2016, it was covered by Rahat Fateh Ali Khan and Momina Mustehsan during season 9 of Coke Studio.

== 2003 Studio Version by Rahat Fateh Ali Khan ==
A lesser-known yet deeply soulful rendition of "Afreen Afreen" was recorded as a studio track by Rahat Fateh Ali Khan and released in 2003 by UK-based label Hi-Tech Music Ltd. This version was included in the compilation album Best of Khan 3. Unlike the original qawwali by Nusrat Fateh Ali Khan and the later Coke Studio duet, this recording features a stripped-down musical arrangement and a solo vocal performance by Rahat Fateh Ali Khan, emphasizing emotional depth and spiritual longing. The lyrics remain largely faithful to the traditional verses, while the vocal style leans more toward romantic Sufi interpretation. Though it did not receive widespread media coverage, it remains a favorite among devoted fans of South Asian devotional and classical fusion music.

== 1996 version ==
"Afreen Afreen" was first released during the IndiPop and fusion music wave of the mid-1990s as a non-film music video. The music video featured Lisa Ray and Himanshu Malik.

== 2016 version ==
"Afreen Afreen"
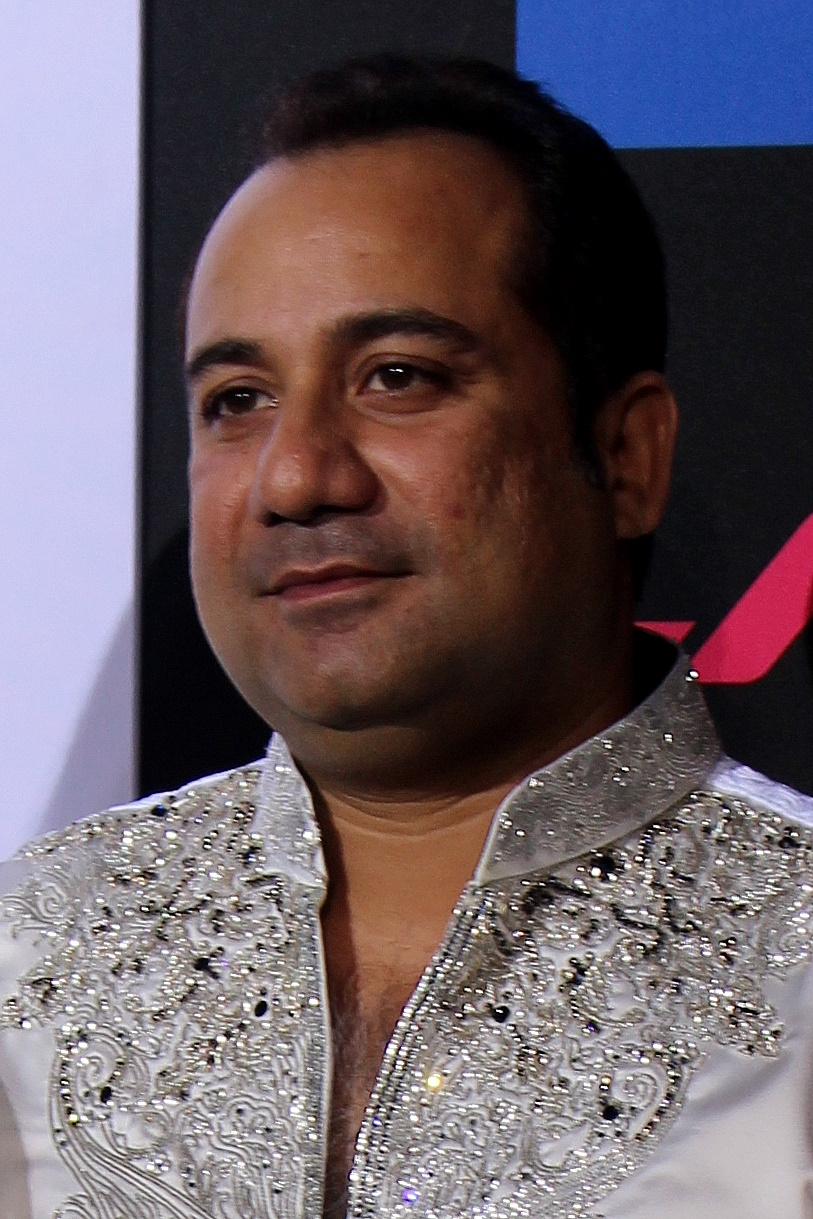
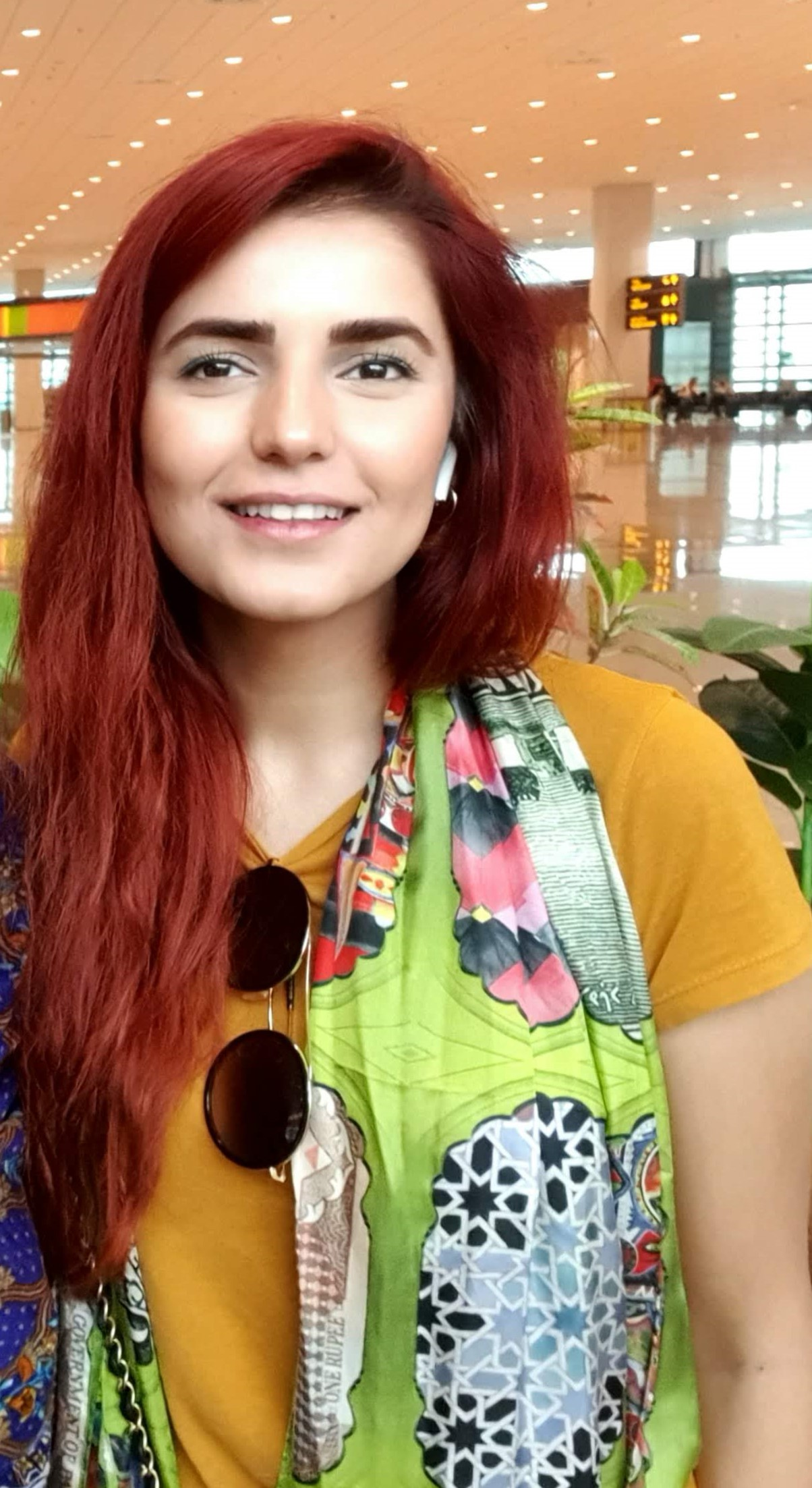
- Rahat Fateh Ali Khan Momina Mustehsan

Single by Rahat Fateh Ali Khan and Momina Mustehsan

from the album Coke Studio S9E2
- Released: 19 August 2016
- Genre: Pop
- Length: 6:45 (Video); 6:40 (Audio)
- Label: Coke Studio (Pakistan)
- Composers: Nusrat Fateh Ali Khan (original); Faakhir Mehmood (director)
- Lyricists: Javed Akhtar (original); F K Khalish (additional)
- Producers: Coca-Cola and Strings
External media
Audio
- "Afreen Afreen" on SoundCloud
Video
- "Afreen Afreen" on YouTube

It was later rendered by Rahat Fateh Ali Khan with Momina Mustehsan, during season 9 episode 2 of Pakistani musical TV show Coke Studio. The music was directed by Faakhir Mehmood.

=== Personnel ===
- Lyricist: Javed Akhtar
- Artists: Rahat Fateh Ali Khan & Momina Mustehsan
- Music director: Faakhir Mehmood
- Produced & directed By: Strings
- Guest musician: Joshua Keith Benjamin (keyboards)
- House band: Imran Akhond (guitars), Aahad Nayani (drums), Kamran 'Mannu' Zafar (bass), Kashan Admani (guitars), Haider Alo (keyboard/piano), Abdul Aziz Kazi (percussions)
- Backing vocalist: Rachel Viccaji, Shahab Hussain, Nimra Rafiq

=== Popularity ===
As of June 2024, it has garnered over 509 million views on YouTube, it is currently third on the list of most viewed YouTube videos of Pakistani-origin, just after Atif Aslam's rendition of "Tajdar-e-Haram" having 342 million views. It was the most-watched Pakistani music video of 2016. According to Google, its lyrics were one of the most searched lyrics for the year 2017. Momina Mustehsan became the fifth-most googled person in Pakistan in 2016.

== Version listings ==
1996 version
| No. | Title | Length |
|---|---|---|
| 1. | "Afreen Afreen" | 10:00 |

2016 version
| No. | Title | Length |
|---|---|---|
| 1. | "Afreen Afreen" | 6:45 |

2003 version
| No. | Title | Length |
|---|---|---|
| 1. | "Afreen Afreen" | 6:40 |

== Table of contents ==
| Year | Film/Album | Genre | Language(s) | Length | Singer | Composer | Ref(s). |
|---|---|---|---|---|---|---|---|
| 1990 | Sangam | Ghazal | Urdu | 10:00 | Nusrat Fateh Ali Khan | Nusrat Fateh Ali Khan | |
| 2016 | Coke Studio S9E2 | Pop | Urdu | 6:45 | Rahat Fateh Ali Khan & Momina Mustehsan | Fakhar Mehmood | |

== See also ==
- Tajdar-e-Haram
- Tera Woh Pyar
- Nusrat Fateh Ali Khan discography
- Rahat Fateh Ali Khan discography
- Coke Studio (Pakistani season 9)
