= Hybrid (Michael Brook album) =

Studio album by Michael Brook with Brian Eno and Daniel Lanois
- Released: 26 July 1985
- Studio: Bob and Daniel Lanois Studio, Hamilton, Ontario, Canada
- Genre: Ambient, IDM
- Length: 41:56
- Label: Editions EG EGED 41
- Producer: Michael Brook, Brian Eno, Daniel Lanois

Michael Brook chronology
Hybrid (1985)	Sleeps with the Fishes (1987)

Brian Eno chronology
Thursday Afternoon (1985)	Hybrid (1985)	Music for Films III (1988)

Hybrid is the debut album by Canadian guitarist Michael Brook in collaboration with Brian Eno and Daniel Lanois. It was released in 1985 on Editions EG.

A specialist in timbre and texture, Brook pioneered the infinite guitar—a guitar outfitted with a feedback transducer to produce non-decaying sustain of any note—which makes its first notable appearance on this album.

== Critical reception ==
Professional ratings
Review scores
Source	Rating
AllMusic	4/5 stars

The New York Times wrote that the album "includes hints of Middle Eastern singing and African drumming, subsumed into sustained sounds from Mr. Brook's guitar and Brian Eno's keyboard, all in a misty, faraway sound mix."

== Track listing ==
All compositions by Michael Brook.

1. "Hybrid" – 6:18
2. "Distant Village" – 4:03
3. "Mimosa" – 6:20
4. "Pond Life" – 3:40
5. "Ocean Motion" – 5:50
6. "Midday" – 5:59
7. "Earth Floor" – 4:45
8. "Vacant" – 5:00

== Personnel ==
- Michael Brook: Guitars (all tracks), "Infinite Guitar" (tracks 1, 6-8), Steel guitar (track 2), bass (tracks 1, 3 5-8, with "buzz bass" on tracks 3 and 5), Mbira (tracks 2, 3, 7 and 8), Vibraphone (track 3), Percussion (tracks 1 and 5-7)
- Brian Eno: Effect treatments (tracks 1 and 3, 5-8), Piano (tracks 2, 3 and 5), Bass (tracks 6 and 8), Swamp Percussion (track 2), Wind Sounds (track 3), Synthesizers (track 8)
- Daniel Lanois: Effect Treatments (1, 2 and 7)
- Gordon Phillips: Northumbrian Pipes (track 3), Cricket Recording (track 4)
- Dick Smith: Congas (track 6), Percussion (track 7)

Production

- Produced by Michael Brook, Daniel Lanois and Brian Eno
- Recorded by David Bottril
- Mixed by Michael Brook (tracks 1-3), Brian Eno (tracks 4, 5, 6, 8), Daniel Lanois (track 7)
