= Dust to Gold (Nusrat Fateh Ali Khan album) =

2000 album by Nusrat Fateh Ali Khan

Studio album by Nusrat Fateh Ali Khan
- Released: 2000
- Recorded: 1997
- Genre: Qawwali
- Length: 64:22
- Label: Real World Records

Dust to Gold is a qawwali album by Nusrat Fateh Ali Khan, recorded in 1997 and released posthumously in 2000 by Real World Records. The recordings were made with a backing ensemble in traditional form and were sourced from archived material uncovered in Lahore.

== Reception ==
Jazz Times described the quality of posthumous releases from Khan as uneven overall, but found Dust to Gold to be worth listening to, noting that its four tracks illustrated the balance between improvisational freedom and control in Khan's vocals, complemented by his ensemble.

Exclaim! observed that Khan's voice on the recording showed signs of strain attributed to health issues, and suggested the album was better suited to listeners already familiar with his career than to newcomers, while acknowledging that the recordings reflected his enduring commitment to the music.

AllMusic noted occasional additional raspiness in Khan's voice but found the music fresh and the tempos energised. The review awarded three out of five stars and suggested that further recordings of comparable quality from the same sessions would merit release.

Norway's Dagsavisen, reviewing Dust to Gold alongside Live at the Royal Albert Hall, found Khan's music accessible to Western listeners and characterised the recordings as a continuation rather than a departure within his discography.

== Track listing ==
1. "Khawaja tum hi ho" – 15:44
2. "Data teira durbar" – 16:21
3. "Koi hai na ho ga" – 15:08
4. "Noor-e-khuda hai husn-e-sarapa rasool" – 17:09
