= Star Rise =

Remix album by Nusrat Fateh Ali Khan and Michael Brook
- Released: 1997
- Genres: Qawwali, bhangra, dub, worldbeat
- Length: 58:30
- Label: Real World Records
- Producer: Michael Brook

Nusrat Fateh Ali Khan and Michael Brook chronology
Night Song (1996)	Star Rise (1997)

Professional ratings
Review scores
Source	Rating
Allmusic	3/5 stars
Uncut	3/5 stars

Star Rise is a remix from two previous Nusrat Fateh Ali Khan–Michael Brook collaborations. The album was dedicated to the memory of Khan, who died in August 1997, prior to the album's release posthumously by Real World Records later the same year.

Tracks 1, 2, 5, 6, and 8 are remixed from the 1996 album Night Song. Tracks 3, 4, 7, and 9 are remixed from the 1990 album Mustt Mustt.

According to the Star Rise liner notes, the Nitin Sawhney remix of Tracery, created after Khan's death, is the only track not to receive Khan's feedback.

== Track listing ==
No.	Title	Artist(s)	Length
1.	"Sweet Pain"	(Joi Remix)	06:17
2.	"My Heart, My Life"	(Talvin Singh Remix)	08:03
3.	"Taa Deem"	(Asian Dub Foundation Remix)	04:51
4.	"Shadow"	(State of Bengal Remix)	07:27
5.	"Longing"	(Aki Nawaz Remix)	07:43
6.	"My Comfort Remains"	(Black Star Liner Remix)	02:57
7.	"Tracery"	(Nitin Sawhney Remix)	07:46
8.	"Lament"	(Earthtribe Remix)	07:15
9.	"Nothing Without You/Tery Bina"	(The Dhol Foundation and Fun-Da-Mental Remix)	06:03
Total length:			58:30
