= Intoxicated Spirit =

Live album by Nusrat Fateh Ali Khan
- Released: 1996
- Genre: Qawwali
- Label: Shanachie

Nusrat Fateh Ali Khan chronology
Night Song (1996)	Intoxicated Spirit (1996)	Mega Star (1996)

Intoxicated Spirit is a live album by the Pakistani musician Nusrat Fateh Ali Khan, released in 1996. He is credited with his troupe, Party. Khan supported the album with a North American tour.

Intoxicated Spirit was nominated for a Grammy Award for "Best Traditional Folk Album".

== Production ==
Khan's voice was accompanied by the voices of his troupe as well as by tablas and harmonium. The album was recorded in Pakistan.

== Critical reception ==
Professional ratings
Review scores
Source	Rating
AllMusic	3/5 stars
Robert Christgau	A−
(The New) Rolling Stone Album Guide	4/5 stars

Robert Christgau asked: "Do you want the most awesome singer in the known universe manifesting his proximity to the divine for your voyeuristic delectation?"; he wrote that the album's "Sufi ecstasy runs so close to the surface, far wilder than on Real World's equally uncut The Last Prophet." Newsday determined that "the western trappings of his recent performances ... are gone, allowing [Khan] to weave his tapestry of Sufi poetry and driving percussion unfettered."

The Washington Post noted that "such songs as 'Ruk Pe Rehmat Ka' attain a transcendent elation that trippy Anglo-American rock has sought, intermittently, for some 30 years." The Chicago Reader concluded that, "for all of its charm the recent Intoxicated Spirit ... doesn’t feature lengthy flights as much as his other recordings have."

AllMusic wrote that "the sound is crisp and unfettered, decidedly less rich than on the Real World sessions, but good enough to let the listener enjoy another incendiary Nusrat session."

== Track listing ==
No.	Title	Length
1.	"Yeh Jo Halka Halka"
2.	"Ruk Pe Rehmat Ka"
3.	"Be Wafa"
4.	"Meri Saqi Saqi Yeh"
