= The Day, the Night, the Dawn, the Dusk =

Studio album by Nusrat Fateh Ali Khan
- Released: 1991
- Genre: Qawwali
- Length: 54:14
- Label: Shanachie

Nusrat Fateh Ali Khan chronology
Shahbaaz (1991)	The Day, the Night, the Dawn, the Dusk (1991)	Devotional Songs (1992)

The Day, the Night, the Dawn, the Dusk is an album by the Pakistani musician Nusrat Fateh Ali Khan, released in 1991.

== Critical reception ==
Professional ratings
Review scores
Source	Rating
AllMusic	4/5 stars
Spin Alternative Record Guide	5/10

The Washington Post wrote that "the lyrics, which embrace both Sufi mysticism and more down-to-earth matters of the heart, are sung, chanted and declaimed, adding to qawwali's alternately hypnotic and cathartic appeal and easily compensating for the language barrier."

== Track listing ==
All tracks written by Nusrat Fateh Ali Khan.

1. "Halka Halka Suroor" – 18:43
2. "Mera Piya Ghar Aaya" – 7:59
3. "Main Jana Jogi De Naal" – 26:57

== Personnel ==
- Nusrat Fateh Ali Khan – vocals
- Tim Hall – photography
- Anita Karl – artwork, cover design, hand lettering
- Robert Vosgien – digital mastering
