= Michael Brook =

Canadian musician (born 1951)

- Born: 1952 (age 73–74)
- Origin: Toronto, Ontario, Canada
- Genres: Post-rock; folk rock; electronic rock; experimental rock; soundtrack
- Occupations: Musician; inventor; film score composer
- Instruments: Guitar; keyboards; bass; drums; percussion
- Labels: Real World; E.G.; 4AD
- Website: michaelbrookmusic.com

Michael Brook (born 1952) is a Canadian guitarist, inventor, music producer, and film music composer. He plays in many genres, including rock, electronica, world music, minimalism and film scores. His collaborations with musicians around the world have made him "one of the most sought-after producers in the music industry." Born in Toronto, Ontario, Canada, Brook lives in Los Angeles. He is the creator of the Infinite Guitar.

== Career ==
Brook studied music and electronics at York University and worked as an engineer at the Grant Avenue studios, then owned by the Lanois brothers. Here he worked with Brian Eno, The Edge, Jon Hassell and Harold Budd. In 1985 he released his first solo album Hybrid, containing instrumental tracks with Indian and African elements.

Another notable collaboration was Sleeps with the Fishes with Clan of Xymox member Pieter Nooten (4AD, 1987). He worked on the album Set by Youssou N'Dour, Miss America by Mary Margaret O'Hara and collaborated with Nusrat Fateh Ali Khan on the album Mustt Mustt.

He toured as a member of the Sylvian and Fripp tour group, with the final concert at the Royal Albert Hall in December 1993 documented on the album Damage: Live. He also opened the concerts with a solo set, featuring the Infinite Guitar with effects and sequencer backing. In 1998, he produced the album "Volcán: Tributo a José José", a tribute album to singer Jose Jose. In 2006, the solo album RockPaperScissors was released, with an ambient remix version following in 2007. Brook toured small venues in Canada and the United States in late January/early February, 2007. In writing about his score for the film 2015 film Brooklyn, Variety said the film was "buoyed along by a beautiful Michael Brook score and The Hollywood Reporter praised his "evocative scoring."

== Awards and honors ==
He was nominated for a Grammy Award in 1996 for his production work and as a co-artist on Pakistani singer Nusrat Fateh Ali Khan's album Night Song.

Brook's soundtrack to Into the Wild was nominated for a Golden Globe Award in 2008.

He also contributed a track to The Edge's soundtrack for the film Captive (1986). Brook's Infinite Guitar was later utilized by The Edge on U2's The Joshua Tree (1987).

Two films that he scored, Brooklyn and Aloft, premiered at the Sundance Film Festival in 2015.

He won ASCAP awards in 2011 for The Fighter and 2013 for The Vow. He won the Havana Film Festival award for best music in 2011 for El Infierno.

== Selected discography ==
=== Studio and live albums ===
Year	Artists	Title	Details
1985	Michael Brook with Brian Eno and Daniel Lanois	Hybrid: Released: 26 July 1985; Label: Editions EG (EGED 41); Formats: LP, CD	
1986	Jon Hassell	Power Spot: Released: 29 September 1986; Label: ECM (ECM 1327); Formats: LP, CD	Brook plays infinite guitar on three tracks
1987	Pieter Nooten and Michael Brook	Sleeps with the Fishes: Released: 12 October 1987; Label: 4AD (CAD 710); Formats: LP, CD	
1990	Nusrat Fateh Ali Khan	Mustt Mustt: Released: 14 February 1990; Label: Real World (RW 15); Formats: LP, CD	First collaboration with Khan; credited only to Khan
1992	Michael Brook	Cobalt Blue: Released: 1 June 1992; Label: 4AD (CAD 2007); Formats: CD	Reissued together in 1999 as a 2-CD set titled Cobalt Blue & Live at the Aquarium
1992	Michael Brook	Live at the Aquarium - London Zoo 21 May 1992: Released: 21 September 1992; Label: 4AD (TAD 2011); Formats: limited edition CD	Reissued together in 1999 as a 2-CD set titled Cobalt Blue & Live at the Aquarium
1994	David Sylvian and Robert Fripp	Damage: Live: Released: 1 October 1994; Label: Virgin (DAMAGE 1); Formats: CD	Featuring Michael Brook
1995	U. Srinivas and Michael Brook	Dream: Released: 29 August 1995; Label: Real World (RW 47); Formats: CD	Featuring Trey Gunn
1995	Michael Brook	Shona: Released: 1995; Label: Sine (SIN002); Formats: CD	Unofficial release, recorded live during the Lanzarote Music Festival, December 1989
1996	Nusrat Fateh Ali Khan and Michael Brook	Night Song: Released: 20 February 1996; Label: Real World (RW 50); Formats: CD	Second collaboration with Khan
1997	Iarla Ó Lionáird with Michael Brook	The Seven Steps to Mercy (Seacht gCoiscéim Na Trocaire): Released: 22 September 1997; Label: Real World (RW 67); Formats: CD	
1997	Nusrat Fateh Ali Khan and Michael Brook	Nusrat Fateh Ali Khan and Michael Brook Remixed: Star Rise: Released: 6 October 1997; Label: Real World (RW 68); Formats: CD, 2LP	Last collaboration with Khan; features remixes of tracks from Mustt Mustt and Night Song
1998	Djivan Gasparyan and Michael Brook	Black Rock: Released: 7 September 1998; Label: Real World (RW 73); Formats: CD	
2001	Hukwe Zawose and Michael Brook	Assembly: Released: 29 October 2001; Label: Real World (RW 100); Formats: CD	
2006	Michael Brook	RockPaperScissors: Released: 18 July 2006; Label: Canadian Rational/bigHelium Entertainment (CRBHE002); Formats: CD	
2007	Michael Brook	BellCurve: Released: 23 October 2007; Label: Canadian Rational/bigHelium Entertainment (CRBHE010); Formats: CD	Remix album of RockPaperScissors by James Hood
2008	Djivan Gasparyan and Michael Brook	Penumbra: Released: 23 September 2008; Label: Canadian Rational (CR 1011); Formats: CD	Second collaboration with Gasparyan

=== Soundtracks ===
- Captive (1986) – co-writer/producer with The Edge.
- Heat (1995)
- Albino Alligator (1996)
- Affliction (1997)
- Getting to Know You (1999)
- Crime and Punishment in Suburbia (2000)
- Mission: Impossible 2 (2000)
- Black Hawk Down (2001) - music composed by Hans Zimmer
- Charlotte Sometimes (2002)
- India: Kingdom of the Tiger (2002)
- An Inconvenient Truth (2006)
- Who Killed the Electric Car? (2006)
- Tre (2007)
- Into the Wild (2007)
- Americanese (2008)
- Road, Movie (2009)
- Morning (2010)
- 9500 Liberty (2010)
- The Fighter (2010)
- Country Strong (2010)
- El Infierno (2010)
- Darwin (2011)
- Undefeated (2011)
- The Perks of Being a Wallflower (2012)
- Cas and Dylan (2013)
- Aloft (2015)
- Brooklyn (2015)
- Tallulah (2016)
- Stronger (2017)
- My Days of Mercy (2017)
- Le Brio (2017)
- Giant Little Ones (2019)

== See also ==
- List of ambient music artists
