= Mustt Mustt =

Studio album by Nusrat Fateh Ali Khan
- Released: 12 November 1990
- Genres: Qawwali, world fusion
- Length: 49:43
- Label: Real World
- Producer: Michael Brook

Nusrat Fateh Ali Khan chronology
Shahen-Shah (1988)	Mustt Mustt (1990)	Magic Touch (1991)

Michael Brook chronology
Sleeps with the Fishes (1987)	Mustt Mustt (1990)	Cobalt Blue (1992)

Mustt Mustt is the first Qawwali fusion album collaboration between singer Nusrat Fateh Ali Khan and guitarist and producer Michael Brook, although the album itself is credited purely to Khan. It was rock musician Peter Gabriel who suggested that Brook and Khan work together. It was released in 1990 on Gabriel's Real World Records label.

This album, along with Night Song, contributed tracks to the remix album Star Rise.

The song "Mustt Mustt" was remixed by British trip hop group Massive Attack and was a club hit in the United Kingdom, being the first song in Urdu to reach the British charts. It was later used in an advert for Coca-Cola. Real World Records, the label which released the album, claimed that the album sold over 600,000 copies outside the Indian subcontinent.

== Reception ==
Professional ratings
Review scores
Source	Rating
Allmusic	4.5/5 stars

Mustt Mustt was voted one of the Top 100 albums of the 1990s by American music magazine Alternative Press. It reached No. 14 on the Billboard Top World Music Albums chart in 1991. David Lynch of The Austin Chronicle called the album a "seminal fusion". British musician Nitin Sawhney said that it "changed the face of British music forever". It was considered a "secularized" or "Western" version of Khan's other Qawwali albums.

== Track listing ==
1. "Mustt Mustt (Lost in His Work)" (Nusrat Fateh Ali Khan) – 5:15
2. "Nothing Without You (Tery Bina)" (Khan) – 5:04
3. "Tracery" (Michael Brook) – 4:48
4. "The Game" (Robert Ahwai, Brook, Khan) – 4:59
5. "Taa Deem" (Khan) – 4:47
6. "Sea of Vapours" (Brook) – 3:55
7. "Fault Lines" (Brook) – 4:13
8. "Tana Dery Na" (Brook, Khan) – 4:23
9. "Shadow" (Khan) – 3:04
10. "Avenue" (Brook) – 4:51
11. "Mustt Mustt (Massive Attack remix)" (Khan) – 4:24

== Charts ==
Chart (1991)	Peak position
US World Albums (Billboard)	14
