= Dildar Hussain =

Pakistani percussionist (born 1957)

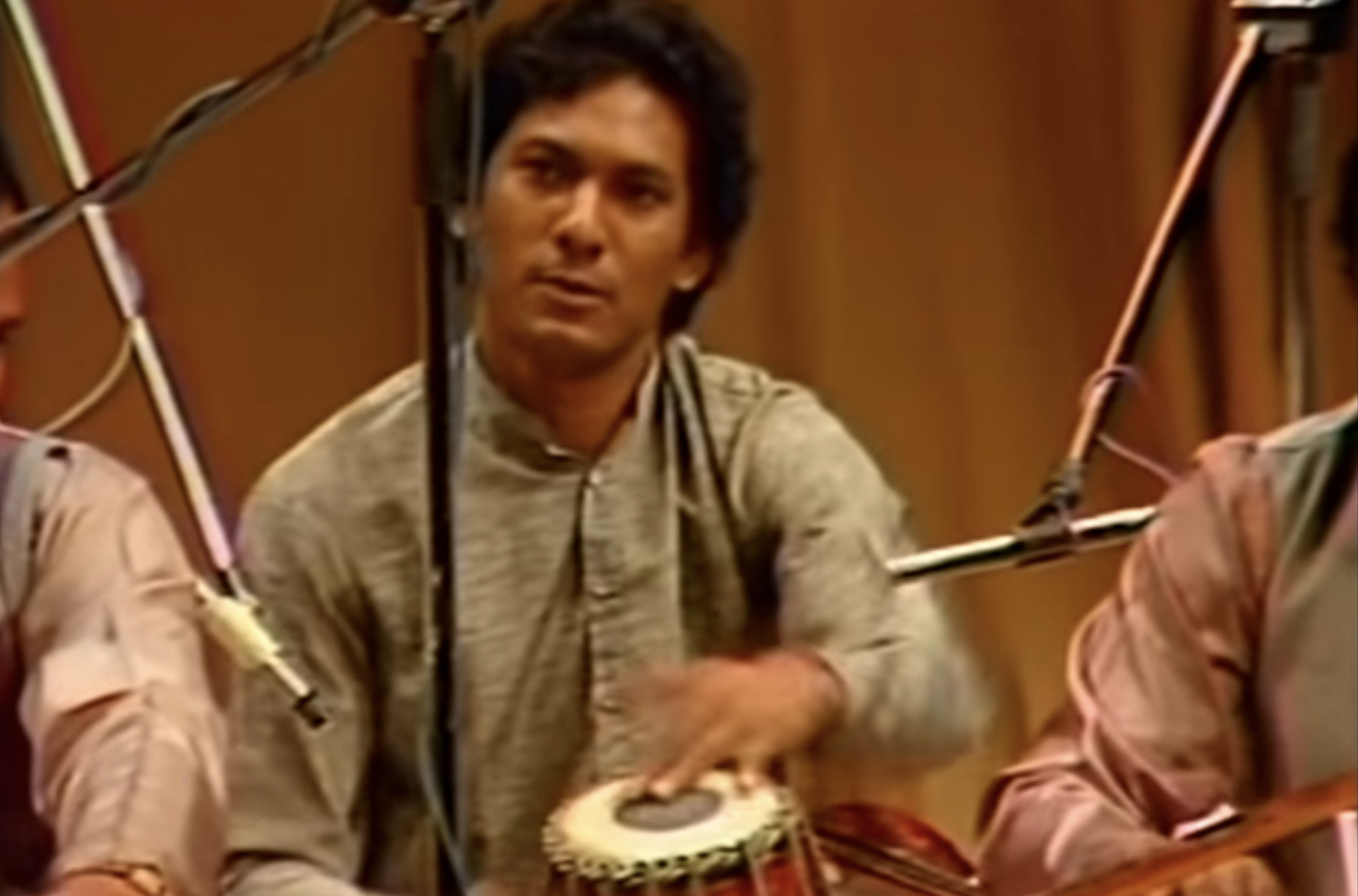
- Born: 1957 (age 68–69); Kasur, Punjab, Pakistan

Dildar Hussain (born 1957) is a Pakistani percussionist and tabla player. He is known for being the left-handed tabla player for the renowned Qawwali singer Nusrat Fateh Ali Khan. Dildar Hussain played tabla in Nusrat's qawwali-singing group until Nusrat died in 1997. Dildar Hussain belongs to the Punjab gharana of tabla-playing music artists. He is a disciple of Ustad Allah Rakha.

== Career ==
He was born in Kasur, Punjab, Pakistan in 1957. Dildar Hussain's father was also a tabla player. Dildar Hussain initially learned tabla-playing from Ustad Alla Rakha, a renowned veteran tabla player of Punjab gharana in Pakistan. His first performance was in India in 1969. Then he joined Nusrat Fateh Ali Khan's original group back in 1971, at the age of 14, and stayed with that group for 30 years. While Dildar Hussain played tabla with Nusrat Fateh Ali Khan's group, his training in tabla-playing continued with Ustad Nusrat. Since Nusrat Fateh Ali Khan's death, Ustad Dildar Hussain has continued the tabla-playing tradition with his sons. His eldest son Abrar and his youngest son Israr are following the family tradition, and are, like their father, working as tabla players.

Aminah Chishti, a female US national approached Dildar Hussain sometimes after 2001, to ask him to teach her the art of tabla-playing. Her interest towards qawwali and Sufism began when she was given a Nusrat Fateh Ali Khan music cassette around 2001. Inspired by the qawwali music, Jessica Ripper converted to Islam and changed her name to Aminah Chishti. She and her qawwali group have performed at a number of Sufi shrines and festivals in Pakistan since 2001.

Ustad Dildar Hussain does not play the traditional tabla that can be seen in Hindustani classical music but instead plays a combination of "jori" as the treble, and "dhamma" as the bass to create a deeper, warmer sound than the modern tabla set creates. This style created with the intention to carry sound acoustically.
