= Ocora =

French record label

- Parent company: Radio France
- Founded: 1957
- Founder: Charles Duvelle, Pierre Schaeffer
- Genre: World music, field recordings
- Country of origin: France

Ocora (Office de Coopération Radiophonique) is a French record label specializing in field recordings of world music. It was founded in 1957 by the composer, pianist and musicologist Charles Duvelle with the musician Pierre Schaeffer. Ocora is part of Radio France.

Ocora also is a word from the language of the Timucuan people who once inhabited Florida USA, meaning "place of gathering."

On 14 April 1962 SORAFOM became the Office de coopération radiophonique (OCORA), whose members became advisors. On 1 January 1969 OCORA was absorbed by ORTF. Charles Duvelle, who had created and directed the prestigious OCORA collection (records of traditional world music) since 1960, integrated it into the musical services of the DAEC (Direction des affaires extérieures et de la coopération), which he was newly in charge of within ORTF.
