= Dead Man Walking (soundtrack) =

Soundtrack album from the film Dead Man Walking by Various Artists
- Released: 1996
- Genre: Soundtrack
- Length: 45:47
- Label: Columbia

Dead Man Walking is a soundtrack album to the film of the same name, released in 1996 on Columbia Records. The album contains twelve tracks by major artists, including a title track by Bruce Springsteen, which was nominated for the Academy Award for Best Original Song but lost to "Colors of the Wind" from the Walt Disney film Pocahontas.

== Overview ==
The album is a collection of music thematically linked to the 1995 film Dead Man Walking. Although all the songs were inspired by the storyline, only four of them were featured in their entirety in the movie. A separate album of the film's instrumental score, composed by David Robbins, was released by Columbia Records in April 1996.

The film's executive producers, brothers Tim and David Robbins, personally solicited a number of their favorite musicians for contributions to the project. "We contacted artists we particularly admired," said David. The contributors were provided with scripts, rough cuts, and other materials to help inspire their work. Many of the resulting pieces have lyrical content based on particular characters – Suzanne Vega wrote her song from the perspective of the nun, Sister Helen Prejean; Steve Earle took the point of view of a prison guard; and Bruce Springsteen, in the film's title track, spoke as the convict himself.

== Critical reception ==
Professional ratings
Review scores
Source	Rating
AllMusic	4/5 stars
Robert Christgau	(neither)
Q	4/5 stars
Rolling Stone	5/5 stars

Springsteen performed his song "Dead Man Walkin'" at the 68th Academy Awards, where it was nominated for Best Original Song. In a review for the album's tenth anniversary, critic Stephen Thomas Erlewine called it "one of those rare soundtracks that is as compelling as the film itself".

== Track listing ==
#	Title	Performer	Length
1	"Dead Man Walkin'"	Bruce Springsteen	2:43
2	"In Your Mind"	Johnny Cash	4:14
3	"Woman on the Tier (I'll See You Through)"	Suzanne Vega	2:25
4	"Promises"	Lyle Lovett	3:03
5	"The Face of Love"	Nusrat Fateh Ali Khan with Eddie Vedder	5:39
6	"The Fall of Troy"	Tom Waits	2:59
7	"Quality of Mercy"	Michelle Shocked	3:38
8	"Dead Man Walking (A Dream Like This)"	Mary Chapin Carpenter	3:34
9	"Walk Away"	Tom Waits	2:43
10	"Ellis Unit One"	Steve Earle	4:39
11	"Walkin Blind"	Patti Smith	4:39
12	"The Long Road"	Eddie Vedder with Nusrat Fateh Ali Khan	5:31

== Charts ==
Chart (1996)	Peak position
Australian Albums (ARIA)	22
Austrian Albums (Ö3 Austria)	28
Belgian Albums (Ultratop Flanders)	26
Belgian Albums (Ultratop Wallonia)	49
German Albums (Offizielle Top 100)	70
Swiss Albums (Schweizer Hitparade)	45
US Billboard 200	61

== Release history ==
Year	Label	Format	Catalog
1996	Columbia	CD	
2006	Columbia	CD	76660
