= Nusrat Fateh Ali Khan =

Pakistani singer-songwriter (1948–1997)

Ustad Nusrat Fateh Ali Khan PP
- نصرت فتح علی خان
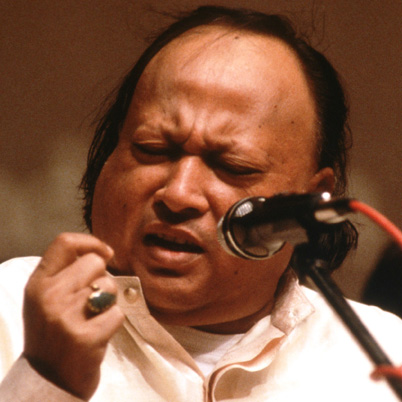
- Khan performing at the WOMAD festival in Reading, c. 1993
- Born: Pervez Fateh Ali Khan; 13 October 1948; Lyallpur, West Punjab, Pakistan
- Died: 16 August 1997 (aged 48); London, England
- Burial place: Ustad Nusrat Fateh Ali Khan, Memorial, Jhang Road Graveyard, Faisalabad
- Other name: NFAK
- Occupations: Singer; songwriter; musician; music director
- Spouse: Naheed Nusrat (m. 1979)
- Father: Fateh Ali Khan
- Relatives: Farrukh Fateh Ali Khan (brother); Mubarak Ali Khan (uncle); Badar Miandad (cousin); Sher Miandad Khan (cousin); Rahat Fateh Ali Khan (nephew); Rizwan-Muazzam (nephews)
- Musical career
- Also known as: Shahanshah-e-Qawwali (lit. 'the King of Kings of Qawwali')
- Genres: Classical; folk (Punjabi); sufi; world
- Instruments: Vocals; harmonium; tabla
- Years active: 1964–1997
- Labels: Real World; OSA; EMI; Virgin Records

Ustad Nusrat Fateh Ali Khan (Note: Punjabi: نصرت فتح علی خاں, pronounced [nʊsˈɾət ˈfəte(ɦ) əliː ˈxãː]; born Pervez Fateh Ali Khan) (13 October 1948 – 16 August 1997), also known as NFAK, was a Pakistani singer, Hindustani classical vocalist, songwriter, multi-instrumentalist, composer, and music director. While primarily being associated with qawwali, a form of Sufi devotional music from Pakistan and India, he belonged to the historic Qawwal Bachchon ka Gharana (Delhi Gharana) and was trained in pure classical khayal architecture under his father Ustad Fateh Ali Khan and later uncle Ustad Mubarak Ali Khan and Ustad Salamat Ali Khan. Though widely celebrated for his qawwali performances, his standing as a master of Shastriya Sangeet (classical music) was validated by the classical community when he received the Hafiz Ali Khan Award in 1997. He ranks as one of the most influential South Asian singers of all time. Widely recognised as the "Shahanshah-e-Qawwali" (lit. 'the King of Kings of Qawwali'), he has been recognised as one of the 50 Great Voices by NPR and 200 Greatest Singers of All Time by Rolling Stone. The New York Times named Khan the greatest qawwali singer of his generation. while Credited with introducing Qawwali music to international audiences, he was known for his vocal abilities and could perform at a high level of intensity for several hours.

Born in West Punjab, Khan had his first public performance at the age of 15 at his father's chelum. He became the head of the family qawwali party in 1971 and added his unique style of sargam, khayal, and rhythm to his family's legacy. He was signed by Oriental Star Agencies, based in Birmingham, England, in the early 1980s. Khan went on to release movie scores and albums in Europe, India, Japan, Pakistan, and the United States. He engaged in collaborations and experiments with Western artists, becoming a well-known world music artist. He toured extensively, performing in over 40 countries. In addition to popularising qawwali music, he also had a profound impact on contemporary South Asian popular music, including Pakistani pop, Indian pop, and Bollywood music. He was also a master of Hindustani classical music.

== Biography ==
=== Early life ===
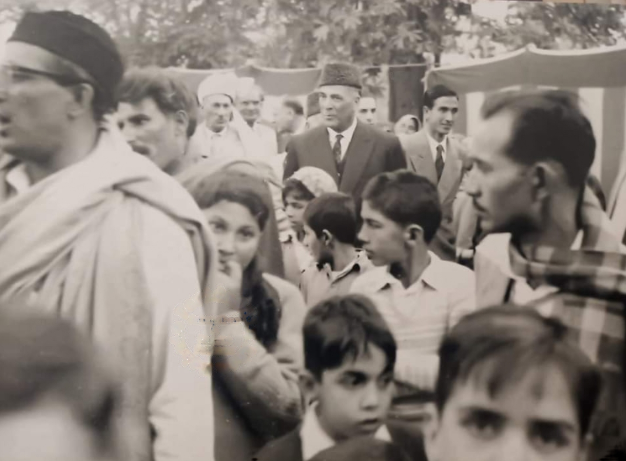
General Burki and a young Nusrat Fateh Ali Khan (biting his finger) pictured at a wedding in Jalandhar, December 1961

Khan was born into a Punjabi Muslim family in Lyallpur in 1948. Khan's family belonged to Jalandhar. His ancestors learned music and singing there and adopted it as a profession. He was the fifth child and first son of Fateh Ali Khan, a musicologist, vocalist, instrumentalist, and qawwal. Nusrat, who had four older sisters and a younger brother, Farrukh Fateh Ali Khan, grew up in central Faisalabad. The tradition of qawwali in the family has been passed down through successive generations for almost 600 years. This qawwali tradition has also been preserved by other family members, such as his cousins Badar Miandad and Sher Miandad Khan. Initially, his father did not want Khan to follow the family's vocation. He had his heart set on Nusrat choosing a career path that commanded greater respect in society and wanted him to become a doctor or engineer because he felt qawwali artists had low social status. However, Khan showed such an aptitude for and interest in qawwali that his father finally relented.

=== Early career ===
In his youth, Nusrat joined his father's qawwali party as a tabla player whilst continuing to learn the intricacies of singing. When Ustad Munawar Ali Khan, son of legendary classical vocalist Ustad Bade Ghulam Ali Khan, visited Pakistan from India to perform, Nusrat accompanied him on tabla. Munawar Ali Khan's enthusiastic praise for Nusrat's playing helped convince his father to stop pressuring him to become a doctor.

Following the death of his father, Fateh Ali Khan, in 1964, Nusrat became the lead singer of the qawwali party in 1965 alongside his uncle, Mubarak Ali Khan. The party also included Mujahid Mubarak Ali Khan, the son of Mubarak and the cousin of Nusrat Fateh Ali Khan. After the death of Mubarak Ali Khan in 1971, the party became known as Nusrat Fateh Ali Khan, Mujahid Mubarak Ali Khan & Party. As Nusrat's prominence grew, the party eventually became recognised as Nusrat Fateh Ali Khan & Party. One of Khan's earliest public performances as leader of the family qawwali group was in March 1965, at a studio recording broadcast as part of an annual music festival organised by Radio Pakistan, known as Jashn-e-Baharan. The performance drew praise from legends such as Bade Ghulam Ali Khan, Umid Ali Khan, Roshan Ara Begum, and Amanat Ali Khan. Khan sang mainly in Urdu and Punjabi and occasionally in Persian, Braj Bhasha, and Hindi. Among Khan's first major hits in Pakistan was the punjabi qawwali Ni Main Jana Jogi De Naal which he composed and first performed live in 1971, with a studio version subsequently recorded in 1973. The lyrics to Ni Main Jana Jogi De Naal were written by Bulleh Shah, a 17th century Sufi poet. Another of Khan's early hits in Pakistan was the qawwali Haq Ali Ali which featured restrained use of his sargam improvisations.

=== 1980s ===
Throughout the 1980s, Nusrat Fateh Ali Khan delivered a plethora of acclaimed qawwalis that highlighted his extraordinary vocal prowess and innovative approach to the traditional Sufi devotional genre, helping to introduce it to wider international audiences. Among these works was Mere Rashke Qamar, a ghazal-qawwali with lyrics by Urdu poet Fana Bulandshahri and composed by Nusrat. Another notable hit was the introspective ghazal-qawwali Sochta Hoon Ke Woh Kitne Masoom Thay, originally written and composed by Nusrat, with live performances dating back to the late 1970s but officially recorded by Oriental Star Agencies Ltd in 1985. Nusrat also composed the popular Mast Nazron Se Allah Bachaye, written by Purnam Allahabadi, Nusrat and his brother Farrukh Fateh Ali Khan. A further highlight was the Punjabi qawwali Nit Khair Manga, primarily penned by the poet Badar Ali Ansari with additional lyrics written by Nusrat. It was composed by Nusrat, although some have mistakenly attributed the composition to Badar. Additionally, the revered manqabat Aastan Hai Yeh Kis Shah-e-Zeshan Ka, in praise of Abdul Qadir Jilani, was written by Pir Naseeruddin Naseer Gilani and composed by Nusrat. These works underscore Nusrat's pivotal role in elevating qawwali to global audiences during this transformative era.

Among Khan's most notable international appearances of the mid-to-late 1980s was his performance at the World of Music, Arts and Dance (WOMAD) festival in London in the summer of 1985. He performed in Paris in November 1985 and again in March 1988, where his concerts were recorded by Radio France and subsequently released on its Ocora label as part of the En concert à Paris series. In September 1987, at the invitation of the Japan Foundation, Khan made his first visit to Japan, performing at the 5th Asian Traditional Performing Art Festival in September 1987. In October 1989, he appeared at the Brooklyn Academy of Music's Next Wave Festival in New York, one of his earliest major performances in the United States.

In 1988, Khan collaborated with Peter Gabriel on the soundtrack to Martin Scorsese's film The Last Temptation of Christ. The collaboration formed part of Gabriel’s broader engagement with international musicians and preceded Khan’s signing to Real World Records in 1989. Through this label, Khan reached a wider international audience, particularly through albums such as Mustt Mustt (1990).

In 1989, commissioned by Oriental Star Agencies Ltd in Birmingham, UK, Khan collaborated at Zella Recording Studios with composer Andrew Kristy and producer Johnny Haynes on a series of 'fusion' tracks that propelled Nusrat Fateh Ali Khan and Party into the Channel 4 Christmas Special of "Big World Café." While in the UK in 1989, Khan and his party performed Sikh devotional music at a Sikh Gurdwara in Slough, continuing a tradition of Muslims performing hymns at Sikh temples.

=== 1990s ===
Following this, in 1990, the BBC devoted a programme of its series Network East to this collaboration, and Big World Café invited Khan, Andrew Kristy, and violinist Nigel Kennedy to perform Allah Hoo live on the show. A UK tour performing these new fusion tracks happened in 1990.

In the 1992 -1993 academic year, Khan was a visiting artist in the Ethnomusicology department at the University of Washington, Seattle, Washington, United States.

Khan released five albums of traditional qawwali through Real World, along with the more experimental albums Mustt Mustt (1990), Night Song (1996), and the posthumous remix album Star Rise (1997). Notable qawwalis among Khan’s 1990s hits included Man Atkeya Beparwah De Naal (lyrics by Shah Hussain, composed by Khan), Jani Door Gaye (lyrics by Anwar Hussain Jogi, composed by Khan), and Tum Ek Gorakh Dhanda Ho (lyrics by Naz Khialvi, composed by Khan).

Khan's experimental work for Real World, which featured his collaborations with the Canadian guitarist Michael Brook, led to several further collaborations with other Western composers and rock musicians. One of these collaborations occurred in 1995, when Khan teamed up with Pearl Jam's lead singer Eddie Vedder on two songs for the soundtrack to Dead Man Walking. Khan also provided vocals for The Prayer Cycle, which was put together by Jonathan Elias, but died before the tracks could be completed. Alanis Morissette was brought in to sing alongside his unfinished vocals. In 2002, Gabriel included Khan's vocals on the track "Signal to Noise" on his album Up.

Khan was the main performer at Imran Khan's charity appeal concert at the InterContinental London Park Lane Hotel on December 3, 1992 to raise funds for Shaukat Khanum Memorial Cancer Hospital and Research Centre, a cancer hospital built in Imran's mother's name which provides free services. The audience included Peter Gabriel, Elizabeth Hurley, Mick Jagger, and Amitabh Bachchan.

Khan's album Intoxicated Spirit was nominated for a Grammy Award for Best Traditional Folk Album in 1997. That same year, his album Night Song was also nominated for a Grammy Award for Best World Music Album.

Khan recorded the duet "Gurus of Peace" with A. R. Rahman, which was composed by Rahman and included on Rahman's 1997 album Vande Mataram, released to commemorate the 50th anniversary of India's independence. The recording was among Khan's final released works, as he died four days after the release of Vande Mataram. Rahman's song "Tere Bina" for the 2007 film Guru was dedicated to Khan and inspired by Khan's song "Sajna Tere Bina."

Khan contributed songs to, and performed in, several Pakistani films. Shortly before his death, he composed music for three Bollywood films, which include the film Aur Pyaar Ho Gaya, in which he also sang "Koi Jaane Koi Na Jaane" on-screen with the lead pair, and "Zindagi Jhoom Kar." He also composed music for Kartoos, where he sang for "Ishq Da Rutba" and "Bahaa Na Aansoo" alongside Udit Narayan. He died shortly before the movie's release. His final music composition for Bollywood was for the movie Kachche Dhaage, where he sang "Iss Shaan-E-Karam Ka Kya Kehna." The movie was released in 1999, two years after his death. Asha Bhosle and Lata Mangeshkar performed the songs he composed in his brief stint in Bollywood. He also sang "Saya Bhi Saath Jab Chhod Jaye" for Sunny Deol's movie Dillagi. The song was released in 1999, two years after Khan's death. He also sang "Dulhe Ka Sehra" from the Bollywood movie Dhadkan, which was released in 2000.

== Death ==
Khan had been seriously ill for several months, according to a spokesperson at his U.S. label, American Recordings. After traveling to London for treatment for liver and kidney problems, he was rushed from the airport to the Cromwell Hospital, where he died of a sudden cardiac arrest on 16 August 1997, aged 48. His body was repatriated to Faisalabad, and his funeral was a public affair. His widow, Naheed Nusrat, then moved to Canada, where she died on 13 September 2013 in Mississauga, Ontario.

Khan's musical legacy is now carried forward by his nephews, Rahat Fateh Ali Khan and Rizwan-Muazzam.

== Awards and titles ==
Khan is widely considered to be the most important qawwal in history. In 1987, he received the President of Pakistan's Award for Pride of Performance for his contribution to Pakistani music. In 1995, he received the UNESCO Music Prize. In 1996 he was awarded Grand Prix des Amériques at Montreal World Film Festival for exceptional contribution to the art of cinema. In the same year, Khan received the Arts and Culture Prize of the Fukuoka Asian Culture Prizes. In Japan, he was also remembered as the Budai or "Singing Buddha."

In 1997, the Hafiz Ali Khan Award was conferred upon him in Gwalior by the Haafiz Ali Khan Memorial Trust. This distinction formally recognized his foundational training and mastery in Hindustani classical music alongside the foremost vocalists and instrumentalists of the Shastriya Sangeet tradition. In the same year he was nominated for two Grammy Awards, for Best Traditional Folk Album and Best World Music Album. In 1998, he was awarded PTV Life Time Achievement Award. As of 2001, he held the Guinness World Record for the "Most Qawwali Recordings", having recorded over 125 qawwali albums before his death. In 2005, Khan posthumously received the "Legends" award at the UK Asian Music Awards. Time magazine's issue of 6 November 2006, "60 Years of Asian Heroes", lists him as one of the top 12 artists and thinkers in the last 60 years. He also appeared on NPR's 50 great voices list in 2010. In August 2010 he was included in CNN's list of the twenty most iconic musicians from the past fifty years. In 2008, Khan was listed in 14th position in UGO's list of the best singers of all time.

Many honorary titles were bestowed upon Khan during his 25-year music career. He was given the title of Ustad (the master) after performing classical music at a function in Lahore on the anniversary of his father's death.

Khan was listed at position 91 on Rolling Stone's 200 Best Singers Of All Time list, which was published on 1 January 2023.

He was called the 'Singing Buddha' in Tokyo, 'The Voice of Paradise' in Los Angeles, 'Quintessence of the Human Voice' in Tunis, 'The Spirit of Islam' in London, 'Pavarotti of the East' in Paris, 'Emperor of Qawwali' (Shahenshah – e – Qawwali) in Lahore.

== Tributes, legacy and influence ==
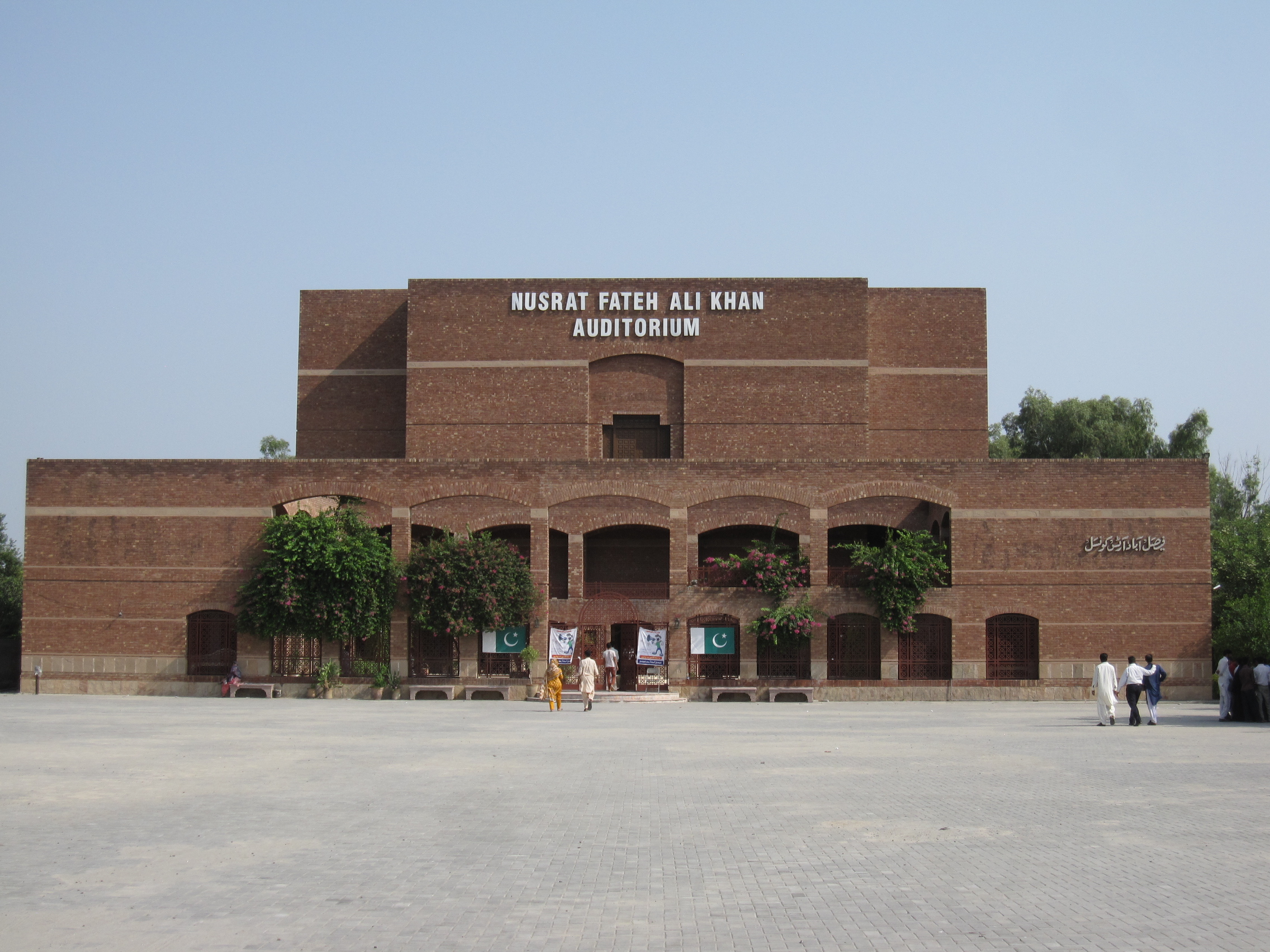
Faisalabad Arts Council's auditorium named after Khan

Khan is often credited as one of the progenitors of "world music." Widely acclaimed for his spiritual charisma and distinctive exuberance, he was one of the first and most important artists to popularize qawwali, then considered an "arcane religious tradition", to Western audiences. His powerful vocal presentations, which could last up to 10 hours, brought forth a craze for his music all over Europe. Alexandra A. Seno of Asiaweek wrote:

Nusrat Fateh Ali Khan's voice was otherworldly. For 25 years, his mystical songs transfixed millions. It was not long enough ... He performed qawwali, which means wise or philosophical utterance, as nobody else of his generation did. His vocal range, talent for improvisation and sheer intensity were unsurpassed.

Jeff Buckley cited Khan as a major influence, saying of him "He's my Elvis", and performing the first few minutes of Khan's "Yeh Jo Halka Halka Suroor Hai" (including vocals) at live concerts. Many other artists have also cited Khan as an influence, such as Nadia Ali, Zayn Malik, Malay, Peter Gabriel, A. R. Rahman, Sheila Chandra, Alim Qasimov, Eddie Vedder, and Joan Osborne, among others. His music was also appreciated by singers such as Mick Jagger, socialites such as Parmeshwar Godrej, actors such as Amitabh Bachchan, Trudie Styler, Sean Penn, Susan Sarandon, and Tim Robbins, and authors such as Sam Harris, who cited Khan as one of his favourite musicians.

Music scholars have examined Khan's international career as part of the transformation of qawwali from a devotional practice associated with Sufi contexts into a form increasingly presented to international concert audiences. His music's movement between South Asian and Western settings also involved changes in how its religious and musical meanings were interpreted by different audiences.

Paul Williams picked a concert performance by Khan for inclusion in his 2000 book The 20th Century's Greatest Hits: a 'top-40' list, in which he devotes a chapter each to what he considers the top 40 artistic achievements of the 20th century in any field (including art, movies, music, fiction, non-fiction, science-fiction). The Derek Trucks Band covers Khan's songs on two of their studio albums. Their 2002 album Joyful Noise includes a cover of "Maki Madni", which features a guest performance by Rahat Fateh Ali Khan, Khan's nephew. 2005's Songlines includes a medley of two of Khan's songs, "Sahib Teri Bandi" and "Maki Madni." This medley first appeared on the band's live album Live at Georgia Theatre (2004).

In 2004, a tribute band called Brooklyn Qawwali Party (formerly Brook's Qawwali Party) was formed in New York City by percussionist Brook Martinez to perform the music of Khan. The 13-piece group still performs mostly instrumental jazz versions of Khan's qawwalis, using the instruments conventionally associated with jazz rather than those associated with qawwali.

In 2007, electronic music producer and performer Gaudi, after being granted access to back catalogue recordings from Rehmat Gramophone House (Khan's former label in Pakistan), released an album of entirely new songs composed around existing vocals. The album, Dub Qawwali, was released by Six Degrees Records. It reached no. 2 in the iTunes US Chart, no. 4 in the UK and was the no. 1 seller in Amazon.com's Electronic Music section for a period. It also earned Gaudi a nomination for the BBC's World Music Awards 2008.

On 13 October 2015, Google celebrated Khan's 67th birthday with a doodle on its homepage in six countries, including India, Pakistan, Japan, Sweden, Ghana, and Kenya, calling him the person "who opened the world's ears to the rich, hypnotic sounds of the Sufis." "Thanks to his legendary voice, Khan helped bring 'world music' to the world," said Google.

In February 2016, a rough mix of a song recorded by Red Hot Chili Peppers in 1998 called "Circle of the Noose" was leaked to the internet. Guitarist Dave Navarro described the song saying, "It's pop in the sense of verse, chorus, verse, chorus, bridge, hook. I really love it and we use a loop of Nusrat Fateh Ali Khan. It's really nice. The best way I can describe it is it's like pepped- up '60s folk with '90s ideals, but I would hate to label it as folk because it's not, it moves."

The 2018 book The Displaced Children of Displaced Children (Eyewear Publishing) by Pakistani American poet Faisal Mohyuddin includes the poem "Faisalabad", a tribute to Khan and to the city of Khan's birth. "Faisalabad" includes a number or references to Khan, including the excerpt, "There are no better cures for homesickness / than Nusrat's qawwalis, / except when you're a mother / and you find comfort in the unfolding / hours of a child's existence." The poem was first published by Narrative Magazine in Spring 2017.

Nusrat Fateh Ali Khan’s family heritage belonged to the Delhi Gharana (also known as the Qawwal Bachchon ka Gharana) that was founded by Amir Khusrau in the 13th century. Traditionally most musical gharanas including the Delhi Gharana did not encourage women to pursue singing as a profession. However, Nusrat took a progressive stance against these traditions and openly taught several female students, including the well-known Pakistani singer Humaira Arshad. Furthermore, his daughter, Nida Nusrat Fateh Ali Khan, has stated that she learned music directly from her father, and that he was supportive of her if she ever wanted to take up singing professionally, standing in contrast to broader societal restrictions at the time.

=== Popular culture ===
"Tere Bin Nahin Lagda"
From Sorrows Vol. 69 (1996). The song inspired several remixed/cover versions, and featured in several films.

One of Khan's famous qawwali songs, "Tere Bin Nahin Lagda" ("I am restless without you"), appeared on two of his 1996 albums, Sorrows Vol. 69 and Sangam (as "Tere Bin Nahin Lagda Dil"), the latter a collaborative album with Indian lyricist Javed Akhtar; Sangam sold over 1 million copies in India. Lata Mangeshkar recorded a cover version called "Tere Bin Nahin Jeena" for Kachche Dhaage, starring Ajay Devgn, Saif Ali Khan and Manisha Koirala. Composed by Nusrat Fateh Ali Khan, the Kachche Dhaage soundtrack album sold 3 million units in India. British-Indian producer Bally Sagoo released a remix of "Tere Bin Nahin Lagda", which was later featured in the 2002 British film Bend It Like Beckham, starring Parminder Nagra and Keira Knightley. A cover version called "Tere Bin" was recorded by Rahat Fateh Ali Khan with Asees Kaur for the 2018 Bollywood film Simmba, starring Ranveer Singh and Sara Ali Khan. Nusrat Fateh Ali Khan also composed "Mann Ki Lagan", which was recorded by Rahat Fateh Ali Khan for an unreleased album and later featured in the 2003 Bollywood film Paap, marking Rahat's playback singing debut in Indian cinema.

Nusrat Fateh Ali Khan's music had a big impact on Bollywood music, inspiring numerous Indian musicians working in Bollywood since the late 1980s. For example, he inspired Meeza, A. R. Rahman and Javed Akhtar, both of whom he collaborated with. However, there were many hit filmi songs from other Indian music directors that plagiarised Khan's music. For example, Viju Shah's hit song "Tu Cheez Badi Hai Mast Mast" in Mohra (1994) was plagiarised from Khan's popular qawwali song "Dam Mast Qalandar."

Despite the significant number of hit Bollywood songs plagiarised from his music, he was reportedly tolerant towards the plagiarism. In one interview, he jokingly gave "Best Copy" awards to Viju Shah and Anu Malik. In his defense, Malik claimed that he loved Khan's music and was actually showing admiration by using his tunes. However, Khan was reportedly aggrieved when Malik turned his spiritual "Allah Hoo, Allah Hoo" into "I Love You, I Love You" in Auzaar. Khan said "he has taken my devotional song Allahu and converted it into I love you. He should at least respect my religious songs."

His music also appears on soundtracks for Hollywood films such as The Last Temptation of Christ (1988), Natural Born Killers (1994), and Dead Man Walking (1995). His songs Dil Pe Zakham Khate Hain and Man Atkeya Beparwah De Naal have appeared on the soundtrack of the 2026 Hindi feature film Dhurandhar: The Revenge. Also, the 2026 feature film Mirzapur (film) featured a recreation of the song "Sanson Ki Mala Pe".

== Discography ==
| Year | Title | Label |
|---|---|---|
| 1988 | In Concert in Paris, Vol 1 | Ocora |
| 1988 | Shahen-Shah | Real World/CEMA |
| 1990 | Mustt Mustt (Collaboration with Michael Brook) | Real World/CEMA |
| 1991 | Magic Touch | OSA |
| 1991 | Shahbaaz | RealWorld/CEMA |
| 1991 | The Day, the Night, the Dawn, the Dusk | Shanachie Records |
| 1992 | Devotional Songs | Real World |
| 1992 | Love Songs | EMI |
| 1992 | Mighty Khan Vol 23 – Allah Hoo, Mast Nazron Se, Jana Jogi De Naal (collaboration with Andrew Kristy, Johnny Haynes) | OSA |
| 1993 | Ilham | Audiorec |
| 1993 | Traditional Sufi Qawwalis: Live in London, Vol. 2 | Navras Records |
| 1994 | Pakistan: Vocal Art of the Sufis, Vol 2 – Qawwali | JVC |
| 1994 | Nusrat Fateh Ali Khan & Party | Real World |
| 1994 | The Last Prophet | Real World |
| 1994 | Traditional Sufi Qawwalis: Live in London, Vol. 4 | Navras Records |
| 1995 | Revelation | Interra/Intersound |
| 1995 | Back to Qawwali | Long Distance |
| 1996 | In Concert in Paris, Vol. 3–5 | Ocora |
| 1996 | Qawwali: The Art of the Sufis | JVC |
| 1996 | Night Song | Real World |
| 1996 | Dead Man Walking: The Score | Columbia/Sony |
| 1996 | Intoxicated Spirit | Shanachie Records |
| 1996 | Mega Star | Interra |
| 1996 | Bandit Queen | Milan Records |
| 1996 | The Prophet Speaks | M.I.L. Multimedia |
| 1996 | Sangam | EMI |
| 1997 | Live in India | RPG |
| 1997 | Akhian | M.I.L. Multimedia |
| 1997 | Live in New York City | M.I.L. Multimedia |
| 1997 | Farewell Song: Alwadah | M.I.L. Multimedia. |
| 1997 | In Concert in Paris, Vol 2 | Ocora |
| 1997 | Oriente/Occidente: Gregorian Chant & Qawwali Music | Materiali Sonori |
| 1998 | Allah & The Prophet | Ex Works |
| 1998 | Star Rise: Remixes | EMI |
| 1998 | Live at Royal Albert Hall | M.I.L. Multimedia |
| 1998 | Missives from Allah | BCD |
| 1998 | Imprint: In Concert (Selections from the concert of 23 January 1993 at Meany Hall, University of Washington in Seattle, during Khan's residency at their ethnomusicology program.) | Hi Horse Records |
| 1999 | Peace | Omni Parc |
| 1999 | Live at Islamabad, Vol 1–2 | M.I.L. Multimedia |
| 1999 | Passion | NYC Music |
| 1999 | Visions of Allah | Ex Works |
| 1999 | Swan Song | Narada Productions |
| 2000 | Jewel | MoviePlay |
| 2000 | Live in London, Vol 3 | Navras Records |
| 2001 | Opus | Vanstory |
| 2001 | The Final Studio Recordings | Legacy/Sony |
| 2001 | Pukaar: The Echo | Navras Records |
| 2001 | The Final Moment | Birdman Records |
| 2002 | Body and Soul | Real World/CEMA |
| 2002 | Sufi Qawwalis | Arc Music |
| 2004 | Allah Hoo | Saregama |
| 2004 | Aur Pyar Ho Gaya | Saregama. |
| 2004 | Ishq Da Rutba | Saregama |
| 2004 | Kartoos | Saregama |
| 2004 | Main Aur Meri Awargi | Saregama |
| 2004 | Ye Jo Halka | Saregama |
| 2005 | Nami Danam | JVC |
| 2006 | Pukaar: The Echo | Navras Records |
| 2024 | Chain of Light | Real World |

=== Sales ===
The following are known sales of records with songs credited to Nusrat Fateh Ali Khan, either as a vocalist, composer, or special thanks.

Credited
| Year | Title | Sales | Ref | Region(s) |
|---|---|---|---|---|
| 1996 | Sangam | 1,000,000 | | India |
| 1997 | Only One | 6,000,000 | | Worldwide |
| 1997 | Vande Mataram | 2,000,000 | | Worldwide |
| 1997 | Aur Pyaar Ho Gaya | 1,500,000 | | India |
| 1997 | "Afreen Afreen" | 500,000 | | India |
| 1999 | Kachche Dhaage | 3,000,000 | | India |
| 2000 | Dhadkan | 4,500,000 | | India |
| 2007 | Guru | 1,150,000 | | India |
| | Total known sales | 19,650,000 | | Worldwide |

The following are known Indian sales of Bollywood soundtrack albums featuring copied versions of songs originally composed by Nusrat Fateh Ali Khan, without crediting him.

Uncredited
| Year | Title | Sales | Ref |
|---|---|---|---|
| 1994 | Mohra | 8,000,000 | |
| 1995 | Yaraana | 2,000,000 | |
| 1996 | Raja Hindustani | 11,000,000 | |
| 1996 | Auzaar | 2,200,000 | |
| 1997 | Judaai | 2,000,000 | |
| 1997 | Koyla | 1,800,000 | |
| | Total known sales | 27,000,000 | |

== See also ==
- Filmi qawwali
- List of Pakistani musicians
- List of Pakistani qawwali singers
