= Infinite Guitar =

String instrument

String instrument
- Other names: Electric guitar
- Classification: String instrument (fingered or picked or strummed)

The Infinite Guitar is a modified electric guitar created by Michael Brook, as a way of allowing a note to be held with infinite sustain. It consists of an electronic circuit that takes the signal from a standard guitar pickup, amplifies it, and feeds it back into a separate pickup coil. When set up and used correctly, the result is a continuous sustained note that can be used as is, or treated to create new sounds or emulate traditional instruments.

In addition to his own instrument, based on a Tokai Stratocaster copy, Brook produced two other Infinite Guitars. One belongs to Daniel Lanois, and the other belongs to the Edge of U2, who used it to record "With or Without You" from 1987's The Joshua Tree.

The principle has been the subject of patent litigation in the past, and is (or was) available commercially in several forms, including the Kramer Floyd Rose Sustainer, the Sustainiac, the Fernandes Sustainer, the Guitar Resonator and the Moog Guitar.

Additionally, it has been suggested that Brook was inspired by the Holland Infinite Sustain Guitar introduced prior to his design. In 1978, guitarist Randy Roos and Steve Holland modified an SG guitar with a stainless steel fingerboard and infinite sustain device. The sustain device was patented by Steve Holland. The guitar can be heard on Randy Roos' recording "Mistral" which features Roos, Tony Levin and Mike Stern, among others. Similarly, musician and producer Jim O'Rourke has suggested that the concept did not originate with Brook, who simply refined previous similar designs by others.

== See also ==
- EBow
- The Gizmo
