= Rashid Khan (musician) =

Indian classical musician (1968–2024)

Ustad Rashid Khan
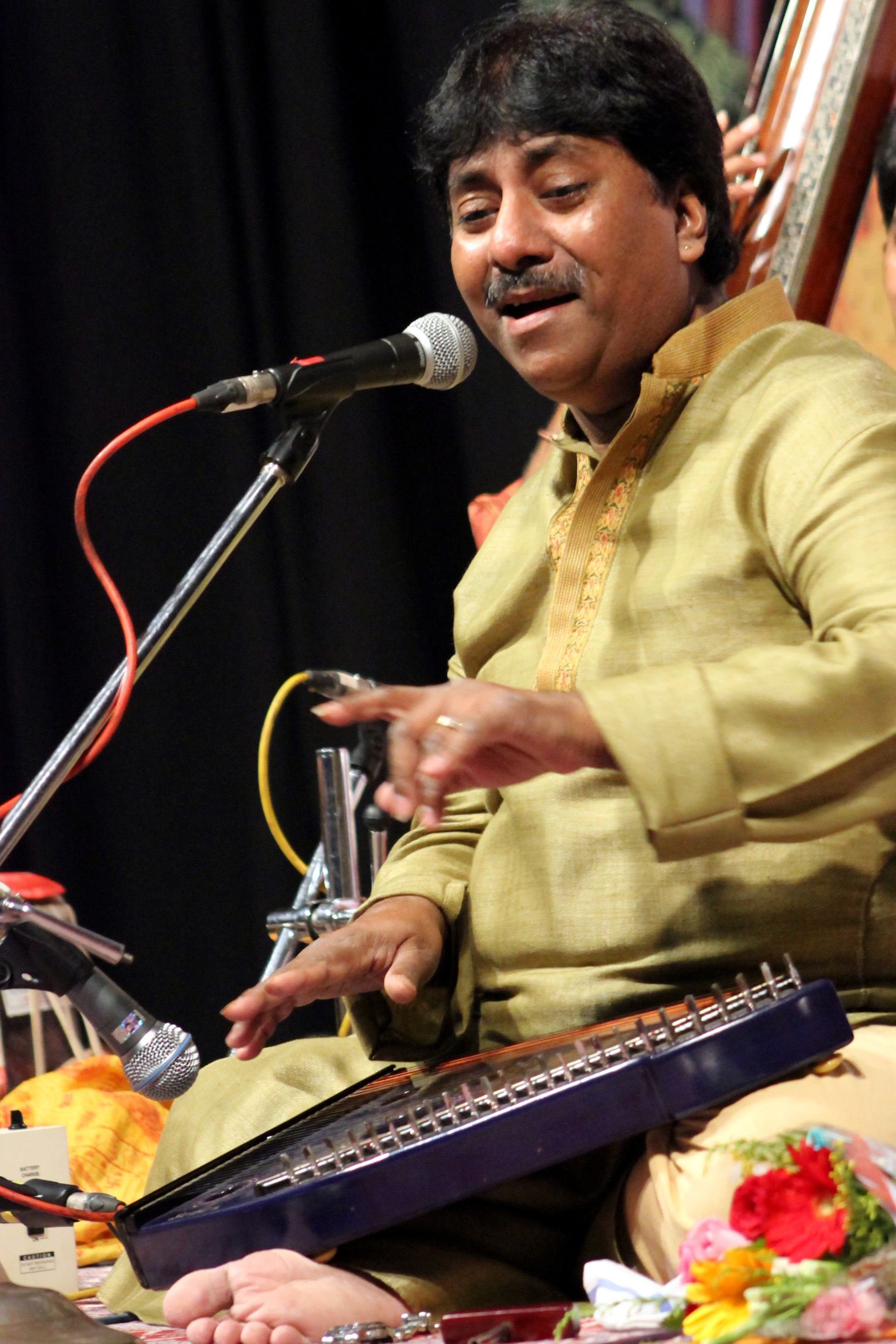
- Khan performing at Bharat Bhavan in 2015
- Born: 1 July 1968; Sahaswan, Uttar Pradesh, India
- Died: 9 January 2024 (aged 55); Kolkata, West Bengal, India
- Occupation: Classical vocalist
- Years active: 1977–2024
- Awards: Padma Bhushan (2022); Padma Shri (2006)
- Musical career
- Genre: Hindustani classical music

Ustad Rashid Khan (1 July 1968 – 9 January 2024) was an Indian classical musician in the Hindustani tradition. He belonged to the Rampur-Sahaswan gharana and was the great-grandson of the gharana's founder Inayat Hussain Khan.

He was awarded the Padma Shri, as well as the Sangeet Natak Akademi Award in 2006. He was awarded the Padma Bhushan, India's third highest civilian award, in 2022 by the Indian Government in the field of Art.

== Early life ==
Rashid Khan was born in Sahaswan, Badayun, Uttar Pradesh on 1 July 1968. He received his initial training from his maternal grand-uncle, Ustad Nisar Hussain Khan. He was also a nephew of Ustad Ghulam Mustafa Khan.

As a child he had little interest in music. His uncle Ghulam Mustafa Khan was among the first to note his musical talents, and for some time trained him in Mumbai. However, he received his main training from Nisar Hussain Khan, initially at his house in Badayun. A strict disciplinarian, Nisar Hussain Khan would insist on voice training (Swar Sadhana) from four in the morning, and make Rashid practise one note of the scale for hours on end.

== Career ==
Rashid Khan gave his first concert at age eleven, and the following year, in 1978, he performed at an ITC concert in Delhi. In April 1980, when Nisar Hussain Khan moved to the ITC Sangeet Research Academy (SRA), Calcutta, Rashid Khan also joined the academy at the age of 14. By 1994, he was acknowledged as a musician (a formal process) at the academy. He later became one of the 'scholar musicians' there and was called a guru and a part of the teaching faculty at the Academy from 1994 to 1998.

== Musical style ==
The Rampur-Sahaswan gayaki (style of singing) is closely related to the Gwalior gharana, which features medium-slow tempos, a full-throated voice and intricate rhythmic play. Rashid Khan included the slow elaboration in his vilambit khayals in the manner of his maternal grand-uncle and also developed exceptional expertise in the use of sargams and sargam taankari (play on the scale). He was influenced by the style of Amir Khan and Bhimsen Joshi but chose not to imitate them and created his own unique style of singing.

He was also a master of the tarana like his guru but sang them in his own manner, preferring the khayal style rather than the instrumental stroke-based style for which Nisar Hussain was famous. There was no imitation of instrumental tone.

His renderings stood out for the emotional overtones in his melodic elaboration. He said: "The emotional content may be in the alaap, sometimes while singing the bandish, or while giving expression to the meaning of the lyrics." This brought a touch of modernity to his style, as compared to the older maestros, who tended to place greater emphasis on impressive technique and skilful execution of difficult passages.

Rashid Khan also experimented with fusing pure Hindustani music with lighter musical genres, e.g. in the Sufi fusion recording Naina Piya Se (songs of Amir Khusro), or in experimental concerts with western instrumentalist Louis Banks. He also performed jugalbandis, along with sitarist Shahid Parvez and others.

== Illness and death ==
Rashid Khan died on 9 January 2024, at a private hospital in Kolkata. He had been battling cancer for a long time. After being diagnosed with prostate cancer, Khan sought medical attention at the Tata Memorial Cancer Hospital. He later chose to pursue exclusive treatment in Kolkata. Khan initially showed positive responses to the treatment.

But his condition got worse on 23 December 2023, and he was admitted to the hospital, where he was placed on a ventilator for oxygen support and died at the age of 55.

His obituary on BBC News website says: "But he was, undisputedly, the defining artist of his generation, someone who enjoyed a kind of commercial success and public adulation that was rare for a classical singer of his era. He commanded the biggest fee among his contemporaries and performed in packed auditoriums in his busiest years, he was doing 20 concerts a month. His untimely death has robbed India of one of its finest and most popular vocalists".

== Film discography ==
Year	Song	Film	Music director	
2023	"Chanda Se Chhup ke"	Goldfish	Tapas Relia	
2022	"Marwa"	Me Vasantrao	Rahul Deshpande	
2019	"Barsat Sawan"	Mitin Mashi (Bengali Film)	Pandit Bikram Ghosh	
2018	"Bol Ke Lab Azad Hain"	Manto	Sneha Khanwalkar	
	"Ae Ri Mai Re"	Dassehra (2018 film)	Vijay Verma	
2017	"Sakhi Ri"	Vodka Diaries	Sandesh Shandilya	
2017	2015	"Bhara Badara"	Kadambari	Bickram Ghosh
2017	2013	"Jheeni Re Jheeni"	Issaq	Sachin–Jigar
2017	2012	"Sajna"	Bapi Bari Ja (Bengali)	Jeet Ganguly
"Aiyo Piyaji"	2012	Chakravyuh	Shantanu Moitra	
2011	"Poore se zara sa"	Mausam	Pritam Chakraborty	
2010	"Allah Hi Raheem"	My Name is Khan	Shankar Ehsaan Loy	
2010	"Megh Jome Ache"	Tara (Bengali)	Tapan Sinha	
2009	"Bhor Bhayo"	Morning Walk	Jeet Ganguly	
2009	"Manwa"	Morning Walk	Jeet Ganguly	
2007	"Aaoge Jab Tum Saajna"	Jab We Met	Sandesh Shandilya	
2004	"Kahe Ujadi Mori Neend"	Kisna: The Warrior Poet	Ismail Darbar	
2004	"Tore Bina Mohe Chain Nahi"	Kisna: The Warrior Poet	Ismail Darbar	

== Non-film discography ==
- Yaar Zaahir (2023)
- Classical Wonders of India (2015)
- Krishna - Ustad Rashid Khan (2013)
- Rashid Again (2013)
- Baithaki Rabi - Ustad Rashid Khan (2012)
- Poore Se Zara Sa Kam Hai – Mausam
- Nirgun (2010)
- Kabir (2009)
- Shabad Kirtan Gurbani - Sawan Aaya Hey Sakhi from album (Guru Manyo Granth)(2008)
- Shabad Kirtan Gurbani - Holi Kini Sant Sev from album (Guru Manyo Granth)(2008)
- Hey Bhagwan - Ustad Rashid Khan
- Master Pieces Ustad Rashid Khan (2006)
- Yearning (2006)
- Reflection (2006)
- Masterworks From the NCPA Archives: Rashid Khan
- The Song of Shiva
- Morning Mantra (2003)
- Morning Mantra (2003)
- Selection - Raga - Megh and Hansadhwani (2002)
- Voice of India (2002)
- Yatra – A Journey of Rabindrasangeet & Hindustani Classical Bandish, with Nachiketa Chakraborty
- Naina Piya Se
- Live in Concert: Moreton Centre (2000)
- A Maestro in the Making (2000)
- The Genius of Rashid Khan (2000)
- The Song of Shiva (2000)
- In London (2000)
- Classical Vocal: Ustad Rashid Khan (Live At Savai Gandharva Festival, Pune) (1999)
- Saajan More Ghar Aao (Live) (1998)
- Selection - Kaushi Kanada - Charukeshi - Barwan (1996)
- Khyal (1996)
- Shyam Kalyan - Ustad Rashid Khan (1996)
- Rashid Khan Live In Concert (1995)
- Rashid Khan - Ustad Rashid Khan (1995)
- A Tribute to a Living Legend (1995)
- Raga Yaman / Raga Kirwani (1994)
- Rashid Khan Live In Concert (1993)
- Raga Bageshri / Desh (1991)

== Awards ==
- Padma Shri (2006)
- Banga Bhushan in 2012
- Sangeet Natak Akademi Award (2006)
- Global Indian Music Academy Awards (GIMA) (2010)
- Maha Sangeet Samman Award (2012)
- Mirchi Music Awards (2013)
- Padma Bhushan (2022)
- Lokmat Sur Jyotsna National Music legends Award.
