= Shanno Khurana =

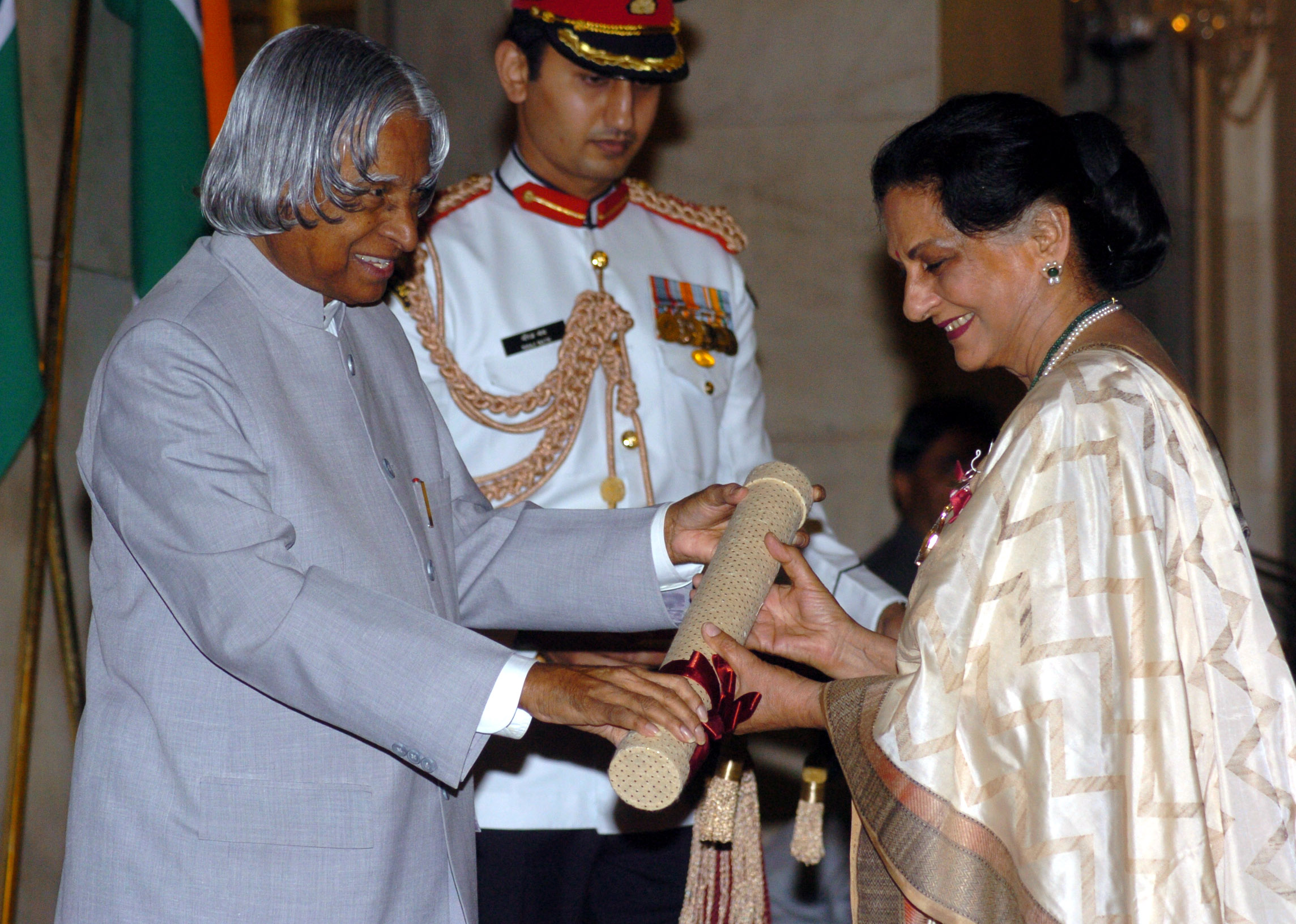
- President Kalam presenting Padma Bhushan to Khurana in 2006

Background information
- Born: 23 December 1927 (age 98); Jodhpur, Rajasthan
- Education: Bhatkhande Sanskriti Vishwavidyalaya
- Genres: Hindustani classical
- Occupations: singer, composer
- Years active: (1940s –present)

Shanno Khurana (born 23 December 1927) is an Indian classical vocalist and composer, from the Rampur-Sahaswan gharana of Hindustani classical music. A disciple of the doyen of the gharana, Ustad Mushtaq Hussain Khan (d. 1964), she is known for performing rare bandish and raag, though her singing style includes genres like khayal, tarana, thumri, dadra, tappa, to chaiti and bhajan. Born and brought up in Jodhpur, she started singing on All India Radio in 1945 in Lahore, later shifted to Delhi, where she continued her singing on All India Radio, Delhi and in concerts and music festivals. She also pursued music education, finally earning her M.Phil. and PhD in music from the Kairagarh University, and has undertakes extensive research on folk music of Rajasthan. She is currently 98 years old.

She was awarded the Padma Shri in 1991, followed by the Padma Bhushan in 2006, the third highest civilian honour given by Government of India. In 2002, she was conferred the Sangeet Natak Akademi Fellowship, the highest honour in the performing arts conferred by the Sangeet Natak Akademi, India's National Academy for Music, Dance and Drama. She has said in an interview that she wishes to live till 100 and become a centenarian.

== Early life and training ==
Khurana was born and brought up in a Punjabi family in Jodhpur, Rajasthan. Her family was mostly non-musicians, consisting of doctors, engineers, and people working in foreign services. But her interest in music grew in her early years, when she saw her brother learning from musicologist and vocalist Pandit Raghunath Rao Musalgaonkar, a disciple and nephew of Raja Bhaiya Poonchwale of Gwalior gharana. Her conservative family didn't allow girls to learn music, but when her father saw her listening intently to classical music on radio, he allowed her to start her musical training at age 12 under Musalgaonkar.

== Career ==
Khurana was married at age 18, to a dentist with the Indian Air Force and shifted to Lahore, though she continued singing at All India Radio (AIR), Lahore, starting in 1945. After partition of India, her family had to shift to Delhi, where her husband left Air Force and started his private practice. However, at the insistence of her husband, she started her riyaz once again, despite having two young children and an ailing mother-in-law. She practised with tabla maestro Pandit Chatur Lal, which continued for the following 16 years, and soon singing on radio as well. Meanwhile, Nirmala Joshi, who was secretary of the Sangeet Natak Akademi at the time, invited her to teach classical music at her music school, Sangeet Bharati at Mandi House in Delhi.

Subsequently, she was introduced to her next teacher via her husband, when musicologist and chief producer at AIR, Delhi, Thakur Jaidev Singh happened to be his patient. Singh helped her get confidence as she started touring to Turkey, Iran, Greece and other areas as a part of cultural delegations sponsored by Government of India. Besides performing at notable music festival across India through the 1960s and '70s, including Tansen Sammelan, Gwalior, Harvallabh Festival, Jalandhar, and Swami Haridas Sangeet Sammelan, Mumbai. He taught her the purab-ang Thumri, and later insisted her on joining the Indira Kala Sangeet University at Khairagarh, Madhya Pradesh, where eminent musicologist and teacher S. N. Ratanjankar who has remained principal of Bhatkhande Music Institute, was the Vice-Chancellor at the time. Singh was her guide through her M.Phil. and PhD in music, wherein she undertook an extensive study-tour of Rajasthan, for her research on the folk music traditions of Rajasthan, tappa and folk songs. For the next three years, travelled back and forth from Delhi, but managed to complete her education. She went on to training under V. R. Athawale of Gwalior Gharana and S. N. Ratanjankar of Agra gharana, both of whom taught her rare ragas, further expanding her repertoire. Finally, at the request of Singh, she trained under the doyen of Rampur-Sasawan gharana, singer Ustad Mushtaq Hussain Khan, who was then teaching at the Bharatiya Kala Kendra in Delhi. However, Mushtaq Hussain first tested her skills for over five months, finally one day when she successfully sang Raag Nayaki-Kanada, he took her on formally as a student, via the ganda-bandh ceremony. After his untimely death in 1964, she continued her training under his son, the Ustad Ishtiaq Hussain Khan. This extensive and varied training helped her expand her musical repertoire to include rare raagas and bandish, besides khayal, tarana, thumri, dadra, chaiti and bhajan, besides tappas and jangra, a folk form of Rajasthan. Over the years, she has been involving in not just research and documentation of aprachalit ragas (uncommon ragas), but also promoting them through music festivals and lecdem series. Her organisation, Geetika, organises music festivals for women, and tala vadya kutcheri, an all-woman music festival, Bhairav se Sohni, held in 1983 and all-woman festival on aprachalit raags held in 1996.

Over the years she composed directed and sung five full-length musicals, experimenting both with classical music as well as folk music styles. Her operas include Heer Ranjha (1956) with director Sheila Bhatia, in which she also played the lead role, Sohni Mahiwal in Punjabi (1963), where in Ustad Mushtaq Hussain, son of her guru sang with her, "Jahan Ara" in Urdu (1970), Chitralekha (1973, Hindi), based on the story by Bhagwati Charan Verma and directed by B.V. Karanth has music composed on 80 classical ragas, and "Sundari", based on the novel by the same name written by Bhai Vir Singh in 1979. In 2006, her music album of genre of tappas, titled Sufi Raah was released by Parzor Foundation.

== Awards ==
Khurana was awarded the Padma Shri in 1991, followed by the Padma Bhushan in 2006, the fourth and the third highest civilian honour respectively given by Government of India. In 2002, she was conferred the Sangeet Natak Akademi Fellowship, the highest honour in the performing arts conferred by the Sangeet Natak Akademi, India's National Academy for Music, Dance and Drama and was later made a board member of the Sangeet Natak Akademi.

== Works ==
- Rajasthan Ka Loksangeet (Folk Music of Rajasthan), Siddhartha Publication. 1995.
- Forms and Variation in Rajasthani Folk Songs, Sangeet Natak: Journal of Sangeet Natak Akademi 20. 1969. pp. 74–85

== Bibliography ==
- Sakuntala Narasimhan (2006). The Splendour of Rampur-sahaswan Gharana; of Hindustani Music. Veenapani Centre for Arts.
- Kumar Pradas Mukherji (2006). The Lost World of Hindustani Music. Penguin Books India. ISBN 0143061992.
- Arvind Sharma; Katherine K. Young (1999). Feminism and World Religions. SUNY Press. ISBN 1438419678.
