= Nisar Hussain Khan =

Indian classical vocalist (1906–1993)

Ustad Nissar Hussain Khan
- Born: 1906
- Died: 16 July 1993 (aged 86–87)
- Occupations: Vocalist; court musician
- Years active: 1924–1990s
- Style: Hindustani classical; Rampur–Sahaswan gharana; khyal
- Relatives: Inayat Hussain Khan (father-in-law); Ghulam Mustafa Khan (cousin); Rashid Khan (grandnephew)
- Awards: Padma Bhushan; Sangeet Natak Akademi Award; Tansen

Ustad Nissar Hussain Khan (1906 – 16 July 1993) was an Indian classical vocalist of the Rampur–Sahaswan gharana. He was a disciple and son of Fida Hussain Khan and, after a long and illustrious career, was awarded the Padma Bhushan in 1971.

He was the court musician of Sayajirao Gaekwad III of Baroda and was featured extensively on All India Radio. He was a specialist in the tarana form. His most famous disciples are his cousin Ghulam Mustafa Khan and grandnewphew Rashid Khan.

== Career ==
Khan gave his first performance at age 11, which was considered phenomenal at that time. He then went on to receive a scholarship from the Maharaja of Baroda, who also appointed his father a court musician to further help train his young son. By age 18, he had gained much more confidence as a singer in Maharaja's court, and he too was appointed a court musician. He remained in that position for nearly three decades.

By the 1940s, Khan had become a well-known performer on the concert circuit of India as well as broadcasting on All India Radio.

== Vocal style ==
Khan inherited a vast repertoire of well-known and obscure melodies from his forebears. His rich, resonant voice was cultivated through decades of training. He embellished the modal form of the ragas with flashes of gamaks, bol-taans and sargams. As an exponent of the khyal style, he rendered taranas with distinction.

== Lineage ==
Khan's most famous disciple was his grandnephew Rashid Khan. He trained Rashid in the traditional master-apprentice manner, first at his own residence at Budaun, Uttar Pradesh, and subsequently at the ITC Sangeet Research Academy in Calcutta, where he spent the last years of his life.

Khan belonged to the Rampur–Sahaswan gharana, which has a revered lineage of classical vocalists, including Inayat Hussain Khan, Fida Hussain Khan and Mushtaq Hussain Khan.

== Awards ==
- Padma Bhushan by the Government of India in 1971
- Sangeet Natak Akademi Award in 1970
- Tansen award from the Government of Madhya Pradesh

== Partial discography ==
=== 78rpm recordings (His Master's Voice, c. 1938 onwards) ===
- N 15721: Todi, Allah jane; Jaunpuri, tarana
- N 15747: Kedar, kanha re nanda nandana; Bhairavi, tarana
- N 15776: Puriya dhanashri, payaliya jhankar; Desh, tarana
- N 15809: Multani, kangana mundariya; Miya malhar, tarana
- N 15834: Raga Bahar, kaliyan sanga karan; Bahar, koyalia kuk sunawe
- N 88215: Chayanat, jhanana jhanana; Malkauns, tarana
- N 88260: Basant, samana sunawe koyaliya; Pilu thumri, bake aika mori

=== EP/LP recordings: His Master's Voice, 1961 ===
- 7EPE 1202: Gaud Sarang, Bin deke tere; Puriya Dhanashri, tarana
- 7EPE 1236: Vrindabani Sarang, Achchhe Peer More; Pancham, Mohe Ataman Kaise
- 7EPE 1242: Alhaiya Bilawal, Sumiran Kar Man; Jhinjhoti, Tarana: Tana Ta Tana Dere
- ECLP 2260: Abhogi, Vil. jhaptal: Charan Dhar Ayeri; Tarana: tintal; Gowardhani Todi. Vil. ektal: Tu Ayore Ayo, Drut tintal: Kahe Karat Mose Batiyan

=== His Master's Voice, 1972 ===
- ECSD 2489: Lalit. Tintal: Yaarda; Bhatiyar. Tintal: tarana
- ECSD 2509: Basant. Phagwa Brih Dekhan; Jaijaiwanti. Tintal: tarana

=== Odeon Records, 1990 ===
- PMLP 3065: Raga Kalyaan Ka Prakar. With Hafeez Ahmed Khan & Sarfaraz Hussain Khan (vocal support), Shakur Khan (sarangi) and Prem Ballabh (tabla)
