= Koushik Bhattacharjee =

Indian classical vocalist and teacher

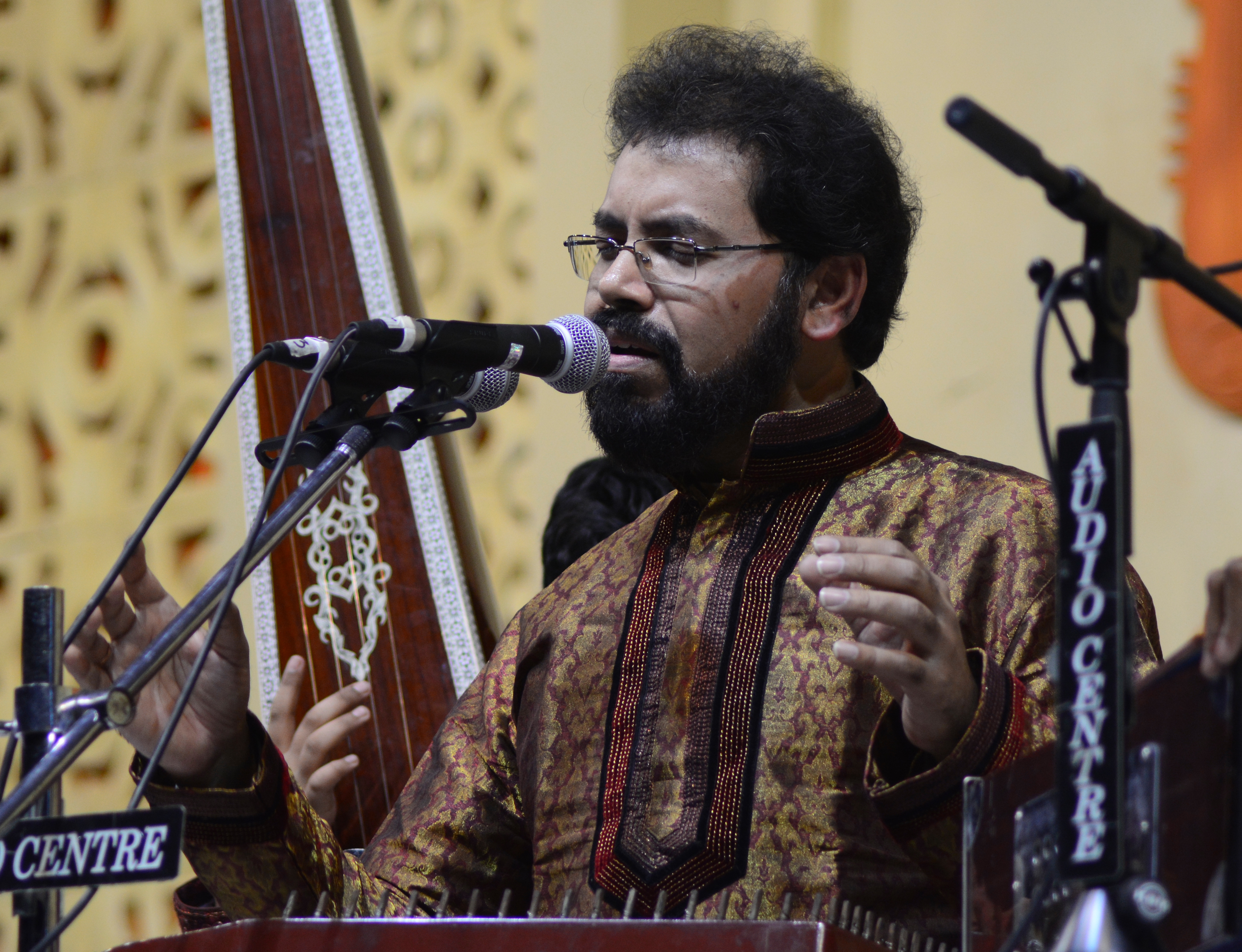
- Koushik in Doverlane Music Conference 2014

Background information
- Born: Koushik Bhattacharjee
- Origin: Howrah, WB, India
- Genres: Hindustani classical music
- Occupation: Singer
- Years active: 1994–present

Koushik Bhattacharjee (Bengali: কৌশিক ভট্টাচার্য) is an Indian classical vocalist and teacher at Doverlane Music Academy, Manindra Sangeet Tirtha, Bhowanipore Sangeet Sammilani.

== Early life ==
Koushik was born 1975 in Howrah, India. He is son of Rama Bhattacharjee and classical vocalist, the late Pt. Pataki Bhattacharjee. At age of Seven, he started learning Indian Classical Music under guidance of Late Pt. Pataki Bhattacharjee and later after getting selected as a scholar at ITC Sangeet Research Academy he continued his training under Pt. Arun Bhaduri and Late. Pt. K G Ginde. He eventually became the "Ganda Bandh Shagird" of late Pt. K.G. Ginde and also trained later under the guidance of Pt. Sunil Bose.

== Career ==
Koushik has participated in concerts, including the Dover Lane Music Conference, the ITC Sangeet Sammelan, the West Bengal State Music Conference, Uttarpara Sangeet Chakra, etc. in India and Radio France, Association Ganapati (Bordeaux, France), Theatre of La Rochelle (La Rochelle, France), ITC Tour in USA & Canada, different Countries of Europe, etc.

== Awards and discography ==
- "Samanwaya" (Audio CD) was released at Calcutta Press Club, released by Sagarika Music.
- "Meditative Midnight" (Indian Classical – Video DVD) Released by Questz World.
- "Refusion" (Eastern/Western Classical Fusion – Audio CD) Released by Questz World.
- "Laagi Lagan" (Indian Classical – Audio CD) Released by Questz World.

== Manindra Sangeet Tirtha ==
Manindra Sangeet Tirtha is an Indian Classical Music School established by Late Pt. Pataki Bhattacharjee in 1970 in the name of Koushik Bhattacharjee's Grandfather Late Pt. Manindranath Bhattacharjee, a Dhrupad Singer.
