= Sakuntala Narasimhan =

Indian vocalist, journalist and consumer rights activist (1939–2026)

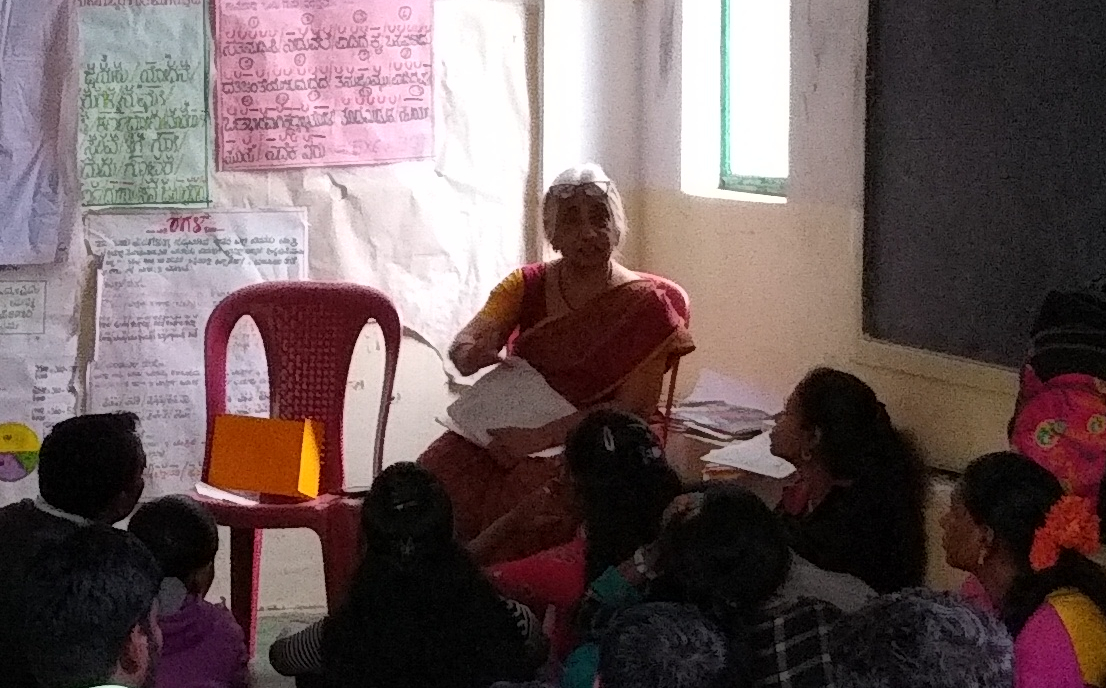
- Narasimhan in 2019

Background information
- Born: 30 December 1939
- Died: 18 November 2026 (aged 86)
- Genres: Hindustani classical, Carnatic music
- Occupations: Singer, journalist, activist
- Years active: 1952–2026

Sakuntala Narasimhan (30 December 1939 – 18 November 2026) was an Indian journalist, consumer rights activist, and classical vocalist from the Rampur-Sahaswan gharana of Hindustani classical music. She was a disciple of Hafeez Ahmed Khan and is the only vocalist in India to have performed in the National Programme of Music organised by Doordarshan and All India Radio in both Carnatic and Hindustani styles. Narasimhan was trained in Carnatic classical music by vocalists Musiri Subramania Iyer and Thanjavur Brinda. She was the only artist doing a "self-jugalbandi", juxtaposing the two styles.

== Early life and education ==
Narasimhan held a MA degree in Economics and postgraduate degrees in classical music. She had two doctorates—one in women's studies and another in musicology. She lived in Delhi during 1947 when India became independent, around the time of the partition of India, then moved to Mumbai and later Bengaluru. Her doctoral thesis in musicology was on a comparative study of the Carnatic and Hindustani styles. Sakuntala started performing at an early age for All India Radio and was a performing artist for SPIC MACAY.

== Career ==
As a journalist, Sakuntala worked for seven years with The Times of India group at Mumbai. She reported on the U.N. Global Conference on Women in China for the Deccan Herald in 1995 and on the 23rd UN General Assembly session in New York in 2000. She was also one of four Indian journalists selected to attend and write about the World Summit on Sustainable Development in South Africa in 2002. Her columns ran in the Deccan Herald for 27 years until 2009, and she later wrote for The Wire, Citizen Matters, and Moneylife.

Narasimhan taught music at the Bombay University and has taught journalism, women's studies, and economics at the Bangalore University at the postgraduate level. She also taught in the United States on a Fulbright fellowship. Narasimhan presented papers at international conferences on media, music, and feminist studies in the United States, Britain, Norway, Pakistan, Kenya, Uganda, the Philippines, Indonesia, Japan, Thailand, and Australia.

== Death ==
Narasimhan died on 18 November 2026, at the age of 86.

== Awards ==
- AIR awards in Thumri and Khayal in 1957 and 1958
- 5 Gyan Samaj Music Academy Awards, Madras, in the 1980s
- Chameli Devi Jain Award for Outstanding Women Mediapersons in 1983
- 'Journalism for Human Rights’ Award by People's Union for Civil Liberties in 2000
- Karnataka Rajyotsava Awards in 2016

== Works ==
Narasimhan published around 4,000 articles for various news outlets and journals and authored 11 books, on consumer rights, music and feminist issues. Her writings have been translated into Russian, German, Swedish, Japanese, Hindi, Tamil, Malayalam, Kannada, and Telugu. Below are some of her selected writings and books:

- Sakuntala Narasimhan, Born unfree: a selection of articles on practices and policies affecting women in India. NMKRV, First Grade College for Women, 1989.
- Sakuntala Narasimhan, Sati: Widow Burning in India. HarperCollins India, 1998. ISBN 81-722-3292-6.
- Sakuntala Narasimhan, Kamaladevi Chattopadhyay: The Romantic Rebel. New Dawn Books, 1999. ISBN 81-207-2120-9.
- Sakuntala Narasimhan, Empowering Women: An Alternative Strategy from Rural India. SAGE Publications Pvt. Ltd, 1999. ISBN 07-619-9340-1.
- Sakuntala Narasimhan, The splendour of the Rampur-sahaswan gharana of Hindustani music, its evolution, history, characteristics, and compositions. Veenapani Centre for Arts, 2006.
- Narasimhan, Sakuntala (2007). "Affirmative Action: Cross-Commonalities in the Backlash". Economic and Political Weekly. 42 (16): 1414–1416. JSTOR 4419489.
