= Malini Rajurkar =

Indian classical singer (1941–2023)

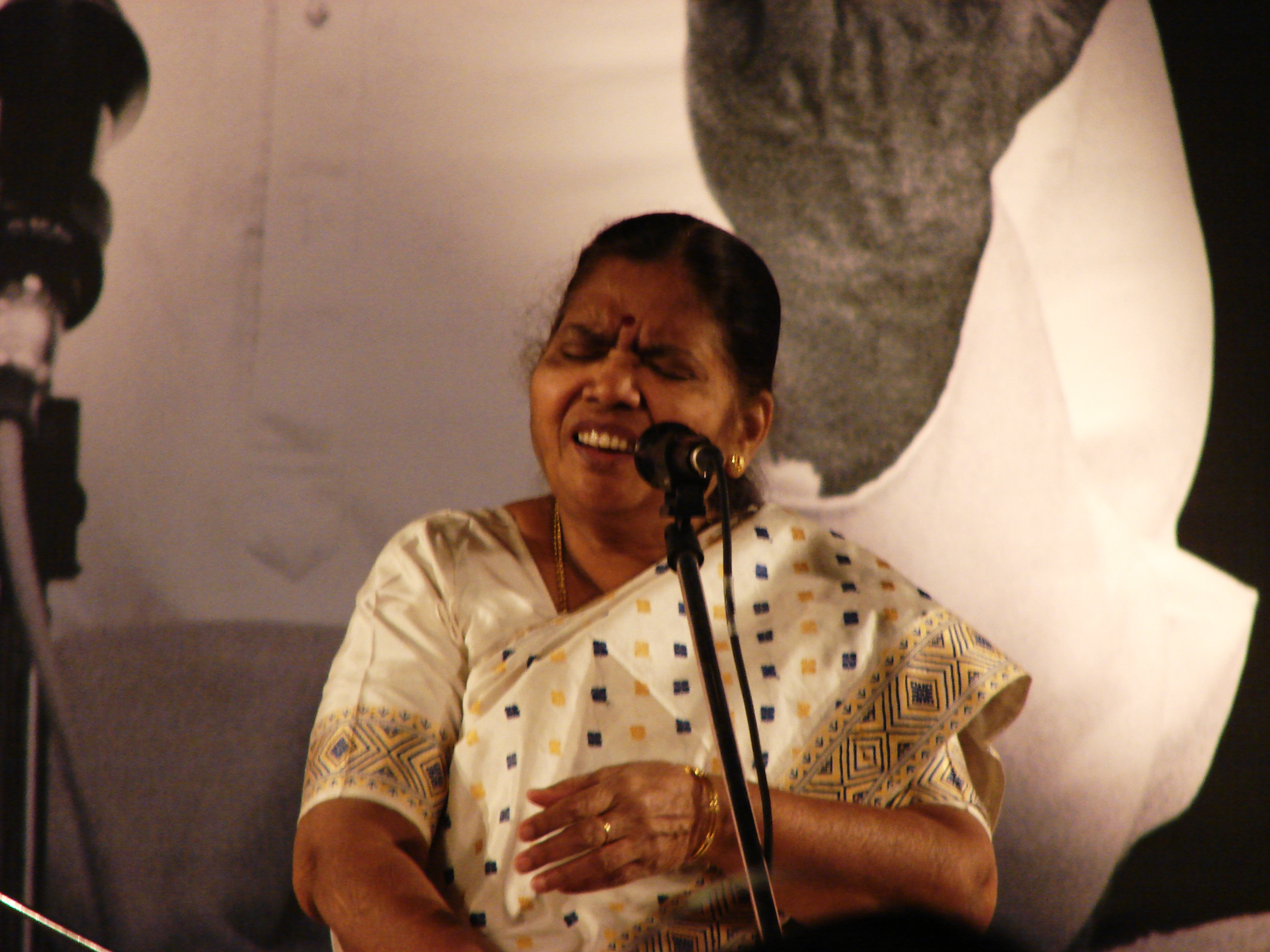
- Malini Rajurkar in 2011

Background information
- Born: 8 January 1941; Rajasthan, India
- Died: 6 September 2023 (aged 82) Hyderabad, India
- Genres: Classical, Devotional, Folk
- Occupations: Singer, musician
- Instruments: Vocals, Harmonium, Tanpura
- Years active: 1966–20??
- Labels: His Master's Voice

Malini Rajurkar (8 January 1941 – 6 September 2023) was an Indian Hindustani classical singer of Gwalior Gharana.

== Early life ==
Malini Rajurkar grew up in the state of Rajasthan in India. For three years she taught mathematics at the Savitri Girls’ High School & College, Ajmer, where she had graduated in the same subject. Taking advantage of a three-year scholarship that came her way, she finished her Sangeet Nipun from the Ajmer Music College, studying music under the guidance of Govindrao Rajurkar and his nephew, who was to become her future husband, Vasantrao Rajurkar.

== Performing career ==
Malini performed in major music festivals in India for nearly fifty years, including Gunidas Sammelan (Mumbai), Tansen Samaroh (Gwalior), Sawai Gandharva Bhimsen Festival (Pune), and Shankar Lal Festival (Delhi).

Malini is noted especially for her command over the Tappa, her Khyal renditions and the Tarana genre. She also sung lighter music. Her renditions of Marathi natyageete, pandu-nrupati janak jaya, naravar krishnasamaan, ya bhavanatil geet purane have been particularly popular.

== Death ==
Rajurkar died in Hyderabad on 6 September 2023, at the age of 82. She is survived by two daughters and a granddaughter.

== Awards ==
- Sangeet Natak Academy Award 2001
