= Inayat Hussain =

Inayat Hussain is the name of:

- Inayat Hussain Khan (1849–1919), Indian classical vocalist
- Inayat Hussain (composer) (1916–1993), Pakistani film music composer
- Inayat Hussain Bhatti (1928–1999), Pakistani film playback singer, actor, producer, director, scriptwriter
- Inayat Hussain (officer), a three-star general in the Pakistan Army
