= Sulochana Brahaspati =

Indian classical musician

- Origin: Allahabad, India
- Genre: Indian classical music
- Instrument: Singer
- Website: http://www.sulochanabrahaspati.net

Sulochana Brahaspati (born 1937, in Allahabad) is one of the noted vocalist of Hindustani classical music.

In 1994, she was awarded the Sangeet Natak Akademi Award, the highest Indian recognition given to practicing artists, given by the Sangeet Natak Akademi, India's National Academy of Music, Dance & Drama.

== Background ==
She is a vocalist and an exponent of the Rampur-Sadarang Parampara. She learned music from Pandit Bholanath Bhat and Ustad Mushtaq Hussain Khan (d. 1964) of Rampur-Sahaswan Gharana. Later she received intensive training from her guru, and her husband, Acharya K.C.D. Brahaspati. A large number of his compositions – Khayals, Thumris, Tappas, and Dadras – are part of her portfolio.

She is also an accomplished teacher and musicologist and has published books including Raga Rahasya.

== Awards ==
- Sangeet Natak Akademi Award in 1994.
- Uttar Pradesh Sangeet Natak Academy Award in 1984.
- Tansen Samman by Madhya Pradesh government in 2006.
