= Aagaman =

1982 film by Muzaffar Ali

- Directed by: Muzaffar Ali
- Written by: Asghar Wajahat
- Story by: R. Trivedi
- Produced by: Uttar Pradesh Sugarcane Seed and Development Corporation
- Starring: Anupam Kher; Rani Deepa; Suresh Oberoi; Saeed Jaffrey; Dilip Dhawan
- Music by: Ustad Ghulam Mustafa Khan
- Production company: Integrated Films
- Release date: 1982
- Running time: 150 minutes
- Country: India
- Language: Hindi

Aagaman is a 1982 Hindi language drama film directed by Muzaffar Ali and produced by Uttar Pradesh Sugarcane Seed and Development Corporation under the banner of Integrated Films. The cast included Saeed Jaffrey, Suresh Oberoi, Dilip Dhawan, Anupam Kher, Bharat Bhushan and Raj Bisaria. The film marked the debut of Kher. The plot involved the politics and working techniques of Uttar Pradesh sugarcane co-operative societies.

Upon release, it received mixed reviews from critics.

The film was also shown at the 43rd International Film Festival of India in 2012.

== Plot ==
In a village of Awadh, sugarcane planters are exploited by mill owner (Bharat Bhushan). A young man (Suresh Oberoi) returns to this village after receiving a degree in law from a reputed university of Lucknow. Seeing the poor condition of planters, he urges them to stop selling their sugarcane to the mill owner and instead start their own co-operative mill. The mill owner, his landlord-agent (Saeed Jaffrey) and son discourage the villagers from doing so. The mill owner's son urges the people to form a planter's union and continue selling their crop to the mill. Initially, the villagers trust him, but after continuous persuasions from the young man and realising that only self-sufficiency can improve their condition, they unite and set up their own mill. In the end, the young man marries a village girl (Deepa), who was very active in the movement.

== Cast ==
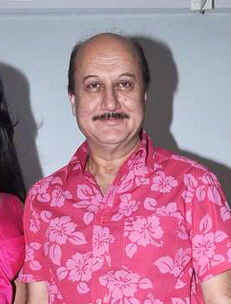
Aagaman marked Anupam Kher's theatrical film debut

- Bharat Bhushan as Mill owner
- Saeed Jaffrey as Mill owner's agent
- Suresh Oberoi as The young man
- Deepa as Village girl

== Soundtrack ==
1. "Ab Toot Girengi Zanjeere" - Hariharan
2. "Ab Tut Girengi Zanjire" (Part-2) - Hariharan, Ghulam Mustafa Khan
3. "Junoon Ki Yaad Manao" - Hariharan
4. "Chhoone Na Doongi Sharir" - Anuradha Paudwal
5. "Nisar Mai Teri Galiyo Pe" - Ghulam Mustafa Khan
6. "Ye Daagh Daagh Ujala" (Part-2) - Ghulam Mustafa Khan
7. "Ye Gaagh Daagh Ujala" (Part-3) - Anuradha Paudwal
8. "Yeh Daagh Daagh Ujala" - Anuradha Paudwal

== Production ==
The then chief minister of Uttar Pradesh, Vishwanath Pratap Singh asked Muzaffar Ali to make a film for promoting the sugarcane co-operative societies in the state. Uttar Pradesh Sugarcane Seed and Development Corporation provided the necessary budget. R. N. Trivedi and Asghar Wajahat wrote the film's story, Ustad Ghulam Mustafa Khan composed the film's music and the lyrics were written by Faiz Ahmad Faiz and Hasrat Jaipuri.

== Reviews ==
Upon release, the film received mixed reviews from film critics. Muzaffar Ali's early films like Gaman, Umrao Jaan and Aagaman focused on Awadh. In an article published in 2012, Business Standard noted that "To [Muzaffar] Ali goes the credit of portraying Awadh truthfully on cinema; the only other claimant being Satyajit Ray in Shatranj Ke Khiladi". Sumit Mitra of India Today called it a disappointing film and criticised Ali's film-making technique and cinematography. He added that "Ali's approach to direction is more that of film club enthusiast than film maker" and the lyrics used were "totally out of context". Mitra criticised the promotional nature of the film by saying that the state owned co-operative societies have dominated the market, but praised Saeed Jaffrey's acting.
