= Ghulam Mustafa Khan (singer) =

Indian Hindustani classical vocalist (1931–2021)

Ustad Ghulam Mustafa Khan
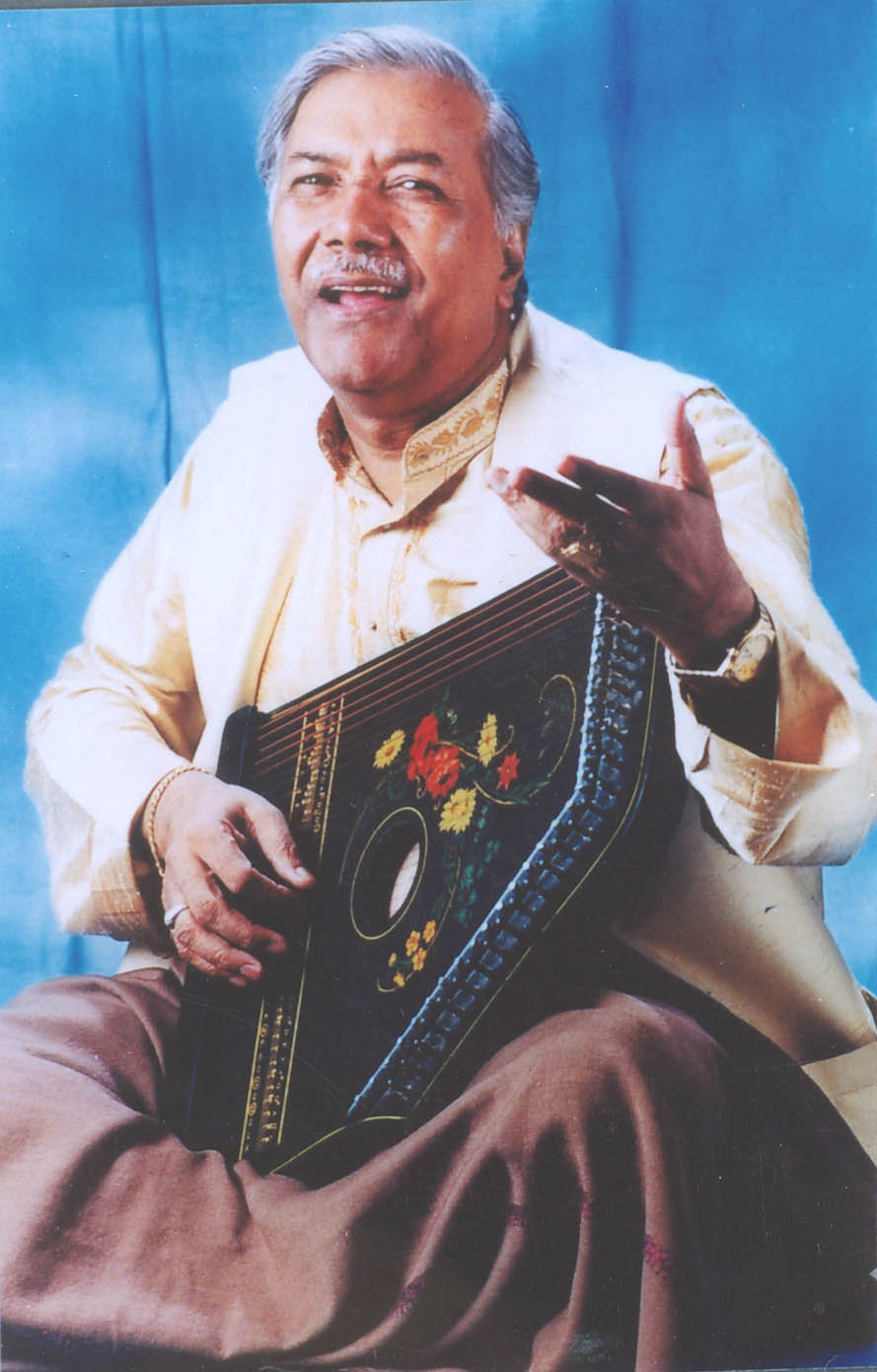
- In 2004

Background information
- Born: 3 March 1931; Badayun, United Provinces of Agra and Oudh, British India (present-day Uttar Pradesh, India)
- Origin: Badayun
- Died: 17 January 2021 (aged 89) Mumbai, Maharashtra, India
- Genre: Hindustani classical music
- Occupation: Singer
- Years active: 1952–2021
- Labels: Saregama, Tips Music, Magnasound Media, Universal Music, Sony Music India, T-Series, Saga Music, Nimbus Records, Navras Records.
- Website: ustadghulammustafakhan.com

Ustad Ghulam Mustafa Khan (3 March 1931 – 17 January 2021) was an Indian classical musician in the Hindustani classical music tradition, belonging to the Rampur-Sahaswan Gharana.

He was awarded the Padma Shri in 1991, followed by Padma Bhushan in 2006 and Padma Vibhushan in 2018. In 2003 he was awarded the Sangeet Natak Akademi Award, the highest Indian recognition given to practicing artists by the Sangeet Natak Akademi, India's National Academy for Music, Dance and Drama.

== Early life ==
Ghulam Mustafa Khan was born in Badayun, Uttar Pradesh on 3 March 1931. His father's name was Ustad Waris Hussain Khan who was from a family of musicians. His mother, Sabri Begum, was the daughter of the great Ustad Inayat Hussain Khan and music was the legacy of his family. Inayat Hussain Khan was the court musician during the reign of King Wajid Ali Shah and also the son-in-law of the pioneer of Gwalior Gharana Ustad Haddu Khan.

Since both Ustad Ghulam Mustafa Khan's parents wanted him to be a singer, his training in music started at a very young age, when he could remember the tune but could not understand the words. After his father, he was trained by Ustaad Fida Hussain Khan who was the court musician at the Baroda's royal Darbar, and then from his cousin, Ustad Nissar Hussain Khan. The traditional styles of Rampur, Gwalior and Sahaswan gharanas were therefore part of his performance.

At the time, every city had a Victoria Garden and it was the custom that on Janmashtami, the first public performance of those interested in music be performed as a debut. Ali Maqsood, the Chairman of the Municipality of Budaun (Ustad Ghulam Mustafa's birthplace), organised the Janmashtami function every year and asked Ustad Ghulam Mustafa Khan to perform when he was 8 years old.

Ghulam Mustafa Khan started singing professionally and became an artist at All India Radio at a very young age.

== Career ==
Ustad Ghulam Mustafa was awarded the Padmashri in 1991, the Sangeet Natak Academy Award in 2003, the Padmabhushan in 2006, and the Padma Vibhushan in 2018.

Though Ustad Ji was skeptical to sing in films as he wanted to keep the cultural heritage of the Rampur Sahaswan gharana and Hindustani classical music, he did very limited film songs, the first film he sang for was in Marathi, ‘Chand Pretticha’. From 1957, he started singing playback for Marathi and Gujarati films. He started with Mrinal Sen’s ‘Bhuvan Shome’ and sang ‘Sajanaa kahe nahin aaye...’ for ‘Badnaam Basti’ under the same music director, Vijay Raghav Rao. He played the role of Baiju Bawra in a German Documentary "Rain Maker" shot in Jaipur, besides being playback singer in the same film. He has given his voice to more than 70 documentary films made by Films Division, many of them receiving international & National Awards. He has performed across India and all across the globe.

From the late 1950s, he has been a guru to Lata Mangeshkar, Asha Bhosle, Manna Dey, Kamal Barot, Waheeda Rehman, Ranu Mukherjee, Amit Kumar, Laxmi Nayampalli, Geeta Dutt, A. R. Rahman, Hariharan, Shaan and Sonu Nigam, Sagarika, Alisha Chinoy, Shilpa Rao, and Kalpana Patowary were all his students.

Aftab Ahmad Khan is his youngest brother & disciple. His four sons Ghulam Murtuza, Ghulam Qadir, Rabbani Mustafa Khan and Ghulam Hasan Khan were also trained by him. Currently they are professional singers. Murtaza and Qadir have sung in films like Fiza, Meenaxi: A Tale of Three Cities, Saathiya, Guru, Mangal Pandey. Rabbani Mustafa Khan, his third son has sung songs with Times music like "Naina", "aaoni saiyon" and songs for films like "peer meri piya jaane na" from mera fauzi calling and "allah hu" from Sarabjit. His grandsons Faiz, Aamir, and Zain also received their taalim (education) from him.

In Coke Studio, composer A. R. Rahman shared the stage with his 82-year-old guru, also featuring his four sons- Murtuza, Qadir, Rabbani and Hasan and his 12-year-old grandson, Faiz. All five vocalists and Rahman collaborated on two numbers as a part of Ghulam Mustafa Khan's 3 generation performance.

== Personal life ==
Ustad Ghulam Mustafa Khan was married to Amina Begum who is granddaughter of the first recipient of Padma Bhushan Ustad Mushtaq Hussain Khan. They have four daughters and four sons who are Murtuza Mustafa, Qadir Mustafa, Rabbani Mustafa and Hasan Mustafa.

== Family ==
Ustad Ji has four daughters and four sons Murtuza Mustafa, Qadir Mustafa, Rabbani Mustafa Khan and Hasan Mustafa and were trained by him in music.

Moreover his son Ghulam Murtuza Mustafa trained the singers and celebrities like Lucky Ali, Khatija Rahman, Raheema Rahman, A. R. Ameen (Children Of Music Composer A.R.Rahman), Tabu, Huma Qureshi, Manmeet Singh, Khushboo Grewal, Neeti Mohan, Mohammed Irfan, Anushka Manchanda, Priyani Vani, Aishwarya Shankar, Aditi Shankar, Anjana Sukhani, Shazahn Padamsee, Shashwat Singh, Ashima Mahajan, Shefali Alvare, Garima Jain, whereas Qadir Mustafa trained celebrities Elli Avram, VJ Andy, Terence Lewis, Armaan Mallik, Shraddha Kapoor, Rasha Thadani, Manav Gohil, Narayani Shastri, Simple Kaul, Tanzeel Khan, Band of boys, Sudhanshu Pandey, Turab Jaffery. His other son Hasan Mustafa Khan, who has sung in Coke Studio3 songs "Aao Balma" and "Soz-o-Salam", and has also trained Shaan, Maahi (Subh Mujherjee, actor Aashim Gulati, Arjun Kanungo, and actor, singer, dancer Arjun Tanwar.

Ustad Ghulam Mustafa Khan's daughter-in-law Namrata Gupta Khan who owns NR Talent and Event Management presents a landmark concert titled 'Haazri' that pays homage to the late legend every 17 January.

== Death ==
Ustad Ji died on 17 January 2021 at his residence in Mumbai, aged 89. His family did not expect the sudden death as yet, the family had arranged a 24-hour nurse at his home. He had suffered a stroke in 2019 which left the left side of his body paralysed.

One of his disciples A. R. Rahman, a noted musician himself, remembered him as the "sweetest teacher".

Lata Mangeshkar, another disciple, was deeply saddened by the news of his death.

Noted Indian musician Amjad Ali Khan said he was "heartbroken" at the news of his death.

== Awards and achievements ==
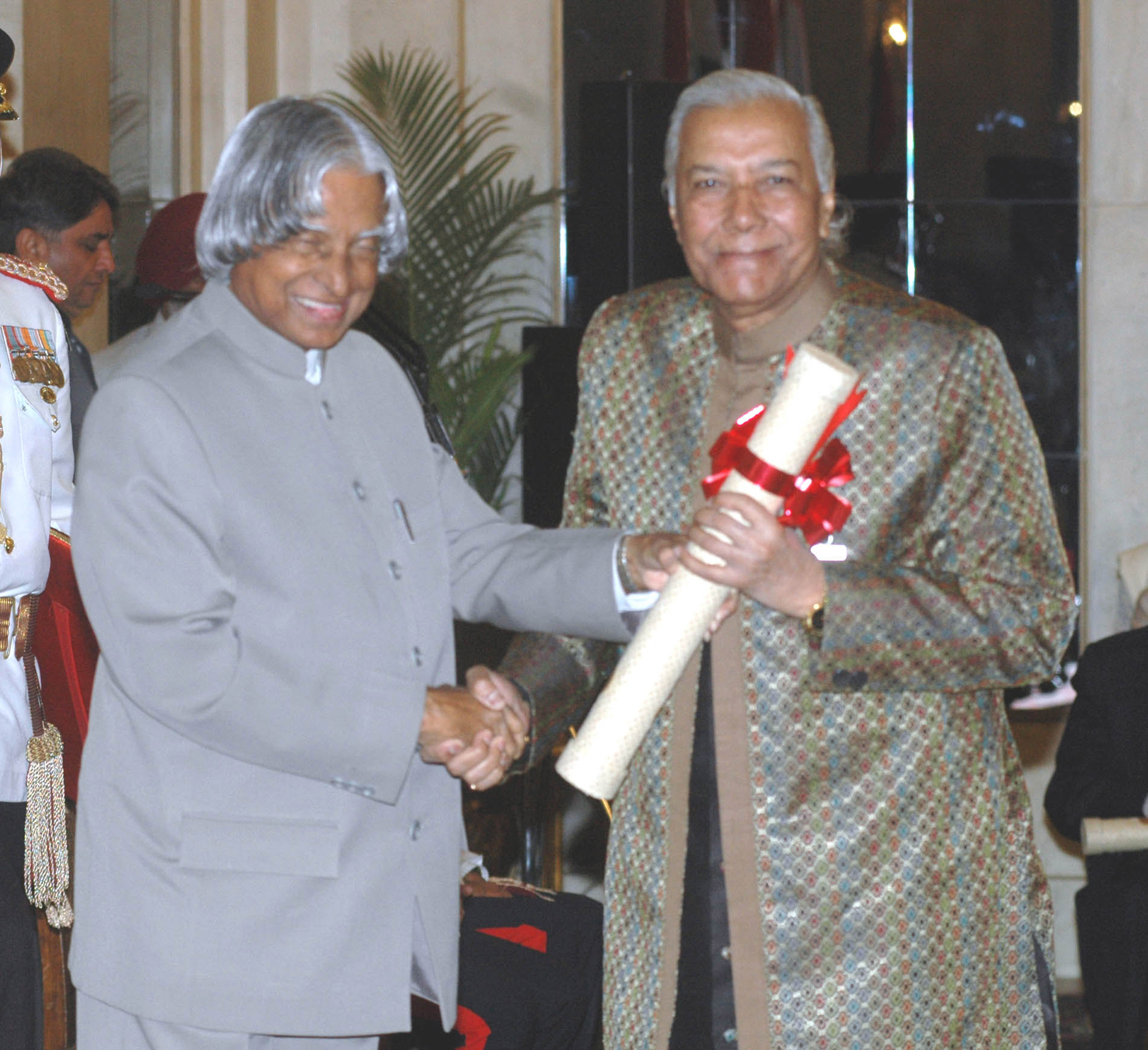
The President, Dr. A.P.J. Abdul Kalam presenting the Padma Bhushan Award – 2006 to an eminent maestro of classical vocal music Ustad Ghulam Mustafa Khan, in New Delhi on 20 March 2006

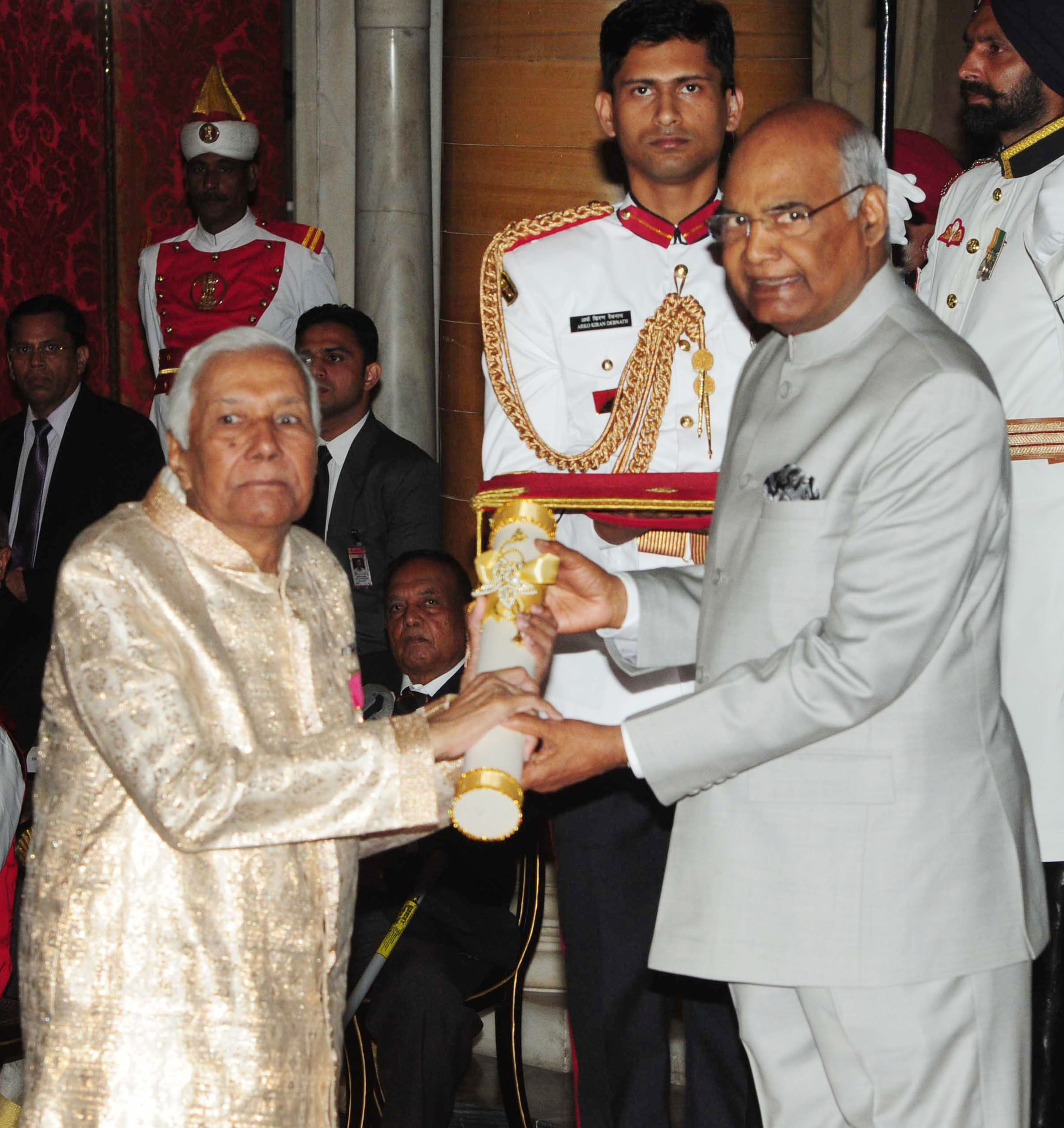
The President, Shri Ram Nath Kovind presenting the Padma Vibhushan Award to Ustad Ghulam Mustafa Khan, at the Civil Investiture Ceremony, at Rashtrapati Bhavan, in New Delhi on 20 March 2018

=== National awards ===
- Padma Shri (1991) – conferred by Shri R.Venkatraman (Honorable President of India). Fourth highest Indian civilian award
- Sangeet Natak Akademi Award (2003) – conferred by Shri APJ Abdul Kalam, Honourable President of India. It is the highest Indian recognition given to practicing artists given by Sangeet Natak Akademi, India's National Academy for Music, Dance and Drama.
- Padma Bhushan (2006) – conferred by Shri APJ Abdul Kalam (Honourable President of India). The Padma Bhushan is the third-highest civilian award in the Republic of India.
- Padma Vibhushan (2018) – 2nd highest civilian award in India

=== Other awards ===
- Conferred prestigious 'National Tansen Samman’ by the Government of Madhya Pradesh in the year 2008. It is a musical award conferred to the exponents[4] of Hindustani music in the year 2008.
- Pandit Dinanath Mangeshkar Award in 2011 by Smt. Lata Mangeshkar.
- Conferred "Uttam Vag- Geykar Jialal Vasant Award" In 2014 by Hon’ble Shri Dilip Walse – Patil.(Speaker of Maharashtra Legislative Assembly). The award is constituted by Acharya Jialal Vasant Sangeet Niketan as a token symbolising strong foundation awarded to Ustad Ghulam Mustafa Khan to recognise the incredible journey of music that has been and is still on and for contributing to the country.
- Conferred Yash Bharti Award in 2016 by Uttar Pradesh Chief Minister Akhilesh Yadav for earning laurel for the state in the country as well as in the world with his talent.
- Conferred the Ustad Haafiz Ali Khan award in 2003 by Shri Ram Vilas Paswan.
- Conferred the Ustad Chand Khan award.
- Conferred Pandit Basavaraj Rajguru National Memorial Trust award in 2016 by Minister Santosh Lad. The national award was instituted by the Swarasamrat Pandit Basavaraj Rajguru National Memorial Trust at Srujana Auditorium at Dharwad. Mustafa also presented a vocal recital on the occasion accompanied by Gulam Sultan Niyaz on the tabla, Ananth Kemkar on harmonium, and Liyakhat Ali Khan on sarangi.
- Honorary Citizenship for outstanding contribution to the field of Indian Classical Music in 1986 (by Governor of Maryland)
- He performed at Baltimore University and was conferred an Honorary Citizenship of Baltimore City.
- He performed at Golden Jubilee in the presence of the honorable Queen of United Kingdom.
- He performed at Festival de Lille in the presence of Lady Diana in France.
- He was honoured with Maharashtra Sanskrutik Puraskar.
- He was honoured with Tagore Ratna Award instituted by Central Sangeet Natak Academy in 2011.

== Discography ==
=== Filmography (Playbacks) ===
This a filmography for Ghulam Mustafa Khan's playbacks in Indian Film Industry.

| Release year | Song title | Album title | Label | Music director | Writer | Language |
|---|---|---|---|---|---|---|
| 1969 | – | Bhuvan Shome (By Mrinal Sen) | – | Pandit Vijay Raghav Rao | – | Hindi |
| 1968 | Marde Khuda | Noor Jahan | – | – | - | Farsi |
| 1972 | Sajna Kahe Nahi Aaye | Badnam Basti | Saregama | Vijay Raghav Rao | Virendra Mishra | Hindi |
| 1981 | Raagmala | Umrao Jaan [By Muzzafar Ali] | Saregama | Khayyam | Shahryar | Urdu Hindi |
| 1981 | Pratham Dhar Dhyan | Umrao Jaan [By Muzzafar Ali] | Saregama | Ustad Ghulam Mustafa Khan | Shahryar | Urdu Hindi |
| 1981 | Jhoola Kinne Daala Re | Umrao Jaan [By Muzzafar Ali] | Saregama | Ustad Ghulam Mustafa Khan | Shahryar | Urdu and Hindi |
| 1992 | Is Se Jyada Dukh Na Koi | Shreemaan Aashique | Tips Music | Nadeem-Shravan | Noor Kaskar, Sameer | Hindi |
| 2014 | You Fill My Life | Jal (film) | Saga Music | Bickram Ghosh, Sonu Nigam | Bickram Ghosh, Sonu Nigam | Hindi |
| 2016 | Maula | 31 October | Zee Music | Vijay Verma | – | Hindi |

=== Filmography (Music Direction) ===
This a filmography for Ghulam Mustafa Khan's projects as a music director in the Indian film industry.

| Release year | Album title | Label | Music director | Song's Title | Singer |
|---|---|---|---|---|---|
| 1988 | Aagaman | Saregama | Ustad Ghulam Mustafa Khan | Ab Toot Girengi Zanjeeren (Version 1) | Ustad Ghulam Mustafa Khan |
| 1988 | Aagaman | Saregama | Ustad Ghulam Mustafa Khan | Ab Toot Girengi Zanjeeren (Version 2) | Hariharan |
| 1988 | Aagaman | Saregama | Ustad Ghulam Mustafa Khan | Chhoone Na Doongi Sharir | Anuradha Paudwal |
| 1988 | Aagaman | Saregama | Ustad Ghulam Mustafa Khan | Junoon Ki Yaad Manao | Hariharan |
| 1988 | Aagaman | Saregama | Ustad Ghulam Mustafa Khan | Nisar Main Teri Galiyon Pe | Ustad Ghulam Mustafa Khan |
| 1988 | Aagaman | Saregama | Ustad Ghulam Mustafa Khan | Yeh Daagh Daagh Ujala (Version 1) | Ustad Ghulam Mustafa Khan |
| 1988 | Aagaman | Saregama | Ustad Ghulam Mustafa Khan | Yeh Daagh Daagh Ujala (Version 2) | Anuradha Paudwal |
| 1988 | Aagaman | Saregama | Ustad Ghulam Mustafa Khan | Yeh Daagh Daagh Ujala (Version 3) | Anuradha Paudwal |

=== Non Film (Singer) ===
This is the Non Film Work of Ghulam Mustafa Khan.

| Release year | Album title | Label | Genre | Song/s Title | Singer |
|---|---|---|---|---|---|
| 1994 | Raga Bilaskhani Todi, Raga Puriya & Raga Pilu | Nimbus Records | Indian Classical, Hindustani | Raga Bilaskhani Todi: Charan Gahe Ki Rakho Laj | Ustad Ghulam Mustafa Khan, Mashkoor Hussain Khan, Ghulam Sultan Naizi, Ghulam Qadir khan & Dr. Aparna Ghosh |
| 1994 | Raga Bilaskhani Todi, Raga Puriya & Raga Pilu | Nimbus Records | Indian Classical, Hindustani | Raga Bilaskhani Todi: Sakhi Sarwar Ke Darbar Dhayaung | Ustad Ghulam Mustafa Khan, Mashkoor Hussain Khan, Ghulam Sultan Naizi, Ghulam Qadir khan & Dr. Aparna Ghosh |
| 1994 | Raga Bilaskhani Todi, Raga Puriya & Raga Pilu | Nimbus Records | Indian Classical, Hindustani | Raga Puriya: Eh Piya Gunevanta | Ustad Ghulam Mustafa Khan, Mashkoor Hussain Khan, Ghulam Sultan Naizi, Ghulam Qadir khan & Dr. Aparna Ghosh |
| 1994 | Raga Bilaskhani Todi, Raga Puriya & Raga Pilu | Nimbus Records | Indian Classical, Hindustani | Raga Puriya: More Chature Piya | Ustad Ghulam Mustafa Khan, Mashkoor Hussain Khan, Ghulam Sultan Naizi, Ghulam Qadir khan & Dr. Aparna Ghosh |
| 1994 | Raga Bilaskhani Todi, Raga Puriya & Raga Pilu | Nimbus Records | Indian Classical, Hindustani | Raga Pilui: Ghir Ke Aayi Badaria Hai Raam | Ustad Ghulam Mustafa Khan, Mashkoor Hussain Khan, Ghulam Sultan Naizi, Ghulam Qadir khan & Dr. Aparna Ghosh |
| 1998 | Sur Dhwani | Navras Records | Indian Classical, Hindustani | Raga Durga Khyal in drut teental | Ustad Ghulam Mustafa Khan |
| 1998 | Sur Dhwani | Navras Records | Indian Classical, Hindustani | Raga Durga Khyal in Vilambit ektal | Ustad Ghulam Mustafa Khan |
| 1998 | Sur Dhwani | Navras Records | Indian Classical, Hindustani | Raga Jaijaivanti | Ustad Ghulam Mustafa Khan |
| 1998 | Sur Dhwani | Navras Records | Indian Classical, Hindustani | Ganesh Stuti | Ustad Ghulam Mustafa Khan |
| 1999 | Bhor Bhaye | Magnasound Records | Indian Classical, Hindustani | Raga Bhairav – Ayee Laree Bahar / Jag Karatar (Vilambit Ektal & Drut Teental) | Ustad Ghulam Mustafa Khan |
| 1999 | Bhor Bhaye | Magnasound Records | Indian Classical, Hindustani | Raga Anand Bhairav – Hun To Tore Karan Jagee (Drut Teental) | Ustad Ghulam Mustafa Khan |
| 1999 | Bhor Bhaye | Magnasound Records | Indian Classical, Hindustani | Raga Nat Bhairav – Palakan Rakhun Moond Moond (Drut Teental) | Ustad Ghulam Mustafa Khan |
| 1999 | Bhor Bhaye | Magnasound Records | Indian Classical, Hindustani | Me Dasi Tumhri | Ustad Ghulam Mustafa Khan |
| 1999 | Classic Gold Ustad N H M H Khan Gm Kh | Saregama | Indian Classical, Hindustani | Allah Jaane Todi (Original) | Ustad Nisar Hussain Khan, Ustad Mushtaq Husain Khan & Ustad Ghulam Mustafa Khan |
| 1999 | Classic Gold Ustad N H M H Khan Gm Kh | Saregama | Indian Classical, Hindustani | Chhanana Bichuwa Jaunpuri (Original) | Ustad Nisar Hussain Khan, Ustad Mushtaq Husain Khan & Ustad Ghulam Mustafa Khan |
| 1999 | Classic Gold Ustad N H M H Khan Gm Kh | Saregama | Indian Classical, Hindustani | Tarana Jaunpuri (Original) | Ustad Nisar Hussain Khan, Ustad Mushtaq Husain Khan & Ustad Ghulam Mustafa Khan |
| 1999 | Classic Gold Ustad N H M H Khan Gm Kh | Saregama | Indian Classical, Hindustani | Sham Bhai Bin ShamMishra Pilu (Original) | Ustad Nisar Hussain Khan, Ustad Mushtaq Husain Khan & Ustad Ghulam Mustafa Khan |
| 1999 | Classic Gold Ustad N H M H Khan Gm Kh | Saregama | Indian Classical, Hindustani | Kangan Mundariya Multani (Original) | Ustad Nisar Hussain Khan, Ustad Mushtaq Husain Khan & Ustad Ghulam Mustafa Khan |
| 1999 | Classic Gold Ustad N H M H Khan Gm Kh | Saregama | Indian Classical, Hindustani | Teri Maai RiYaman Kalyan (Original) | Ustad Nisar Hussain Khan, Ustad Mushtaq Husain Khan & Ustad Ghulam Mustafa Khan |
| 1999 | Classic Gold Ustad N H M H Khan Gm Kh | Saregama | Indian Classical, Hindustani | Koyaliya Kook Sunaye Khamaj (Original) | Ustad Nisar Hussain Khan, Ustad Mushtaq Husain Khan & Ustad Ghulam Mustafa Khan |
| 1999 | Classic Gold Ustad N H M H Khan Gm Kh | Saregama | Indian Classical, Hindustani | Banke Naina Thumri (Original) | Ustad Nisar Hussain Khan, Ustad Mushtaq Husain Khan & Ustad Ghulam Mustafa Khan |
| 1999 | Classic Gold Ustad N H M H Khan Gm Kh | Saregama | Indian Classical, Hindustani | Chain Na Phhio HamenDadra (Original) | Ustad Nisar Hussain Khan, Ustad Mushtaq Husain Khan & Ustad Ghulam Mustafa Khan |
| 1999 | Classic Gold Ustad N H M H Khan Gm Kh | Saregama | Indian Classical, Hindustani | Kaliyan Sang Karat Bahar (Original) | Ustad Nisar Hussain Khan, Ustad Mushtaq Husain Khan & Ustad Ghulam Mustafa Khan |
| 1999 | Classic Gold Ustad N H M H Khan Gm Kh | Saregama | Indian Classical, Hindustani | Miyan Malhar Tarana (Original) | Ustad Nisar Hussain Khan, Ustad Mushtaq Husain Khan & Ustad Ghulam Mustafa Khan |
| 1999 | Classic Gold Ustad N H M H Khan Gm Kh | Saregama | Indian Classical, Hindustani | Maan Swapno Mein Gaaye Basant (Original) | Ustad Nisar Hussain Khan, Ustad Mushtaq Husain Khan & Ustad Ghulam Mustafa Khan |
| 2000 | Rasrang (Kalyan Darshan) | Magnasound Records | Indian Classical, Hindustani | Raga Yaman-Kalyan – 'Kahe Sakhi' / 'Darshan Devo Shankar Mahadev' (Bandish in Ektal & Drut Teental) | Ustad Ghulam Mustafa Khan |
| 2000 | Rasrang (Kalyan Darshan) | Magnasound Records | Indian Classical, Hindustani | Raga Hussain Kalyan – 'Kahan Tein Tum Aaye Ho Balma' (Madhyalaya Bandish in Iqvai) | Ustad Ghulam Mustafa Khan |
| 2000 | Rasrang (Kalyan Darshan) | Magnasound Records | Indian Classical, Hindustani | Raga Hans Kalyan – 'Dhan Dhan Ganpati Ganesh' (Bandish in Drut Ektal) | Ustad Ghulam Mustafa Khan |
| 2000 | Rasrang (Kalyan Darshan) | Magnasound Records | Indian Classical, Hindustani | Raga Gorakh Kalyan (Madhyalaya Bandish in Teental) | Ustad Ghulam Mustafa Khan |
| 2000 | Rasrang (Kalyan Darshan) | Magnasound Records | Indian Classical, Hindustani | Raga Bhopali – Bhoop Kalyan (Madhyalaya Bandish in Teental) | Ustad Ghulam Mustafa Khan |
| 2002 | Universal Masters Collection Ustad Ghulam Mustafa Khan · | Universal Music | Indian Classical, Hindustani | Raga Kaushik Dhwani | Ustad Ghulam Mustafa Khan |
| 2002 | Universal Masters Collection Ustad Ghulam Mustafa Khan · | Universal Music | Indian Classical, Hindustani | Raga Darbari Kanhra | Ustad Ghulam Mustafa Khan |
| 2002 | Maestro's Choice | Living Media | Indian Classical, Hindustani | Raga Deepak | Ustad Ghulam Mustafa Khan |
| 2002 | Maestro's Choice | Living Media | Indian Classical, Hindustani | Raga Megh | Ustad Ghulam Mustafa Khan |
| 2002 | Maestro's Choice | Living Media | Indian Classical, Hindustani | Kajri – Raga Mishra Pilu | Ustad Ghulam Mustafa Khan |
| 2003 | Passage to India: Vocal Indi | Navras Records | Indian Classical | Durga | Ustad Ghulam Mustafa Khan |
| 2008 | Ibteda | Sense World Music | Indian Classical, Instrumental | Vilambit Khayal – Raga Kaunsi Kanada | Ustad Ghulam Mustafa Khan |
| 2008 | Ibteda | Sense World Music | Indian Classical, Instrumental | Bandish in Medium Teentaal – Raga Kaunsi Kanada | Ustad Ghulam Mustafa Khan |
| 2008 | Ibteda | Sense World Music | Indian Classical, Instrumental | Bandish in Drut Ektaal – Raga Kaunsi Kanada | Ustad Ghulam Mustafa Khan |
| 2008 | Ibteda | Sense World Music | Indian Classical, Instrumental | Bandish in Medium Teentaal – Raga Sindhura | Ustad Ghulam Mustafa Khan |
| 2012 | Raga Bilaskhani Todi – Raga Puriya – Raga Pilu (feat. Mashkoor Hussain Khan, Ghulam Sultan Naizi, Ghulham Qadir Khan & Dr. Aparna Ghosh) | Nimbus Records | Indian Classical | Raga Bilaskhani – khyal: Charan gahe ki rakho laj – vilambit Ektal | Ustad Ghulam Mustafa Khan & Dr. Aparna Ghosh |
| 2012 | Raga Bilaskhani Todi – Raga Puriya – Raga Pilu (feat. Mashkoor Hussain Khan, Ghulam Sultan Naizi, Ghulham Qadir Khan & Dr. Aparna Ghosh) | Nimbus Records | Indian Classical | Raga Bilaskhani – khyal: Sakhi Sarwar ke darbar dhayaung – drut Teental | Ustad Ghulam Mustafa Khan & Dr. Aparna Ghosh |
| 2012 | Raga Bilaskhani Todi – Raga Puriya – Raga Pilu (feat. Mashkoor Hussain Khan, Ghulam Sultan Naizi, Ghulham Qadir Khan & Dr. Aparna Ghosh) | Nimbus Records | Indian Classical | Raga Puriya – khyal: Eh piya gunevanta – vilambit Ektal | Ustad Ghulam Mustafa Khan & Dr. Aparna Ghosh |
| 2012 | Raga Bilaskhani Todi – Raga Puriya – Raga Pilu (feat. Mashkoor Hussain Khan, Ghulam Sultan Naizi, Ghulham Qadir Khan & Dr. Aparna Ghosh) | Nimbus Records | Indian Classical | Raga Puriya – khyal: More chature piya – drut Teental | Ustad Ghulam Mustafa Khan & Dr. Aparna Ghosh |
| 2012 | Raga Bilaskhani Todi – Raga Puriya – Raga Pilu (feat. Mashkoor Hussain Khan, Ghulam Sultan Naizi, Ghulham Qadir Khan & Dr. Aparna Ghosh) | Nimbus Records | Indian Classical | Raga Pilu – kajri: Ghir ke aayi badaria hai Raam – Kajri in dadra tal | Ustad Ghulam Mustafa Khan & Dr. Aparna Ghosh |
| 2013 | Groovy Ganesha | Times Music | Devotional | Kesariya | Ustad Ghulam Mustafa Khan |
| 2014 | Rabi' Al-Awwal Ka Special Guldasta, Vol. 1 | Digital Entertainment World | Asia, World | Zameem O Zaman Tumharay Liye | Ustad Ghulam Mustafa Khan |
| 2014 | Rabi' Al-Awwal Ka Special Guldasta, Vol. 1 | Digital Entertainment World | Asia, World | Sahara Chahiye Sarkar Zindagi Ke Lye | Ustad Ghulam Mustafa Khan |
| 2014 | Sur Dhwani | Navras Records | Indian Classical, Hindustani | Raga Durga: Khyal in Vilambit Ek Taal | Ustad Ghulam Mustafa Khan, Ustad Liyaqat Ali Khan, Ghulam Murtaza Khan, Ghulam Qadir khan, Mashkoor Hussain Khan & Ghulam Sultan Niazi |
| 2014 | Sur Dhwani | Navras Records | Indian Classical, Hindustani | Raga Durga: Khyal in Drut Teen Taal | Ustad Ghulam Mustafa Khan, Ustad Liyaqat Ali Khan, Ghulam Murtaza Khan, Ghulam Qadir khan, Mashkoor Hussain Khan & Ghulam Sultan Niazi |
| 2014 | Sur Dhwani | Navras Records | Indian Classical, Hindustani | Raga Jaijaivanti: Khyal in Madhya Laya Teen Taal | Ustad Ghulam Mustafa Khan, Ustad Liyaqat Ali Khan, Ghulam Murtaza Khan, Ghulam Qadir khan, Mashkoor Hussain Khan & Ghulam Sultan Niazi |
| 2014 | Sur Dhwani | Navras Records | Indian Classical, Hindustani | Raga Desh: Khyal in Madhya Laya Teen Taal & Khyal in Drut Teen Taal | Ustad Ghulam Mustafa Khan, Ustad Liyaqat Ali Khan, Ghulam Murtaza Khan, Ghulam Qadir khan, Mashkoor Hussain Khan & Ghulam Sultan Niazi |
| 2015 | Ibaadat | Red Ribbon Entertainment Pvt. Ltd. | World Music | Kaun Guzra Hai Mere Dil ki | Ustad Ghulam Mustafa Khan |
| 2015 | Ibaadat | Red Ribbon Entertainment Pvt. Ltd. | World Music | Paron ko kant ke udtne ki | Ustad Ghulam Mustafa Khan |
| 2016 | The Legend Padmabhushan Ghulam Mustafa Khan | Red Ribbon Entertainment Pvt. Ltd. | World Music | Kaun Guzra Hai Mere Dil Ki | Ustad Ghulam Mustafa Khan |
| 2016 | The Legend Padmabhushan Ghulam Mustafa Khan | Red Ribbon Entertainment Pvt. Ltd. | World Music | Paron Ko Kaant Ke Udne Ki Guzaarish i | Ustad Ghulam Mustafa Khan |
| 1997 | Ras Rang Vol 2 | Navras Records | Indian Classical | Ab Maan Jao Saiyan | Ustad Ghulam Mustafa Khan |

=== Collaborative Projects ===
| Year | Title | Song | Remarks |
|---|---|---|---|
| 2015 | – | Ek Naya Bharat | On the occasion of the Indian Independence Day on 15 August, musicians Ustad Ghulam Mustafa Khan, Sonu Nigam, Hariharan and Shaan among others have collaborated on a new patriotic song. Other artists such as Aamir Mustafa, Murtaza Mustafa, Qadir Mustafa, Rabbani Mustafa and Faiz Mustafa are also part of the collaboration. Presented by Amplify Times Music and Sarang Entertainment. |
| 2013 | Coke Studio @ MTV Season 3 | Aao Balma | |
| 2013 | Coke Studio @ MTV Season 3 | Soz O Salaam | |
| 2000 | – | Jana Gana Mana | Composed by AR Rahman, Produced by Bharat Bala Productions & Sung by Ustad Ghulam Mustafa Khan, Ghulam Murtuza Khan, Ghulam Qadir Khan] |
| 2016 | – | Jana Gana Mana | Sung by Ustad Ghulam Mustafa Khan, Ghulam Murtuza Khan, Ghulam Qadir Khan, Ghulam Rabbani Khan, Faiz Mustafa, Aamir Mustafa & Fans] |

=== Non Film [Music Direction] ===
This is the non film work of Ustad Ghulam Mustafa Khan as the music director.

| Year | Album name | Label | Genre | Singer | Writer | Music director | Song/s |
|---|---|---|---|---|---|---|---|
| 2001 | Mayer – E – Ghazal | Tips Music | Ghazal | Ustad Ghulam Mustafa Khan | Ustad Ghulam Mustafa Khan | Ustad Ghulam Mustafa Khan | Sabse Haskar Milnewale Mil Jaaye Gar Sharaab Toh Khanaye Dil Hua Humne Dekha Hai – 2 Humne Dekha Hai Band Kamre Mein – 2 Band Kamre Mein Ab Toh Aye Gesuye Jana Aap Aaye Na Bahaaron Ke Sisheka Aadmi Hoon |
| 2001 | Aatma | Sony Music | – | Colonial Cousins | Munawar Masoom, Leslie Lewis, Milind Joshi, Thyagaraja, Tahir Faraz, Dev Kohli, Traditional, Ustad Ghulam Mustafa Khan, Ibrahim Ashq | Hariharan, Leslie Lewis, Jaidev, Ustad Ghulam Mustafa Khan | Guiding Star Mata Pita Dheem Dheem Dhirena Dil Mein Tu I Love You Girl Sri Rama Kai Zhala Turn Around Angel Eyes Sundar Balma |
| 2012 | Call me Rashid | T Series | – | Rashid Ali | Raqueeb Alam, Ahmad Faraz | Ali Salimi, Rashid Ali, Ustad Ghulam Mustafa Khan, A.R. Rahman | Ayrilik Baila (Instrumental) Jin Ke Dum Se Kabhi Kabhi Aditi (Remix) Parda Parda Saahil Hai Kinara Saahil Hai Kinara (Reprise) Soch Zara Something On Your Mind Sookhi Nadi Tears Of Joy (Instrumental) Zarra Zarra |
| 1981 | Ghazal Ka Mausam | Universal Music | Ghazal | Hariharan | Abdul Hai Anjum, Shahryar, Qabil Ajmeri, Mirza Ghalib, Mir Taqi Mir, Mumtaz Rashid | Ustad Ghulam Mustafa Khan | Dayam Pada Hua Khud Ko Behtar Hai Hasti Apni Habaab Kisi Hai Nishaan Yun To Patthar Sulag Rahe The |
