= Hafeez Ahmed Khan =

Indian classical musician (died 2006)

- Born: 15 March 1926; Uttar Pradesh, India
- Died: 5 July 2006 (aged 80); New Delhi, India
- Occupation: Classical musician
- Known for: Rampur-Sahaswan gharana - Hindustani music
- Awards: Padma Shri by the Government of India in 1991; Sangeet Natak Akademi Award in 1996

Hafeez Ahmed Khan (15 March 1926 – 5 July 2006) was an Indian classical musician of Hindustani classical music.

He is known as one of the leading exponents of the Rampur-Sahaswan gharana, a musical school popular in the northern parts of the Indian state of Uttar Pradesh.

== Career ==
Hafeez Ahmed Khan was born on 15 March 1926 in Uttar Pradesh, British India. He learned music in gurukul system and pursued his academic studies the conventional way, secured a master's degree in politics and taught at the University of Minnesota. Due to his fluency in English language, on his overseas concerts, he was able to explain Indian classical music's intricacies and help foreigners understand the music. He toured the United States, Europe, Afghanistan, Nepal and Pakistan during his career.

The court musicians of Rampur-Sahaswan gharana were given support and patronage by the Nawab of Rampur in British India after Delhi Durbar (Delhi Court) and Oudh Durbar (Oudh or Lucknow Court) fell to the British forces. Nawabs of Rampur were known for their love of musicians.

== Music educator ==
He was a deputy director of the All India Radio and the vice chancellor of the Indira Kala Sangeet University, the only Indian university dedicated to music.

He mentored many disciples such as Rajendra Prasanna, Roma Rani Bhattacharya, Sakuntala Narasimhan and Subhendu Ghosh and acted in a German movie on the life of Tansen, called The Rain Maker.

== Awards and recognition ==
- He was a recipient of the 1996 Sangeet Natak Akademi Award for his lifetime contributions to music.
- The Government of India awarded him the fourth highest civilian honour of Padma Shri in 1991.

== Death ==
Hafeez Ahmed Khan, who was married to the daughter of renowned singer, Nissar Hussain Khan, died on 5 July 2006 at age 80.

== See also ==
- Rampur-Sahaswan gharana
- Rajendra Prasanna
- Indira Kala Sangeet University
- Nissar Hussain Khan
