= Sahaswan =

- city
- Location in Uttar Pradesh, India
- Coordinates: 28.068°N 78.751°E
- Country: India
- State: Uttar Pradesh
- District: Budaun

Area
  - Total: 52 km^{2} (20 sq mi)
- Elevation: 172 m (564 ft)

Population (2011)
  - Total: 66,204
  - Density: 1,300/km^{2} (3,300/sq mi)
- Time zone: UTC+5:30 (IST)
- PIN: 243638
- Vehicle registration: UP 24

Sahaswan is a city and a municipal board in Budaun district in the Indian state of western Uttar Pradesh. It is also an administrative Block, 0177 is the block code.

== Demographics ==
According to 2011 Census of India the total area of the Sahaswan is 422.39 km^{2}, total houses in the town are 36,026 and total population is 2,11,087 out of 1,13,625 are males and 97,462 are females.

== Etymology ==
The name Sahaswan is derived from the greatest emperor and the ruler of the entire globe who ruled the world from the kingdom of Mahishmati namely Rajrajeshwar Chakravarti Samrat Kartavirya Sahasrarjun Maharaj. The name, Sahaswan, actually derived from the name "Sahasrarjun" from the whole name.

== Rampur - Sahaswan Gharana ==
Sahaswan has given name to Rampur–Sahaswan gharana that has produced many famous singers.

== Notable people ==
=== Academician ===
- Dr Akram Ahmad

=== Singers ===
- Inayat Hussain Khan - founder of Sahaswan Gharana
- Ghulam Mustafa Khan - singer who is the only Padmavi bhushan awardee from Budaun.
- Ghulam Sadiq Khan - Padmashri Awardee
- Rashid Khan - Padmashri Awardee

=== Politicians ===
- Omkar Singh Yadav (b 1951), MLA for Sahaswan
