= Tansen Samaroh =

Classical music festival

- Dates: 4 days December
- Locations: Gwalior district, Madhya Pradesh
- Years active: 1950s-present

Tansen Samaroh or Tansen Sangeet Samaroh (Hindi: तानसेन समारोह) is celebrated every year in the month of December in Behat village of Gwalior district, Madhya Pradesh. It is a 4-day musical extravaganza. Artists and music lovers from all over the world gather here to pay tribute to the Great Indian Musical Maestro Tansen. The event is organized near the tomb of Tansen by Ustad Alauddin Khan Kala Evam Sangeet Academy, under the department of culture, Government of Madhya Pradesh. Artists from all over India are invited to deliver vocal and instrumental performances.

== National Music festival ==
Tansen Samaroh was originally a local festival but it was at the initiative of BV Keskar, who was Union Minister for Information and Broadcasting between 1952 and 1962, that Tansen Samaroh was turned into a popular national music festival.

== Tansen Samman ==
The 'National Tansen Samman' is a musical award conferred to the exponents

Year	Name	Field
1985	Asgari Bai	Dhrupad singer
2000	Ustad Abdul Haleem Jafar Khan	Sitar maestro
2001	Ustad Amjad Ali Khan	Sarod maestro
2002	Niyaz Ahmad Khan	
2003	Pandit Dinkar Kaykini	
2004	Pandit Shivkumar Sharma	Santoor maestro
2005	Maqbool Ahmed Sabri; Malini Rajurkar	one of the leading members and music composer of legendary Classical Qawwali group Sabri Brothers; Hindustani vocalist of the Gwalior gharana and acknowledged master of Tappa and Tarana
2006	Sulochana Brahaspati	Hindustani vocalist and exponent of the Rampur-Sahaswan gharana
2007	Pandit Gokulotsav Maharaj	Hindustani vocalist
2008	Ustad Ghulam Mustafa Khan	Hindustani vocalist and exponent of the Rampur-Sahaswan gharana
2009	Ajay Pohankar	Hindustani vocalist and exponent of the Kirana gharana
2010	Savita Devi	Hindustani vocalist from the Benaras Gharana
2011	Rajan and Sajan Mishra	Vocalist duo.
2013	Vishwa Mohan Bhatt	Hindustani classical music instrumentalist
2014	Pandit Prabhakar Karekar	Indian Classical vocalist.
2015	Pandit Ajoy Chakrabarty	Indian Hindustani classical vocalist of the Patiala-Kasur gharana
2015	Pt. Laxman Krishnarao Pandit	Vocalist (Son of Krishnarao Shankar Pandit)
2016	Pt. Dalchand Sharma	Pakhawaj Player
2017	Pt. Ulhas Kashalkar	Classical Vocalist (Jaipur gharana)
2018	Manju Mehta	Indian classical sitar player
2019	Pandit Vidyadhar Vyas	Indian Hindustani vocalist (Gwalior gharana)
2020	Satish Vyas	Santoor player
2021	Pt. Nityanand Haldipur	Flute maestro
2022	Pt. Ganapati Bhat Hasanagi	Indian Hindustani classical vocalist

== See also ==
- List of Indian classical music festivals
- Hindustani classical music
- Carnatic classical music
- Gwalior
- Madhya Pradesh
