= Sumati Mutatkar =

- Born: Sumati Amberdekar; 10 September 1916; Madhya Pradesh
- Died: 28 February 2007 (aged 90) Kolkata
- Genre: Hindustani classical music
- Occupations: vocalist, musicologist

Vidushi Sumati Mutatkar (10 September 1916 – 28 February 2007) was an Indian classical music vocalist and musicologist from the Agra gharana of Hindustani classical music, and a Professor of Department of Music in University of Delhi.

She was awarded the highest award of the Sangeet Natak Akademi, India's National Academy for Music, Dance and Drama, for lifetime achievement, the 1979 Sangeet Natak Akademi Fellowship and the Padma Shri in 1999, by Government of India. She was also awarded the Kalidas Samman by the Government of Madhya Pradesh in 2001-2002.

== Early life and training ==
She was born in Balaghat in the then province of C.P. and Berar, the oldest child of Gajanan Amberdekar, a judge, and Sundari Subedar.

She received training in Hindustani classical music from various teachers, including Pandit Rajabhaiya Poochwale of Gwalior gharana, Ustad Vilayat Hussain Khan of Agra gharana, and Pandit Anant Manohar Joshi and Ustad Mushtaq Hussain Khan (d. 1964) of the Rampur gharana. She was, however, primarily a student of Pandit S. N. Ratanjankar. at the Bhatkhande Music Institute—earlier known as the Marris College—in Lucknow.

== Career ==
In 1953, she joined as the Director of Music at the All India Radio (AIR) and subsequently became Deputy Chief Producer of Music. Later, in 1968 she joined the Faculty of Music and Fine Arts, at the Delhi University, eventually retiring in September 1981 as the Dean of the Faculty. During her tenure, she supervised numerous research programs in the field of music, as well published several books on the subject.

She died on 28 February 2007, at a private hospital in Kolkata, after a brief bronchial illness at the age of 91; she was survived by her daughter.

== Bibliography ==
- Shrikrishna Narayan Ratanjankar 'Sujan': a many splendoured genius. Lotus Collection, 2001. ISBN 81-7436-175-8.
- Geet Nijhari : Sumit Mutakar Rachit Bandisho Ka Sangrah ( Hindi) . Kanishka Publishiners, 2002.
- Aspects of Indian music. Sangeet Natak Akademi, 2006. ISBN 81-7871-096-X.
- Sumati-Sangitabharanam: Gems of Indian Music and Musicology (Prof. Sumati Mutatkar Felicitation Volume), by Abha Kulshreshtha, Sumati Mutatkar, Jagdish Sahai. 1994. ISBN 81-85268-31-2.
