= Akram Ahmad =

Indian pharmacist

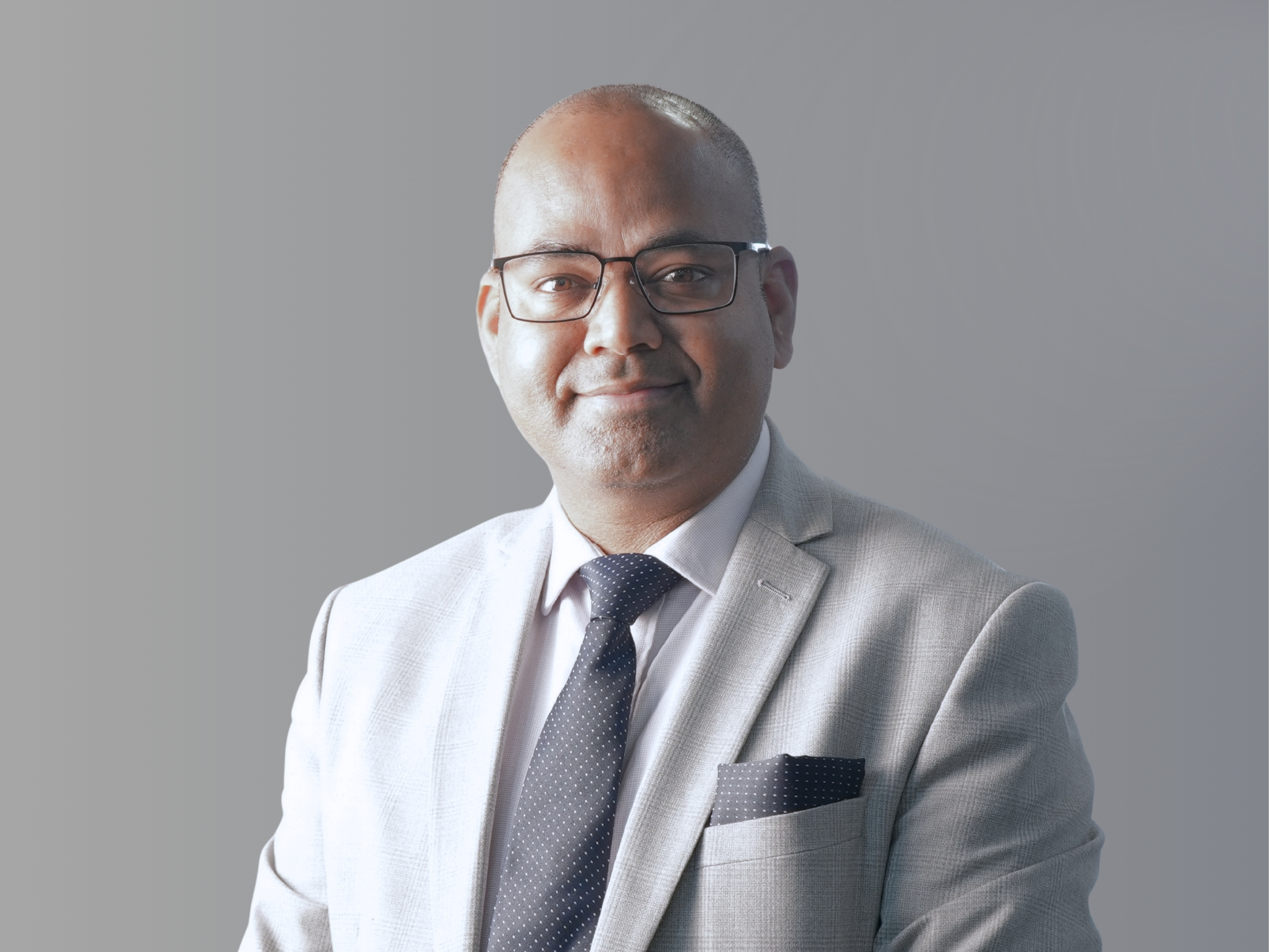
- Born: Sahaswan, Budaun district, Uttar Pradesh, India
- Education: Allahabad Agricultural Institute, University of Sydney Faculty of Medicine and Health
- Occupations: pharmacist, and academic
- Known for: Academically Global

Akram Ahmad is an Indian pharmacist, academic, and entrepreneur and founder and CEO of Academically Global, an EdTech platform that helps healthcare professionals prepare for licensing exams and work opportunities abroad. His work focuses on bridging the gap between healthcare education in India and global employment standards.

== Early life and education ==
Ahmad was born in Sahaswan, a small town in the Budaun district, Uttar Pradesh, in a rural family. He had an ordinary upbringing residing in a single room house with his six siblings. Inspired by his family ambitions and motivated by his elder brother, who was a pharmacist too, he opted to study pharmacy.

He pursued his Diploma in Pharmacy followed by BPharm at Allahabad Agricultural Institute from 2007 to 2010. Subsequently, he pursued his Doctor of Pharmacy (Pharm D) from Annamalai University in Tamil Nadu. During this time, a talk with an American visiting speaker opened his eyes to global career options in the field of healthcare, marking a turning point in his life.

== Career ==
Ahmad began his career in academia. His first permanent appointment was as a lecturer at UCSI University in Kuala Lumpur, Malaysia, from 2014 to 2017. He was later awarded a full government scholarship to continue his PhD work at the University of Sydney, Australia.

During his stay in Sydney, he encountered some very well-qualified healthcare professionals who were underutilized because they lacked information regarding local licensing exams. This prompted him to launch a YouTube channel in 2018 focused on sharing advice on how international health professionals can get licensed to practice in nations such as Australia, Canada, and the United States of America.

== Academically global ==
In 2022, Ahmad established Academically Global to offer systematic online training for licensing exams like KAPS (now called OPRA), AMC, PEBC, NCLEX, and more. The firm expanded expeditiously, serving more than 3,000 students across 70+ countries. In two years of establishment, it achieved an annual turnover of ₹12 crore and established offices in Dehradun, India, and Sydney, Australia.

In January 2026, Ahmad launched Jobslly, a healthcare-focused career and recruitment platform under Academically Global, designed to bridge gaps in the employment ecosystem for healthcare professionals.

== Personal life ==
Ahmad married Syed Asna, a software engineer, in 2019. During the early stages of Academically Global, his wife supported the company, both financially and technically. Despite the business success, Ahmad has stated in interviews that he prefers to live simply and continues to follow the values taught by his parents.

== Views on healthcare education ==
Ahmad has been vocal about the gaps in India's healthcare education system. He has pointed out that many Indian degrees in pharmacy and medicine are not fully recognised abroad, often due to differences in programme duration or curriculum focus.

He advocates for reforms to align Indian healthcare education with global standards, including a stronger emphasis on clinical training and communication skills.

== Notable publications ==
- "Knowledge and attitude of healthcare workers about middle east respiratory syndrome in multispecialty hospitals of Qassim, Saudi Arabia; Muhammad Umair Khan, Shahjahan Shah, Akram Ahmad, Omotayo Fatokun; December 2014; Vol-14; Cited by 317
- "Perceptions and Practices of Community Pharmacists towards Antimicrobial Stewardship in the State of Selangor, Malaysia; 2016; Dhingra S. Khan MU, Hassali MAA, Ahmad A, Elkalmi RM, Zaidi STR; Vol-11; Cited by 93
- Knowledge, attitudes and perceptions towards polio immunization among residents of two highly affected regions of Pakistan; 2015; Jawaria Idrees and Muhammad Ubaid Khan Muhammad Umair Khan, Akram Ahmad, Talieha Aqeel, Saad Salman, Qamer Ibrahim; Journal:BMC Public Health; Cited by 93
- "The Role of Religion, Spirituality and Fasting in Coping with Diabetes among Indian Migrants in Australia: A Qualitative Exploratory Study"; 6 October 2021; Akram Ahmad, Muhammad Umair Khan & Parisa Aslani; Citations:14
- "A Qualitative Study on Medication Taking Behaviour Among People With Diabetes in Australia"; 20 September 2021; Vol:12; Akram Ahmad, Muhammad Umair Khan, Parisa Aslani; Cited by 12
