= Rajendra Prasanna =

Indian classical flautist

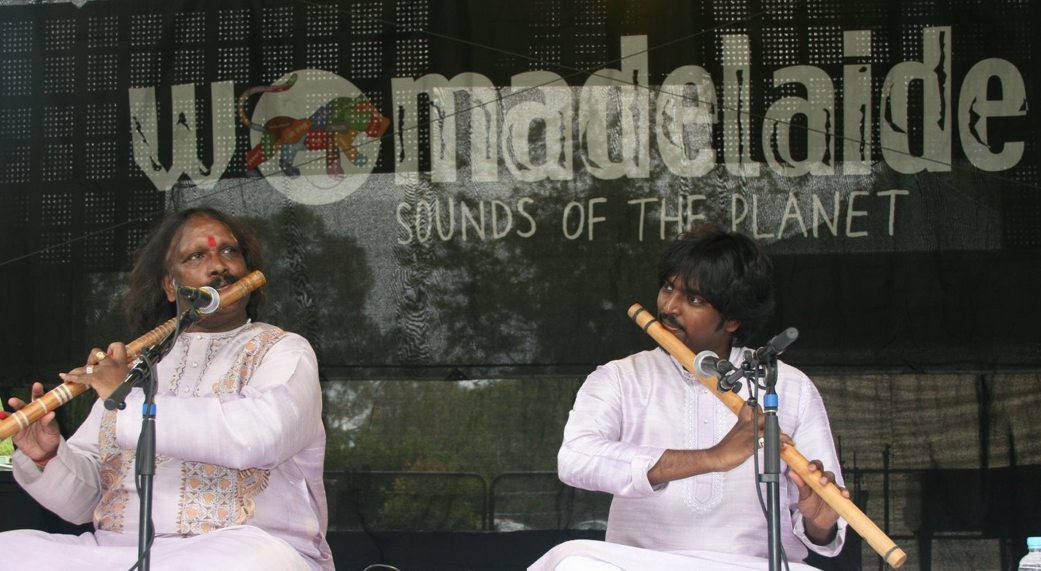
- Rajendra Prasanna playing at Womad festival Australia

Background information
- Born: 15 April 1956 (age 70); Varanasi, Uttar Pradesh, India
- Genre: Indian classical music
- Occupations: Instrumentalist, composer
- Instruments: Bansuri, shehnai

Rajendra Prasanna (राजेन्द्र प्रसन्ना; born 15 April 1956) is an Indian classical flautist and shehnai (Indian oboe) player from Benares Gharana. Pandit Rajendra Prasanna is regarded as a foremost exponent of both the bansuri and the shehnai, two wind instruments with contrasting textures and distinct performance traditions.

== Gurus and training ==
Rajendra Prasanna received his initial musical training within the Prasanna family under the guidance of his father, Raghunath Prasanna, and his uncles, Pandit Bholanath Prasanna and Pandit Vishnu Prasanna. After his family moved to Delhi, he underwent guidance under Hafeez Ahmed Khan and Sarfaraz Hussain Khan of the Rampur–Sahaswan gharana. He also learnt the nuances of the Banaras semi-classical tradition under Pandit Mahadev Prasad Mishra.

== Family heritage and legacy ==
Although the family was historically associated with the shehnai, Raghunath Prasanna introduced the bansuri into the family's musical tradition. He developed a distinctive flute style that incorporated techniques derived from shehnai playing together with elements of Hindustani vocal music, establishing the foundation of the Prasanna family's bansuri tradition, which continued through later generations.

== Performances ==
He performed at the Edinburgh Festival (UK), Sydney Opera House, WOMAD Festival (Australia, New Zealand), World Music festival for the golden jubilee celebration for India's Independence held in America, Canada and Switzerland (U.N.O. Headquarters) in 1997, Concert for George in London (Ravi Shankar project), Opera de Lyon in France, Philharmonie de Paris in France, and Elbphilharmonie Hamburg in Germany.

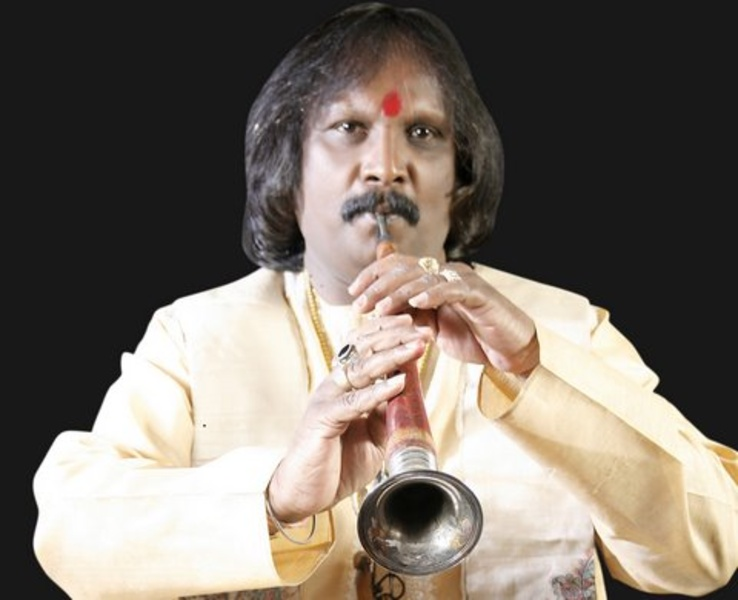
Rajendra Prasanna playing shehnai

== Awards and honors ==
- Sangeet Natak Akademi Award - Hindustani Instrumental - Flute / Shehnai 2017.

== Discography ==
- Indian Classical Music by Rajendra Prasanna - T-Series
- Flute Fantasy
- Colors of life
- Tribute to Pt. Raghunath Prasanna
- Nirmal Sangeet
- Ghoomar
- Enchanting of Himalayas
- A tribute to Ustad Bismillah Khan (Shehnai) - 2006
