= Arun Bhaduri =

- Born: 7 October 1943
- Origin: Murshidabad, West Bengal, India
- Died: 17 December 2018 (aged 75)
- Genres: Hindustani classical music, Semi classical music, Devotional, Thumri
- Occupation: Vocalist
- Years active: 1950–2018

Arun Bhaduri (7 October 1943 – 17 December 2018) was a vocalist of Indian Classical music.

Bhaduri took talim at first from A. Daud Khan and Sagiruddin Khan. Later he joined ITC Sangeet Research Academy as a scholar and trained with Ishtiaq Hussain Khan of the Rampur-Sahaswan Gharana and Jnan Prakash Ghosh. In early life his musical companions were tabla player Nitya Gopal Saha, vocalist Amalendu Lahiri, musician Ramprasad Maitra etc.

Bhaduri received the Banga Bibhushan Samman in 2014.

== Death ==
Arun Bhaduri was suffering from chronic obstructive pulmonary disease and died in the hospital in Kolkata on 17 December 2018, at the age of 75.
