= Naina Devi (singer) =

Indian musician (1917–1993)

- Born: Nilina Sen; 27 September 1917; Kolkata, British India
- Died: 1 November 1993 (aged 76) Calcutta
- Genre: Hindustani classical
- Occupations: Vocalist; music producer; artistic director
- Years active: 1950–1993

Naina Devi (27 September 1917 – 1 November 1993) also known as Naina Ripjit Singh, was Indian vocalist of Hindustani classical music, most known for her thumri renditions, though she also sang dadra and ghazals. She was a music producer at All India Radio and later with Doordarshan. She started her musical training under Girja Shankar Chakravarty in her teens, later restarted it with Ustad Mushtaq Hussain Khan of Rampur-Sahaswan gharana and Rasoolan Bai of Benaras gharana, in the 1950s. Born in an aristocratic family in Kolkata, she was married into the royal family of Kapurthala State at age 16, and was started singing in concerts only after her husband died in 1949, and she moved to Delhi.

In 1974, she was awarded the Padma Shri, the fourth highest civilian honour given by Government of India.

== Early life and training ==
Born Nilina Sen, in an aristocratic Bengali family in Kolkata, where her grandfather was Keshub Chandra Sen, nationalist leader and social reformer from the Brahmo Samaj movement. One of five siblings: (Sunit, Binita, Sadhona, Nilina and Pradip), Nilina received a liberal upbringing from their parents Saral Chandra Sen, a barrister and Nirmala (Nellie). She first got interested in music, when her uncle, Panchu took young Nilina to a concert of Angurbala, at a local theatre. Thereafter, she went to listen to Agurbala at her home in Masjid Bari Street. Eventually she trained for nine years under Girija Shankar Chakravarty (1885–1948), noted vocalist and teacher, known for revitalising the khayal tradition in Bengal.

In 1934, at the age of 16, she married Ripjit Singh (1906- 1953), third son of Raja Charanjit Singh of princely Kapurthala State. After her marriage she moved to Kapurthala in Punjab and wasn't allowed to sing. Though her husband died in 1953, when she was 32 years of age.

== Career ==
After the death of husband in 1953, she moved to Delhi, where she spent the rest of her life. Here she came in touch with Sumitra Charat Ram, an arts patron and wife of Lala Charat Ram of DCM Shriram Group, who then ran Jhankar Committee, a small performing arts organisation in Delhi, which paved way for the establishment of Shriram Bharatiya Kala Kendra in 1952, with Devi as its artistic director. In the following years, she also remained a music producer of All India Radio, Delhi, and producer with state-run Doordarshan TV channel. Meanwhile, after arriving in Delhi, she started her musical training once again, first under Ustad Mushtaq Hussain Khan (died 1964), the doyen of Rampur-Sahaswan gharana, who was then teacher at the Bhartiya Kala Kendra, and later under Rasoolan Bai of Benaras gharana, where she learned the purab ang style of Thumri, and started performing although under the name, Naina Devi.

In her Thumri singing, she stressed on the need to study Nayika Bheda (Ashta Nayika), the eight different kind of heroines classified in the Natya Shastra, to render thumri effectively. Though she also sang in other genres like qawwali and ghazal.

Later in life, she got interested in the traditional form of kirtan, she went to Vrindavan and learnt it and subsequently trained three of her senior disciples in the form.

She also taught notable disciples like Shubha Mudgal, Madhumita Ray and Vidya Rao. In 2011, one of her disciples, Vidya Rao wrote a memoir about her titled, Heart to Heart: Remembering Naina Devi.

== Personal life ==
She has four children, two sons, Ratanjit Singh (b.1940), Karanjit Singh (born 1945), and two daughters Nilika Kaur (born 1935) and Rena Kaur (born 1938), who founded the Naina Devi Foundation in 1994. Her elder sister, Sadhana Bose (1911–1973) was a noted dancer and film actress of the 1930s and 40s. Her other sister Rani Binita Roy was married into the royal family of Chakma. Naina Devi's two paternal aunts were dowager Maharanis of two well known princely states of India. Suniti Devi, Maharani of Cooch Behar, queen consort of Nripendra Narayan Bhup Bahadur, Maharaja of Cooch Behar. Maharani Suniti Devi's son Jitendra Narayan Bhup Bahadur, Maharaja of Cooch Behar married princess Indira Raje Gaekwad of Braoda, only daughter of Sayajirao Gaekwad, Maharaja of Baroda. Jitendra Narayan and Indira Devi's second daughter Gayatri Devi, Maharani of Jaipur was the most well known Indian royal face in her lifetime. The other aunt of Naina Devi was Suchrau Devi, Maharani of Mayurbhanj, queen consort of Ram Chandra Bhanj Deo, Maharaja of Mayurbhanj.

== Published works ==
- Mushtaq Hussain Khan (Biography), by Naina Ripjit Singh. Sangeet Natak Akademi, 1964.
- Thumri, Its Development and Gayeki, Journal, Volume 6, Issue 1. ITC Sangeet Research Academy.1985. pp. 13–17.

== Bibliography ==
- Peter Lamarche Manuel (1989). Ṭhumri: In Historical and Stylistic Perspectives. Motilal Banarsidass. ISBN 8120806735.
- Vidya Rao (2011). Heart to Heart: Remembering Naina Devi. HarperCollins. ISBN 978-9350291474.
- Kumar Pradas Mukherji (2006). The Lost World of Hindustani Music. Penguin Books India. ISBN 0143061992.
