= Satish Vyas (musician) =

Indian santoor player (born 1952)

- Born: November 16, 1952 (age 73)
- Genres: Hindustani classical music
- Occupation: musician
- Instrument: Santoor
- Years active: 1992-present
- Website: satishvyas.in

Satish Vyas (born November 16, 1952) is an Indian santoor player. He is the son of the Indian classical singer C. R. Vyas. From 1978 he studied santoor with Shivkumar Sharma. He lives in Chembur.

== Performances ==
Pandit Satish Vyas has performed all over the world at prestigious venues. Most recently, he performed at the Aga Khan Museum in Toronto, Canada in 2019 for the Raag-Mala Music Society of Toronto.

== Awards ==
- Padma Shri
- Tansen Samman, 26 December 2020
