= Ghulam Sadiq Khan =

Indian classical vocalist

Ustad Ghulam Sadiq Khan
- Born: 22 August 1939
- Origin: Kanpur, India
- Died: 15 May 2016 (aged 76)
- Genres: Hindustani classical music
- Occupation: Vocalist

Ghulam Sadiq Khan
- Awards: Padma Shri award by the Government of India in 2005

Ustad Ghulam Sadiq Khan (22 August 1939 – 15 May 2016) was an Indian classical vocalist. He belonged to the Rampur-Sahaswan gharana.

== Musical career ==
He was initiated into music at the age of nine by his father Ustad Ghulam Jafar Khan, who was an Indian sarangi player. Later, he continued his training under the guidance of Ustad Mushtaq Hussain Khan, who was the first recipient of the Padma Bhushan award in India.

He specialized in the khayal gayaki and also sang thumri, dadra and bhajans. He performed in India and abroad, including the UK, Australia, Saudi Arabia, Oman, Mauritius, Singapore, Hong Kong, Indonesia, Thailand, China and Afghanistan. He was a top graded artist of All India Radio and Doordarshan.

During the course of his career, he taught many disciples, including his son, Ustad Ghulam Abbas Khan who is a khayal and ghazal vocalist, and Jaspinder Narula, a Bollywood playback singer. He also taught his grandson Ghulam Hasan Khan, who is also a Hindustani classical vocalist. He worked as a senior lecturer for the 'Faculty of Music' at the University of Delhi.

== Awards and recognition ==
In 2005, he received the Padma Shri award for his contribution to Indian classical music.

== Death ==
Ustad Ghulam Sadiq Khan died on 15 May 2016 due to a heart attack at Max Healthcare, New Delhi at age 76.
