= Rajyotsava Awards (2016) =

Awards given by the government of Karnataka, India

2016 Rajyotsava Awards
- Date: 1 November 2016
- Location: Ravindra Kalakshetra, Bangalore
- Country: India
- Presented by: Government of Karnataka
- Winners: See list

The 2016 Rajyotsava Awards ceremony took place at the Ravindra Kalakshetra on 1 November 2016. Awarded annually by the government of Karnataka, the ceremony saw 61 individuals being awarded for achievements in various fields. The number was chosen to mark the 61st anniversary of the formation of the State of Karnataka.

== List of awardees ==
The selection committee adhered to the yardstick of minimum age of 60 while selecting individuals for the awards. However, norms were relaxed in the field of sports and social sector.

Winners:

=== Individual ===
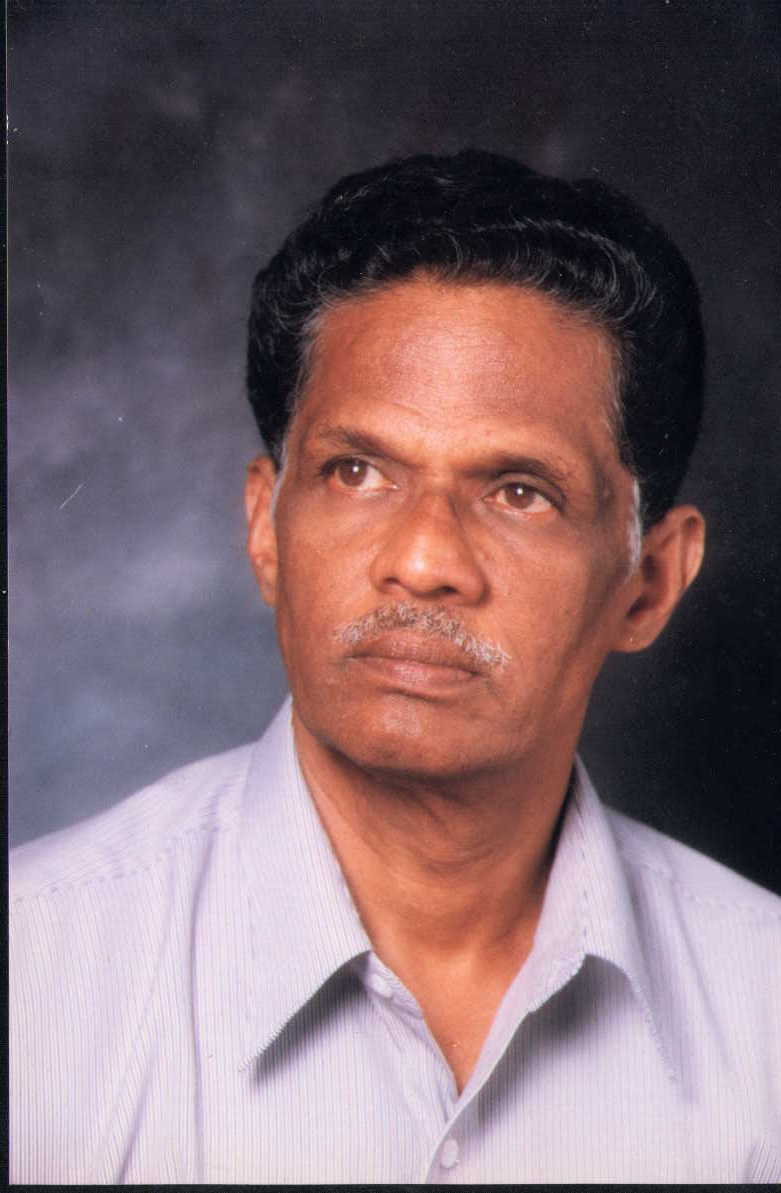
Writer K. T. Gatti, one of the winners

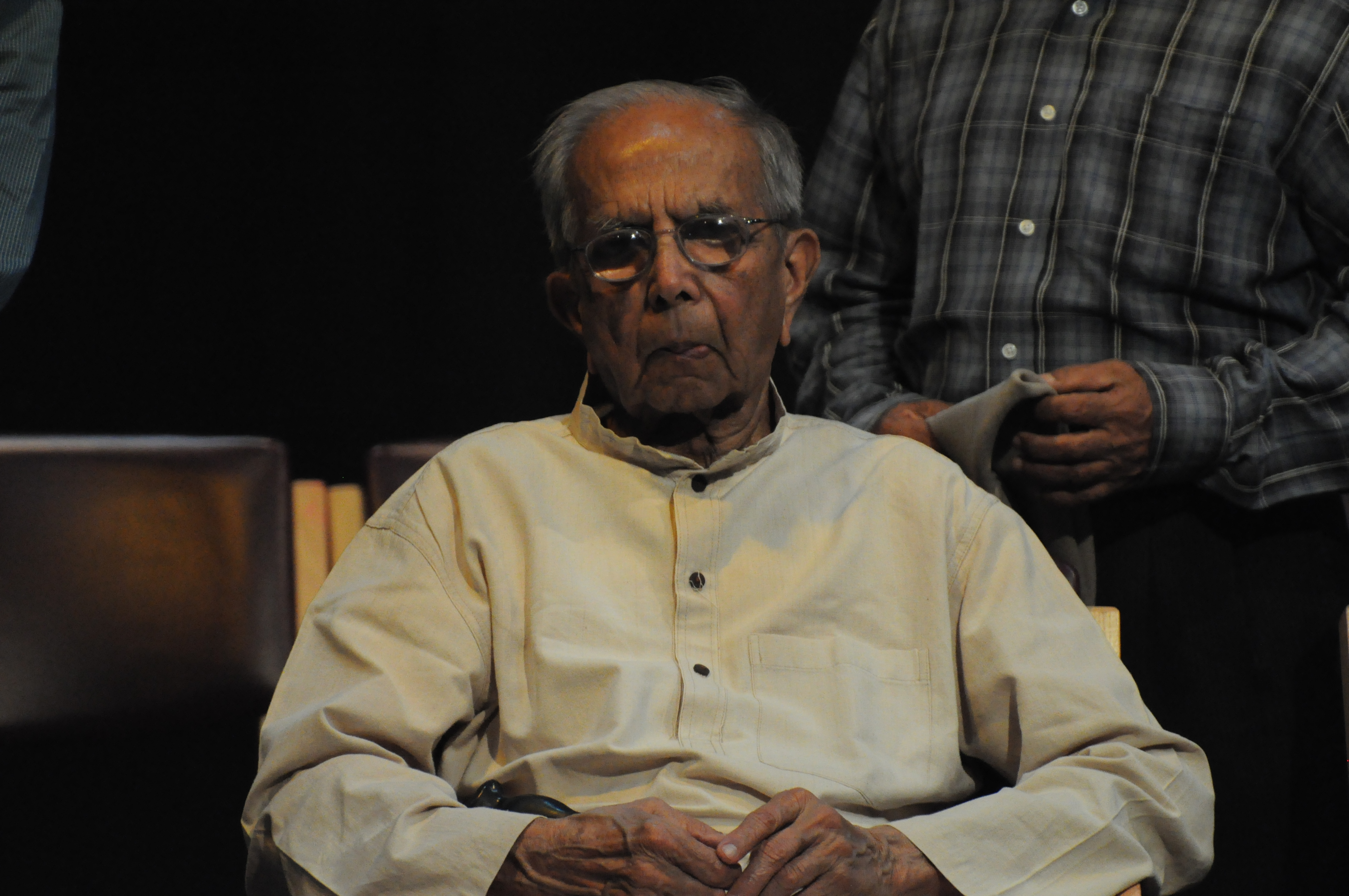
J.R.Lakshmanarao

Awardee	Area of expertise	Highlights
Justice Shivaraj Patil	Judiciary	Supreme court judge.
K. T. Gatti	Literature	Author of 90 books in Kannada and English. He authored 45 novels, 19 plays, 9 anthologies of short stories, and many essays and poems.
Bezwada Wilson	Activism	Activist and National convenor of National Convenor of the Safai Karmachari Andolan (SKA). He started a grassroots movement to eradicate manual scavenging in India.
Lakshmi	Film and television	Actress
Moulasab Imamsab Sadaf	Theatre	
T. H. Hemalatha	Theatre	
Rameshwari Verma	Theatre	
Umarani Barigidada	Theatre	
Chandrakumar Singh	Theatre	
Revathi Kalyan Kumar	Film and television	
Srinivasa Murthy	Film and television	
Sa. Ra. Govindu	Film and television	President of Karnataka Film Chamber of Commerce
Syed Satyajith	Film and television	
K Muralidhar Rao	Music and dance	
Dwaraki Krishnaswamy	Music and dance	
Hemavathamma	Music and dance	
Pandit Narayana Dage	Music and dance	
V. G. Mahapurush	Music and dance	
Thimmamma	Folklore	
Sharadamma	Folklore	
Mallaiah Hidikal	Folklore	
Sanna Birappa Kariyavar	Folklore	
Sabhitha Kambrekar	Folklore	
Chikka Marigowda	Folklore	
M. R. Ranganath Rao	Yakshagana	
Petri Madhav Nayak	Yakshagana	
Kinnigoli Mukhyaprana Shettigar	Yakshagana	
Sujathamma	Yakshagana	
D. J. Lavani	Yakshagana	
Dhruva Ramachandra Pattar	Art and Sculpture	
Kashinath Shilpi	Art and Sculpture	
Basavaraj L. Jane	Art and Sculpture	
Parvathamma Kowdi	Art and Sculpture	
Tulasamma Kelur	Social Service	
G. M. Muniyappa	Social Service	
Somanna Hedge Devanakote	Social Service	Tribal rights activist
Nazeer Ahmed	Social Service	
L. C. Soans	Agriculture/Environment	
G. K. Veeresh	Agriculture/Environment	
K. Puttannaiah	Agriculture/Environment	
M. A. Khadri	Agriculture/Environment	
M. M. Mannur	Media	
Bhavani Lakshminarayana	Media	
Ishwara Daithota	Media	
Indudhara Honnapura	Media	
J. R. Lakshmana Rao	Science/Environment	Science writer
K. Muniyappa	Science/Environment	
Hebri Subhash Krishna Ballal	Medicine	
Surjith Singh	Sports	
S. V. Sunil	Sports	
Krishna Naikodi Amoghappa	Sports	
Tejaswi Kattimani	Education	
R. S. Lokapura	Literature	
B. Shyam Sundar	Literature	
Sukanya Maruthi	Literature	
Mahadev Shivabasappa Patana	Freedom fighter	106-year-old freedom fighter from Belagavi. He represented Ramdurg in the Karnataka Legislative Assembly in 1957. Participated in the Quit India Movement and the Karnataka unification movement. He led the agitation to free Ramdurg from the British. A reward of ₹10,000 was announced by the British to catch him dead or alive. He was a follower of Sardar Vallabhbhai Patel.
M. N. Vali	Other fields	
R. Jaiprasad	Other fields	
Shakunthala Narasimhan	Other fields	
Devaraj Reddy	Other fields	Hydro-geologist

=== Organisations/Associations ===
Sl.No	Awardee	Area of expertise	Location	Highlights
1	Team YUVAA	NGO	Bidar	
