= Rampur–Sahaswan gharana =

Genre in Hindustani classical music

Rampur–Sahaswan gharana is a gharana (musical heritage) of Hindustani classical music centred in the North-Uttar Pradesh towns of Rampur and Sahaswan.

Ustad Inayat Hussain Khan (1849–1919) was the founder of this gharana.

== History ==
The gharana finds its origins in Mehboob Khan, the chief khayal singer in the royal court of Rampur State (in present Uttar Pradesh), his tradition was followed by his son Inayat Hussain Khan (1849–1919) and in turn by Inyat's brothers-in-law, Haider Khan (1857–1927), Ustad Fida Hussain Khan and Padma Bhushan Ustad Mushtaq Hussain Khan (1878–1964; first recipient of the Padma Bhushan Award), thus all the singers were connected with each other, and the gharana was named after their ancestral place, Sahaswan, in present Badaun district. Amongst the most famous and relevant vocalists of the Gharana are Mushtaq Hussain Khan, Nisar Hussain Khan, Ghulam Mustafa Khan, Ghulam Sadiq Khan and Rashid Khan.

Inayat Hussain Khan was a child prodigy. He first married the daughter of Haddu Khan of the Gwalior gharana.

== Singing style ==
The Rampur-Sahaswan gayaki (style of singing) is closely related to the Gwalior Gharana, which features medium-slow tempos, a full-throated voice and intricate rhythmic play. The gharana style is also known for the diversity and intricacy of the taans (rapid-fire elaborations), as well as tarana singing.

Renowned singers of this gharana include the first and, perhaps the foremost disciple of Inayat Hussain Khan, Haider Khan. Khan and his family played a vital role in taking forward the legacy of this family. His son Fida Hussain Khan and his grandson Nisar Hussain Khan continued the tradition.

Nisar Hussain Khan was a teacher whose disciples include vocalists Ghulam Mustafa Khan, Rashid Khan, Hafeez Ahmed Khan. Mushtaq Hussain Khan was a disciple of Haider Khan and was later groomed by Inayat Hussain Khan. He was the recipient of the first Padma Bhushan award in singing.

The gharana is represented by two interrelated families - the direct descendants of Inayat Hussain Khan and his other relatives and disciples.

In 2006, Dr Sakuntala Narasimhan, herself a disciple of Hafeez Ahmed Khan, published a book on the Rampur–Sahaswan gharana titled The Splendour of Rampur-Sahaswan Gharana.

== Exponents ==
=== 19th Century ===
- Karim Bux, grandfather of Mushtaq Hussain Khan
- Rahim Bux, grandfather of Inayat Hussain Khan
- Mehboob Khan, father and guru of Inayat Hussain Khan
- Ali Bux, father and guru of Haider Khan
- Inayat Hussain Khan (1849–1919), son and disciple of Mehboob Khan Bakhsh and Haddu Khan of Gwalior.
- Haider Khan (1857–1927), son and disciple of Ali Bux Khan.
- Mushtaq Hussain Khan (1878–1964), son and disciple of Kallan Khan. Also learned from older brother, Ashiq Hussain Khan, father-in-law Inayat Hussain Khan.

=== 20th Century ===
- Fida Hussain Khan (1883–1948), son and disciple of Haider Khan
- Nisar Hussain Khan (1906–1993), son and disciple of Fida Hussain Khan
- Ishtiaq Hussain Khan (1914–1980), son and disciple of Mushtaq Hussain Khan
- Ishaq Hussain (d. 1981), son and disciple of Mushtaq Hussain Khan
- Ghulam Abid Khan, son and disciple of Mushtaq Hussain Khan
- Sumati Mutatkar (1916–2007), disciple of Mushtaq Hussain Khan
- Naina Devi (1917–1993), disciple of Mushtaq Hussain Khan
- Bhimsen Joshi (1922–2011), disciple of Mushtaq Hussain Khan; more associated with Kirana Gharana
- Hafeez Ahmed Khan (1926–2006), son and disciple of Rashid Ahmed Khan. Also learned from Mushtaq Hussain Khan
- Shanno Khurana (b. 1927), disciple of Mushtaq Hussain Khan
- Ghulam Mustafa Khan (1931–2021), son and disciple of Waris Hussain Khan. Also learned from father-in-law, Mushtaq Hussain Khan.
- Ghulam Hussain Khan (b. 1936), son and disciple of Mushtaq Hussain Khan
- Sulochana Brahaspati (b. 1937), disciple of Mushtaq Hussain Khan
- Mujahid Hussain Khan (b. 1938), son and disciple of Sarfaraz Hussain Khan
- Sarfaraz Hussain Khan (1938–1999), son and disciple of Nissar Hussain Khan
- Ghulam Sadiq Khan (1939–2016), son and disciple of Ghulam Jaffar Khan, son-in-law and disciple of Mushtaq Hussain Khan
- Ghulam Taqi Khan (1940–1990), son and disciple of Mushtaq Hussain Khan
- Arun Bhaduri (1943–2018), disciple of Ishtiaq Hussain Khan

=== 21st Century ===
- Ghulam Fariduddin Khan (b. 1950), son and disciple of Ishtiaq Hussain Khan
- Zulfikar Hussain Khan (b. 1954), son and disciple of Nissar Hussain Khan
- Ghulam Naqi Khan (b, 1964), son and disciple of Ghulam Taqi Khan
- Ghulam Abbas Khan, son and disciple of Ghulam Sadiq Khan
- Rashid Khan (1968–2024), disciple of uncle Ghulam Mustafa Khan and grandfather Nissar Hussain Khan
- Tushar Dutta (b. 1969), disciple of Arun Bhaduri
- Ghulam Hasan Khan (b. 1994), son and disciple of Ghulam Abbas Khan
- Armaan Khan (b. c. 2005), son and disciple of Rashid Khan

== Bibliography ==
- Kumar Pradas Mukherji (2006). The Lost World of Hindustani Music. Penguin Books India. ISBN 0143061992.
- Sakuntala Narasimhan (2006). The splendour of Rampur-sahaswan gharana of Hindustani music, its evolution, history, characteristics and compositions. Veenapani Centre for Arts.
- Naina Ripjit Singh (Naina Devi) (1964). Mushtaq Hussain Khan. Sangeet Natak Akademi.
- Bonnie C Wade (1984). Khyāl: Creativity Within North India's Classical Music Tradition. Cambridge University Press Archive. ISBN 0521256593.
