= Mushtaq Hussain Khan =

Indian Hindustani classical vocalist (1878–1964)

Ustad Mushtaq Hussain Khan
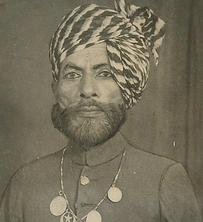

Background information
- Also known as: Sher-e-Mausiqi
- Born: 1878; Sahaswan, North-Western Provinces, British India
- Origin: Sahaswan, Budaun District, Uttar Pradesh, India
- Died: 13 August 1964 (aged 85–86) Delhi, India
- Genres: Indian classical music
- Occupation: Vocalist
- Years active: 1896 — 1964
- Label: Saregama

Ustad Mushtaq Hussain Khan (1878 – 13 August 1964) was an Indian classical vocalist. He belonged to the Rampur-Sahaswan gharana.

== Early life ==
Mushtaq Hussain was born in a family of traditional musicians in Sahaswan, a small town in Budaun District of Uttar Pradesh. It is where he grew up and spent his boyhood.

Music came to him quite early in life. He was only 10 when his father, Ustad Kallan Khan, began giving him regular lessons, or rather introduced him into this art.

Mushtaq Hussain Khan was twelve when he became a disciple of Ustad Haider Khan and went with him to Kathmandu, Nepal. He then began taking minimal music training from Haider Khan. After two years, Mushtaq Hussain came under the tutelage of Ustad Inayat Hussain Khan, the founder of Rampur-Sahaswan gharana. Collectively, he spent eighteen years of his life with his trainer, Inayat Hussain Khan.

== Musical career ==
Mushtaq Hussain, at the age of thirty-five, was enlisted as one of the court musicians in Rampur. Later, he became the chief court musician of Rampur. In the 1920s, when the vogue of music conferences started in India, Mushtaq Hussain was invited to participate in them. In addition, he started performing on All India Radio.

== Disciples ==
During his long career, Mushtaq Hussain Khan trained many disciples including Bharat Ratna Pandit Bhimsen Joshi, Padma Bhushan Smt. Shanno Khurana, his son-in-law Padma Shri Ustad Ghulam Sadiq Khan, Padma Shri Smt. Naina Devi, Smt. Sulochana Brahaspati, Padma Shri Smt. Sumati Mutatkar, Ustad Afzal Hussain Khan Nizami, as well as his own sons.

== Awards and achievements ==
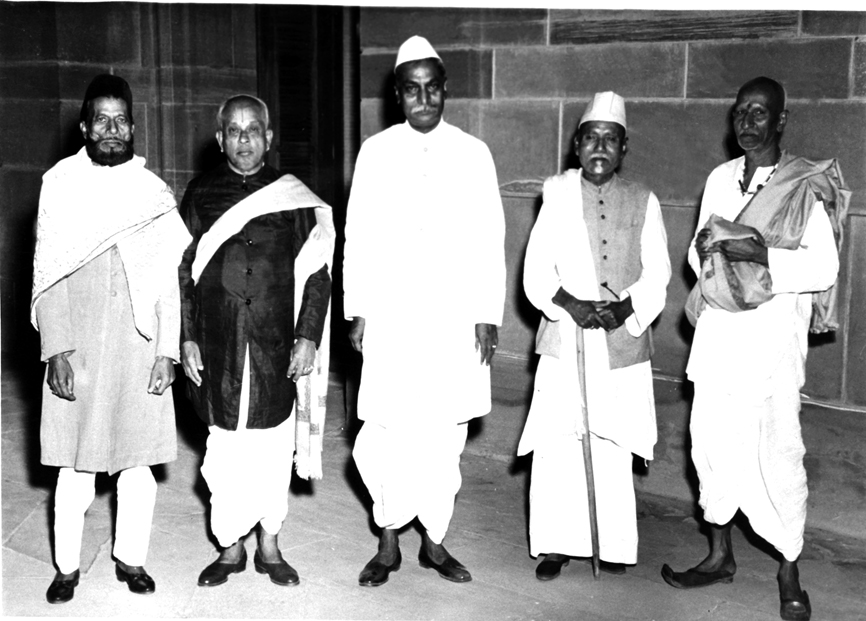
Mushtaq Hussain Khan, Ariyakudi Ramanuja Iyengar, Allauddin Khan and Karaikudi Sambasiva Iyer with the First President of India, Rajendra Prasad at the Rashtrapati Bhavan on March 20, 1952.

- When the Government of India decided to honour outstanding exponents of the arts, he was the first vocalist to receive the Rashtrapati Award in 1952.
- He was also the first recipient of the Sangeet Natak Akademi award in 1952.
- In 1956, he retired from Rampur and joined the Shriram Bharatiya Kala Kendra, New Delhi the following year and became the first Indian classical vocalist to receive the Padma Bhushan in 1957.

== Discography ==
- "Great Master, Great Music" (An All India Radio Recording)
- "Khayal Gunkari" (All India Radio)
- "Khayal & Tarana-Bihag" (All India Radio)
- "Rampur Sahaswan Gharana"
- "Classic Gold - Rare Gems"
- "Classic Gold"

== Death ==
Mushtaq Hussain's last concert was at the residence of Naina Devi, where he had a cardiac arrest, and was brought to Irwin Hospital in Old Delhi, where he was declared dead on arrival. He died on 13 August 1964.

== See also ==
- List of Padma Bhushan award recipients (1954–59)
