= Khairagarh =

Khairagarh may refer to:

- Khairagarh (city), in the Indian state of Chhattisgarh
- Khairagarh State, a former princely state of India
