= ITC Sangeet Research Academy =

Hindustani classical music academy

- Abbreviation: ITCSRA
- Formation: 1977
- Purpose: Hindustani classical music education, research and archives
- Location: 1, Netaji Subash Chandra Bose Road, Tollygunge, Kolkata - 700 040
- Website: Official site

ITC Sangeet Research Academy is a Hindustani classical music academy run by the corporate house, ITC Ltd. It is located in Kolkata, India.

Noted musicians associated with the academy include Ulhas Kashalkar, Ajoy Chakrabarty, Subhra Guha, Uday Bhawalkar, Brajeswar Mukherjee, Omkar Dadarkar and Abir Hossain. Noted alumni of the academy include Rashid Khan, Ajoy Chakrabarty and Kaushiki Chakraborty.

== History ==
The association of ITC to music began with the ITC Sangeet Sammelan held in Delhi in 1971. The sammelan featuring the luminaries of Indian Classical Music created quite a stir in the capital city. Thus, ITC decided to patronize Indian Classical Music which led to the formation of the Sangeet Research Academy in 1977. The aim was to establish a modern gurukul and promote the age-old Guru-Shishya Parampara.

The maestros of Indian Classical Music who joined as the faculty members of the academy were Nisar Hussain Khan (Rampur-Sahaswan gharana), Hirabai Barodekar (Kirana gharana), Ishtiaq Hussain Khan (Rampur Gharana), Nivrittibua Sarnaik (Atrauli-Jaipur gharana), Girija Devi (Benaras gharana), Latafat Hussain Khan (Agra gharana). Instrumental training in the academy was introduced in 2002. The department was headed by Buddhadev Dasgupta who was the member of the expert committee for a long time.

The academy presently runs as a public charitable trust under the professional management of the board of trustees. The aims and objectives of the academy are creating an effective training system, rationalizing traditional data through modern research techniques and preservation of music.

== Annual festival ==
ITC Sangeet Research Academy organizes a classical music festival, the ITC Sangeet Sammelan, every year. In 2025, at the 54th ITC Sangeet Sammelan 2025, held in December 2025, classical music singer Parween Sultana was conferred the prestigious ITC Sangeet Samman, its Lifetime Achievement Award. Many prominent classical musicians including Ajoy Chakrabarty, Ulhas Kashalkar, Ashwini Deshpande, Subhra Guha, Uday Bhawalkar were in attendance at this event.
