= Inayat Hussain Khan =

Indian classical music vocalist (1849-1919)

- Born: c. 1849; Sahaswan, North-Western Provinces, British India
- Died: 1919 (aged 69–70)
- Occupation: Classical Vocalist
- Musical career
- Origin: Sahaswan, Mughal Empire, India
- Genres: Hindustani classical music, Rampur-Sahaswan gharana

Inayat Hussain Khan (1849–1919) was an Indian classical music vocalist, and the founder of the Rampur-Sahaswan gharana.

== Early life ==
Inayat Hussain Khan first married the daughter of Haddu Khan of the Gwalior gharana.

== Career ==
His singing style has influences of the Dhrupad singing typical of the Gwalior gharana, and the Rampur-Sahaswan style is sometimes regarded as an offshoot of the Gwalior gharana. His compositions later were made famous by his two sons-in-law, Mushtaq Hussain Khan and Nisar Hussain Khan.
