= Tarana =

Type of composition in Hindustani classical vocal music

Coordinates: 23°19′48″N 76°01′48″E

Tarana is a type of composition in Hindustani classical vocal music in which certain words (e.g. "odani", "todani", "tadeem" and "yalali") based on Persian and Arabic phonemes are rendered at a medium (madhya laya) or fast (drut laya) rate. It was invented by Amir Khusro (1253–1325 CE). In modern times, the singer Amir Khan helped popularize it and researched its origins and the syllables used. Nissar Hussain Khan was a tarana singer.

== Form ==
A second, contrasting melody, usually with higher notes, is introduced once before returning to the main melody. The tarana may include a Persian quatrain, and may use syllables from sitar or tabla such as "dar-dar" or "dir-dir"; singers might recite full compositions (e.g. tihais, gats, tukdas) within the body of the tarana.

== History ==
Thakur Jaidev Singh, a commentator on Indian music, said:

[Tarana] was entirely an invention of Khusrau... True, Khusrau had before him the example of Nirgit songs using śuṣk-akṣaras (meaningless words) and pāṭ-akṣaras (mnemonic syllables of the mridang)... But generally speaking, the Nirgit used hard consonants. Khusrau... introduced mostly Persian words with soft consonants. Secondly, he so arranged these words that they bore some sense.
