= Sleeps with the Fishes =

Studio album by Pieter Nooten and Michael Brook
- Released: 12 October 1987
- Recorded: 1987
- Studios: Blackwing Studios, London, England
- Genres: Dark wave, ambient, gothic rock
- Length: 47:38
- Language: English
- Label: 4AD
- Producer: Michael Brook

Pieter Nooten chronology
Sleeps with the Fishes (1987)	Hanggliding (1992)

Michael Brook chronology
Hybrid (1985)	Sleeps with the Fishes (1987)	Mustt Mustt (1990)

Sleeps with the Fishes is the lone collaborative album from Clan of Xymox founding member Pieter Nooten and Canadian guitarist/producer Michael Brook, released by 4AD on 12 October 1987. Intended as Nooten's debut solo album after a brief split from Clan of Xymox, the record turned into a collaboration with Brook after a suggestion from 4AD label founder and boss Ivo Watts-Russell. Though not a huge commercial success, Sleeps with the Fishes was described by AllMusic as "essential listening for fans of 4AD, ambient music, minimalism, experimental electronic music, and morose themes alike... an overlooked masterpiece."

== Background ==
According to Martin Aston's 2013 book Facing the Other Way: The Story of 4AD, the genesis of the album formed after Pieter Nooten left Clan of Xymox in 1987 (leader Ronny Moorings subsequently restored the band's name to simply 'Xymox'). "For me, Pieter was the heart of Xymox, and taking him out, they became much more like their influences. Pieter was more interested in classical music at that point," said Ivo Watts-Russell. Nooten had told Watts-Russell that he had some "basic, but still intimate, melancholic material," which the label boss had appreciated and responded with the offer of making a solo album. Watts-Russell originally planned to produce the album, choosing London's Blackwing Studios as the recording location, but soon felt that he "couldn't bring anything fresh to [the recordings]... we needed new blood." Watts-Russell was a fan of the Editions EG Records label, and suggested Canadian ambient guitarist and producer Michael Brook, whose debut album Hybrid (featuring Brian Eno and Daniel Lanois) had caught the label boss's ear. "Michael's input was so large, it became a joint record... I was really enjoying Brian Eno and Michael's first album, so I loved releasing something in that vein, combined with Pieter's melodies," said Watts-Russell. Nooten hailed Brook as "the ultimate producer - calm, thoughtful, highly skilled and, above all, a brilliant guitarist. We shared the same approach to the material: subtle, sensitive, thoughtful, intimate and intense." A number of tracks on Sleeps with the Fishes were re-recorded from previous Clan of Xymox contributions: "Equal Ways" from 1985's Clan of Xymox, and "After the Call" and "Theme I" (herein renamed "Clouds" and featuring vocals and lyrics) from 1986's Medusa.

Sleeps with the Fishes was released as 4AD catalog number CAD 710 in October 1987 on vinyl LP and CD in the United Kingdom (a reissue of the CD briefly appeared in 1998, with revised tray and disc artwork and the "reissue catalog number" of GAD 710).

The album features a roster of 4AD alum and session musicians, including violinist Gini Ball, vocalist Alison Limerick, and percussionists Peter Ulrich and John Fryer, all of whom had performed as part of the 4AD supergroup This Mortal Coil across three albums: 1984's It'll End in Tears, 1986's Filigree & Shadow, and 1991's Blood. Additionally, Nooten and vocalist Deirdre Rutkowski performed a version of "Several Times I" as part of This Mortal Coil on the collective's album Blood in 1991. The artwork for Sleeps with the Fishes was designed by Vaughan Oliver, with calligraphy by graphic designer Chris Bigg and photography by Diana Grandi and Sarah Tucker.

Following the album's release, Nooten rejoined the rebranded Xymox, now signed to Wing/PolyGram Records, for their third and fourth albums, Twist of Shadows (1989) and Phoenix (1991), with the latter album featuring guitar from Brook on two tracks. Brook would continue producing and recording, including three further albums on 4AD: Cobalt Blue and Live at the Aquarium in 1992, and the motion picture soundtrack for the film Albino Alligator in 1997.

== Reception ==
Professional ratings
Review scores
Source	Rating
AllMusic	4/5 stars
Opus	very positive
Peek-a-Boo	10/10

AllMusic's Tim DiGravina awarded the album 4 out of 5 stars, praising that, "It's hard to imagine this collaboration between [Nooten and Brook] working any better. Sleeps with the Fishes comprises 15 excellent, moody soundscapes, given depth by Nooten's subtle vocals and instrumentation that sounds piped in from some dreamy other world. Brook's guitar rings and chimes, sounding cleaner, and his guitar work is more precise than ever. Synthesizers creep in and around the vocals and guitar to stunning effect. The album seems to define the word 'mysterious.'" DiGravina concludes, "Sleeps with the Fishes could not be a more perfect dark ambient, experimental album. It's essential listening for fans of 4AD, ambient music, minimalism, experimental electronic music, and morose themes alike. This album is an overlooked masterpiece." Jason Morehead of music blog Opus said of the album, "Sleeps with the Fishes is adept at taking what should be morose music and converts it into something resplendent. And it maintains that sad, beautiful sensation throughout its length. Not too many albums have such a perfectly-realized mood and atmosphere, one that draws you into its haunting world and stays with you long after the last song ends. But Sleeps with the Fishes is just such an album. And though some of its content delves into the goth and ambient genres, it easily avoids the former's self-indulgent melodramatics and the latter's vacuousness."

Sleeps with the Fishes also holds high rank with 4AD founder Ivo Watts-Russell, who said, "Among the forum world of 4AD followers, some people think it's 4AD's best record. I'd place it in the top ten. It's absolutely beautiful. So is the sleeve, with Chris Bigg's embossed calligraphy." The album is also a favorite and inspiration to Warren Defever, whose art rock project His Name Is Alive would sign with 4AD in 1990. Defever singles out Sleeps with the Fishes and fellow 4AD releases Le Mystère des Voix Bulgares by the Bulgarian State Television Female Vocal Choir and This Mortal Coil's cover of "Song to the Siren" as most influential, and told Martin Aston in Facing the Other Way: The Story of 4AD in 2013, "Twenty-five years later, they still seem just as important, inspirational, bewildering and mystifying."

== Track listing ==
All tracks are written by Pieter Nooten.

No.	Title	Length
1.	"Several Times I"	3:02
2.	"Searching"	3:23
3.	"The Choice"	4:29
4.	"After the Call"	5:16
5.	"Finally II"	1:53
6.	"Instrumental"	3:53
7.	"Suddenly II"	1:30
8.	"Suddenly I"	2:36
9.	"Clouds"	4:27
10.	"Finally I"	3:49
11.	"Several Times II"	2:05
12.	"Equal Ways"	5:00
13.	"These Waves"	3:12
14.	"Time"	1:51
15.	"Several Times III"	1:13
Total length:		47:38

== Credits ==
=== Musicians ===
- Pieter Nooten – keyboards, vocals
- Michael Brook – infinite guitars, keyboards, buzz bass
- Gini Ball – violin
- Tim Eaton – oboe
- John Fryer – percussion on "Suddenly"
- Alison Limerick – vocals on "Equal Ways"
- Audrey Riley – cello
- Rob Suters – string arrangements, piano
- Peter Ulrich – percussion

=== Production ===
Recording personnel

- Michael Brook – producer, engineer
- Nigel K. Hine – additional engineering
- Brian Eno and Jean-Philippe Rykiel – DX7 sounds

Artwork

- Vaughan Oliver – sleeve art direction and design
- Chris Bigg – calligraphy
- Diana Grandi – back sleeve photograph
- Sarah Tucker – inner sleeve photograph
