= Blind Heart =

Blind Heart or variants may refer to:

== Books ==
- Confession, or, The Blind Heart : a domestic story, by William Gilmore Simms 1856
- The Blind Heart, by Storm Jameson 1964
- The Blindness of the Heart, by Julia Franck 2009

== Theatre, Film and TV ==
- The Blind Heart (El Corazón Ciego) comedy by Gregorio Martínez Sierra which inaugurated the Lope de Vega Theatre (Seville) 1929
- Sliepo srdce (The Blind Heart), play for children by Rajmund Kupareo 1944
- Blind Heart, film with José Alonso (actor) 2002
- My Blind Heart (German: Mein blindes Herz), Austrian film
- Blind Hearts, 1921 American silent drama film produced by Hobart Bosworth who stars along with Madge Bellamy and Raymond McKee

== Music ==
- Blind Heart (EP) by American Christian Punk band Poured Out
- "Blind Heart", single by Swedish-based DJ-duo Cazzette with Terri Bjerre from List of number-one dance singles of 2015 (U.S.) 2015
- "Blind Hearts", single by Twist of Shadows
- "Blind Hearts", single by Anka Wolbert 1987
