= Frog Feast =

2005 video game

- Developer: Rastersoft
- Publisher: OlderGames (Note: Genesis, Super NES, and Jaguar versions were published by Chaos89.com. The X68000 version was published by Rastersoft.)
- Producer: R.W. Bivins
- Programmer: Charles Doty
- Platforms: Neo Geo CD, Sega CD, Genesis, X68000, Super NES, CD-i, Jaguar CD, Jaguar, CD32, Dreamcast, FM Towns Marty
- Release: August 20, 2005: Neo Geo CD, Sega CD; WW: August 20, 2005 Genesis; WW: March 12, 2006 X68000; WW: July 13, 2006 SNES; WW: 2006 CD-i; WW: July 28, 2007 Jaguar CD; WW: September 29, 2007 Jaguar; WW: October 30, 2007 CD32, Dreamcast, FM Towns; WW: November 15, 2007
- Genre: Action
- Modes: Single-player, multiplayer

Frog Feast is a 2005 action video game by independent developer Rastersoft and originally published by OlderGames for the Neo Geo CD and Sega CD. It was ported to Genesis, Super Nintendo Entertainment System, X68000, CD-i, Jaguar CD, Jaguar, Amiga CD32, Dreamcast, and FM Towns Marty. Frog Feast is a clone of the 1978 Frogs arcade game by Gremlin Industries. Players control frogs on lily pads attempting to eat more flies than the other in a set time limit.

The game was programmed by Charles Doty. Versions for Nuon and TurboDuo were planned but never released. Frog Feast received mixed reception from reviewers.

== Gameplay ==
Gameplay screenshot (Neo Geo CD)

Frog Feast is an action game similar to the 1978 Gremlin arcade game Frogs (a clone of Frogs was released in 1982 as Frog Bog on the Intellivision, also known as Frogs and Flies on the Atari 2600). The game can be played by either a single-player against a computer-controlled opponent, or a second player. The objective of the game is to eat more flies than the other within a set time limit. Each frog jumps from one lilypad to the other, while a number of flies fly around the screen.

The player pushes the fire button to eat flies with the frog's tongue, but only when hopping to a lilypad. The flies are worth one point when they are eaten. Each round starts out in the morning with and the game progresses throughout the day, with the sky turning a clearer shade of blue, and eventually turning darker as the day ends. The frog who has captured the most flies during gameplay is the winner. There are no options or settings menu.

== Development and release ==
Frog Feast was created by Rastersoft, a small-scale game developer established in 2005 with the goal to support discontinued platforms with new titles. It was programmed by Charles Doty, who previously worked for Cinematix Studios on titles published by Eidos Interactive (formerly Domark), such as Total Mayhem (1996) and Revenant (1999). Doty became interested in supporting old consoles and arcade systems, and wanted to enter the video game industry to program for 16-bit consoles. Doty wanted a simple game design that would be fun to play and realistic to complete on any system, but the project grew beyond his initial plans. The game was initially coded in assembly language, before Doty switched to C with assembly language within a month of starting production, allowing him to implement low level routines. As the project began to progress, Doty contacted OlderGames about marketing the game, as he had previously worked for the company on unreleased Neo Geo, Sega CD, and TurboDuo versions of Super Fighter (1993). OlderGames was a company co-founded by John Campbell and R.W. Bivins in 2002, which focused on publishing unreleased titles as well as developing new titles for classic consoles. Bivins served as the game's executive producer.

Frog Feast was first published by OlderGames for the Neo Geo CD and Sega CD on August 20, 2005, at the Classic Gaming Expo (CGE). A Sega Genesis port was published by Chaos89.com on March 12, 2006. An X68000 port was released by Rastersoft on July 13, 2006. A Super Nintendo Entertainment System port was also published by Chaos89.com that same year. A CD-i port was released on July 28, 2007, at CGE, while orders were later opened up via OlderGames' online store. It became the first commercially released homebrew game for the CD-i. An Atari Jaguar CD port was published by OlderGames on September 29, 2007, as a limited run of 50 copies. All fifty numbered copies of the Jaguar CD version were defective, which led to OlderGames reprinting and doubling the production run to 100 copies.

An Atari Jaguar version was also released by Chaos89.com on October 30, 2007. To promote the Jaguar version, Frog Feast themed t-shirts and mouse pads were given during the launch event. The Jaguar version was made using a library by Sébastien Briais of the French group The Removers, which eases game creation on the console. Ports for Amiga CD32, Dreamcast, and FM Towns Marty were released simultaneously by OlderGames on November 15, 2007. The CD32 and FM Towns versions were limited to 50 copies each, while the Dreamcast version was limited to 100 copies. The game was also ported to arcade systems like the CP System, Neo Geo MVS, PolyGame Master, and Sega System C2. Versions for Nuon and TurboDuo were planned but never released. A ColecoVision conversion was also in development by AtariAge community member Robert "Mark2008" Dupuy with permission from Rastersoft. However, work on the ColecoVision port was eventually abandoned by Dupuy. Platforms such as the 3DO and PC-FX were also considered. In 2009, independent publisher Songbird Productions acquired the rights to Frog Feast and re-released the Jaguar CD version that same year. The Jaguar version was included as part of the Soccer Kid + Frog Feast compilation, released as a limited run by Songbird Productions in 2017.

== Reception ==
Reception

Review scores
Publication	Score
Atari User	(Jaguar) 5/10
neXGam	(Jaguar) 3/10
PC Action	(Jaguar) Insufficient

Frog Feast garnered mixed reception from reviewers. PC Action's Joachim Hesse gave the Atari Jaguar release a negative rating. However, Hesse expressed that "All two Jaguar owners who are still active can celebrate - because hey, releasing something like this after Crysis & co. is also kind of cool." Kieren Hawken writing in Atari User reviewed the Atari Jaguar CD version. Hawken found the visuals basic but well drawn and commended the audio, but felt that its simple concept would only appeal to fans of Frog Bog (1982) on the Intellivision and dedicated collectors.

MeriStation's Francisco Alberto Serrano regarded Frog Feast as a classic example of a game ported to different formats. Nils of the German website neXGam also reviewed the Jaguar CD release. He praised the lack of loading times, but faulted its lack of variety and game modes, simple presentation, and undemanding gameplay. Author Robin Wilde wrote that "It's not exactly a huge offer in the game department (...) but it can be considered a flag planted on the CD-i's territory, if nothing else."
