= Ai no Wakusei =

2004 studio album by Atsushi Sakurai

Studio album by Atsushi Sakurai
- Released: June 23, 2004
- Recorded: February–April 2004
- Genres: Alternative rock, synthpop, industrial
- Length: 65:53
- Label: Victor
- Producer: Atsushi Sakurai

Singles from Ai no Wakusei
- 1. "Sacrifice" Released: May 26, 2004; 2. "Taiji/Smell" Released: July 21, 2004; 3. "Wakusei -Rebirth-" Released: February 23, 2005

Ai no Wakusei (愛の惑星; "Planet of Love") is the only solo album released by Japanese singer Atsushi Sakurai, lead vocalist of the rock band Buck-Tick. It was released by Victor Entertainment on June 23, 2004. In addition to providing lead vocals, Sakurai wrote the lyrics to every song, while the music was composed and performed by many different collaborators. Contributors include, Wayne Hussey, Robin Guthrie, Yasuyuki Okamura, and Theatre Brook frontman Taiji Sato. Three singles were released to promote the album. Ai no Wakusei reached number 15 on the Oricon Albums Chart, and charted for four weeks.

== Overview ==
Atsushi Sakurai said his solo career started from Junichi Tanaka, the man who gave Buck-Tick their big break by signing them to Victor Entertainment, saying he wanted to see the singer collaborate with various other musicians. As there were people from other countries and various music genres involved, Sakurai said it was difficult to keep a cohesiveness, but he and his vocals served as the pillar that held it all together.

Sakurai made his solo debut with the single "Sacrifice", which was released on May 26, 2004 and reached number 25 on the Oricon Singles Chart. The single includes a cover of Kenji Sawada's 1978 song "Love (Dakishimetai)". A different mix of "Sacrifice" appears on Ai no Wakusei, released the following month. Wayne Hussey, the composer of "Sacrifice", reused its music for the song "Running with Scissors" on the Mission's 2007 album God Is a Bullet.

Also included on Ai no Wakusei, is a remix of "Yokan", which Sakurai originally created with Xymox for the 1992 omnibus Dance 2 Noise 002.

The double A-side "Taiji/Smell" was Sakurai's highest-charting solo single, reaching number 22 when released on July 21, 2004. The version of "Taiji" included is the "Embryo's Theatre Version". The single also includes a cover of "I Like Chopin", under the title "Amaoto wa Chopin no Shirabe -I Like Chopin-".

A different mix of "Wakusei" was released as the third and final single, "Wakusei -Rebirth-", on February 23, 2005. It includes a cover of "Hymne à l'amour" under the title "Ai no Sanka" and featuring the members of Gari. The single peaked at number 62 on the chart.

Sakurai toured to promote the album and a recording of his first ever solo performance at NHK Hall on July 21, 2004, was released as the home video Explosion: Ai no Wakusei Live 2004 on December 16, 2004.

== Release ==
Ai no Wakusei was released on June 23, 2004. The album was packaged in a special long box, that included a photo book.

A remastered "Collector's Box" edition of Ai no Wakusei was released in a limited production amount on September 30, 2015. It includes a second CD compiling all of the album's singles and their B-sides, the original 1992 version of "Yokan", and the tracks "Explosion" and "Amaoto wa Chopin no Shirabe -I Like Chopin- (Mix Mitsu Ai)" which were originally on a CD sent to winners of a contest in 2004. It also includes a Blu-ray disc containing the previously released Explosion: Ai no Wakusei Live 2004 home video and the three singles' music videos, in addition to a third CD featuring live recordings from the same concert.

Following Sakurai's death in October 2023, Ai no Wakusei and its three singles were made available for digital purchase and streaming worldwide in December 2023. The music videos to the singles were also published on YouTube. The album is being remastered and released on SHM-CD and vinyl record on March 7, 2024. The latter will be a limited amount of 2-disc clear vinyl, and include a poster.

== Track listing ==
All lyrics are written by Atsushi Sakurai.

No.	Title	Music	Arrangement	Length
1.	"Sacrifice (Last Confused Mix)"	Wayne Hussey	Hussey	4:28
2.	"Yellow Pig"	Raymond Watts	Watts	5:49
3.	"X-Lover"	Bryan Black	Xlover	4:04
4.	"I Hate You All"	J. G. Thirlwell	Thirlwell	3:29
5.	"Wonderful World (Injection to UK Mix)"	Hisashi Suto	Hige	4:26
6.	"Smell"	Yasuyuki Okamura	Okamura	5:22
7.	"Märchen" ("Fairy Tale")	Sakurai; Robin Guthrie	Guthrie	3:22
8.	"Fantasy"	Cube Juice	Cube Juice	4:04
9.	"Taiji" (胎児, "Embryo")	Taiji Sato	Sato	5:24
10.	"Hallelujah!" (ハレルヤ!)	Yukio Murata	My Way My Love	5:51
11.	"Shingetsu" (新月, "New Moon")	Masami Tsuchiya	Tsuchiya	6:14
12.	"Yokan (2004 Re-construct)" (予感 (2004 re-construct), "Premonition (2004 Re-construct)")	Ronny Moorings; Anka Wolbert	Xymox	4:42
13.	"Wakusei" (惑星, "Planet")	Kenji Kishida	Shigekazu Aida	4:02
14.	"Neko" (猫, "Cat")	Masatomo Kawase	Cloudchair	4:13
Total length:				65:53

== Personnel ==
- Atsushi Sakurai – vocals

Other performers

- Wayne Hussey – backing vocals and all instruments (except acoustic drums) on track 1
- Kosaku Abe – acoustic drums on track 1
- Raymond Watts – all instruments on track 2
- Bryan Black/Xlover – backing vocals and all instruments on track 3
- J. G. Thirlwell a.k.a. Foetus – all instruments and backing vocals on track 4
- Jay Wasco – additional drum programming on track 4
- Yuki Saito – guitar on track 5
- Hisashi Suto – guitar on track 5
- Tomoyuki Miyakawa – bass on track 5
- Hirotoshi "Filipo" Kawasaki – drums on track 5
- Koichi "Koteisui" Satou – drums on track 5
- Saya Satou – backing vocals on track 5
- Yasuyuki Okamura – all instruments on track 6
- Hideyuki Fukasawa – programming on track 6
- Robin Guthrie – all instruments on track 7
- Makiko Suzuki – backing vocals on track 7
- Cube Juice – all instruments on track 8
- Taiji Sato – guitar, programming and backing vocals on track 9
- Takashi Nakajou – bass on track 9
- Takashi Numazawa – drums on track 9
- Emerson Kitamura – keyboards on track 9
- Yukio Murata – electric guitar, acoustic guitar and sampling on track 10
- Dai Hiroe – bass on track 10
- Takeshi Owaki – drums on track 10
- Masami Tsuchiya – guitar on track 11
- Tokie – bass on track 11
- Masafumi Minato – drums on track 11
- Hoppy Kamiyama – "digital president, slide geisha, scum tape from the garbage, gram-pot" and strings arrangement on track 11
- Great Eida Strings – strings on track 11
- Xymox – all instruments on track 12
- Ronny Moorings – backing vocals on track 12
- Anka Wolbert – backing vocals on track 12
- Shigekazu Aida – guitar on track 13
- Kenji Satou – bass on track 13
- Masahiro Komatsu – drums on track 13
- Masatomo Kawase/Cloudchair – all instruments on track 14

Production

- Atsushi Sakurai – producer
- Junichi Tanaka – executive producer
- Kotaro Kojima – engineer, mastering
