= The March Violets =

English post-punk/gothic rock band

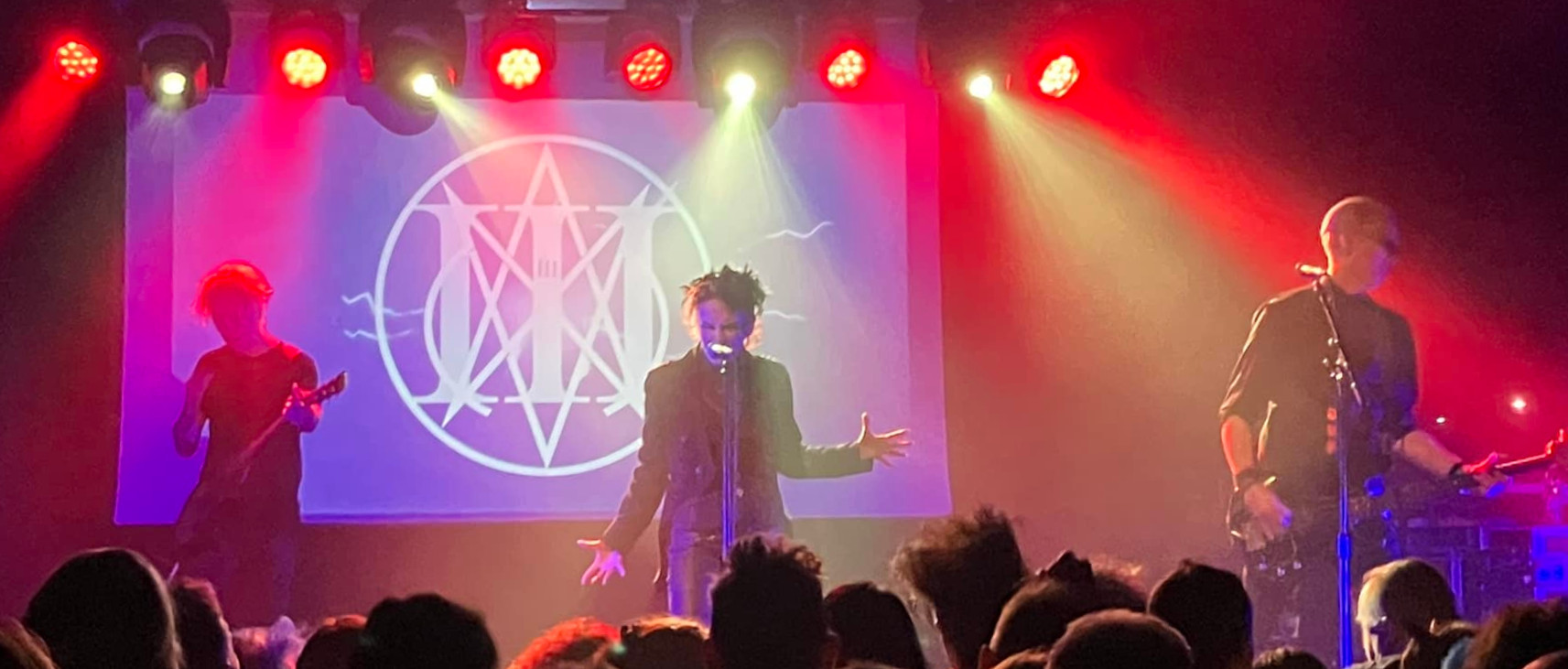
- The March Violets at the Garage in 2023

Background information
- Origin: Leeds, England
- Genres: Post-punk; gothic rock
- Years active: 1981–1987, 2007, 2010–present
- Labels: Merciful Release, Rebirth, London
- Members: Tom Ashton; Rosie Garland; Mat Thorpe
- Past members: Simon Denbigh; Laurence Elliot; Cleo Murray; Andy Tolson; Chris Shoel; Joanna Moy; William Faith
- Website: marchvioletsband.com

The March Violets are an English post-punk/gothic rock band formed in 1981 in Leeds, incorporating male and female singers, drum machine rhythms and echo-laden electric guitar, much in the style of fellow Leeds band the Sisters of Mercy. Seven March Violets singles reached the UK Indie Chart; the Natural History collection also was an indie hit (hitting number 3 in 1984).

== History ==
The March Violets formed in December 1981, meeting at Leeds University. The original band members were guitarist Tom Ashton, bassist Laurence "Loz" Elliot, male vocalist Simon "Detroit" Denbigh and female vocalist Rosie Garland. Percussion was provided by a drum machine, nicknamed "Dr. Rhythm", a feature they had in common with many of the bands in the Leeds scene at the time. Fellow student Andrew Eldritch, lead singer of the Sisters of Mercy, released the band's debut 7", the four-track "Religious as Hell" EP, on his Merciful Release label on 28 August 1982. A second single on Merciful Release, "Grooving in Green", followed on 27 November 1982.

The band then established their own Rebirth record label, releasing the "Crow Baby" single on 30 April 1983. Cleo Murray joined as second female vocalist for the next single, "Snake Dance", issued in December 1983. The song was a club hit, and is considered a classic of the gothic rock genre. Garland left after "Snake Dance", and Murray took over as sole female singer for "Walk Into the Sun", issued 4 August 1984. That October, the band released their first compilation album, Natural History, which collected the first four singles plus two tracks from a 1983 BBC Peel Session.

The March Violets shifted towards a more pop-oriented sound, and Denbigh left the band in early February 1985, prior to the band's first American tour in March 1985. Denbigh did appear on the next single, "Deep", released 11 May 1985 but recorded prior to his departure. A second compilation album, Electric Shades, was issued in the US by Relativity Records that year; it collected the contents of the "Snake Dance", "Walk Into the Sun" and "Deep" singles, including a piano-laden remix of "Snake Dance".

The band then signed to major label London Records, adding drummer Andy Tolson to the lineup. The "Turn to the Sky" single was released 24 February 1986 on London, although still bearing the Rebirth imprint. The song (and their cover of "Miss Amanda Jones" by the Rolling Stones) was featured on the soundtrack to the 1987 film Some Kind of Wonderful, which included a live performance by the band of "Turn to the Sky." They broke up later that year.

In 1993, the band's first CD compilation, The Botanic Verses, was released by Jungle Records in the UK and Cleopatra Records in the US; it covered their entire 1982-1984 catalogue.

== Other projects ==
Before the band's split, Ashton had guested as live guitarist for The Sisters of Mercy and the Danse Society. In 1991, he joined Clan of Xymox for their Phoenix US tour, and relocated there. He later composed indie film soundtracks. Ashton now produces various bands in the South East USA, including Vision Video and Tears for the Dying.

Murray briefly fronted the band Lovecraft in the early 1990s, releasing two 1993 singles, "Hungry" and "Medicine".

Denbigh formed the Batfish Boys and D-Rok.

Garland became a poet and cabaret performer, performing under the name Rosie Lugosi. Later, she was the victim of a stalker, with the 2007 court case featured as a lead article in the Manchester Evening News. Following several poetry collections, Garland's debut novel, The Palace of Curiosities, was published by HarperCollins in 2013, earning several awards and a longlisting for the Desmond Elliott Prize.

== Reformation and subsequent activity ==
On 8 October 2007, the March Violets played a one-off reunion gig in Leeds with original members Denbigh, Garland and Ashton, plus Mat Thorpe (Isolation Division) standing in on bass. Although the show was a success, plans for further shows were put on hold whilst Garland was ill with throat cancer in 2009.

Once Garland was fully recovered, the March Violets restarted their live reformation with a secret warm-up show at Whitby in October 2010. On 13 November 2010, the March Violets played their first London show in 25 years, at O2 Academy Islington with new bassist Joanna Moy (previously of Screaming Banshee Aircrew).

In November 2010, the band embarked on a project to make their first proper album using Pledge Music (as opposed to the previous compilation albums of their singles and EPs). Over 600 fans pledged support and they raised 196% of the money required. In addition to raising money for the recording of the album, the band provided funds to charities (Friends of the Earth, Cloth Cat and Macmillan Cancer Support). During the recording of the album, they released several promotional items, including a digital-only promo release of "Tokyo Flow" and a remix of "Dandelion King", as well as a "gigeo" (a combination of a gig in Leeds where they shot the promo video with members of the audience) of "Dandelion King".

In 2012, they did a small live tour that showcased some of the new tracks.

The album Made Glorious was released in April 2013 as a digital download to all fans who had pledged support. The album primarily consisted of original tracks, with some material being remixes of tracks from the Trinity and Love Will Kill You EPs. Physical hard copies, T-shirts, an A4 booklet (featuring lyrics, artwork and photos) and posters were distributed to those who had pledged support in June 2013. Pledgers received a special 2-CD pack featuring 12 additional remixes including two tracks not included on the original album ("Liam Hits Seven" and "Black Heart").

To support the new album, the band performed gigs in October and November 2013, and a short tour in April 2014, including a headlining slot at the Convergence 20 festival in Chicago, the first US appearance of the reformed lineup. This was followed by a return tour of the West Coast in June 2014.

In August 2015, the band confirmed that Moy had officially left the band. The following month, they announced an American tour with William Faith on bass, scheduled for October.

In early October, the band announced that after completing the Mortality tour, they would record a new album of the same name. It was funded via PledgeMusic and achieved 167% funding, with 10% of the funding going to Macmillan Cancer Support. The initial version of the Mortality album was released for download by Denbigh on Christmas Day to those who had supported its development. This version consisted of 10 tracks; all except the title track were "re-forged" versions of older songs. Mars Williams of the Psychedelic Furs provided additional saxophone on several tracks. The physical release of the album was planned to include additional remixes and extended versions but never made it to fruition.

After releasing the first remix to pledgers in early 2016, Denbigh suffered a stroke and was hospitalised for a long period.

On 16 July 2021, the band released a limited edition double vinyl album, Big Soul Kiss: The BBC Recordings via Jungle Records. This was a special for Record Store Day in the UK and also available as a standard release in other territories. It sold out within three weeks of release. A repressing was made in 2022, alongside a new compilation Play Loud Play Purple and a five-CD box set that included two CDs of unreleased material, The Palace of Infinite Darkness

On 7 October 2022, the band announced on a new website that they were having a reunion for tours and new recordings in 2023/24. The reunion lineup is Rosie Garland, Tom Ashton, William Faith, all survivors from their previous live activity in 2015. In January 2024 it was announced on Facebook that William Faith had left the band and was replaced by Mat Thorpe on bass and vocals.

== Discography ==
=== Studio albums ===
- Made Glorious (2013), self-released
- Mortality (2015), self-released
- Crocodile Promises (2024), Metropolis Records

=== Compilation albums ===
- Natural History (1984), Rebirth (UK Indie number 3)
- Electric Shades (1985), Relativity Records
- The Botanic Verses (1993), Jungle Records/Cleopatra Records
- Big Soul Kiss: The BBC Recordings (2021), Jungle Records
- Play Loud Play Purple (2022), Jungle Records
- The Palace of Infinite Darkness (2022), Jungle Records

=== Singles and EPs ===
Year	Title	UK	UK Indie	Label
1982	March Violets (EP)	-	32	Merciful Release
1982	"Religious as Hell"	-	-	Merciful Release
1982	"Grooving in Green"	-	14	Merciful Release
1983	"Crow Baby"	-	6	Rebirth
1984	"Snake Dance"	-	2	Rebirth
1984	"Walk into the Sun"	-	1	Rebirth
1985	"Deep"	-	2	Rebirth
1986	"Turn to the Sky"	84	-	Rebirth
2007	Trinity (EP)	-	-	Self Released
2011	Love Will Kill You (EP)	-	-	Self Released
