= Frank Weyzig =

Dutch producer, composer and band member (born 1957)

- Born: 5 July 1957 (age 69); Netherlands
- Genres: Indie rock, alternative rock, new wave, psychedelic
- Occupations: Musician, composer, producer
- Instruments: Bass guitar, guitar, keyboards, programming
- Years active: 1984 – present
- Label: Echozone
- Formerly of: Born For Bliss, Vaselyne, Stargazing Project, White Rose Transmission
- Website: frankweyzig.com

Frank Weyzig is a Dutch producer, composer and band member known for his contribution to the original Clan of Xymox and his work for the indie new wave band, Born for Bliss. More recently, Weyzig has been involved with Vaselyne, White Rose Transmission and Stargazing Project. In January 2011, he founded Turmoil Music, a new music platform for independent artists.

== Music career ==
Weyzig started his music career in 1985 with the Dutch electronic wave band Clan of Xymox when they were signed with the English independent label 4AD, which released their first album, Clan of Xymox that year. The track "7th Time" was picked up by John Peel, and led to the band recording two of the Peel Sessions at the BBC, in June and November 1985. Weyzig played guitar and keyboards on the album, and performed with the band on stage as a live guitarist and keyboard player until 1990.

In 1995, Weyzig (vocals, guitar, editing/production) formed the Dutch indie-wave band Born For Bliss along with Remco Helbers (bass guitar, Chapman Stick) and Willem Van Antwerpen (drums). In 1996, Born For Bliss released its first single, "Arabia", on Nuclear Blast – Death Wish Office, a German label. The single became a club hit and made its way high into the German alternative charts. In 1997, the band released its first full-length album, Flowing with the Flu, which also entered the German alternative charts.

In 1998, the German Goth rock group Love Like Blood asked Weyzig to write a song for their Snake Killer album. This resulted in the track "Ylene", which became one of their favorites during Love Like Blood's live performances later that year.

From 1999 to 2008, Weyzig took a break from releasing albums, but returned in 2009 to join his long time friend Rob Keyzer in the band White Rose Transmission, founded by Carlo van Putten (singer of Dead Guitars) and Adrian Borland (front man of the British 1980s' cult band The Sound). As co-writer, band member and producer, Weyzig and the band released Spiders in the Mind Web (Echozone, 2010) and the live album Spinning Webs at Night (Echozone, 2011).

In 2011, Weyzig founded Turmoil Music, a free music platform for independent artists. In the same year, the German label Echozone released the second Born For Bliss album, Between Living and Dreaming.

Also in 2011, Weyzig and Remco Helbers formed Stargazing Project and Echozone released a digital version of their album Stargazing – a collection of songs inspired by mysteries such as conspiracies, alien abductions, UFO encounters and other strange events.

Weyzig's latest project is Vaselyne, a collaboration with the Dutch singer Yvette Winkler, known for her contribution to Pieter Nooten's 2010 album, Here is Why. Vaselyne's first EP, Earthbound, was released in the spring 2012, with the full album due for release in spring 2013.

In 2012, Echozone re-released the first Born For Bliss album, Flowing with the Flu, a re-mastered version of the 1997 album with extra, never before released remixes.

=== With Clan of Xymox ===
Albums:

- Clan of Xymox (1985)

=== With Born For Bliss ===
Singles/EPs:

- "Born For Bliss" (1994)
- "Arabia" (1996)

Albums:

- Flowing with the Flu (1997)
- Between Living and Dreaming (2011)
- Flowing with the Flu (re-release) (2012)

=== With White Rose Transmission ===
Albums:

- Spiders in the Mindweb (2009)
- Spinning Webs at Night (2010)

=== With Stargazing Project ===
Albums:

- Stargazing (2011)

=== With Vaselyne ===
EPs:

- Earthbound (2012)
