= Ronny Moorings =

Dutch musician (born 1961)

- Mooring performing in Orlando, Florida in 2008

Background information
- Born: Ronald Moerings; 20 May 1961 (age 65); Roosendaal, Netherlands
- Genres: Dark wave, electronic, gothic rock, industrial rock, film music, Post Punk
- Occupation: Musician
- Instruments: Guitar, keyboards, bass
- Years active: 1981–present
- Labels: 4AD, PolyGram, Metropolis
- Member of: Clan of Xymox
- Website: www.clanofxymox.com

Ronald Moerings known professionally as Ronny Moorings (born 20 May 1961), is a Dutch musician best known for his work with darkwave band Clan of Xymox. Moorings has been the band's principal singer/songwriter since the early 1990s.

== Music career ==
=== With Clan of Xymox on 4AD ===
While a sociology student in Nijmegen, Netherlands in 1981, Moorings met fellow musician and graphic designer Anka Wolbert who shared a similar taste in new wave music. In 1983 they recorded a five track EP entitled Subsequent Pleasures and gave a copy to Brendan Perry after a chance encounter in an Amsterdam restaurant. Perry invited the pair to perform as the opening act for the inaugural UK tour of his project, Dead Can Dance, in 1984. Also while in Amsterdam, Moorings and Wolbert met fellow musician Pieter Nooten, who contributed several tracks of his own, making Xymox a trio. These songs formed the crux of the 1984 tour and the 1985 Debut LP Clan of Xymox, released on UK label 4AD. Lengthening the band's name to the title of its debut album, Clan of Xymox would go on to record two albums while signed with 4AD, achieving charting success in Europe and the United Kingdom.

=== With Xymox on Polygram ===
In 1988, Moorings, Nooten, and Wolbert signed with New York-based record label Polygram while agreeing to shorten the name again to "Xymox". Their Polygram debut Twist of Shadows would prove to be the most commercially successful of their career, with "Imagination" charting on the Billboard Hot 100 and the band achieving regular MTV rotation. As Xymox bandmates engaged in side projects, Moorings assumed greater control, claiming Twist of Shadows was "made entirely independently, without the rest of the musicians, who were then on vacation." After the release of 1991's Phoenix, Nooten and Wolbert left the band, leaving Moorings as the sole songwriter. After a few experimentations with electronic music style recordings, Moorings released two albums in London: Metamorphosis (1991) and Headclouds (1992) on ZOK/ X-Ult records. In 1994 he moved back to Amsterdam and resumed touring in the Netherlands with girlfriend Mojca Zugna and old band mates Frank Weyzig and William Van Antwerpen. Shortly after in 1996 Moorings wrote music for the CD-R game Total Mayhem by Domark.

=== As Clan of Xymox on independent labels ===
In 1997, Moorings resurrected Clan of Xymox with the release of the album Hidden Faces partly produced by David M. Allen, infusing elements of gothic rock, industrial rock, and EBM music into new releases, and eventually settling on Metropolis Records as principal distributing label. In 1998, Moorings collaborated with Patrick J. Collins on the music tracks for the Revenant CD-R game on Domark, released in 1999. Also in 1999, the album Creatures was released on Pandaimonium Records (EU) and Metropolis Records (USA).

In 2001, Moorings released Notes From The Underground followed a year later by Remixes From The Underground (2002), featuring remixes by the likes of Front 242, Assemblage 23, and Iris. The follow-up album Farewell was released in 2003. Gothic Paradise called the album "Overall an excellent work bringing all of the previous styles that Clan of Xymox has presented us with and melting them together into the excellent Electro Goth mix."

Other albums followed in quick succession. 2004 saw the release of The Best Of Clan Of Xymox, featuring re-recordings of songs released on 4AD. In 2006 a studio album Breaking Point and a DVD named Visible - edited, filmed and produced by Moorings and Mojca Zugna - was released. In Love We Trust was released on Trisol Music Group in Europe and Metropolis in the USA in 2009. Two years later in 2011 the album Darkest Hour was released. It featured the track "Delete" on video, filmed and edited by Ronny Moorings. Gothic Paradise called the album "solid gothic rock mixed with moving undulating layers of synths and moving dance beats."

In 2011, the track "In Your Arms Again" from the LP Darkest Hour was included on the soundtrack to David Fincher's The Girl with the Dragon Tattoo. In 2012, Moorings revisited early new wave and gothic rock inspirations on an album of covers entitled Kindred Spirits. 2014 saw the release of his studio album Matters Of Mind, Body And Soul, which explores Ronny's signature, melancholic sound. In 2018 and 2019, Moorings embarked on a world tour of its 2017 studio album Days of Black, including its first multi-date US tour in 20 years. In February 2020 the single "She" was released and reached number 1 on the DAC charts. It stayed 8 weeks non stop in the top 3. Clan Of Xymox had to break off their sold out tour in the USA and the rest of the world due to the Covid Crisis and a few months later the mids of it, the second single "Lovers" was released and stayed for 7 weeks non stop on the number 1 slot in the DAC charts.Both singles had a video made by Zoe Kavanagh from Dublin, Ireland. The third single "All I Ever Know" was accompanied with a video made by Ronny Moorings this time. The new album "Spider On The Wall" reached number 3 in the DAC charts. The same titled E.P. reached number 1 in the DAC charts November 2020. Cryptic Rock says: Spider on the Wall proves that the enduring Clan of Xymox has never lost its edge, dark beauty, and gloomy glamor.

== Personal life ==
Moorings was born in Roosendaal, Netherlands. After studying in the Den Haag Social Academy for one year, he moved to Nijmegen in 1979 to study Sociology at the University of Nijmegen (K.U.N) and then in 1983 Media Studies at the University of Amsterdam. Moorings moved to London in 1989 before moving back to Amsterdam in 1994, finally settling in Leipzig, Germany in 2005. Moorings is fluent in five languages. Moorings is a self-taught musician, stating in a 2012 interview "I bought my first synthesizers when I was 19. I never had any formal musical training. I still cannot read musical notes… I just like to follow my emotions and ears instead of looking at notes to see the theory behind it." Moorings has one child with longtime girlfriend Mojca Zugna, who has served as the Clan of Xymox bassist and graphic designer since the early 1990s.
