= Subsequent Pleasures =

EP by Clan of Xymox
- Released: 1983
- Genre: Post-punk, gothic rock, dark wave
- Label: Self-released
- Producer: Xymox

Clan of Xymox chronology
Subsequent Pleasures (1983)	Clan of Xymox (1985)

Subsequent Pleasures is the first extended play by Dutch dark wave band Clan of Xymox, self-released in 1983 on 12" vinyl under the band's original name Xymox.

It was limited to 500 copies. 150 sold immediately in Paris, 150 to Rough Trade (UK) and 150 to Germany and the remaining copies were sold in Amsterdam, the Netherlands. The EP was later reissued, bolstered with six additional demo tracks, by Pseudonym (1994, Benelux), Pandaimonium Records (2001, Germany) and Metropolis Records (2001, US). "Moscovite Musquito" was listed as "Muscoviet Musquito" on these reissues. In 2014, Dark Entries reissued the EP with only the original five tracks and correct naming of "Moscovite Musquito".

The original artwork and sleeve design were by Anke Wolbert, with all 500 copies screen-printed by hand.

== Track listing ==
No.	Title	Writer(s)	Length
1.	"Going Round"	Ronny Moorings	4:38
2.	"Moscovite Musquito"	Moorings, Pieter Nooten, Anka Wolbert	4:32
3.	"Strange 9 to 9"	Moorings	4:33
4.	"Call It Weird"	Moorings, Wolbert	3:50
5.	"Abysmal Thoughts"	Moorings	4:33
