= A Cloud of Ravens =

American gothic rock band

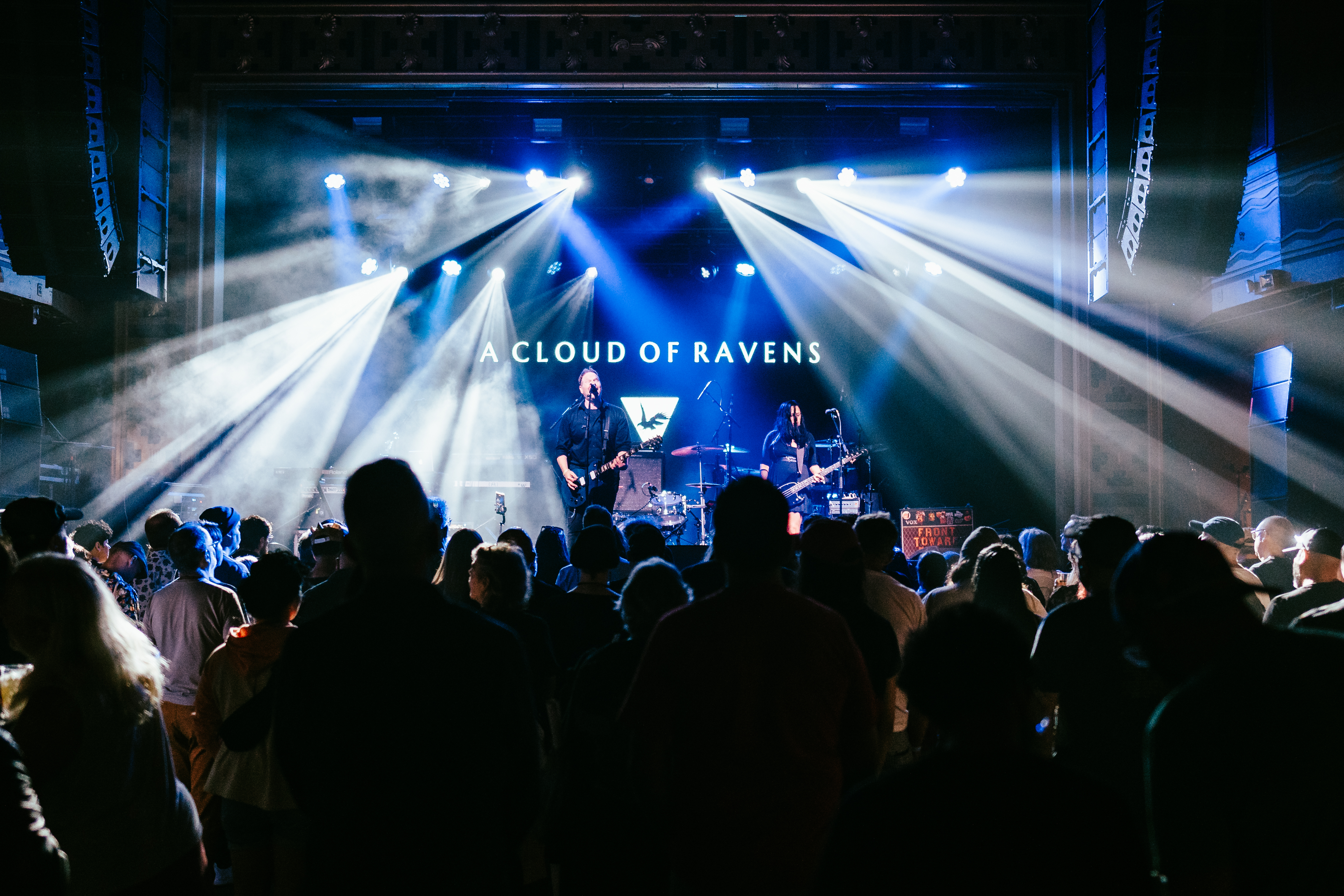
- A Cloud of Ravens at Webster Hall, New York City, 2024; from left to right: Matt McIntosh, Beth Narducci

Background information
- Origin: Brooklyn, New York, U.S.
- Genres: Gothic rock; post-punk; darkwave; alternative rock
- Years active: 2019–present
- Labels: Metropolis Records; Nexilis; Cleopatra Records
- Members: Matthew McIntosh; Beth Narducci

A Cloud of Ravens is an American rock duo, based in Brooklyn, New York, composed of Matthew McIntosh (guitar, vocals), and Beth Narducci (bass, vocals)

== History ==
McIntosh had self-released early A Cloud of Ravens songs as a solo project beginning a year prior to him and Narducci meeting at a bar in the Park Slope neighborhood of Brooklyn, NY, in the fall of 2019. After a quick bonding over the shared experiences of a Generation X-era upbringing, and similar musical interests, McIntosh would later share formative A Cloud of Ravens demos with Narducci, which would motivate the two to move forward with the project as a duo. Though McIntosh began writing for A Cloud of Ravens as early as 2018, he has stated that he did not consider it an actual band until he and Narducci partnered for the endeavor in 2020.

The duo signed a one-off deal with American independent label Cleopatra Records for the release of their 2021 full-length album Another Kind of Midnight, which garnered favorable reviews for the band's merging of classic and contemporary genre sensibilities, as well as the accompanying lyrics which reflected a world amidst a global pandemic, and polarized by political and moral tribalism.

In 2022 the band signed with Berlin-based imprint Nexilis, a subsidiary of Schubert Music Group EU, which released their next full-length effort Lost Hymns in April 2023.

Philadelphia-based independent label Metropolis Records licensed and reissued Lost Hymns in North America as Lost Hymns - Extended, nearly a year to the day from its initial release, with three new tracks largely written and recorded following the band's six week tour of Europe and North America, supporting Then Comes Silence, The Sisters of Mercy, and Clan of Xymox respectively.

In May 2023 A Cloud of Ravens were named in the article 10 New Goth And Darkwave Bands Keeping The Spirit Alive by Grammys.com, alongside other contemporary acts such as She Past Away, Drab Majesty, and Twin Tribes.

In August 2024 the duo supported first-wave Manchester, UK post-punk band The Chameleons for the northeast leg of their headlining US tour on which they performed, in-full, their classic second full-length album Strange Times (The Chameleons album).

== Musical style and influences ==
At their outset considered a component of the contemporaneous gothic rock resurgence, and often compared to legacy acts like The Sisters of Mercy, Bauhaus (band), and The Cult, A Cloud of Ravens’ subsequent output has moved successively toward an expanded foundation that includes elements of synth-pop, dance-punk, and modern rock. Their sound and aesthetic has been colloquialized by some as ‘urban gothic’.

The band have cited ELO, Prince, Fugazi, Killing Joke, Depeche Mode, The Clash, Tears for Fears, Samhain (band), Secession (band) Public Enemy, Simple Minds, and The Jesus and Mary Chain as influences. A Cloud of Ravens have covered songs by the Rolling Stones: "Sympathy for the Devil", and The Clash: "The Call Up", the latter with all proceeds going to benefit civilian victims of war-torn Ukraine.

McIntosh's lyrics have been characterized as "poetic", "intellectually intriguing" and as having "a philosophical tone", sometimes exploring socio-political structures, civil unrest, and environmental concerns, interwoven with vaguely romantic, and more metaphysical and spiritual-based themes.

Of Lost Hymns The Big Takeover Magazine said "The sound is shaded, edgy, underground to the point of being subterranean, a swirl of post-punk energies and gothic thrill, alt-rock urges, darkwave-dance grooves.... and majestic cinematic epics".

Alice Teeple of Post-punk.com noted "They seamlessly murmurate between the past and present, crafting a timeless sound. What sets A Cloud of Ravens apart is their willingness to take risks and push the boundaries of the genre by transcending time and space, speaking to the struggles and triumphs of the human experience".

== Discography ==
- Sacred Hearts EP (2018) self-released
- In the Wicked Hours (2019) self-released
- Another Kind of Midnight (2021) Cleopatra Records
- Lost Hymns (2023) Nexilis/Schubert Music Group
- Lost Hymns - Extended (2024) Metropolis Records | Nexilis
