= Medusa (Clan of Xymox album) =

Studio album by Clan of Xymox
- Released: November 1986
- Genres: Post-punk; gothic rock; dark wave
- Length: 42:18
- Label: 4AD
- Producers: Clan of Xymox and John Fryer

Clan of Xymox chronology
Clan of Xymox (1985)	Medusa (1986)	Twist of Shadows (1989)

Singles from Medusa
- 1. "Louise" / "Michelle" Released: December 1986

Medusa is the second studio album by Dutch dark wave band Clan of Xymox. It was released in November 1986 by 4AD. Founding member Pieter Nooten re-recorded the songs "After the Call" and "Theme I" on Sleeps with the Fishes, his 1987 collaborative album with Michael Brook, following a brief split from the band.

== Critical reception ==
Professional ratings
Review scores
Source	Rating
AllMusic	3/5 stars
Melody Maker	favourable
Sounds	favourable

Medusa is seen by some critics as the group's career high point. Sounds described Medusa as an "overriding achievement [...] every track sounds like the finale to a brooding epic overture".

Melody Maker wrote, "Sleek, efficient, even dramatic, Xymox understand the value of a direct understatement [...] [Medusa is] a bright flash of hope in these blackout days".

== Track listing ==
All tracks are written by Ronny Moorings, Pieter Nooten and Anka Wolbert.

No.	Title	Length
1.	"Theme I"	2:54
2.	"Medusa"	5:53
3.	"Michelle"	2:59
4.	"Theme II"	1:43
5.	"Louise"	5:17
6.	"Lorretine"	3:33
7.	"Agonised by Love"	5:18
8.	"Masquerade"	3:54
9.	"After the Call"	5:55
10.	"Back Door"	4:52

CD reissue bonus tracks
No.	Title	Length
11.	"Blind Hearts"	4:19
12.	"A Million Things"	4:37
13.	"Scum (Dance Mix)"	7:12

== Personnel ==
- Ronny Moorings – vocals, guitar, keyboards
- Anka Wolbert – vocals, keyboards, bass guitar
- Pieter Nooten – vocals, keyboards

Technical

- John Fryer – production, engineering
- Keith Mitchell – engineering
- Vaughan Oliver – sleeve graphic design
- Nigel Grierson – sleeve photography
