= Lesburlesque =

British burlesque troupe

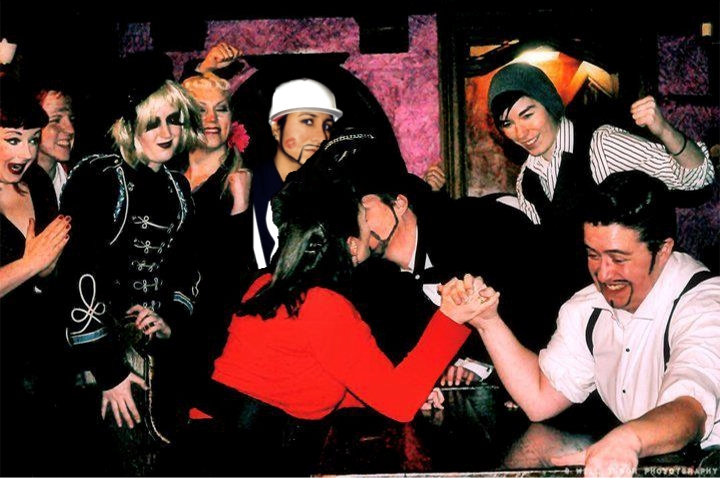
- Lesburlesque & Drag Kings
- Genre: Burlesque
- Show type: Lesbian Cabaret
- Location: Manchester, London, United Kingdom

Creative team
- Founder: Pixie Truffle
- Co-Founder: Kitty Liquor
- Compère: Rosie Lugosi
- Original Members: Isobella Lash, Mona Von Chrome, Twiggy StarLust, Willow Rose, Delilah Cherryblossom
- Performers: Khandie Khisses, Diva Hollywood, Marnie Scarlet, Mia Merode, Lady Wildflower, Aurora Galore, Fifi Fatale, TeTe Bang, Chocolat the Extraordinaire, Nanny Dora, Laureat O'Hara, Penny Bizarre, Tottie Spon Sills, Luna Rosa, Glorian Gray, Emerald Ace, Daria D'Beauvoix, Heidi Bang Tidy, Lily La Fox, The Wonderful D, Bella Besame, Ruby Moon Voodoo, Fever Blister, Kitten De Ville

Other information
- Drag King Performers: Jack The-Lad, Alex Valentine, Juan Kerr, George de Michael, Gent Lee Duzzit, Jack Toffington-Spiffingfellow, Rusty Chrome, Dixie Shuffle
- Official website

Lesburlesque is a British troupe of over thirty burlesque performers that perform on the cabaret circuit. They are notable for being the first and only burlesque troupe in the UK that performs lesbian burlesque. Following on from the success of Los Angeles-based girl band and dance troupe, the Pin Up Girls, Lesburlesque appeared on the burlesque scene in September 2010. They came to wider public attention in 2012 for having performed at a former church and continue to incorporate traditionally lesbian specific cabaret entertainment, such as drag kinging to broadening its appeal to the wider cabaret circuit.

== History ==
Lesburlesque is a British burlesque and dance troupe, founded by lesbian cabaret performer Pixie Truffle in 2010. The troupe began as a duet burlesque routine idea, but following favourable responses from established burlesque performers Kitty Liquor, Mona Von Chrome, Isobella Lash and March Violets vocalist Rosie Garland, aka Rosie Lugosi, Pixie dedicated herself to making Lesburlesque into a fully fledged cabaret group.

The press in Manchester seemed supportive of their efforts to expand the concept of burlesque to the LGBTQ community and to render sapphic art forms such as drag kinging available to a larger audience.

The troupe continue to use established drag king performers The Dyke Kings and Juan Kerr. Lesburlesque and Pixie continue to spearhead the rise to equality of drag king performance art. In an exchange between Pixie and actress and feminist writer Rhona Foulis, Pixie claims it is "...her personal mission to bring lesbian performances to a mainstream audience, in exactly the same way as drag queens have been accepted."

== Associations ==
The troupe continues to be associated with the Lesbian Community Project, a charitable organisation that helps to put lesbians in touch with each other across Manchester and to provide counselling and fun activities.

On their first anniversary Pixie Truffle formed a one off partnership with Bella Besame, the founder and promoter of The Slippery Belle Presents...BURLESQUE! revue in Manchester.

On their second anniversary Pixie announced a partnership with The Singapore Burlesque Club, a well-known Burlesque revue in Singapore. Singapore is a country with stringent controls on public nudity and the Burlesque Club's stance, and association with a Lesbian Burlesque troupe, would at the very least be at odds with the state of women's rights and gay rights in its native Singapore.

== Performances ==
- Grrrl Meets Boi, The Lesbian Community Project, Manchester (26 February 2011)
- The Slippery Belle Presents...Lesburlesque! (2 March 2012)
- Lesburlesque Presents Sapphic Pride (25 August 2012)
- Lesburlesque Presents... In Association with The Singapore Burlesque Club ....INTERNATIONAL ENCHANTRESS NIGHT with Burlesque Legend Kitten De Ville (13 October 2012)

== See also ==
- List of drag groups
