= Tom Ashton =

English musician, producer and film composer

Tom Ashton is a musician, producer and film composer. He is also an original founder member and guitarist of early 1980s British gothic rock/post-punk band The March Violets. Based in Leeds, England, the band released many tracks which went on to be rated as classics of their genre. He also guested in bands The Sisters of Mercy, The Danse Society and toured and recorded with Clan of Xymox. As a side project to The Violets, he also co-wrote and recorded the first album from The Batfish Boys, The Gods Hate Kansas.

In 1987 his music was featured in director John Hughes' coming of age drama, Some Kind of Wonderful. A year later he co-wrote the score for Zelda Barron's teen thriller, The Bulldance, during his stint in London Records band Hard Rain.

Throughout the 1990s he was based in London and played in various bands, including Amania, with ex-Violets singer Cleo Murray and Craig Adams and also Bully, with Australian singer/songwriter/actress Abi Tucker.

After reforming in 2007, The March Violets released their first proper studio album in 2013, Made Glorious. The band also toured extensively in the US and Europe.

In 2012 he returned to film scoring and completed 8 features with director Daniel E. Falicki and two shorts for director Ryan Lieske. In 2016 he embarked on an audio re-imagining of E. Elias Merhige's Begotten in tandem with its director. This is still a work in progress.

In 2016 he founded SubVon Studio based in Athens, Georgia and since then has recorded, mixed, and mastered many Georgia based darkwave bands including Vision Video, Tears for the Dying, Hip To Death and Entertainment!

== Discography ==
=== Studio albums ===
- Made Glorious (2013, self-released)
- Mortality (2015, self-released)
- The Gods Hate Kansas (1985, Batfish Incorporated)

=== Singles and EPs ===
- "Religious as Hell" 7" (1982, Merciful Release)
- "Grooving in Green" 7" (1982, Merciful Release)
- "Crow Baby" 7"/12" (1983, Rebirth)
- "Snake Dance" 7"/12" (1984, Rebirth)
- "Walk into the Sun" 7"/12" (1984, Rebirth)
- "Swamp Liquor" (1985, Batfish Incorporated)
- "Deep" 7"/12" (1985, Rebirth)
- "Turn to the Sky" 7"/12" (1986, Rebirth)
- "Spiritual High / Wild Is The Wind" CD (1993, Zok Records)
- Trinity EP CD EP (2007, self-released)
- Love Will Kill You CD EP (2011, self-released)

=== Compilation albums ===
- Natural History (1984, Rebirth)
- Electric Shades (1985, Relativity Records)
- The Botanic Verses (1993, Jungle Records/Cleopatra Records)

== Filmography ==
- "Some Kind Of Wonderful (1987) dir John Hughes.
- "Forbidden Sun (a.k.a. The Bulldance) (1989) dir Zelda Barron.
- "Abed (2012) dir Ryan Lieske.
- "The Last Vampyre On Earth (2013) dir Daniel E. Falicki.
- "Devils In The Darkness (2013) dir Daniel E. Falicki.
- "An Anti American (2013) dir Daniel E. Falicki.
- "The Joe Show (2014) dir Daniel E. Falicki.
- "Remotion (Prologue) (2014) dir Ryan Lieske.
- "Shadow World (The Haunting Of Mysti Delane) (2014) dir Daniel E. Falicki.
- "3:33 AM (2014) dir Daniel E. Falicki.
- "Accidental Exorcist (2016) dir Daniel E. Falicki
- "13 Demons (2016) dir Daniel E. Falicki
