= Sun (German band) =

- Origin: Mönchengladbach, Germany
- Genres: Crossover; Alternative rock Grunge; Progressive rock
- Years active: 1991–2001
- Label: Gun Records
- Members: Jörg Schröder; Ralf Aussem; Bogdan Skrowonek; Holger Seeling; Peter Körfer; Jörg Schneider; Björn Lucker; Kurt Schmidt

Sun was an Alternative rock band from Mönchengladbach, Germany with English lyrics and styles described as Crossover and Progressive rock.

The band was founded in 1991 by Ralf Aussem, Bogdan Skrowonek and Jörg Schröder. Sun was considered for long time on critics as "German answer" of Pearl Jam or Tool. Furthermore, the band supported Pearl Jam on their Ten Release Tour in 1992 and also Monster Magnet in the year 1995.

Two years after founding their band they got their Majordeal on the label Gun Records. The band became good known by their albums Murdernature, XXXX and Nitro as also by co-projects for sequels of the serial rock sampler Crossing All Over. Further, the band used instruments atypical of rock, like English flutes.

In the year 2001 the band split up after different exchanges of bandmembers and severe illness of their singer. Their founder and musicwriter Ralf Aussem plays currently in the Scottish/German band Dead Guitars

== Members ==
- Ralf Aussem (songwriting, guitar) - founder of Sun
- Jörg Schröder (vocals) and founder of Sun
- Bogdan Skowronek (drums) and founder of Sun
- Holger Seeling (bass)
- Peter Körfer (guitar)
- Jörg Schneider (drums)
- Björn Lucker (drums)
- Kurt Schmidt (bass)

== Discography ==
- 1991 - Urban Glowing
- 1992 - Murdernature
- 1993 - Jam House Wah
- 1994 - XXXX
- 1996 - Nitro
- 1998 - Launches (Best Of)
- 2001 - Sun

== As support band ==
- for Pearl Jam (1992)
- for Monster Magnet (1995)
