= Total Mayhem (video game) =

1996 video game

- Developer(s): Cinematix
- Publisher(s): Domark
- Platform(s): Windows, Windows 3.x
- Release: NA: May 21, 1996
- Genre(s): Shooter
- Mode(s): Single-player

Total Mayhem is an isometric action video game developed by American studio Cinematix and published by Domark in 1996 for Windows. It featured music by Ronny Moorings of the band Clan of Xymox.

== Gameplay ==
Total Mayhem is a game in which the player commands units on missions to destroy robots.

== Reception ==
Next Generation reviewed the PC version of the game, rating it two stars out of five, and stated that "There are plenty of missions, some interesting weapons, and a variety of enemies, which, along with network support, keeps Total Mayhem from being a total loss, but it's certainly not enough to make this one a legend."
