= Rosie Garland =

British novelist, poet, singer (born 1960)

Rosie Garland FRSL
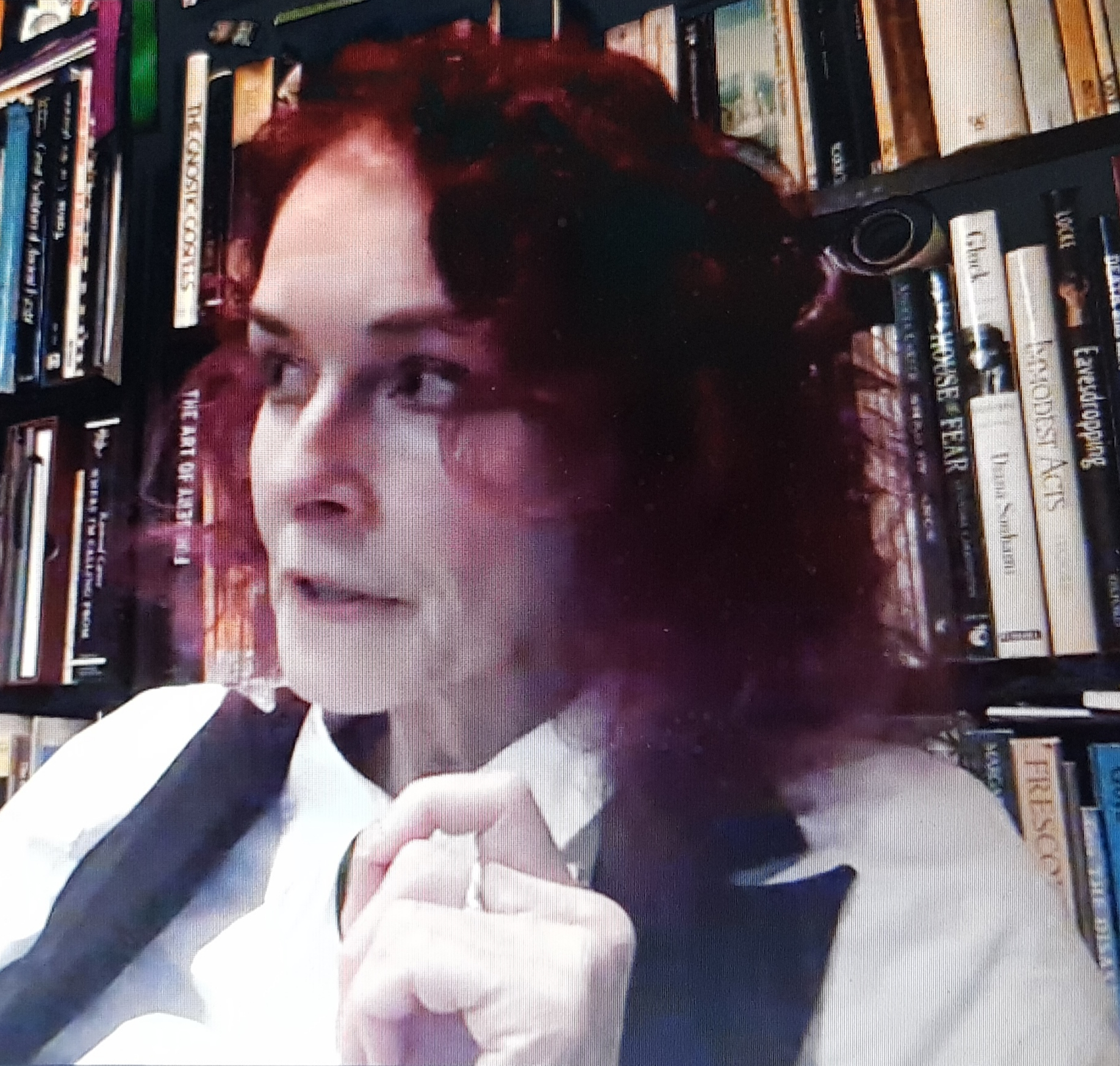
- Garland reading her poetry at an online event in 2021
- Born: 8 May 1960 (age 66); London, England
- Other name: Rosie Lugosi
- Education: University of Leeds
- Occupations: Novelist, poet, singer
- Parent(s): William Garland (father) Mary Garland (née Metcalfe, mother)
- Website: www.rosiegarland.com

Rosie Garland FRSL (born 1960) is a British novelist, poet and singer with post-punk band The March Violets. In 2023, she was elected a Fellow of the Royal Society of Literature.

== Life ==
Born in London on 8 May 1960, she was adopted as a baby by her mother Mary Garland (née Metcalfe) and father William Garland, spending her childhood living in Hampshire, Somerset, Devon and Hertfordshire. In 1978, aged 18, she moved to Yorkshire to study at the University of Leeds, graduating with a BA Hons in English Special Studies and an MA (with distinction) in Medieval English Studies. In 1981 she joined The March Violets. During 1984 to 1986 she worked as an English teacher in Sudan. From 2001 she was the victim of a stalker, with the 2007 court case featured as a lead article in the Manchester Evening News. In 2009 she was diagnosed with throat cancer and successfully treated at The Christie Hospital in Manchester.

== Career ==
She has published seven solo collections of poetry. As a performance poet, she has often given readings as her alter-ego Rosie Lugosi, Lesbian Vampire Queen and has performed on the cabaret circuit in British troupe Lesburlesque. In 2001 she won the Performance Artist category in the Sexual Freedom Awards.

Her debut novel The Palace of Curiosities won the inaugural Mslexia Novel Competition in 2012 and was published by HarperCollins. This work is set in a Victorian freak show, where the central character Eve has hypertrichosis, a condition where the entire body is covered in hair. This was followed by a second novel, Vixen and a third novel The Night Brother, which is set in her adopted city of Manchester.

In 2018 she became inaugural Writer-in-Residence at The John Rylands Library, Manchester. In 2019 she was selected by Val McDermid, who had been asked by the National Centre for Writing and the British Council to choose ten writers to showcase the quality and breadth of LGBTQI+ writers working in the UK.

== Awards ==
- 2012: Winner, Mslexia Novel Competition
- 2013: Winner, Cooperative Bank "Loved By You" LGBT Book of the Year 2013

== Works ==
=== Poetry ===
- Hell and Eden (Dagger Press, 1997)
- Creatures of the Night (purpleprosepress, 2003)
- Coming Out at Night (purpleprosepress, 2005)
- Things I Did While I Was Dead, 2010, ISBN 978-0955509254
- Everything Must Go, 2012, ISBN 978-1907320224
- As In Judy, 2016, ISBN 978-0995501201
- What Girls Do In The Dark, 2020, ISBN 978-1-913437-05-3
- This Is How I Fight (ninearchespress, 2024) ISBN 978-1-916760-18-9

=== Novels ===
- The Palace of Curiosities, 2013, ISBN 978-0007492787
- Vixen, 2015, ISBN 978-0007492800
- The Night Brother, 2017, ISBN 978-0008166106
- The Fates, 2024, ISBN 978-1529428124

== Reviews ==
- Judith Flanders (6 April 2013). "The Palace of Curiosities by Rosie Garland – review". The Guardian.
- Claire Booker (5 January 2017). "As in Judy: Rosie Garland, Flapjack". Write Out Loud.
- Dr Claire Nally (28 July 2018). "'The Night Brother' by Rosie Garland – guest review". The Blogging Goth.
- Juliano Zaffino (15 October 2020). "What Girls Do in the Dark by Rosie Garland". Lunate Fiction.
