= The Batfish Boys =

English rock group (active 1984–1990)

- Origin: Leeds/York, England
- Genres: Gothic rock; swamp rock; post-punk; hard rock
- Years active: 1984–1990
- Labels: Batfish; GWR
- Members: Simon "Detroit" Denbigh; Loz Elliott; Tom Ashton; Martin "Bomber" Pink; Bob "Diablo" Priestley; Murray Fenton; Johnny Burman; Zero Rek (Martin Herbert)

The Batfish Boys (later simply called Batfish) were an English rock band from York and Leeds, England, active between 1984 and 1990. They released three albums.

== History ==
The band was formed by former March Violets vocalist Simon Detroit (b. Simon Denbigh) and ex-Skeletal Family drummer Martin "Bomber" Pink, initially assisted on their first single, 1985's "Swamp Liquor" (their first release on their own Batfish Incorporated label) by Denbigh's ex-bandmates in March Violets, bassist Loz Elliott and guitarist Tom Ashton. Their goth tendencies evolved into a more Stooges-influenced garage rock sound, and debut album The Gods Hate Kansas prompted comparisons to the likes of The Cramps and The Gun Club. By that point, the band had added bassist Bob "Diablo" Priestley and guitarists Johnny Burman and Murray Fenton.

In 1986, Zero Rek (Martin Herbert) replaced Fenton on guitar. The Batfish Boys' second album, Head, also appeared that year, laced with psychedelic blues overtones. With the band's sound getting progressively heavier, they were signed by Motörhead's label, GWR, in 1987, and shortened their name to Batfish. The first release on GWR was 1988's "Purple Dust" single, a mash-up cover of "Purple Haze" and Queen's "Another One Bites the Dust".

The third Batfish Boys album, Batfish Brew, was released in 1989, but the band split shortly afterwards.

Denbigh, who later issued an album under the name D-Rok, and reformed the March Violets in 2007, was declared Cult Hero No. 36 by Classic Rock Magazine in 2010.

== Musical style and influences ==
The Batfish Boys' early music was classified as gothic rock, post-punk and swamp rock, as well as grebo, before they changed their style to a hard rock, psychedelic blues and arena metal sound. The band, however, resisted classifying themselves as "goth" or "grebo".

== Discography ==
Chart placings shown are from the UK Indie Chart.

=== Studio albums ===
- The Gods Hate Kansas (1985, Batfish Incorporated)
- Head (1986, Batfish Incorporated) (No. 16)
- Batfish Brew (1989, GWR Records)

=== Singles and EPs ===
- "Swamp Liquor" (1985, Batfish Incorporated) (No. 22)
- Crocodile Tears EP (1986, Batfish Incorporated)
- "Justine" (1986, Batfish Incorporated) (No. 16)
- "The Bomb Song" (1987, Batfish Incorporated) (No. 18)
- "Purple Dust" (1988, GWR Records)

=== Compilation albums ===
- Lurve: Some Kind of Flashback (1987, Twilight Records)
