= Dead Guitars =

Rock band

- Origin: Scotland, Germany, Netherlands, Russia,
- Genres: Indie rock, alternative rock, new wave
- Years active: 2003-present
- Label: Echozone / silverbird music
- Members: Carlo van Putten; Ralf Aussem; Pete Brough; Sven-Olaf Dirks; Patrick Schmitz
- Website: www.deadguitars.com http://www.myspace.com/deadguitars

Dead Guitars is a German pop band. The band first formed in 2003, when guitarist Peter Brough of 12 Drummers Drumming joined forces with Carlo van Putten of The Convent and White Rose Transmission, and were later joined by guitarist Ralf Aussem.

== History ==
In 2003 Pete Brough, one of the founder-members of German band Twelve Drummers Drumming, and Ralf Aussem, guitarist of Twelve Drummers Drumming cast and founder of Sun (German band), joined with vocalist Carlo van Putten and formed Dead Guitars.

The music of Dead Guitars is described as an amalgamation of downbeats, saturated electro-acoustic guitar work, and vocals that reflect an incisiveness and emotional intelligence.

- Release of debut-album "Airplanes" June 2007 (echozone).
- UK-release of "Flags"-album in January 2009, in Germany in March/April 2009 (echozone).

Dead Guitars were invited by "The Mission-UK" in 2008 to play as special guests on their “European Tour”.

Dead Guitars also played a number of 2011-dates with The Mission in the Netherlands and Germany. In 2012 Dead Guitars supported the "ChameleonsVox" feat. Mark Burgess on several shows in Germany.

== Current band members ==
- Carlo van Putten: Vocals
- Ralf Aussem: Guitars
- Peter Brough: Acoustic Guitars
- Kurt Schmidt: Bass
- Hermann Eugster: Drums

== Former band members ==
- Sven-Olaf Dirks: Bass
- Patrick Schmitz: Drums
- Peter Körfer: Bass

== Albums ==
- 2007 - Airplanes (debut album)
- 2008 - Feels alright (EP)
- 2009 - Flags (album)
- 2011 - Mesmerized (EP)
- 2011 - Stranger (album)
- 2015 - Shelter (album)
