= Poured Out =

American metalcore band

- Origin: Hollywood, Maryland
- Genres: Metalcore; Christian hardcore; Christian metalcore
- Years active: 2014–2017
- Labels: Facedown
- Members: Randy Lyvers(divorced); Ridge Rhine; Grant Johnstone; Matt Dooley
- Website: facebook.com/pouredoutmd

Poured Out are an American metalcore band from Hollywood, Maryland, and they started making music together in 2014, playing hardcore punk and metalcore. They have released one extended play, Blind Heart (2016), with Facedown Records.

== Background ==
The band originated from Hollywood, Maryland, where they were formed in 2014, with vocalist Randy Lyvers, guitarist Ridge Rhine, bassist Grant Johnstone, and drummer Matt Dooley.

== Music history ==
The band signed with Facedown Records, on March 18, 2016, where they re-released their debut extended play, Blind Heart, on April 8, 2016.

Poured Out released their debut full-length album, To The Point of Death, on April 8, 2016.

On March 8, 2017, Poured Out announced that they would be disbanding after three years of making music. In a statement on Facebook, the band expressed gratitude for "everyone and everything that has helped us follow our dream," saying that they their hope is that "in some way our music has helped you, influenced you, sparked change, or just made you want to give your all at a show."

== Members ==
Current members

- Randy Lyvers – vocals
- Ridge Rhine – guitar
- Grant Johnstone – bass (2014-2017)
- Matt Dooley – drums (2014-2017)

Former members

- Josh "Dime Callin Edge Breakin" Haynes - vocals
- Ian Gilchrist - guitar

== Discography ==
EPs

- Blind Heart (April 8, 2016, Facedown)
- Inner Poverty (December 12, 2014)

Studio albums

- To the Point of Death (October 21, 2016, Facedown Records)

Singles

- "Remember Me" (September 1, 2016)
