= Revenant (video game) =

1999 isometric action role-playing game by Eidos Interactive

- Developer: Cinematix Studios
- Publisher: Eidos Interactive
- Composers: Victor J. Palagano III; Patrick J. Collins; Ronny Moorings
- Platform: Windows
- Release: NA: October 26, 1999; EU: November 12, 1999
- Genre: Action role-playing
- Modes: Single-player, multiplayer

Revenant is an action role-playing video game developed by Cinematix Studios and published by Eidos Interactive for Microsoft Windows in 1999.

Set on the island of Ahkuilon, the game follows Locke D'Averam, a revenant raised from the dead and compelled to rescue a kidnapped princess while uncovering his own forgotten past as an ancient king. The game features a real-time combat system that supports mouse, keyboard, and gamepad controls, including the ability to chain attacks into combos and combine talismans to cast magic spells.

Revenant received above-average reviews, with scores from major outlets generally ranging from 7 to 8 out of 10, and sold approximately 37,000 units in the United States by March 2000.

== Plot ==
Most of the game takes place in the fictional town of Misthaven and around the island of Ahkuilon. Locke D'Averam is a revenant who is named after the House of Averam, which raised him from the dead. Immediately after being brought back from Anserak (Hell), Locke is sent on a quest by his new master, Sardok, who is the magical advisor to Lord Tendrick, ruler of the island. The quest is to locate and rescue Tendricks' long-missing daughter, the Princess Andria, who was kidnapped by a mysterious cult calling itself the Children of the Change that has been steadily taking over the island through control magic, taking control of various humans and other beings and creatures to bolster their ranks. Locke, under the magical control of Sardok as a revenant, has no choice but to accept the quest, in exchange for his freedom. The cult that Locke finds himself facing is led by a mysterious and powerful demon known as Yhagoro.

It is revealed gradually that Locke was once king of an ancient empire that centered on Ahkuilon. Locke made a pact with a demon god called Kraxxus, of whom Yhagoro is a disciple attempting to resurrect him, but he could not bear the price, his wife's soul damned for eternity, and refused to sacrifice her. The demon god condemned Locke to an eternity of suffering in Anserak and his mighty empire was destroyed and pulled into the earth. The Princess Andria is revealed to be the reincarnation of Locke's lost Queen, and she has been kidnapped to complete the sacrifice to Kraxxus, though the cult must first locate the demonic power known as the Nahkranoth in order to do so.

As he explores Ahkuilon in pursuit of the missing Andria, Locke must face enemies and make allies against the Children of the Change. He allies with the Ogroks, slays Jhaga and Sabu, two ranking sorcerers in the cult, and frees the Druhg slaves from their grasp. Many characters in the game hint there is a "darkness" surrounding Locke and some seem to know of his past, including the mysterious sorcerer named Olihoot, who guides Locke through his journey and helps him rediscover his past. As the story builds to a climax, it becomes apparent that not all is as it seems and that history may repeat itself, with Locke finding and being imbued with the demonic power of the Nahkranoth, and steadily becoming unhinged by it, frightening many of the folk of Misthaven.

Sardok is revealed to be a traitor with an agenda of his own, murdering Olihoot as well as Lord Tendrick, before sending Locke back to Anserak to locate and slay Yhagoro and free the Princess Andria. Eventually Locke is able to defeat the cult and prevails in a fierce duel against Yhagoro, freeing the Princess from his grasp as well as those beings magically enslaved by the cult. Sardok appears as the husband and wife are reunited after ten thousand years, and murders Andria with a sacrificial dagger before attempting to take full control of Locke for his own purposes. In his rage, Locke is able to purge himself of the Nahkranoth, unleashing its power on Sardok instead and killing him.

In the end, free from Sardok's control at last, a grim, heartbroken and silent Locke picks up, cradles and carries his fallen beloved back to the portal to Ahkuilon.

== Gameplay ==
Revenant's combat system changes in accordance with the control method used. Locke can be controlled with the mouse to perform standard attacks with minimal player input. In addition, the player can use the keyboard for finer control, gaining access to three basic attack types and the ability to chain them into special combos, some of which result in special death animations. These specialized kill moves are enemy-specific and range from crushing spiders with a stomp to beheading hostile swordsmen. A gamepad or joystick can also be used in a similar way to the keyboard method, with nearly every move or command able to be mapped to buttons or button combinations. In addition to permanent upgrades to his attributes like strength and agility, Locke gains extra fighting abilities after a level threshold has been reached. It is also possible to combine certain movements into a fluid cycle of attacks.

In addition to melee combat, a number of talismans can be combined to cast magic spells. Combinations can be found in scrolls. Spells vary from freezing to poisoning, and some spells lock opponents in place, allowing Locke to combine a magical attack with a special combat move.

Bows cannot be found as commonly in the single-player game but are readily available in multiplayer, giving players the ability to engage in ranged combat.

== Development ==
Revenant underwent three name changes during development. It was first announced under the title Forsaken: The Thrall of Chaos. The graphics were developed with Direct3D. The game was originally planned to be single-player-only. Over 20 people worked on the game.

== Reception ==
Reception

Aggregate score
Aggregator	Score
GameRankings	74%

Review scores
Publication	Score
AllGame	3/5
CNET Gamecenter	7/10
Computer Games Strategy Plus	3/5
Computer Gaming World	3/5
EP Daily	7.5/10
Eurogamer	7/10
GameRevolution	B−
GameSpot	7/10
GameSpy	90%
IGN	8.3/10
Next Generation	3/5
PC Accelerator	6/10
PC Gamer (UK)	82%
RPGFan	87%

Revenant received above-average reviews according to the review aggregation website GameRankings. Jim Preston of NextGen said, "Diablo fans who need a quick fix will enjoy it, but it doesn't do much to transcend its genre."

The game sold 37,000 units in the U.S. by March 2000; GameSpot's writer P. Stephan "Desslock" Janicki noted the game "sold quite poorly".
