= Blind Heart (EP) =

EP by Poured Out
- Released: April 8, 2016
- Genre: Christian hardcore; Christian metalcore; hardcore punk; metalcore
- Length: 20:46
- Label: Facedown

Blind Heart is the first extended play from American metalcore band Poured Out. Facedown Records released the EP on April 8, 2016.

== Critical reception ==
Professional ratings
Review scores
Source	Rating
Jesus Freak Hideout	4.5/5 stars 4/5 stars
New-Transcendence	7.5/10 stars

Scott Fryberger states, "it's easy to see the potential. Their brand of raw and slightly unconventional hardcore make for a well-spent twenty minutes". Wayne Reimer writes, "within the Christian music scene, it's a real treat." Conner Welsh says, "Blind Heart is about as diverse as one can expect from a nineties-style metalcore band, delivering two-steps and riffs by the boatload without filler or thoughtlessness of any kind. While the band leave a little to be desired in the way of both run time and vocal diversity, that doesn’t stop their label debut from being devastating and dynamic in its own way—far from hollow and still very full of life."

== Track listing ==
No.	Title	Length
1.	"Unconditional"	3:17
2.	"American Justice"	4:15
3.	"Hymn of a Broken Man"	5:22
4.	"Poured Out"	3:58
5.	"Beloved"	3:57
Total length:		20:46
