= She Past Away =

Turkish post-punk band

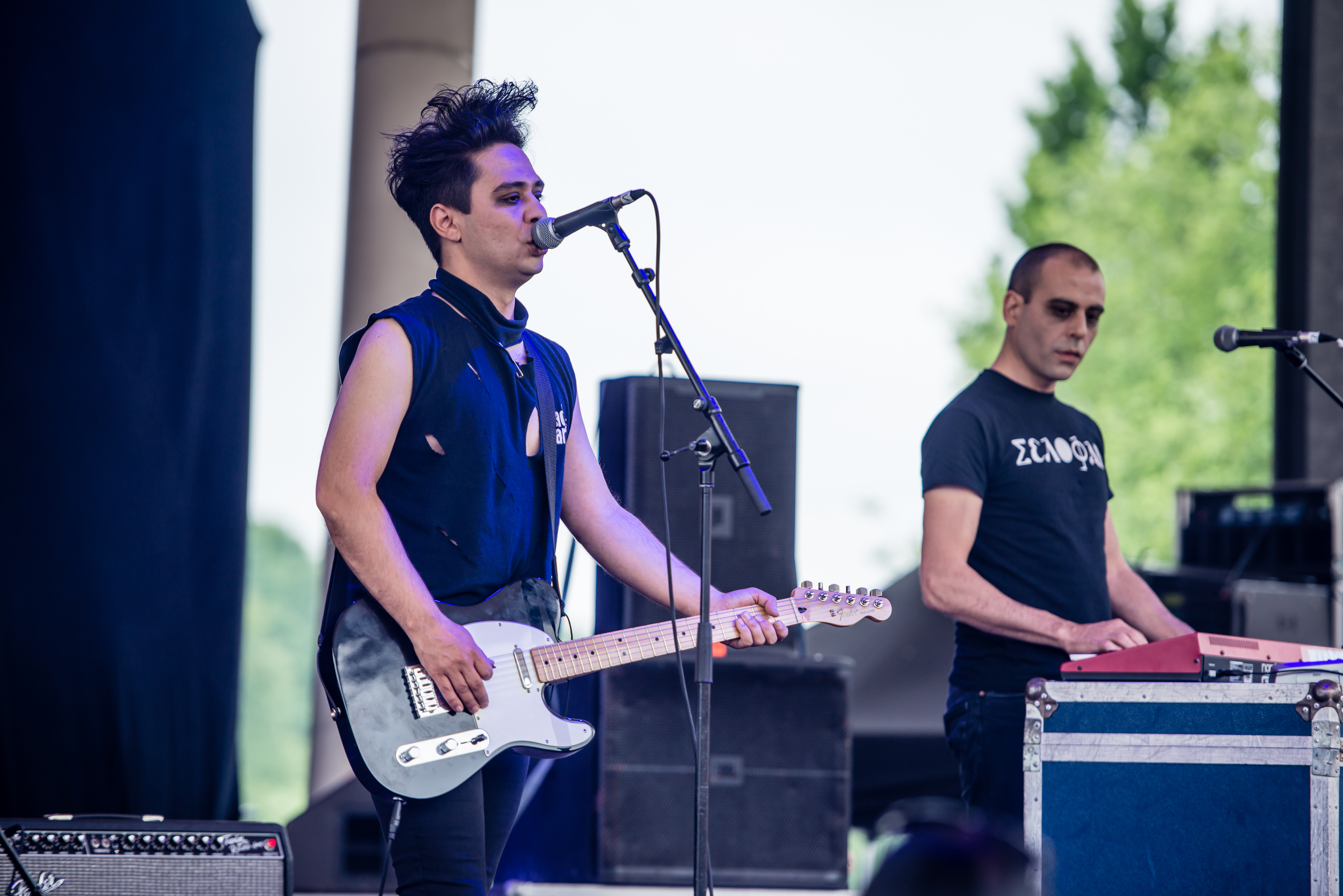
- She Past Away in 2015

Background information
- Origin: Bursa, Turkey
- Genres: Post-punk; dark wave
- Years active: 2006–present
- Labels: Metropolis Records, Fabrika Records, Remoov Records
- Members: Volkan Caner; Doruk Öztürkcan
- Past members: İdris Akbulut
- Website: shepastaway.org

She Past Away is a Turkish post-punk band, formed in 2006. The band was formed in Bursa by Volkan Caner (vocals and guitar) and İdris Akbulut (bass guitar). The band is known for their dark wave musical style with post-punk roots and the gothic image of the band members.

In December 2018, in an interview with an independent music web magazine, Doruk Öztürkcan announced the release of a new album in 2019 and a subsequent US tour.

On May 31, 2019, they digitally released their third album "Disko Anksiyete", based mainly on disco sounds, but which does not abandon the typical sound of the duo.

== Formation and History ==
She Past Away was formed in Bursa, Turkey in 2006. They released their first EP Kasvetli Kutlama in 2010 with the collaboration of Doruk "Süpermatik" Öztürkcan. They released their first album, Belirdi Gece, in 2012 with Fabrika Records, the Athens-based record company that had been working with other new dark wave acts such as Lebanon Hanover.

In 2015, bass guitarist İdris Akbulut left the band and Doruk Öztürkcan, the producer of the band, joined as the keyboard player.

== Musical style ==
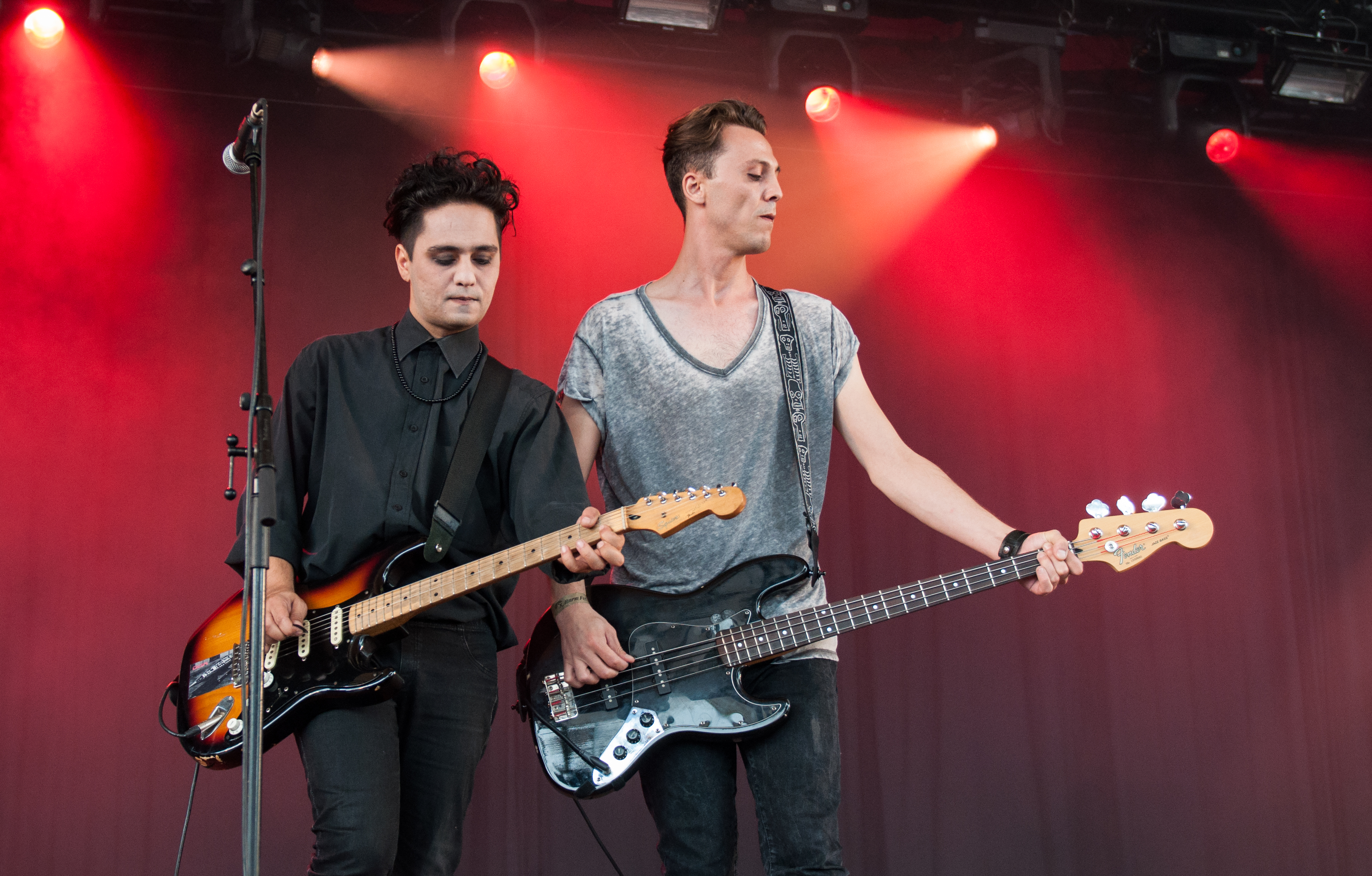
She Past Away, 2014: Volkan Caner and former member İdris Akbulut

The band has a post-punk, new wave and gothic rock sound, inspired by musical acts such as The Sisters of Mercy, Asylum Party, Death in June, Clan of Xymox, DAF, Siouxsie and the Banshees of the 1980s. The first record of She Past Away had a more guitar and bass-focused style, they later switched to a more electronic sound. Their style was also compared to other old acts such as Joy Division, Depeche Mode, Bauhaus and Suicide.

The members explained that erotic horror movies had also inspired their dark aesthetics.

== Band members ==
Current members

- Volkan Caner – guitars, vocals (2006–present)
- Doruk Öztürkcan – keyboards, drum machine (2015–present)

Former members

- İdris Akbulut – bass (2006–2015)

== Discography ==
=== Studio albums ===
- Belirdi Gece (2012) Remoov / Fabrika Records
- Narin Yalnızlık (2015) Remoov / Fabrika Records
- Disko Anksiyete (2019) Remoov / Metropolis Records / Fabrika Records
- Mizantrop (2026)

=== Live Albums ===
- Part Time Punks (2020) Fabrika Records

=== Tribute albums ===
- X (2020) Metropolis / Fabrika Records

=== EP ===
- Kasvetli Kutlama (2010) Remoov

=== Singles ===
- Excess (2021) Blood Music, with Perturbator
- İnziva (2024)
