= Frogs (video game) =

1978 video game

- North American arcade flyer
- Developer: Gremlin Industries
- Publishers: NA: Gremlin Industries; JP: Sega
- Designer: Lane Hauck
- Platform: Arcade
- Release: NA: October 1978; JP: November 1978
- Genre: Action
- Mode: Single-player

Frogs is a 1978 action video game developed and published by Gremlin Industries for arcades. It featured a jumping character (predating Donkey Kong by three years) with graphics "projected" by laying the monitor flat on its back and reflecting the computer-generated graphics of the frogs and flies toward the player via a mirror at a 45-degree angle. The game's graphics were actually generated and shown backward, so the mirror reflection would show letters and numbers properly. The game was distributed by Sega in Japan.

== Gameplay ==

The player controls a frog on lilypads and attempts to catch (with the frog's tongue and while jumping) various insects (butterflies and dragonflies) worth different numbers of points in a set amount of time.

== Legacy ==
In 1980, Adventure International published a similar game with varying names–Frog, Frogs, Frog on a Log–for the TRS-80. In this version the player controls a large frog that moves left or right along a log.

Mattel released Frogs and Flies for the Atari 2600, which was renamed Frog Bog for the Intellivision version. Both were published in 1982.
