= Frog Bog =

1982 video game

- Intellivision box art by Jerrol Richardson
- Developer: APH Technological Consulting
- Publisher: Mattel Electronics
- Programmers: Peter Kaminski; Tom Soulanille
- Platforms: Intellivision, Atari 2600
- Release: Intellivision: May 25, 1982; 2600: October 1982
- Genre: Action
- Modes: Single-player, multiplayer

Frog Bog is a 1982 action video game released by Mattel Electronics for the Intellivision. An Atari 2600 conversion was released later that year as Frogs and Flies. In both games, each player controls a frog sitting on a lily pad, attempting to eat more flies than the other. Frog Bog is similar to the 1978 Sega-Gremlin arcade game Frogs.

== Gameplay ==
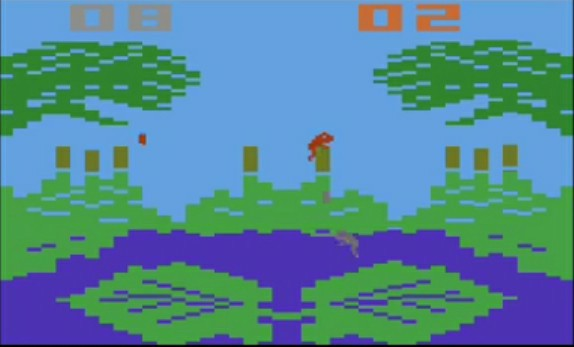
Atari 2600 gameplay

Each game starts out in the morning with a light blue sky. If there is not a second player, the system will automatically take control of the red frog within a few seconds. Each frog jumps from one lily pad to the other. During each hop, a number of flies fly around the screen. The player pushes the fire button, which causes the frog's tongue to stick out. If the frog is in the right spot ahead or behind a fly, it catches and eats the fly. Each time a fly is captured, it is worth two points. The game progresses throughout the day, with the sky turning a darker shade of blue and eventually turning black as the day ends. About a minute after the sky turns black, the two frogs leave the screen—the green frog exits to the left, and the red frog to the right. A firefly then comes on to the screen carrying a "The End" message, which it leaves in the center of the screen. The frog who has captured the most flies at that point is the winner.

There are two different levels that players can select. On the first level, the jumping-off and landing points are fixed; the user needs to time their jumps to catch any flies that may come into the frog's flight path. On the second level, the frogs are free to move about the ground to catch flies, as the jumping and landing points are not fixed. A player can even cause a frog to jump into the water—in that case, the frog will swim back on to the nearest pad. Generally this is to be avoided since it takes several seconds for the frog to swim back to the pad.

== Legacy ==
The game, both in title and gameplay, feature in the 2006 film, Grandma’s Boy.

In 2020, Intellivision Entertainment announced an updated version of the game for the forthcoming Intellivision Amico. As the console has faced numerous delays, this version was never released.
