= Phoenix (Clan of Xymox album) =

Studio album by Xymox
- Released: 1991
- Genres: Alternative rock; new wave; synth-pop
- Length: 46:28
- Label: Wing Records/PolyGram
- Producer: Peter Walsh

Xymox chronology
Twist of Shadows (1989)	Phoenix (1991)	Metamorphosis (1992)

Phoenix is the fourth studio album by Dutch dark wave band Xymox, released in 1991 by Wing Records/PolyGram. It was produced by Peter Walsh. Guitarist Michael Brook guested on the tracks "The Shore Down Under" and "Mark the Days".

The album charted in the United States at No. 163 on the Billboard 200. The single Phoenix of My Heart peaked at No. 16 on Billboard's Hot Dance Club Play chart, as well as reaching No. 16 on the Billboard Modern Rock Tracks chart and No. 27 on the Billboard Hot Dance Music/Maxi-Singles Sales chart.

== Reception ==
The album was perceived as slicker and more pop-minded than Xymox's previous albums. Gavin Report proclaimed the album "a faultless offering of this clan of musicians we call Xymox". Melody Maker said, "They haven't entirely abandoned seamless, panoramic sweeps that characterized their first couple of releases on 4AD, and they still have a firm emotional grip, but now they work in a less gloomy space. Phoenix is full of surprises".

== Track listing ==
Based on:

No.	Title	Writer(s)	Length
1.	"Phoenix of My Heart/Wild Thing outro"	Ronny Moorings, Chip Taylor	4:11
2.	"At the End of the Day"	R. Moorings	3:42
3.	"The Shore Down Under"	Moorings	5:15
4.	"Mark the Days"	Moorings	6:10
5.	"Believe Me Sometimes"	Anka Wolbert	4:54
6.	"Wonderland"	Pieter Nooten	4:57
7.	"Written in the Stars"	Moorings	5:03
8.	"Dancing Barefoot"	Patti Smith, Ivan Kral	3:40
9.	"Crossing the Water"	Nooten	3:46
10.	"Smile Like Heaven"	Wolbert	4:47

== Personnel ==
Xymox

- Ronny Moorings – vocals, lyrics, guitar, keyboards
- Anka Wolbert – vocals, lyrics, keyboards, bass
- Pieter Nooten – vocals, lyrics, keyboards

Additional musicians

- Michael Brook – guitar (3, 4)
- Gavyn Wright – concert master (5)
- Nick Ingman – arranger, string arrangements (5)
- Manny Elias – drums, drum programming
- Greg Walsh – keyboards, programming
- Simon Clark – organ, Hammond organ (4)

Producers, engineers

- Peter Walsh – producer, engineer, mixing (
- Ronny Moorings – producer (2, 9)
- Shaun Cymbalisty – engineer
- Paul Apted – engineer

Graphic design

- Chris Thompson – package design
- Kevin Davies – photography

== Notes ==
Recorded at Jacobs Studios, Surrey. Mixed at Marcus Studios and Ridge Farm Studio.
