= Clan of Xymox (album) =

Studio album by Clan of Xymox
- Released: 1 July 1985
- Recorded: Palladium Studios, Edinburgh
- Genres: Gothic rock; post-punk; dark wave
- Length: 62:02 (with bonus tracks)
- Label: 4AD
- Producers: Clan of Xymox and Ivo Watts-Russell

Clan of Xymox chronology
Subsequent Pleasures (1983)	Clan of Xymox (1985)	Medusa (1986)

Singles from Clan of Xymox
- 1. "A Day" / "Stranger" Released: May 1985

Clan of Xymox is the debut studio album by Dutch dark wave band Clan of Xymox. It was released by 4AD on 1 July 1985.

The album was produced by 4AD co-founder Ivo Watts-Russell and recorded at Palladium Studios in Edinburgh. The remixes included on the album ("A Day" and "Stranger") were mixed and produced by John Fryer at Blackwing Studios in London. Fryer had gained notability for working with seminal bands on the 4AD, Mute, Rough Trade and Beggars Banquet record labels, including Depeche Mode, Fad Gadget and Cocteau Twins.

The album drew comparisons to Joy Division and the Cure, and created a buzz in clubs. Reviewers in subsequent years have derided the album as dated and derivative, but accurately reflecting the emerging goth sound of the time, with "icy, throbbing keyboards; bummed-out vocals; chilly, robotic percussion; gloomy, ethereal guitars; and unusual, cryptic song titles".

In 1985, Melody Maker described it as "a nervous and brilliant record" from "guitar-splayed firefields of 'Cry in the Wind' and 'Stumble and Fall', and thrill(!) to the system clearing, bass bloodied '7th Time'... The range and depth of this mysterious record do not exclude arrogant electro dance anthems like 'Stranger' and 'A Day'; nor do Xymox avoid sentimentality as on 'No Human Can Drown'".

In the same year, Sounds called the album "a strange and wonderful debut from 4AD's first signing since Dead Can Dance. Particular favourite is 'A Day' which suggests so many places, colours feelings and despairs that it is totally awe inspiring".

== Track listing ==
All tracks are written by Ronny Moorings, Pieter Nooten and Anka Wolbert.

No.	Title	Length
1.	"A Day"	6:40
2.	"No Words"	4:26
3.	"Stumble and Fall"	5:05
4.	"Cry in the Wind"	5:16
5.	"Stranger"	7:41
6.	"Equal Ways"	5:44
7.	"7th Time"	4:38
8.	"No Human Can Drown"	3:22

CD reissue bonus tracks
No.	Title	Length
9.	"Muscoviet Musquito"	4:03
10.	"Stranger (Remix)"	5:21
11.	"A Day (Remix)"	9:11
Total length:		62:02

== Personnel ==
Xymox

- Ronny Moorings – vocals, lyrics, guitar, keyboards
- Anka Wolbert – vocals, lyrics, keyboards, bass guitar
- Pieter Nooten – vocals, lyrics, keyboards

Producers, engineers

- Ivo Watts-Russell – producer
- Jon Turner – engineer
- John Fryer – engineer (producer on remixes)
- Keith Mitchell – assistant engineer

Graphic design

- Vaughan Oliver – graphic design
