= Pieter Nooten =

Dutch musician and composer (born 1961)

- Pieter Nooten in 2007

Background information
- Born: 22 January 1961 (age 65); Oss, Netherlands
- Genres: New Wave, Dark wave, electronic, experimental, ambient, film music
- Occupation: Musician
- Instruments: Analog synthesizer, keyboards, MacBook Pro
- Years active: 1980–present
- Labels: 4AD, I-rain, Rocket Girl
- Website: www.pieternooten.com

Pieter Nooten (born 22 January 1961 in Oss) is a Dutch musician and composer best known for his work with Clan of Xymox.

== Music career ==
Nooten's musical career began in the late 1970s. Starting out as the drummer in a local symphonic rock band, he quickly changed to bass guitar and later keyboards, playing in different bands. At the height of house squatting culture and new wave, Nooten met Anka Wolbert and Ronny Moorings who had just formed Clan of Xymox together. During the mid-eighties Clan of Xymox recorded two highly acclaimed albums on 4AD.

In 1987, he teamed up with Michael Brook to record Sleeps with the Fishes, released also on 4AD. This album would become Nooten's most acclaimed work.

In 1989, Clan of Xymox (by then simply "Xymox") signed to Polygram and released their third album, Twist of Shadows. By 1990, in spite of the band's success, he decided to leave Xymox due to growing internal musical differences. While Xymox clearly wanted to stick to their 1980s roots, he started exploring new musical directions. The new, young dance culture intrigued him and a post as in-house producer at the famous One4Two studio's in Amsterdam was readily undertaken.

During the first half of the nineties Nooten produced countless dance 12 inches and ambient orientated music for labels and projects (Hypercycle/First Contact/Ultimate Dream Mix), some of which reached the national record charts.

By 1995, he moved back over to London and renewed the cooperation with Anka, who had also left Xymox. Nooten became somewhat tired with the slowly more and more morose dance music. He signed a publishing deal with Momentum (London). Anka and Pieter signed with EMI (NYC) under the name Vaselyn. However, due to record company internal re-organizations, the Vaselyn project in London was unexpectedly cut short. Anka and Nooten decided to take the material of Vaselyn with them knowing that some day, this material will get released. Shortly afterwards Nooten took an extended sabbatical from the major record industry during which time he wrote music for theatre, commercials and other media occasions.

In 2004, Anka and Pieter started producing Sophie Zeyl's debut album Two Ways of Running. After recordings were finished in 2005, he started producing and remixing the material for Ourspace. They both also released Anka's solo album Cocoon Time on I-rain Records.

In 2008, Nooten re-entered the music industry and started writing and composing again. He sang on Stoa's album Silmand and released a compilation on the Twilight label.

In 2010, Nooten signed with Rocket Girl in the UK, releasing the 12 track CD called Here Is Why which showed his skill as a producer for other artists. Surround Us was produced completely using a MacBook Pro and Midi keyboard; no other instruments were used except for Lucas Stam’s improvisational cello, which adds texture to the tracks it is featured on.

In 2013, Nooten released the double CD Haven again on Rocket Girl. He also performed during the 2014 World Press Photos awards and wrote a highly acclaimed Bach transcription for the NY based Red Hot organization. Tired of the restrictions of writing and releasing music only, Nooten set up La Compania Parpadeo with dancer and choreographer Miryam Chachmany in 2014, crossing borders between traditional flamenco music, electronic and neo-classical music, poetry, visual art and dance. Also in 2014, Nooten teamed up with long time friend Bert Barten and Real World producer/engineer/composer Stephen W Tayler, collaborating on an avant garde music project.

In August 2017, Nooten announced a pledge music campaign to fund his next album, which was eventually released in November 2018 under the name 'Stem".

== Discography ==
=== With Clan of Xymox ===
Albums:

- Clan of Xymox (4AD, 1985)
- Medusa (4AD, 1986)
- Twist of Shadows (Wing Records, 1989)
- Phoenix (Wing Records, 1991)

=== With Michael Brook ===
Albums:

- Sleeps with the Fishes (4AD, 1987)

=== With First Contact ===
Singles/EPs:

- "I Call Upon" (Hypercycle/Virgin, 1992)
- "Proze & Cons" (Hypercycle/Virgin, 1993)
- "Into the Light" (Hypercycle/Virgin, 1993)
- "Gotta Get Back (2 Love)" (Hypercycle/Virgin, 1993)

=== With Fingerprince ===
Singles/EPs:

- Trancelucent (Hypercycle, 1993)

== Solo discography ==
=== as Cyberia ===
Singles/EPs:

- "Hanggliding" (Hypercycle/Virgin, 1992)
- "Albatross" (Hypercycle/Virgin, 1992)
- "Open Up" (Hypercycle/Virgin, 1993)
- "What Kids Do on a Rainy Day" (Third Mind Records, 1995)

=== as Pieter Nooten ===
Albums:

- Ourspace (I-Rain, 2006)
- Collected (Twilight Records, 2008)
- Here Is Why (Rocket Girl, 2010)
- Surround Us (Rocket Girl, 2012)
- Haven (Rocket Girl, 2013)
- Stem (Rocket Girl, 2018)
- Se Dire Au Revoir (Rocket Girl, 2019)
- Someone There (Rocket Girl, 2023)
- Sorrowful Music For The Downhearted (self released, 2025)
