= Anka Wolbert =

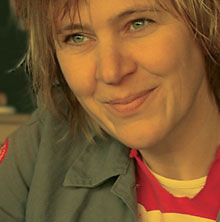
- Anka Wolbert in 2006

Background information
- Born: Anke Wolbert; 10 June 1963 (age 63); Netherlands
- Genres: Electronic, new wave, darkwave, synth-pop
- Occupations: Songwriter, musician, singer, co-producer
- Instruments: Vocals, guitar, bass guitar, keyboards, programming
- Years active: 1981–present
- Labels: 4AD, Polygram, Anxious, EMI, I-Rain Records
- Formerly of: Clan of Xymox
- Website: www.facebook.com/anka.wolbert

Anka Wolbert (also Anke Wolbert, born 10 June 1963) is a Dutch musician, singer, songwriter and artist, best known for her work with Clan of Xymox.

== Music career ==
=== Xymox, Clan of Xymox ===
Anka Wolbert co-founded the band Xymox with Ronny Moorings in 1981, self-publishing their first mini-album Subsequent Pleasures in 1983. Pieter Nooten joined the band as third songwriter shortly after this release.

With the name Xymox lengthened to Clan of Xymox, they signed a recording contract with independent UK label 4AD and released their eponymous debut album Clan of Xymox in 1985. The track 7th Time, with Anka Wolbert on lead vocals, was picked up by John Peel, leading to the band recording twice at the Peel Sessions at the BBC, in June and November 1985. Peel referred to the band's dark and melancholic sound as darkwave.

In 1986, Clan of Xymox released their second album Medusa on 4AD. The album was described by Sounds as "an overriding achievement … every track sounds like the finale to a brooding epic overture", with the track Masquerade (written and sung by Wolbert) described as "an elegant ballad with her bass high in the mix and scored with strings". Wolbert and Moorings moved to London and the band toured the United States and Europe. As their US success grew, Clan of Xymox left 4AD and signed to New York-based label PolyGram.

Abbreviated to Xymox again, the band's third album Twist of Shadows was released on PolyGram in 1989. In the United States, this album created a cult following for the band with much support from college radio stations and sold out venues on live tours. Two singles taken from the Twist of Shadows album, Blind Hearts and Obsession, reached the US Billboard charts. The album's third single Imagination, written and sung by Anka Wolbert, brought the band the most mainstream attention, charting at No. 85 on Billboard Hot 100, generating Top 40 radio airplay and MTV rotation of the Imagination video. Shortly after the release of their fourth album Phoenix on PolyGram in 1991, Wolbert moved from London to NYC, home to Polygram's headquarters.

Wolbert left Xymox in 1992.

=== Solo and collaborative career ===
In 1993, Wolbert collaborated with Toni Halliday (from the band Curve) on a new album under the band name of Bud. Wolbert was signed by Dave Stewart of Eurythmics to the publishing side of his label, Anxious Records. While the Bud album didn't see a release, material written for this album was taken to a new band started by Wolbert called Vaselyn in 1994.

Wolbert returned to 4AD signing a development deal with the label in 1994. Pieter Nooten joined Vaselyn as co-writer and musician in 1995. In 1996, Vaselyn signed a worldwide deal to a subsidiary of EMI Music, The Enclave, in NYC. In 1997, EMI folded the label into Virgin Records which left many artists in limbo, Vaselyn one of them, and Wolbert decided to take a break from the music industry.

Wolbert recorded and released her first solo album Cocoon Time, co-produced by Pieter Nooten, on I-Rain Records in 2006. Slug Magazine reviewed the album as exotic, atmospheric pop with an edge and "a triumphant return". Textura Magazine wrote that the album "impresses as a splendid and oft-intoxicating collection of classic songwriting, romantic mood-sculpting, and earthy vocalizing." Dutch music magazine OOR classified the album as "sincere pop" and "full of strong melodies, striking textual depth full of sincerity about love, rock & roll life, sex, addictions and being on the run". Chain D.L.K. called it "a hypnotic masterpiece. Anka's songwriting skills have proven to be the best even since the Xymox-era of what she had to display."

In the same year, Wolbert co-produced Nooten's solo album Ourspace on I-Rain Records. Wolbert and Nooten also co-produced Sophie Zeyl's album Running Two Ways on I-Rain Records in 2006.

Anka Wolbert lives and works in Margate as a cross-disciplinary artist.

== Discography ==
=== With Clan of Xymox ===
Studio albums

- Clan of Xymox (4AD, 1985)
- Medusa (4AD, 1986)
- Twist of Shadows (Wing Records/Polydor, 1989)
- Phoenix (Wing Records/PolydorNYC, 1991)

Singles/EPs

- Subsequent Pleasures (vinyl 12", self-released, 1983; re-released Dark Entries Records, 2014)
- "A Day" (12", 4AD, 1986)
- "A Day/Stranger" (12", 4AD, 1985)
- "Louise" (7", Megadisc, 1986)
- "Muscoviet Musquito" (promotional 7", Virgin France 1986)
- "Blind Hearts" (12", 4AD/Rough Trade, 1987)
- "Blind Hearts" (12", PolyGram, 1989)
- "Obsession" (12", PolyGram, 1989)
- "Imagination" (12" and CD-single, PolyGram, 1989)
- "Phoenix" (CD and LP, Wing/Polydor, 1991)
- "Phoenix of My Heart" (Maxi CD and 12", Wing/Polydor, 1991)
- "At the End of the Day" (Maxi CD and 12", Wing/Polydor, 1991)

=== As Anka Wolbert ===
Studio album

- Cocoon Time (I-Rain, 2006)
