= Clan of Xymox =

Dutch rock band

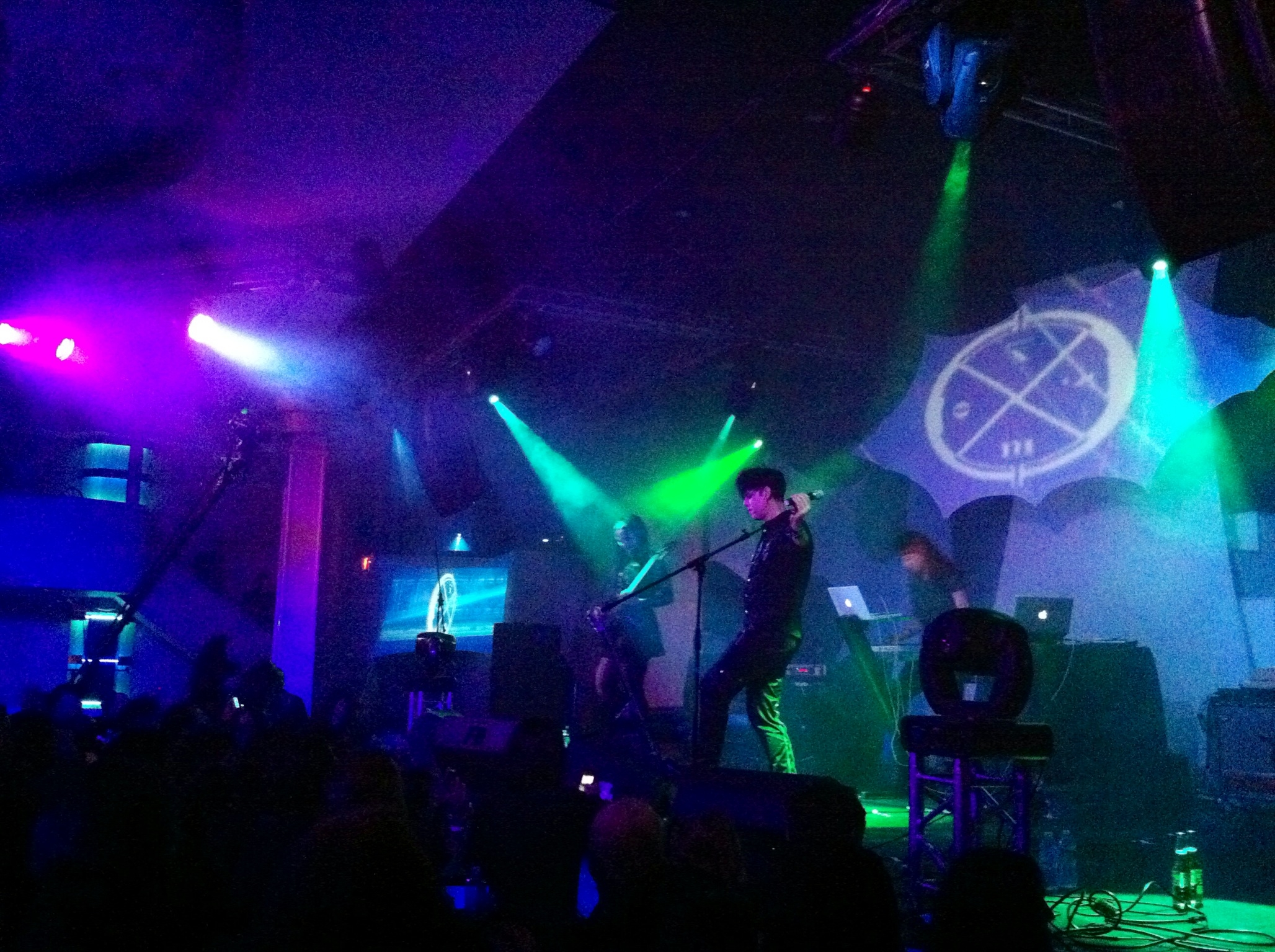
- Clan of Xymox live at Triton Music Festival New York City, 2010

Background information
- Also known as: Xymox
- Origin: Nijmegen, Netherlands
- Genres: Electronic rock; gothic rock; dark wave; new wave; industrial
- Years active: 1981–present
- Labels: Metropolis Records, Wing Records, PolyGram, 4AD
- Members: Ronny Moorings; Mojca Zugna; Mario Usai; Sean de Winzer; Katharina von Schlotterstein
- Past members: Pieter Nooten; Anka Wolbert; Frank Weyzig; Willem van Antwerpen; Tom Ashton; Sharon Soffner; Rob Vonk; Nina Simic; Rui Ramos; Lilah (Katalin Clarke); Paul Whittlesea; Denise Dijkstra; Agnes Jasper; Yvonne de Ray; Daniel Hoffmann; Kristen Nevermore
- Website: clanofxymox.com

Clan of Xymox, also known as simply Xymox, are a Dutch rock band formed in 1983 best known as pioneers of dark wave music. Clan of Xymox featured a trio of singer-songwriters – Ronny Moorings, Anka Wolbert, and Pieter Nooten – and gained success in the 1980s, releasing their first two albums on 4AD, before releasing their third and fourth albums on Wing Records and scoring a hit single with their song Imagination in the United States.

== History ==
=== 4AD and the Peel Sessions (1983–1988) ===
Clan of Xymox were formed in Nijmegen, Netherlands, in 1983 by Ronny Moorings (guitars, vocals) and Anka Wolbert (bass, vocals). The name Xymox is a variation of zymotic (from the Greek zymosis), a term from old medicine, which has a striking, barbed wire-like appearance when written in capital letters. Wolbert stated of the band's formation:

Ronny and I met as students in Nijmegen and we connected over our taste in music. We started making music together and picked up some equipment to experiment with, like the Korg MS-10 and a rhythm machine...We started to perform live, just the two of us, changing instruments in between songs. While I had a bass guitar strapped around my neck and simultaneously hit the monophonic keyboard, Ronny played guitar and sang. We combined our sound with tape loops, a Casio, plus a few weird instruments.

About a year later, Moorings and Wolbert moved to Amsterdam, where they joined Pieter Nooten (Moorings' Nijmegen flat-mate) and Frank Weyzig, who added their own contributions. Assuming the name "Xymox" after the word zymotic (of or causing fermentation), in 1983 the group released a five-track EP titled Subsequent Pleasures, limited to 500 copies.

The band was invited by Brendan Perry to support Dead Can Dance on a UK tour and were signed to the indie label 4AD, which released their eponymous debut album in 1985. The track 7th Time, with Anka Wolbert on lead vocals, was picked up by John Peel, leading to the band recording two of the Peel Sessions at the BBC, in June and November 1985.

In 1986, they released their second and last album on 4AD, Medusa, before signing with PolyGram. Simultaneously, Pieter Nooten recorded and released his album Sleeps with the Fishes (4AD, 1987), in collaboration with Canadian session musician Michael Brook. In a 2010 interview with AlterNation Magazine, Moorings expressed disappointment at the divided interests of the band members at this stage, exclaiming Medusa's follow-up album was "made entirely independently, without the rest of the musicians, who were then on vacation."

=== PolyGram and international success (1988–1991) ===
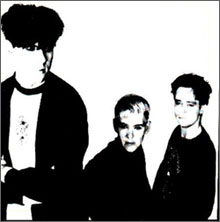
Ronny Moorings, Anka Wolbert and Pieter Nooten, 1991

Now abbreviated as Xymox, the band's third album, Twist of Shadows, was released in 1989. This album, and its successor Phoenix, were released by Wing Records, a subsidiary of Polydor Records/PolyGram. In the United States, these two albums created a cult following for the band. The first two singles taken from the Twist of Shadows album, "Blind Hearts" and "Obsession", proved college and club hits in the United States, with "Obsession" charting on Billboard's Alternative Songs chart and both tracks hitting the Billboard Club Play Chart.

It was the album's third single, "Imagination" (with Anka Wolbert on lead vocals), that brought the band the most mainstream attention, charting at No. 85 on Billboard Hot 100, generating Top 40 radio airplay and MTV rotation of the "Imagination (Edit)" single video. Twist of Shadows proved their most commercially successful album, selling more than 300,000 copies worldwide.

By this time the band had moved to England and released their fourth album, Phoenix, on PolyGram in 1991; after this album, Anka Wolbert and Pieter Nooten left the band due to disagreements about the band's musical direction.

=== Independent career (1991–present) ===
Ronny Moorings of Clan of Xymox in concert in 2008, in Orlando, Florida

Xymox worked with Japanese singer Atsushi Sakurai to create the song "Yokan" (予感) for the March 1992 compilation album Dance 2 Noise 002. Without Nooten and Wolbert, the group left PolyGram to release the UK acid house inspired LPs Metamorphosis (1992) and Headclouds (1993) independently. These albums marked a break from the dark wave sound of the 1980s and met with poor record sales in the United States, which had moved towards a markedly different grunge sound at the time. Ronny Moorings toured under the banner of Xymox until 1994 with an evolving cast of live musicians, including girlfriend and future band member Mojca Zugna. Frank Weyzig (the last of the original line-up) parted ways with Moorings after the 1994 tour, after which Moorings moved back to the Netherlands and took a three-year hiatus from music-writing.

Capitalizing on a resurgence in the popularity of gothic rock and the success of bands such as Nine Inch Nails and Rammstein, 1997 saw Moorings reverting the name to Clan of Xymox and moving to Germany – then the center of the burgeoning industrial music scene – to resume songwriting. Moorings recruited new live members and signed with the independent US label Tess Records in 1997 then with Metropolis in 1998. The LPs Hidden Faces (1997), Creatures (1999) and Notes from the Underground (2001) reflect an increasingly electro sound while maintaining the distinctive dance rhythms associated with the Clan of Xymox catalog. In 1998, 4AD re-released Clan of Xymox and Medusa in the US, and Xymox toured the United States the following year. 2003's FareWell featured several charting tracks internationally. Breaking Point followed in 2006 on Metropolis Records. In 2009, the band released In Love We Trust on Trisol Music Group, which marked a return to the layered sound of their earlier 4AD years. Darkest Hour (2011) took a more industrial direction, while Kindred Spirits (2012) was a covers album featuring reinterpretations of songs by The Cure, Depeche Mode, Joy Division, David Bowie, and others. The LP Matters of Mind, Body and Soul was released in February 2014 on Trisol, Metropolis, and Gravitator for European, American, and Russian distribution, respectively.

In addition to intermittent original releases, Clan of Xymox has contributed to a number of compilations and side projects since conception. In 1987, the track "Moscoviet Mosquito" was re-recorded and released on the 4AD compilation album Lonely Is an Eyesore. In October 2000 the band released Live, a double CD with nineteen tracks and two videos featuring live performances of Xymox songs from the 4AD, Polygram, and independent eras. In September 2004, a Best of Clan of Xymox album was released with re-recorded versions of early hits as well as later offerings. In 2011, the track "In Your Arms Again" from the LP Darkest Hour was included on the soundtrack to David Fincher's The Girl with the Dragon Tattoo. In 2012 the band released a cover album, Kindred Spirits, featuring covers of several influential post-punk and new wave groups in Mooring's own musical styling. The songs "A Day", "Masquerade", and "Cry in the Wind" were featured on the official soundtrack to the 2014 film The Guest.

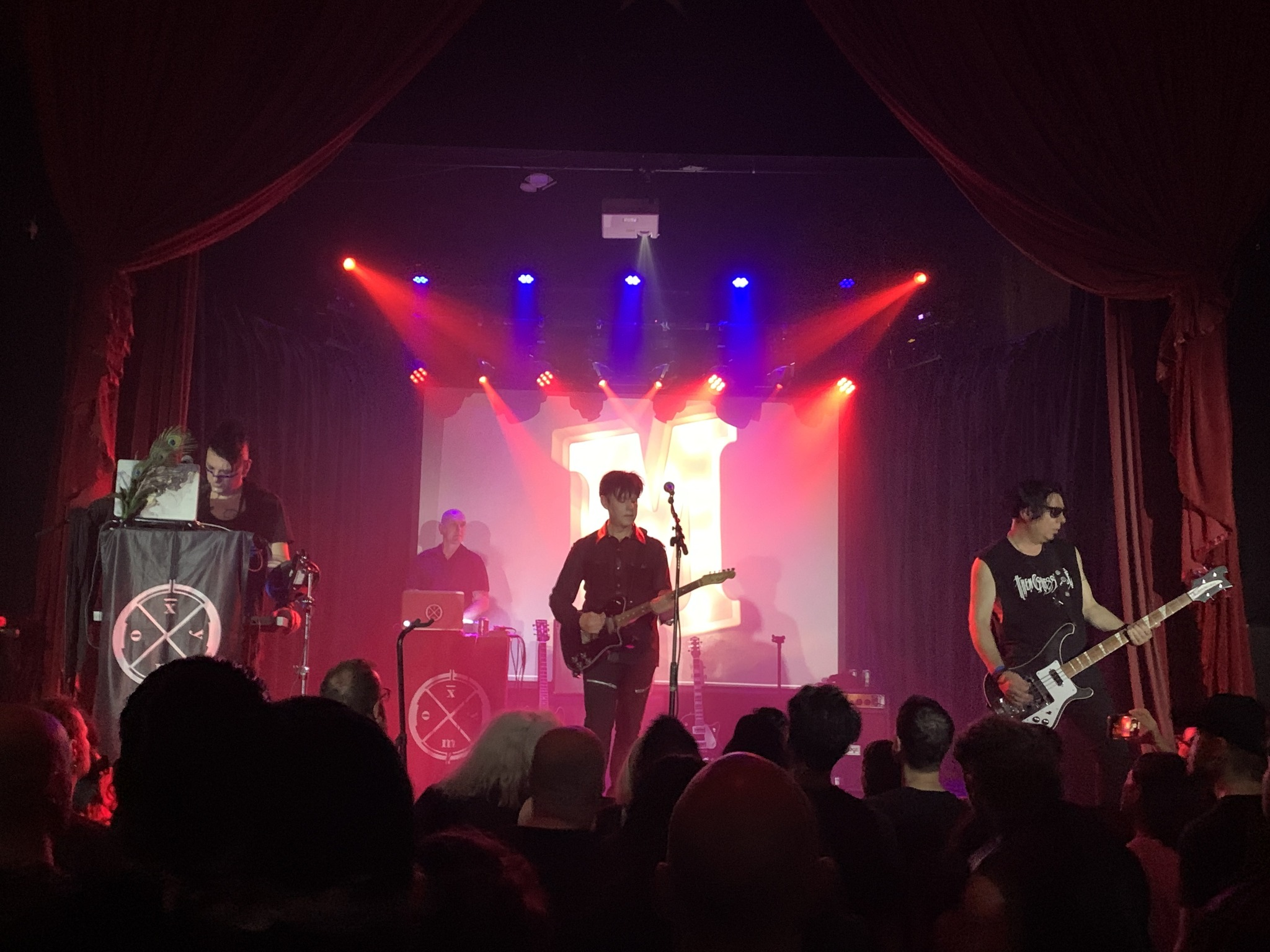
Clan of Xymox plays at Portland's Star Theater on June 11, 2023.

In 2021, the band released Limbo, a concept album about the COVID-19 pandemic. Alice Teeple of Post-Punk.com praised the album, calling it "a masterstroke of modern goth rock." Teeple opined that the album proves that the band "remains at the top of their songwriting game".

In June 2024, the band released the album Exodus, followed six months later by the EP Blood of Christ. In September 2026, Clan of Xymox released the double A-side single "Broken Heart" / "Fire" through Metropolis Records in the Americas and Trisol in Europe, their first new music since Exodus. Moorings described "Broken Heart" as capturing "the tension between losing someone and still being consumed by them"; "Fire" had already been performed live before its release.

== Musical style ==
Clan of Xymox's music draws on darkwave, gothic rock, synth-pop, and post-punk, characterised by atmospheric synthesiser layers, driving rhythms, and introspective lyrics. AllMusic describes them as "known for their driving, often danceable form of introspective goth rock". Moorings has stated that "the blueprint of Clan of Xymox is to combine electronics with live instruments, so it gives wide possibilities to use and mix these into songs."

Their sound has evolved over the decades. The early 4AD records featured post-punk atmospherics and layered synthesiser textures, while the PolyGram era saw a shift toward more commercial synth-pop and alternative dance. After moving to Berlin in the late 1990s, Moorings incorporated heavier guitars and deeper vocals, drawing on the popularity of industrial rock. Later releases such as In Love We Trust (2009) marked a return to the layered sound of their earlier 4AD years.

== Legacy ==
Clan of Xymox are widely regarded as one of the pioneering acts of the darkwave genre. AllMusic's Michael Sutton describes them as "a major influence on the darkwave scene," noting their importance as a staple of the 4AD label in the 1980s. Columbus Alive placed them among "the second generation of 4AD influencers after Bauhaus, Cocteau Twins or Dead Can Dance." BBC DJ John Peel, who championed the band early in their career, is credited with first applying the term "darkwave" to their music.

The band's 1989 album Twist of Shadows was their most commercially successful release, selling 300,000 copies. Despite limited mainstream exposure, the band has maintained a consistent presence in the gothic rock and darkwave scenes for over four decades, continuing to release new material and tour internationally.

== Discography ==
=== Studio albums ===
- Clan of Xymox (1985)
- Medusa (1986)
- Twist of Shadows (1989) – under Xymox
- Phoenix (1991) – under Xymox (last with original line-up)
- Metamorphosis (1992) – under Xymox
- Headclouds (1993) – under Xymox
- Hidden Faces (1997)
- Creatures (1999)
- Notes from the Underground, (2001)
- Farewell (2003)
- Breaking Point (2006)
- In Love We Trust, (2009)
- Darkest Hour (2011)
- Matters of Mind, Body & Soul (2014)
- Days of Black (2017)
- Spider on the Wall (2020)
- Limbo (2021)
- Exodus (2024)

=== Cover album ===
- Kindred Spirits, (2012)

=== Singles/EPs ===
- Subsequent Pleasures (vinyl 12", self-released, 1983) – under Xymox
- "A Day" (12", 4AD, 1986; re-released, Old Gold, 1998)
- "A Day/Stranger" (12", Contempo, 1985)
- "Louise" (7", Megadisc, 1986)
- "Muscoviet Musquito" (promotional 7", Virgin France 1986)
- "Blind Hearts" (12", 4AD/Rough Trade, 1987)
- "Blind Hearts" (12", Wing, 1989; different songs than from the 4AD release)
- "Obsession" (12", Wing/PolyGram, 1989)
- "Imagination" (12" and CD-single, Wing, 1989)
- "Phoenix" (CS and LP, Polydor, 1991)
- "Phoenix of My Heart" (Maxi CD and 12", Wing/Polydor, 1991)
- "At the End of the Day" (Maxi CD and 12", Wing, 1991)
- "Out of the Rain" (Maxi CD, Tess, 1997)
- "This World" (Maxi CD, Tess, 1998)
- "Consolation" (Maxi CD, Metropolis, 1999)
- "Liberty" (Maxi CD, Metropolis/Pandaimonium, 2000)
- The John Peel Sessions (CD EP, Strange Fruit, 2001; re-released, Celebration, 2003)
- "There's No Tomorrow" (Maxi CD, Pandaimonium, 2002)
- "Weak in My Knees" (Maxi CD, Pandaimonium, 2006)'
- "Heroes" (Pandaimonium, 2007)
- "Emily" (Maxi CD, Trisol, 2009)
- "She" (Metropolis, 2020)
- "Lovers" (Metropolis, 2020)
- "All I Ever Know" (Metropolis, 2020)
- "X-Odus" (Metropolis, 2024)
- "Blood of Christ" (Metropolis, 2024)
- "Broken Heart" / "Fire" (Metropolis/Trisol, 2026)

=== Remixes ===
- "Dream On/XDD" (12", X-ULT, 1992)
- "Reaching Out" (Maxi CD and 12", Zok, 1993)
- "Spiritual High (Club Mix)" (promotional 12", Zok, 1993)
- "Remix" – (CD, Zok, 1994)

=== Live albums ===
- Live (2000)
- Live at Castle Party (2011)

=== Compilations ===
- Remixes from the Underground (2002)
- The Best of Clan of Xymox (2004)
- Visible (2008)

=== Remixes of other artists ===
- The Crüxshadows – “Never Surrender/Citadel” (2004)
- I:Scintilla – “Scin", on Optics (2007)
- She Past Away – “Sanrı” (2020)
- A Cloud of Ravens – “World on Fire” (2021)
- Delerium – “In the Deep” (2024)
