= Twist of Shadows =

Studio album by Xymox
- Released: 10 April 1989
- Genres: Alternative rock; new wave; synth-pop; electronic pop; gothic rock; electronic dance music
- Length: 46:28
- Label: Polygram
- Producers: Greg Walsh, Peter Walsh

Xymox chronology
| Medusa (1986) | Twist of Shadows (1989) | Phoenix (1991) |

Twist of Shadows is Xymox's third full-length album, released in 1989 on Wing Records (PolyGram) and produced by Peter Walsh.

The album captured Billboard's "Hot Shot Debut" honor and charted in the United States at #165 on the Billboard 200. Twist of Shadows launched several charting singles in the United States. In March 1989, "Obsession" shot up to #16 on Billboard's Modern Rock Tracks chart. By June 1989 it had also reached #12 on Billboard's Hot Dance Club Songs (also known as Club Play Singles, and formerly known as Hot Dance Club Play). The second single, "Blind Hearts", reached #9 on the Dance Music/Club Play chart. The third single taken from the album, "Imagination" (with Anka Wolbert on lead vocals) reached #85 on Billboard Hot 100 and remains Xymox's biggest commercial success to date.

== Background ==
Contrary to official songwriting credits (see Track listing below), lead singer and frontman Ronny Moorings told french fanzine Premonition in a 2003 interview that he allegedly "always wrote the music and the words [him]self since the beginning of Clan Of Xymox in 1984". Pieter Nooten, who last contributed to Xymox with the next album, said differently in 2010 that the members of the band had from the start collaborated in songwriting, with Moorings contributing guitar, keyboards and lyrics; Nooten specifically claimed credit for composing Twist's "Clementina" although it is credited to Moorings. Furthermore, the song bears striking resemblance to one of Nooten's other pieces, specifically a B-side "Promises" also released from this album. Also in 2010, Bert Barten claimed to have shared authorship for songs on Twist of Shadows, asserting "It was always a big grey area who wrote what and who inspired who. All the members even the manager at that time used to fight a lot about things like this." Anka Wolbert reflected in an interview in 2005: "The 'old' Xymox was always a combination and working together of three individuals: Ronny, Pieter Nooten, and myself. To me, Xymox was never one of them by themselves, and I consistently believed in the strength of the artistic combination of us three. There was a magical energy between us which resulted in some great music."

The album was recorded at Cobwebs Studio, Jacobs Studio and Ridge Farm Studio, and mixed at Comforts Place. The string section was recorded at Tony Visconti's Good Earth Studios, now Dean Street Studios.

== Reception ==
According to Spin, Twist of Shadows signified the most sophisticated stage in the band's gradual evolution from arty obscurity into pop accessibility. Billboard claimed the album, along with the followup Phoenix (1991), had lifted the band to cult status in the United States. The album had mixed reviews. While Spin praised the album and called it "still ethereal, big and foreboding", Trouser Press found the album "easily endurable" but labeled the band "just another lightweight electronic dance band of the post-romantic era". "Although Twist of Shadows wasn't exactly considered industrial in its sound," writes AllMusic's James Chrispell, "the bpm's run mid-tempo and sound made it totally danceable in a New Order-ish way. The Great Indie Discography found the album "decidedly dated...stuck in a mid-80s groove", while the St. Petersburg Times looked back at Twist of Shadows as "brilliant...[w]ith a dense, almost Gothic sound that borrowed as heavily from Pink Floyd as it did modern techno-popsters".

In 2026, Uncut ranked Twist of Shadows at number 149 in their list of "The 200 Greatest Goth Albums", believing that despite losing their "strongest melodicist" in Pieter Nooten, Xymox compensated with their new focus on electronic pop, further noting that the songs became "college-radio standards" in the United States and helped the band break the American market.

== Track listing ==
| No. | Title | Writer(s) | Length |
|---|---|---|---|
| 1. | "Evelyn" | R. Moorings, A. Wolbert | 4:02 |
| 2. | "Obsession" | R. Moorings, A. Wolbert | 5:49 |
| 3. | "Craving" | R. Moorings, A. Wolbert | 5:41 |
| 4. | "Blind Hearts" | R. Moorings, A. Wolbert, B. Barten | 3:47 |
| 5. | "The River" | R. Moorings, A. Wolbert | 2:49 |
| 6. | "A Million Things" | R. Moorings, A. Wolbert, B. Barten | 3:52 |
| 7. | "Tonight" | R. Moorings, A. Wolbert | 5:19 |
| 8. | "Imagination" | R. Moorings, A. Wolbert | 5:04 |
| 9. | "In a City" (titled "In the City" on many releases) | R. Moorings | 4:56 |
| 10. | "Clementina" | P. Nooten | 5:09 |

== Personnel ==
Xymox

- Ronny Moorings – Vocals, Lyrics, Guitar, Keyboards
- Anka Wolbert – Vocals, Lyrics, Keyboards, Bass
- Pieter Nooten – Keyboards

Additional musicians

- Will Anvers – Drums
- Tony Visconti – Arranger, String arrangements (Track 07 and 10)
- Arditti Quartet – Strings (Track 07 and 10)
- Elisa Richard – Vocals (Background, Track 04)

Producers, Engineers

- Peter Walsh – Producer, Engineer, Mixing, Vocals (Background)
- Greg Walsh – Additional Production
- Martyn Heyes – Assistant Engineer
- Donal Hodgson – Assistant Engineer

Graphic Design

- Vaughan Oliver – Graphic Design
- Richard McMillan – Photomicrography
