= List of Pakistani qawwali singers =

This article contains the list of past and present Qawwali singers that are based in Pakistan & India. Following are the most popular Pakistani Qawwali singers of all times.

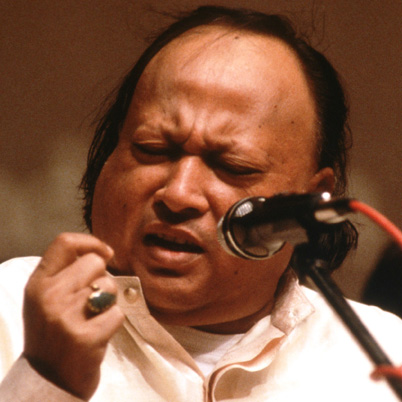
Nusrat Fateh Ali Khan

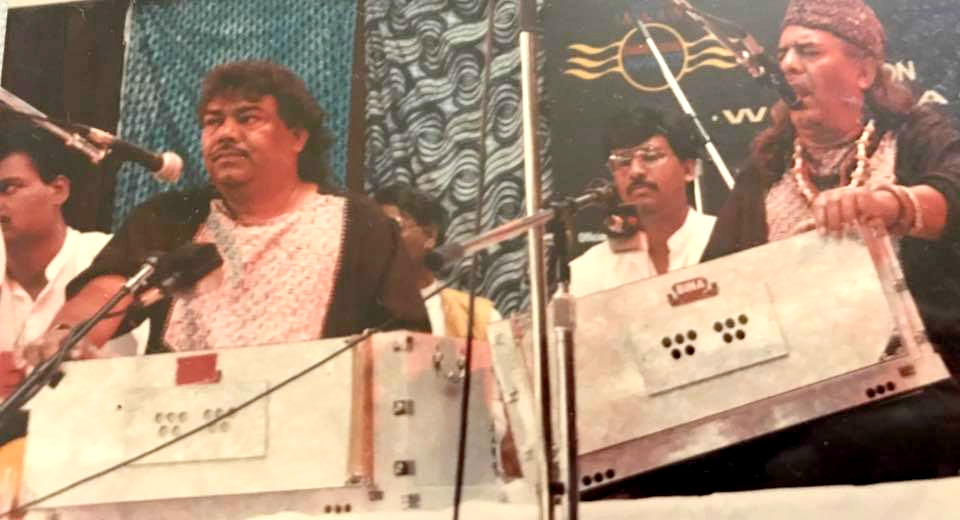
Sabri Brothers

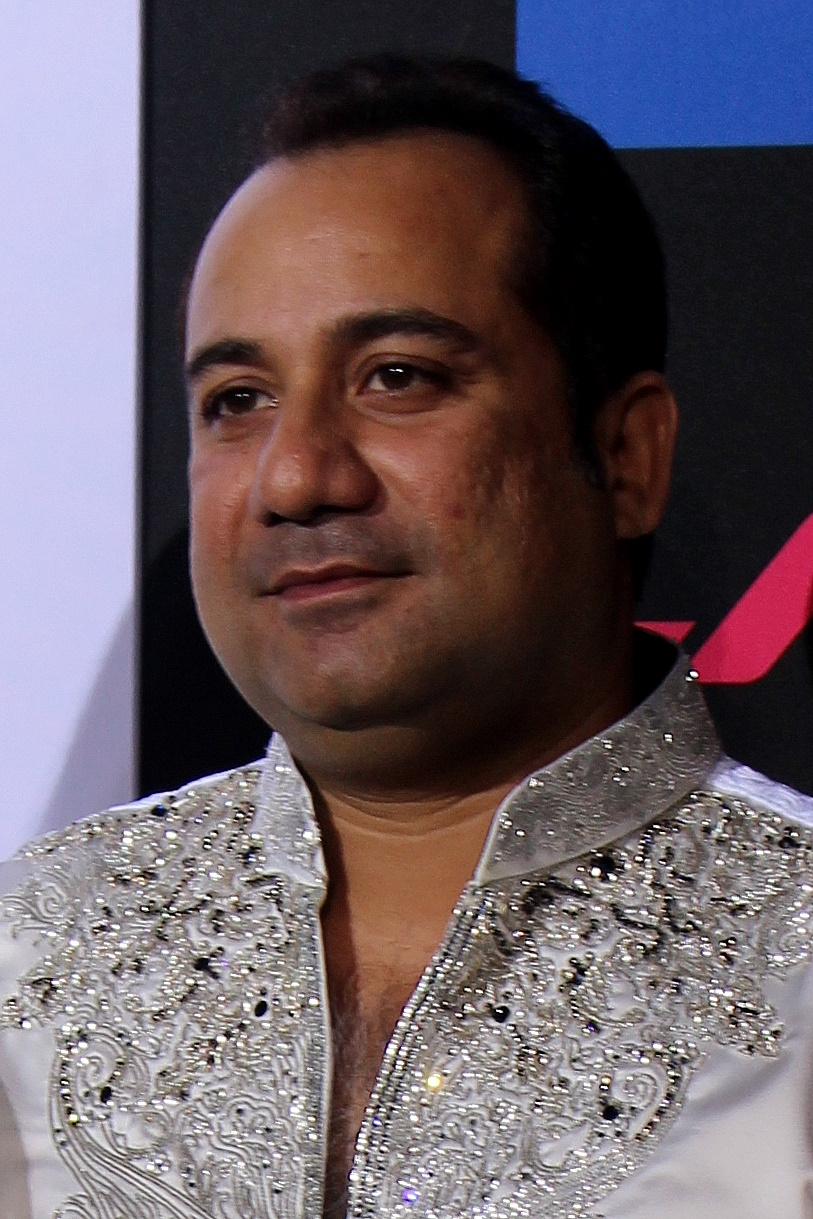
Rahat Fateh Ali Khan

== A ==
- Abida Parveen
- Abu Muhammad Qawwal
- Abdullah Niazi Qawwal
- Amjad Sabri
- Aziz Mian

== B ==
- Badar Ali Khan also known as Badar Miandad Qawwal

== F ==
- Farrukh Fateh Ali Khan
- Fateh Ali Khan
- Fareed Ayaz
- Faiz Ali Faiz

== J ==
- Javed Bashir

== M ==
- Munshi Raziuddin
- Manzoor Ahmed Khan

== N ==
- Nusrat Fateh Ali Khan

== Q ==
- Qawwal Bahauddin Khan

== R ==
- Rahat Fateh Ali Khan
- Rizwan-Muazzam Qawwali Group

== S ==
- Sabri Brothers
- Sher Miandad

== See also ==
- Music of Pakistan
- List of Pakistanis
- Music of South Asia
- Culture of Pakistan
