= Gharana =

Hindustani classical music

In Hindustani music (North Indian classical music), a gharānā is a system of social organisation in the Indian subcontinent, linking musicians or dancers by lineage or apprenticeship, and more importantly by adherence to a particular musical style.

The word gharana comes from the Hindi word 'ghar' which means 'house'. It typically refers to the place where the musical ideology originated; for example, some of the gharanas well known for singing khyals are: Gwalior, Delhi, Agra, Indore, Kashmiri, Atrauli-Jaipur, Kirana and Patiala. Four famous kathak gharanas are: Lucknow, Atrauli-Jaipur, Benares and Raigarh.

== Background ==
Kadambari playing sitar by Raja Raja Varma

Gharana is a lineage which is biological (often patrilineal, father-son, etc.) initially and grows into a disciple chain (referred to by some traditions as "silsila". The chain of disciples and their disciples spreads over generations and is referred to as guru-shishya parampara. The concept is based on the prevalence of performance arts being family traditions in South Asia. Nowadays, the term connotes what Ashok Ranade describes as the "comprehensive musico-aesthetic ideology changing from gharana to gharana."

=== Etymology ===
Scholars claim the term gharana" comes from the Hindustani word "ghara," rooted from the Sanskrit word "griha," meaning family, dynasty, or home.

The association of locations with gharanas serve two purposes. Primarily, gharanas' locations were understood to indicate the place of origin of heredity performing musicians. For example, Kirana being the birthplace of Bande Ali Khan and, by extension, his gharana. Secondarily, gharanas' locations were understood to indicate the location of the performing musician's patron. For example, Rampur being the court in which Inayat Hussain Khan served and made a name for himself.

=== History ===
The gharana system was rooted in the guru–shishya tradition. Most of the surviving gharanas were initially based in Delhi until the divestment from the arts by Aurangzeb during the second half of the 17th Century. Performing musicians and their families immigrated from Delhi to other nearby courts seeking patronage. As a result, these musicians came to be associated with princely states such as Gwalior, Lucknow, Hyderabad, Patiala, and Rampur.

== Prominent gharanas ==
=== Vocal traditions ===
==== Khyal gharanas ====
The gharanas have distinct styles of presenting the khyal — how much to emphasize and how to enunciate the words of the composition, when to sing the sthayi and antara, whether to sing an unmetered alap in the beginning, what kinds of improvisations to use, how much importance to give to the rhythmic aspect, and so on. However, an individual performer from a gharana may choose to borrow appealing stylistic aspects of another gharana in his or her gayaki (singing style). There are ten prominent khyal gharanas, and they are:

Gharana	Founding Artists	Approximate founding date	Famous Exponents	Features
Qawwal Bacchon ka Gharana	Hazrat Amir Khusrau and his 12 disciples	13th Century	Precursor of Mewati gharana, Lucknow gharana, Dilli Gharana, and Patiala gharana	Oldest Khayal gharana. Embraces wide range of taans, bol baant, bol taan, fast taan pattern, gamak taan, emphasis on melody and laykari, structured badhat of raga. Members of this gharana approach raagdari with more freedom than the dhrupad-informed gharanas, like Gwalior, Jaipur, and Agra. Emphasis on bhav and exposition are the hallmarks of this style.In addition to extensive khayal compositions, the gharana is known for its qawwals.
Lucknow gharana	Miyan Samti	17th Century	Bade Mohammed Khan, Bade Mubarak Ali Khan, Shori Miyan, Miyan Achpal, Yusuf Ali Khan.	Precursor of Gwalior gharana.
Dilli gharana	Tanras Khan	19th Century	Chand Khan, Nasir Ahmed Khan, Munshi Raziuddin, Naseeruddin Saami, Iqbal Ahmed Khan, Fareed Ayaz, Abu Muhammad	Stream of Qawwal Bacchon ka Gharana.
Gwalior gharana	Nathan Pir Baksh, Hassu Khan, Haddu Khan, Nathu Khan	Mid 16th Century	Vishnu Digambar Paluskar, Omkarnath Thakur, D. V. Paluskar, Kumar Gandharva, Malini Rajurkar, Veena Sahasrabuddhe, N. Rajam, Meeta Pandit, Venkatesh Kumar	The most noticeable trait of this gharana is strong emphasis on gamaks in taans, as well as use of Bol-baant, bol-taan, no use of sargam, wide range in taans, alankarik taans, descending sapaat taans, roughly similar emphasis on melody and rhythm, preference for simple (as opposed to compound) ragas, repertoire of bandishes, variety of taans.
Agra gharana	Ghagge Khuda Baksh	Mid-19th century	Faiyaz Khan, Vilayat Hussain Khan, Sharafat Hussain Khan, C. R. Vyas, Lalith J. Rao, Waseem Ahmed Khan	Closer to dhrupad with nom-tom type alap and other elements, rhythmic play, frequent use of tisra jati in teentaal, emphasis on voice culture to achieve wide range and powerful throw of voice, bol-baant, bol-taan, rare use of sargam, slower taans, use of jabda taan, repertoire of traditional and self-composed bandishes.
Kirana gharana	Bande Ali Khan, Abdul Karim Khan, Abdul Wahid Khan	Late-19th century	Sawai Gandharva, Hirabai Barodekar, Bhimsen Joshi, Gangubai Hangal, Prabha Atre, Anand Bhate	Kirana is often considered to be the flag-bearer of Hindustani Classical vocal music. Foremost intention of this gharana is perfect intonation of notes and emphasis on melody, Also, Slow-tempo raga development, long and sustained pitches, usually traditional ragas, use of sargam, very little bol-baant, clarity of text pronunciation, use of some Carnatic ragas and raga features, emphasis on vocal as opposed to instrumental form. Highly decorative and complex taans.
Bhendibazaar gharana	Chhajju Khan, Nazeer Khan, Khadim Hussain Khan	Late-19th century	Aman Ali Khan, Anjanibai Malpekar, Amir Khan, Shivkumar Shukla, T. D. Janorikar	Emphasis on breath control to be able to sing long passages in a single breath, use of merukhand for extended alaps, use of gamak taan and sargam, use of some Carnatic ragas.
Jaipur-Atrauli gharana	Alladiya Khan	Late-19th century	Kesarbai Kerkar, Mogubai Kurdikar, Mallikarjun Mansur, Kishori Amonkar, Ashwini Bhide-Deshpande	Repertoire of rare and complex ragas, based on Agra gharana, use of aakaar for badhat, heavy use of teentaal, rupak, jhaptaal and ada-chautaal, rhythmic play, use of bol-baant and bol-taan, rippling taans, heavy emphasis on taans.
Patiala gharana	Fateh Ali Khan "Karnail", Ali Baksh Khan "Jarnail"	Late-19th century	Bade Ghulam Ali Khan, Fateh Ali-Amanat Ali Khan, Vasantrao Deshpande, Jagdish Prasad, Ajoy Chakrabarty, Kaushiki Chakraborty	Patiala is often considered to be the amalgamate of few pre-existing gharanas and has claimed to combine the musical traditions of Delhi gharana, Gwalior gharana and Jaipur-Atrauli Gharana and is known for borrowing elements from other gharanas. This Gharana is also known for its versatility, not only known for its Khayal singing but also for venturing into other forms of classical music and placing a strong foothold there as well. Emphasis on voice development, roughly similar emphasis on melody and rhythm, bol-baant-like sargam with occasional tonic transpositions, occasional use of bol-taan, variety of taans, fast sargam and taan patterns, may or may not include antara, influence of tappa style.
Rampur-Sahaswan gharana	Inayat Hussain Khan	Mid 19th century	Mushtaq Hussain Khan, Shanno Khurana, Rashid Khan (musician), Nissar Hussain Khan, Ghulam Mustafa Khan (singer), Ghulam Sadiq Khan, Ghulam Abbas Khan	Emphasis on melody, bol-taans, sargam taans, highly varied aakar taans and good hold over laykari, along with strong command over Tarana.
Indore gharana	Amir Khan	Mid-20th century	Pandit Amarnath, Kankana Banerjee, Singh Bandhu	Slow-tempo and leisurely raga development, improvisation mostly in lower and middle octaves, tendency towards serious and expansive ragas, emphasis on melody, judicious use of pause between improvisations, bol alap and sargam using merukhand patterns, sparing application of murki, use of kan swaras in all parts of performance, controlled use of embellishments to preserve introspective quality, rare use of tihai, careful enunciation of text, may or may not include antara, multiple laya jatis in a single taan, mixture of taan types in a single taan, known for ruba'idar tarana (considered similar to chhota khyal).
Mewati gharana	Ghagge Nazir Khan	Mid-19th Century	Pandit Maniram, Ghulam Qadir Khan, Jasraj, Sanjeev Abhyankar, Kala Ramnath	Emphasizes balance between melody and bhava, kana gayaki, merukhand alaps and taans, and sargam. Strong spiritual and contemplative repertoire marked by qawwals and bhajans. Also an instrumental gharana.
Sham Chaurasia gharana	Miyan Chand Khan, Miyan Suraj Khan	Late-16th Century	Salamat Ali and Nazakat Ali Khan	Emphasis on layakari using bol-taan and tihai, fast sargam and taan patterns
Kunwar Shyam gharana	Goswami Lalji Maharaj ("Kunwar Shyam")	Late 19th century	Laxman Prasad Jaipurwale, Govind Prasad Jaipurwale, Bhavdeep Jaipurwale, Amit Chaudhuri	Meend-based alap, intracate taan patterns and laykari
Panchakshara gharana	Panchakshara Gawai, Puttaraj Gawai	Late 19th century	Panchakshara Gawai, Puttaraj Gawai, Basavaraj Rajguru, Arjun Sa Nakod, Chandrashekhar Puranik Math, Sheshadri Gawai, Siddaram Korwar, Panchakshari Swamimati Katti, Venkatesh Kumar, many more	Puttaraj Gawai conducted a spiritual and artistic study of the Panchakshara Swara Lipi and musicology, and composed new kritis and bandishas based on it. In the books they authored—Hindustani Gaanasudha Part 1 and Hindustani Gaanasudha Part 2—they hand-wrote notations for 66 ragas in Braille script. The gharana has one of the longest lineages of disciples, following traditional guru–shishya parampara.

==== Dhrupad traditions ====
The dhrupad tradition includes four original styles:

- Dagarbani ("sadharani geeti")
- Gauharbani gharana|Gauharbani
- Khandarbani gharana
- Nauharbani gharana

Today's surviving dhrupad traditions are descendants of the aforementioned four styles.

- Dagar gharana, founded by the Dagar family
- Bishnupur gharana, founded by Kirtankars in West Bengal (13th century)
- Darbhanga gharana, founded in Darbhanga, Bihar
- Dumraon Gharana, Buxar, Bihar founded by Dumraon Maharaj, and musician Pandit Ghanarang Dubey
- Bettiah gharana, founded in Bettiah, Bihar
- Talwandi gharana
- Mewati gharana, founded by Wahid Khan (Beenkar) and Ghagge Nazir Khan. Descended from Khandarbani gharana.
- Kalpi gharana

==== Thumri traditions ====
In the Benares gharana, the words in the text of a song are musically embellished to bring out their meaning, while the Lucknow gharana presents intricately embellished and delicate thumris that are explicit in their eroticism. The principal feature of the thumri of the Patiala gharana is its incorporation of the tappa from the Punjab region. It is with this tappa element that the Patiala gharana makes its impact, departing from the khyal-dominated Benares thumris and the dance-oriented Lucknow thumris. The Benares gharana was founded by Kirtankars in the 13th century and revived by Siddheshwari Devi, Rasoolan Bai, Badi Moti Bai, Mahadev Mishra, Girija Devi (mid-20th century) and Savita Devi.

=== Instrumental traditions ===
==== Tabla traditions ====
The following are the six widely accepted gharanas (ordered based on chronology of founding):

- Delhi gharana is the oldest of the tabla gharanas
- Ajrara gharana is an offshoot of and closely associated with the Delhi Gharana
- Lucknow gharana has rhythmic development through Kathak
- Benares gharana
- Punjab gharana, popularized by Alla Rakha and Zakir Husain, developed through its original Pakhavaj repertoire
- Farrukhabad gharana is the youngest accepted tabla gharana, and an offshoot of all of the Gharanas, featuring their main concepts

Gharana	Founding artists	Approximate founding date	Founding location	Famous exponents
Delhi gharana	Siddhar Khan	Early 18th century	Delhi	Ghami Khan, Imam Ali Khan, Munnu Khan, Latif Ahmed Khan, Shafaat Ahmed Khan
Ajrara gharana	Kallu Khan, Miru Khan	Early 19th century	Ajrara	Habibuddin Khan, Mehboob Hussain Khan, Sudhirkumar Saxena, Manju Khan, Yusuf Khan, Ramjan Khan, Sarwar Sabri, Akram Khan
Lucknow gharana	Miyan Bakshu	19th century	Lucknow	Ilmas Hussain Khan, Timir Roy Chowdhury, Achchan Maharaj, Anil Bhattacharjee, Biswajit Bhattacharjee, Santosh Biswas, Swapan Chaudhuri, Faiyaz Khan
Benares gharana	Ram Sahai	Late 18th century	Benares	Ram Sahai, Kanthe Maharaj, Anokhelal Mishra, Shamta Prasad, Kishen Maharaj, Mahapurush Mishra, Kumar Bose, Ananda Gopal Bandopadhyay, Samar Saha, Sandeep Das
Farrukhabad gharana	Haji Vilayat Ali Khan	19th century	Farrukhabad	Ustad Amir Hussain Khan, Masit Khan, Ahmedjan Thirakwa, Jnan Prakash Ghosh, Keramatullah Khan, Kanai Dutta, Shyamal Bose, Shankar Ghosh, Anindo Chatterjee, Bickram Ghosh
Punjab gharana	Miyan Qader Baksh	19th century	Punjab	Qadeer Buksh, Shaukat Hussein Khan, Alla Rakha Khan, Zakir Hussain, Yogesh Samsi, Abdul Sattar Tari Khan

==== Sitar traditions ====
- Etawah gharana
- Maihar gharana
- Senia gharana
- Indore gharana (Beenkar gharana)
- Jaipur-Atrauli gharana
- Mewati gharana

==== Sarod traditions ====
- Senia-Maihar gharana
- Senia-Shahjahanpur gharana
- Lucknow-Shahjahanpur gharana
- Senia-Bangash gharana

==== Other instruments ====
- Bishnupur gharana (Dhrupad, Rudra Veena, Sitar, Esraj)
- Sopori-Sufiana Gharana (Santoor)

=== Dance traditions ===
In Kathak performers today generally draw their lineage from four major schools of Kathak: the Jaipur-Atrauli gharana, the Lucknow dance gharana, the Benares gharana (born in the courts of the Kachwaha Rajput kings, the Nawab of Oudh, and Varanasi respectively.) and the Raigarh gharana (born in the court of Maharaja Chakradhar Singh of Raigarh.)

The Lucknow gharana remains the most popular throughout the country. However, in recent time the Atrauli-Jaipur gharana has caught up and today most performers throughout India perform techniques belonging to both styles. With amalgamation of the techniques and poses from other dance forms, the purity of the movements and gestures may be diluted or modified along with the contemporary trends. Raigarh gharana is famous for its own distinctive composition and thousands of followers.
