= Tanras Khan =

19th century musician of Indian classical music (1801 - 1890)

Ustad Tanrus Khan
- Born: Mir Qutub Baksh c. 1801
- Died: c. 1890
- Occupations: Vocalist and royal court musician and music teacher of the Mughal emperor

Qutub Bakhsh, more commonly known as Tanras Khan (c. 1801 – c. 1890), was an Indian classical vocalist of the Delhi qawwal gharana. He was a court musician and music teacher to the last Mughal emperor Bahadur Shah Zafar II.

== Background ==
Qutub Baksh was born to a musical family and initiated into music by his father, Qadir Baksh or of Dasna, who had been employed as a court singer for Shah Alam II. He became a disciple of Miyan Achpal of the Delhi court (alias of Ghulam Hussain Khan) in order to further develop his music.

== Early life and career ==
Mughal emperor Bahadur Shah Zafar had conferred upon Qutub Bakhsh the title of "Tanras" - "one who has charming taans" - on account of his swift, sparkling taans.

Tanras Khan additionally sang qawwalis, and is understood to be a member of the 'Qawwal Bachchon Ka Delhi Gharana' tracing its descent back to the legendary 13th-century musician Amir Khusrow. Many khyals and taranas of Hindustani classical music were composed by Tanrus Khan. Tanrus Khan was attached to the Delhi court but after the Mutiny of 1857, he left Delhi and went to Gwalior, and then later to the court of the Nizam of Hyderabad. He died in Hyderabad around 1885.

== Legacy ==
In some contexts or usages, the term "Delhi gharana" indicates the familial and pedagogical descendants of Tanras Khan. Some notable names include:

- Ustad Umrao Khan (Tanrus Khan's son)
- Ustad Sardar Khan (Umrao Khan's son)
- Ustad Manzoor Ahmed Khan Niazi
- Ustad Munshi Raziuddin
- Qawwal Bahauddin Khan
- Ustad Abdullah Manzoor Niazi
- Ustad Meraj Ahmed Nizami
- Ustad Fareed Ayaz
- Ustad Abu Muhammad
- Hamza Akram Qawwal and brothers
- Ali Akbar Razi
- Ghayoor Ahmed
- Ustad Naseeruddin Sami
- Qawal Najmuddin Saifuddin & Brothers,
- Subhan Ahmed Nizami
- Fattah Turab Qawwal
- Saami Brothers

It is also widely known that the founders of Patiala gharana had studied under the tutelage of Tanras Khan, the founder of the Delhi gharana. According to Manorama Sharma, author of the book, 'Tradition of Hindustani Music' (2006):

"In a very big function, the ceremony of Ganda-Bandhan was performed and both Ali Baksh and Fateh Ali became the disciples of Ustad Tanras Khan. In 1890, after the death of Ustad Tanras Khan, Ali Baksh and Fateh Ali became the disciples of Ustad Haddu Khan and Ustad Hassu Khan of Gwalior Gharana. Afterwards, they also received training from Ustad Bahadur Hussain Khan of Rampur. Thus, it is apparent that Ali Baksh and Fateh Ali received training from the well known musicians and later developed their own style which became famous as the Patiala Gharana. Both of them began to be known as Aliya and Fattu."
