= Allah Hoo =

Traditional Sufi chant

Allah Hoo (Arabic: الله هو, romanized: Allāh Hū) is a traditional Islamic Sufi form of dhikr (remembrance of God), consisting of the repeated invocation of the Divine name Allah and Hū, the Qur'anic third-person singular pronoun referring to Allah and widely employed in Sufi devotional practice. In the Naqshbandi tradition, the litany Allāhu Allāhu Allāhu Ḥaqq ("Truth") is traditionally traced through the order's spiritual lineage (silsila) to Abu Bakr.

== Etymology ==
The "Hoo" is due to the nominative suffix (i`rab) -u (ḍamma) being pronounced before the initial vowel, as the word Allahu is run together several times: Allahu Allahu Allahu is rendered as /al:a:hual:a:hual:a:h/ (compare the phrase Allahu Akbar where the -u is also audible). In traditional Sufi chant, the length of the -u is exaggerated. As a noun phrase, the chant is interpreted as meaning "God is". Haqq is the Arabic word for "truth", so that the full dhikr translates to "God is. God is. God is Truth."

== Qawwali ==
Several distinct Urdu-language Sufi devotional qawwalis titled "Allah Hoo" (or Allāh Hū) exist in the qawwali tradition. Although they share the same title and the refrain "Allah Hoo", they often differ substantially in their lyrics and musical composition. Nusrat Fateh Ali Khan composed the qawwali "Allah Hoo" in the early 1970s, which became a staple of his live repertoire in Pakistan; like many of his qawwalis, it was performed for years in spiritual gatherings before official recordings became widely available in the 1980s, after he was signed by Oriental Star Agencies (OSA). Live recordings of "Allah Hoo" were commercially released by OSA following his 1985 UK tour, while a studio recording was subsequently issued by the label in 1988. The lyrics of Nusrat's "Allah Hoo" comprise traditional Islamic invocations, Sufi devotional poetry, and interpolated verses. The Sabri Brothers recorded a distinct qawwali titled "Allah Hoo" for their 1978 album Qawwali: Sufi Music from Pakistan, which is compositionally and lyrically distinct from Nusrat's. Another distinct qawwali titled "Allah Hoo" was recorded by Badar Miandad for his 1994 album Allah Hoo, Vol. 10. Among the various qawwalis bearing this title, Nusrat's is the best known and has been described as one of his signature qawwalis. Nusrat's "Allah Hoo" has been covered by numerous artists including Faiz Ali Faiz, Rahat Fateh Ali Khan, Master Saleem, Sher Miandad Khan, Asif Ali Khan Santoo, and the Rizwan-Muazzam Qawwali Group.

== Other musical works ==
The Islamic refrain and dhikr chant "Allah Hoo" has also been used in numerous Urdu and Punjabi devotional and popular songs, including works by Hans Raj Hans, Javed Bashir, Naseebo Lal, Saieen Zahoor, and Salman Ahmad, formerly of Junoon. In 2008, during the first season of Coke Studio (Pakistan), "Allah Hu" was performed by Ali Zafar and Saaein Tufail Ahmed. In 2012, during the second season of Coke Studio (India), "Allah Hoo" was performed by the Nooran Sisters in a composition by Hitesh Sonik. Sami Yusuf recorded the English-language song "Allahu" for his 2003 album Al-Muʽallim, while the Malaysian Nasheed group Raihan recorded "Allahu" in Urdu and Malay, based on Nusrat Fateh Ali Khan's qawwali "Allah Hoo.".

== See also ==
- Hu (Sufism)
