= Pandit Divyang Vakil =

Indian musician

'Guruji' Pandit Divyang Vakil
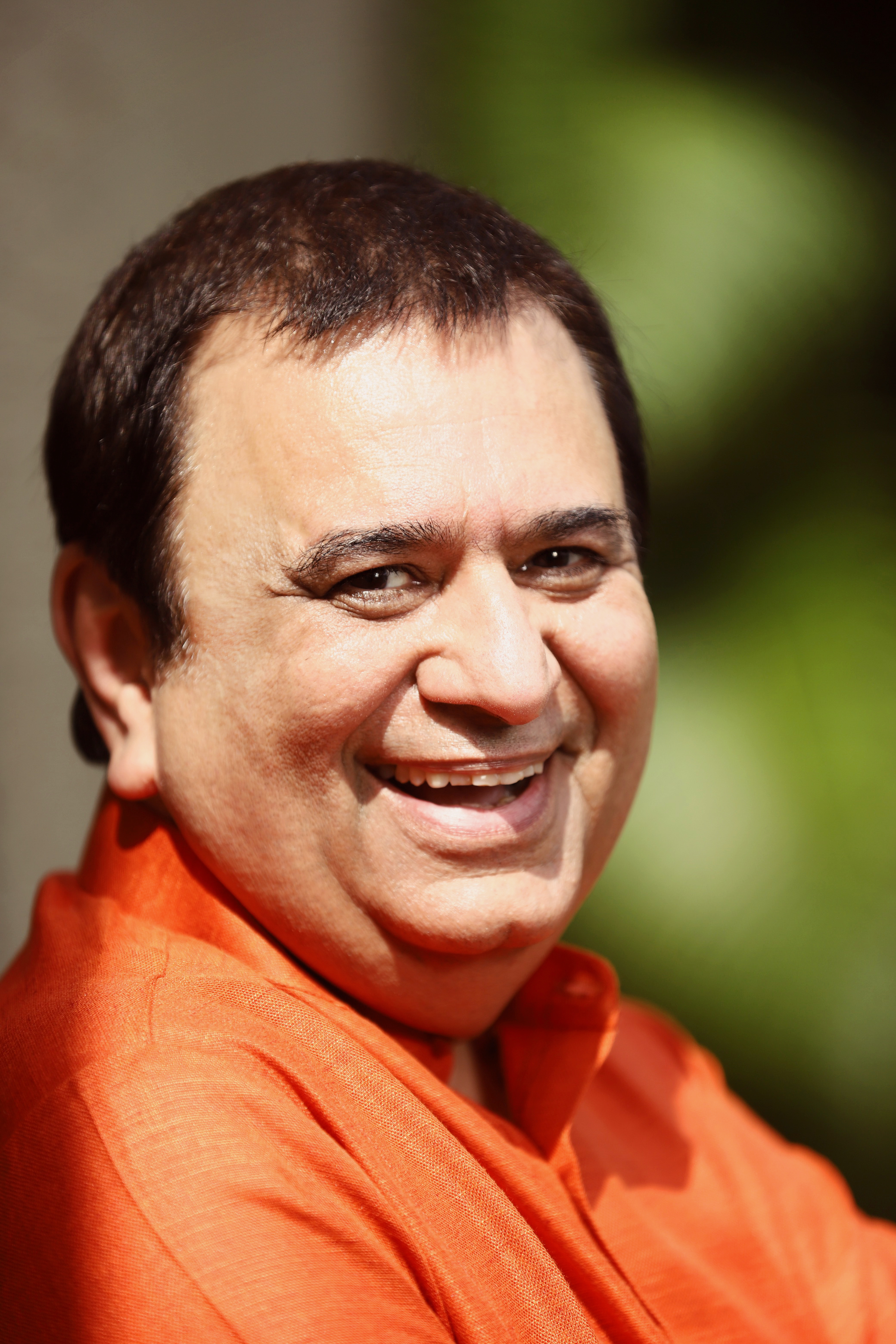
- Occupation: Tabla musician
- Organization(s): Taalim School of Indian Music, USA
- Awards: Gujarat Gaurav Puraskar, 2014
- Website: panditdivyangvakil.com

Pandit Divyang Vakil is a Tabla and rhythm musician known for intricate rhythm compositions.

== Life and work ==
=== Musical career ===
Pandit Divyang Vakil received formal training in Indian classical percussion instrument Tabla under the tutelage of not one but three Gurus from different Gharanas; Pandit Sudhirkumar Saxena of the Ajrada gharana, Ustad Latif Ahmed Khan of the Delhi gharana and Ustad Allarakha Khan of the Punjab gharana. Pandit Vakil has also accompanied many of the great masters of Indian classical music including Pt. Nikhil Banerjee and Pt. Maniramji.

Nearly 30 years ago, Pandit Divyang Vakil renounced his career as a tabla performer to dedicate himself wholeheartedly to teaching, composing and spiritual pursuits.

=== Tabla Guru ===
In 2019, Pandit Divyang Vakil (affectionately known as 'Guruji' to his students) completed his 40th year of teaching Tabla. He has taught thousands of students and produced innumerable professionals globally through his expansive teaching career spanning over 4 decades. He is the founder of Rhythm Riders Music Institute in Ahmedabad, Gujarat. An affiliated institute of Rhythm Riders Music Institute is the Taalim School of Indian Music in the US, which is run by American disciples of Pandit Divyang Vakil. His students have also established Tabla schools in places such as Australia, Korea, UK and various locations across the US.

=== Composer ===
As a composer, Guruji Pandit Divyang Vakil is known for his intricate rhythm compositions. He has been teaching the concepts of rhythm and guiding numerous musicians and drummers globally to adapt the fundamentals of the Indian classical rhythm system onto their own instrument creating new rhythmic structures while demonstrating the universality of rhythm. In 2011, he collaborated with South Korean musician Yu Kyung-hwa. Vakil composed a piece for Yu to play on the traditional Korean instrument, the Janggu, and set it to popular Indian rhythms. The piece debuted in February 2011 at Rhythm Riders Music Institute in Ahmedabad, India. The following month Pandit Ji was invited to compose and teach Indian rhythms and theory to Korean artists in an international music exchange program.

Pandit Divyang Vakil is well known for his contemporary classical Tabla ensemble compositions 'Tabla Triveni', 'Tabla Taandav', 'Tabla Tarkhat' and 'Tālavya' to name a few. Through his compositions, Pandit Vakil has given a modern form to Indian classical Tabla playing.

==== Tālavya ====
Formerly known as the Tabla Ecstasy, Talavya is a contemporary Indian Classical Percussion Ensemble that explores the capabilities of expressing the Indian Classical Hand Drum Tabla as a rhythmic as well as a melodic instrument. The ensemble performs compositions by Guruji Pandit Divyang Vakil. Tabla Ecstasy, Power of Tabla, Ardha Taal Chakravyuha are a few of his full length instrumental ensemble pieces which are essentially contemporary compositions by Guruji Pt. Divyang Vakil that Talavya performs. In 2007, his tabla duet called Power of Tabla was the first musical performance by Gujarati artists to be performed in the history of IIM-Ahmedabad Chaos Festival. One of his most difficult works is Ardha Taal Chakra (literally meaning "circle of half rhythms"). Ardha Taal Chakra explored half-beat Indian rhythm cycles. Created in 2006, it was recomposed and renamed in 2010 to become Ardha Taal Chakravyuha. All the group Tabla works retain the essence of the Indian Classical Music while showcasing synchronization of complex rhythms transitioning to smooth meditative passages not usually associated with drumming. Talavya has also performed at notable events and locations such as the Chico World Music Festival, held in Chico, California, United States, Symphony Space, NYC, TEDx ASB Events at Mumbai, India, The INK Conference at Jaipur, India, Queens University of Charlotte, USA, Lincoln Center, NYC, The Percussive Arts Society International Convention (PASIC™) 2013 at Indianapolis, USA and numerous other locations across North America. Talavya has collaborated with American percussionist and musician Mickey Hart, Canadian vocalist Shakura S’Aida, musician Sidi Touré and Cuban Fire.

==== Pradhanica ====
Pandit Divyang Vakil's latest work "Pradhanica", meaning 'female leader', is a collaborative stage production between the South Korean origin Kathak dancer, choreographer and Guruji Pandit Divyang Vakil's Tabla disciple Jin Won. Pradhanica is a 90-minute ensemble of World Drums and Indian classical dance form Kathak showcasing the contemporary side of the dance composed by Guruji Pandit Divyang and led by Jin Won . It essentially explores the possibilities of expressing emotions through rhythm and movement. The ensemble includes Pandit Divyang Vakil's disciple Mike Lukshis playing the Indian classical hand percussion instrument 'Tabla' along with Kaumil Shah on African Djembe, Vincent Pierce on the Latin American instrument Cajon and Indrajit Roy Choudhary on Indian classical string instrument Sitar.

Healing After Harm by Heena Patel

In this podcast, a long term disciple of Divyang Vakil opens up about her personal journey learning the Tabla from Divyang Vakil. She shares her experiences, insights and perspectives from her years of association with him. The discussion provides a firsthand experience of Guruji's mentorship and teaching styles.

== Awards ==
Pandit Divyang Vakil received the 'Gujarat Gaurav Puraskar' (Gujarat State honour) by the Gujarat Rajya Sangeet Natak Academy on 8 December 2014 for his years of contribution to the field of Indian classical music in an award ceremony held at the Gujarati Sahitya Parishad Hall.
