= Qawwal Bachchon ka Gharana =

Oldest khayal gharana of Hindustani Classical music tradition

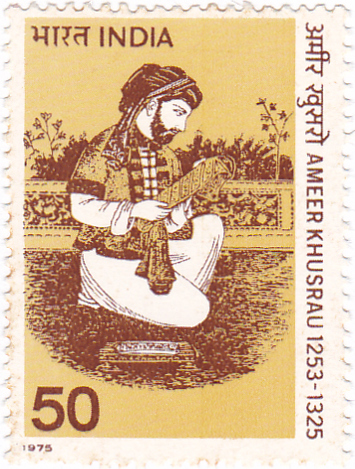
Amir Khusrau, founder of the Qawwal Bachchon ka Gharana

The Qawwal Bacchon Ka Gharana or Dilli Gharana is the oldest Qawwal gharana of the Hindustani Classical music tradition. It was founded by Amir Khusrau (1253-1325) and his students in the 13th century.

== History ==
The members of this gharana have lived in Delhi for many generations. The gharana was founded by the disciples of Amir Khusrau, a pioneer of qawwali, tarana and khayal. As a result, this gharana specializes in these genres.Tradition and historical practice within the lineage emphasize the preservation of Sufi poetry alongside traditional Samaa conventions.

== Pedagogical genealogy ==
Hazrat Amir Khusrau (progenitor)
Qawwal Bacchon (12 Disciples)
Zainulabdin; Khan	Shakkar Khan
Achapal Miyan (founder)	"Manarang"
Bade Muhammad; Khan (luminary)
Meer Qutub Baksh "Tanras Khan"
Umrao; Khan	Ghulam Ghaus; Khan	Bade Mubarak; Ali Khan	Bade Murad; Ali Khan	Waris Ali; Khan	Bade Munnawar; Ali Khan	Kutub Ali; Khan
Sanghi; Khan	Ali Baksh Khan & Fateh Ali Khan	Ghagge Nazir; Khan	Wahid Khan (beenkar)
Abdul Rahim & Abdul Karim Khan
Patiala Gharana; Parampara	Mewati Gharana; Parampara
Mamman Khan	Samman; Khan	Sugra; Khan	Kaley; Khan
Johan Khan (violin)	Chand; Khan	Bundu Khan (sarangiya)	Usman; Khan	Ramzan; Khan	Mammu; Khan
Zahoor Ahmed; Khan (violinist)	Hilal Ahmed; Khan	Zafar Ahmed; Khan (sitarist)	Shakil Ahmed; Khan (tabalist)	Nasir Ahmed; Khan	Mohammed Ali; Khan (sursagarist)
Iqbal Ahmad; Khan	Kamran Ahmed; Khan	Imran Ahmed; Khan	Tanvir Ahmed; Khan

== Style ==
Members of this gharana approach raagdari with more freedom than the dhrupad-informed gharanas, like Gwalior, Jaipur, and Agra. Emphasis on bhav and exposition are the hallmarks of this style. In addition to khayal compositions, the gharana is known for its qawwalis.

In addition to the branch of the Delhi gharana which performs this type of qawwali-influenced khyal, there is also another branch of musicians claiming connection to this gharana by marriage relations, including Mamman Khan, Chand Khan and Iqbal Ahmed Khan. These musicians are known to have historically been sarangi-playing accompanists, but more recently have also performed khyal.

== Exponents ==
- Amir Khusrau
- Ghagge Nazir Khan
- Wahid Khan
- Munshi Raziuddin
- Ustad Naseeruddin Saami
- Manzoor Ahmed Khan Niazi
- Fareed Ayaz
- Abdullah Niazi Qawwal
- Bahauddin Khan
- Tanras Khan
- Warsi Brothers
- Fateh Ali Khan
- Nusrat Fateh Ali Khan
- Farrukh Fateh Ali Khan
- Rahat Fateh Ali Khan
- Sher Miandad
