= Farrukh Fateh Ali Khan =

Pakistani musician (1952–2003)

Ustad Farrukh Fateh Ali Khan
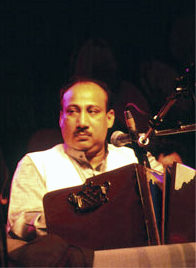
- Born: Farrukh Fateh Ali Khan; 25 December 1952; Lyallpur, Punjab, Pakistan
- Died: 9 September 2003 (aged 50)
- Known for: Harmonium player
- Children: Rahat Fateh Ali Khan
- Father: Fateh Ali Khan
- Relatives: Nusrat Fateh Ali Khan (brother); Mubarak Ali Khan (singer) (uncle); Shahzaman Ali Khan (grandson); Rizwan-Muazzam (nephews)
- Musical career
- Genres: Qawwali, ghazal
- Years active: 1965–2003

Farrukh Fateh Ali Khan (Urdu: فرخ فتح علی خان) (25 December 1952 – 9 September 2003) was a Pakistani musician, who played the harmonium in Qawwali music. He was a member of the well-known family of Qawwali musicians, the Qawwal Bacchon ka gharana (Delhi gharana). He was the younger brother of Nusrat Fateh Ali Khan, the son of Fateh Ali Khan, the nephew of Mubarak Ali Khan, and the father of Rahat Fateh Ali Khan.

== Biography ==
Following the death of Fateh Ali Khan, Nusrat Fateh Ali Khan became the leader of the family qawwali party from 1964 until his death in 1997. Farrukh studied music including the harmonium under the tutelage of Nusrat. Initially, Farrukh sporadically performed with Nusrat before becoming a permanent member of the qawwali party in 1971. Alongside Dildar Hussain, Farrukh was the only performer who remained a permanent member of Nusrat's qawwali party from 1971 till Nusrat's death in 1997.

Farrukh played the lead harmonium, and provided accompanying vocals. His talent often went unrecognized due to playing in the shadow of Nusrat. Farrukh had a wealth of musical knowledge and was a central figure in the group, with his virtuosity on the harmonium and his contributions as the second or sometimes third vocalist. His talent for playing the harmonium in all scales and his ability to switch a tune at a moment's notice were arguably the best in his profession. While accompanying Nusrat in England, he became known as Harmonium Raja Sahib (King of the Harmonium). Farrukh also sometimes assisted Nusrat in composing the musical arrangements sung by the party. During more than 25 years as a member of Nusrat's qawwali party, Farrukh helped bring qawwali music to international audiences through performances in over 40 countries.

Farrukh remained a member of the qawwali party when its leadership was taken over by his son, Rahat Fateh Ali Khan, after Nusrat's death in 1997. However, under Rahat's leadership, the party did not continue to perform with the same frequency or in the same configuration as they did with Nusrat at the helm. Farrukh Fateh Ali Khan died on 9 September 2003.

== Farrukh, Nusrat & Rahat ==
Both Farrukh and Rahat often accompanied Nusrat and were a part of his team. They carried forward Nusrat's legacy after his death in 1997. Farrukh and Rahat made their Bollywood debut together for the 2003 film Paap, which released a few months after Farrukh's death.

== See also ==
- Harmonium
- List of Pakistani qawwali singers
- Qawwali
- Nusrat Fateh Ali Khan
- Rahat Fateh Ali Khan
