= Sudhir =

Sudhir is an Indian masculine given name. The Sanskrit word sudhīra means "very wise", "resolute".

Notable people with the name include:

- Sudhir (Pakistani actor) (1922–1997), Pakistani actor
- Sudhir (Hindi actor) (1944–2014), Bollywood actor
- Sudhir, Indian Para Powerlifter
- Sudhir Chaudhary (journalist), Indian journalist
- Sudhir Dalvi (born 1939), Indian actor
- Sudhir Joshi (1948–2005), Indian Marathi actor and comedian
- Sudhir Kakar (born 1938), Freudian psychoanalyst and writer
- Sudhir Kumar Baliyan, Indian politician
- Sudhir Kumar Chaudhary (born 1983), fan of the Indian cricket team
- Sudhir Kumar Chitradurga, Indian weightlifter
- Sudhir Kumar Giri, Indian politician
- Sudhir Kumar Saxena, Tabla artist and professor
- Sudhir Mishra, Indian film director and screenwriter
- Sudhir Naik (born 1945), Indian cricketer
- Sudhir Pandey, Indian film and serial television actor
- Sudhir Phadke (1919–2002), Marathi singer-composer from India
- Sudhir Ranjan Majumdar (1934–2009), Chief Minister of Tripura, India, 1988–1992
- Sudhir Ruparelia (born 1956), businessman and entrepreneur in Uganda
- Sudhir Tailang (1960–2016), Indian cartoonist
- Sudhir Alladi Venkatesh (born 1966), Indian sociologist and urban ethnographer
