= Abaji (musician) =

Lebanese singer and composer (born 1958)

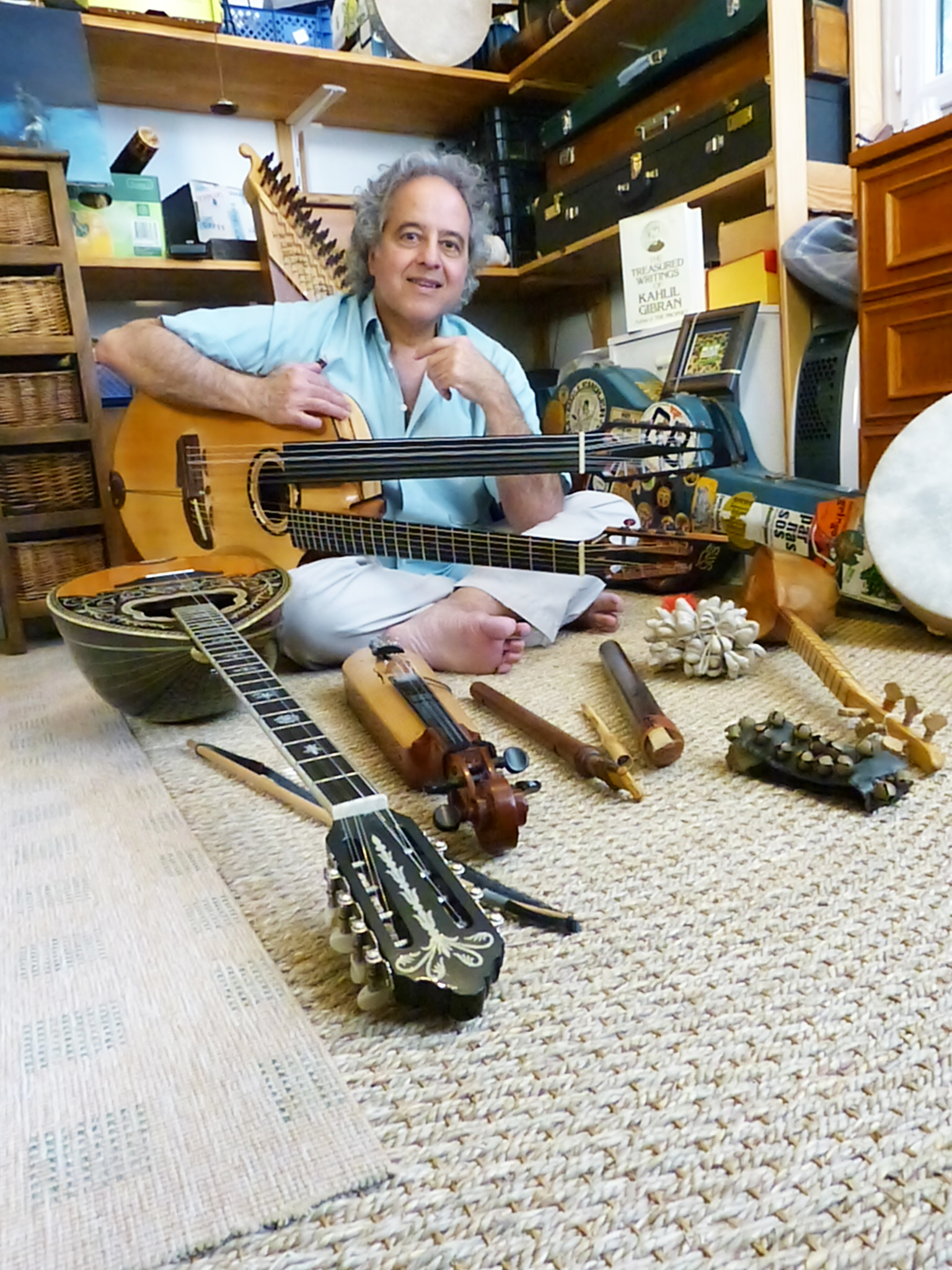

Background information
- Born: 19 August 1958 (age 67); Beirut, Lebanon
- Genres: Blues Oriental, film score
- Occupations: Composer, multi-instrumentalist
- Instruments: guitar, oud, bouzouki, clarinet, percussion
- Labels: Absilone, Cézame Music Agency, Kosinus
- Website: http://www.abaji.net/

Abaji is an Armenian singer, songwriter, composer and multi-instrumentalist.

== Biography ==
=== Early life ===
Abaji was born in Beirut, to a Greek father, who left the Greek city of Smyrna in 1922, and an Armenian-Lebanese mother from Istanbul.

He spent part of his childhood and early teenage years in Lebanon capital city, where he discovered music. He started to play the folk guitar at the age of 11. He had both the influence of Greek music from his family's heritage and of Oriental music that he was exposed to in the streets of Istanbul.

In February 1976 when Abaji was 17, the war in Lebanon forced him into exile. Upon his arrival in France, he started at a boarding school in a neighbourhood near Paris. That is when he began to write songs. Abaji says he was born again from that moment. As a teenager he was inspired by Cat Stevens, Bob Dylan, Fairuz and Ravi Shankar. He sees in Jimmy Page the perfect guitarist, for being able to experiment with both electric and acoustic guitars. Being attracted by experimentation and discoveries himself, Abaji has always found fascinating the way Page could make percussion with the strings and produce aerial sounds on an electric guitar.

Before establishing his music career further, Abaji studied and has been specialised in Chinese medicine and tai chi, which he has practiced for over forty years. He became a therapist working for the psychiatric emergency services in Paris, using his tai chi and relaxation techniques with the patients.

== Music career ==
During Abaji's debut years he met film score composer Gabriel Yared, who made an impact on his career

Abaji started to get known as the “Bedouin's Troubadour” and began opening shows for artists such as Geoffrey Oryema, John Mc Laughlin and Suzanne Vega among others.

=== The Artist ===
Abaji is an avid collector of instruments from all over the world. He owns over 300 instruments, which he has acquired in his travels and concert tours from countries such as: United States, New Zealand, South Africa, Pakistan, India, Lebanon, Morocco, Costa Rica, Oceania and Central America as well as many other countries in Africa and Europe.

He loves improvisation and experimenting with new instruments. He sets himself to learn to play a new instrument every 4 to 5 months; he can play instruments such as: saz, zarb, flutes, bamboo saxophone, duduk.

His passion of lutherie and ancient instruments has inspired him to invent a 5-string sitar-guitar that he plays with a violin bow.

=== Albums ===
Abaji's has a mix of Oriental and Blues music in his style. He writes lyrics in Arabic, English and French. His debut album Paris-Beyrouth was released in 1996 with Francis Varis playing the accordion. One of the album's songs, Zahra Hamra was chosen for the “Planète compilation” album by Radio France International.

This debut album won him an invitation by guitarist Jean-Félix Lalanne to participate in the event “Autour de la Guitare” in the Olympia venue in Paris. Abaji also collaborated on the album Desert Blues 2 with the song "Gibran" in tribute to poet Khalil Gibran released by Network Medien record label in 2002 which becomes an international success.

In 2003 he released his second album Oriental Voyage with Network Medien record label. This is a tribute album to his great-grandmothers from Armenia and Greece. In this album he plays the oud, harp-guitar, bouzouki, sitar-guitar, daff, harmonica and flute in which songs such as Raml (Sand), Maa (Water), El Wahha (The Oasis) and Nejmet (Stars) can evoke the sounds of the desert.

On his next album Nomad Spirit, Abaji invited Indian percussionist Ramesh Shotham with his Thavil, Moroccan oud and guembri player Majid Bekkas and Armenian duduk master Djivan Gasparyan to take part on the recording. Later on, he went on to tour to Germany together with Ramesh Shotham. In this album Abaji is inspired by the spiritual heritage of his great-grandfathers from Smyrna and Aleppo.

In 2009, Abaji released the album Origine Orients where he sings in five languages: French, Arabic, Turkish, Greek and Armenian. This album is recorded in two days with only one take per track. Abaji usually gets himself involved thoroughly in all of the process of recording, mixing, and mastering.

He got a special invitation to play Lahore, Pakistan with Qawwali musicians of Nusrat Fateh Ali Khan’s family.

His most recent album of 17 tracks Route & Roots was part recorded in Armenia with duduk player Vardan Grigoryan and part in Paris with Kurdish musician Mahmut Demir. This album takes him to tour in over 60 countries including South Africa, Vanuatu Island, Panama and Costa Rica.

In 2010 Abaji played for the popular Tiny Desk Concert series by NPR Music at the Kennedy Center in Washington.

He has also collaborated with Pakistani virtuoso singer Ustad Naseeruddin Saami.

=== Film, TV, dance and theatre music ===
Abaji has worked as a music composer for TV shows, live shows and film. He recorded over 35 albums including Elements, which has been used as score in several films and documentaries. The thematic of the albums varies including India, Exile, the Middle East, the Investigation series focused in a geographic area, among others. All of his music has been used either for global television shows or film scores.

He regularly works for music agencies Kosinus and Cézame in Paris composing music for TV and films.

Abaji has composed music for theatre and dance. He has produced various shows together with Lebanese dancer Nawal Raad.

In 2016 the label 1 Revolution Music, directed by trailer music composer Yoav Goren, released Abaji's work called Middle East Soundscapes.

== Discography ==
- 1996 : Paris-Beyrouth
- 2000 : Bedouin Blues
- 2003 : Oriental Voyage
- 2005 : Nomad spirit
- 2005 : Les mille et une nuits (Musical accompaniment to stories told by Jihad Darwiche)
- 2009 : Origine Orients
- 2016 : Route&Roots
