= Philip Francis =

Philip Francis may refer to:

- Philip Francis (translator) (1708–1773), English translator
- Philip Francis (politician) (1740–1818), English politician
- Philip Francis (golfer), American golfer
- Philip V. Francis (1964–2008), tabla player, composer and Ghazal singer from Kerala, India
- Philip Francis, Prince of Leyen (1766–1829), German nobleman
