= Philip V. Francis =

Indian tabla player and composer

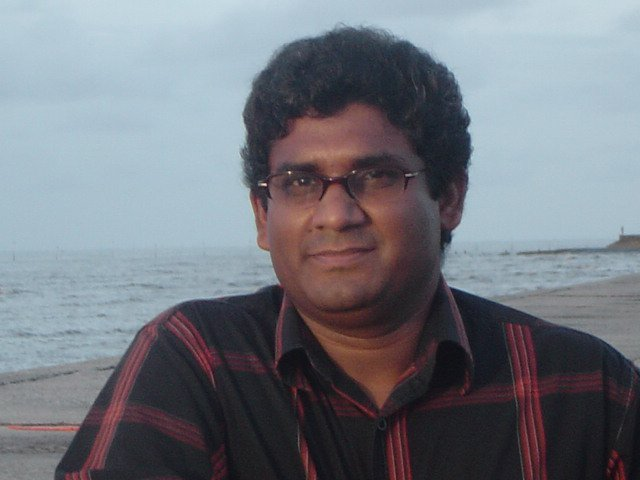

Background information
- Born: 5 November 1964
- Origin: Thrissur, India
- Died: 4 March 2008 (aged 43)
- Genres: Hindustani classical music, Ghazal, pop
- Occupations: Musician, singer, composer, tabla
- Instruments: tabla, guitar, singing
- Years active: 1980–2008

Philip V. Francis (5 November 1964 – 4 March 2008) was a musician from Thrissur, Kerala, India. He was a versatile artist who excelled in playing various instruments such as tabla, guitar, keyboard and was also famous as a composer and Ghazal singer. He died at the age of 43 in a bike accident, leaving his wife Vidhu and son Johann.

== Education ==
Philip was born in Thrissur, Kerala. Philip started his career as a conga drum player in the local orchestra group called Neelambari. Under the guidance of Joboy, a renowned player of drums from Kerala, he learned the nuances of rhythm. He also learnt carnatic music and mrudangam for brief stints under Komattil Shanta Kumari and Purushothama Sharma, two eminent teachers of music in Thrisssur at that time.

Philip's thirst to learn the intricacies and depths of music made him move to Delhi to learn Tabla under the maestro Ustad Fiyaz Khan of the Delhi gharana . He also completed his formal education in music at Gandharva Mahavidyala a premiere institute for Indian classical music simultaneously. He completed visharad in classical tabla, which is equivalent to MPhil. Thereafter, he emerged as a Tabla player of national repute. .

Philip was never satisfied with what he learnt and later on studied western classical music and mastered the Guitar and Piano too. He also started composing and conducting Choir in Churches in and around Thrissur.

His love for Ghazals saw him doing Ghazal programs and becoming popular as a Ghazal singer too in his short life span. He also worked with the late music Director Raveendran as an assistant in films such as soothradharan, arayanangalude veedu etc.

== Awards and achievements ==
Philip was the representative of the Delhi gharana School of music in Thrissur, Kerala and he had numerous disciples who were learning Tabla under him.

He has performed in All India Radio, Doordarshan, Kairali, Asianet etc. as an accompanist on the Tabla for many leading singers like S. Janaki, P. Jayachandran, Gayatri Asokan, Pradip Somasundaran and performed as a Ghazal singer in many of the Television channels

He was a graded Artist of All India Radio both as a Tabla player and as a composer and his compositions used to be regularly broadcast in the All India Radio.

The Govt. of India recognised his talents and in 2003 he was sent on a diplomatic mission to George Town, Guyana, South America as a cultural ambassador by ICCR . He was back to Kerala after his contract was over in 2006.

He was one among the 50 eminent people of Thrissur, honoured by the Corporation of Thrissur in 2007 for his contributions towards music. His last work as a music director was for the film "Oridathoru Puzhayundu" directed by "Kalavoor Ravikumar".

He was a major influence on many of the music directors and musicians of the younger generation like Alphons Joseph and Gayatri Asokan.

== Albums ==
1. Thoovana
2. Ninakkai Nadha Kanneer
3. Kabir
4. Abheri & Bhimpalas (2008)- Manorama Music
5. Philip-Sangeeth Ka Amar Sur (2009)- Ghazals
6. Habeebi El rooh 2000 (Miami Band, Kuwait)
7. Variations of Baburaj (2001) - Tribute to the legendary musician M. S. Baburaj through his songs

=== Film Score ===
- Oridathoru Puzhayundu

== Tributes ==
As a tribute music lovers of Thrissur formed "Piano", an organisation in his memory which aims to promote music and harmony. The organisation plans to hold a yearly music festival at Thrissur, and institute an endowment in his name on an academic level. "Piano" was formally inaugurated by the Nightingale of South India, "S. Janaki" on 3.05.08. Ustad Fiyaz Khan the Tabla Maestro and Philip's Guru was present on the occasion.
