= Fareed Ayaz =

Pakistani qawwali singer (born 1952)

- Born: Fariduddin Ayaz Al-Hussaini; 13 November 1952 (age 73); Hyderabad, India
- Occupation: Qawwal
- Known for: Qawwali; Sufi music; Ghazal; Hindustani classical music
- Awards: Pride of Performance Award by the President of Pakistan in 2006

Ghulam Fariduddin Ayaz Al-Hussaini Qawwal (born 13 November 1952) is a Pakistani Sufi devotional singer. He belongs to the well-known Qawwal family, known as the Qawwal Bacchon ka Gharana of Delhi.

Ayaz and his relatives are the flag-bearers of the Delhi gharana, a school of music. He performs various genres of Hindustani classical music, such as dhrupad, khayal, tarana, thumri, and dadra. He leads the qawwal party with his younger brother, Abu Muhammad Qawwal.

Ayaz is a descendant of Mir Qutub Bakhsh, who was awarded the title of Tanras Khan by the last Mughal Emperor Bahadur Shah Zafar in the 19th century. Tanras Khan was also the emperor's tutor in music and the court musician.

== Early life ==
Ghulam Fariduddin Ayaz Al-Hussaini was born in Hyderabad, India in 1952. In 1956, his family shifted to Karachi, Pakistan. He started his training in classical music with his father Munshi Raziuddin Ahmed Khan Qawwal. Their roots can be traced to the family tree of one of the earliest disciples of Amir Khusro. Their father Munshi Raziuddin Qawwal also used to sing with his cousins Qawwal Bahauddin Khan and Manzoor Niazi Qawwal (maternal uncle of Farid Ayaz) early in his career.

His nephew Hamza Akram is also a qawwali singer.

== Career ==
Fareed Ayaz & Abu Muhammad Qawwal Brothers are popular for their Sufi music performances. They are considered the most popular Qawwal party in Pakistan and one of the few left. They have performed in the United Kingdom, Australia, United States, Canada, France, Germany, Italy, Netherlands, Portugal, Austria, India, Bahrain, Kenya, Nepal, Zimbabwe, Bangladesh, Croatia, Turkey, Morocco, Greece, Egypt, Bulgaria, Tunisia, Belgium, Iran, Oman, United Arab Emirates, Saudi Arabia, Jordan, Romania, Mauritius, Hong Kong and South Africa.

They also performed at Aman ki Asha, organised by Times of India and Pakistan's Jang Group of Newspapers.

== Songs ==
- Kangna (2011) (performed in Raag Malkauns) Coke Studio (Pakistan) (featured in the 2012 film The Reluctant Fundamentalist)
- Mori Bangri (2011) Coke Studio (Pakistan)
- Aaj Rung Hai (2012) Coke Studio (Pakistan)
- Khabram Raseeda (2012) Coke Studio (Pakistan)
- Ghar Nari (2016) (featured in 2016 film Ho Mann Jahaan)
- Jaag Musafir (2016) (featured in 2016 film Mah e Mir)
- Khabar-e-Tahayyur-e-Ishq Sun (2016) (Drama OST Deewana (TV series))
- Nami Danam Ke Akhir Choon (with Urdu translation)- Fareed Ayaz
- "Balamwa" (2017) (featured in 2017 film Rangreza) - sung with Hamza Akram & Abu Muhammad
- Shikwa/Jawab-e-Shikwa (2018) Coke Studio Pakistan (season 11) collaboration with Natasha Baig
- Piya Ghar Aaya (2018) Coke Studio Pakistan (season 11)
- Aadam (2019) Coke Studio Pakistan (season 12)

== Awards and recognition ==
- Pride of Performance Award by the Government of Pakistan in 2006.

== See also ==
- List of Pakistani qawwali singers
