= Faiyaz =

- Pronunciation: Arabic: [ˈχɑːlɪd, ˈxæːled, ˈxaːlɪd]
- Gender: Male

Origin
- Origin: Arabic
- Meaning: "Leader" "helper" "Arbiter" "Judge" "Aesthetic".

Faiyaz (Devangari: फ़ैयाज़, Urdu: فیّاض) is an Arabic name which means "judge", "artistic", "aesthetic", "helper" or "leader".

People with the name include:

- Faiyaz Koya (born 1962), Fijian politician
- Faiyaz Khan (1886–1950), Indian classical vocalist
- Faiyaz Khan (tabla player) (1934–2014), Indian tabla player
- Muhammad Faiyaz Ali Khan (1851–1922), Indian administrator and philanthropist
- Brent Faiyaz (born 1995), American singer
- Faiyaz Kara, restaurant critic
