= Bade Mubarak Ali Khan =

Indian Hindustani classical vocalist

Mubarak Ali Khan
- Also known as: Bade Mubarak Ali Khan; Mubarak Ali Khan Jaipurwale
- Born: c. 1810s Lucknow
- Origin: Lucknow
- Died: c. 1880 Jaipur
- Genre: Indian classical music
- Occupation: Singer of Hindustani Classical music
- Years active: 1830s–1880

Mubarak Ali Khan, also known as Bade Mubarak Ali Khan or Mubarak Ali Khan Jaipurwale, (c. 1810s – c. 1880) was a Hindustani classical singer of the Qawwal Bachchon ka Gharana.

He was known for being the son and disciple of Bade Mohammed Khan, being the foremost practitioner of khayal of his time, and influencing generations of musicians who would go on to found other gharanas.

== Background ==
Bade Mubarak Ali Khan was born to famous Qawwal Bachchon ka Gharana singer Bade Mohammed Khan. Mukherjee claims he was an illegitimate son. Bade Mubarak Ali Khan was regarded for his phirat and extensive variety of taans.

Bade Mubarak Ali Khan became the most reputed musician of the Jaipur Court and was also greatly favored by the Scindia Court of Gwalior.

== Legacy ==
It is unknown whether Bade Mubarak Ali Khan formally taught disciples. However he greatly influenced many musicians who would go on to be influential such as Ghagge Nazir Khan of Mewati gharana, Natthan Khan of Agra gharana, and Alladiya Khan of Jaipur-Atrauli gharana. Musicians from the Patiala gharana claim that their founders, Ali Baksh Khan "Jarnail" and Fateh Ali Khan "Karnail" were taught by Bade Mubarak Ali Khan.

=== Jaipur-Atrauli gharana ===
Alladiya Khan was such an admirer of Bade Mubarak Ali Khan that he named his new gayaki after Jaipur as an homage. Some scholars suggest that Alladiya Khan sought formal discipleship from Bade Mubarak Ali Khan who refused the request because the latter was from an inferior caste. However, Bade Mubarak Ali Khan has no formal relationship with the Jaipur-Atrauli gharana of Alladiya Khan.
