= Hakkaniyat =

Hakkaniyat (in Arabic: حقانيات) is a secret Facebook group that only includes Syrian women and prohibits men from entering. Hakkaniyat was founded by "Haidy Hafy (in Arabic: هايدي حافي)" and the word "Hakkaniyat" is a Syrian colloquial word that derived from the word "AlHaqq". The goal of the group that brought together more than two hundred thousand girls is how to act and solve social problems, and speak freely, and later turned into a livelihood for some girls from who started working in the field of e-marketing.
