= Sudhirkumar Saxena =

Musician

Professor Sudhirkumar Saxena (1923 – 2007 in India) was a tabla artist Guru and professor.

He learnt the tabla performing art for years from Ustad Habeebuddin Khan, the doyen of the Ajrada gharana. Pandit Saxena was the first drummer in India to have worked as professor of tabla at a centre of higher learning. He retired from Maharaja Sayajirao University, Baroda, in 1983 as head of its music department, after serving the institution for thirty-three years. In his younger days (1945-1995), he participated in most of the major music conferences of the country as a tabla accompanist to many front-ranking musicians and dancers.

Spending his formative years in Meerut, he also graduated in Political Science. He in his era, played with most of the stalwarts of Indian Classical Music at that time. The speed of his hands on the "Baaya" i.e. the bigger of the two drums in tabla - which is the bass drum; was incredible. When he went to Russia, people were so amazed by the sound it produced that they suspected a pigeon being hidden inside somewhere to produce that sound!

He was an extremely humble person and one of the best Gurus one could ever meet. He never declined to teach anyone who came to him for help. Right from teaching seasoned musicians, he taught even naive beginners - sometimes free of cost.

His book The Art of Tabla Rhythm - Essentials, Tradition & Creativity is one of the best books written on Tabla. As he used to say, one can never learn Tabla from a book and one always requires a Guru to learn, but this book serves the purpose of reaching out to the world with the lovely traditions of the Indian Classical Music. He was pioneer of classical tabla playing in Gujarat. So many disciples like Late Pandit Madhukar Gaurav, Pandit Pushkar raj Shridhar, Pandit Ravindra Nikte, Pandit Kaluram Bhanvariya, and many more of first generation stallwords and then Dr. Anil Gandhi, Dr. Ajay Ashtaputre, Shri Chintan Patel, Shri Raju Joshi, Dr. Kedar Mukadam, Shri Nandkishor Date and many more which are reputed artist and performer, Academicians Many Number of students from Mauritius, Shri Lanka Nepal And Bangladesh also learned from him,, Mr. Dirpoul, Shri Niti ranjan Biswas, are some of the names

He was the first guru of tabla player Pandit Divyang Vakil.
