= Fateh Ali Khan (Qawwali singer) =

Pakistani singer

Ustad Fateh Ali Khan
- Born: 1901; Jullundur, Punjab, British India
- Died: 1964 (aged 62–63); Lyallpur (now called Faisalabad), Pakistan
- Occupation: Musician (Qawwali singer)
- Known for: Qawwali singing
- Relatives: Nusrat Fateh Ali Khan (son) Farrukh Fateh Ali Khan (son)
- Awards: Pride of Performance award by the President of Pakistan in 1960

Fateh Ali Khan (1901–1964), also known as Fateh Ali Khan Jullundhri Qawwal, was a Pakistani classical singer and qawwali musician active primarily in the 1940s and 1950s.

== Biography ==
Fateh Ali Khan was born in Jullundur, Punjab, British India in 1901. Following the Partition of India in 1947, Fateh Ali Khan and his family migrated to Pakistan, settling in Lyallpur (now Faisalabad), where he continued his musical career. Fateh Ali Khan was the father of Pakistani qawwali musicians, Nusrat Fateh Ali Khan and Farrukh Fateh Ali Khan. Their family has an unbroken tradition of qawwali and is called the Qawwal Bacchon gharana, linked closely to the Sufi Chishti Order for over 600 years.

=== Training ===
Fateh Ali Khan was trained in classical music and qawwali by his father, Maula Bakhsh Khan (Ali Khan), and he, soon after his training, distinguished himself as a skilled vocalist and instrumentalist. He learned to play traditional Indian instruments such as the sitar, sarod and vichitra veena as well as Western instruments like the violin. He also mastered thousands of verses in Punjabi, Urdu, Arabic and Persian.

=== Leader of Qawwali Party ===
Fateh Ali Khan was the leader of his family's qawwali party, which was commonly billed as Fateh Ali Khan, Mubarak Ali Khan & Party. His brother, Mubarak Ali Khan, shared vocal and harmonium-playing duties with him. In the late 1950s, Nusrat Fateh Ali Khan joined his father's qawwali party in his youth, initially performing as a tabla player while continuing to learn the art of qawwali singing. Regarded as two of the foremost exponents of qawwali in their era, Fateh Ali Khan and Mubarak Ali Khan played a pivotal role in popularizing the poetry of Allama Muhammad Iqbal through their singing. At the time, Iqbal's works were highly admired in academic and intellectual circles but had limited popular appeal among the general public, partly because his complex verses were considered difficult to set to music, and radio broadcasting in British India was still in its infancy.

Allama Iqbal paid the ultimate homage to the two brothers by saying: 'I was restricted to schools and colleges only. You, [sic] Ustad Fateh Ali Khan have spread my poetry through India'.

— Ruby, Ahmed Aqeel (1992). Nusrat Fateh Ali Khan. Words of Wisdom. p. 44.

In the 1950s, "Na To Butkade Ki Talab Mujhe" was one of the most popular qawwalis performed by Fateh Ali Khan and Mubarak Ali Khan. The lyrics were written by Ameer Bakhsh Sabri (also known as Ameer-e-Sabri). This qawwali directly inspired the melodies and structure of “Na To Caravan Ki Talash Hai” and “Yeh Ishq Ishq Hai” in the 1960 Bollywood film Barsaat Ki Raat. While many lyrics in the film version were newly written by Sahir Ludhianvi, some lines were adapted or lifted verbatim from Ameer Bakhsh Sabri’s original kalam (for example: Naaz-o-andaaz se kehte hain ki jeena hoga, zehar bhi dete hain to kehte hain ki peena hoga; jab main peeta hoon to kehte hain ki marta bhi nahin, jab main marta hoon to kehte hain ki jeena hoga — 'They tell me with elegant grace that I must live; they offer poison and say I must drink it. When I drink, they say I do not die; when I am dying, they say I must live." "Sahar Qareeb Hai Taaron Ka Haal Kya Hoga" was another 1950s qawwali by Fateh Ali Khan and Mubarak Ali Khan (written by Sehba Akhtar) that inspired the track "Nigah-e-Naaz Ke Maaron Ka Haal Kya Hoga" (commonly shortened to "Nigah-e-Naaz Ke") in Barsaat Ki Raat. "Nigah-e-Naaz Ke" borrowed its central hook and melodic structure from the original, most notably adapting the line “Teri nigah ke maaron ka haal kya hoga." Fateh Ali Khan and Mubarak Ali Khan performed in India on several occasions in the 1950s, a period in which their repertoire included Na To Butkade Ki Talab Mujhe, Woh Utha Khake Batha Se, Siddiq-e-Akbar Par Sadaqat Naaz Karti Hai, Sahar Qareeb Hai Taaron Ka Haal Kya Hoga, Main Ne Poocha Husn Se, Woh Nabiyon Mein Rehmat, and Allama Iqbal’s Shikwa and Jawab-e-Shikwa. Reportedly, producer R. Chandra obtained permission during this period from Fateh Ali Khan and Mubarak Ali Khan before adapting their qawwalis for the Barsaat Ki Raat soundtrack.

=== Legacy ===
In 1948, his son, Nusrat Fateh Ali Khan, was born in Faisalabad, Pakistan. Fateh Ali Khan wanted Nusrat to become a doctor or an engineer because he felt qawwali artists had low social status. However, Nusrat showed such interest in and aptitude for qawwali that his father soon relented, and began training him on tabla, harmonium, and the art of singing. Fateh Ali Khan died in 1964 at the age of sixty, when Nusrat was sixteen and still in school. Nusrat's training was completed by Fateh Ali Khan's brothers, Mubarak Ali Khan and Salamat Ali Khan. Nusrat went on to become a household name and is widely respected as the greatest exponent of qawwali.

== Awards and recognition ==
- Pride of Performance Award in 1960 by the President of Pakistan.

== See also ==
- List of Pakistani qawwali singers
