= Mubarak Ali Khan (singer) =

Pakistani classical singer (1937–2021)

Mubarak Ali Khan (1937 – 8 April 2021) was a Pakistani classical singer from the Kirana school.

== Awards ==
- 2007: Presidential Pride of Performance
