= Ghagge Nazir Khan =

Indian Hindustani classical vocalist

"Ghagge" Nazir Khan
- Born: c. 1850s Agra
- Origin: Mewat
- Died: c. 1920 Bhopal
- Genres: Indian classical music
- Occupation: Singer of hindustani classical music
- Years active: 1870s–1920s

Nazir Khan, more commonly known as "Ghagge" Nazir Khan or Jodhpurwale Nazir Khan, (c. 1850s – c. 1920s) was an Indian classical singer and, along with his elder brother Wahid Khan, founded the Mewati gharana, later popularized by Pandit Jasraj.

== Background ==
Nazir Khan was born in the 1850s to a family of Khandarbani dhrupad musicians based in Agra. His grandfather was Dada Tikkad. He was trained in singing and rudra veena by his father, Imam Khan, and uncle, Wazir Khan alongside his elder brother, Wahid.

== Career ==
Nazir Khan was appointed the court musician of Jodhpur. There he was acquainted with the family of Bade Mubarak Ali Khan of the Qawwal Bacchon tradition. He began learning from Bade Mubarak Ali Khan's brother, Waris Ali Khan (son-in-law of Haddu Khan of Gwalior Gharana), and married his daughter.

At Jodhpur, he found himself in the company of musicians like Alladiya Khan, Aliya-Fatu, and more.

After reconnecting with his brother, Wahid, in Bhopal, both relocated to the Gwalior Court where his brother's guru, Bande Ali Khan was a court musician. Having achieved a distinguished reputation, Nazir Khan continued his training with his in-laws, the family of Haddu Khan. He primarily studied with Chhote Mohammed Khan (the guru of Balkrishnabuwa Ichalkaranjikar) and may have also studied with Haddu Khan himself.

At Gwalior, Nazir Khan achieved greater recognition as a leading singer. His daughter, Hamida, married into the family of Inayat Hussain Khan of the Rampur Sahaswan Gharana, Haddu Khan's student. During this time, he served as court musician in Gwalior to the Scindia Court.

Later, he became court musician of Bhopal where he would remain until his death.

== Repertoire ==
Ramkrishnabuwa Vaze noted that Nazir Khan collected many compositions from Bade Nissar Hussain Khan. Alladiya Khan noted the lasting, extraordinary impression that Nazir Khan's rendition of Raag Ramdasi Malhar had left on him. Alladiya Khan held Nazir Khan in great esteem and claimed to have understood how to render Raag Desi properly only after hearing Nazir Khan's rendition.

== Legacy ==
Due to his proficiency in Khandarbani gayaki and baaj, Nazir Khan was regarded for his voice quality. The depth and resonance of his voice earned him the nickname "Ghagge." His singing style integrated the Gwalior gayaki and Qawwal Bacchon gayaki.

=== Disciples ===
Nazir Khan had four main disciples including his adopted son and younger brother, Munavvar, his nephew, Ghulam Qadir, and his friends, Pandit Chimanlal and Pandit Natthulal, the grandfathers of Pandit Maniram, Pandit Pratap Narayan, and Pandit Jasraj.
