= Huwa =

Arabic pronoun used in Sufism as a name of God

Hu (Arabic: هُوَ) is a pronoun to refer to God in Sufism.

== Usage ==
In Sufism Huwa is the pronoun used for Allah or God. Allah Hu means "God, Just He!" In Arabic Allah means God and with Hu, as an intensive added to Allah, means "God himself." Hu is also found in a variant of the first part of the Islamic credo, wherein lā ilāha illā Allāh "there is no god but God," is shortened to lā ilāha illā Hu(wa) meaning "There is no God but He(is)".

== Gender ==
Huwa is grammatically gendered but does not refer necessarily to a sex or gender of its referent. Some scholars even make the point that there is no meaning or symbolism assigned to biological sex in the Quran.
