= Iqbal Ahmad Khan =

Indian classical vocalist (1953–2020)

Iqbal Ahmed Khan
- Born: 25 November 1954; Delhi
- Died: 17 December 2020 (aged 66); Delhi
- Occupation: Classical vocalist
- Years active: 1966 - 2020
- Awards: Sangeet Natak Akademi Award in 2014

Ustad Iqbal Ahmed Khan (25 November 1954 – 17 December 2020) was an Indian classical vocalist from Delhi Gharana.

== Biography ==
Khan was born in 1954 into a family with a rich musical pedigree. Ustad Chand Khan (his 'Nana') and Ustad Jahan Khan (his 'Dada') were his grandfathers from the maternal and paternal sides, respectively. He was raised under the Delhi gharana of music. He began his musical performances at the age of four, guided by his grandfather and teacher, Ustad Chand Khan.

He kept up the family traditions as an active promoter of Amir Khusro's musical works. He also composed music for popular serials and plays.

In a career spanning over 50 years, Khan's performances have been noted for their versatility and his renditions have been described as "uniquely powerful and delicate". His renderings include the Thumri, Dadra, Tappa, Bhajan, and Ghazals.

He was a top grade vocal artist with Akashvani, All India Radio. He founded the Dilli Durbar, an organization aimed at promoting Indian classical music.

== Awards and recognition ==
Khan had won many honors and accolades for his contributions to Indian classical music. Some of the titles conferred on him include Gaayan Acharya (Sangeet Saiwalaya Bodh Gaya, Bihar, 1993), Sangeet Ratan (Sur Sangeet Samity, Narela, Delhi), and Sangeet Saurabh (Sangeetayan, Delhi, 1998).

Some of his other awards included:

- Awarded International Amir Khusro Gold medal, 1966
- Honoured as "Youngest Vocalist of the Country" by Andhra Pradesh government, 1970.
- Given the title "Best Classical Singer of the Stage" by Shobana Arts of Delhi, 1974.
- During his Bachelor of Arts at Delhi University, received trophies, gold medals, shields and certificates including the "Amir Khan Trophy" & Mirza Ghalib Trophy (1976 - 77 university Youth Festival) and was declared the "Outstanding Vocalist" of the university.
- "Best Music Director Composer" award for his play "Roop Bengal" staged at Jamia Millia Islamia University, Delhi, and popular T.V. Serial "Amir Khusro".
- Participated in the international symposium of "The life and works of "Amir Khusro" and gave lecture-cum-demonstration in 1982.
- Participated in International Persian Conference held in Delhi & Bombay and rendered Persian Ghazals of poets Hafiz, Sadi, Jami and Amir Khusro.
- Received "Priyadarshini Award" 2001 and "Rajiv Rattan Sadbhavna Samman" 2003.
- Received Sr. Fellowship from Ministry of HRD, Tourism and Culture, Govt. of India, for the year 2002.
- Recipient of Sangeet Natak Academy Award in the year 2014.

== Compositions ==
- Music for various popular serials e.g. Indra Sabha, Chader ka Tukra, Basant Bahar, Kala Vasana, Police File Se, Safar ek Ishq ka, etc. In National Network and a documentary "Qutab Minar & its Monuments & Sculptures." Was also awarded the Best Music Director in the year 1988 and composed Music for Tele Films Aik Pal Aur, Yaad-e-Ghalib. The LittleToy, Jung Abhi Jaari Hai, Talash and Rudra-avatar, for National hook up.
- Music for the plays "Tamasha Aur Tamashai", "Darashikoh", "Jahan-e-Khusro".
- Two of his CDs have been released in Paris.

== Death ==
Iqbal Ahmad Khan died on 17 December 2020 at age 66. He suffered a cardiac arrest during morning prayers and suddenly collapsed. He was immediately brought to a hospital in Daryaganj, Delhi. He was declared dead on arrival.
