= Ajrara =

Coordinates: 28°50′N 77°49′E

Ajrara is a village situated in the Kharkhoda Mandal of Meerut District in Uttar Pradesh, India. It is located 7.5 kilometres from its Mandal headquarters at Kharkhoda, and 20 kilometres from the district headquarters in Meerut. The population of Ajrara, according to the 2001 Census of India, was 11,513, and it is mainly a Muslim village, with Muslim Tyagis forming an important element.

Villages nearby include Badholi (2.2 km), Ataula (2.7 km), Atrara (2.8 km), Jasori (3.2 km), Kharkhari (3.2 km), Kaul (3.2 km), and Mundali (3.7 km)

The Ajrara style of tabla playing gets its name from the village. It is thought to be an offshoot of the Delhi gharana because its founders, brothers Kallo Khan and Miroo Khan, had spent a considerable amount of time in Delhi learning from some of the great Ustads of the time, before returning to their native Ajrara.
