= Wahid Khan (beenkar) =

Indian Hindustani classical vocalist

- Born: c. 1840s Agra
- Died: 11 January 1933; Indore
- Occupation: Instrumentalist of Hindustani Classical music
- Years active: 1860s – 1933
- Notable credit: Mewati gharana of Hindustani classical music

Abdul Wahid Khan, more commonly known as Wahid Khan Beenkar or Indorewale Wahid Khan, (c. 1840s – 1933) was an Indian classical rudra veena player and, along with his younger brother Ghagge Nazir Khan, founded the Mewati gharana, later popularized by Pandit Jasraj and Rais Khan.

== Background ==
Abdul Wahid Khan was born in the 1840s to a family of Khandarbani dhrupad musicians based in Agra. His grandfather was Dada Tikkad. He was trained in singing and rudra veena by his father, Imam Khan, and uncle, Wazir Khan, alongside his younger brother, Ghagge Nazir Khan.

Abdul Wahid Khan continued his training with Bande Ali Khan and became one of only two of his anointed disciples. Consequently, Wahid Khan is often affiliated with Bande Ali Khan's traditions, Kirana and Dagarbani, but forged his own path through the Mewati gharana, grounded in the earlier Khandarbani tradition.

== Career ==
Abdul Wahid Khan was appointed the court musician of Indore, serving under Shivajirao Holkar and Tukojirao Holkar III, succeeding his guru, Bande Ali Khan who previously held the post.

He would remain in Indore until his death on 11th January 1933. His son, Latif Khan succeeded as court musician of Indore afterwards.

== Legacy ==
Abdul Wahid Khan was considered one of the finest rudra veena players and teachers of his time.

=== Disciples ===
Abdul Wahid Khan had six children, four of whom went on to be musicians. This includes Latif Khan , Abdul Majid Khan, Ghulam Qadir Khan, and Abdul Hameed Khan. His oldest two sons, Latif and Majid, married into the family of Imdad Khan. His great-grandson was Rais Khan, through his daughter, Begum Hasiban Bai, the mother of Mohammed Khan.
