= Abu Muhammad Qawwal =

Pakistani sufi devotional singer

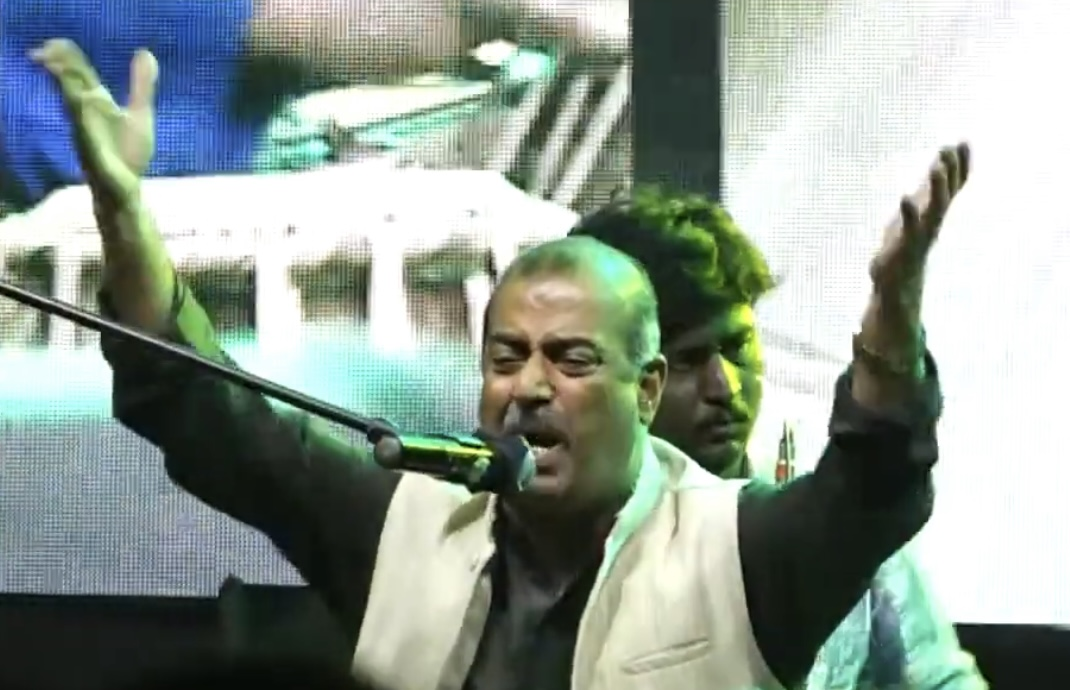
- Born: Abu Muhammad; September 13, 1960 (age 66); Karachi, Pakistan
- Occupation: Musician
- Known for: Qawwali; Sufi music; Ghazal; Hindustani classical music
- Father: Munshi Raziuddin
- Relatives: Fareed Ayaz (brother)
- Awards: Pride of Performance (2020)

Abu Muhammad Qawwal (born 13 September 1960) is a Pakistani Sufi and Hindustani classical musician, primarily focusing on Qawwali. He belongs to the Qawwal Bachchon ka Gharana of Delhi. He is a brother of fellow Qawwal Fareed Ayaz, who is the other half of the duo known as Fareed Ayaz-Abu Muhammad Qawwal.

== Life and family ==
Abu Muhammad was born on 13 September 1960 in Karachi to Munshi Raziuddin. He has an elder brother Fareed Ayaz, the duo together being known as Farid Ayaz Abu Muhammad Qawwal. They both were trained in Qawwali by their father.

They belong to the Qawwal Bacchon ka Gharana (Dilli Gharana), their ancestor, Mian Samat Bin Ibrahim was a disciple of Amir Khusrau, the inventor of Qawwali.

Muhammad, his brother Farid and their father Raziuddin all received Pride of Performance, the highest literary award of Pakistan.

Muhammad did his schooling at the Grand Folks School in Karachi and graduated from Islamia College, University of Karachi.

== Career ==
He along with his brother Fareed Ayaz has performed worldwide including Lahore Literary Festival (LLF) in New York City and Concordia University in Montreal.

== Awards ==
- Pride of Performance Award by the President of Pakistan in 2020.
