= Abdullah Niazi Qawwal =

Pakistani Qawwal (born 1960)

Abdullah Manzoor Niazi Qawwal

Background information
- Born: 1960 (age 65–66); Karachi, Pakistan
- Origin: Pakistan
- Genres: Qawwal
- Instrument: Harmonium
- Website: Abdullah Niazi Waqas Niazi Qawwal & Brothers

Abdullah Niazi Qawwal (born 1960) (Urdu: عبداللہ نیازی قوال) is a Pakistani Qawwal. He belongs to the Qawwal Bachchon Ka Gharana of Delhi. He is the eldest son of Manzoor Niazi Qawwal (no relation to the Pashtun Niazi tribe).

== Historical background ==
Abdullah Niazi was one of the principal Qawwals in Manzoor Niazi Qawwal's group and after the death of Manzoor Niazi Qawwal, he led a Qawwali group formed with his brothers. In 2015, he branched out with his sons supporting him. His performance style is steeped in Amir Khusro's Kalaam (verses) and based on Indian classical music. Abdullah Niazi carries the qawwali performance with a command and virtuosity rarely found in contemporary Qawwals capturing Amir Khusrow's poetry and its musical emotionality in all its subtlety and intensity. Abdullah Niazi Qawwal performs various genres of qawwali music such as Thumri, Khayal, Tarana, Sufism, and Classical. This was all evident in their concert performance at the National Academy of Performing Arts arranged by the All Pakistan Music Conference.

Abdullah Niazi Qawwal is a descendant of Mir Qutub Bakhsh, who was awarded the title of Tanras Khan by the last Mughal Emperor Bahadur Shah Zafar. Tanras Khan was also the tutor in music and court musician of the Mughal emperor Bahadur Shah Zafar.

== Early life and career ==
Abdullah Niazi Qawwal learned Qawwali from his late father Manzoor Niazi Qawwal and his late uncle Bahauddin Qawwal.

Abdullah Niazi with his three sons Waqas Ahmed, Saad Ahmed, and Fahad Ahmed are now promoting their family's traditional music. They have performed in South Africa, United States, Canada, Norway, Denmark, Sweden, Dubai, Abu Dhabi, Muscat, India, Bangladesh, Saudi Arabia, Sri Lanka and many other countries.

== TV Channels & Recordings ==
Abdullah Niazi Qawwal has released many CDs/VCDs and Audio Cassettes. He also has recorded qawwalis on ARY Qtv channel and on Pakistan Television Corporation channel. He has recorded qawwalis on South Africa's Radio Lotus in 1989, Oslo Television in 1991, and on Door Darshan of India. Abdullah Niazi Qawwal also worked with Komal Rizvi in her video song Jhoolay Lal which was released by Saregama in 2013.

== Awards ==
Abdullah Niazi Qawwal are popular for their performances and they also have received many awards.

Awards
Association	Date of ceremony	Category	Recipients and nominees	Result	Ref.
International Mystic Music Sufi Festival	2007	Best Performance	Won		
ARY QTV Awards	2010	Popular Qawwal	Won		
