= Badar Miandad =

Pakistani qawwali singer (1960-2007)

Badar Miandad Khan
- بدر میانداد خان
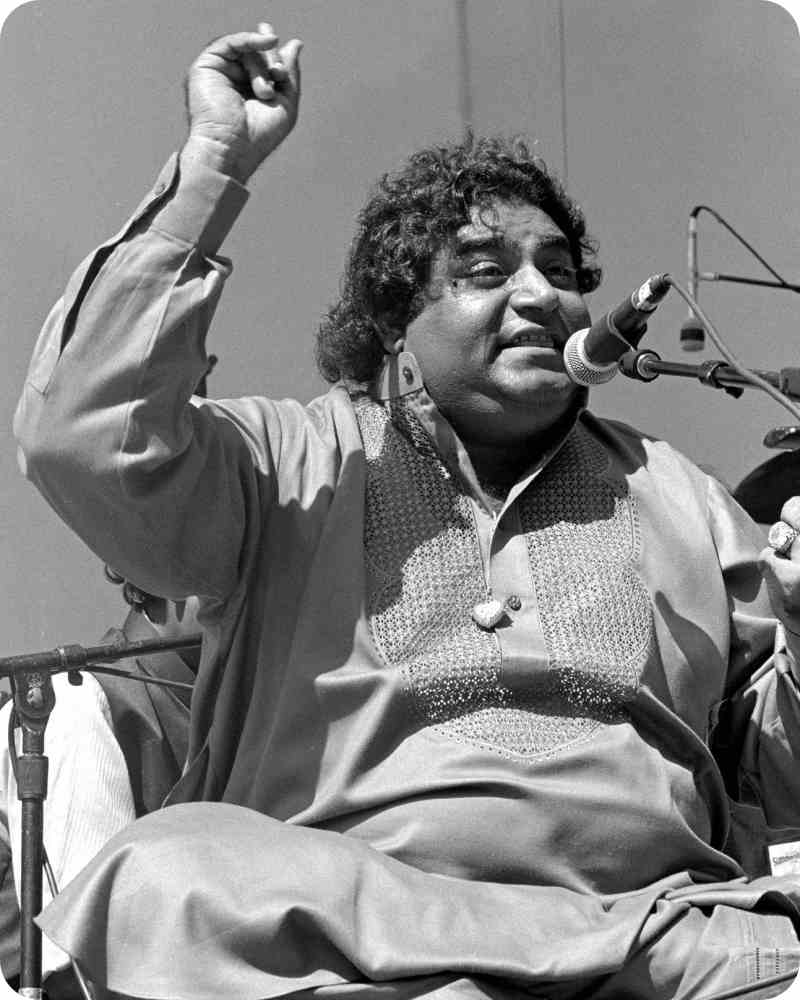
- Badar Miandad Qawwal
- Born: Badar Ali Khan; 17 February 1960; Pakpattan, Lahore, Pakistan
- Died: 2 March 2007 (aged 47); Lahore, Pakistan
- Other name: Badar Miandad Khan
- Occupation: Qawwali singer
- Years active: 1974 – 2005
- Relatives: Sher Miandad Khan (brother); Nusrat Fateh Ali Khan (cousin)

Badar Miandad Khan (17 February 1962 – 2 March 2007), also known as Badar Ali Khan, was a Pakistani qawwali singer. He released numerous albums in Pakistan as well as several released under UK and Indian labels.

== Early life and career ==
Ustad Badar Miandad was born on 17 February 1962 into a noted family of qawwals in Pak Pattan. His father Ustad Rasheed Miandad and grandfather Ustad Din Muhammad Qawwal were reputed qawwals in Punjabi language. He was a cousin and brother-in-law of the late Ustad Nusrat Fateh Ali Khan.

Badar Miandad started his qawwali career in 1975, and by the mid 1980s, he had become one of the famous qawwals of Pakistan. He composed the music for Bollywood films, including Virod, starring Salman Khan. He also composed the music for several Pakistani films, including Chupkay Chupkay, Lahoria, Ibrat, But Shikan (1994 film) and Jannat Ki Talash (1999 film) which won the Nigar Award for Best Film of 1999.

== Family ==
Badar Miandad got married in 1985. Badar Miandad has two daughters, Fiza Badar and Anam Badar, and three sons, Sikandar Badar Miandad, Ali Badar Miandad, and Shahzaib Badar Miandad. Sikandar Badar Miandad is a popular singer. Sikandar Badar Miandad has released numerous singles and music videos and has appeared on various television shows and radio programs. Ali Bandar Miandad is a musician of qawwali as well lighter music as well.

== Popular qawwalis ==
- Awwal Hamd Sana-e-Ilahi Jo Maalik Har Har Da – Kalaam lyrics by the famous 19th century Sufi poet Mian Muhammad Bakhsh (1830–1907)
- Aimay Panj Wailay Marnan Ae Pheray, Maseeton Teinun Ki Labhna – Kalaam lyrics by another 18th century Sufi poet Bulleh Shah
- Dam Dam Hussain Maula Hussain
- Jashan-e-Aamad-e-Rasool
- Tu Nahi Tay Tairiyan Yaadan Sahi
- Ganj Shakar, Walian Da Raja
- Husan Walo Khuda Kay Liy Chordo, Aashiquon Ko Jalana Boorri Baat Hai
- Ban Ja Malang Ghaus Da

Like his famous cousin, Ustad Nusrat Fateh Ali Khan, Badar Miandad Khan experimented with qawwali remix projects, in which traditional qawwali lyrics were performed to non-traditional instruments and contemporary beats. He Working with producer/arranger/composer Suresh "Baba" Varma, Badar produced a best-selling qawwali fusion album, Good Karma 1.

Khan's Qawwali "Raataan Kaaliyaan / Black Nights" was featured on famous American TV show Breaking Bad's Season 3 Episode 7.

== Death ==
Badar Miandad died on 2 March 2007 at age 47 in Lahore due to a heart attack after two years of cardiac trouble, complications from diabetes and blood pressure problems. A few months ago, he was also struck by paralysis. He had been bed-ridden for the last two years and had quit singing qawwali one year ago.

His younger brother Sher Miandad who also is a well-known qawwali singer told newspaper reporters, after his death, that he had suffered a heart attack five years ago and then suffered another fatal heart attack again on 2 March 2007, when he died.
