= Faiyaz Khan (tabla player) =

Tabla player from India (1934 - 2014)

Ustad Faiyaz Khan (tabla player)
- Born: 1934; Sikar, Rajasthan, India
- Origin: India
- Died: 12 November 2014 (aged 79–80)
- Genres: Instrumentalist, Hindustani music, tabla players
- Occupation: Indian Classical Percussionist
- Instruments: Tabla, Mridangam

Ustad Faiyaz Khan (1934 – 12 November 2014) was a tabla player of international repute.

== Biography ==
Faiyaz Khan was born in 1934 in Sikar, Rajasthan, into a family of musicians. Nazir Khan, his father, was a sarangi and tabla player at the court of the Maharaja of Karauli. His elder brother, Munir Khan, was a well-known sarangi player. He was first taught sarangi and vocal music. His initial Tabla training was under Ustad Hidayat Khan. He also learned from the late Ustad Inam Ali Khan of the Delhi gharana of Tabla. Ustad Faiyaz Khan also studied south Indian rhythms from a master of the barrel drum mridangam, Ramnad Ishwaran.

He began his career as a staff artist of All India Radio, Jaipur in 1955. In 1958, he moved to Delhi to join All India Radio there. He retired from regular radio service in 1993.

Ustad Faiyaz Khan regularly accompanied many great stalwarts and frequently performed as a soloist as well. He also travelled the world extensively, from giving performances at the festival of Shiraz, Iran to a solo recital at Queen Elizabeth Hall in London in 1971, and numerous performances in Australia, the United States and Europe.

Faiyaz Khan had the opportunity of accompanying three generations of musicians: from the masters of yesteryear, such as Bade Ghulam Ali Khan, Amir Khan, Hafiz Ali Khan, Begum Akhtar, Gangubai Hangal, Pannalal Ghosh, Siddheshwari Devi, Mallikarjun Mansur, Abdul Rashid Khan, the generation of artists like Pandit Ravi Shankar, Ali Akbar Khan, Nikhil Banerjee, Kishori Amonkar, Vilayat Khan, Sharan Rani, Parween Sultana, Amjad Ali Khan, Hariprasad Chaurasia, Debu Chaudhuri, Bhimsen Joshi, Pandit Jasraj, Pandit Shivkumar Sharma, Rajshekhar Mansur, Ajoy Chakraborty etc., to younger artists much his junior in age.

He taught for a year in 1985 at the Washington University in St. Louis and, from 1992, taught at the Rotterdam Conservatory regularly. Further regular teaching for a period of 20 years after his retirement took place at Gandharva Mahavidyalaya Delhi, India. His disciples are his son, Rais Khan, his grandsons – and Gyan Singh, Shahbaz Hussain (UK), Udit Pankhania (UK), Heiko Dijker and Ted De Jong (Holland).

== Death and legacy ==
He died on 12 November 2014 in New Delhi, at the age of 80 due to meningitis. Among his survivors were two sons and five daughters.

== Awards and recognition ==
- Taal Samrat Award by the Ustad Ashique Ali Khan memorial society in 2010
