= Ajrara gharana =

Traditional school in tabla drum

Coordinates: 28°50′17.03″N 77°49′7.57″E

Ajrara gharana, or Ajrada gharana, is one of the six main traditional schools in tabla drum. Gharana use complex Bols and Meend. Pakhawaj bols are rare. The stress is on Ad and Barabar laya. It specializes in the three-time pattern. The position of the left drum is not changed, but its face is touched with the thumb.

== History ==
This school was founded in the late 18th - early 19th century by Miru Khan and Kallu Khan, disciples of Ustad Sitaab Khan of the Delhi gharana, in Ajrara, Meerut, Uttar Pradesh. A notable representative of gharana has been Ustad Habibuddin Khan. Ustad Manju Khan Sahib, son and student of Ustad Habibuddin Khan Sahib. Currently, several disciples of Ustad Manju Khan Sahib are actively carrying forward the rich legacy of the Ajrada Gharana. Among the most notable are Pandit Dr. Anil Kumar Sharma from Ludhiana, Athar Khan and Parvez Khan from Delhi who have been devoted disciples of Ustad Manju Khan Saheb for over 30 years.

Other prominent representatives of the gharana include Fardeen, based in Delhi, and torch bearer Ustad Akram Khan, also based in Delhi who continue to uphold and promote the distinctive style and tradition of the Ajrada Gharana through their performances and teaching.

== Playing style ==
The Ajrara gharana style includes more complicated bol patterns than the Delhi gharana. This is because it also uses the third finger. Bols like Dhina GiNa, Ghe Ghe Tit Kit, Dha Ge Na, etc. are most frequently used. These bols create a certain resonance. Pakhawaj bols are rarely used in this gharana.

Gheginak, gheghe, Dhadagena, Nadagena, Tadagena, etc. are used in the kayadas.

Ajrada is known for its bayan (bass drum) work. The kayadas of Ajrada often have an additional third line out of four.
