= Manzoor Niazi Qawwal =

- Born: Manzoor Ahmed Khan Niazi; 1922; Delhi, British India
- Died: 9 April 2013 (age 91); Karachi, Sindh, Pakistan
- Other name: Bulbul E Deccan
- Occupation: Qawwali singer
- Years active: 1937–2012
- Known for: Qawwali
- Family: Munshi Raziuddin (cousin); Qawwal Bahauddin Khan (Cousin)
- Honours: Tamgha-e-Imtiaz (2006)

Manzoor Ahmed Khan Niazi (1922 – 9 April 2013) was a renowned Pakistani Qawwal and a classical musician in India and Pakistan. He belonged to the well-known family of Qawwals, Qawwal Bacchon ka Gharana of Delhi.

== Career ==
Manzoor Niazi Qawwal was a senior Qawwal in the Indian subcontinent, and had one of the most instantly recognizable voices among the qawwals. He was the leader of the gifted, albeit short-lived Qawwali group of the last century, a Qawwali Supergroup which Included his cousins Munshi Raziuddin Qawwal and Bahauddin Qawwal. Formed as the Manzoor Ahmed Khan Niazi Qawwal & Brothers qawwali group in 1937.

Quiad-e-Azam Muhammad Ali Jinnah gave him the title of Bulbul-e-Deccan. This ensemble lasted until 1966. After 1966, Manzoor Ahmed Khan Niazi turned to solo work and trained his sons Abdullah Manzoor Niazi and Masroor Ahmed Niazi. He also trained his cousin Munshi Raziuddin's Sons Farid Ayaz And Abu Muhammad, and his cousin Bahauddin Qawwal's sons Qawwal Najmuddin – Saifuddin & Brothers. He helped his own sons form their own ensemble. Manzoor Niazi occasionally assisted his sons during their concerts as the group's leader. His grandson Habib Niazi, who is the son of Masroor Niazi, later became the second lead Singer in his son Abdullah Niazi's group.

Manzoor Niazi Qawwal died on 9 April 2013 at age 91 at Karachi, Pakistan.

== Awards and legacy ==
- For His Sheer Devotion And Contribution For Sufi Music, Manzoor Ahmed Niazi was honored with a Tamgha-e-Imtiaz Award (Medal of Excellence) Award by the President of Pakistan in 2006.
