= Munshi Raziuddin =

Pakistani performer of Qawwali music (1912-2003)

PP Munshi Raziuddin Ahmed Khan Pride of Performance
- Born: 1912; Delhi, British India
- Died: 2003 (aged 90–91); Karachi, Sindh, Pakistan
- Other name: 'Munsh-ji'
- Occupations: Qawwal musician of Qawwali
- Known for: Delhi gharana of Qawwali musicians
- Children: Fareed Ayaz; Abu Muhammad Qawwal; [Ali Akbar]; [Akram]
- Awards: Pride of Performance Award by the President of Pakistan in 1967

Munshi Raziuddin Ahmed Khan (1912 – 2003) was a Pakistani Qawwali singer, classical musician and researcher and scholar of music. He belonged to the well-known Qawwal Bachchon Ka Gharana of Delhi.

== Career ==
Initially, he performed in the court of the Nizam of Hyderabad, in British India with his cousin Qawwal Bahauddin Khan. However, after the fall of Hyderabad in 1948 to India, he moved to Karachi, Pakistan. In 1956, he formed a qawwali group along with his cousins, Bahauddin Qawwal and Manzoor Ahmed Niazi. This ensemble or group lasted until 1966.

After 1966, Munshi Raziuddin turned to solo work, forming his own Qawwali party, and was a successful qawwal until his death in 2003. Traditional Qawwali singing heritage of the city of Karachi can still be felt and seen in a small neighborhood in Karachi named Qawwali Gali (Qawwali Street) in the Saddar Town area of Karachi city, where a street is named after Munshi Raziuddin Qawwal.

He trained his sons Farid Ayaz & Abu Muhammad, Ghulam Akram and Ali Akbar. He also trained his nephews Qawwal Najmuddin - Saifuddin & Brothers (sons of Bahauddin Qawwal), and his other nephews Abdullah Manzoor Niazi & Masroor Ahmed Niazi (sons of Manzoor Niazi) and his son-in-law, Naseeruddin Saami.

Munshi Raziuddin was succeeded by his sons, Fareed Ayaz and Abu Muhammad, who perform as Fareed Ayaz Qawwal in 2022. His other sons are Ali Akber Razi who performs as Ali Akbar Qawwal.

== Awards and recognition ==
- For his contribution and devotion to Sufi music, he was awarded with the Pride of Performance Award in 1967 by the President of Pakistan.
