= Rahat Fateh Ali Khan =

Pakistani musician (born 1974)

Ustad Rahat Fateh Ali Khan PP
- راحت فتح علی خان
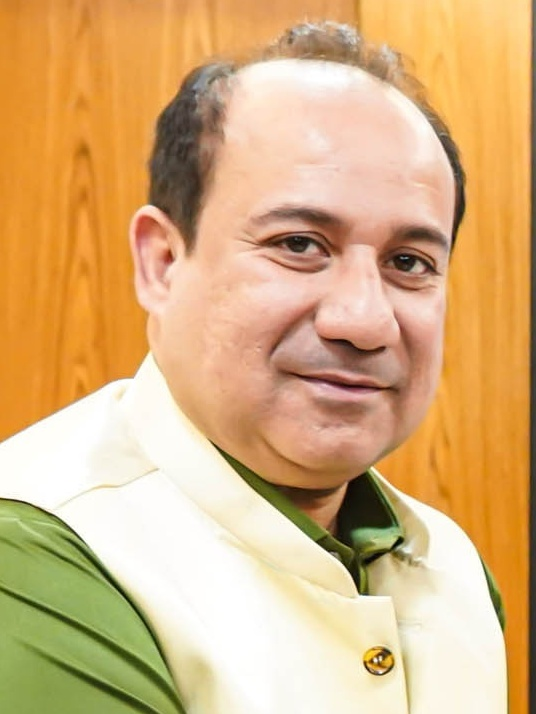
- Khan during his tour in Bangladesh in 2024
- Born: Rahat Fateh Ali Khan; 9 December 1974 (age 51); Lyallpur, Punjab, Pakistan
- Occupations: Singer; musician
- Years active: 1997–present
- Works: Full list
- Children: Filza; Maheen; Shahzaman
- Father: Farrukh Fateh Ali Khan
- Relatives: Nusrat Fateh Ali Khan (uncle); Fateh Ali Khan (grandfather); Mubarak Ali Khan (great-uncle)
- Awards: Full list
- Musical career
- Genres: Qawwali; ghazal; Sufi; filmi; classical
- Instruments: Vocals; harmonium
- Years active: 1997–present
- Labels: T-Series; Sony Music; Universal Music; YRF Music; Coke Studio

Rahat Fateh Ali Khan (Punjabi: راحت فتح علی خان, Punjabi pronunciation: [ɾɑːɦət̪ fəte(ɦ) əliː xɑːn]; born 9 December 1974) is a Pakistani Punjabi singer, primarily of Qawwali, a form of Sufi devotional music. Khan is one of the most popular and highest paid singers in Pakistan. He is the nephew of Nusrat Fateh Ali Khan, the son of Farrukh Fateh Ali Khan and the grandson of Qawwali singer Fateh Ali Khan. In addition to Qawwali, he also performs ghazals and other light music. He is also well-known as a playback singer in the Hindi cinema and Pakistan film industry.

== Early life ==
Rahat was born into a Punjabi family of Qawwals and classical singers in Faisalabad, Punjab, Pakistan. He is the son of Farrukh Fateh Ali Khan, grandson of Fateh Ali Khan and nephew of Qawwali singer Nusrat Fateh Ali Khan.

Rahat displayed an adoration for music from a very young age and was often found to be singing with his uncle and father, as young as three. From an age of seven, he was already being trained by his uncle Nusrat Fateh Ali Khan in the art of singing Qawwali.

== Career ==
Rahat performed publicly for the first time in 1979, on the death anniversary of his grandfather. Since he was fifteen, he was an integral part of Nusrat Fateh Ali Khan's well-known qawwali group and toured the United Kingdom with his uncle in 1985. He also performed solo songs at different concerts, in addition to fulfilling his roles in the Qawwali group. He made his Bollywood playback singing debut with the song "Mann Ki Lagan" from the movie Paap (2003), a composition by Nusrat Fateh Ali Khan that was originally recorded in Pakistan for an unreleased album.

In 2011, after his release from a high-profile Customs case in India, Rahat was touring the US where one of his promoters, Chitresh Srivastava, died in a car crash. In April 2012, Rahat toured in the UK, performing at Wembley Arena and the Manchester Arena, playing to a combined audience of over 20,000 people and creating a record of maximum ticket-sales.

The song "Zaroori Tha" from the album Back 2 Love (2014) became the first original non-film music video from the Indian subcontinent to cross 100 million views on YouTube after two years, and 200 million views within three years of its release. Eventually it reached a billion views. He is also touring with Leo Twins from Nescafé Basement regularly.

In 2018, the daughter of Nusrat Fateh Ali Khan said she intended to take legal action against copyright infringement of singers who sing her father's songs. To this, Rahat responded saying he was the adopted successor of Nusrat and that he doesn't need anyone's permission to sing his songs.

=== Soundtracks and collaboration ===
In a subordinate role with his uncle Nusrat Fateh Ali Khan, working in collaboration with Eddie Vedder, of the American rock band, Pearl Jam, Rahat contributed to the soundtrack of the 1995 Hollywood film, Dead Man Walking. In 2002, he worked on the soundtrack of The Four Feathers in collaboration with the American composer of orchestral and film music, James Horner. In 2002, Rahat guested with The Derek Trucks Band on the song "Maki Madni" for Trucks' album, Joyful Noise. In 2006, his vocals were featured on the soundtrack of Mel Gibson's Apocalypto. In 2008, he sang the song "Teri Ore" for the movie Singh Is Kinng alongside Shreya Ghoshal.

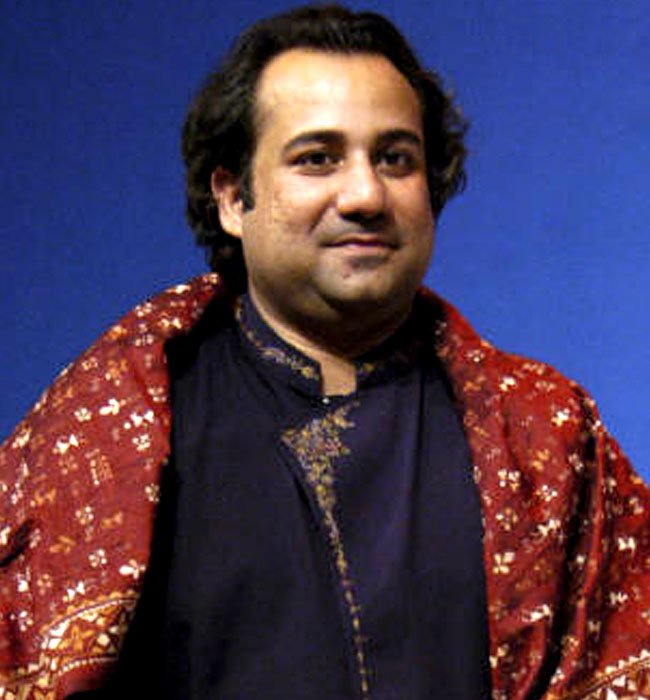
Khan in 2013

=== Television ===
He judged the show Chhote Ustaad alongside Sonu Nigam. He was also one of the judges on the singing reality show Junoon, which premiered on NDTV Imagine in 2008.

=== Nobel Peace Prize Concert ===
Rahat became the first Pakistani to perform at any Nobel Prize concert, when he was invited to the concert at 2014 Nobel Peace Prize ceremony. He performed Nusrat Fateh Ali Khan's most memorable qawwali "Tumhe Dillagi" and "Mast Qalandar", and he also sang "Aao Parhao" there.

=== Musical shows ===
==== Coke Studio ====
Rahat has appeared in five editions of the Pakistani musical show Coke Studio.

He first appeared in season 1, where he collaborated with singer Ali Azmat for the track "Garaj Baras". He then collaborated with Abida Parveen in season 7 for "Chhaap Tilak Sab Chheeni".

In season 9, he sang "Afreen Afreen" along with Momina Mustehsan which has garnered more than 300 million views on YouTube, becoming the first Pakistani song to cross that mark. He collaborated with Amjad Sabri for "Aaj Rang Hai", which was the final performance of the latter, prior to his assassination on 22 June 2016.

He appeared in Coke Studio Pakistan (season 10) where he performed "Sayonee" with Ali Noor and a solo number called Rangreza. Rahat's latest appearance in Coke Studio was in Coke Studio 2020 where he performed "Dil Tarpe" featuring Zara Madani.

==== MTV Unplugged ====
Rahat had appeared in MTV Unplugged (India) in 2016.

== Personal life ==
Within his household, Rahat is affectionately known as 'Tipu'. Rahat had a father-son like relationship with his uncle, Nusrat Fateh Ali Khan. Rahat accompanied his uncle on his tours since age 5, and was selected by him to lead the touring party after his demise. In 2001, Rahat married Nida with whom he has 2 daughters, Maheen and Filza, and a son, Shahzaman, who is a Qawwali singer. Rahat was very close to his mother, who died in 2005, as he could not afford money for her treatment. His career however took off after her death. Rahat later admitted in interviews that India had been "kinder" to him.

In 2011, Rahat and his entourage were held by the Indian Customs for undeclared goods. In 2013, Rahat himself penned his first song Sab Jhoote (lit. 'It is all lies') after being "fed up" with his own management and the music industry. In 2018, Rahat was at the center of a public rift among the members of the Fateh Ali Khan family regarding song rights. In 2024, after ousting his long time manager and promoter Salman Ahmed, Rahat appointed his in-laws. The same year, Rahat was embroiled in another controversy after appearing to assault one of his house help, for which he later publicly apologized.

== See also ==
- Dildar Hussain
- List of Pakistani musicians
