= Sher Miandad Khan =

Pakistani qawwal and folk singer

- شیر میانداد خان
- Born: Sher Miandad; 1968 (age 57–58); Pakpattan, Pakistan
- Other name: Cukoo
- Occupations: Qawwali, Punjabi folk music
- Years active: 1996 – present
- Relatives: Badar Miandad (brother); Nusrat Fateh Ali Khan (cousin)
- Awards: Pride of Performance Award by the President of Pakistan in 2023

Sher Miandad Khan (Urdu: شیر میانداد خان) (born 1968), is a Pakistani qawwal and Punjabi folk singer.

== Early life ==
He was born in Pakpattan in 1968, started singing at the age 12, gave his first public performance at 15 and started his solo qawwali group in 1996. He adopted qawwali singing, which is part of his family's heritage. He belongs to Qawwal Bacchon gharana (School of Music). His grandfather Din Mohammad Qawwal (Dina Qawwal) was a renowned qawwal of India and Pakistan. He learned music from his father Ustad Miandad Khan.

He is a cousin of renowned qawwal Nusrat Fateh Ali Khan. Sher Miandad is the younger brother of another popular Pakistani qawwal Badar Miandad also known as Badar Ali Khan Qawwal.

== Career ==
As of 2014, he had released nearly 100 qawwali albums. He has given his qawwali performances of sufiana kalam at many international music fairs and shows including in the United States, Switzerland, India and Singapore. Sher Miandad and his qawwali group has also performed for Pakistan Television and Radio Pakistan. His qawwali group has performed in Geneva, Switzerland and Oslo, Norway and has also won some international music awards. Sher Miandad has a keen following in Europe, America and India.

After a live concert in 2016, Sher Miandad is quoted as saying:

"Sufi music can act as a balm to heal the wounds, which our society is suffering from at the moment as a result of extremism and sectarianism".

== Naats ==
Some of his Naats are:

- Tu Kuja Man Kuja

== Qawwalis ==
Some of his Qawalis are:

- Tajdar-e-Haram
- Tum Aik Gorakh Dhanda Ho
- Nach Malanga
- Baba dey darbar chirryan boldiyan
- Assan Tey Fareed Naal Dil Laliya
- Jugni (Sakhi Lal Di Jugni)
- Yad bhuldi nai teri
- Tumhein dillagi bhulani pare gi
- Qalandri Gharha
- Raaz diyan gallan
- Kabootar Daata De
- Waqia Karbala
- Meray Allah Meinu Maaf Kar Dey

== Awards and recognition ==
- Pride of Performance Award by the President of Pakistan in 2023.
