= Naseeruddin Saami =

Singer of Pakistani classical music

Ustad Naseeruddin Saami
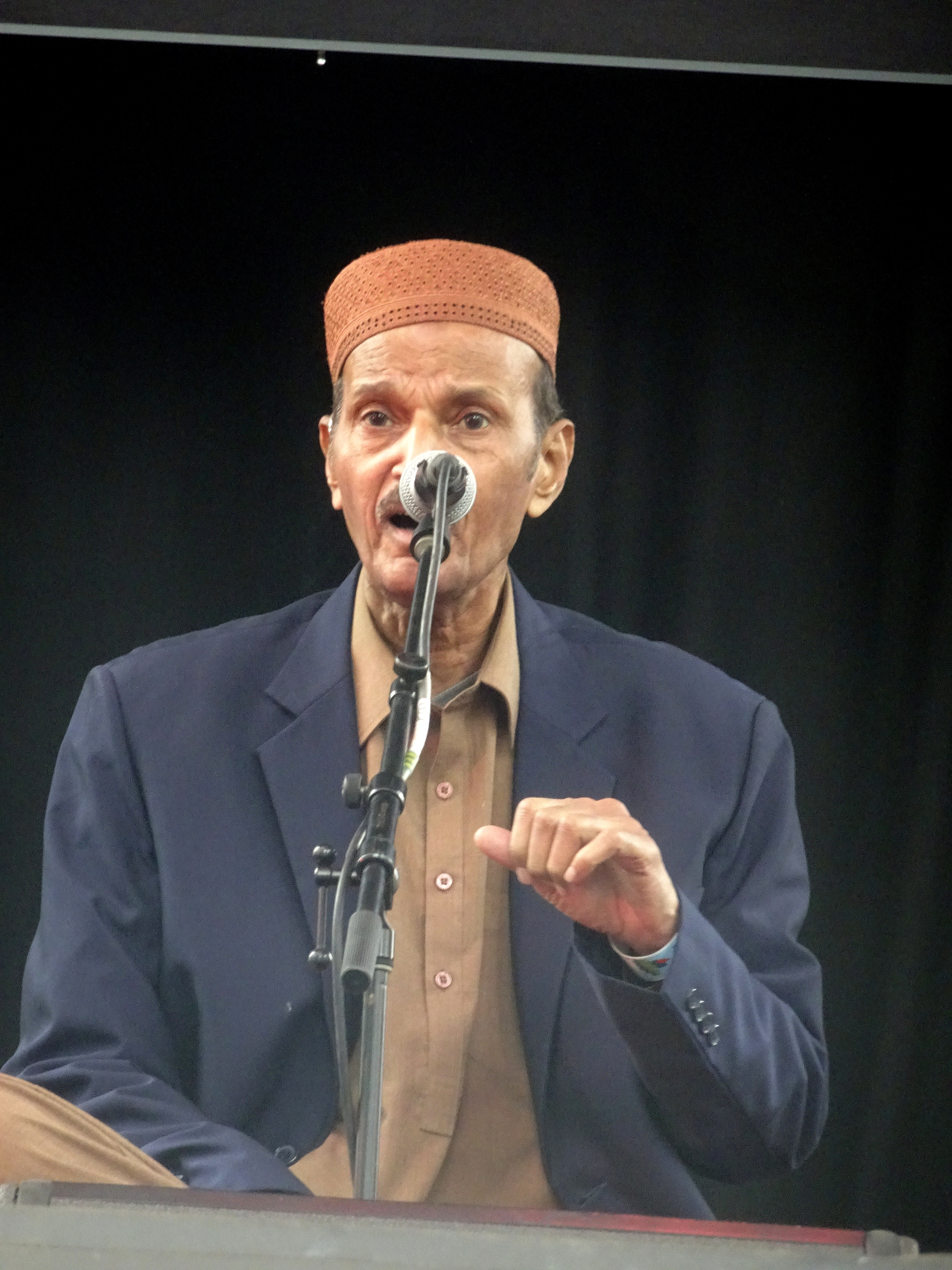
- Born: Nasiruddin Mahmoud; 1/1/1946; Delhi, India
- Known for: Known for: Khayal singing, Microtonal mastery
- Notable work: God is not a terrorist, Ustad Saami (Glitterbeat Records, January 2019); Pakistan is for the peaceful, Ustad Saami (Glitterbeat, October 2020); East Pakistan Sky, Ustad Saami (Glitterbeat Records, October 2021)
- Style: Qawwal Bacha Gharana [Delhi Gharana, Tanrus Khan Sahab]
- Spouse: Mah Laqa Shahana Begum
- Children: Rauf Saami, Urooj Saami, Azeem Saami, Ahmed Ghani Saami
- Awards: Pride of Performance Award by the President of Pakistan in 2013; Tamgha-i-Imtiaz (Medal of Excellence) Award by the Government of Pakistan in 2007; Lifetime Achievement Award, All Pakistan Music Conference; Lifetime Achievement Award, Lahore Literary Festival; Songlines Music Award 2022 - Asia & Pacific

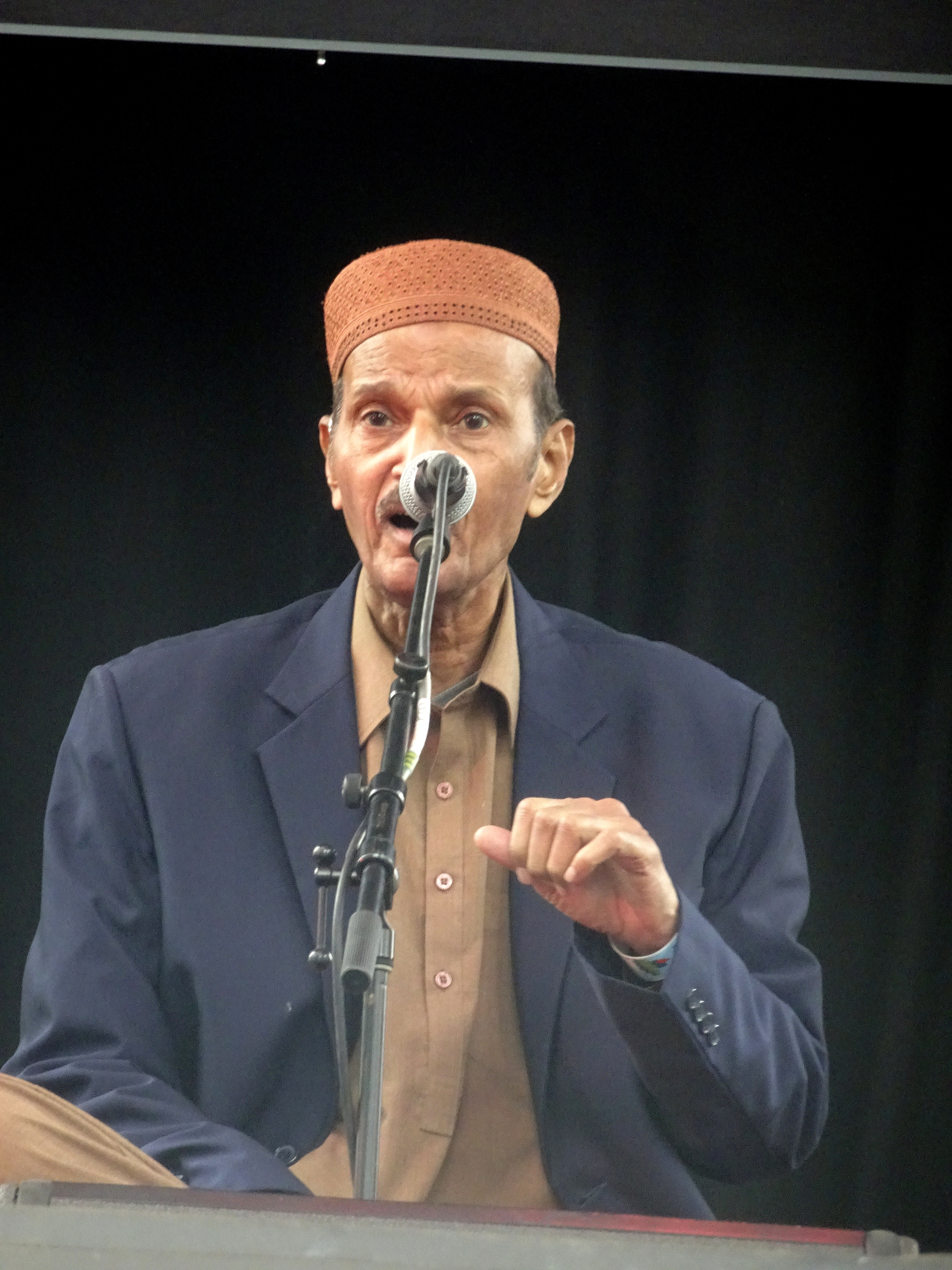
Ustad Saami at WOMADelaide, Australia, March 9, 2020.

Ustad Naseeruddin Saami (born 1946) is a classical singer from Pakistan.

He is called ustad for his mastery of subcontinental classical music. Ustad Saami is one of the world’s most revered living masters of Khayal, the oldest form of classical South Asian singing, rooted in the Delhi Gharana musical tradition founded by his ancestors. His lineage traces back to Miyan Samath, a disciple of Hazrat Ameer Khusro, and his family’s musical heritage has been closely tied to the spiritual court of Hazrat Nizamuddin Auliya for centuries.

He is best known for his Khyal style of singing and is the only living practitioner of the complex 49-microtonal Surti scale. Through oral tradition, he has transmitted this rare knowledge to his four sons—Muhammad Rauf, Muhammad Urooj Khan, Ahmed Ghani, and Muhammad Azeem Jawwad—of whom the elder two, Rauf and Urooj, have now attained mastery. He is additionally known especially for his steadiness of note and pitch which differentiates him from other musicians. His sons continue his legacy with their under their family group, the Saami Brothers.

== Early life and training ==
He began learning how to sing in 1956, when he was 10 years old, from his paternal uncle, Ustaad Munshi Raziuddin Ahmed, another renowned classical vocalist, Qawwal and musician of his time. In addition, he received training from other family elders, including his paternal uncle, Ustaad Sardar Khan Sahab, and his maternal uncle, Ustaad Pyare Khan Sahab (Meer Yaqoob Ali Khan Sahab). Alongside his intensive study of Khayal, he spent the next 20 years under the guidance of his paternal uncle, Ustaad Munshi Raziuddin Ahmed, learning ‘ilm al-ilhān—the knowledge of sound. Only after this rigorous and prolonged training did he attain the formal recognition of being considered a “student” at the age of 30. While he was in training, he was already seen as a master of khayal and performed throughout India, Pakistan, the Middle East. In Pakistan, he frequently sang live on PTV and Radio Pakistan.

== Career ==
Ustad Saami is the last living vocal practitioner of an ancient 49-note microtonal Surti (or shruti) scale.

With the help of Ustaad Saami's students Ali Sethi and Zeb Bangash, Ustaad Saami's recorded music was brought to the world internationally by Grammy-winning American producer, Ian Brennan (music producer), through three albums —God Is Not a Terrorist (2019), Pakistan Is for the Peaceful (2020), and East Pakistan Sky (2021)—recorded at Saami's home in Pakistan and released by Glitterbeat Records starting in 2019. These albums earned widespread global acclaim, with praise from Mojo, Uncut, and Songlines. His music has been described as “mesmerizing,” “progressive,” and “spiritually electrifying.” These albums led to Ustaad Saami & Sons performing for the first time ever in the UK (at the Womad festival) and in Australia at the Womadelaide festival.

His live performances have moved audiences worldwide, from the main stage at Peter Gabriel’s WOMAD festival to Le Guess Who? in the Netherlands, where his midnight performances brought audiences to tears. He was also invited to perform at Denmark's legendary Roskilde Festival.

He is featured in the 90-minute documentary movie Closer to God by Swiss director Annette Berger, which has been shown at numerous festivals including Le Guess Who, Oster and the Smithsonian Museum's Asian Art Galleries.

Since 2024, Ustaad Saami has toured across the United States, presenting sold-out performances at venues such as Asia Society (NY), Flushing Town Hall, Wolf Trap National Performing Arts Center, Seattle Town Hall and the South Asia Institute. He also led a month-long Khayal residency in Brooklyn, mentoring American students in the art of Khayal and microtonal singing, advancing cross-cultural musical exchange. Accompanied by his sons, Ustaad Saami continues to pass on this musical tradition through performance, teaching, and recording—sharing what he calls “music as food for the soul.”

Ustaad Saami is a strict practitioner of Sudh Bani (pure voice) style, emphasizing clarity of sur (pitch) and subtle emotional expression. His performances are renowned for their serenity, deeply meditative atmosphere, and heartfelt delivery of ragas and bandishes. In addition to Khayal, he also performs Thumri, Dadra, Tarana, and Sadra, showcasing his versatility across genres.

He has been awarded Pakistan's Tamgha-e-Imtiaz (Medal of Excellence) award in 2007 and the Pride of Performance Award in 2013 from the Government of Pakistan for his extraordinary contributions to music.

== Discography ==
- The lyrical tradition of khyal. 10, Nasiruddin Sâmi (Makar, 1999)
- God is not a terrorist, Ustad Saami (Glitterbeat Records, January 2019)
- Pakistan is for the peaceful, Ustad Saami (Glitterbeat, October 2020)
- East Pakistan Sky, Ustad Saami (Glitterbeat Records, October 2021)

== Awards and nominations ==
- 2025: Patron's Award from Aga Khan Music Awards.
- 2013: Pride of Performance Award by the President of Pakistan in 2013.
- 2007:Tamgha-i-Imtiaz (Medal of Excellence) Award by the Government of Pakistan.
- 2020: Ustad Saami's God is not a terrorist nominated for a Songlines Music Award, Best Asian Album category
- 2021: Ustad Saami's Pakistan is for the peaceful nominated for a Songlines Music Award, Best Asian Album category
- 2022: Ustad Saami's east Pakistan sky won a Songlines Music Award, Best Asia & Pacific Album category
