= Qawwal Bahauddin Khan =

Music group

TI Ustad Bahauddin Khan Qawwal Tamgha-i-Imtiaz (Medal of Excellence) Award (1999)
- Born: 15 June 1934; Delhi, British India
- Died: 2 February 2006 (aged 71–72); Karachi, Pakistan
- Occupations: Qawwal; Musician
- Musical career
- Genres: Qawwali
- Instruments: Harmonium; Tabla

Ustad Bahauddin Khan Qawwal (1934 – 3 February 2006) (Urdu: أستاذ قوّال بهاءالدين) was a Pakistani Qawwali musician in the music tradition of Qawwal Bacchon ka Gharana.

All five of his sons - Muhammad Najmuddin (born 1967), Saifuddin Mehmood (born 1971), Zafeeruddin Ahmed (born 1977), Mughisuddin Hassan (born 1979) and Ehtishamuddin Hussain (born 1981) have followed his footsteps. Traditional Qawwali singing heritage of the city of Karachi can still be felt and seen in a small neighborhood in Karachi named Qawwali Gali in the Saddar Town area, where a street is named after Bahauddin Qawwal.

== Early life ==
=== Historical background ===
Bahauddin Khan is descended from a family of musicians which traces its lineage back to the days of Amir Khusrow (the father of Qawwali) of the 13th century India. To propagate Islam throughout South Asia, Amir Khusrow banded together twelve youngsters (12 Kids Band), and personally trained them in singing and performing Qawwali, a genre of devotional Sufi music. He appointed Mian Saamat as the leader of this group, which was named the Qawwal Bachche (the qawwal kids). The Qawwal Bachche, in turn, taught Qawwali to other aspiring students.

Bahauddin Qawwal was born on 15 June 1934 in Hyderabad State, British India and died in Karachi on 2 February 2006 in Karachi, Pakistan. Bahauddin belongs to the Qawwal Bacchon gharana of Delhi, which was founded by Hazrat Khwaja Ameer Khusro in 13th century. Bahauddin is also the maternal nephew of famous Qawwal and classical singer Ustad Aziz Ahmed Khan Warsi. He received formal musical training from his father, Suleman Khan, and his uncle, Sardar Khan.

== Career ==
He began giving public performances, and won prizes and acclaim, from the early age of six, individually and also as an active member of the group Manzoor Niazi Qawwal and party. In 1947, he was decorated as Nunhay Raagi, in 1949 he received Certificate of Performance, and in 1951 earned the title of Nunhay Hind Raagi from the Indian Prime Minister.

In 2002, he earned the title of Ustad from the Vice President of Mauritius and also received a gold medal and a commemorative shield from the Minister of Arts & Culture.

In 1956, Bahauddin left the court of the Nizam of Hyderabad, India and migrated to Pakistan. There he started afresh with his cousins Munshi Raziuddin and Manzoor Ahmed Niazi which included his brother and other nephews also, under the patronage and guidance of his father, Suleman Khan.

In 1966, Bahauddin went solo under his own name.

Bahauddin performed all over the world, touring Europe, the Middle East, South Africa, Iran and India several times.

The National Centre for the Performing Arts (India) has recorded his classical style of Qawwali on the Golden Tape for safekeeping up to 200 years, as a reference and guide for researchers and scholars. Zoe Ansari, a research scholar and historian, recorded him for inclusion on a two- cassette audio-biography of Amir Khusro. The French broadcasting authorities and the BBC have also recorded Bahauddin for purposes of research and reference. His Qawwalis in Urdu, Persian and Arabic are regularly telecast in Pakistan. They have also toured Iran, Iraq, Afghanistan and some Central Asian Countries.

Bahauddin Qawwal and his family have been continuously attached to Sufi orders for the last seven centuries. They have been granted permanent rooms adjacent to the shrines of Moinuddin Chishti, Nizamuddin Auliya and Alauddin Sabir Kaliyari, in Ajmer, Delhi and Kalyar respectively, due to their regular services to and continuous attachment with these Sufi saints. Furthermore, the descendants of Nizamuddin Auliya conferred a Certificate of Affiliation on him and turbaned him and his sons in recognition of their family's attachment to the Sufi order of Nizamuddin Auliya.

== Awards ==
In 1999, he was awarded the Tamgha-i-Imtiaz (Medal of Excellence) by the President of Pakistan.

== Lineage ==
Bahauddin's sons have followed in his footsteps. In May 1999, Lok Virsa invited his sons Najmuddin and Saifuddin to perform at Islamabad at the National Youth Festival. In November–December 2005, they toured the UK, performing 13 concerts in 10 different cities. They went on to tour Switzerland in January 2006, performing in 6 cities. These concerts were arranged to raise funds for the victims of the 2005 Kashmir earthquake. Najmuddin and Saifuddin were recorded by Iran Radio, Zahedan, during their visit to Iran in 2000, and by the government network Pakistan Television as well the private ARY Digital network. They have received 'Hazrat Amir Khusro Award' and 'New Qawali Talent Award' for their performances.

After Qawwal Bahauddin Khan's death, the Sindh Minister for Sports and Culture established the Bahauddin Qawwal Award in his honor.
