= Delhi gharana =

Indian classical music gharana

The Delhi or Dilli Gharana, is a tabla traditional playing style, "regarded by many as the fountainhead of all the tabla gharanas" and known for being the first and oldest gharana playing style of tabla. It also is one of the six most common styles of playing of the Hindustani tabla.

This tradition was founded by Sidhar Khan Dhadi in the early 18th century. The tradition is regarded for establishing a distinction from pakhawaj repertoire, do ungliyon ka baaj (two-finger style), and contributing improvisation conventions like peshkar and qayada. Heirs of this gharana went on to establish other traditions like Punjab gharana, Lucknow gharana, Ajrada gharana, Farukhabad gharana and Benares gharana.

== History ==
=== Origins ===
Delhi Gharana was founded by Sidhar Khan Dhadi in the early-18th century. Sometimes referred to as the inventor of the tabla, Sidhar Khan Dhadi is the earliest available name associated with tabla in historical records. He was initially a pakhawaj player from the tradition of Lala Bhavanidas.

== Aesthetics ==
=== Technique ===
Considered a moderately resonant style (like Ajrada), the Delhi gharana is classified with the "bandh baaj" (closed style) rather than the "khula baaj" (open style) of Punjab gharana and Farukhabad gharana.

=== Repertoire ===
Delhi gharana is reputed for its vast repertoire of qayadas - a structured improvisation consisting of a theme and variations.

=== Musicality ===
Delhi gharana values sound quality that:

- Avoids overuse of the Bayan.
- Light, precise strokes (bols).
- Soft and esoteric temperament and style of playing.
- Strokes like "dha," "tita," "tirakita," and "tinakena" are prominent.

== Legacy ==
Sidhar Khan Dhadi and his descendants contributed greatly to the development of the tabla language, compositional structures of the peshkars and qayadas. Many compositions from this school are standard and introductory repertoire taught to students of all tabla gharanas.

== Exponents ==
A few notable masters of this school are Ustad Nathu Khan (1875–1940), Gamay Khan (1883–1958), Ustad Munnu Khan (the three brothers) and Ustad Gamay Khan's son Ustad Inam Ali Khan (1924–1986), his son Gulam Haider Khan, and Asif Ali Khan, Pandit Chatur Lal (1924–1966), Ustad Latif Ahmed Khan (1942-1989) and his sons Akbar Latif Khan and Babar Latif Khan, as well as Canadian tabla player and vocalist Cassius Khan (1974).

=== 18th Century ===
- Sidhar Khan Dhadi, founder of gharana
- Chand Khan, son and disciple of Chhote Khan
- Miyan Bakshu Ji, nephew and disciple of Siddhar Khan Dhadi. Founder of Lucknow gharana
- Ghasit Khan, son and disciple of Siddhar Khan Dhadi
- Miru Khan, disciple of Sitaab Khan. Co-founder of Ajrada gharana
- Kallu Khan, disciple of Sitaab Khan. Co-founder of Ajrada gharana
- Roshan Khan

=== 19th Century ===
- Munir Khan (1863-1937), disciple of Boli Baksh Khan. Also associated with Lucknow gharana and Farukhabad gharana

=== 20th Century ===
- Natthu Khan (1875-1940)
- Inam Ali Khan (1924-1986), son and disciple of Gami Khan
- Nikhil Ghosh (1918-1995)
- Ustad Latif Ahmed Khan (1942-1989), disciple of Gami Khan, and Inam Ali Khan
- Chatur Lal (1924-1966), disciple of Haji Mohammad Khan and Hafiz Miyan
- Asif Ali Khan, son and disciple of Abdul Hameed Khan. Also learned from Tufail Khan
- Faiyaz Khan (1934-2014), disciple of Inam Ali Khan
- [First Delhi Gharana Awarding Padam Shri Ustad Shafaat Ahmed Khan ] (1954-2005), son and disciple of Chhamma Khan.
