= Sindhe Khan =

Indian classical vocalist

Baba Sindhe Khan
- Born: 1885
- Died: 17 June 1950 (aged 65); Mumbai, Maharashtra, India
- Occupation: Hindustani Classical Vocalist
- Years active: 1900–1950
- Parent: Amir Khan (father)
- Musical career
- Genres: Khayal; Dhrupad; Dhamar; Tarana; Bhajan; Abhang; Natya Sangeet; Thumri
- Instrument: Voice

Baba Sindhe Khan (sometimes spelled Sendhe Khan or Sinde Khan) (c. 1885 – 17 June 1950) was an Indian classical vocalist of the Gwalior Gharana. He is known for being among the senior hereditary maestro musicians who influenced the pre-Independence Bombay musical scene and its many musicians.

Khan is memorialized in B. R. Deodhar's biographical anthology, Pillars of Hindustani Music.

== Background ==
=== Life and career ===
Khan was the son and disciple of Amir Khan, also known as "Meeran Baksh Khan." Amir Khan was a disciple of Banney Khan of Gwalior gharana. Some accounts suggest Amir Khan was also a cousin of Banney Khan. Amir Khan was a friend of Balakrishnabuwa Ichalkaranjikar.

After his father's early death, Khan and his brother Pyar Khan traveled extensively, including to Kabul and sang in small groups. He spent some time in Karachi with a wealthy patron, Seth Bishandas. Fond of mysticism, Bishandas' influence compelled Khan to live as a fakir.

In 1919, Khan relocated to Bombay and sustained himself on music tuitions. His reclusive and temperamental behavior led to a poor reputation. He developed an alcohol problem. He came into the care of one of his female disciples, Karamjan.

He often visited V. D. Paluskar's music school in Bombay and sing their about once or twice a month.

=== Death ===
On 17 June 1950, Khan died at St. George's Hospital in Bombay.

== Legacy ==
Khan does not appear to have major disciples outside of B. R. Deodhar and Bade Ghulam Ali Khan and his nephew Umeed Ali Khan. Nevertheless, his music influenced popular singers like Chhota Gandharva.

Khan's tomb is located at Shuklaji Street in Mumbai.
