= Bhaskarbuwa Bakhale =

Indian Classical Vocalist (1869–1922)

Bhaskar Raghunath Bakhale
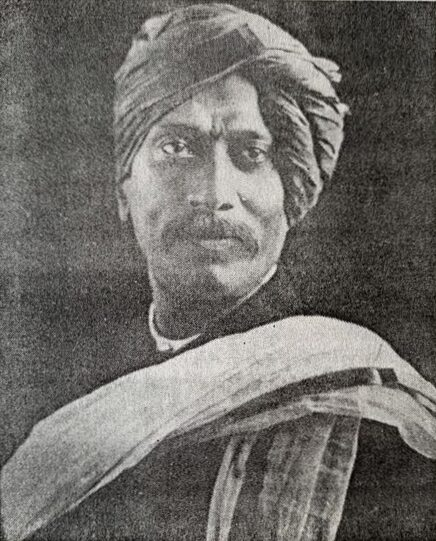

Background information
- Also known as: Bhaskarrao, Bhaskarbua, Bhaskarbuwa
- Born: Bhaskar Raghunath Bakhale; 17 October 1869
- Died: 8 April 1922 (aged 52)
- Genre: Hindustani classical music
- Occupations: Hindustani classical vocalist, composer, teacher

Bhaskar Raghunath Bakhale (17 October 1869 – 8 April 1922) (also known as Bhaskarrao or Bhaskarbua or Bhaskarbuwa) was a Hindustani classical vocalist, a composer, and a teacher.

== Education ==
Bhaskar Bakhale was born in a Karhade Brahmin family in Kathor, a village in Gujarat, India. His early training was in dhrupad and kirtan from Vishnubuwa Pingale in Vadodara. The royal family of Vadodara arranged for musical lessons in the school run by its court musician Maula Baksha. He then became a child artist at Kirloskar Natak Mandali, a musical theatre troupe of Annasaheb Kirloskar where he had the ganda-bandhan ceremony with Bande Ali Khan, a Rudra Veena performer from Kirana employed by the court of Indore. Faiz Mohammed Khan of Gwalior gharana taught him in Vadodara in 1886–1897 and then recommended further training from Natthan Khan of Agra gharana, a court musician at Jaipur and Mysore, and the father of Vilayat Hussain Khan. This apprenticeship continued in Mysore and Dharwad till the demise of Natthan Khan in 1901. In 1899, Natthan Khan recommended further training from Alladiya Khan, the founder of Jaipur-Atrauli gharana and a court musician of Kolhapur. Starting in 1901, Bakhale learnt from Alladiya Khan, his brother Haider Khan, and his nephew Natthan Khan. His apprenticeship with Alladiya Khan continued uninterrupted until Bakhale's own death in 1922. Overcome with Bakhale's memories, Alladiya Khan broke down and abruptly ended his 1922 Mumbai recital at the residence of Seth Vitthaldas; the recital was to celebrate the birthday of Seth Vitthaldas and was attended by Shahu Maharaj, the king of Miraj, the king of Dewas, and other dignitaries. Dilip Chandra Vedi has noted that, like Abdul Karim Khan, Bakhale was influenced by the style of Rahimat Khan (1856–1922), the younger son of Haddu Khan of Gwalior Gharana.

== Career ==
During 1883–1885, Bakhale performed as a child artist in the stage plays of Kirloskar Natak Mandali where Bhaurao Kolhatkar, Moroba Wagholikar, and Balakoba Natekar earned much fame as singers of folksy and light classical stage songs. After completing his training in classical music, Bakhale returned as a classical vocalist in 1899 or so. During 1897–1901, he served as a professor of music at a training college in Dharwad. Starting in 1901, he was based in Mumbai and Pune but performed throughout India and Nepal. He was given the honorary title "Deva Gandharva" (God Among Celestial Musicians). His notebook lists dhrupads and dhamars learnt by him but he rarely performed those in public. His typical recital comprised khyal ragas and an assortment of dadra, tappa, thumri, bhajan, songs from Marathi stage plays, and traditional Marathi light classical forms. He also had a successful career as the music director of Kirloskar Natak Mandali and, afterwards, of Gandharva Natak Mandali. Govindrao Tembe benefited from Bakhale's advisement in composing music for the stage play Sangeet Manapman (1911). Bakhale then composed music for new Marathi musical theatre stage plays such as Sangeet Vidyaharan (1913), Sangeet Swayamwar (1916), and Sangeet Draupadi (1920) by adopting compositions from classical Hindustani music. These compositions continue to be performed on stage and in Hindustani classical recitals. Several musicians, including Kumar Gandharva, Vasantrao Deshpande, and Anand Bhate, have released recordings presenting their interpretations of Bal Gandharva's renditions of these compositions. Bakhale taught and mentored Bal Gandharva from 1906 until his own death, and also brought Ahmed Jan Thirakwa to Gandharva Natak Mandali as its tabla maestro. In 1911, Bakhale started Bharat Gayan Samaj, an institute to teach music in Pune; the institute had its centenary in 2011.

== Disciples ==
Disciples to receive Bakhale's full formal training were Bal Gandharva, Tarabai Shirodkar, Dattatray Bagalkotkar (Dattoba), Bapurao Ketkar, and Master Krishnarao Phulambrikar; among these, Bal Gandharva received training specifically for stage songs (semi/light classical) only and not for classical vocal. He also taught others including Dattatreya Bagalkotkar, Narahar Patankar, Gundopant Walawalkar, Ganapat Purohit, Harishchandra Bali, Bhai Lal Amritsari, and Dilip Chandra Vedi. He also taught Ganesh Ramachandra Behare, a disciple of Abdul Karim Khan, for one year. Govindrao Tembe, who was his close associate starting 1901, had no interest in career as a vocalist and, instead, adopted Bakhale's teachings for pump organ harmonium playing. Bakhale taught Kesarbai Kerkar for 10 months ( learn only one raag 'sindhura ' in " bharat gayan samaj ") in 1914 and occasionally assisted Alladiya Khan in teaching her after she became Alladiya Khan's student in 1921. He also taught Vilayat Hussain Khan on a limited basis. Among these, Govindrao Tembe had a 50-year-long career as a harmonium player, as a music composer for stage plays and films, as an author of 5 books and several articles on music and musicians, and as a member of the central audition board of All India Radio. Bal Gandharva, Master Krishnarao, Vilayat Hussain Khan, and Kesarbai Kerkar had long careers as musicians and eventually became recipients of Padma Bhushan and Sangeet Natak Akademi Award instituted by the Government of India. Around 1920, Tarabai, held in high regards by many including Kesarbai Kerkar, renounced singing and retired to private life at a young age of 30; starting 1946, she made a few live recordings for All India Radio before dying in 1949. Dilip Chandra Vedi became a disciple of Faiyaz Khan of Agra gharana after Bakhale's death and had a long career as a vocalist and as an instructor of music at Bharatiya Kala Kendra, New Delhi. Pt Ram Marathe was the famous disciple of Master Krishnarao Phulambrikar. Master Krishnarao Phulambrikar not only taught Pt.Ram Marathe his own classical music compositions but also taught him the traditional classical music compositions which he learnt from Pt. Bhaskarbuwa Bakhale.

== Legacy ==
Bakhale was one of the first vocalists to receive traditional training from multiple gharana systems. Since the start of the 17th century, Hindustani classical music had become a stronghold of Muslim musicians and Balakrishnabuwa Ichalkaranjikar (1840–1926) was one of the few Hindu vocalists to earn fame at it in the 19th century. He toured and taught extensively in the states of Maharashtra, Gujarat, and Karnataka. The next generation of Hindu musicians from these states included Bakhale, Vishnu Digambar Paluskar, Ramakrishna Vaze, and Vishnu Narayan Bhatkhande who did much to liberate the teaching and dissemination of classical music and to create an honorable social status for professional musicians. Unlike Paluskar and Bhatkhande, Bakhale introduced no radical reforms in the teaching methodology or in organizational aspects of this movement. However, his personal concerts, rapport with other musicians, and compositions for stage plays – rendered popular by Bal Gandharva, Keshav Bhosale, Dinanath Mangeshkar, and others – was a major factor in cultivating a taste for classical and semi-classical music in Marathi speaking population of India. B. R. Deodhar has observed that this contribution is one of the reasons why western India developed and remained as a major force in classical Indian music starting the turn of the 19th century. Bakhale was universally regarded an ideal and perfectly balanced vocalist.

Bakhale has left no recorded legacy. Gramophone Company had unsuccessfully arranged for two sets of his recordings in 1911. No trace of his style or musical approach exists today apart from what can be discerned from his semi-classical compositions for stage plays. His manuscript on all Hindustani classical compositions learnt by him, including the full repertoire of Faiz Mohammed Khan of Gwalior gharana, was in preparation at the time of his death. Shaila Datar, a musician married to his grandson Sudhir, has since completed this project and has released the book. After Bakhale's death in 1922, his disciple Master Krishnarao became the director of Bharat Gayan Samaj and wrote seven volumes of Raagsangrahmala as curriculum of its music course. Bharat Gayan Samaj, set up by Bakhale in Pune, organizes musical recitals in his memory and observes his anniversaries. Kalyan Gayan Samaj, set up in Kalyan in 1926 as a homage to Bakhale, is active in music circles and organizes a conference titled "Deva Gandharva Mahotsav" annually. Pracheen Kala Kendra in Chandigarh holds a conference titled "All India Bhaskar Rao Nritya and Sangeet Sammelan" annually. Pune University annually confers a Pt. Bhaskarbuwa Bakhale Award on the student standing first in its Bachelor of Arts program in the music discipline. Mumbai University annually confers a similar award on the student standing first in its Master of Arts program in the music discipline.
