= Vidyadhar Vyas =

- Born: 8 September 1944 (age 81)
- Origin: Nagpur, India
- Genres: Hindustani classical music, Gwalior Gharana
- Occupation: Classical Vocalist
- Years active: 1965 - present

Pandit Vidyadhar Vyas (born 8 September 1944) is an Indian Hindustani vocalist, and a contemporary exponent of the Paluskar style of North Indian classical singing. He belongs to the Gwalior gharana and the lineage of Sangeet Maharshi Pandit Vishnu Digambar Paluskar contributed to his background.

== Early life and background ==
Vidyadhar Vyas was born in Maharashtra to Gayanacharya Pandit Narayanrao Vyas, a disciple of Pandit Paluskar. He was trained by his father in the Hindustani music arts of khayal, tarana and bhajan gayaki.

He holds a Master's degree in Sociology from the University of Mumbai and a Doctorate in Hindustani Classical Vocal Music from the Akhil Bharatiya Gandharva Mahavidyalaya Mandal in Mumbai.

== Career ==
Awarded Top Grade status by All India Radio, Pandit Vyas has appeared on television and released several cassettes and CDs, as well as performing at many major festivals in India, and playing shows in the United States, Europe, Mauritius and elsewhere.

Pandit Vyas has presented several programmes on the genesis and evolution of Hindustani Raga Music, and has also written articles for music journals and delivered lectures.

As well as a performing artist, Vidyadhar Vyas has been teaching and mentoring students at undergraduate and postgraduate levels since 1964 and doctorate level since 1972. In 1973 he became Principal of the Government Music College (Rajasthan Sangeet Sansthan) at Jaipur. In 1984 he became Head of the Department of Music at the University of Mumbai. In February 2004, he became the first Vice Chancellor of the newly formed Bhatkhande Music Institute in Lucknow, Uttar Pradesh.

In August 2007 he took over as Executive Director of ITC Sangeet Research Academy, Kolkata. Vyas was awarded the Sangeet Natak Akademi Award in 2007. Recently he awarded Tansen Samman in 2019.

== Bibliography ==
- Colors of the Night by Vidyadhar Vyas
