= Kedar Bodas =

Indian classical vocalist

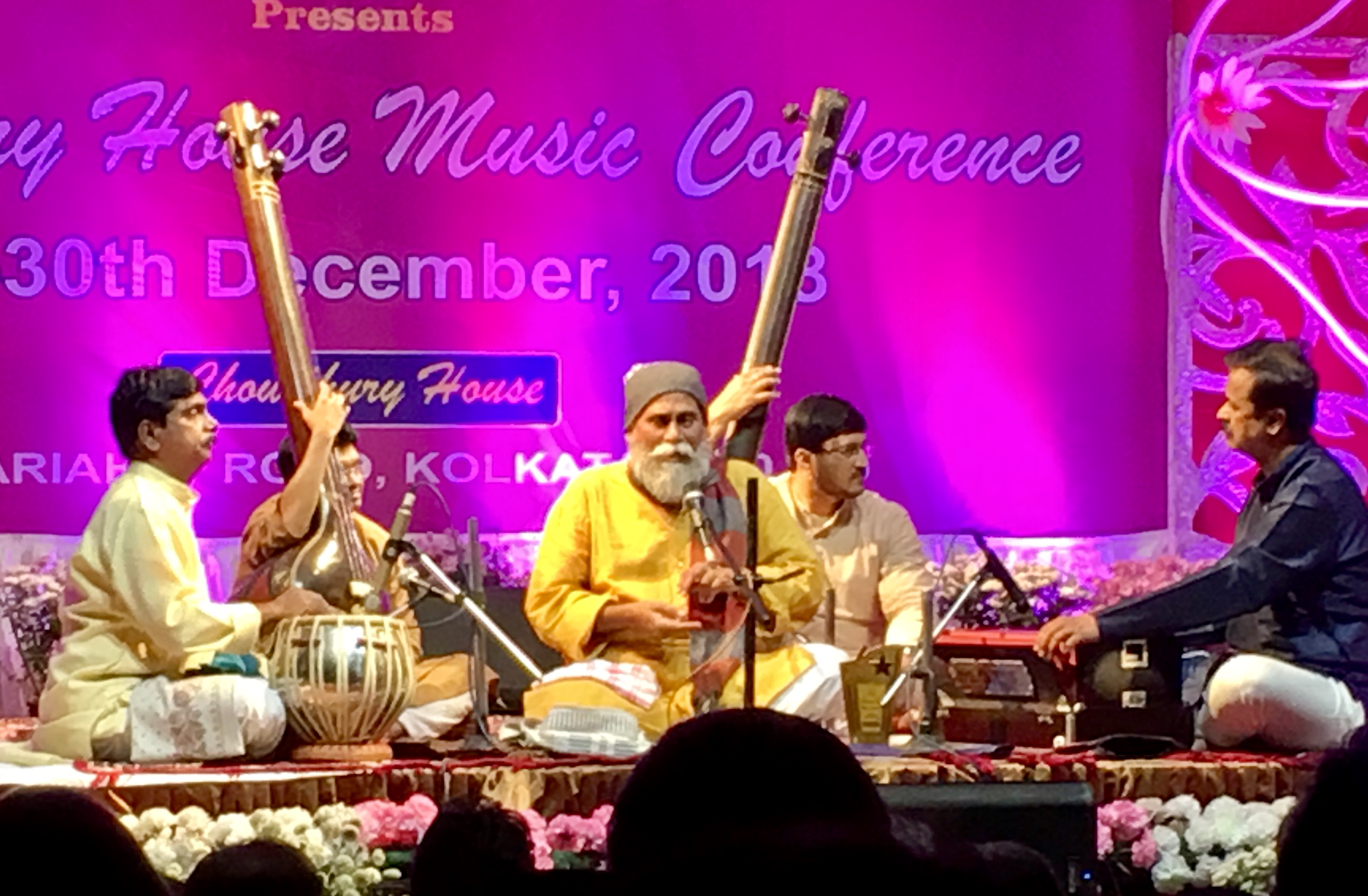

Background information
- Born: April 22, 1963
- Died: April 24, 2023 (aged 60) Pune, India
- Genres: Hindustani classical music
- Instrument: vocalist

Kedar Bodas (1963–2023) was an Indian classical vocalist belonging to the Gwalior gharana. He was described by Scroll.in as a "master khayal singer."

== Early life ==
Bodas was born into a family of musicians. He received early training from his grandfather Lakshmanrao Bodas and his father Narayanrao Bodas.

As a child, Bodas learned to play the tabla, but eventually focused on vocals. He received training from Pandurang Salunke, Shreedhar Padhye, Ashok Ranade, C.P. Rele, and T.D. Janorikar. He was, according to his collaborators, also influenced by Ram Marathe, D.V. Paluskar, Gajananrao Joshi, and Kumar Gandharva.

He performed across India, and composed the music for six documentary films.

In addition to his work as a performer, he was also a musical scholar and a linguist. He did a four-year advanced course in Russian, which helped expose him to Western Classical and Russian folk music.

He received the Mallikarjun Mansur award in 2018.
