= Manjusha =

Manjusha may refer to:

- Manjusha Art, an art form
- Manjusha Museum, a museum in Dharmasthala, India
- Manjusha Kulkarni-Patil (born 1971), Indian classical music vocalist
- Manjusha Kanwar (born 1971), Indian badminton player
- Mandasa (Odia: Manjusha), a village in Srikakulam district, Andhra Pradesh, India
