= Vinayakbuva Utturkar =

Late Pt. Vinayakbuva Utturkar (1914–1989) was a Hindustani classical music vocal performer. He was an 'A' grade artist of All India Radio (AIR), Dharwar and had also performed at AIR Delhi, Mumbai, Hyderabad and Pune.

== Personal life ==
He was born in Miraj to Pt. Vishnu Keshav Utturkar (Joshi) and Laxmi Vishnu Utturkar (Joshi) in 1914. He was the only brother to his five sisters. He completed his education up to inter-science there. He then focused on Indian classical music as a career path. Growing up in a musical family, he pursued a career in Indian classical music after completing his education. He then moved to Belgaum and started teaching at Vanita Vidyalaya as a music instructor and teacher. He was married to Bageshri Utturkar (1924–2015). He died in September 1989 and was survived by his four sons, Ravindra, Vikas, Arun and Uday.

His maternal uncle was the freedom fighter Vasudev Balwant Gogate, also known as Hotson-Gogate for his attempted attack on the then-governor of Mumbai (Bombay), John Ernest Buttery Hotson, during India's struggle for freedom from the British. (See notes).

== Training ==
His initial training in Indian classical vocal music was under his father, Pt. Vishnu Keshav Utturkar (Joshi). He took his advanced training under Pt. Mirashi Buwa, who himself was trained under Pt. Balakrishnabuwa Ichalkaranjikar of Gwalior gharana.

His father, Pt. Vishnu Keshav Utturkar (Joshi), was a disciple of Neelkanthbuva, who in turn was a disciple of Pt. Balakrishnabuwa Ichalkaranjikar.

== Awards ==
He belonged to the Gwalior gharana (Pt. Balakrishnabuwa Ichalkaranjikar tradition). Utturkar received the Karnataka State Sangeet Nrutya Academy Award for 1979, which was presented on 30 March 1980 by the Governor of Karnataka, Govind Narain.

Vinayakbuva Utturkar Award - certificate

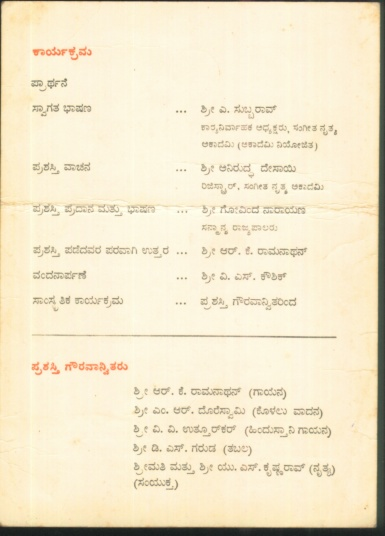
Vinayakbuva Utturkar Award information

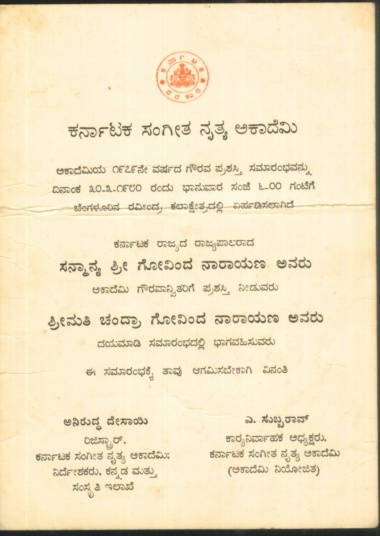
Vinayakbuva Utturkar Award details

He had also performed in the Mysore Dasara festival.

Throughout his musical career, Utturkar was accompanied at public performances and on All India Radio broadcasts by musicians including Ustad Ahmed Jan Thirakwa and R. K. Bijapure.

== Pupils ==
One of Utturkar's pupils was Indian classical violinist Pt. Ratnakar Gokhale.

== Notes ==
- Bulletin of International News (Royal Institute of International Affairs), vol. 8 (1931-1932), p. 86.
- Y.D. Phadke, Senapati Bapat: Portrait of a Revolutionary (Bombay: Senapati Bapat Centenary Celebration Samiti, 1981), p. 48.
