= Yeshwant Balkrishna Joshi =

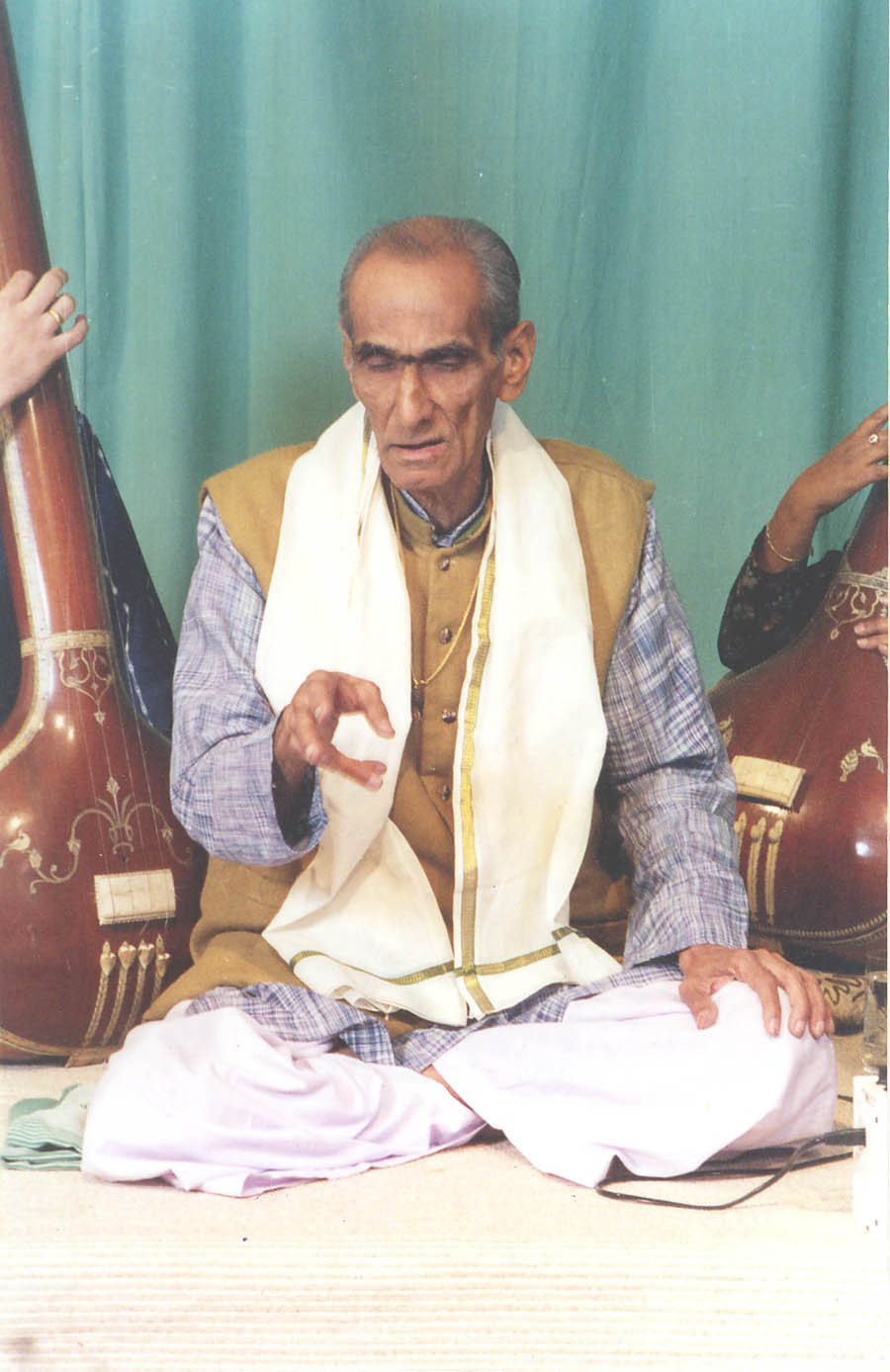
- In 2004
- Born: 1928; Pune, Maharashtra
- Died: 5 October 2012 (aged 84); Mumbai, Maharashtra
- Other name: Pandit Yeshwantbuwa Joshi

Yeshwant Balkrishna Joshi (1928 - 5 October 2012), also known as Yeshwantbuwa Joshi, was an Indian vocalist of the Khayal genre of Hindustani classical music.

Pandit Yeshwantbuwa Joshi was born at Pune, India. He learned initially from Mirashi Buwa of Gwalior gharana, but then moved to Bombay and learned the style of Agra gharana from Jagannathbuwa Purohit. He was additionally influenced by the styles of Gajananbuwa Joshi and Chhota Gandharva.

His disciples include Ram Deshpande and Asha Khadilkar.

He was awarded the Maharashtra Government Gaurav Puraskar in 1993, and the Sangeet Natak Akademi Award in 2003.
