= Ramkrishnabuwa Vaze =

Ramkrishna Vaze
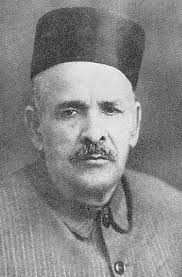

Background information
- Born: 28 November 1871
- Origin: Village Vazare, Sindhudurg District, Bombay Presidency
- Died: 5 May 1945 (aged 73)
- Genres: Hindustani classical music, Natyageet, Bhajan, Thumri
- Occupations: Singer, Actor
- Years active: 1890-1945
- Labels: His Master's Voice, Columbia

Ramkrishnabuwa Vaze, also known as Vazebuwa, (28 November 1871 – 5 May 1945) was a Hindustani Classical musician of the Gwalior tradition known for his impact on popularizing classical music and its impression on Natyageet in the early half of the 20th century.

== Background ==
Born in Vazare, Maharashtra in 1871, Vaze lost his father at an early age and was brought up by his mother. He studied briefly in school. With an interest in music surpassing academics, Vaze's mother helped him take lessons in music from several teachers, spending several years moving around. He learned from musicians like Balwantrai Pohre and Vitthoba Hadap of Malwan. After being married and taking up household duties, Vaze set out to pursue music.

== Music career ==
=== Training ===
With Gwalior regarded as the home of khayal music at the time, many traveled there to learn music. After traveling to Pune, Bombay, Indore Ujjain, and Benaras, Vaze met Bade Nissar Hussain Khan, the son of Natthe Khan, and became his disciple. Though experiencing suffering and hardship, Vaze remained focused on music, and accumulated a repertoire of rare compositions from his guru.

=== Court Musician ===
He was honored as a court musician of Nepal.

=== Popularity ===
==== Recordings ====
Recording and releasing several 78 rpm records in 1933, Vaze's fame grew nationally and particularly in Maharashtra.

==== Natya Sangeet ====
Between 1920 and 1931, Vaze was engaged as composer by the Lalitkaladarsh Sangeet Natak Mandali and the Balwant Sangeet Mandali. Reputed actor-singers trained under him during this period, like Dinanath Mangeshkar. Vaze was respected for bringing "serious music" and rare compositions to the masses and has been attributed with cultivating a popular audience for classical music.

=== Musical style ===
Historians note how Vaze excelled at layakari, clear and forceful taans, and powerful gamaks. His style became so iconic that B. R. Deodhar referred to his style as "Vaze gayaki." He was responsible for bringing many little known ragas to light and as a composer, his specialty was bandishes in fast tempo. He specialized in rare raags like Gaud Kalyan, Gaudgiri, and Nat Bilawal.

== Legacy ==
Vaze is known as one of the most famous exponents of the Gwalior gharana and a genius composer. He published books and articles on classical music, rare for artists of that time.

Vaze taught many disciples, several of whom have left indelible marks on the course of Indian music, including Shivrambuwa Vaze (his son), Keshavrao Bhosle, Bapurao Pendharkar, Dinanath Mangeshkar, Gururao Deshpande, Vinayakrao Patwardhan and others.

Swami Vivekananda and Vaze were admirers of one another and the former and blessed the latter.

== Personal life ==
Vaze was regarded by peers and students as an eccentric. He lived in Pune. He died 5 May 1945.

== Discography ==
Album	Year	Type
Tilak Kamod, Miyan Malhar; Bhairav Bahar, Jaunpuri; Nat Bihag, Marwa; Barwa, Bhajan; Khambavati, Tilang Thumri; Bhatiyar, Gara Bageshri	1932	78pm
Todi, Shataraga (Khat); Brindavani Sarang, Khamaj; Bhatiyar, Kafi Kanada	1939	LP

== Bibliography ==
- Sangeet Kala Prakash (1938, two volumes)
