= Laxmi Ganesh Tewari =

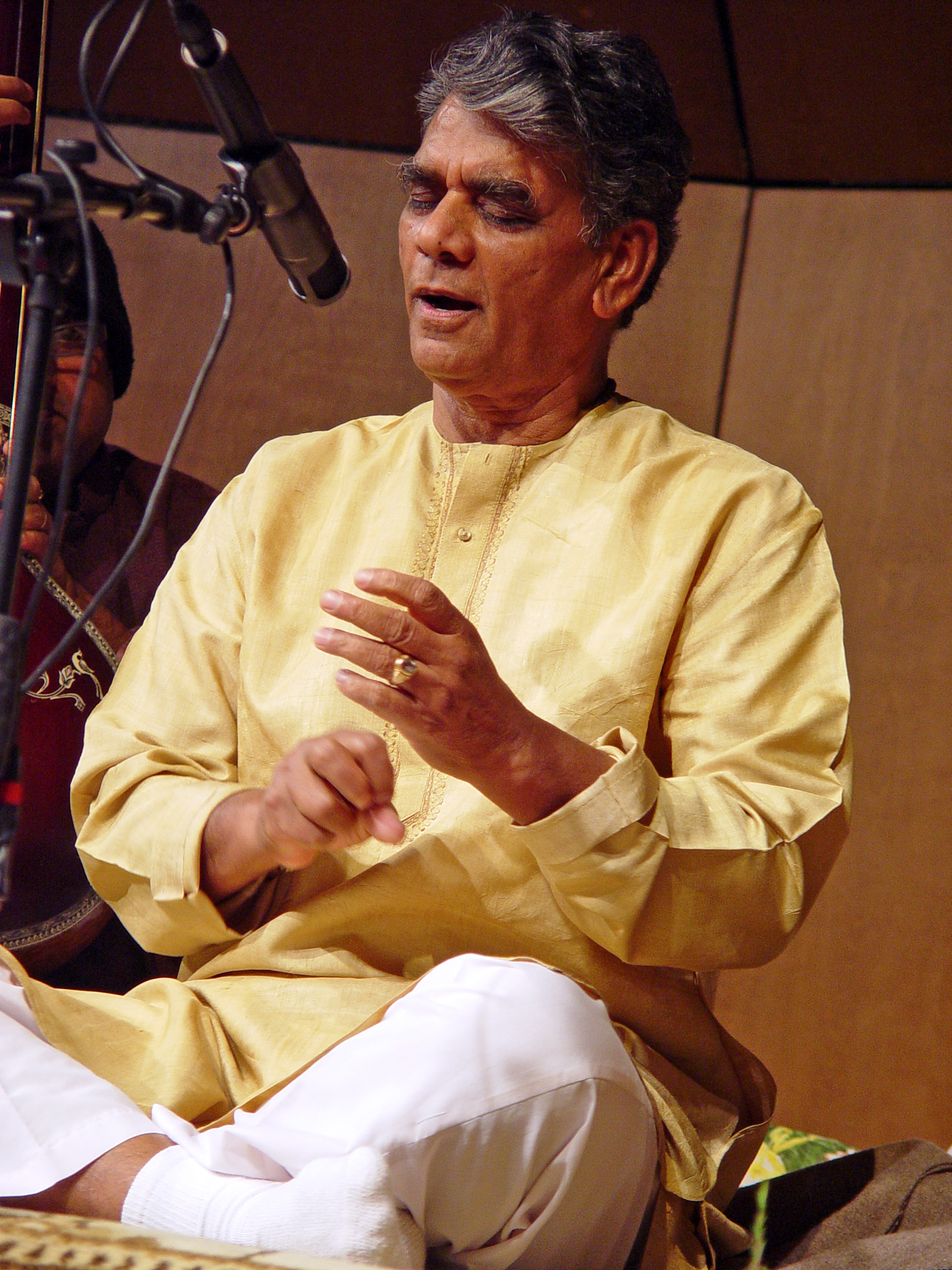
- Laxmi G. Tewari performing, February 2007, photograph by Linnea Mullins

Background information
- Born: 8 September 1938 (age 86); Kanpur, United Provinces, British India
- Genres: Hindustani classical music
- Occupation(s): ethnomusicologist, singer
- Instrument: singing

Pandit Laxmi Ganesh Tewari (born 8 September 1938) is a Hindustani vocalist from India. He is an exponent of the Gwalior gharana (tradition) of vocal music. After studying with Lalmani Misra at Banaras Hindu University in Varanasi, he pursued education and teaching opportunities in America. At Sonoma State University since 1974, his career has combined performance, scholarship and teaching.

== Early life and education ==
Born in 1938 in Kanpur, Uttar Pradesh, India, Tewari studied at Banaras Hindu University with Lalmani Misra, Madhav Vaman Thakar, and B. R. Deodhar, earning a doctor of music degree in 1967. He moved to the United States to study at Wesleyan University, where he earned a Ph.D. in ethnomusicology in 1974.

== Academic career ==
Tewari has been on the faculty of Sonoma State University in California since 1974. He has also made numerous recordings of his music; chief amongst them is his rendering of Sameshwari, a Raga created by Dr. Lalmani Misra to preserve the notes of Samagana of Sama Veda period. He has conducted field research in India, Turkey, Trinidad & Tobago, Thailand, Fiji, Ghana, and Zimbabwe. In addition to his books and recordings, Tewari's articles have appeared in South Asia Research, South Asia Journal, and Asian Folklore Studies.

== Books ==
- A Splendor of Worship: Women's Fasts, Rituals, Stories, and Art. New Delhi: Manohar, 1991.
- Alhakhand ki Parampara. Lucknow: Uttar Pradesh Sangeet Natak Akademy, 1993.
- Folk Songs of Trinidad Indians. Port of Spain, Trinidad: SWAHA publications, 1994.
- Singitendu Pandit Lalmaniji Misra: Ek Pratibhavan Sangitagya. Santa Rosa, California: Svar Sadhana, 1996.
- Svar Sadhana. Santa Rosa, California: Svar Sadhana, 1998.
- Folk Songs from Uttar Pradesh, India. New Delhi: D.K. Printworld, 2006.
- Music of the Indian Diaspora in Trinidad. Pompano Beach: Caribbean Studies Press, 2010.

== Discography ==
Personal recordings

- Laxmi G. Tewari: Master Indian Classical Vocalist. San Rafael, California: Alam-Madina, 1983.
- Background vocal music for Sacred Verses, Healing Sounds, by Deepak Chopra (two audio cassettes). San Rafael, California: New World Library, 1994.
- Morning Glory: Indian Classical Vocal Music. Santa Rosa, California: Svar Sadhana, 1995.
- Bhajan: A Rainbow of Devotional Songs. Santa Rosa, California: Svar Sadhana, 1998.
- Svaranjali. Santa Rosa, California: Svar Sadhana, 2002.

Documentary recordings from field research

- Turkish Village Music. New York: Nonesuch Records, 1972.
- Folk Music of India: Uttar Pradesh. New York: Lyrichord Discs, 1975; reissued on CD with new material, 2006.
- Nectar of the Moon: Vichitra Vina Music of Northern India. Nonesuch Records, 1981.
- Folk Music of Uttar Pradesh, India. Traditional Music of the World Series. Berlin: International Institute for Comparative Music Studies, 1991.
- Vichitra Vina Music from South Asia. Anthology of Traditional Music. Paris: Auavidis/UNESCO, 1996.
- Trinidad: Music from the North Indian Tradition. Anthology of Traditional Music. Paris: Auavidis/UNESCO, 1999.
- Celestial Music of Pandit Lalmani Misra. Santa Rosa, California: Svar Sadhana, 2007.
