= R. K. Bijapure =

- Also known as: Pandit Rambhau Bijapure, Bijapure Master
- Born: Ram Kallo Bijapure; 7 January 1917
- Died: 19 November 2010 (aged 93)
- Genres: Indian classical music
- Occupation: Musician
- Instrument: Harmonium
- Years active: 1938–2010

R. K. Bijapure (7 January 1917 – 19 November 2010) was an Indian harmonium player in the Hindustani classical tradition.

== Early life ==
Bijapure was born in 1917 at Kagwad (Belgaum district, Karnataka state, India). His father, Kallopant Bijapure, was a dramatist and composer. Bijapure's first guru was Annigeri Mallayya. He took further training in harmonium from Rajwade, Govindrao Gaikwad and Hanmantrao Walwekar. He also learned vocal music from stalwarts like Ramkrishnabua Vaze, Shivrambua Vaze, Kagalkarbua and Utturkarbua (Pt. Vishnu Keshav Utturkar (Joshi)).

== Education ==
Sangeet Visharad (vocal) and Sangeet Alankar (harmonium) from Akhil Bharatiya Gandharva Mahavidyalaya.

== Career ==
Early career: Bijapure worked as a music director and harmonium player for Venkobrao Shirahatti's drama company, as a harmonium player for His Master's Voice company, as a music examiner for Akhila Bharatiya Gandharva Mahavidyalaya and for the Karnataka Government.

Bijapure has his own unique style of harmonium solo. He has given solo performances in all of the major music centers of the country including Pune, Hyderabad, Bangalore, Kolhapur, Hubli, Dharwad and on air. During the Festival of Russia in India, a Russian delegation was mesmerized after listening to Panditji's solo. They specially recorded on the video his swift finger movements on the harmonium keyboard.

As an accompanist, he accompanied four generations of vocalists including Ramkrishnabuwa Vaze, Shivrambua Vaze, Kagalkarbua, Utturkarbua, Sawai Gandharva, D.V. Paluskar, Pt. Vinayakbuva Utturkar, Ustad Amir Khan, Ustad Bade Ghulam Ali Khan, Gangubai Hangal, Bhimsen Joshi, Basavaraj Rajguru, Mallikarjun Mansur, Kumar Gandharva, Manik Varma, Prabha Atre, Kishori Amonkar and Malini Rajurkar. He has a unique style of accompaniment. While complementing the main artistes he uses the pauses available in between to add charm to the concert. Building a continuous rapport with the audience is another feature of his presentation.

As music guru: He started “Shri Ram Sangeet Mahavidyalaya” in 1938. Over 10,000 students have learned under his tutelage. His well-known disciples include Sudhanshu Kulkarni, Ravindra Mane, Ravindra Katoti, Kunda Welling, Shridhar Kulkarni, Mala Adhyapak, Aparna Chitnis, Madhuli Bhave, Deepak Marathe and Mahesh Telang.

== Death ==
Bijapure died on 19 November 2010 due to old age related health issues. He was still actively teaching his disciples until days prior to his death.

== Awards and recognitions ==
- 1985 - "Karnataka Kala Tilak" by Sangeet Nritya Academy
- 1992 - "Nadashree Puraskar" given by Hindustani Sangeet Kalakar Mandali, Bangalore
- 1999 - “Sangatkar Puraskar” conferred by Gandharva Mahavidyalaya, Pune
- 2001 - “Rajya Sangeet Vidvan” at the Dasara festival held in Mysore
- 2003 - "T.Chowdaiah Prashasti"
- 2006 - “Mahamahopadhyay” by Akhil Bharateeya Gandharva Mahavidyalay Mandal
