= Mirashi =

Mirashi is both a given name and a surname. Notable people with the name include:

- Mirashi Buwa (1883–1966), Indian classical singer
- Vasudev Vishnu Mirashi (1893–1985), Sanskrit scholar and Indologist
- Pal Mirashi (1925–2001), Albanian footballer

== See also ==
- Miras
