= Manjusha Kulkarni-Patil =

Indian classical musician (born 1971)

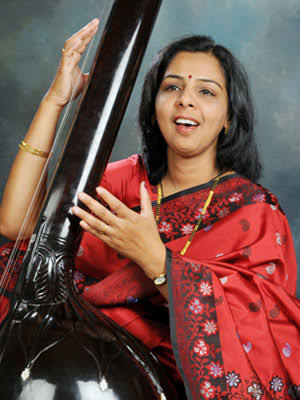

Background information
- Also known as: Swar Manjusha
- Born: Manjusha Kulkarni; 1971 (age 54–55); Sangli, Maharashtra, India
- Genres: Hindustani classical music
- Occupation: Singer
- Website: www.manjushapatil.com

Manjusha Kulkarni-Patil (born 1971) is an Indian Hindustani classical music vocalist. She belongs to the classical music Gwalior gharana.

== Early life ==
Manjusha Kulkarni-Patil was born in Sangli, Maharashtra, India on 2 November 1971, in a family of musicians. She started learning classical music at the age of twelve from Chintubua Mhaiskar. She has a Master of Arts in Music and also has the Sangeet Visharad degree awarded by the Akhil Bharatiya Gandharva Mahavidyalaya in Miraj. She got an opportunity to study music under able guidance of Late Sangeetacharya Pt. D.V. Kanebuwa of Agra and Gwalior Gharanas for 12 years. Presently she is taking guidance from Padmashri Pt. Ulhas Kashalkar and Dr. Vikas Kashalkar. Manjusha secured first position in the M.A (Music) examination and also received the Sangeet Visharad degree awarded by the Akhil Bharatiya Gandharva Mahavidyalaya, Miraj. She is an 'A' grade artist for classical and semi-classical music on All India Radio.

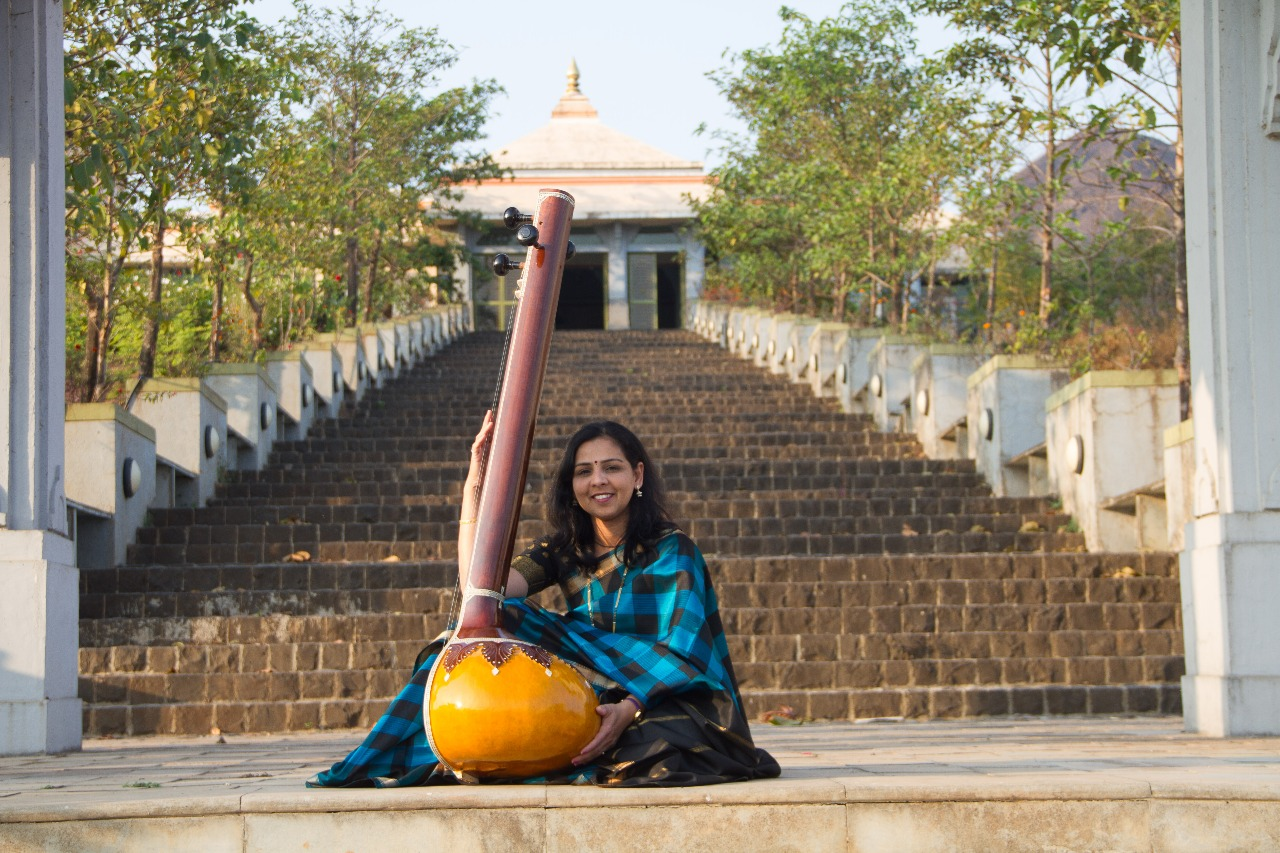

== Career ==
Manjusha Kulkarni-Patil is known for her Khayal form of Hindustani music. She also excels in Semi Classical Musical forms like Thumari, Bhajan and Natya-Sangeet etc. She performs at all major classical music festivals like Sawai Gandharva Bhimsen Festival, Tansen festival. Manjusha has performed at various music conferences all over India and abroad like UAE, Muscat and U.S.A. Some of them included Sawai Gandharva Mahotsav, Pune, Tansen Samaroha, Gwalior, All Bengal Music Festival, Kolkata, Malhar Festival, Nehru Centre, Mumbai, Kala Akadami, Goa, Sur Mandal, Hyderabad, Akashwani Sangeet Sammelan, Chandigadh, Sangeet Ashram, Dover Lane Kolkata, Kalakshetra, Chennai, BMM Convention at Chicago, USA.

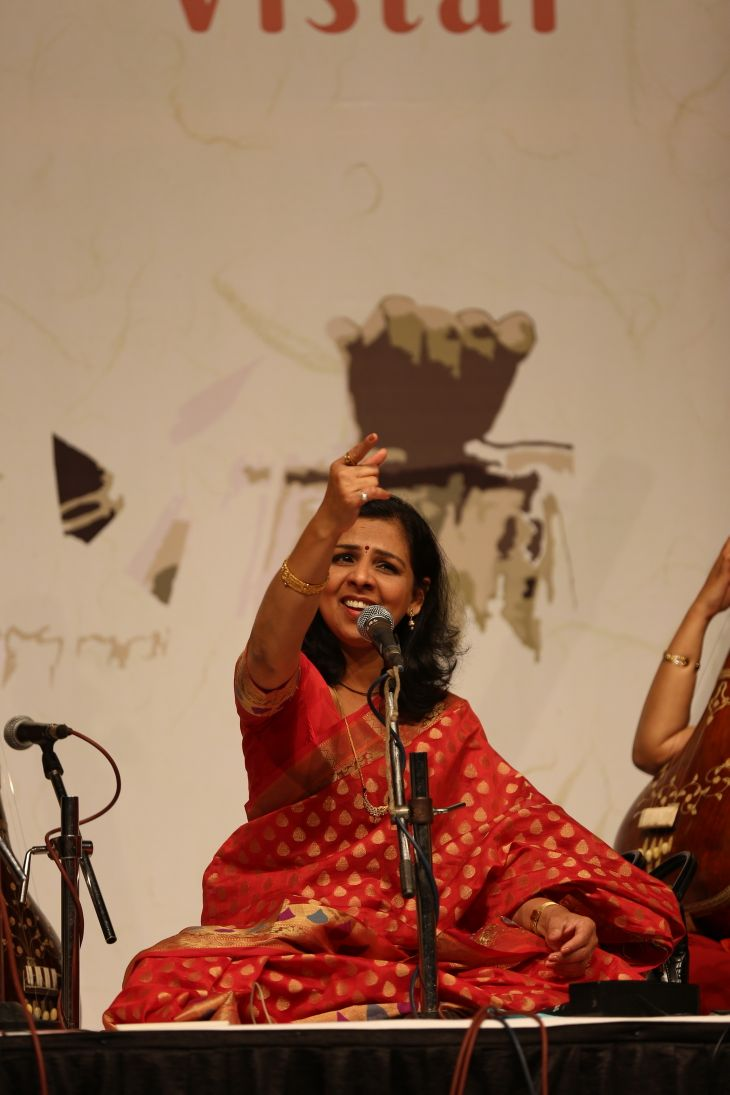

== Awards ==
- Ustaad Faiyaz Khan Award 2023
- Sangeet Maharshi Dr.Annasaheb Gunjkar Puraskae 2023
- Gaansaraswati Puraskar 2020
- Basavraj Rajguru Yuva Puraskar from the Government of Karnataka
- Kumar Gandharv Award 2016-17
- Ustad Bismillah Khan Yuva Purskar, 2010 by Sangeet Natak Academy
- Guruvarya B S Upadhye Smruti Puraskar in 2010
- Shanmukhananda Sangeet Shiromani Puraskar in 2008
- Malati Pande Puraskar in 2005
- Manik Varma Puraskar in 2005
- Jasraj Gaurav Pursakar in 1998
- Ramkrishnabuwa Vaze Puraskar in 1996
- Late musician Shri Ram Kadam Puraskar in 1994 -1995
- Light Classical Music with Gold Medal in 1988

== Performances ==
- Lakshmi Vilas Palace, Vadodara
- 44th Chandigarh Sangeet Sammelan, Chandigarh
- Arunkumar Sen Smriti Samaroh, Raipur
- Mitra Mahotsav, Pune
- Ramkrishna Math, Manglore
- Poornahuti Mahotsav, Pune in 2021
- Khayal Yadnya in 2021
- Ganasarswati Mahotsav in 2020
- Surashree Sangeet Mahotsav, Sangli
- Gurubaani Project, Delhi
- Gunijan Sangeet Samaroh, Indore.
- Bhimsen Joshi Samaroh, Nashik in 2015
- SAPTAK Mahostav, Ahemdabad in 2015.
- IIC, India International Centre, New Delhi in 2014
- Kumar Gandharv Sangeet Mahostav in 2011
- Mani Mann Fellowship Concert at Habitat Centre, New Delhi
- Ustad Rahamat Khansaheb Mahostav, Dharwad
- BKF Foundation, Banglore
- Kalakshetra, Chennai
- Sangeet Ashram, Dover Lane Kolkatta
- Akashwani Sangeet Sammelan, Chandigarh
- Chandigadh Sangeet Sammelan
- Swar Sadhana, Baroda
- Gandharva Mahavidyalaya, Delhi
- Sur Mandal, Hyderabad
- Kala Akadami, Goa
- Vanita Samaj, Delhi
- Maharashtra Mandal, Delhi
- L. Deshpande Foundation Programmes at NCPA, Mumbai
- Malhar Festival, Nehru Centre, Mumbai
- All Bengal Music Festival, Kolkata
- Alla Uddin Khan Saheb Academy, Bhopal
- Tansen Samaroha, Gwalior in 2005
- Sawai Gandharva Mahotsav, Kundgole
- Sawai Gandharva Mahotsav, Pune in 1998 and 2002

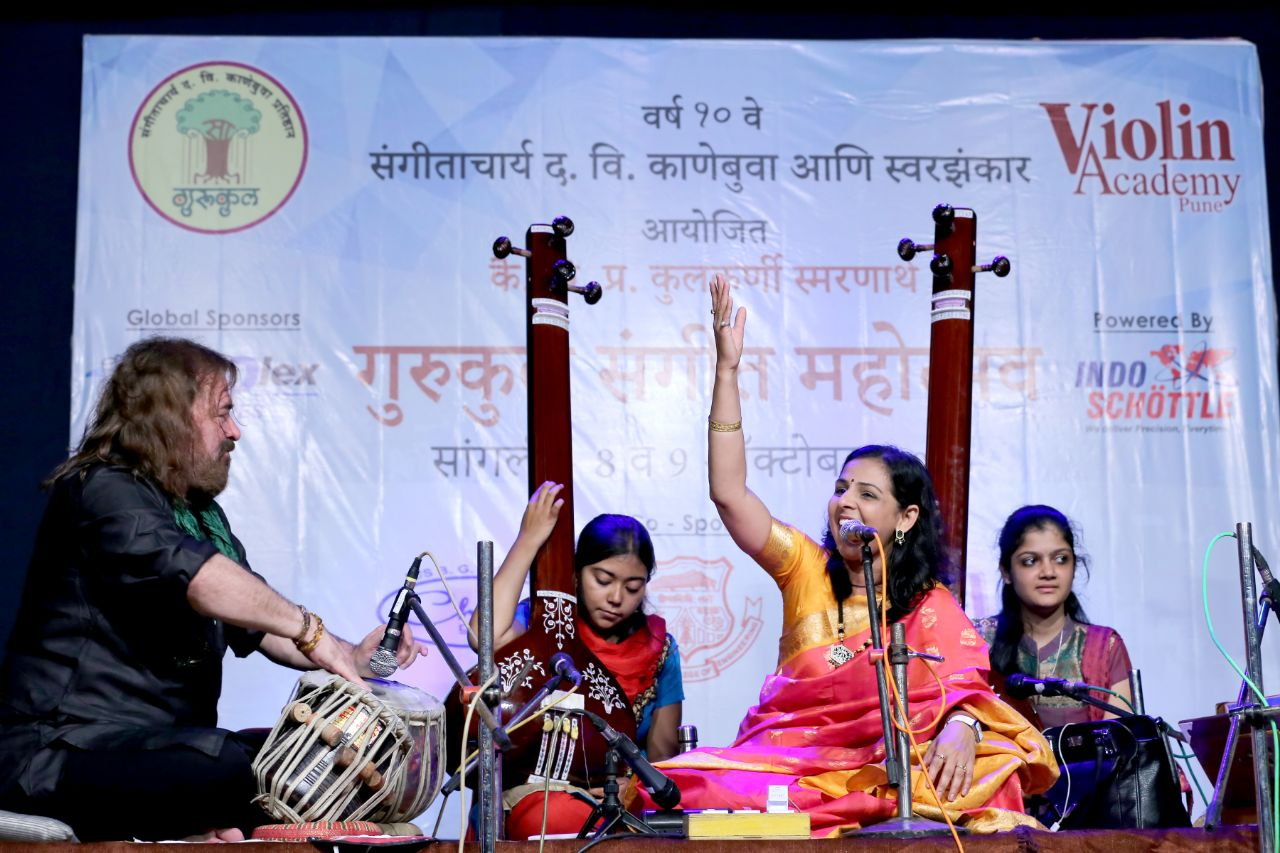

== Discography ==
- Raga Bihag, Natyasangeet & Bhajan
- Raga Barwa & Raga Poorvi
- Raga Multani (Live Concert)
- Raga Desi & Raga Gauri
