= Mangala Kapoor =

Indian Hindustani classical vocalist and academic

- Education: Banaras Hindu University
- Occupations: Hindustani classical vocalist; Academic
- Employer: Banaras Hindu University (1989–2019)
- Awards: Padma Shri (2026)

Mangala Kapoor is an Indian Hindustani classical vocalist who taught music at Banaras Hindu University (BHU) in Varanasi from 1989 to 2019. She is also known as "Kashi ki Lata". In 2026 she was awarded the Padma Shri in the category of literature and education. Kapoor survived an acid attack in 1965, and the 2025 Marathi-language film Mangla is based on her life.

== Early life ==
Kapoor grew up in Varanasi, the only daughter among three children. In 1965, when she was 11 or 12 years old, she was injured in an acid attack. She underwent 37 surgeries and spent about six years recovering at home and in hospital. Her father steered her towards music after hearing her sing at home, and she enrolled at a music school.

== Career ==
Kapoor studied music at BHU, where she earned a bachelor's degree, a master's degree and a PhD. She trained in the Gwalior gharana. In 1989 she joined the vocal music department of the university's Mahila Mahavidyalaya, where she taught until retiring in 2019. She also performed at public events during this period.

Her autobiography, Seerat, was published in 2018, and she has written several other books on music. She trains women who have survived acid attacks, works with organisations that support them, and runs free classes for underprivileged children. Mangla, a Marathi-language biographical film about her life directed by Aparana Hosing, was released in 2025.

== Recognition ==
Tarang, an organisation, gave Kapoor the title "Kashi ki Lata" ("Lata of Kashi") in 1982. The Government of India announced her as a Padma Shri recipient in January 2026, and she received the award at Rashtrapati Bhavan on 23 June 2026.
