= Gwalior gharana =

Genre in Hindustani classical music

The Gwalior Gharana (Gwalior School of Classical Music) is the first and the most influential khayal and drupad gharana of Hindustani classical music in the Indian subcontinent. It is known as the oldest musical gharana.The Gwalior Gharana is known as the "Gangotri" (origin) of khayal raga and is considered the most ancient school of Hindustani classical music. Other gharanas follow the lineage of the Gwalior Gharana.

It was first established as an illustrious Dhrupad school of music in 15th century by Maharaja Man Singh Tomar, early patrons and members includes musicians:- Jagannath Kaviral, Gopala, Baiju Bawra, Haridas, Nayaka Baksu or Bacchu, Tansen, Mohamud Lohang, Dhaundhi and Bhagwant.

Later, Dhrupad school of music became the Gwalior Gharana and reached it zenith in the 16th century with the reign of the Mughal emperor Akbar (1542–1605).

The famous singers of this patron of the arts were Naththan Khan, Naththan Pir Bakhsh and his grandsons Haddu Khan, Hassu Khan and Natthu Khan. The head musician in the imperial court was Bade Mohammad Khan, who was famous for his taan bazi style

Miyan Tansen, who was the most famous vocalist at the court of Akbar, came from the melodic city of Gwalior.

Additionally, Swami Haridasa, Baiju Bawra, Nayaka Baksu, Jagganath Kavirai and many other celebrated musicians and singers were inhabitants of Gwalior city making it the capital of Hindustani Classical Music.

== History ==
The Gwalior Gharana evolved during the time of the Mughal Empire (1526CE – 1857 CE). In late 16th century among the early masters (ustad) were Naththan Khan, Naththan Pir Bakhsh and his grandsons Haddu, Hassu and Natthu Khan. The head musician in the imperial court was Bade Mohammad Khan, who was famous for his taan bazi style. Both Bade Mohammad Khan and Naththan Pir Bakhsh belonged to the same tradition of Shahi Sadarang (also known as Nemat Khan, dhrupad singer and veena player in the court of Mohammad Shah (1702 CE – 1748 CE).

Hassu Khan (died 1859 CE) and Haddu Khan (died 1875 CE) continued to develop the Gwalior style of singing. Haddu Khan's son Ustad Bade Inayat Hussain Khan (1852 – 1922) was also a singer but his style departed from the methodical Gwalior style.

Among the brothers' students were Vasudeva Buwa Joshi (died 1890), who became a teacher; and Ramkrishna Deva, who became a musician in Dhar. It was Ramkrishna Deva's student, Balakrishnabuwa Ichalkaranjikar (1849 – 1926) who brought the Gwaliori gaeki (singing style) to Maharashtra state.

Another prominent disciple of the duo was a Muslim dhrupad and dhamar singer from Amritsar, Miyan Banney Khan. He introduced Khyal in Punjab and Sindh and then took a musical position at the court of Nizam of Hyderabad. Miyan Banney Khan's pupils included his cousin, Amir Khan (also known as "Meeran Bukhsh Khan"), Gamman Khan, Bhai Atta Muhammad, Ali Baksh Khan (father of Ustad Bade Ghulam Ali Khan), Kale Khan, Mian Qadir(sarangi), Bhai Wadhawa, Bhai Wasawa, Baba Rehman Baksh.

These disciples started their own gharanas and their descendants are still highly regarded Hindustani musicians of the subcontinent. Amir Khan also shared Miyan Banney khan's cheejs with the pupils of Balkrishnabuwa Ichalkaranjikar when he stayed in Miraj for sometime. However, his disciples included among others his four sons. One of the sons, Pyare Khan, became a professional musician. Another son, Baba Sindhe Khan (1885 – 18 June 1950) became a music teacher and trained pupils such as the educator B. R. Deodhar (1901 – 1990); the singer Bade Ghulam Ali Khan (1902 – 1968), and Farida Khanam (born 1935).

On 19 August 1922, Pyare Khan performed at the second annual celebration of the independence of Afghanistan. He became a mentor to a singer from Afghanistan, also performing at the celebration. This was the singer, Qasim Afghan ("Qasimju") (born 1878, Kabul). Pyare Khan also remained a musician at the court of Maharajadhiraj Maharawal (Sir Jawahir Singh) of Jaisalmer (1914 – 1949). He was also a teacher of Seth Vishandas of Hyderabad in Sindh near Karachi and Mahant Girdharidas of Bhuman Shah, Punjab.

Mian Pyare Khan's sons were Ustad Umeed Ali Khan (1910 – 1979) and Ustad Ghulam Rasool Khan. They became respected classical vocalists of their times. Ustad Ghulam Rasool Khan had two sons, Ustad Hameed Ali Khan and Ustad Fateh Ali Khan. Ustad Fateh Ali Khan's son is Izat Fateh Ali Khan.

Krishnarao Shankar Pandit (1893 – 1989) was a musician of the Gwalior gharana heritage. His father, Shankarrao Pandit was a student of Haddu Khan, Nathu Khan and Nissar Hussain Khan, Nathu Khan's son. Krishnarao Shankar Pandit practiced Khayal, Tappa and Tarana singing as well as layakari.

In 1914, Krishnarao Shankar Pandit opened a school in Gwalior, the Shankar Gandharva Mahavidyalaya. In 1921, he was awarded the title Gayak Shiromani at the All India Congress. Pandit became the court musician to Madhavrao Scindia of Gwalior; the State Musician of Maharashtra, an emeritus professor at Madhav Music College, Gwalior and an emeritus producer at All India Radio and Doordarshan. For his contribution to the world of classical music, he received awards including the Padma Bhushan in 1973 and the Tansen Award in 1980.

The students of Krishnarao Shankar Pandit included his son, Laxman Krishnarao Pandit, Sharadchandra Arolkar, Balasaheb Poochwale, and his granddaughter Meeta Pandit.

== Pedagogical genealogy ==
The following map is based on accounts that Makkan Khan and Shakkar Khan were not related. These accounts are supported by research indicating that Makkan Khan's descendants were dhrupadiyas and Shakkar Khan's descendants were khayaliyas, thus reflecting different genealogies.

=== Ancestral pedagogy ===
Lucknow; Gharana; Guru; Parampara
Ghulam; Rasool
Makkhan; Khan
Nathan Peer Baksh (progenitor)
Kadar; Baksh; Khan
Ghagge Khuda; Baksh	Natthu Khan	Haddu Khan (founder)	Hassu Khan (founder)	Masid; Khan (wrestler)
Agra Gharana; Parampara	Gule; Imam; Khan
Vishnupant; Chattre	Banne; Khan	Chhote; Mohammed; Khan	Vasudevbuwa; Joshi "Joshibuwa"	Ramkrishnadev; Paranjpe "Devjibuwa"	Jilaye; Khan (daughter)
Mehendi; Hussain; Khan
Faiz Mohammed; Khan	Bade Nissar; Hussain Khan	Rahimat; Khan "Bhu Gandharva"	Bade Inayat; Hussain Khan	Inayat Hussain; Khan	Ghagge; Nazir; Khan
Meeran Baksh "Amir" Khan	Ali Baksh & Fateh Ali Khan "Aliya-Fatu"	Rampur-Sahaswan; Gharana Parampara	Mewati Gharana; Parampara	Balakrishnabuwa; Ichalkaranjikar
Shankar; Pandit	Eknath "Mao"; Pandit	Patiala Gharana; Parampara
Bhaskarbuwa; Bakhale "Dev Gandharva"	Qurban Hussain; Khan	Vishnu Digambar; Paluskar	Anant Manohar; Joshi	Nilkanthbuwa; Jangam; Alurmath	Abdul; Karim; Khan
Raja Bhaiya; Poonchwale	Pyare; Khan	Ganpatibuwa; Ichalkaranjikar	Yashwant Sadashiv; Mirashibuwa
Ramkrishnabuwa; Vaze	Krishnarao Shankar; Pandit	"Baba"; Sindhe; Khan	Kirana; Gharana; Parampara

== Style ==
=== Ashtanga Gayaki ===
This gharana is known for adhering to what is described as the "ashtangi gayaki," a systematic aesthetic framework of eight elements to approach vocalization. The eight elements of ashtanga gayaki include:

- Alap (includes bol alap)
- Behlava (includes layakari)
- Taan (includes bol taan)
- Kampan
- Meend
- Gamaka
- Khatka
- Murki

Each body has distinct subvarieties, but meend and behlava are considered the most important.

=== Aesthetics ===
This gharana is known for its commitment to simplicity. Often, musicians of this tradition opt for siddha and well-known ragas rather than aprachalita and obscure ones.

==== Format ====
Musicians of this tradition opt for taans that are sapaat (straight) rather than vakra (zig-zag). This tradition emphasizes vistara (melodic expansion) and alankara (melodic ornamentation) to develop the raga presentation.

==== Tempo ====
This tradition does not employ the extra slow tempo alap that other traditions (like Kirana) are known for.

Vilambit khayals are still rendered relatively briskly, rarely below 30 bpm. For Gwalior khayaliyas, the bandish (composition) is key as it provides the melody of the raga and indications on its performance. While doing bol-baant (rhythmic play using the words of the bandish) the Gwalior style uses all the words of sthayi or antara in proper sequence, without disturbing their meaning.

The behlava is a medium tempo rendition of the notes which follows the pattern of the aroha (ascent) and the avaroha(descent) of the raga. The behlava is divided into the asthayi (notes from Ma to Sa) and the antara (noted from Ma, Pa, or Dha to Pa of the higher register). The asthayi section is sung twice before the antara. Then follows a swar-vistara in a medium tempo using heavy meends (glides) and taans. The dugun-ka-alap follows in which groups of two or four note combinations are sung in quicker succession while the basic tempo remains the same. The bol-alap is the next part where the words of the text are sung in different ways. Then there is in faster tempo the murki where notes are sung with ornamentation. The bol-taans have melodic sequences set to the words of the bandish. The other taans, including the gamak, follow.

The sapat taan is important to the Gwalior style. It is the singing of notes in a straight sequence and at a vilambit pace. Both dhrupad and khayal singing evolved in Gwalior and there are many overlaps. In the khyal style there is one form, Mundi Dhrupad, that incorporates all the features of dhrupad singing but without the Mukhda.

== Exponents ==
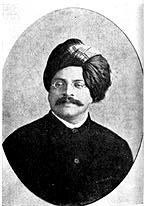
Vishnu Digambar Paluskar (1872 – 1931) founded the Gandharva school in 1901.

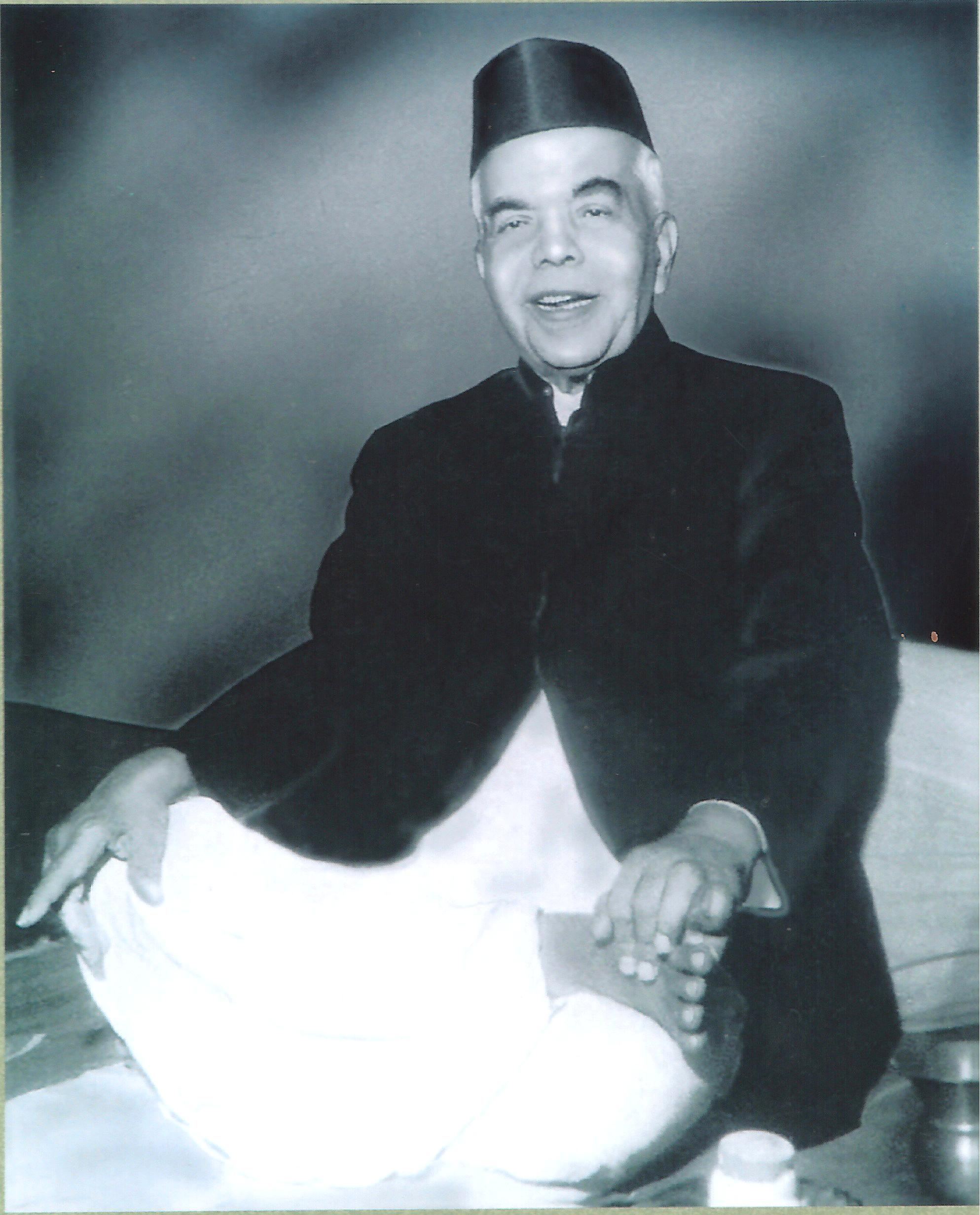
Gururao Deshpande - (1889 – 1982)

=== 19th Century and Earlier ===
- Babasaheb Dixit, disciple of Hassu Khan.
- Vishnupant Chattre (1840 – 1905), disciple of Haddu Khan.
- Faiz Mohammed Khan (died 1920), disciple of Kadar Khan.
- Bade Inayat Hussain Khan (1840 – 1923), son of Ustad Haddu Khan Saheb
- Balakrishnabuwa Ichalkaranjikar (1849 – 1926), disciple of Vasudevbuwa Joshi, Devjibuwa, and Chote Mohammed Khan.
- Bhaiyyasaheb Ganpatrao (1852 – 1920), disciple of Bande Ali Khan and Inayat Hussain Khan.
- Vishnu Digambar Paluskar (1872 – 1931), disciple of Balkrishnabuwa Ichalkaranjikar.
- Vishnu Keshav Utturkar (c. 1880 – c. 1940), disciple of Neelkanthbuwa Alurmath.

=== 20th Century ===
- Ramkrishnabuwa Vaze (1871 – 1945), disciple of Bade Nissar Hussain Khan.
- Anant Manohar Joshi (1881 – 1967), disciple of Balakrishnabuwa Ichalkaranjikar, received Sangeet Natak Akademi Award (1955).
- Raja Bhaiya Poonchwale (1882 – 1956), disciple of Balakrishnabuwa Ichalkaranjikar
- Yashwant Sadashiv Mirashibuwa (1883 – 1966), disciple of Balakrishnabuwa Ichalkaranjikar.
- Krishnarao Shankar Pandit (1894 – 1989), disciple of Shankar Pandit
- Sharadchandra Arolkar (1912 – 1994), disciple of Krishnarao Shankar Pandit, Eknath Pandit and Krishnarao Mule (Beenkar)
- Omkarnath Thakur (1897 – 1967), disciple of Vishnu Digambar Paluskar.
- Lal Mohammad Khan (died 1962), son and disciple of Ata Muhammad Khan.
- Vinayakrao Patwardhan (1898 – 1975), disciple of Vishnu Digambar Paluskar and Ramkrishnabuwa Vaze, awarded Padma Bhushan (1972).
- Rajarambuwa Paradkar (1899 – 1975), disciple of Yashwantrao Mirashibuwa.
- B. R. Deodhar (1901 – 1990), disciple of Balakrishnabuwa Ichalkaranjikar, Vishnu Digambar Paluskar, Abdul Karim Khan, and Vinayakrao Patwardhan, received Sangeet Natak Akademi Fellowship (1964) and Padma Shri (1976).
- Shankarrao Sapre, disciple of Vishnu Digambar Paluskar who founded Shriram Sangeet Vidyalaya at Nagpur in 1926.
- Deenanath Mangeshkar (1900 – 1942), disciple of Ramkrishnabuwa Vaze.
- Qurban Hussain Khan (1901 – 1970), son and disciple of Bade Inayat Hussain Khan.
- Narayanrao Vyas (1902 – 1984), disciple of Vishnu Digambar Paluskar, received Sangeet Natak Akademi Award (1976).
- Balwantrai Bhatt (1921 – 2016), disciple of Omkarnath Thakur.
- Dattatreya Vishnu Paluskar (1921 – 1955), son of Vishnu Digambar Paluskar who learned from Mirashibuwa, Narayanrao Vyas, and Vinayakrao Patwardhan.
- Manzoor Ali Khan (1922 – 1980), son and disciple of Jamalo Khan who also learned from Seendo Khan.
- Kumar Gandharva (1924 – 1992), disciple of B. R. Deodhar.
- Gajananbuwa Joshi (1911 – 1987), son and disciple of Anant Manohar Joshi. Also learned from Vilayat Hussain Khan of Agra gharana and Bhurji Khan of Jaipur-Atrauli gharana.
- Vinayakbuva Utturkar (Joshi) (1914 – 1989), disciple of father Vishnu Utturkar and Yashwantrao Mirashibuwa.
- Ghulam Hassan Shaggan (1928 – 2015), disciple of Bhai Lal Muhammad.
- Vasundhara Komkali (1931 – 2015), wife and disciple of Kumar Gandharva.
- Narayanrao Bodas (1933 – 2017), son and disciple of Laxmanrao Bodas. Also learned from Pralhad Ganu.
- Sunanda Patnaik (1934 – 2020), disciple of Vinayakrao Patwardhan.
- Ashok Ranade (1937 – 2011), disciple of B. R. Deodhar, Gajananrao Joshi, and Laxman Bodas. Also learned from Pralhad Ganu of Agra gharana.
- Malini Rajurkar (1941 – 2023), disciple of Govindrao Rajurkar, awarded Sangeet Natak Akademi award.
- Veena Sahasrabuddhe (1948 – 2016), daughter and disciple of Shankar Bodas, also learned from elder brother Kashinath, Gajananrao Joshi, Balwantrai Bhatt.
- Kedar Bodas (b. c. 1963 – 2023), son and disciple of Narayanrao Bodas. Also learned from Ashok Ranade.

=== Contemporary artists ===
- Laxman Krishnarao Pandit (born 1934), son and disciple of Krishnarao Shankar Pandit, awarded Sangeet Natak Akademi Award and Sangeet Natak Akademi Fellowship- Tagore Ratna.
- Neela Bhagwat (1942–2026), disciple of Sharadchandra Arolkar and Jal Balporia.
- Iqbal Hussain Khan (1942 – 2010), son and disciple of Qurban Hussain Khan.
- Arun Kashalkar (born 1943), disciple of Gajananrao Joshi. Also learned from Ram Marathe, D. V. Panke, Rajabhau Kogje, and Babanrao Haldankar.
- Vidyadhar Vyas (born 1944), son and disciple of Narayanrao Vyas.
- Fateh Ali Khan (born 1948), son and disciple of Ghulam Rasool Khan.
- Vikas Kashalkar (born 1950), disciple of Gajananrao Joshi.
- Ulhas Kashalkar (born 1955), disciple of Gajananrao Joshi. Also learned from Ram Marathe of Agra gharana.
- Meeta Pandit (born 1974), daughter and disciple of Laxman Krishnarao Pandit. Also learned from grandfather, Krishnarao Shankar Pandit.
- Shashwati Mandal (born 1973), disciple of Balasaheb Poonchwale.
- Manjusha Kulkarni-Patil (born 1971), disciple of D. V. Kanebuwa and Ulhas Kashalkar.
- Apoorva Gokhale (born 1973), disciple of grandfather Gajananrao Joshi, uncles Madhukar Joshi and Manohar Joshi, as well as Sucheta Bidkar and Arun Kashalkar. Also learned from Ashwini Bhide-Deshpande.
- Pallavi Joshi (born 1980), disciple of grandfather Gajananrao Joshi, uncle Madhukar Joshi, father Manohar Joshi, Sucheta Bidkar, and Arun Kashalkar.
- Ateeq Hussain Khan (born 1980), son and disciple of Iqbal Hussain Khan.
- Izat Fateh Ali Khan, son of Fateh Ali Khan.
