= Narayanrao Bodas =

Indian classical singer

- Born: 31 January 1933; Karachi, British India
- Died: 27 November 2017 (aged 84) Pune, Maharashtra, India
- Genre: Indian classical music
- Occupations: Hindustani Classical, Natyasangeet
- Years active: 1960–2010

Narayanrao Bodas (नारायणराव बोडस) was an Indian classical vocalist from Maharashtra, belonging to the Gwalior gharana (singing style). He was also a leading vocalist of Marathi stage drama.

== Plays acted ==
- Soubhagyarama सौभाग्यरमा
- Sangeet Sharda संगीत शारदा
- Sangeet Saubhadram संगीत सौभद्रम्
- Mrichakatika मृच्छकटिक
- Sangeet Mruchchakatik सं. मृच्छकटिक
- Pati gele ga kathewadi पती गेले गं काठेवाडी
- Buddha jithe harla बुद्ध तिथे हरला
- Sangeet Mahashweta सं. महाश्वेता
- Sangeet Manapman संगीत मानापमान
- Sangeet Swayamvar सं. स्वयंवर
- Sangeet Saubhadra सं. सौभद्र
- Sangeet Samshay kallol सं. संशयकल्लोळ
- Dhadila Ramtine ka vani? धाडिला राम तिने का वनी?
- Sunder mi honar सुंदर मी होणार
- Sangeet Mandarmala मंदारमाला
- Sangeet Suvarnatula सुवर्णतुला
- Bawankhani बावनखणी
- Sant gora Kumbhar संत गोरा कुंभार
- Lahanpan dega deva लहानपण देगा देवा
- Dev dinaghari dhavla देव दीनाघरी धावला
- To ek rajhans तो एक राजहंस
- Krushnarjunyuddha कृष्णार्जुनयुद्ध

== Personal life ==
A revered alumnus of Akhil Bharatiya Gandharva Mahavidyalaya Mandal & eminent vocalist of Gwalior gharana, Pt. Narayanrao Bodas, a master of classical music, was inspired by his father's teachings and dedicated to preserving its essence. He was deeply influenced by the thought and musical vision of Pt. Paluskar.

Narayanrao was survived by his family, including son Kedar Bodas, who was also a singer from the Gwalior gharana.

== Illness and death ==
Bodas died on 27 November 2017 at 7:40 am due to old age, at his home in Pune.

== Awards and recognitions ==
- Maharashtra State Government - Balgandharva award
