= Ulhas Kashalkar =

Pandit Ulhas Kashalkar
- Born: 14 January 1955 (age 71)
- Occupation: Classical Vocalist
- Years active: 1965 – present
- Awards: Padma Shri (2010); Sangeet Natak Akademi Award (2008)
- Musical career
- Origin: Nagpur, India
- Genres: Hindustani classical music, Jaipur Gharana
- Website: Ulhas Kashalkar Official Website

Pandit Ulhas Kashalkar (born 14 January 1955) is an Indian Hindustani classical vocalist. He has received training in the Gwalior, Jaipur and Agra gharanas, and is considered one of the finest representative of all three schools.

== Early life ==
Ulhas was born in Nagpur. He received his first lessons in music from his father N D Kashalkar, a lawyer by profession and an amateur vocalist and musicologist. He went on to study music at Nagpur University, topping his post-graduate class. Around that time, he trained under Rajabhau Kogje and P N Khardenavis.

Indian music is heavily influenced by the Guru-shishya tradition. Kashalkar studied principally under Ram Marathe and Gajananrao Joshi.

== Career ==
Ulhas Kashalkar initially worked as a programme executive at the Mumbai station of All India Radio. In 1993 he became a teacher at the ITC Sangeet Research Academy, where he remains today.

Both Rambhau and Gajananrao were traditionalists which finds reflection in Kashalkar's vocalism. He possesses the ability to switch between three styles (namely Gwalior, Jaipur and Agra), at times even in the course of a single performance. He adheres to the aesthetic contours of each individual style, and also to the formal demands of the raga being presented. He is noted for his authentic presentations of obscure traditional ragas.

In an uncharacteristically expansive passage, the veteran music critic Prakash Wadhera once noted, "Ulhas is a fabulous vocalist, still in his middle years and young, who has an old musical head stuffed with innumerable current and rare ragas and compositions. Like a computer he never errs in any raga or composition howsoever intertwined or tricky it may be. He, just seems to press one key and out comes a raga in the true Jaipur colours, another to obtain a melody attired in the Agra style and still another to get a raga in the Gwalior habiliments. One can only imagine Kashalkar's questionless loyalty to his various gurus, and his own prodigious capacity to assimilate and consolidate the incoming knowledge."

== Awards ==
- Sangeet Natak Akademi Award, 2008 awarded in 2009
- Padma Shri in 2010
- Tansen Samman in 2017
- Pt. Omkarnath Thakur Award in 2019

== See also ==
- Vikas Kashalkar
- Arun Kashalkar
