= Anant Manohar Joshi =

- Children: Gajananrao Joshi

Pandit Anant Manohar Joshi (8 March 1881 – 12 September 1967), also known as Antubuwa Joshi, was an Indian vocalist of Khayal-genre of Hindustani classical music.

Pandit Antubuwa Joshi was born at Kinhai, near Aundh, in Satara district of Maharashtra, India. He studied under Gwalior gharana with Balakrishnabuwa Ichalkaranjikar.

His disciples include his son, Gajananrao Joshi, D.R.Nimbargi.

He was awarded Sangeet Natak Akademi Award in 1955, given by the Sangeet Natak Akademi, India's National Academy of Music, Dance & Drama.
