= Zohrabai =

Indian singer

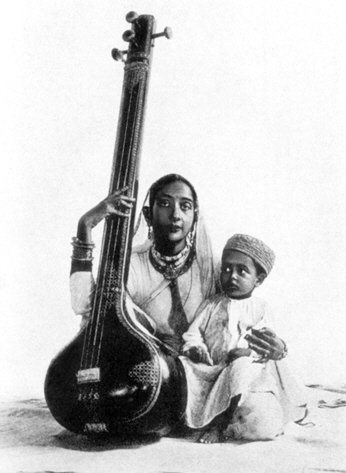
- Zohrabai Agrewali

Background information
- Born: 1868
- Origin: Agra, British Raj
- Died: 1913 (aged 45)
- Genres: Hindustani classical music, Agra gharana
- Occupation: Classical Vocalist
- Label: Gramophone Company of India

Zohrabai Agrewali (1868 – 1913), also known mononymously as Zohrabai, was one of the most noted and influential singers of Hindustani Classical Music from the early 1900s.

Along with Gauhar Jan, she marks the dying phase of the tawaif singing tradition in Indian classical music. Known for her masculine style of singing, she recorded several songs for the Gramophone Company of India.

== Early life and background ==
Zohrabai was born in 1868 in Agra, North-Western Provinces, British India. An exponent of the Agra gharana of the Hindustani Classical Music, she took on the surname Agrewali that translates to "from Agra". She was born into a musical family. Her mother was tawaif Hussaini Jan, her father was Sarangi player Ahmad Khan. She received professional musical training from her father from a young age. During the early years of her life, Zohrabai received training from Ustad Sher Khan, Ustad Kallan Khan and the noted composer Mehboob Khan (Daras Piya).

== Performing career ==
Zohrabai performed and recorded tracks from such forms of the Hindustani classical music as khayal as well as lighter varieties including thumri and ghazals which she learned from Ahmad Khan of Dhaka.

"Dadurwa Bolay Mor Shor Karat", recorded by Zohrabai in 1910.

Zoharabai's singing influenced Ustad Faiyaz Khan, the greatest name in the Agra Gharana in modern times, and even Ustad Bade Ghulam Ali Khan of the Patiala Gharana held her in high regard.

The Gramophone Company of India signed an exclusive contract with her in 1908 with a payment of Rs 2,500 per year for 25 songs. Zohrabai recorded over 60 songs during 1908–1911. In 1994, her 18 most famous songs were reissued on one audiotape followed by a compact disc in 2003.

Only a few short pieces by Zohrabai survive in the form of 78 rpm recordings; some of the notable tracks include the 1909 pieces "Matki More re Goras" in raga Jaunpuri and Dekhen ko Man Lalchay in raga (Sohini). A select few of the 78 rpm recordings were made available for streaming on Patrick Moutal's website.

== Death ==
Zohrabai died in 1913.
