= Agra gharana =

Type of Hindustani classical vocal music

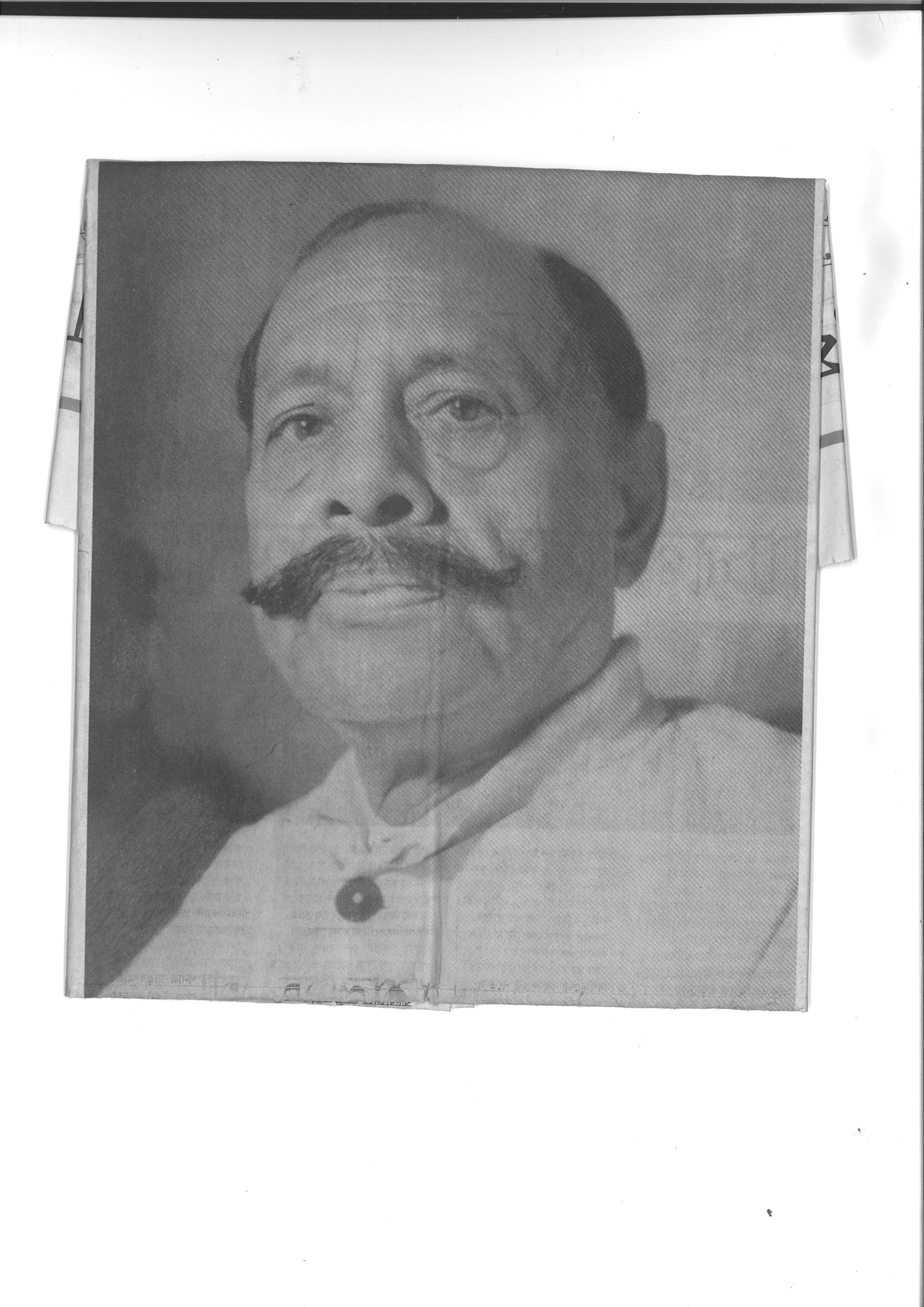
Portrait of Faiyaz Khan, the most well-known exponent of the Agra gharana.

A 1910 78 rpm recording of Zohrabai, an exponent of the Agra gharana.

The Agra Gharana is a tradition of Hindustani Classical music apprenticeship, heritage, and stylization associated with a family of musicians from Agra. The gharana is known primarily for vocal music due to the notability of exponents like Faiyaz Khan and Vilayat Hussain Khan in the first half of the 20th century.

Descended from the Nauharbani tradition of Dhrupad, Agra gharana was influenced by earlier traditions of khayal like Gwalior gharana and Rangile gharana. Musicians of the Agra gharana have shared close relations both socially and aesthetically with the Atrauli and Jaipur-Atrauli traditions.

Contemporary musicians representing the Agra gharana include Lalith J. Rao, Waseem Ahmed Khan, Bharathi Prathap, and Priya Purushothaman.

== Etymology ==
The Agra gharana takes its name from the city of Agra, which was the ancestral home of Vilayat Hussain Khan's family. Many musical families resided in Agra ancestrally, such as the Mewati and Etawah traditions, but Vilayat Hussain Khan's ancestors were more associated with the region amongst musicians.

== History ==
=== Classical era ===
Musicians of the Agra gharana claim descendence from the Nauharbani tradition of Dhrupad and legendary musician Nayak Gopal, a contemporary of Amir Khusrau. Nayak Gopal was acquired by Alauddin Khalji (1296 - 1316) as a court musician after the sack of Devgiri, around 1300 CE.

=== Medieval era ===
Musicians of the Agra gharana claim descendence from musician Haji Sujan Khan, a contemporary of legendary musician Tansen, who served at the court of the Mughal emperor Akbar in Delhi during the second half of the 16th century.

=== Modern era ===
Descendants of Haji Sujan Khan's family resettled in Agra after divestment from the arts by the Mughal Court of Aurangzeb.

One of his descendants, Ghagge Khuda Baksh, ill-reputed due to his rough ("ghagge") voice went outside the gharana to learn from Natthan Peer Baksh of the Gwalior tradition. He learned khayal from Peer Baksh. After returning to Agra with new musical repertoire and techniques from Gwalior, Khuda Baksh's impressive changes were embraced by his Agra peers. Agra gharana musicians claim Khuda Baksh introduced khayal into their tradition. Khuda Baksh later served at the Jaipur Court.

=== Contemporary era ===
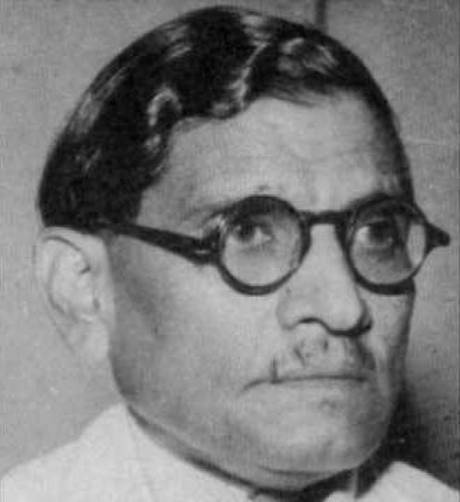
Portrait of Vilayat Hussain Khan, the most well-reputed teacher of the Agra gharana in modern times.

Sher Khan, the nephew and disciple of Ghagge Khuda Baksh, was the first musician to introduce the Agra style to Mumbai. The city soon became a hub for the Agra gharana. Like musicians of other gharanas in the city, members of the Agra gharana settled in the neighborhood between Gowalia Tank and Grant Road (South Mumbai, India) in South Mumbai. Notably, Agra gharana musicians lived at Ruby Mansion on Forjett Street until 2025.

A plaque in Mumbai's Andheri neighborhood comemmorates Agra gharana luminary Vilayat Hussain Khan.

== Pedagogical genealogy ==
The following maps are based on recorded accounts by Vilayat Hussain Khan and Yunus Hussain Khan.

=== Ancestral lineage ===
Gauharbani Guru; Parampara	Nayak Gopal
Swami; Haridas	Nauharbani Guru; Parampara	Kirana Gharana; Parampara
Miyan; Tansen	Lohang; Das	Alakh; Das	Khalak; Das	Malukh; Das
Daughter	Sujan; Singh	Bichitra; Khan
Surgyan; Khan
Qader Shah (Jogi Bacche)	Daughter
Hyder Shah	Wazir; Khan
Dayam Khan ("Saras-rang")	Hasan & Saiyad; Khan	Gwalior Gharana; Guru Parampara
Qayam Khan ("Sham-rang")	Faiz Mohammed; Khan (Barodewale)	Nathan Peer; Baksh	Rangile Gharana; Parampara
Junggu; Khan	Soosa; Khan	Gulab; Khan	Ghagge Khuda Baksh	Ramzan Khan Rangile
Sher; Khan	Mohammed; Khan	Ghulam Haider "Kallan" Khan	Ghulam Abbas; Khan	Mohammed Ali; Khan
Nisar Hussain "Natthan" Khan	Hydori Begum	Tassaduq Hussain Khan	Qadri Begum	Abbasi Begum	Safdar Hussain Khan
Faiyaz; Hussain Khan

== Overview ==
=== Philosophy ===
Haldankar claims that Agra, Jaipur-Atrauli, and Atrauli traditions share common facets. This include holding the "dignity" of the performance in "high esteem," giving "equal importance" to swara (notes) and laya (beats), developing the raga according to the "entire raga-rupa" (merukhand), and emphasizing akara "(full-throated voice)."

=== Technique ===
The gayaki (style of singing) of the Agra Gharana is a blend of khayal gayaki and dhrupad-dhamar. In training, both the khayal and dhrupad components run hand in hand and are not taught in an isolated fashion. This is obvious from the method of singing notes of the Agra Gharana which demands that the projection of voice be more forceful and voluminous than usually encountered in khayal gayaki, as well as uttering notes open and bare (without grace notes).

Most khayal performances by artists of Agra gharana commence with the nom-tom alaap, a tradition unique to the Agra gharana. Different facets of a raga are displayed with the help of bandish while the raga is elaborated using vistaar.

The gharana adopts a kind of voice production which relies on a flatter version of the vowel sound "a", which makes its music agreeable to rhythmic variations and is best suited for a deep masculine voice. Emphasis is laid on bold, full-throated and robust voice production, and singing in the lower register (mandra) is favoured. Keeping in tune with its dhrupadic origins, the singers use broad and powerful ornamentations (gamaks), extensive glides (meends) and resonant articulations of notes. As with the Gwalior gharana, the Agra singers accentuate the importance of the bandish and its methodical exposition. Singers following Faiyaz Khan's style resort to the dhrupadic nom-tom alaap before singing the bandish. The singers of this gharana are also great masters over layakari or the rhythmic component. In fact, layakari is the foundation on which the singers build the edifice of the bandish. Agra singers' tihais are eagerly awaited, as are their nifty ways of arriving at the same, by building up anticipation within the listener.

=== Repertoire ===
Haldankar claims that, like Jaipur-Atrauli and Atrauli traditions, Agra gharana has an extensive repertoire of rare ragas. Some of these include varieties of Nat, Bihag (raga), and Kanada (raga).

Musicians of the Agra gharana claim that to be the only tradition that still continues singing dhrupad-dhamar in addition to nom-tom alap, khayal, thumri, tappa, tarana, and hori. However, while many traditions also practice these classical composition types, Agra is esteemed for its version of nom-tom alap.

=== Criticism ===
Kumar Prasad Mukherjee, a scholar-musician trained in the Agra tradition, argued that Agra's approach to vocal music was comparatively complete, although his list of attributes to qualify the claim excludes many attributes practiced by other gharanas, such as sargam notable in Qawwal tradition-descended gharanas like Mewati and Patiala.

No other gayaki is so complete in all respects as the Agra gayaki. Agra gayaki presents all the eight angas, the ashtanga, of khayal gayaki. Vistaar or alap; nayaki of bandish, that is the manner in which the guru has imparted the composition to the disciple; gayaki anga of bandish, in other words the same bandish is rendered in a different manner after the nayaki ang has been sung with the help of the singer's own imagination. This is followed by Behelava which, no doubt, is imported from Gwalior. This is followed by Bol-bant , taken from dhamar, followed by Bol-tanas, which is the singular contribution of the Agra gharana. This is followed by druta khayals, Bol-banana (music), bol-tanas, and tanas.

— Kumar Prasad Mukherjee, Agra Gharana (2000)

Babanrao Haldankar, a scholar-musician trained in the Agra and Jaipur-Atrauli traditions, addressed criticism that Agra gayaki over-empasizes layakari, is indifferent to tunefulness, discourages kana swara, is too forceful stylistically, and discourages sargam.

== Exponents ==
=== 16th Century ===
- Haji Sujan Khan, son and disciple of Alakh Das and court musician of Mughal emperor Akbar

=== 17th Century ===
- Surgyan Khan, son and disciple of Haji Sujan Khan and court musician of Akbar
- Qader Shah and Hyder Shah (alias "Jogi Bacche" and "Gond Puriye"), sons and disciples of Surgyan Khan and court musicians of Mughal emperor Jahangir

=== 18th Century ===
- Dayam Khan Nauhar "Saras-rang", disciple of Hyder Shah
- Qayam Khan "Shyam-rang", son and disciple of Dayam Khan Nauhar

=== 19th Century ===
- Junghu Khan (1781—1852), son and disciple of Qayam Khan
- Soosu Khan, son and disciple of Qayam Khan
- Gulab Khan, son and disciple of Qayam Khan
- Ghagge Khuda Baksh, alias Husain Gawaiye (1790—1880), son and disciple of Qayam Khan. Also learned from Natthan Peer Baksh of Gwalior gharana.
- Sher Khan (1805—1862), son and disciple of Junghu Khan
- Natthan Khan (1840—1901), son and disciple of Sher Khan
- Ghulam Abbas Khan (Agrawale) (1825—1934), son and disciple of Ghagge Khuda Baksh
- Kallan Khan (1835—1925), son and disciple of Ghagge Khuda Baksh
- Mohammed Khan (Agrawale) (1870—1922), son and disciple of Natthan Khan
- Abdullah Khan "Manhar-piya" (1873—1920), son and disciple of Natthan Khan
- Mohammed Siddique (d. 1917), son and disciple of Natthan Khan
- Tasadduq Hussain Khan "Vinod-piya" (1879—1946), son and disciple of Kallan Khan

=== 20th Century ===
- Zohrabai (1868—1913), disciple of Sher Khan and Kallan Khan
- Bhaskarbuwa Bakhale (1869—1922), disciple of Natthan Khan
- Altaf Hussain Khan (1873—1964), son and disciple of Zahoor Khan (Khurjawale) of Khurja gharana. Son-in-law and disciple of Natthan Khan.
- Faiyaz Khan "Prem-piya" (1886—1950), son and disciple of
- Vilayat Hussain Khan "Pran-piya" (1895—1962), son and disciple of Natthan Khan
- Babu Khan (Agrawale) (1897—1933), son and disciple of Natthan Khan
- Ata Hussain Khan "Ratan-piya" (1898—1980), son and disciple of Mehboob Khan "Darasa-piya". Also learned from brother-in-law Faiyaz Khan
- Nanhe Khan (Agrawale) (1899—1945), son and disciple of Natthan Khan
- Ghulam Rasool Khan, son and disciple of Kale Khan "Sarasa-piya"
- Ghulam Nabi Khan, son and disciple of Kale Khan "Sarasa-piya"
- S. N. Ratanjankar "Sujan" (1899—1974), disciple of Faiyaz Khan
- Dilip Chandra Vedi "Vedi / Nada-rang" (1901-1992), disciple of Bhaskarbuwa Bakhale and Faiyaz Khan
- Bashir Khan (Agrawale) (1903—1960), son and disciple of Mohammed Khan
- Swami Vallabhdas (1904—1972), disciple of Ata Hussain Khan and Faiyaz Khan
- Jagannathbuwa Purohit "Guni-das" (1904—1968), disciple of Vilayat Hussain Khan
- Khadim Hussain Khan "Sajan-piya" (1907—1993), son and disciple of Altaf Hussain Khan, also learned from Kallan Khan
- Anwar Hussain Khan "Rasa-rang" (1910—1966), son and disciple of Altaf Hussain Khan, also learned from Kallan Khan
- Ramarao V. Naik (1909—1998), disciple of Swami Vallabhdas and Ata Hussain Khan
- Gajananrao Joshi (1911-1987), disciple of Vilayat Hussain Khan
- Azmat Hussain Khan "Dil-rang" (1911-1975), married sister of Vilayat Hussain Khan; more associated with Khurja gharana
- Dhruvatara Joshi "Prem-rang" (1912—1993), disciple of Faiyaz Khan
- Jyotsna Bhole (1914—2001), disciple of Khadim Hussain Khan
- Sumati Mutatkar (1916—2007), disciple of S. N. Ratanjankar and Vilayat Hussain Khan
- Sunil Bose (1916—2007), disciple of Ata Hussain Khan
- S. C. R. Bhat (1919—2008), disciple of S. N. Ratanjankar
- Chidanand Nagarkar (1919—1971), disciple of S. N. Ratanjankar
- Sharda Mukherjee (1919—2007), disciple of Khadim Hussain Khan
- Latafat Hussain Khan "Prem-das" (1920—1986), son and disciple of Altaf Hussain Khan
- Yusuf Hussain Khan (1922—1945), son and disciple of Vilayat Hussain Khan
- Dipali Nag (1922—2009), disciple of Tasadduq Hussain Khan, Bashir Khan, and Faiyaz Khan
- Aparna Chakravarti (1923—2007), disciple of Bashir Khan
- Ram Marathe (1924-1989), disciple of Vilayat Hussain Khan and Jagannathbuwa Purohit
- C. R. Vyas (1924—2002), disciple of Jagannathbuwa Purohit
- K. G. Ginde "Sujan-Sut" (1925—1994), disciple of S. N. Ratanjankar
- Suresh Haldankar (1926—2000), disciple of Jagannathbuwa Purohit
- Manik Varma (1926—1996), disciple of Jagannathbuwa Purohit
- Yunus Hussain Khan "Darpan" (1927—1991), son and disciple of Vilayat Hussain Khan
- Shrikrishna "Babanrao" Haldankar "Raspiya" (1927–2016)
- Dinkar Kaikini "Dina-rang" (1927—2010), disciple of S. N. Ratanjankar
- Lalita Ubhayakar (1928-2012), disciple of Ramarao V. Naik
- Yeshwantbuwa Joshi (1928—2012), disciple of Jagannathbuwa Purohit
- Anjanibai Lolekar (b. 1928), disciple of Anwar Hussain Khan
- Vasantrao Kulkarni, disciple of Jagannathbuwa Purohit
- Jitendra Abhisheki (1929—1998), disciple of Jagannathbuwa Purohit
- Yakub Hussain Khan, son and disciple of Vilayat Hussain Khan
- Khurshid Hussain Khan, son and disciple of Vilayat Hussain Khan
- Amanat Ali Khan Agrawale, son and disciple of Nanhe Khan Agrawale
- Mubarak Ali Khan Agrawale, son and disciple of Nanhe Khan Agrawale
- Vatsala Kumthekar, disciple of Khadim Hussain Khan
- Krishna Udyavarkar, disciple of Khadim Hussain Khan
- Saguna Kalyanpur, disciple of Khadim Hussain Khan
- Sharafat Hussain Khan "Prem-das" (1930—1985), disciple of his uncles, Faiyaz Khan, Ata Hussain Khan, and Vilayat Hussain Khan
- Vijay Kichlu (1930—2023), disciple of Latafat Hussain Khan
- Ravi Kichlu (1932—1993), disciple of Latafat Hussain Khan
- Aqeel Ahmed Khan "Mohan-piya" (1933—2014), son and disciple of Bashir Khan
- Shabbir Ahmed Khan, son and disciple of Bashir Khan
- Yashwant Mahale "Sujan-das" (b. 1935), disciple of S. C. R. Bhat, K. G. Ginde, and Dinkar Kaikini
- Indudhar Nirody (b. 1935), disciple of S. C. R. Bhat, K. G. Ginde, and Dinkar Kaikini
- Purnima Sen (b. 1937), disciple of Vilayat Hussain Khan, Ata Hussain Khan, and Sharafat Hussain Khan
- Yashpaul "Sagun-piya" (1937—2023), disciple of Vilayat Hussain Khan and Yunus Hussain Khan
- Ghulam Ahmed Khan, son and disciple of Ghulam Rasool Khan
- Saeed Ahmed Khan, son and disciple of Ghulam Rasool Khan
- Shamim Ahmed Khan (1938—2012), son and disciple of Ghulam Rasool Khan
- Naseem Ahmed Khan, son and disciple of Bashir Khan Agrawale
- Lalith J. Rao (1942-2026), disciple of Khadim Hussain Khan
- Arun Kashalkar "Rasa-das" (b. 1943), disciple of Ram Marathe and Babanrao Haldankar
- Sudhindra Bhaumik (b. 1946), disciple of Ramarao V. Naik, S. C. R. Bhat, K. G. Ginde, and Dinkar Kaikini
- Vikas Kashalkar (b. 1950), disciple of Gajananrao Joshi
- Ghulam Husnain Khan "Raja Miyan" (b. 1954), son and disciple of Anwar Hussain Khan
- Ulhas Kashalkar (b. 1955), disciple of Ram Marathe
- Subhra Guha (b. 1956), disciple of Vijay Kichlu, K. G. Ginde, and Dhruvtara Joshi
- Sanjay Marathe (1956—2024), son and disciple of Ram Marathe
- Nanhe Khan II, son and disciple of Ghulam Nabi Khan
- Talib Hussain Khan (d. 1978), son and disciple of Ghulam Nabi Khan
- Nasir Khan Agrawale, son and disciple of Ghulam Nabi Khan
- Mohsin Khan Niazi (1965—2020), son and disciple of Shamim Ahmed Khan

=== Contemporary exponents ===
- Shaukat Hussain Khan Niyazi
- Vajahat Hussain Khan (b. 1954), son and disciple of Azmat Hussain Khan
- Aditi Kaikini Upadhya (b. 1961), daughter and disciple of Dinkar Kaikini "Dila-rang" and Shashikala Kaikini
- Waseem Ahmed Khan (b. 1974), son and disciple of Naseem Ahmed Khan
- Bharathi Prathap, disciple of Ramarao V. Naik and Lalith J. Rao
- Priya Purushothman (b. 1981), disciple of Aditi Kaikini-Upadhya, Sudhindra Bhaumik, and Shashikala Kaikini
- Bhagyesh Marathe (b. 1991), disciple of Sanjay Marathe
- Mohammed Arsalaan Khan, son and disciple of Shaukat Hussain Khan Niyazi

== Bibliography ==
- Bonnie C. Wade (1984). "Agra gharana". Khyāl: Creativity Within North India's Classical Music Tradition. CUP Archive. pp. 101–129. ISBN 978-0-521-25659-9.
- Babanrao Haldankar; Padmaja Punde (2001). Aesthetics of Agra and Jaipur Traditions. Popular Prakashan. ISBN 978-81-7154-685-5.
- Tapasi Ghosh (2008). Pran Piya Ustad Vilayat Hussain Khan: His Life and Contribution to the World of Music. Atlantic Publishers & Dist. ISBN 978-81-269-0855-4.
