= Mirashi Buwa =

Indian singer

Yashwant Sadashiva Buwa, commonly referred as Mirashi Buwa (1883 – 5 January 1966), was an Indian classical singer in khyal-genre of Hindustani classical music. He was a noted disciple of Balakrishnabuwa Ichalkaranjikar (1849–1926) of Gwalior gharana, along with Vishnu Digambar Paluskar. He was known for his fast taans. He was also an actor and had performed in many of the Sangeet Nataks, Marathi theatre musicals.

== Biography ==
He was born in 1883 in Ichalkaranji in present Kolhapur district, Maharashtra. He worked with theatre company "Natyakala Pravartak Mandali" in Pune, from 1911 to 1932, and also taught music to numerous disciples.

In 1961, he was awarded the Sangeet Natak Akademi Award, given by the Sangeet Natak Akademi, India's National Academy of Music, Dance & Drama.

He died on 5 January 1966.

== Disciples ==
His notable disciples include Vinayakbuva Utturkar, Yeshawantbuwa Joshi, Pt. Bhalchandra Tryambak Ranade (Jabalpur) and Rajarambua Paradkar of Mumbai.
