= Jagannathbuwa Purohit =

Indian singer and teacher

Jagannathbuwa Purohit (12 March 1904 – 1968), also known as Pandit Gunidas, was a singer and a teacher of Hindustani classical music. He studied under Vilayat Hussain Khan of Agra Gharana. Buwa's colophon was 'Gunidas'.

== Agra Gharana ==
Buwa's was the oldest gharānā of the Mughal courts. His style is said to be authentic with a focus on correctness and precision. His origins were in Dhrupad-Dhamar gayaki.

== Legacy ==
His disciples include Jitendra Abhisheki, Pandit Ram Marathe, Pandit Vasantrao Kulkarni, C. R. Vyas, Suresh Haldankar, Pandit Yeshwantbuwa Joshi and Manik Varma. Tabla artist Pt Bhai (Suresh) Gaitonde, Farukhabad gharana, received his initial training from him.

Buwa was devoted to his teachers during a period when teachers were known to be whimsical. One of them praised him for his devotion and said, "You are a real Gun-das (worshiper of virtue)" and from this statement, he acquired his pen name Gunidas.

== Early life ==
He was born into a Karhade Brahmin family in the Nizam state of Hyderabad. He obtained his primary education in his mother tongue of Marathi. His musical talent was carefully nourished through an age old custom: living with one's teacher, or guru. This created a bond between teacher and disciple. In Hyderabad certain musicians were patronized by the ruler.

Jagannath chose many teachers to learn his trade. The custom was not to pay for tuition but rather to serve one's teacher.

He learned the Tabla, an Indian percussion instrument from Ustad Thirkawa, eventually becoming a Master. His musical training continued until he landed in the house of the Agra dynasty's major singer, Ustad Vilayat Husain Khan. He received excellent training and eventual admiration from Vilayat Khan. Jagannath was a fine vocalist and composer of Hindustani original themes, known as 'Cheej'.

== Career ==
After Indian independence, Jagannath's patronage income vanished and he was forced to move from city to city. He remained celibate.

One of his disciple from Pune said about Jagannath's musical philosophy:

Jagannath Buwa often told me that the basic requirement of music is that magical quality called “Rang” (literally: colour). As a quality in music, “Rang” transcends considerations of voice quality, grammar, and communication of 'rasa' (emotional content).

While in Mumbai, he was admired by music lovers and found generous supporters, including V V Gokhale and his younger brother, Va Va Gokhale of Dadar. He was a regular performer at Dadar-Matunga Music Club.

== Personal life ==
He died at Dombivli on a Diwali day in 1968. He was cremated at Dadar.

When he was given funds by well-wishers in 1962, India was engaged in a war with China. After the war ended, he contributed generously to the Relief Fund for soldiers.

== Legacy ==
A music festival named after him (Gunidas Sammelan) was started by his disciple, C R Vyas, in 1977 and is held every year in Mumbai as well as in other major Indian cities.
