= Narayanrao Vyas =

- Born: 1902
- Died: 1984 (aged 81–82)
- Genres: Hindustani
- Occupation: Singer

Narayanrao Vyas (1902–1984) was a Hindustani musician of Gwalior gharana. He was a disciple of Vishnu Digambar Paluskar. He cut several 78 rpm discs, classical khayals and semi-classical bhajans and thumris, at around 1930 which became very famous. His father and uncle were well-known musicians in Kolhapur. Narayanrao's elder brother, Shankarrao Vyas, was also a singer and composer of distinction.
