= B. R. Deodhar =

- Born: 11 September 1901; Miraj, Bombay Presidency, British India
- Died: 10 March 1990 (aged 88) Mumbai, Maharashtra
- Genre: Hindustani classical music
- Occupations: vocalist, musicologist, music educator
- Years active: 1920s–1980s

Professor B. R. Deodhar (11 September 1901 – 10 March 1990) was an Indian classical singer, musicologist and music educator. He was a vocalist of Khayal genre of Hindustani classical music.

He was awarded the 1964 Sangeet Natak Akademi Fellowship, the highest honour conferred by Sangeet Natak Akademi, India's National Academy for Music, Dance and Drama. In 1976, he was awarded the Padma Shri, by the Government of India.

== Early life and training ==
Deodhar was born in Miraj in present Sangli district of Maharashtra on 11 September 1901. He started his musical training with Nilkanth Buwa Alurmath, the guru bhai of noted singer and educator Vishnu Digambar Paluskar (1872–1931), and a disciple of Balakrishnabuwa Ichalkaranjikar of Gwalior gharana. Thereafter, he also received training under Abdul Karim Khan of Kirana gharana and Vinayakrao Patwardhan, another disciple of Paluskar. Later he joined the Gandharva Mahavidyalaya, where he became a leading disciple of Vishnu Digambar Paluskar, the founder of the institution. Deodhar was the only student of Paluskar who was allowed to also pursue formal education. Thus after matriculation he also pursued higher education and later received a B.A. degree. He also studied Western classical music.

In the coming years, he continued his musical education from leading musicians of various traditions including those from Agra gharana, Mohanrao Palekar from Jaipur Gharana, sarangi-player Majeed Khan, Inayat Khan, Ganpatrao Dewaskar, Pt. Sadashivbuwa Jadhav of Gokhale gharana, Shinde Khan of Talwandi gharana, binkaar Murad Khan of Indore gharana, and most importantly, Bade Ghulam Ali Khan of Patiala gharana, with whom he remained associated for many years, which had an important musical influence on his gayaki, singing style. Thus, he incorporate styles of several traditions, gharanas into his singing, and this also paved way for his career as a musicologist. In time, he also collected musical compositions, rare ragas from all the traditions he was associated with, through his career.

== Career ==
He established the Deodhar School of Music in Mumbai, breaking from the gharana tradition.

He also edited Hindi music monthly magazine, Sangeet Kala Vihar, and also published several books on music and musicians.

In 1964, he was awarded the Sangeet Natak Akademi Fellowship the highest honour conferred by Sangeet Natak Akademi, India's National Academy for Music, Dance and Drama. This was followed by Padma Shri, by Government of India in 1976.

Amongst his noted disciples, were singer Kumar Gandharva, Saraswati Rane, and Laxmi Ganesh Tewari. In 1993, his monthly columns, in Sangeet Kala Vihar, which included biographies of 19th-century Indian musicians, were published as book, Pillars of Hindustani music.

He died on 10 March 1990 in Mumbai.

== Works ==
- B. R. Deodhar (1993). Pillars of Hindustani music. Popular Prakashan. ISBN 978-81-7154-555-1.

== Bibliography ==
- Vaman Hari Deshpande (1 January 1989). Between Two Tanpuras. Popular Prakashan. pp. 166–172. ISBN 978-0-86132-226-8.
