= Raja Bhaiya Poonchwale =

Indian musician

Raja Bhaiya Poochwale (1882–1956) was an Indian musician from Poonch Gharana. Raja Bhaiya Poochwale also considered from Gwalior Gharana.

Raja Bhaiya was born on 12 August 1882 in Gwalior State of the Central India Agency. His birth name was Rao Radhalkishan Anand. His ancestors were Jagirdars of Elichpur in the district of Jhansi (Uttar Pradesh). He was famous for Taan-Malika, Sangeetopasna, Thumari, and Tarangini Dhrupad Dhamar-Gayan. He received the Sangeet Natak Akademi Award in 1956, and died in 1956.
