= Suresh Haldankar =

Indian classical singer and teacher (1926–2000)

Pandit Suresh Haldankar
- Born: 18 December 1926; Goa, Portuguese India
- Died: 17 January 2000 (aged 73); Mumbai, Maharashtra, India
- Other names: Maharashtra Gandharva
- Citizenship: Portuguese Empire (until 1961); Indian (from 1961)
- Occupations: Singer; actor; teacher

Pandit Suresh Haldankar (18 December 1926 - 17 January 2000) was an Indian classical singer, actor and teacher. His rise in the 1950s musical world of Bombay was dramatic but he failed to deliver on his promise and soon faded away from the mehfil platform. He spent the rest of his life as a teacher in a chawl in Bombay (now Mumbai). The music lovers in the Maharashtrian community still remembers him for the many immensely popular Natyageete records he cut.

== Background ==
Born in Goa to a Daivadnya family, Suresh Haldankar learned classical music from Jagannathbuwa Purohit, Ganpatrao Dewaskar and Manhar Barve.

== Career ==
Haldankar performed in Marathi Sangeet Natak musicals and acted alongside Bal Gandharva. His most memorable performance was in the musical Honaji Bala who was based on shahir Honaji Bala. Acharya Atre conferred upon him the title of "Maharashtra Gandharva" after listening to his singing in Shri Ranga Kamala Kanta. Among his other popular songs are Vithu maza lekur wala and Govinda re gopala.

He conducted Indian classical music classes at Dadar. Prabhakar Karekar is one of his notable students.
