= Ashok Ranade =

Indian musicologist (1937–2011)

Ashok Da. Ranade
- Born: 25 November 1937; Pune, Maharastra, India
- Died: 30 July 2011 (aged 73); Mumbai, Maharastra
- Other name: Ashok Da Ranade
- Occupation: Indian musicologist

Ashok Damodar Ranade (25 November 1937, in Pune – 30 July 2011, in Mumbai) was a scholar musician ( "chanteur et musicologue") and ethnomusicologist. Ranade was a vocalist trained in traditional Hindustani Art music. He was a composer constantly experimenting with new uncharted vistas. A pioneer of Cultural Musicology in India, Dr Ranade was a missionary who contributed in enriching India's cultural life in the 21st century.

== Education ==
Ranade was trained under Pt. Gajananrao Joshi of Gwalior, Jaipur, Agra Gharana (training period – 1948–58), Pt. Pralhad Ganu of Agra Gharana (training period – 1958–62), Pt. Laxmanrao Bodas of Gwalior Gharana (training period – 1962–66) and Prof. B. R. Deodher of Gwalior Gharana (training period – 1970–74). He also got lessons & insight for "Voice Culture" from Prof B R Deodhar.

Besides this musical training, Ranade had a strong academic background. He did LL.B. (University of Bombay, 1960), M.A. (Marathi, 1962 & English, 1964 – both from University of Bombay). He was awarded with title "Sangeetacharya" by Akhil Bharatiya Gandharva Mahavidyalaya Mandal, Bombay in 1976.

== Career ==
He was Founder Director of University Music Center, Bombay (now, Department of Music, University of Mumbai) and served during 1968 to 1983. He was instrumental in foundation of Archives and Research Center for Ethnomusicology for American Institute of Indian Studies at Pune and worked as associate director from 1983 to 1984. Later he was appointed as deputy director (Research, Theatre Development and Publications) at National Center for the Performing Arts from 1984 to 93.

== Academic work ==
He was one of the pioneer of ethnomusicology in India. His books in English and Marathi are considered to be most authentic and thoughtful sources of cultural musicology. His books Indology and Ethnomusicology: Contours of Early Indo-British Relationship (Promilla and Co., New Delhi, 1992), Essays in Indian Ethnomusicology (Munshiram Manoharlal, New Delhi, 1998), Perspectives on Music: Ideas and Theories (Promilla and Co. Publishers, New Delhi and Chicago, 20080 and Reflections on Musicology and History – With reference to Hindustani Music (Indian Musicological Society, Mumbai-Baroda, 2001) give insights in Indian ethnomusicology. In Keywords and Concepts in Hindustani Music and Music-Contexts: A Concise Dictionary of Hindustani Music, he has meticulously explained many terms and concepts in Hindustani Art music with etymology and cultural connotations. Two of his books, Stage Music of Maharashtra and Maharashtra: Art music shed light on the musical theatre and art music in Maharashtra, giving a wider perspective about region based cultural musicology. In Some Hindustani Musicians: They lit the way! (Promilla Publishers, New Delhi, 2011), Dr Ranade's observations and interpretations about various maestros in Hindustani Music give us an analytical perspective along with the aesthetic experience of the musician's music. He contributed a lot in developing the "Aesthetics of Indian Music" through his book Sangeetache Saundarya Shastra (संगीताचे सौंदर्यशास्त्र). He also introduced the aesthetics of Western music to Indian readers through his book, Stravinsky che Sangeetik Saundarya Shastra. "The theory of six categories of music" is considered to be the most important and well accepted theory proposed by Ranade which structures Musical categories as 1.Primitive, 2.Folk, 3.Art, 4.Devotional, 5.Popular and 6.Confluence. He was pioneer in theorizing the unexplored areas such as Folk Music in India in his book Lok Sangeet Shastra (लोकसंगीत शास्त्र), Hindi Film Song: Music Beyond Boundaries and Popular music in the book Sangeet Sangati (संगीत संगती). He also contributed in Theatre theory with the book Music and Drama (Sri Ram Center for Art and Culture, New Delhi, 19910. His books Bhashan Rang (भाषणरंग) is used as a handbook of Voice culture for theatre. He had penned down his musicings on theatre in Bhashan Ani Natya Vishayak Vichar (भाषण व नाट्य विषयक विचार).

== Compositions ==
Ashok Da. Ranade composed many Bandishes, with pen-name "Rasik Rang", in many common and rare Ragas and Talas. He has also re-interpreted many traditional compositions with his unique aesthetic vision. He also composed more than 60 Marathi 'Baithakichi Lavani' compositions.

== Teaching ==
He contributed as an educationist in the field of music with giving basic insights for making courses & syllabuses at many Indian and foreign Universities. As a guru he trained many in Hindustani Art Music such as Milind Malshe, Kedar Bodas, Suresh Bapat, Kalyani Salunke, Shuchita Athalekar, Manjusha Patil, Vidya Dengle, Madhao Imartey, Sameer Dublay, Harsha Bhave, Chaitanya Kunte etc. Many renowned singers such as Shruti Sadolikar, Faiyaz, Rajashri Pathak, Ranjana Joglekar, Prachi Dublay, etc. also got guidance from him during the thematic concerts. Many theater personalities, such as Bhakti Barve, Ila Bhate, Sayaji Shinde, Veena Jamkar, etc. got his guidance for Voice Culture.

== Publications ==
=== Books authored ===
1. Nicobar Bete, National Book Trust, New Delhi, Translated into Marathi, 1968
2. Sangeetache Saundaryashastra, Mouj Prakashan Griha and Aesthetics Society, Bombay, 1971, (Marathi)
3. Lokasangeetashastra, Maharashtra Universities Book Production Board, Nagpur, 1975, (Marathi)
4. Stravinskyche Sangeetik Saundaryashastra, Board of Literature and Culture, Government of Maharashtra, 1975, (Marathi)
5. On Music and Musicians of Hindoostan, Promilla and Co. New Delhi, 1984, (English)
6. Stage Music of Maharashtra, Sangeet Natak Akademi, New Delhi, 1986, (English)
7. Maharashtra: Art Music, Maharashtra Information Center, New Delhi, 1989, (English)
8. Keywords and Concepts in Hindustani Art Music, Promilla and Co., New Delhi, 1990 (English)
9. Music and Drama, Sri Ram Center for Art and Culture, New Delhi, 1991, (English)
10. Indology and Ethnomusicology: Contours of Early Indo-British Relationship, Promilla and Co., New Delhi, 1992, (English)
11. Bhashanrang, Popular Prakashan, Bombay, 1995, (Marathi) (First reprint 2009)
12. Hindustani Music, (English) National Book Trust, New Delhi, 1997(First Reprint 2002, second 2005)
13. Essays in Indian Ethnomusicology, Munshiram Manoharlal, New Delhi, 1998
14. Reflections on Musicology and History – With reference to Hindustani Music, Indian Musicological Society, Mumbai-Baroda, 2001
15. Bhashan Va Natya Vishayak Vichar, Popular Prakashan, Mumbai, 2001
16. Hindi Film Song: Music Beyond Boundaries, Promilla Publishers, New Delhi, 2006
17. Kirananchi Savli (Marathi), (Collection of short essays on Marathi Bhavgeet in Anaghrat, Aurangabad, 2006)
18. Hindustani Music, (Marathi), National Book Trust, New Delhi, 2006
19. Music-Contexts: A Concise Dictionary of Hindustani Music, Promilla Publishers, New Delhi, 2006
20. Perspectives on Music: Ideas and Theories, Promilla and Co. Publishers, New Delhi and Chicago, 2008
21. Sangeetvichar, (Marathi)(Popular Prakashan, Mumbai, 2009
22. Mala Bhavlele Sangeetkar (Marathi), Rajhans Prakashan, Pune, 2010
23. Some Hindustani Musicians: They lit the way!, Promilla Publishers, New Delhi, 2011
24. Hindi Chitrapatgeet: Parampara ani Avishkar, (Marathi) Popular prakashan, Mumbai, 2010
25. Sangeet Sangati, (Marathi) Rajhans Prakashan, Pune, 2013
26. Pashchatya Sangeet Samjnya Kosh, (Marathi) Popular Prakashan, Mumbai, 2017

=== Edited ===
1. Sangeet Natak: Hindi Film Music: A Perspective, Sangeet Natak Akademi, New Delhi, 1991
2. Hasya Vinod Sukhatmika, (Anthology of Papers, co-edited with Prof. Vijaya Rajadhyaksha), Granthali, Bombay, 1992 (Marathi)
3. Kathashatabdi, (Anthology of Papers, co-edited with Prof. Vijaya Rajadhyaksha, Granthali, Bombay, 1993 (Marathi)

== Discography ==
1. Music from Gangubai Hangal: A Multi-media Album, Academy of Performing Arts, Hubli, 1988
2. Baithakichi Lavani, Oriental Cassettes, Bombay, 1991
3. Devagani, Kalanirnaya-Zapata Cassettes, Bombay, 1991
4. Geetibhan, Department of Music, University of Mumbai, 2007
5. Santanchi Vatchal, Shree Charitable trust, Mumbai, 2007
6. Sanchay: An Album of Compositions in Raga-s Yaman, Bihag and Bhairavi with explanations and text, Underscore Records, Mumbai, 2007
7. Kala Ganesh, Shree Charitable trust, Mumbai, 2008
8. Ram Gane, Shree Charitable trust, Mumbai, 2009

== Musical presentations composed ==
- Natyasangitachi Vatchal (1984)
- Manapamanatil Gani (1986)
- Sawan (1988)
- Baithakichi Lavani (1989)
- Devagani (1991)
- Sangeetrang (1992)
- Swarachakra (1993)
- Rangbasant (1993)
- Natyasangeetache Marathi Valan (1994)
- Radha (1995)
- Tribhang to Abhang (1995)
- Rachana te Bandish (1997)
- Gayakiche valan (2000)
- Sanchit (2004)
- Chandrabhairavi (2005)
- Geetibhan (2007)
- Santanchi Vatchal (2007)
- Kala Ganesh (2008)
- Ramgane (2009)

== Honours ==
- Selected to the Tagore Chair for Humanities, M. S. University of Baroda, 1994–95 (Lectures on: Music, Growth and Aging, Music and Myth)
- Music Forum Award for Music Research, Music Forum, Mumbai, 1998
- Government of Maharashtra Award for Kaladan, 2007
- Narhar Kurundkar Puraskar (Sameeksha) Government of Maharashtra Award for the Publication entitled Sangeetvichar, 2009,
- Sangeet Natak Akademi Award, New Delhi, 2010
