= Vikas Kashalkar =

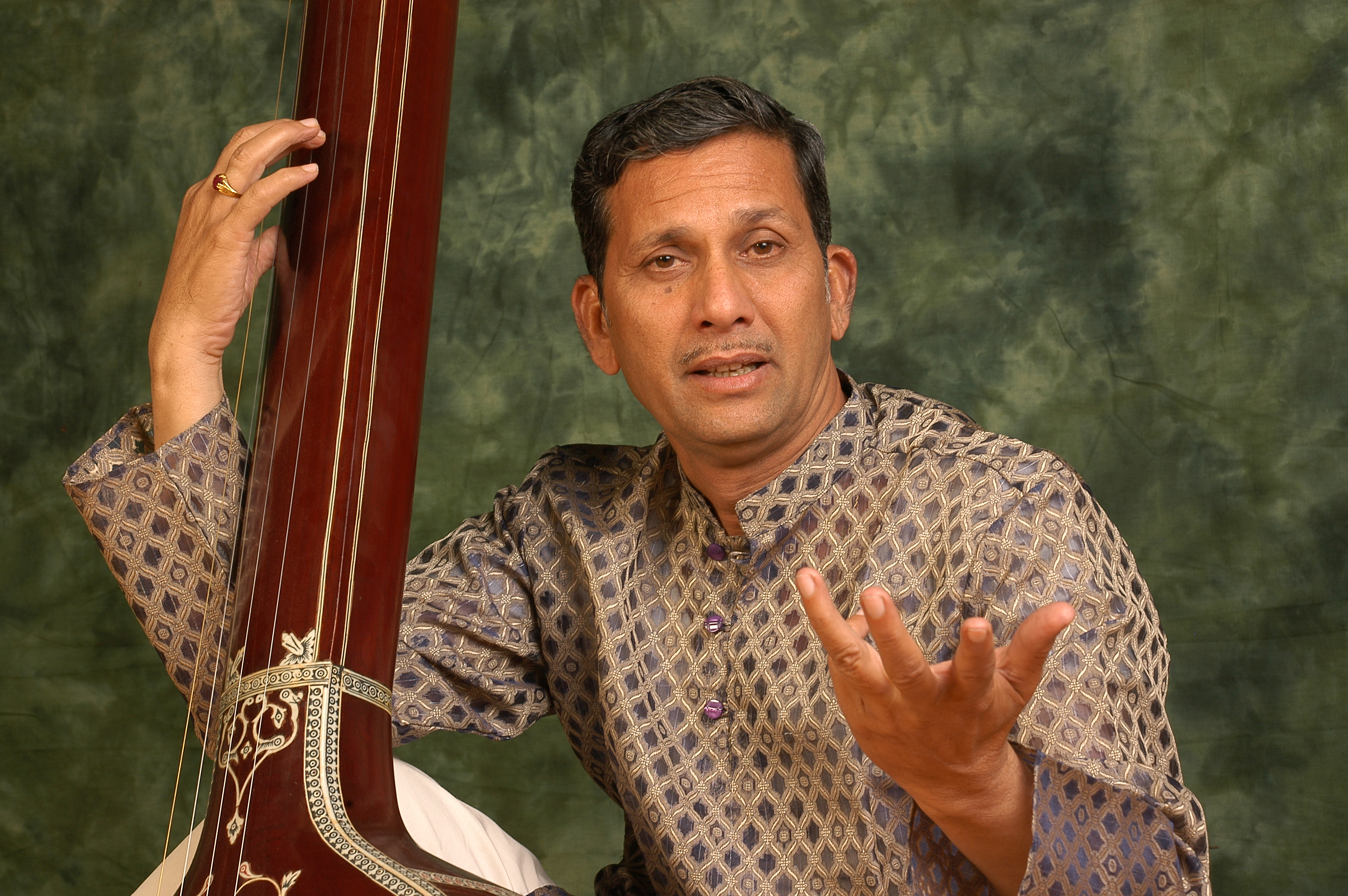

Background information
- Born: 16 July 1950 (age 75)
- Origin: Pune, Maharashtra, India
- Genres: Hindustani classical music, Gwalior Gharana
- Occupation: Classical Vocalist
- Years active: 1975–present
- Website: www.vikaskashalkar.com

Vikas Kashalkar (born 16 July 1950) is an Indian classical vocalist, with training in the Gwalior, Jaipur, and Agra gharanas.
