= Gururao Deshpande =

Indian singer (1889–1982)

Guru Rao Deshpande
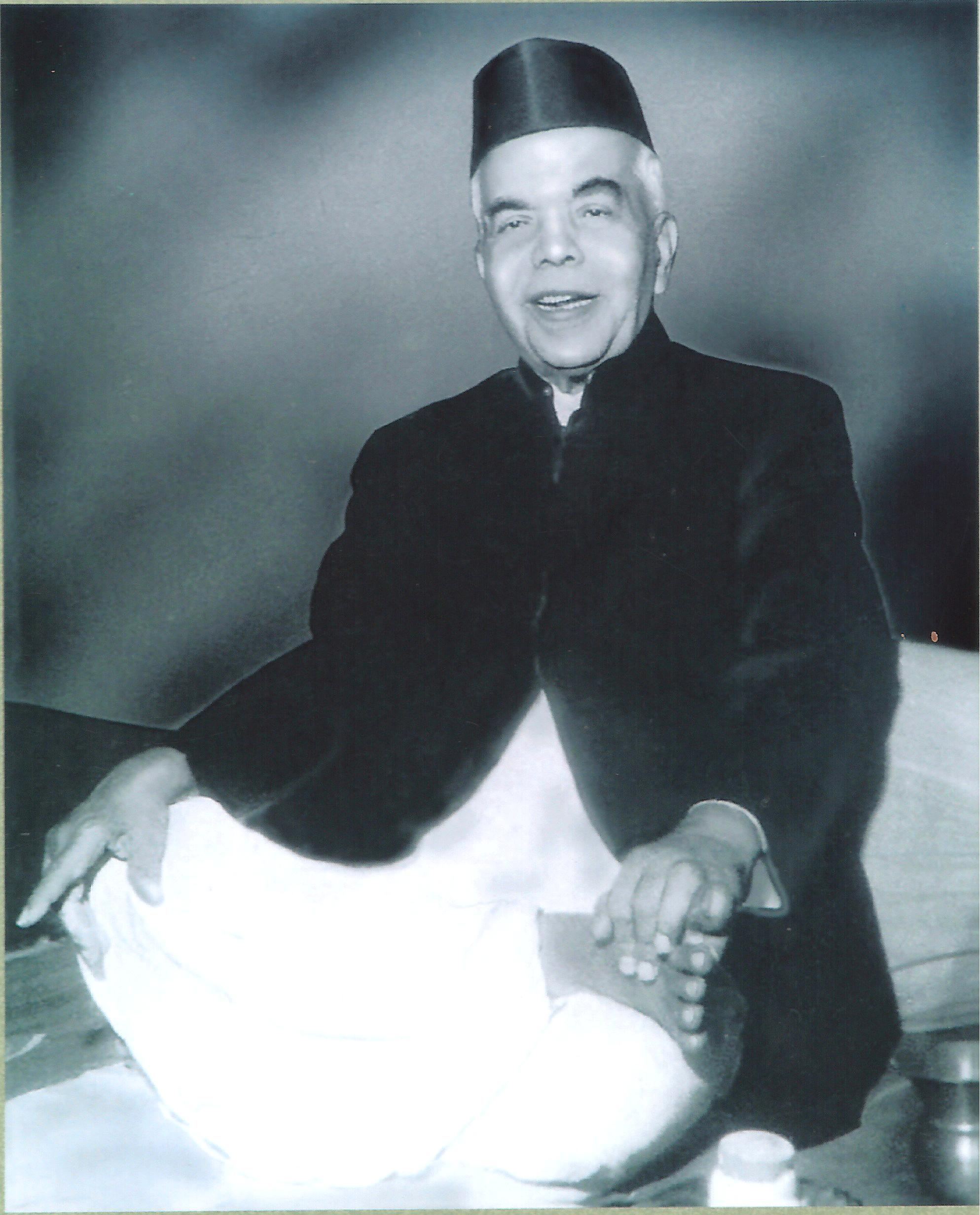

Background information
- Born: Gururao Deshpande; 1889
- Origin: Karnataka
- Died: 1982 (aged 92–93)
- Genres: Hindustani classical vocal, Thumri, Tappas, Bhajans, abhangs, Devaranama, Gamaka Vachana in Hindustani classical style.
- Occupation: singer
- Years active: 1899 to 1982
- Website: http://www.gururaodeshpandesangeetsabha.com

Guru Rao Deshpande (1889–1982) was a singer from Karnataka, India. His father, Narayanrao Deshpande, was a Carnatic musician who planned for his son to become a lawyer. However, the young Gururao had exhibited an intense attraction for Hindustani classical music. His parents had him tutored by vocalists Dattopant Joshi and T. K. Pitre when he was ten years old.

== Gururao and literature ==
He was versed both in Kannada and English and enjoyed reading both languages. He mastered Kumaravyasa Bharata and Lakshmish Bharata, the two great epics of Kannada literature. His innovation was to recite both these epics in Hindustani music Gamaka style, inspired by Bharat Bindurao.

He earned presenting the long discourses of Kumaravyasa and Lakshmisha Bharata. Throughout these Gamaka recitals across the State, Gururao was accompanied by Betageri Krishna Sharma, who provided the 'Vyakhyana' (interpretation in prose). The Gamaka conference at Hubli crowned Gururao with the title 'Gamaka Gauri Shankara'. Gnyanpeeth poet D. R. Bendre kept close association with Gururao via discussions of Kannada literature. Gururao was equally proficient in English. He passed Inter Arts (a great feat) and admired Wordsworth, Milton and Shakespeare. Gururao studied astrology and practiced it for leisure.

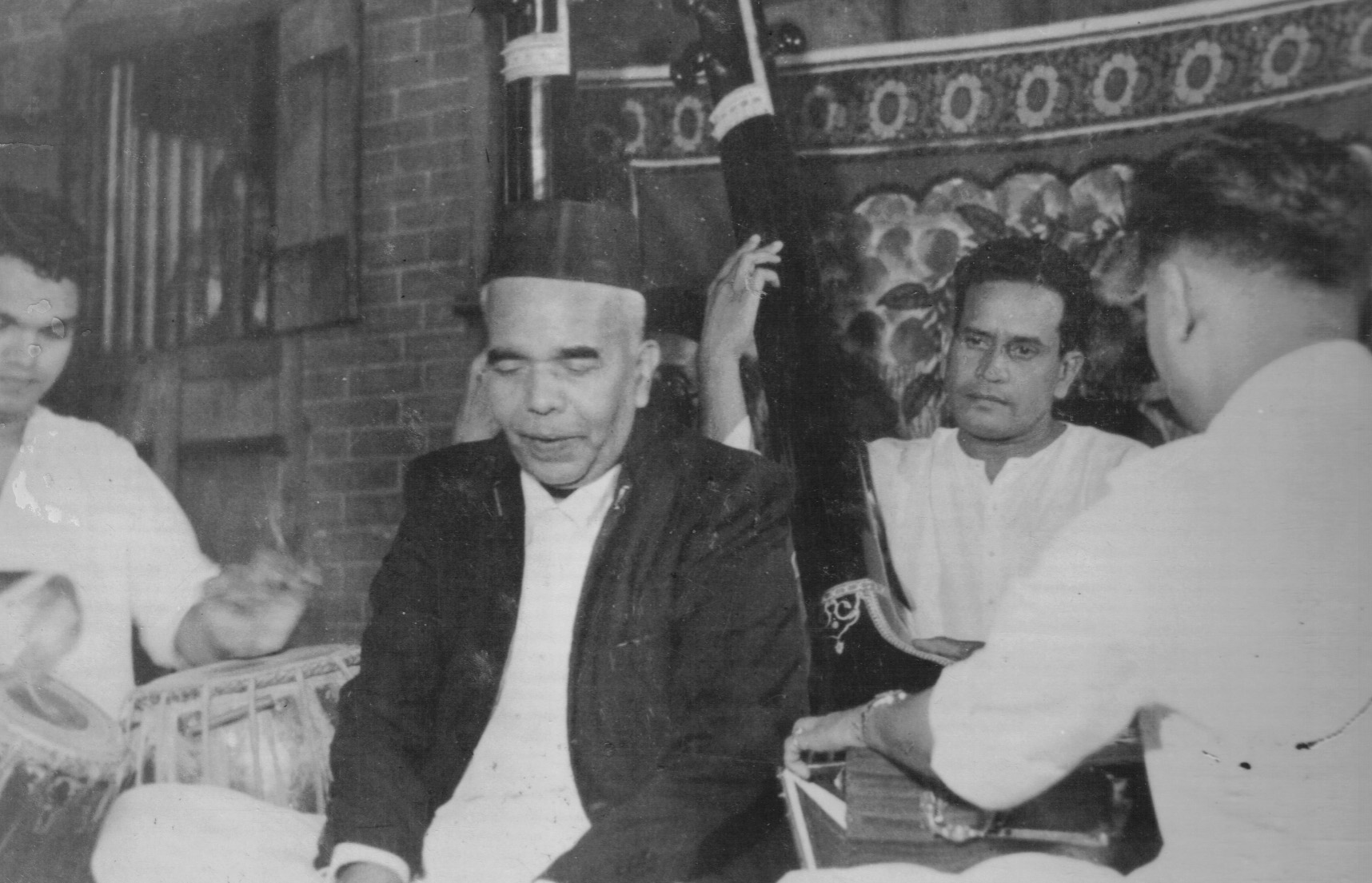
Gururao with Bhimsen Joshi

== Students ==
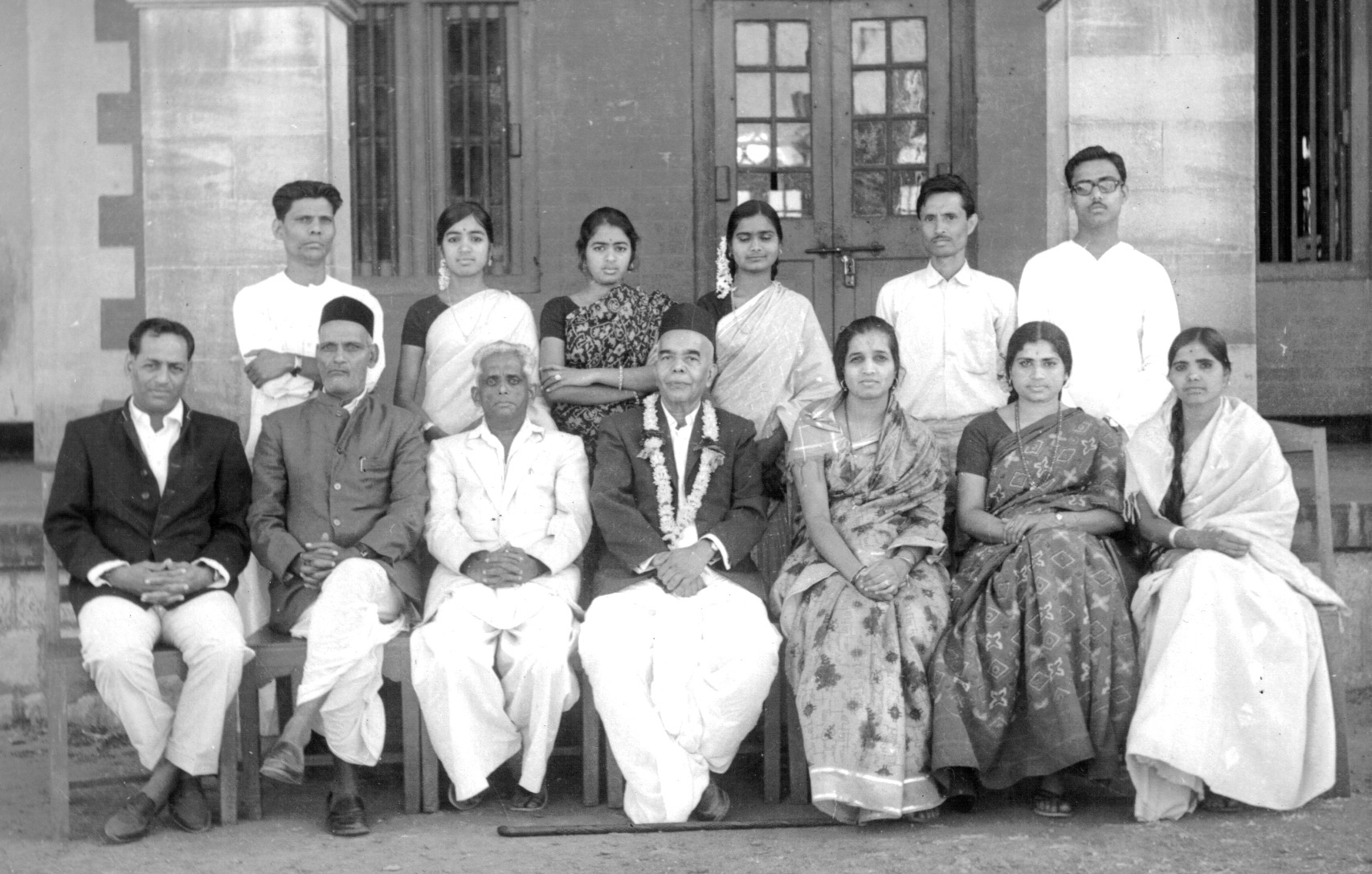
Gururao with his students

- Pandit Narayan Rao Majumdar
- Pandit Vinayak Malharrao Torvi
- Smt Lata Nadgir
- Sri B N Lonkhadi
- Smt Mala Dixit
- Smt Vijaya Lingsur
- Sri Dheerendra Havanur
- Smt Sunanda Kadapa
- Smt Ratnaprabha Joshi
- Sri Chidambar Torvi.
