= Balakrishnabuwa Ichalkaranjikar =

- Born: 1849; Ichalkaranji
- Origin: Maharashtra, India
- Died: 1926 (aged 77)
- Genres: Hindustani classical music
- Occupation: Classical Vocalist
- Years active: 1867–1920

Balakrishnabuwa Ichalkaranjikar (1849–1926) was an Indian vocalist of the Khyal genre of Hindustani classical music. He learned the Gwalior gharana (singing style) and brought it to Maharashtra.

== Life ==
Balakrishnabuwa Ichalkaranjikar was born in Maharashtra.

He travelled to Gwalior, then the centre of the Khayal genre of Indian classical music, and studied under Vasudeorao Joshi. He then returned to Maharashtra, and settled near Miraj because its climate suited him. Soon Miraj and the nearby area became a hub of Hindustani classical music, which it has remained since.

Buwa's chief disciples included Neelakanthbuwa Mirajkar, Vishnu Digambar Paluskar, the founder of Akhil Bharatiya Gandharva Mahavidyalaya Mandal, his son Annabuwa (who predeceased him), Anant Manohar Joshi (Antu-buwa), Mirashi buwa and Vamanbuwa Chafekar.
