= Vishnu Digambar Paluskar =

Indian vocalist (1872–1931)

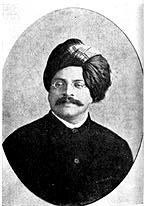
- Born: 18 August 1872; Kurundwad, Bombay Presidency, British India
- Died: 21 August 1931 (aged 59)
- Occupation: Hindustani classical singer
- Children: D. V. Paluskar

Pandit Vishnu Digambar Paluskar (18 August 1872 – 21 August 1931) was a Hindustani musician. He sang the original version of the bhajan Raghupati Raghava Raja Ram, and founded the Gandharva Mahavidyalaya on 5 May 1901. He is also credited with arranging India's national song, Vande Mātaram, as it is heard today. His original surname was Gadgil, but as they hailed from the village Palus (near Sangli), they came to be known as the "Paluskar" family.

== Early life and background ==
Vishnu Digambar Paluskar was born in a Chitpavan Brahmin Marathi family of Kurundwad, a small town falling under the Deccan division of Bombay Presidency during British rule, presently in Maharashtra. His father, Digambar Gopal Paluskar, was a singer of Kirtan.

He went to a local school in Kurundwad for primary education. But tragedy struck Paluskar at an early age. During a Hindu festival called Datta Jayanti, a fire-cracker burst near his face, damaging both his eyes. Being a small town, there was no immediate treatment available and Paluskar lost his eyesight. Nevertheless, he regained it some years later.

Recognising the talent in the boy, the king of Miraj put him under the guidance of Balakrishnabuwa Ichalkaranjikar, a learned musician. Paluskar trained under him for 12 years until 1896, when the relations between the teacher and Paluskar became strained.

== Musical journey ==
After that Paluskar began touring the country and studied the musical traditions in each part of Northern India. He went from place to place and visited many royal families in cities like Baroda and Gwalior, well known for their patronage of musicians. He broke a long-standing tradition of Indian music by giving a public concert in Saurashtra and charging a nominal fee. Till then, concerts were given only in palaces or temples. He studied Brijbhasha, a dialect of Hindi, spoken at Mathura. He later met Pandit Chandan Chaube from whom he learnt Dhrupad. In 1901, he reached Lahore, where he decided to establish a music school.

=== Gandharva Mahavidyalaya ===
On 5 May 1901, Pandit Vishnu Digambar Paluskar founded the Gandharva Mahavidyalaya, a school to impart formal training in Indian classical music with some historical Indian Music. This was a school open to all and one of the first in India to run on public support and donations, rather than royal patronage. It was a challenge to the traditional method where students lived under the same roof with their teachers. Many students from the School's early batches became respected musicians and teachers in North India. This brought respect to musicians, who were treated with disdain earlier.

In September 1908, Paluskar went to Bombay (now Mumbai) to establish another branch of the school. As the work-load increased, he shifted the school from Lahore to Bombay. To accommodate all the students, he took loans, built a new building for the school and hostel as well. To settle debts, he gave several public concerts. But while on a concert tour in 1924, Paluskar's creditors attacked his properties and auctioned the school.

== Death and legacy ==
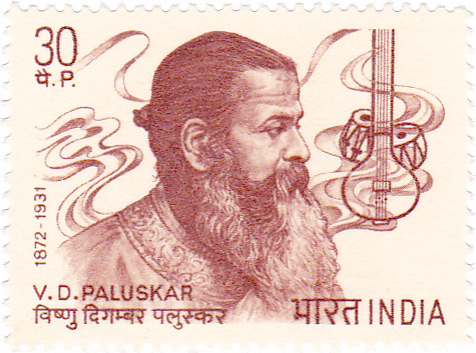
Paluskar on a 1973 stamp of India

Paluskar died on 21 August 1931, three days after his 59th birthday. Today, Paluskar is seen as the musician who brought respect to the profession of classical musicians and took Hindustani classical music out from the traditional Gharana system to the masses. He wrote a book on music called Sangeet Bal Prakash in three volumes, and 18 volumes on ragas as well. His disciples Vinayakrao Patwardhan, Omkarnath Thakur, Narayanrao Vyas, and B. R. Deodhar became renowned classical singers and teachers. His son Dattatreya Vishnu Paluskar was also trained in classical music.

On 21 July 1973, the Post and Telegraph Department, Government of India paid homage to Paluskar by releasing a commemorative stamp. In its 2000 millennial issue, India Today magazine included Paluskar in its list of "100 people who shaped India".

== See also ==
- Vishnu Narayan Bhatkhande
