= Yashwant Kerkar =

Indian musician (1914–1989)

- Born: Yashwant Kerkar; 21 February 1914; Bag-Keri, Portuguese Goa
- Died: 18 December 1989 (aged 75)
- Genres: Hindustani classical music
- Occupations: Tabla player, music educator
- Instrument: Tabla

Yashwant Kerkar (21 February 1914 – 18 December 1989) was a prominent Goan tabla player and educator. Over a career spanning several decades, he accompanied many of the most celebrated vocalists of Hindustani classical music and trained hundreds of students in the art of tabla.

== Early life and inspiration ==
Yashwant Kerkar was born on 21 February 1914 in Bag-Keri, Goa. His father was a tabla player, which provided him with early exposure to the instrument. His passion for music was ignited by watching Sangeet Natak (musical theater) rehearsals in the village of Pira. A formative incident occurred when a young Kerkar, noticing the absence of the regular artist during a rehearsal at Bhaskar Shet Kansar's house, began playing the tabla himself. When the organizers arrived and reprimanded him for his boldness, the experience motivated him to become a master of the instrument. He initially gained experience providing accompaniment during weekly Monday performances at the Mangeshi Temple.

== Musical training ==
Kerkar's formal education in tabla began under Gopinath Mangeshkar in Goa. His talent was recognized by Deenanath Mangeshkar, who recruited him into the Balwant Sangeet Natak Company in 1933. While traveling with the company, he continued his studies under Valle-mama.

- He underwent rigorous training under several legendary masters of different gharanas (schools of music):
- He studied the Delhi baaj (style) for twelve years after a formal ganda-bandhan ceremony with Gamme Khan.
- He received training in the Ajrada style from Khan Habibuddin.
- He learned the intricacies of layakari (rhythmic interplay) from Khaprumam Parvatkar.
- He studied various facets of tabla playing under Pandit Kagurao Mangeshkar, Pandit Subray Ankolkar, Ahmed Jan "Thirakwa" Khan, Ustad Amir Hussain Khan, and Ustad Shamsuddin Khan.
- For light classical forms like Thumri, Ghazal, and Qawwali, he was tutored by Ghamman Khan.
- To master accompaniment for Kathak dance, he sought instruction from Lachhu Maharaj.

== Career ==
Kerkar was a highly sought-after accompanist who performed alongside the leading Indian classical vocalists of his time, including Abdul Karim Khan, Kesarbai Kerkar, Gangubai Hangal, Mogubai Kurdikar, Kishori Amonkar, Sawai Gandharva, and Jagannathbuwa Purohit, among others.

Professionally, he served as a staff artist at the Mumbai station of All India Radio. In his later years, he dedicated himself to teaching, serving as a tabla instructor at the Kala Academy's Music College in Goa for two years. He is credited with training approximately 300 students, including noted Goan tabla players Prabhakar Chari and Tulsidas Navelkar.

== Death ==
Kerkar died on 18 December 1989.
