= Jaipur-Atrauli gharana =

Hindustani music apprenticeship group

The Jaipur-Atrauli Gharana (also known as Jaipur Gharana, Atrauli-Jaipur Gharana, and Alladiyakhani Gayaki) is a Hindustani music apprenticeship fraternity (gharana), founded by Alladiya Khan in the late-19th century. Evolved from the dhrupad tradition of the Atrauli and Dagarbani lineages, but known for khayal, this gharana is known for producing acclaimed musicians like Kishori Amonkar, Kesarbai Kerkar, Laxmibai Jadhav, Mogubai Kurdikar, Mallikarjun Mansur, Shruti Sadolikar, Dhondutai Kulkarni, and Ashwini Bhide-Deshpande. Consequently, this gharana developed a reputation for its distinctive vocal aesthetics, raga repertoire, and technical aptitude.

== History ==
The Jaipur-Atrauli gharana emerged from Alladiya Khan's family which originated from Atrauli (near Aligarh) and migrated to Jaipur. This gharana mainly evolved from Dagar-bani of Dhrupad, however it also absorbed finer essence of Gauhar-bani and Khandar-bani.

The style which is today called Jaipur-Atrauli gharana was supposedly designed by Alladiya Khan when he was around the age of 40. His patron at the court of Ambetha had required him to sing continuously for several days, which permanently damaged his voice. In response, he conceptualized a new approach to khyal which he believed would be compelling to audiences even without the natural sweetness of vocal tone that he had lost.

=== Etymology ===
A subgroup of the broader Atrauli gharana, the Jaipur-Atrauli gharana includes "Jaipur" to account for the geographical history of Alladiya Khan's family.

Scholars say the hyphenated moniker of this gharana recognizes that Jaipur-Atrauli gharana musicians originally came from Atrauli Village in Aligarh district and migrated to the court of the Maharaja of Jaipur, their principal patron. Others say they came to the Jaipur Maharaja's court and then dispersed to various other courts in the area, like Jodhpur, Uniyara, Bundi, Atrauli.

=== Roots in Haveli Sangeet ===
Many of the ragas and compositions sung in the Jaipur gharana come from the tradition of Haveli Sangeet and dhrupad, such as:

- "Deva Deva Satsang" in Savani Kalyan
- "Ey Pyari Pag Hole" in Bihagada
- "Mero Piya Rasiya" in Nayaki Kanada
- "Anahat Aadi Naad" in Savani Nat
- "Devta Aadi Sab" in Kukubh Bilawal
- "Devi Durge" in Sukhiya Bilawal
- "Ye Ho Neend Na Ayaee" in Bihari
- "Papiha Na Bole" in Jayat Kalyan
- "Jabase Piyu Sapaneme" Jaitashree
- "Preetam Sainya" Lalita Gauri
- "Ree Tum Samajh" Rayasa Kanada.

== Aesthetics ==
This gharana features complex layakari and a repertoire of compound and mixed ragas. Unlike the linear note progression of other schools, Jaipur gayaki uses oblique phrasing and spiraling gamak taans. Key characteristics include meend in aalap, rhythmic precision involving fractional beats, and a graceful arrival at the Sam.

== Repertoire ==
=== Specialty Ragas ===
The Jaipur-Atrauli tradition is known for signature and speciality ragas that have been created or revived by Alladiya Khan. These include:

- Raga Sampurna Malkauns
- Raga Basanti Kedar, a jod raga of Basant and Kedar.
- Raga Basant Bahar, a jod raga of Basant and Bahar.
- Raga Bihagda
- Raga Khat
- Raga Gandhari
- Raga Nat Kamod, a jod raga of Shuddha Nat and Kamod.
- Raga Jait Kalyan, a jod raga of Jait and Kalyan.
- Raga Kafi Kanada, a jod raga of Kafi and Kanada (either Darbari Kanada, Bageshri Kanada, or Nayaki Kanada).
- Raga Raisa Kanada, a jod raga of Shahana Kanada and Nayaki Kanada.
- Raga Basanti Kanada, a jod raga of Basant and Kanada.
- Raga Savani Nat, a jod raga of Savani and Shuddha Nat.
- Raga Savani Kalyan, a jod raga of Savani and Yaman.
- Raga Bhoop Nat, a jod raga of Bhoopali and Shuddha Nat.
- Raga Bihari
- Raga Pat Bihag, a jod raga of Patdeep and Bihag.
- Raga Daguri
- Raga Godhani

This tradition is known for their repertoire and presentation of jod ragas (mixed or hybrid ragas). Alladiya Khan introduced many lesser-known or obscure ragas in his repertoire.

=== Legacy ===
Jaipur-Atrauli musicians and their styles have greatly influenced music on the Indian subcontinent. From ghazals of Mehdi Hassan to the Marathi natyageets of Bal Gandharva, the Jaipur-Atrauli style has enjoyed broad popular appeal. Within Hindustani Classical music, many popular musicians outside of this tradition have adopted some of its aesthetics and techniques, most notably Bhimsen Joshi. Given the popularity of Kishori Amonkar, this tradition features many women singers. Uniquely this gharana has over four generations of leading female vocalists.

== Family Ancestry ==
The following visualization is based on several historical accounts.

Dagarbani; Parampara
Nath; Vishwambhar
Haridas; Dagar	Nayak; Gopal
Miyan; Tansen
Atrauli; Gharana; Parampara	Gauharbani; Parampara	Nauharbani; Parampara
Miyan Bade Karim; Baksh Khan
Miyan Mantol; Khan	Miyan Bhopat; Khan
Miyan Zahoor; Khan	Miyan Gulab; Khan
Sikandrabad; Gharana	Miyan Hande Imam; Baksh Khan	Miyan Hussain; Khan
Ramzan Khan "Rangile"	Qadar; Khan
Rangile; Gharana	Miyan Chhajjoo; Khan	Miyan Dilawar "Dallooo" Khan
Jahangir; Khan	Khwaja Ahmed; Khan	Chiman; Khan	Ahmed; Khan	Zahoor Baksh; Khan "Ramdas"
Khairat Ali; Khan	Amrunnissa; Begum
Mohammed; Khan	Ghulam Ahmed "Alladiya" Khan	Haider; Khan
Agra; Gharana	Jaipur-Atrauli; Gharana	Khurja; Gharana

== Pedagogical Genealogy ==
=== Initial Generations ===
The following tree includes the immediate disciples of Alladiya Khan according to Govindrao Tembe and Mallikarjun Mansur.

Jaipur- Atrauli; Guru; Parampara
Mohammed; Khan	Ghulam; Ahmed "Alladiya" Khan
Ahmed; Khan	Haider; Khan	Bhaskarbuwa; Bakhale
Tanibai; Ghorpade "Ghorpadebai"	Govindrao; Tembe	Govindbuwa; Shaligram	Wamanrao; Sadolikar	Tribhuvandas; Jariwala	Shankarrao; Sarnaik
Qamaruddin "Natthan"; Khan
Nasiruddin "Badeji" Khan	Badruddin "Manji" Khan	Shamsuddin "Bhurji" Khan	Madhukar "Nana"; Sadolikar
Mohanrao; Palekar	Gulubhai; Jasdanwalla	Abdul; Majid; Khan (sarangiya)	"Surashree"; Kesarbai; Kerkar
Leelabai; Shirgaonkar	"Gaan Tapaswini"; Mogubai; Kurdikar	Laxmibai; Jadhav
Sushila Rani; Patel	Mallikarjun; Mansur	"Baba"; Azizuddin; Khansaheb	Nivruttibuwa; Sarnaik

=== Recent Generations ===
The following includes recent branches of the Jaipur-Atrauli gharana according to various sources.

Jaipur- Atrauli; Guru; Parampara
Mohammed; Khan	Ghulam; Ahmed "Alladiya" Khan
Ahmed; Khan	Haider; Khan	Bhaskarbuwa; Bakhale
Tanibai; Ghorpade "Ghorpadebai"	Govindbuwa; Shaligram	Govindrao; Tembe	Wamanrao; Sadolikar	Azizuddin; Baba; Khansaheb	Tribhuvandas; Jariwala	Shankarrao; Sarnaik
Qamaruddin "Natthan"; Khan
Badruddin "Manji" Khan	Nasiruddin "Badeji" Khan	Shamsuddin "Bhurji" Khan	Madhukarrao; Sadolikar
Mohanrao; Palekar	Gulubhai; Jasdanwalla	Abdul; Majid; Khan (sarangiya)	Kesarbai; Kerkar
Leelabai; Shirgaonkar	Mogubai; Kurdikar	Laxmibai; Jadhav
Sushila Rani; Patel	Mallikarjun; Mansur	Nivruttibuwa; Sarnaik
Vidya; Pisal "Azambai"	Madhusudan; Kanetkar	Gajananrao; Joshi	C. Balaji
Babanrao; Haldankar	Vamanrao; Deshpande
Kamal; Pathare	G. T. Tilak "Tilak Master"
Krishnarao; Chonkar	Anandrao; Limayebuwa	Padmavati; Gokhale; Shaligram	Appsaheb; Deshpande	Menakabai; Shirodkar	"Baba"; Azizuddin; Khan
Manohar; Potdar	Suresh; Haldankar	Ratnakar; Pai	Jitendra; Abhisheki	Agra; Gharana	Baburao; Joshi	Dhondutai; Kulkarni	Dinkar; Panshikar	Prasad; Savkar	Vijaya; Jadhav- Gatlewar
Sayeed & Rasheed "Khan Bandhu"	Shripad; Bhirdikar
Bhalchandra; Patekar	Atrauli; Gharana	Kishori; Amonkar	Suhasini; Mulgaonkar	Kamal; Tambe	Kausalya; Manjeshwar	Bharti; Vaishampayan	Sukhada; Kane	Shobha; Gurtu	Madhusudan; Apte	Ladkujan; Nandanikar	Jayashree; Patanekar
Sardarbai; Kardgekar	Rajshekhar; Mansur	Panchakshariswami; Mattigati	Aundh; Gharana
Arun; Kulkarni
Bhalchandra; Tilak	Milind; Malshe	Manik; Bhide	Arun; Dravid	Padma; Talwalkar	Kumudini; Katdare	Siddharaj; Jambaldini	Mrityunjaya; Agadi	Sulabha; Mohile	Jyotsna; Mohile
Vijaya; Joglekar	Sudha Bakhre- Athalye	M. G. Patwardhan	Ulhas; Kashalkar	Shruti; Sadolikar- Katkar
Sudhakar; Digrajkar	Neelakshi; Juvekar	Prasad; Gulvani
Ashwini; Bhide- Deshpande	Devaki; Pandit	Arati; Ankalikar- Tikekar	Raghunandan; Panshikar	Bharati; Vaishampayan	Vishwas; Shirgaonkar	Nagarajarao; Havaldar	Geeta; Javadekar	Alka; Deo- Marulkar	Manjiri; Karve; Alegaonkar
Priyadarshini; Kulkarni
Shalmalee; Joshi	Meena; Joshi	Meera; Panshikar	Nandini; Bedekar	Yashaswi; Sirpotdar	Pratima; Tilak	Namita; Devidayal	Smita; Bhagwat	Umesh; Munavalli	Ninad; Deo	Manjiri; Asnare- Kelkar	Bharati; Vaishampayan	Lata; Godse	Vandana; Bhagwat
Milind; Raikar	Gauri; Pathare	Sanjay; Dixit	Omkarnath; Havaldar	Vasanti; Tembe	Madhuvanti; Deo	Varsha; Joshi- Sohoni
Revati; Kamat	Saniya; Patankar	Tejashree; Amonkar	Aditya; Khandwe	Rutuja; Lad	Deepika; Bhide- Bhagwat	Bhupal; Panshikar

==== Kolhapur Branch ====
This family tree includes the heirs of Alladiya Khan's disciples from his time in Kolhapur.

==== Bhurji Khan Branch ====
This family tree includes the heirs of Alladiya Khan's disciples from his son and student, Bhurji Khan.

==== Mogubai Kurdikar Branch ====
This family tree includes the heirs of Alladiya Khan's disciples from his student, Mogubai Kurdikar.

==== Bombay Branch ====
This family tree includes the heirs of Alladiya Khan's disciples from his time in Bombay.

== Exponents ==
=== 19th Century ===
- Chhaju Khan (c. 1780s – 1860s), disciple of father Qadar Khan.
- Dalloo Khan (c. 1780s – 1860s), disciple of father Qadar Khan.
- Jehangir Khan (c. 1810s – 1880s), disciple of father Chhaju Khan. Uncle and guru of Alladiya Khan and Haider Ali Khan.
- Chiman Khan (c. 1810s – 1880s), disciple of father Chhaju Khan. Uncle and guru of Alladiya Khan and Haider Ali Khan..
- Khwaja Ahmed Khan (c. 1810s – 1860s), disciple of father Chhaju Khan. Father and guru of Alladiya Khan and Haider Ali Khan..
- Alladiya Khan (1855 – 1946), Gharana founder; learned from uncle Jehangir Khan.
- Haider Ali Khan, learned from uncle Jehangir Khan and the older brother of Alladiya Khan.
- Ahmad Khan (c. 1820s – 1880s), disciple of father Dalloo Khan.
- Khairat Ali Khan (c. 1860s – 1930s), disciple of father Dalloo Khan. Father and guru of Azmat Hussain Khan.
- Bhaskarbuwa Bakhale (1869 – 1922), learned from Alladiya Khan. Also learned from Natthan Khan of Agra, Faiz Mohammed Khan of Gwalior, and Bande Ali Khan.

=== 20th Century ===
- Manji Khan (1888 – 1937), second son of Alladiya Khan. Learned from Alladiya Khan.
- Bhurji Khan (1890 – 1956), third son of Alladiya Khan. Learned from Alladiya Khan.
- Gulubhai Jasdanwalla, learned from Alladiya Khan.
- Kesarbai Kerkar (1892 – 1977), learned from Alladiya Khan.
- Krishnarao Phulambrikar (1898 – 1974), learned from Bhaskarbuwa Bakhale.
- Laxmibai Jadhav (1901 – 1979), learned from Haider Khan.
- Mogubai Kurdikar (1904 – 2001), learned from Alladiya Khan and Haider Khan.
- Wamanrao Sadolikar (1907 – 1986), learned from Bhurji Khan and attended many of Alladiya Khan's lessons to his disciples.
- Vamanrao Deshpande (1907 – 1990), learned from Natthan Khan and Mogubai Kurdikar.
- Gulubhai Jasdanwalla (c. 1900s - 1980s), learned from Alladiya Khan.
- Mallikarjun Mansur (1910 – 1992), learned from Manji Khan, Bhurji Khan, and later from Azizuddin Khan.
- Gajananrao Joshi (1911 – 1987), learned from Bhurji Khan.
- Nivruttibuwa Sarnaik (1912 – 1994), learned from Alladiya Khan.
- Madhusudan Kanetkar (1916 – 2007), learned from Bhurji Khan.
- Kausalya Manjeshwar (1922 – 2007), learned from Mogubai Kurdikar and Ganjananbuwa Joshi.
- "Baba" Azizzudin Khan (1921 – 2011), son and disciple of Bhurji Khan and also learned from grandfather Alladiya Khan.
- Ram Marathe (1924 – 1989), learned from Krishnarao Phulambrikar, Wamanrao Sadolikar, and Mogubai Kurdikar,
- Panchakshari Swami Mattigatti (1927 – 2013), learned from Mallikarjun Mansur.
- Babanrao Haldankar (1927 – 2016), learned from Mogubai Kurdikar. Also learned from Khadim Hussain Khan.
- Dhondutai Kulkarni (1927 – 2014), learned from Natthan Khan, Manji Khan, Bhurji Khan, Laxmibai Jadhav, Azizuddin Khan, and Kesarbai Kerkar.
- Ratnakar Pai (1928 – 2009), learned from Gulubhai Jasdanwalla and Mohanrao Palekar.
- Jitendra Abhisheki (1929 – 1998), learned from Azmat Hussain Khan, Gulubhai Jasdanwalla, and Ratnakar Pai.
- Kishori Amonkar (1931 – 2017), daughter and disciple of Mogubai Kurdikar. Also learned from Mohanrao Palekar, Anwar Hussein Khan of Agra Gharana, and Anjanibai Malpekar of Bhendi-Bazar Gharana.
- Manik Bhide (1935 – 2023), learned from Madhukar Sadolikar, Mogubai Kurdikar, and Kishori Amonkar.
- Dinkar Panshikar (1936 - 2020), learned from Nivruttibua Sarnaik.
- Madhukar Joshi (b. 1938), learned from father Gajananrao Joshi.
- Rajshekhar Mansur (1942 – 2022), learned from father Mallikarjun Mansur.
- Arun Kashalkar (b. 1943), learned from Gajananrao Joshi.
- Arun Dravid (b. 1943), learned from Abdul Majid Khan, Mogubai Kurdikar, and Kishori Amonkar.
- Kumundini Katdare (b. 1945), learned from Kamal Tambe and Madhusudan Kanetkar.
- Padma Talwalkar (b. 1948), learned from Mogubai Kurdikar and Gajananrao Joshi.
- Vikas Kashalkar (b. 1950), learned from
- Shruti Sadolikar (b. 1951), learned from father Wamanrao Sadolikar, Azizuddin Khan, and later Gulubhai Jasdanwalla.
- Alka Deo Marulkar (b. 1951), learned from Rajubhau Deo and Madhusudan Kanetkar.
- Milind Malshe (b. 1952), learned from Ratnakar Pai and Ashok Ranade.
- Bharati Vaishampayan (1954 – 2020), learned from Nivruttibuwa Sarnaik.
- Ulhas Kashalkar (b. 1955), learned from Gajananrao Joshi and Ram Marathe.
- Vijaya Jadhav Gatlewar (b. 1955), learned from Nivruttibuwa Sarnaik.
- Shubhada Paradkar (b. 1957), learned from Gajananrao Joshi and Babanrao Haldankar.
- Ashwini Bhide Deshpande (b. 1960), learned from mother Manik Bhide and later from Ratnakar Pai.
- Arati Ankalikar Tikekar (b. 1963), learned from Kishori Amonkar. Also learned from Vasantrao Kulkarni, Dinkar Kaikini, and Ulhas Kashalkar.
- Raghunandan Panshikar (b. 1963) learned from Kishori Amonkar and Mogubai Kurdikar.
- Devaki Pandit (b. 1965) learned from Kishori Amonkar, Jitendra Abhisheki, Babanrao Haldankar, and Arun Dravid.
- Mrityunjaya Agadi (b. 1965) learned from Panchakshari Swami Mattigati, Azizuddin Khan, and Rajshekhar Mansur.
- Sanjay Dixit (b. 1964), learned from Madhusudan Kanetkar, Bhaskarbuwa Shaligram, and Dhondutai Kulkarni.
- Nandini Bedekar (b. 1966), learned from Kishori Amonkar and was guided by Mogubai Kurdikar.
- Pratima Tilak (b. 1968), learned from Kausalya Manjeshwar and Kamal Tambe.
- Manjiri Asnare-Kelkar (b. 1971), learned from Madhusudan Kanetkar.
- Gauri Pathare (b. 1972), learned from Padma Talwalkar and Arun Dravid.

=== 21st Century ===
- Yashaswi Sirpotdar (b. 1980), learned from Padma Talwalkar.
- Mithun Chakravarthy (b. 1981), learned from Rajshekhar Mansur.
- Aditya Khandwe (b. 1983), learned from Ratnakar Pai and Dhondutai Kulkarni.
- Tejashree Amonkar (b. 1985), learned from her grandmother, Padmvibhushan Gayan-Saraswati Kishori Amonkar, and guided by great-grandmother, Gan-Tapaswini Mogubai Kurdikar.
- Rutuja Lad (b. 1992), learned from Dhondutai Kulkarni and Ashwini Bhide-Deshpande.
- Deepika Bhide-Bhagwat (b. 1992), learned from Dhondutai Kulkarni, Shubhada Paradkar, and Madhukar Joshi. Also learned from Vinayakbuwa Kale, Shruti Gokhale, and Shubha Joshi.
- Aarya Ambekar (b. 1994), learned from Shruti Ambekar and Devaki Pandit.

== Bibliography ==
- Gaanyogini Dhondutai Kulkarni (2014). Sur Sangat. Rajhans Prakashan. ISBN 978-81-7434-694-0.
- Babanrao Haldankar (2001). Aesthetics of Agra and Jaipur Traditions. Popular Prakashan. ISBN 978-81-7154-685-5.
