= Ila Paliwal =

- Born: Agra, India
- Genre: World music
- Instrument: Vocals
- Label: Padmasheel Productions
- Website: http://www.ilapaliwal.com/

Ila Paliwal is a classically trained Indian vocalist, songwriter and producer based in New York City.

== Early life ==
Paliwal was born in Agra India as one of two children. She was born in a literary family where music, art and literature were deeply ingrained.

Paliwal's father, Late Dr. Padma Singh Sharma Kamlesh was a nationally renowned poet and Hindi and Gujrati scholar, and her mother, Dr. Sushila Sharma Kamlesh, is an English and Sanskrit scholar.

At age 12, Paliwal started her vocal training with Pandit Sitaram Vyavhare of the Gwalior Gharana. Paliwal learned from many noted artists of Jaipur Gharana such as Padma Talwalkar, Aarti Anklikar and Pandit Raghunandan Panshikar.

Paliwal received her Bachelor of Arts in English, Economics, Music and Fine Arts from Dayalbagh Educational Institute, Agra and was awarded Director's highest medal. She also earned a Master of Arts in Fine Arts from Agra University, and her MA (Sangeet Praveen) with distinction in Hindustani classical vocal music from Prayag Sangeet Samiti, Allahabad, and a Bachelor of Arts in Mandarin (Chinese) from The Beijing Language and Culture University, Beijing, China. She worked as Cross Cultural Consultant in Beijing China.

== Career ==
Paliwal has performed at Carnegie Hall in New York, Kennedy Center in Washington DC, Trade Centre 2 in Dubai, Nokia Center in Los Angelea, National Centre for the Performing Arts (India) Mumbai, International Women's conference in Beijing China to name a few.

Paliwal released her album Navaratna in 2015 at Carnegie Hall to a sold-out audience. In 2015 she also released a video Holi celebrating the Indian ancient phrase "Vasudev Kutumbakam". In 2016 music Producer Quincy Jones, included her "Holi" song in his list of best 15 songs from around the world for a premier World Music Magazine SONGLINE. 'Holi' was honoured with the 2018 RoundGlass Award in the Best World Music category. Her album NAVARATNA was picked up by Lufthansa Airline and has become part of its inflight entertainment.

On September 27, 2020, Ila collaborated with Grammy Award-winning artists Ricky Kei Soweto Gospel Choir and Wouter Kellerman to premier ILA—The Earth Symphony: The Virtual Concert, to pay tribute to planet Earth.

Paliwal is a member of the Board of Directors of Pratham USA, the U.S. arm of one of the largest and most successful NGOs in India, focused on innovative interventions to address gaps in the education system through philanthropic and community based programs.

== Discography ==
Navaratna was released on iTunes on March 5, 2015, by Padmasheel Productions. The nine songs in the album include, “Pongal”, “Holi”, “Baisakhi”, “Eid”, “Janamashtami”, “Ganesh Chaturthi”, “Durga Puja”, “Diwali”, and “Christmas”. The Album is executive produced by AR Rahman and musically arranged by Ranjit Barot.

In August 2020, Ila released ILA - The Earth Symphony. The nine-track album features compositions sung in both Sanskrit and Hindi, offering harmonic layers of Bharativa as well as Western musical orchestrations. The album was recorded at Abbey Road studio. The single, Vande Mataram, brought together 75 musicians to commemorate India's 74th Independence Day.

== Personal life ==
Paliwal is married to Dinesh Paliwal, former president and CEO of HARMAN. The Paliwals, and their two children, are now based in New York and Greenwich, Connecticut.

== Awards ==
2015 Women of Distinction Award: Children Hope India

2016 Breakthrough Changemaker Inspiration Award: Breakthrough

2017 Outstanding achiever of the Indian-American community in Connecticut: The Global Organisation of People of Indian Origin Connecticut chapter

2018 RoundGlass Music Awards: Best World Music Song (Holi)
