= Ratnakar Pai =

Background information
- Birth name: Ratnakar Pai
- Born: 27 August 1928; Mumbai, Bombay Presidency, British India
- Origin: Mumbai, India
- Died: 9 August 2009 (aged 80); Mumbai, Maharashtra, India
- Genres: Khayal, Bhajans, Thumris
- Occupation: Hindustani classical
- Instrument: Vocals
- Years active: 1943–2008

Pandit Ratnakar Pai (27 August 1928 – 9 August 2009) was a Hindustani classical music vocalist of the Jaipur-Atrauli Gharana.

== Early life ==
Pai received musical training from two erudite teachers, Mohanrao Palekar and Utd. Gulubhai Jasdanwalla. Pai's was regarded as the foremost authority on the Jaipur-Atrauli Gharana because he represented a union of the two sub-streams of the Jaipur-Atrauli Gharana, having learnt from descendants of Gharana founder Utd. Alladiya Khan and from the foremost, non-blood-related disciples of the Ustad. Pai was instrumental in clarifying the differences and enhancing the wholesomeness of the Gharana's ideology.

== Career ==
Although Pai did not take to a full-fledged performance career, Pai was regarded as an expert on Khayal by musicians and musical connoisseurs. Pai's primary focus was teaching, where his many successful students are evidence of his musical stature.

=== Interpretation of the Jaipur-Atrauli Gayaki ===
Endowed with a sweet voice and an uncanny sense of laya (tempo), Pai's singing is one of the purest expressions of the traditional Jaipur-Atrauli Gayaki. The aesthetics of the gayaki are based on the solid foundation of compositions that delineate the nuances of a Raag accompanied by a syncopated approach to laya. The balance of melody and rhythm is tightly woven and the appeal is distinct to the structural and intellectual aspects of creativity, with emphasis on precision, clean and bold strokes and balance, rather than on frills, decoration and technical showmanship.

According to Pai-Buwa, our Khayals are not intended, specifically, for performance in any particular Tala or even at a particular tempo. They can be sung in any tala, and at any tempo.

— Smt. Ashwini Bhide-Deshpande

== Death ==
Pai died on the evening of 9 August 2009. He was not keeping good health and underwent an operation for gangrene several months prior.

== Students ==
Pai has taught many successful musicians, including Jitendra Abhisheki, Bhalchandra G. Tilak, Dr. Milind Malshe, Mrs. Shalmalee Joshi, and Smt. Ashwini Bhide-Deshpande.
