= Manjiri Asanare–Kelkar =

Indian classical vocalist (born 1971)

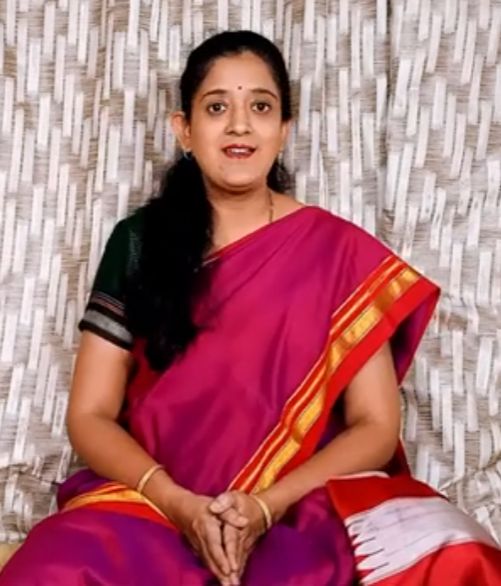
- Born: 25 September 1971 (age 54); Sangli, Maharashtra, India
- Occupation: Singer
- Awards: Kumar Gandharva Samman; Ustad Bismillah Khan Yuva Puraskar
- Musical career
- Genres: Hindustani classical music
- Instrument: Vocals
- Website: www.manjiriasanare-kelkar.com

Manjiri Asanare–Kelkar (born 1971) is an Indian Hindustani classical vocalist from Sangli, Maharashtra. She is a follower of Jaipur-Atrauli gharana tradition in Hindustani khyal. She received many awards including Ustad Bismillah Khan Yuva Puraskar by Sangeet Natak Akademi and Kumar Gandharva Samman by the government of Madhya Pradesh.

== Biography ==
Manjiri Asanare-Kelkar was born on 25 September 1971, into a family of musicians in Sangli, Maharashtra. Her father Anand Asanare was a Tabla player. She began studying vocal music at the age of six, first under M.T. Mhaiskar and Madhusudan Kanetkar, and later under Padma Talwalkar and the late Kishori Amonkar. Her first music teacher, Mhaiskar, taught her the basic fundamentals of the Khyal. Her later guru Kanetkar initially refused to accept her as his disciple, but after hearing Manjiri sing at the age of 18, he agreed to teach her on a trial basis for six months. This guru-shishya style of study continued and she trained under him for almost 20 years.

Manjiri graduated with a postgraduate degree in English literature and masters degree in music.

== Career ==
In Hindustani classical music, Manjiri is a follower of Jaipur-Atrauli gharana tradition in khyal. Manjiri has performed at many music festivals across India including the Sawai Gandharva Bhimsen Festival, Tansen Samaroha,and Takshila Utsav and Shankarlal Festival. Other than singing in various stages across India, she also toured to Dubai, United Kingdom, Holland, Belgium, Australia and New Zealand.

Manjiri is an approved A-grade vocal artist of the All India Radio. She is also a trained Kathak dancer.

== Awards and honors ==
Manjiri received many awards and honors including Music Scholarship by the Ministry of Human Resource Development, Government of India, Surashree Kesarbai Kerkar Scholarship instituted by National Centre for the Performing Arts, Mumbai, Ustad Bismillah Khan Yuva Puraskar by Sangeet Natak Akademi, the Gaan Hira award by the SNDT Women's University, the Kumar Gandharva Samman by the government of Madhya Pradesh, Sanskriti Award from the Sanskriti Pratishthan in Delhi, and the Gaan Saraswati Puraskar.

The India Today news magazine has described her voice as the "voice that spans not merely two octaves, but two centuries".
