= Manik Bhide =

- Born: 1935; Kolhapur, Kolhapur State, British Raj
- Died: 13 September 2023 (aged 88)
- Genres: Khayal, Bhajans, Thumris
- Occupation: Hindustani classical vocalist
- Instrument: Vocals
- Years active: 1960s–2023

Manik Govind Bhide (1935 – 13 September 2023) was an Indian Hindustani classical music vocalist from Kolhapur and based in Mumbai. She was known for being Kishori Amonkar's student and Ashwini Bhide-Deshpande's guru and mother. She was an exponent of the Jaipur-Atrauli gharana.

== Early life and training ==
Born Manik Potnis in Kolhapur, she was encouraged by her parents to learn music. She began her early classical training with Madhukar Sadolikar of the Jaipur-Atrauli gharana.

Later, she married scientist Govind Bhide. Following, around 1964, the couple relocated to Mumbai. A family friend, Vamanrao Deshpande, brought the young couple to meet Mogubai Kurdikar, his guru. Though Kurdikar wasn't present, Manik Bhide met Kishori Amonkar and soon became her student after the former heard the latter sing. She continued to learn from Amonkar for 15 years. Bhide learned alongside Suhasini Mulgaonkar, Arun Dravid, Meera Panshikar, and others.

=== Training with Kishori Amonkar ===
Though a devout follower and admirer of Amonkar, Bhide's relationship with her guru was challenging and demanding. Under tremendous stress and Amonkar's infamous temperamentality. Bhide had accompanied Amonkar in every concert for over a decade. After a falling out, Bhide discontinued learning from Amonkar in 1981. Following, she dedicated her musical life to teaching. After several decades, Bhide and Amonkar reconciled.

== Career ==
Bhide performed at most major music conferences in India and was a regular performer for All India Radio.

== Students ==
Bhide was a well known Guru of her Gharana legacy. At the urging of Mogubai Kurdikar, Bhide began teaching her daughter, Ashwini, the Jaipur-Atrauli gayaki. She had also taught many other students which include Geetika Varde, Dr. Jyoti Kale, Sveta Hattangdi Kilpady, Dr. Nishad Matange, Meenal Bhide, Maya Dharmadhikari, Sandhaya Deshmukh and Priti Talwalkar and many others.

== Death ==
Manik Bhide died on 13 September 2023, at the age of 88.

== Discography ==
- The Sanctity of Parampara (1987; Rhythm House) – Raag Nayaki Kanada, Raag Bihag. Featuring Baban Manjrekar (harmonium), Omkar Gulvady (tabla), Vandana Shirodkar (tanpura). Recorded by Avinash Oak.

== Accolades ==
- 2018 – Bharat Ratna Pt. Bhimsen Joshi Jeevan Gaurav Puraskar, presented by Arvind Parikh
