= Wamanrao Sadolikar =

- Born: 16 September 1907; Kolhapur, Bombay Presidency, British India
- Origin: Kolhapur, India
- Died: 25 March 1991 (aged 83) Mumbai, Maharashtra, India
- Genres: Khayal, Bhajans, Thumris
- Occupation: Hindustani classical vocalist of the Jaipur-Atrauli Gharana
- Instrument: Vocals
- Years active: 1920–1980

Pandit Wamanrao Sadolikar (16 September 1907 – 25 March 1991) was a Hindustani classical vocalist of the Jaipur-Atrauli Gharana founded by his guru, Utd. Alladiya Khan.

== Early life ==
Pt. Wamanrao Sadolikar was born into a family of music lovers in Kolhapur. As a teenager, he studied classical music under Pt. V. D. Paluskar of the Gwalior Gharana.

== Career ==
Sadolikar's career put him into many roles on the stages of Marathi Natya Sangeet, as a singer-actor, a music director and a director. He also had several film appearances. He studied music under Utd. Bhurji Khan and Utd. Alladiya Khan, and he instructed his brother, Madhukar Sadolikar, his daughter Smt. Shruti Sadolikar-Katkar, and Smt. Manjiri Kavre-Alegaonkar.

== Awards and recognition ==
- 1938 – Sangeet Praveen by Gandharva Mahavidyalaya, Lahore.
- ITC SRA Fellowship
- Balgandharv Suvarna Padak by the Marathi Natya Parishad.
