= Alladiya Khan =

Classical music singer (1855-1946)

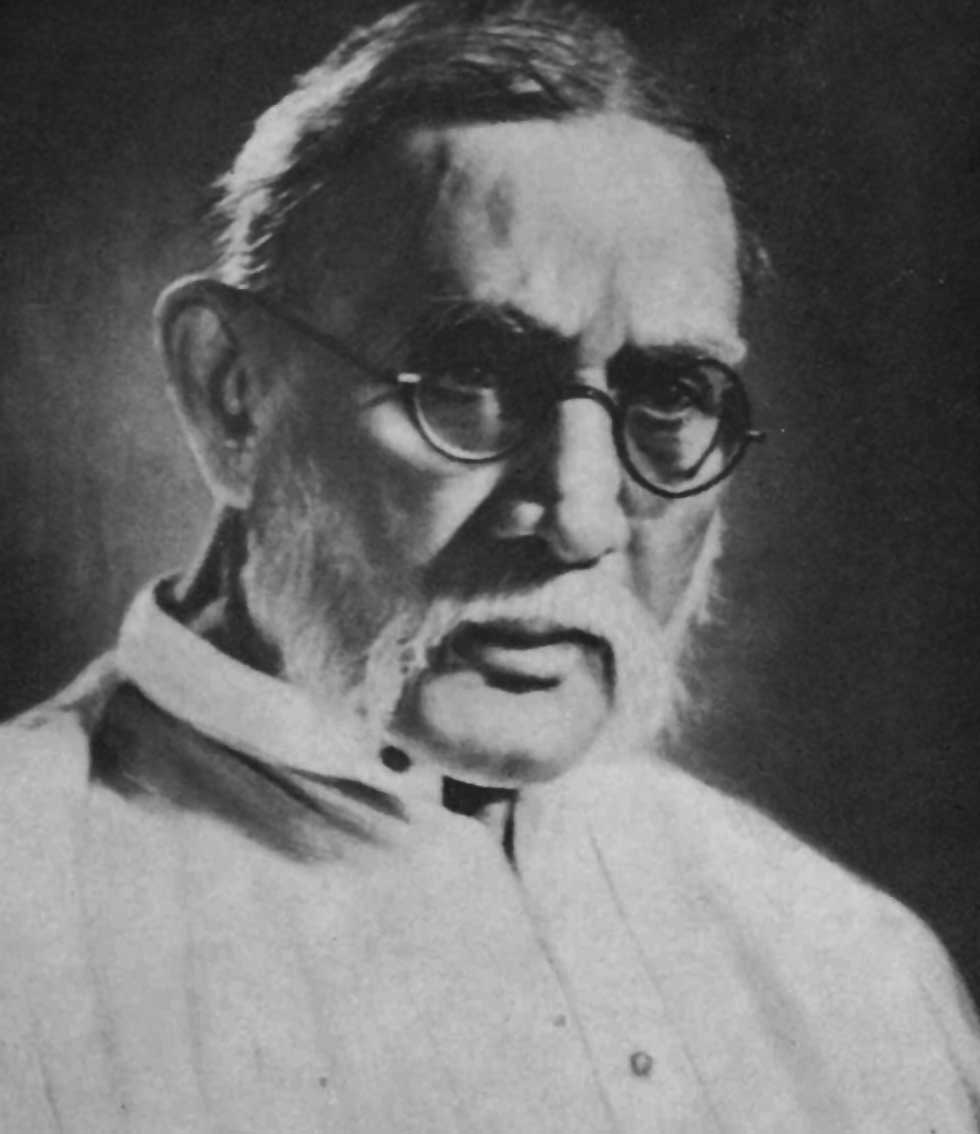

Background information
- Born: Ghulam Ahmad Khan; 10 August 1855; Uniara, British India
- Origin: Atrauli, Uttar Pradesh
- Died: 16 March 1946 (aged 90) Bombay, Bombay Presidency, British India
- Genres: Dhrupad, Dhamar, Khayal,
- Occupation: singer of classical music
- Years active: 1870 – 1944

Alladiya Khan (10 August 1855 – 16 March 1946) was an Indian Hindustani classical singer who founded the Jaipur-Atrauli gharana, also referred to as just Jaipur Gharana. He is recognized for his revival, reinterpretation, and creations of many rare raags, compositions, and techniques and for producing disciples like Bhaskarbuwa Bakhale, Kesarbai Kerkar, and Mogubai Kurdikar.

== Background ==
Alladiya Khan was born on 10 August 1855, at Uniara, a small village in Tonk, Rajasthan, (then under the Jaipur State) to a Shia Muslim family of musicians.

=== Ancestry ===
Khan claimed ancestry from Nath Vishwambhar, an ancestor of Swami Haridas. Having converted to Islam during the Mughal era, Khan's family traces its history to the Gaud Brahmins of Shandilya gotra.

=== Musical training ===
Though his father Ahmed Khan died early in his life, Khan's uncle, Jehangir (of Jaipur), taught him dhrupad for 5 years and then khyal for another 8 years. Khan would practice palta exercises for six hours daily well into his 50s.

== Career ==
Alladiya Khan served in the court of various kings of Rajasthan, including that of Amlata.

=== Setback ===
Due to overextension of the voice at the request of his patron, Khan lost his voice in his late 30s for nearly two years. His recuperated voice is said to have not regained the quality and sensitivity he could call upon earlier. These limitations resulted in the conception of what would become the Jaipur gayaki.

=== Touring ===
Khan traveled to Bihar, Patna, Allahabad, Nepal, and Baroda for some years in the early part of his life to perform for kings.

=== Kolhapur (1895 - 1922) ===
Later, Khan settled down in Kolhapur with his family as the court musician of Shahu Maharaj.

=== Mumbai ===
In 1922, he moved to Mumbai after the king died. He taught many disciples and sang in many mehfils in Mumbai. There, he grew fond of 'natya sangeet' singers like Balgandharva and continued to teach his students until his death. Alladiya Khan died in Bombay on 16 March 1946.

His autobiography, as narrated to his grandson Azizzudin Khan Sahab, is available in English translation, as My Life, with an introduction by Amlan Das Gupta and Urmila Bhirdikar, published by Thema, Kolkata, 2000.

== Musicianship ==
=== Repertoire ===
Alladiya Khan was acknowledged for his creation and resurrection of many complex Raags such as Nat Kamod, Bhoop Nat, Kaunsi Kanada, Sampoorna Malkauns, Basanti Kedar, Shuddha Nat, Malavi, Savani Kalyan, DhavalaShree.

Many of these Raags were sung in the Havelis in northern Rajasthan, where Khansahab grew up. From Haveli Sangeet tradition, Khansahab brought many of the Raags in the realm of live concerts and also created Raags and Bandishes rooted in them. One of the Raags he resurrected was Raag Basanti Kanada. Few of the many Haveli sangeet dhrupads which he made into bandishes were the famous Raag Nayaki Kanada Bandish "Mero Piya Rasiya" and Bihagda Bandish "Ae Pyaari pag hole". "Khan Saheb had never allowed his voice to be recorded."

=== Students ===
Khansahab's major disciples were Azmat Hussain Khan, his own younger brother Haider Khan (also spelled Hyder Khan), his own sons, Manji Khan and Bhurji Khan, and his grandson Azizuddin Khansahab.

Apart from the members of his family, Khansahab's initial disciples were Tanibai Ghorpade, Bhaskarbuwa Bakhale, Kesarbai Kerkar, Mogubai Kurdikar, Govindrao Shaligram, and Gulubhai Jasdanwalla.

==== Extension of legacy ====
Alladiya Khan's students played a major part in extending the influence of Jaipur Gharana.

Alladiya Khan's eldest son, Nasiruddin "Badeji" Khan (1886 – 1966), could not pursue singing as a profession because of health reasons, so Manji Khan and Bhurji Khan took forward the tradition. Manji Khan, Alladiya Khan's second son, had started teaching Mallikarjun Mansur in 1935, but Manji Khan died in 1937 (around March 1937); so it was Bhurji Khan, the youngest son, who passed on the gayaki of his father.Pt. Wamanrao Sadolikar, Mallikarjun Mansur and Dhondutai Kulkarni are among the noted disciples of Bhurji Khan. Gajanan-buwa Joshi of Agra Gharana also received guidance from Bhurji Khan. Haider Khan's disciples included Mogubai Kurdikar, Laxmibai Jadhav, and his son Naththan Khan. Noted musicologist Vamanrao Deshpande was Naththan Khan's student. But Naththan Khan died in 1946, just a few weeks after Alladiya Khan's death. Mogibai Kurdikar's students include famous names like her daughter Kishori Amonkar, musicologist Vamanrao Deshpande, Kausalya Manjeshwar, Padma Talwalkar.

== Legacy ==
=== Students ===
Khan taught many disciples, several of whom achieved regional and international recognition. These include:

- Haider Khan, younger brother
- Bhaskarbuwa Bakhale
- Govindbuwa Shaligram
- Govindrao Tembe
- Wamanrao Sadolikar
- Tribhuvandas Jariwala
- Shankarrao Sarnaik
- Abdul Majid Khan, sarangiya
- Qamaruddin "Natthan" Khan, nephew (son of Haider Khan)
- Nasiruddin "Badeji" Khan, eldest son
- Badruddin "Manji" Khan, middle son
- Shamsuddin "Bhurji" Khan, youngest son
- Kesarbai Kerkar
- Mogubai Kurdikar
- Gulubhai Jasdanwalla
- Tanibai Ghorpade "Ghorpadebai"
- Leelabai Shirgaonkar
- Sushila Rani Patel
- "Baba" Azizuddin Khan, grandson (son of Bhurji Khan)
- Nivruttibuwa Sarnaik

=== Ragas ===
Khan authored or revived many ragas. These include:

- Raga Sampurna Malkauns
- Raga Basanti Kedar, a jod raga of Basant and Kedar
- Raga Savani Nat, a jod raga of Savani and Shuddha Nat.
- Raga Savani Kalyan, a jod raga of Savani and Yaman.
- Raga Bhoop Nat, a jod raga of Bhoopali and Shuddha Nat.
- Raga Pat Bihag, a jod raga of Patdeep and Bihag.
- Raga Daguri
- Raga Godhani
- Raga Gaud Lalit
- Raga Uniyari

=== Compositions ===
Khan was known to have composed khayals, dhrupads, and dhamars that have become staples for the Jaipur-Atrauli repertoire and certain ragas. These include:

- Raga Maligaura khayal in madhyalaya teentala, "Darasa sarasa deta dukha bisarana ko."
- Raga Barari khayal in vilambit teentala, "Kaise kara āūṃ re."
- Raga Barari khayal in vilambit teentala, "So jāna re meharbāna."
- Raga Vihang khayal in vilambit teentala, "Ālī tai kīnī moso āja nayī chaturāī."
- Raga Shuddha Kalyan khayal in vilambit ada chautala, "Alī mohe manāvana piyaravā."
- Raga Khem Kalyan khayal in vilambit ikwai, "Bālamavā tuma bina raina dinā."
- Raga Jait Kalyan khayal in vilambit teentala, "E samajha manā."
- Raga Hem Nat khayal in vilambit teentala, "Re karatāra Karīma."
- Raga Shankara khayal in vilambit teentala, "Anāhata nāda ko bheda nā pāyo."
- Raga Daguri khayal in vilambit rupak, "Ālī rī bīra Mohana."
- Raga Jaijaiwanti khayal in jhaptala, "E ālī piyā āe mere."
- Raga Sindhura khayal in vilambit teentala, "Ālī rī mere āe piyaravā."
- Raga Sorath khayal in jhaptala, "Sakhī bina piyā more jiyā kal nāhī."
- Raga Desh khayal in vilambit teentala, "Sakhī Mohana Mohanī dārī."
- Raga Jhinjhoti khayal in ada chautala, "Erī ālī bhāga jāge jāge."
- Raga Malkauns khayal in vilambit teentala, "E mana rabā sāī."
- Raga Kaushi Kanada (Nayaki-anga) in vilambit teentala or rupak, "Ālī rī jāe kaho."
- Raga Adana khayal in jhaptala, "Mubāraka ho."
- Raga Bhankar khayal in rupak, "Ek same harane Hara ke."
- Raga Malavi khayal in jhaptala, "Anga sugandha ranga rupa ko."
- Raga Gaud Lalit khayal in vilambit teentala, "Saba rasika āna mile."
- Raga Uniyari khayal in vilambit teentala, "Ranga mahal rama raho manabhāvana."
- Raga Hussaini Kanada khayal in vilambir teentala, "Nirākāra karatā."
- Raga Kukubh Bilawal khayal in jhaptala, "Dhana āja dulhā."
- Raga Patmanjari khayal in vilambit teentala, "Bāīn ānkha morī."
- Raga Khambavati khayal in madhyalaya teentala, "Eri māī piyā ajahun na āe."

=== Music Festivals ===
The Annual Ustad Alladiya Khan Music Festival is celebrated in Mumbai and Dharwad each year, where several singers and musicians perform, giving homage to Alladiya Khan.

=== Recordings ===
Khan was adamant about not having his voice and style recorded for fear of copyright. Though, there have been suspicions that ambiguous recordings may belong to Khan or his kin. A recording of a thumri is alleged to be featuring Khan singing.

=== In popular culture ===
In 2007, the story of Dhondutai Kulkarni, disciple of the legendary Bhurji Khan, was the subject of Namita Devidayal's debut novel, The Music Room.
