= Gauri Pathare =

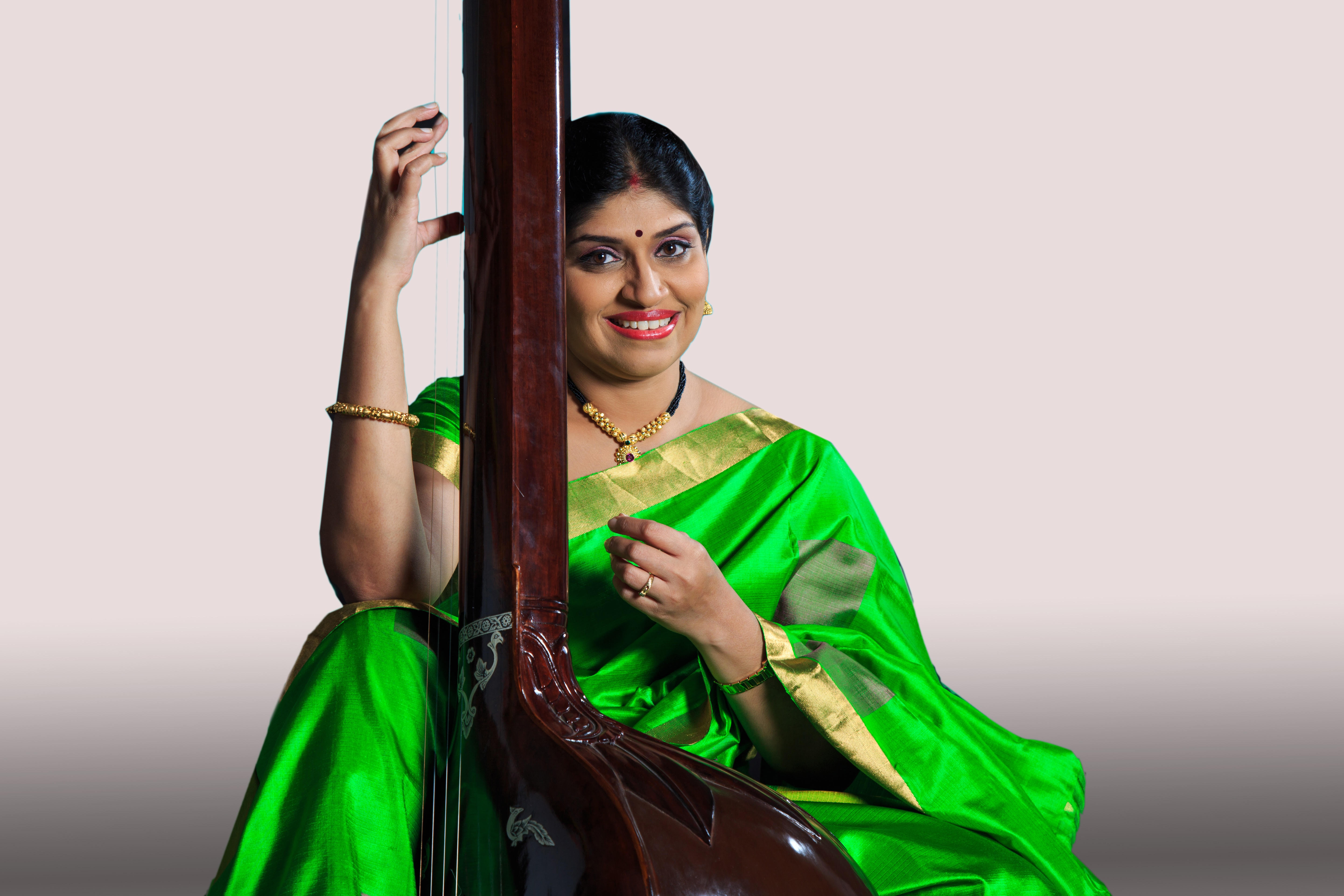
Gauri Pathare

Gauri Pathare is an Indian musician and a winner of the All India Radio competition.

== Personal life ==
Gauri Pathare holds a degree in Computer Science from the University of Pune and a Diploma in IT from NIIT. During her early years, she won numerous inter-collegiate, inter-university and inter-state trophies. She also won the All India Radio competition.

Pathare was the vocal accompaniment to Pt. Suresh Talwalkar for his taal maala concerts in her initial years. In addition to singing, Pathare has been interested in cooking and has appeared on a number of cookery shows.

== Training ==
Having initially trained under the guidance of Pt. Gangadharbuwa Pimpalkhare of Kirana gharana, Pathare received knowledge in music from late Pt. Jitendra Abhisheki and Pandita Padmatai Talwalkar for several years. Since 2010, she has been receiving Jaipur gharana training under Pt. Arun Dravid. Her training under different Gurus influenced her gayaki. She has trained in the 3 Gharanas - Jaipur-Atrauli gharana, Gwalior gharana and Kirana Gharana.

Gauri has blended Jaipur, Gwalior and Kirana Gharana gayaki to form her own style of Khyal presentation. She has been trained in various voice culture techniques by Ustaad Syeeduddin Daagar (cousin of Wasifuddin Dagar), a noted Dhrupad Dhamar singer.

== Performances ==
Gauri has performed at most of the prestigious classical music festivals in India including Sawai Gandharva Mahotsav, Tansen festival, Chandigarh Sangeet Sammelan, Kesarbai Kerkar Sammelan, Pt. Kumar Gandharva Sangeet Sammelan, etc. She has frequently performed in India, France, Switzerland, USA, Australia, Canada, Dubai, United Kingdom and Singapore.

Gauri has conducted numerous classical music workshops overseas and has had her live performances broadcast on Australian radio.

Here are some of the performances:

Rag Malhar

Rag Nand

Rag Jog

Rag Lalit

Rag: Lalitagauri

Rag:Sawani Kalyan

Rag: Hameer

Semi - classical section

Dadra--Yaad Piya ki Aaye

Rangi sari gulabi chunariya- dadra

Kaise jiya tarasat-Dadra

He Suranno Chandra Vha- natyageet

Bhairavi

Marathi-bhajan (1)

Marathi -bhajan (2)

Hindi( Nirguni) bhajan

== Awards ==
- Smt. Kesarbai Kerkar scholarship conferred by the NCPA - 2000-2001.
- Smt. Yamunadevi Shahane Puraskar by Ganwardhan, Pune - 2002
- Shree Sitaram Dixit Puraskar for Semi Classical Vocal Music - 2003
- Gyanacharya Pt. Ramakrishnabuwa Vaze Yuwa Gayak Puraskar - by Gandharva Mahavidyalaya, Pune - 2006
- Surmani Puraskar - 2006
- Sur Mani Puraskar by Sur Singar Parishad - 2007
- Album "Tribute" was nominated for Global Indian Music Awards - 2010
- Sangeet Ratna Puraskar by Kashi Gayan Samj, Varanasi - 2010
- "Swarabhaskar" Puraskar instituted in the memory of Late Pandit Bhimsen Joshi - 2012 - 2013.
- Aditya Vikram Birla "Kala Kiran Puraskar" - 2013

== Media recognition ==
- Maharashtra Times
- Meet Kalakar
- The Hindu
- The Times of India
- India Herald
- IBN Lokmat - Interview
- Afternoon Dispatch & Courier - Gauri Pathare a Verstalie Singer

== CD releases ==
Year	Album title	Label
2004	Classical Ragas Bhimpalas Shree & Hamir	Alurkar Music House
2004	Ahir Bhairav, Jaunpuri & Alhaiya Bilawal	Alurkar Music House
2005	Soothing Voice Raagas Nand & Basant	Perfect Octave Records
2005	Emotions - Ragaas Marwa & Bhhopali	Perfect Octave Records
2007	Malhar - Raagas Gaudmalhar & Surmalhar	Mystica Music
2008	Extended Inner Expression - Ragaas Nand & Bhairavi	Universal Records
2008	Shubham - Flowering Buds. Raagas Chayanat & Basant	Legendary Legacy Records
2008	Raagas - Lalitagauri & Durga	Underscore Records
2008	Raagas - Lalitagauri & Durga	Gp Records
2009	Prata: Swar - Raagas Lalit, Alaihya Bilawal & Patdeep	Dream Entertainment
2009	Sakhaya - Traditional Bhajans of Sant Tukaram	Gp Records
2009	Bandish	Mystica Music
2010	Musical Tribute to Guru Pandita Padmatai Talwalkar	Mystica Music
2016	Madhya - Laya	Meera Music
