= Gulubhai Jasdanwalla =

- Genres: Khayal, Bhajans, Thumris
- Occupation: Hindustani classical vocalist of the Jaipur-Atrauli Gharana
- Instrument: Vocals

Gulubhai Jasdanwalla was a Hindustani Classical vocalist of the Jaipur-Atrauli Gharana and one of the foremost disciples of Gharana founder Utd. Alladiya Khan.

== Background ==
From a entrepreneurial family, Gulubhai Jasdanwalla was a race horse breeder and a collector of Raags and compositions signature of the Jaipur-Atrauli Gharana. He was a successful importer-exporter in Mumbai.

== Musical career ==
Utd. Manji Khan taught him the Jaipur-Atrauli Gayaki until his death in 1937, at which point his father Utd. Alladiya Khan continued. Because of his financial success, Gulubhai Jasdanwalla was able to dedicate ample time for music and became a skilled musician. Gulubhai Jasdanwalla produced many successful disciples, including Smt. Shruti Sadolikar, and his foremost being Pt. Ratnakar Pai. Recordings of Gulubhai Jasdanwalla's private performances have been kept by friends and colleagues.

== Discography ==
- Samarpan: Tribute to Jaipur-Atrauli Gharana
