= Khaprumama Parvatkar =

Indian musician (1880–1953)

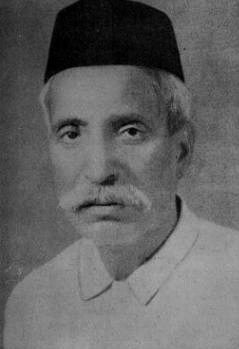

Background information
- Born: Laxman Parvatkar; 1879
- Died: 3 September 1953 (aged 72–73)
- Instruments: Tabla, Mridangam, Ghumot and other rhythmic instruments

Khaprumama Parvatkar (1880 – 3 September 1953), born Laxman, was an Indian percussionist and classical musician celebrated for his extraordinary mastery over rhythm (layakari). Born and deceased in Chandreshwar-Parvat, he came from a family with a multi-generational heritage in the musical arts. He was highly proficient across several traditional instruments, including the tabla, mridangam, sarangi, and regional Goan percussion.

== Early life and training ==
Laxman Parvatkar grew up in an environment deeply rooted in musical traditions. He began his musical education under the guidance of his maternal uncle, Raghuvir Parvatkar, who taught him how to play the sarangi. He went on to study the pakhawaj under his paternal uncles, Harischandra Parvatkar and Ramkrishna Parvatkar. He also received rigorous training in the Dhrupad-Dhamar style of singing from the Dhrupad vocalist Anantbuwa Dhavalikar. Parvatkar initially launched his public performance career by playing the ghumat, a widely popular percussion instrument in Goa, which he mastered with exceptional skill.

== Musical career and innovations ==
Parvatkar earned widespread renown for his expertise as a tabla and mridangam player. While undergoing his foundational training in tabla, he became fascinated by the mathematical principles of tempo and rhythm (laya). He questioned why rhythm could only be divided into standard even proportions—such as double (dugun), triple (tigun), and quadruple (chaugun) speeds—and set out to develop theories establishing rhythm in odd proportions. This intense focus on the science of rhythm (talashastra) led him to step away from other pursuits.

In his early career, he regularly accompanied numerous celebrated male and female vocalists on both the tabla and the sarangi. His deep understanding of rhythm culminated in several complex musical creations:

- Parabrahmataal: An original rhythmic cycle created by Parvatkar consisting of 15.75 (paunesola) beats, which he developed into a structurally complete eight-part framework (ashtangaparipurna).
- Mahasudarshan: A highly intricate percussion composition (paran) set within the Parabrahmataal framework, featuring exactly 125 distinct Dha beats.

Over his lifetime, Parvatkar memorized thousands of rhythmic openings (mukhdas) and independently composed hundreds of specialized rhythmic patterns, including gatis, relas, todas, and parans.

He was particularly famous for executing highly complex polyrhythmic feats simultaneously. During a single performance, he could maintain Teental with one foot, Jhaptal with the other foot, a steady rhythm with one hand, and Chautal with the other hand, while concurrently reciting the rhythmic phrase (theka) of the Sawari tala with his mouth. Furthermore, he could vocally recite three cycles of a specific rhythmic phrase while simultaneously playing the exact phrase five times on the tabla, perfectly matching the primary downbeat (sam) of both forms without altering his underlying tempo.

== Recognition and titles ==
Parvatkar's unique skills were widely acknowledged by the leading stalwarts of Indian classical music through various programs and honours:

- 1919: At a music conference organized by Vishnu Digambar Paluskar, Parvatkar gave his first major demonstration solving complex riddles of rhythm, winning the admiration of prominent tabla and pakhawaj players from across India.
- 1921: Following a demonstration of diverse rhythmic styles at a concert organized by Bhaskarbuwa Bakhale, Bakhale presented him with an honorary certificate conferring the title "Layashastrantlo Prabhu" (Lord of the Science of Rhythm).
- 1933: At a grand concert held in Mumbai, he received high praise from legendary musicians including Sangeet Samrat Alladiya Khan, Vilayat Hussain Khan, Faiyaz Khan (Aftab-e-Musiqi), and Aman Ali Khan.
- 1935: Classical vocalist Mogubai Kurdikar commissioned a custom bust of Parvatkar and presented it to him at a formal ceremony. At this event, traditional masters from Hyderabad analyzed his rhythmic mastery and honored him with the title "Lay kshetrantlo talpato surya" (The Shining Sun in the Field of Rhythm).
- 1939: Mumbai-based artists organized a felicitation to celebrate his lifelong dedication to music, where Alladiya Khan formally bestowed upon him the title of "Layabrahmabhaskar".
- Regional honours: In his native Goa, local art connoisseurs honored him with the title "Taalkanthamani". Later, on 24 August 1948, a grand felicitation was held in Pune under the chairmanship of Barrister Babasaheb Jaykar.

A commercial sound recording of his percussion playing was also produced and released by the "Young India" company.

== Disciples ==
Parvatkar passed on his knowledge of melody (swara) and rhythm (tala) to the next generation of musicians. His primary disciples included his son, Ramkrishna Parvatkar, as well as Balkrishna Parvatkar and Dattaram Parvatkar. Additionally, he provided musical training to the eminent vocalist Mogubai Kurdikar and the Goan cultural patron Dr. Malbarao Sardesai.

His fifteen-and-half beat Tabla was unique. Mogubai Kurdikar used it for Raga singing.
