= Kumar Gandharva Samman =

Indian music award

The Kumar Gandharva Samman is an Indian annual award for outstanding talent in the field of music established by the government of Madhya Pradesh in 1992. It is named after Kumar Gandharva, a classical singer.

== Selection criteria ==
Performers of Indian classical music, Carnatic music, and Hindustani classical music between the ages of 25 and 45 are considered for the award each year. Nominations are filed with the state's department of culture, and a committee of experts makes the final decision.

== Recipients ==
Recipients of the Kumar Gandharva Samman are given a scroll of honour and a cash prize.

List of recipients
| Name | Year | Ref. |
|---|---|---|
| Ajoy Chakrabarty | 1992–1993 | |
| Budhaditya Mukherjee | 1993–1994 | |
| Rajan and Sajan Mishra | 1994–1995 | |
| Narasimhan Ravikiran | 1995–1996 | |
| Mukul Shivputra | 1996–1997 | |
| Shahid Parvez | 1997–1998 | |
| Umakant & Ramakant Gundecha | 1998–1999 | |
| E. Gayathri | 1999–2000 | |
| Uday Bhawalkar | 2000–2001 | |
| Shujaat Khan | 2001–2002 | |
| Rashid Khan | 2002–2003 | |
| U. Srinivas | 2003–2004 | |
| Ashwini Bhide-Deshpande | 2004–2005 | |
| Ronu Majumdar | 2005–2006 | |
| Arati Ankalikar Tikekar | 2006–2007 | |
| Kala Ramnath | 2007–2008 | |
| Sanjeev Abhyankar | 2008–2009 | |
| Kamala Shankar | 2009–2010 | |
| Satish Vyas | 2010–2011 | |
| None | 2011–2012 | |
| Rama Vaidyanathan | 2012–2013 | |
| Manjiri Asanare-Kelkar | 2013–2014 | |
| Bahauddin Dagar | 2014–2015 | |
| Kapila Venu | 2015–2016 | |
| Manjusha Kulkarni-Patil | 2016–2017 | |
| Niladri Kumar | 2017–2018 | |
| Niladri Kumar | 2018–2019 | |
| Meeta Pandit | 2019–2020 | |
| Debopriya and Suchismita Chatterjee | 2020–2021 | |
