= Vasanti Muzumdar =

Marathi writer

Vasanti Muzumdar (1939–2003) was a Marathi writer from Maharashtra, India.

== Early life ==
She was born in 1939 in Karad, Maharashtra. She studied at Fergusson College in Pune to obtain a bachelor's degree from Pune University and obtained a master's degree from SNDT Women's University. Muzumdar played an important role in founding the institution Granthali (ग्रंथाली) aimed at publishing books and spreading knowledge in Maharashtra via different means.

== Literary work ==
=== Collections of poems ===
- Sahela Re (सहेला रे)
- Sanehi (सनेही)

=== Collections of essays ===
- Nadikathi (नदीकाठी)
- Jhalal (झळाळ)

== Awards ==
Muzumdar's works received Damani Puraskar (दमाणी पुरस्कार), Sane Guruji Puraskar (सानेगुरुजी पुरस्कार), Bahinabai Chaudhari Puraskar (बहिणाबाई चौधरी पुरस्कार), and a few Maharashtra state literary awards.
