= Raghunandan Panshikar =

Pt. Raghunandan Panshikar पं. रघुनंदन पणशीकर
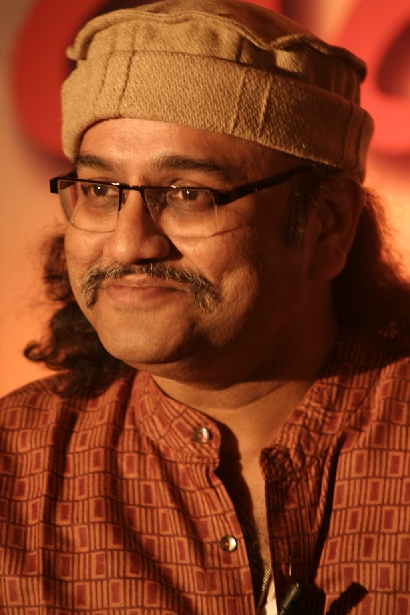
- Pt. Raghunandan Panshikar

Background information
- Born: 14 March 1963 (age 63); Mumbai, Maharashtra, India
- Origin: India
- Genres: Hindustani classical music, Jaipur Gharana, Ghazal, Thumari, Natya Sangeet
- Occupation: Classical vocalist
- Instrument: Vocals
- Years active: 1991–present
- Labels: Raghunandan Panshikar, Sony Music, Times Music, Saregama, Vale Entertainment, Myuzic Entertainment, Mystica Music Pvt. Ltd.
- Website: www.raghunandanpanshikar.com

Raghunandan Panshikar (born 1963) is a Hindustani classical vocalist. He has received training in the Jaipur gharana Panshikar has established his own unique treatment to classical singing under tutelage of Kishori Aamonkar, which diverted from traditional Jaipur-Atrauli Gharana. A versatile artist, he sings semi classical forms like Bhajans, Thumris, Gazals and Natya Sangeet with panache. Recipient of several prestigious awards, Panshikar has made his mark in performances throughout India as well as in Europe, the United States and the Middle east.

== Early life ==
Panshikar was born into a family of Sanskrit scholars and classical musicians. He is the son of the eminent Marathi stage actor and producer Prabhakar Panshikar. Panshikar's aptitude for music was recognized and fostered from an early age. He began his formal study of music in Mumbai at the age of eleven. He learned music from the late Vasantrao Kulkarni for two years. Later he took training from the doyen of Jaipur gharana, Kishori Amonkar from the age of 17, over next 20–22 years. During this time, Raghunandan had the rare fortune to be guided by Kishori Tai's mother, Mogubai Kurdikar.

== Career ==
Albums as a Music Composer/Director and Vocalist
Year	Album/Song	Label
31 December 1991	The Feminine Power	Saregama
12 January 1998	Bhoopnat Niranjani	Saregama
10 July 2004	Morning Mantras	Vale Entertainment Ltd
10 July 2004	Chants from Himalayan Peaks	Vale Entertainment Ltd
15 October 2004	Janak Thaat Bilaval	Times Music
6 July 2005	Hanuman Dhun	Vale Entertainment Ltd
8 July 2007	Shree Ganesh Vandana	Vale Entertainment Ltd
	ManasPuja and Devi	Saregama
	Omkaranand Darshanam	Raghunandan Panshikar
	Omkaranand Vandanam	Raghunandan Panshikar
	More Sawariya ( A type of fusion music)	Sony Music
18 September 2008	Healing Mantras For Insomnia	Times Music
26 February 2009	Inner Voice Signature Shlok by pt. Jasraj	Times Music
26 February 2009	Geeta Saar	Times Music
12 August 2009	Hidden Gems (Classical)	Mystica Music Pvt Ltd
11 July 2012	The series of health mantra by Times Music	Times Music
15 February 2013	Kabir Amrit Vani	Times Music
12 March 2013	Drishti by Kishori Amonkar (1 Song)	
6 December 2015	Shri Hanuman – Golden Collection	Myuzic Entertainment
12 December 2015	Mahadev – Golden Collection	Myuzic Entertainment
12 January 2016	Shri Gayatri Chalisa	Myuzic Entertainment
16 February 2016	Tapsa Ganesh	Myuzic Entertainment

== Awards ==
- Smt.Manik Varma Puraskar
- Upadhye Smriti Puraskar for contribution in Indian Classical Music
- He has been awarded by Swaryogini Dr. Prabha Atre award from Gaanvardhan & Tatyasaheb Natu foundation Pune, for his significant achievements and performing career.

== Achievements ==
- (Best Music Direction)For The Musical Drama 'Avgha Rang Ekachi Zala'
- Z Gaurav Puraskar
- Ma.Taa.(Maharashtra Times) Sanman
- An Award from Maharashtra State
- Ramkrishnabua Vaze Puraskar

== See also ==
- Kishori Amonkar
