= Amlan Das Gupta =

Indian academic

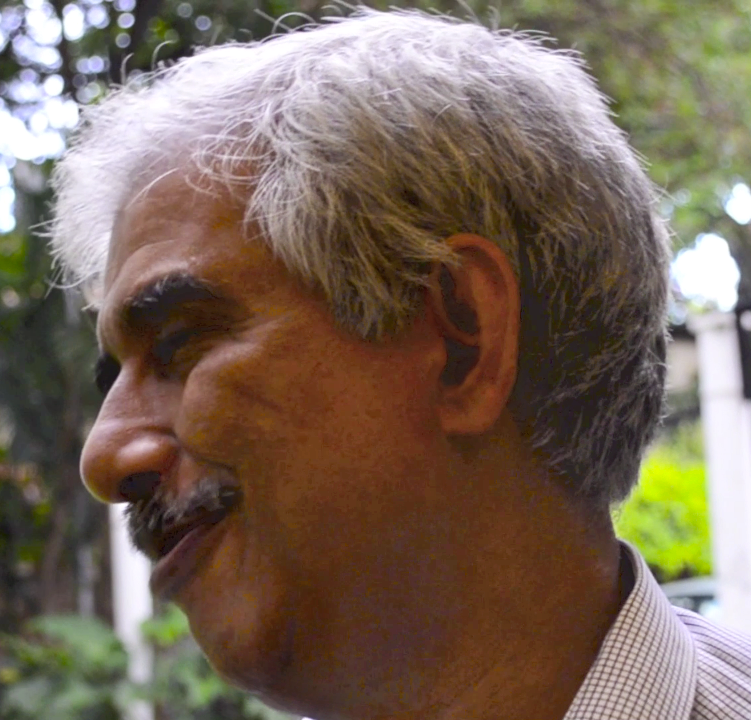
- Amlan Das Gupta in Bangalore.
- Born: Kolkata
- Writing career
- Language: English
- Notable works: Renaissance Texts and Contexts

Amlan Das Gupta is former professor of English, Jadavpur University, Kolkata. He is a noted scholar of Classical and Biblical Studies, English Renaissance literature and an authority on Miltonic studies in India having numerous publications to his credit.

He earned his B.A.(Hons.) from Presidency College of the University of Calcutta and went on to pursue the M.A. at Jadavpur University. He received an M.Phil. from Oxford University and did his Ph.D. from Jadavpur University. After teaching at Scottish Church College and the University of Calcutta, he joined the faculty of Jadavpur University.

He taught courses ranging from Classical and Arthurian Studies to Pre-Modern and Modern Literature. He learnt Latin and Greek from Raymond Pilette, Jesuit father of St Xavier's College, Calcutta. He gave lessons in these languages to interested students outside the university curriculum.

He built an archive of North Indian classical music at the School of Cultural Texts and Records at Jadavpur University. He also offered a course on the history of North Indian Classical Music.

== Publications ==
=== Books ===
Jishu (Kolkata: Papyrus, 1997);

My Life: Khansaheb Alladiya Khan (translated with critical introduction, with Urmila Bhirdikar) (Kolkata: Thema, 2000).;

Mosquito and Other Stories: Ghana-da's Tall Tales (a translation of the Ghonada stories of Premendra Mitra) (New Delhi: Penguin, 2004);

editions of Shakespeare's Measure for Measure (New Delhi: Macmillan, 2004)

and Aristotle's Poetics (New Delhi: Longman, 2006).

He is the editor of Renaissance Texts and Contexts (New Delhi: Macmillan, 2003)

and Music and Modernity: North Indian Classical Music in an Age of Mechanical Reproduction (Kolkata: Thema, 2007).

=== Articles ===
Musical Contests: Reflections on Musical Values in Popular Film

In Heidegger's Hut

Augustine on Memory: A Note on Confessions 10.8-37

North Indian Classical Music in the 'Long' 1940s

Tragedy and the irrelevant: A Note on Hamlet

Tragedy and the Good Life

The Miltonic Dissimile: Language and Style in Paradise Lost, Book 4
