= Shruti Sadolikar =

Shruti Sadolikar Katkar
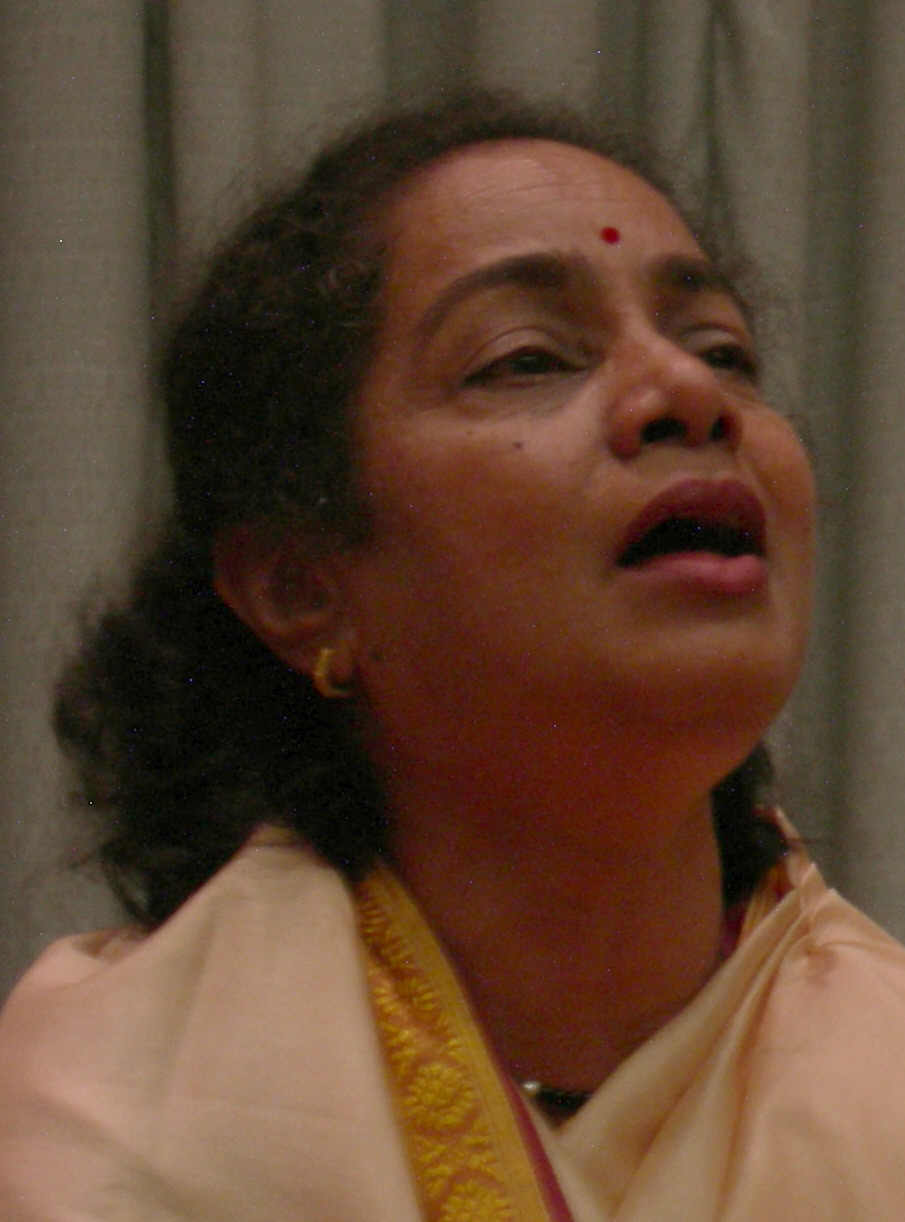

Background information
- Born: Shruti Sadolikar; 9 November 1951 (age 75)
- Origin: Maharashtra, India
- Genre: Hindustani classical music
- Instrument: Singing

Shruti Sadolikar Katkar (born 9 November 1951) is an Indian classical singer of the khyal style in the Jaipur-Atrauli gharana. She is a recipient of the Sangeet Natak Akademi Award for Hindustani vocal music for 2011.

== Biography ==
=== Early life and training ===
Sadolikar was born 1951 into a family from Kolhapur which was known for its musical tradition. She received training in Indian classical music from childhood. Her initial training was given by her father, Wamanrao Sadolikar, who was taught by the founder of the Jaipur-Atrauli gharana, Alladiya Khan, and his son Bhurji Khan. Following her studies with her father, Sadolikar learnt music for twelve years from Gulubhai Jasdanwala, who was known for his large collection of raga compositions, including compositions in rare ragas. Sadolikar earned a master's degree from SNDT Women's University in Mumbai and wrote a thesis on Haveli Sangeet, a type of temple music.

=== Career ===
Sadolikar performs all forms of Indian classical and semi-classical music, including thumri, tappa, and natya sangeet, and has performed in India, Canada, the United States, France, Switzerland, Germany, and the West Asian countries. She had several musical and educational recordings published and holds the Homi Bhabha Fellowship of the National Centre for the Performing Arts. In 1999, Sadolikar produced a play named "Sangeet Tulsidas" for which she set the music, and she performed for SPIC MACAY to interest young Indians in Indian classical music. Sadolikar has regularly performed playback for Indian movies. She had Katkar added to her name after marriage and is a student of Azizuddin Khan, son of Burji Khan.

Sadolikar worked as Vice Chancellor of the Bhatkhande Music Institute University in Lucknow, Uttar Pradesh from 2009 till 2020.
