= Vasubahen =

Gujarati writer from India (1924–2020)

- Born: Vasubahen Ramprasad Bhatt; 23 March 1924; Baroda, Baroda State, British Raj (present-day Vadodara, India)
- Died: 13 December 2020 (aged 96); Ahmedabad, Gujarat, India
- Citizenship: Indian
- Occupations: Novelist; Story writer
- Writing career
- Language: Gujarati
- Notable work: Pandade Pandade Moti

Vasubahen (23 March 1924 ― 13 December 2020), born Vasubahen Ramprasad Bhatt, was Gujarati language story writer and novelist from Gujarat, India. She was a director of various All India Radio stations in Gujarat as well as a Chairman of the Gujarat State Social Welfare Board.

== Biography ==
Vasubahen was born on 23 March 1924 at Baroda (now Vadodara) to Ramprasad Balkrishna Shastri and Sarasvatiben. Her father was a political secretary of Sayajirao Gaekwad III of Baroda State. She was the fifth among seven siblings. Her family was a native of Ahmedabad and her maternal family belonged to Amod village near Bharuch. She completed her school education from Baroda. She completed Grihita Gama (equivalent to Bachelor of Arts) in Gujarati, Psychology and Sociology from S. N. D. T. College (now SNDT Women's University). She then studied for a Bachelor of Education.

She joined All India Radio (now Akashvani) in 1949, later served as the Director at Ahmedabad, Rajkot and Vadodara and retired in 1982. She was a Chairperson of the Juvenile Welfare Board, Ahmedabad and a Chairman of the Gujarat State Social Welfare Board. She had also served as the President of Gujarat Stree Kelvani Mandal and the Children Academy. She also presided over the Anandam. She was an actress as well.

She died in Ahmedabad on 13 December 2020 following prolonged illness.

== Works ==
She was a story writer. She started writing during her student life. Pariksha Ke Karkasha? was her first story. Pandade Pandade Moti was her first story collection. It was followed by other story collections such as Sarsij (1996), Divase Tara Rate Vadal (1968), Manaraj (1973), Ghadik Ashadh Ghadik Fagan (1980) and Be Ankhni Sharam (1996). Zakalpichhodi (1959) is a novella on the life of a female. Her stories are translated in Hindi, English, Kannada and Malayalam.

== Awards ==
She had received the Delhi Award for artistic programmes on Akashvani in 1978. Her short story collection Pandade Pandade Moti (1963) and biography Yoganuyog (2002) were awarded by the Gujarati Sahitya Parishad.

== See also ==
- List of Gujarati-language writers
