= Dhondutai Kulkarni =

Indian classical singer (1927–2014)

- Born: Dhondu Kulkarni; 23 July 1927; Kolhapur, India
- Died: 1 June 2014 (aged 86) Mumbai, India
- Genre: Khyal
- Occupation: Indian classical music
- Instrument: singing
- Years active: 1935 - 2014

Dhondutai Kulkarni (23 July 1927 – 1 June 2014) was an Indian classical singer from the Jaipur-Atrauli gharana. She was the last legendary exponent of orthodox Jaipur-Atrauli Gharana.

== Early life ==
Dhondutai was born in a Brahmin family in Kolhapur, Maharashtra. Her father initiated her into music. Subsequently, she came under the tutelage of Bhurji Khan of the Jaipur-Atrauli gharana. Gaining recognition as a child artiste she became an All India Radio performing artiste at the age of eight. Her training continued under the mentorship of Gaan-Chandrika Laxmibai Jadhav and Ustad Azizuddin Khan, disciple and grandson of Ustad Alladiya Khan, the founder of the gharana. She received most of her repertoire of rare Ragas from Ustad Azizuddin Khan. Thereafter, she spent a long number of years under the tutelage of Kesarbai Kerkar, ending up as her sole disciple.

== Awards and recognition ==
Dhondutai has been awarded the Sangeet Natak Akademi Award in 1990. She was regularly featured at the "Surashri Kesarbai Kerkar Sangeet Sammelan" since its beginnings, she sang last at these concerts.

Journalist Namita Devidayal's book The Music Room chronicles a significant part of Dhondutai's life, music and career. Namita has been one of her students and learned from her over a period of 25 years. The book talks about the life and music of Alladiya Khan, Kesarbai Kerkar and Dhondutai.
