= Manji Khan =

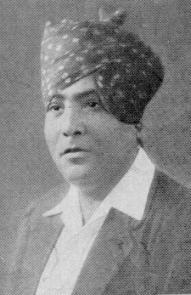

Background information
- Born: Badruddin Ghulam Ahmad Khan; 1888; Uniara, North-Western Provinces, British India
- Origin: Uniara, Rajasthan, India
- Died: 27 July 1937 (aged 48–49) Mumbai, Bombay Presidency, British India
- Genres: Khayal, Bhajans, Thumris
- Occupation: Hindustani classical vocalist of the Jaipur-Atrauli Gharana
- Instrument: Vocals Hindustani classical music
- Years active: 1897–1937

Ustad Badruddin "Manji" Khan (1888–27 July 1937) was a Hindustani Classical vocalist of the Jaipur-Atrauli Gharana founded by his father, Ustad Alladiya Khan. "He was called 'Manji' because he was his father's Manjhala (middle) son."

== Early life ==
Manji Khan was born in c. 1888. He was the second son of Ustad Alladiya Khan. "Because of the health ailments of his other two brothers, elder Ustad Nasiruddin 'Badeji' Khan and younger Ustad Shamsuddin "Bhurji" Khan, Ustad Manji Khan was treated and chosen by Ustad Alladiya Khan as the foremost inheritor and disciple of the Jaipur-Atrauli gharana."

== Musical style and training ==
Ustad Manji Khan was influenced by Ustad Rahimat Khan, a popular vocalist at the time, of the Gwalior Gharana. The influence of Ustad Rahimat Khan's style in Ustad Bhurji Khan's singing earned him the wrath of his father, and thus gave up singing for a while. He resumed it later, under his father's conditions, but his career was cut short by his early death.

"Ustad Manji Khan was noted for his serene face while singing, and earned popularity amongst younger listeners because of his choice to punctuate the more serious classical fare with exquisitely sung lighter pieces."

Manji Khan was something of a rebel, determined to widen the horizons of his gharana without compromising in the least on the fundamentals as exemplified by his great father. He lent it a refreshing quality of romanticism - as Abdul Karim Khan did to his Kirana gharana and Faiyaz Khan did to his Agra gharana. And thereby, he evolved a style which was marked not only by the discipline and purity of Alladiya Khan's music but also the subtlety and fecundity of his own imagination.

— Mohan Nadkarni

=== Students ===
Mallikarjun Mansur became Ustad Manji Khan's disciple just before Khan's death. Later, Mansur learned under Ustad Alladiya Khan's youngest son Ustad Bhurji Khan. Gulubhai Jasdanwalla also learned from Ustad Manji Khan for several years.

"It was through the initiative of a friend that Ustad Manji Khan, son of Ustad Alladiya Khan of the Jaipur gharana noticed Mallikarjun. Already trained in the Gwalior gharana style, Mallikarjun was able to absorb the rich Jaipur style." Pandit Mansur is Ustad Manji Khan's sole musical inheritor.

== Death ==
Ustad Manji Khan died on 27 July 1937 in an accident in Bombay.

=== Legacy ===
Like his famous father, Ustad Manji Khan did not leave behind any recordings.
