= Kesarbai Kerkar =

Indian classical vocalist (1892–1977)

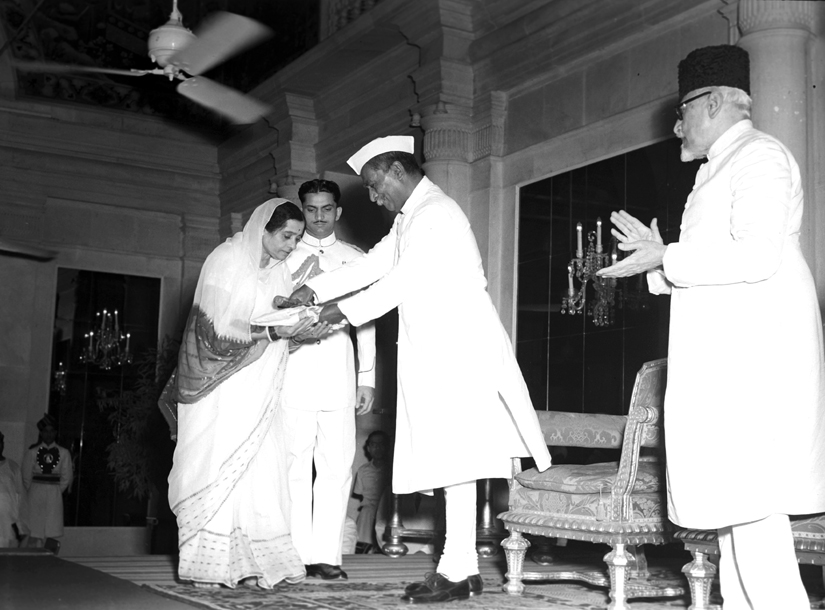
- Kesarbai Kerkar receiving Sangeet Natak Akademi Award in March 1953

Background information
- Born: Kesarbai Kerkar; 13 July 1892
- Origin: Keri, Goa
- Died: 16 September 1977 (aged 85) ??
- Genre: Hindustani classical music – Khayal
- Occupation: Hindustani classical vocalist
- Years active: 1930-1964

Kesarbai Kerkar (13 July 1892 – 16 September 1976 (?) ) was an Indian classical vocalist of the Jaipur-Atrauli gharana. A protege of Ustad Alladiya Khan (1855–1946), the founder of the gharana, she went on to become one of the most noted khayal singers of the second half of the 20th century.

She was 67 when she was awarded the Sangeet Natak Akademi Award in 1953, followed by Padma Bhushan, the third highest civilian award in India, in 1969. One of her recordings is included on the Voyager Golden Record.

== Biography ==
=== Early life and training ===
Born in the tiny village of Keri (also spelled "Querim"), in a family from Ponda taluka of North Goa, Goa (then a Portuguese colony), at the age of eight Kerkar moved to Kolhapur, where she studied for eight months with Abdul Karim Khan. Upon her return to Goa, she studied with the vocalist Ramkrishnabuwa Vaze (1871–1945), during his visits to Lamgaon. Kesarbai Kerkar came from a devadasi background in Goa. She studied temple bhajan and kirtan from a young age.

At the time, Mumbai (then Bombay) under British Raj, was fast developing as a business and trade centre of the country. Several musicians and singers from North India and Central India, facing declining patronage from princely states started migrating to the city. At the age of 16, she too moved to Mumbai with her mother and uncle. A wealthy local businessman Seth Vitthaldas Dwarkadas helped her study under Barkat Ullah Khan, the sitar player and court musician at Patiala State. He taught her intermittently for two years, during his visit to the city. However, when Khan, became court musician at Mysore State, she trained under Bhaskarbuwa Bakhale (1869-1922) and Ramkrishnabuwa Vaze for short periods.

Eventually ending up as disciple to Ustad Alladiya Khan (1855–1946), the founder of the Jaipur-Atrauli gharana, beginning in 1921, and trained rigorously under him for following eleven years. Though she started singing professionally in 1930, she continued learning from Khan, despite his failing health, till his death in 1946.

=== Career ===
Kerkar eventually achieved wide renown, performing regularly for aristocratic audiences. She was very particular about the representation of her work and consequently made only a few 78 rpm recordings, for the His Master's Voice and Broadcast labels. In time, Kerkar became an accomplished Khayal singer of her generation, and seldom sang light classical music, often associated with female vocalists. Her success as a public singer, along with that of Mogubai Kurdikar (mother of Kishori Amonkar), Hirabai Barodekar and Gangubai Hangal, paved the way for the next generation of female vocalists, away from singing mehfils or private gatherings that women of previous generations had to settle for.

Kerkar was awarded the 1953 Sangeet Natak Akademi Award, given by the Sangeet Natak Akademi, India's National Academy of Music, Dance & Drama, as the highest Indian recognition given to practicing artists This was followed by the decoration of Padma Bhushan by the government of India in 1969, and in the same year the government of the Indian state of Maharashtra conferred upon her the title of "Rajya Gayika." Indian Nobel laureate Rabindranath Tagore (1861–1941) is said to have been very fond of Kerkar's singing. Her honorific title "Surashri" (or "Surshri") literally means "one with a mastery over notes" (sur meaning "notes" in Indian classical music and shri which is an honorific title used in this context as lord or master), and was bestowed on her in 1948 by the Sangeet Pravin Sangitanuragi Sajjan Saman Samiti of Calcutta. She retired from public singing in 1963–64.

In her ancestral village of Keri, the Surashree Kesarbai Kerkar High School now occupies the site of Kerkar's former second home, and the house where she was born still stands, less than one kilometer away. A music festival called the Surashree Kesarbai Kerkar Smriti Sangeet Samaroha is held in Goa each November, by Kala Academy, Goa. and a music scholarship in her name is awarded annually to a University of Mumbai student by National Centre for the Performing Arts (NCPA) via Kesarbai Kerkar Scholarship Fund. Unlike her Guru, Kerkar was not fond of teaching, and thus taught only one disciple, Dhondutai Kulkarni, who has previously learned from Ut. Bhurji Khan, the son of Alladiya Khan and Ut. Azizuddin Khan, grandson of Alladiya Khan.

Kerkar has the further distinction of having one of her recordings, "Jaat Kahan Ho", duration 3:30 (an interpretation of raga Bhairavi) included on the Voyager Golden Record, a gold-plated copper disc containing music selections from around the world, which was sent into space aboard the Voyager 1 and 2 spacecraft in 1977. The recording was recommended for inclusion on the Voyager disc by the ethnomusicologist Robert E. Brown, who believed it to be the finest recorded example of Indian classical music.

Since 2000, several CDs of her archival recordings have been released, including one on the Golden Milestones series, which contains several of her most famous songs.

== Recordings ==
- Classical Vocal CD (2008) from Sangeet Natak Akademi
- Golden Milestones (2003)
- Vintage 78 Rpm Recording on CD
- Living Music of the Past CD from Underscore Records site
- Baithak Series – Live concert Recordings A set of 4 CDs Published by Sangeet Kendra
