= Bharati Vaishampayan =

Hindustani classical vocalist (1954–2020)

- Born: 1 January 1954
- Died: 19 January 2020 (aged 66)
- Genres: Thumri, Dadra, Kajri, Jhoola, Tappa, Khayal, Bhajans, Tarana, Bandish
- Occupation: Hindustani Classical Music-Vocal
- Years active: 1972 – 2020

Bharati Vaishampayan (1 January 1954 - 19 January 2020) was a Hindustani classical vocalist of the Jaipur-Atrauli gharana and the former Dean and Head of Department of Music at Shivaji University.

== Early life and education ==
Born into a family with a keen interest in music, Vaishampayan began her training in Hindustani Classical Music at the age of 12 under the tuition of Shri Chintubua Mhaiskar of Sangli. She first performed on All India Radio (AIR) in 1972.

She was awarded the National Scholarship for Higher Education in Music by the Indian government in 1976. As a result of this she was able to further her studies under Pandit Sudhakarbua Digrajkar of the Jaipur-Atrauli gharana, who trained her in the performance of raaga.

She completed her M.A. (Music) from SNDT Women's University, Mumbai, in 1982, and earned the Sangeet Pravin (Doctorate in Music) by Gandharva Mahavidyalaya in 1985.

== Musical career ==
Through this training, she was given the opportunity to perform on AIR's Tuesday Night Concert. Her performance was heard by Pandit Nivruttibua Sarnaik, the maestro of the Jaipur-Atrauli gharana, who wrote to her to invite her to become his student. During this period Vaishampayan also met Shri Baburao Joshi of Kolhapur, who trained her in light-classical forms of music such as Thumri, Dadra, Kajri, Jhoola and Tappa.

As a vocalist of the Jaipur-Atrauli gharana, she performed in numerous concerts and festivals in various cities, and was broadcast regularly on AIR from 1972. She worked as an expert on the station's Selection Committee in 1990, and participated in various discussions shows, including Future of Classical Music and Swarlipi of Pandit Bhatkhande. She was rated as a "TOP" grade artist in Classical and "A" Grade in Light-Classical categories. She also participated in a number of special programmes and lecture-demonstrations on rare and less-performed Raagas of Hindustani music.

Two CDs of various live performances by Vaishampayan have been released by the Musician's Guild, featuring Raagas including Shuddha Kalyan, Yaman, Shankara, Khambavati, Kaushi Kanada, Adana Bahaar and Malvi.

== As an educator ==
She was involved in the Music department of Shivaji University, Kolhapur, from its inception in 1984. She became the Head of the Music department in 1987, and later the Dean of the university. She was an examiner and member of the Board of Studies of several universities, including Dharwad University, Goa University, Marathwada University, Nagpur University, Pune University, the Maharaja Sayajirao University of Baroda, Kurukshetra University and Amravati University, and visited many other universities as an expert for specialised lecture-demonstrations and refresher courses.

== Awards ==
Vaishampayan received several awards and recognitions, including:

- Government of India National Scholarship for higher training for the year 1976–77.
- "Gaan Hira" awarded by SNDT Women's University, Mumbai, for her performance in the M.A. (Music) Exam in 1982.
- Best Teacher Award by Shivaji University in the year 1998.
- Mangal Puraskaar in 2001.
- Sangeetkar Ram Kadam Puraskaar awarded by Ram Kadam Pratishthan, Pune, in 2002.
- Kolhapur Bhushan Puraskaar in 2002.
- Bharat Jyoti Puraskaar awarded by India International Friendship Society, New Delhi, in 2003.
- "Swara Chandra Shikhar" national award by Chandrashekhar Swamiji Memorial Trust, Hubbali.
- Pandit Dr.Janorikar "Sangeet Bhushan" Puraskar awarded by Ganwardhan, Pune in 2018
