= Kamala Shankar =

Indian classical musician (born 1966)

- Born: 5 December 1966 (age 59); Thanjavur, Tamil Nadu, India
- Origin: Varanasi, Uttar Pradesh, India
- Genre: Indian classical music
- Occupation: Musician
- Instrument: Shankar guitar
- Years active: 1984–present
- Website: drkamalashankar.com

Kamala Shankar (born 5 December 1966) is an Indian classical musician specializing in the Gharana tradition. She has created her own instrument, a custom version of a Hawaiian slide guitar that she calls the Shankar slide guitar. Shankar founded the Shakara Arts Foundation in 2007, and she holds a doctorate degree from Banaras Hindu University. She received the Kumar Gandharva Samman award from the government of Madhya Pradesh in 2013.

== Discography ==
- Jhankaar (2008)
- Hues of the Indian Guitar (2019)
