= Mogubai Kurdikar =

Indian classical vocalist (1904–2001)

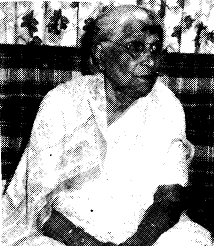
- Born: Mogara Kurdikar; 15 July 1904; Kurdi, Goa, Portuguese India
- Died: 10 February 2001 (aged 96); Mumbai, Maharashtra, India
- Occupation: Hindustani Classical Vocalist
- Years active: 1913–2001
- Spouse: Madhavdas Bhatia (m. 1923; died 1939)
- Children: 3, including Kishori Amonkar
- Awards: Sangeet Natak Akademi Award (1968); Padma Bhushan (1974)
- Musical career
- Genres: Khayal; Dhrupad; Dhamar; Tarana; Bhajan; Abhang; Natya Sangeet; Thumri
- Instruments: Vocals; Tanpura; Tabla; Harmonium

Mogubai Kurdikar (15 July 1904 – 10 February 2001) was an Indian classical vocalist of the Jaipur-Atrauli Gharana. She was known for being a leading student of Alladiya Khan and the guru and mother of Kishori Amonkar, a popular Hindustani classical female vocalist from the 20th century.

== Life and career ==
=== Early life ===
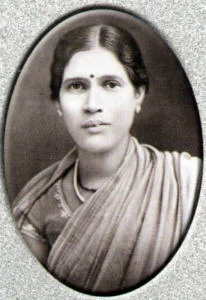
Mogubai Kurdikar in her 30s

Kurdikar was born in Kurdi village, Portuguese Goa to a Gomantak Maratha Samaj family. Little is known of her father; her mother, Jayashreebai, was from the Devadasi community and known locally as a talented singer.

In 1913, Kurdikar began learning music for a while from a holy man at the Shri Damodar Sansthaan in Zambaulim, Goa, arranged by her mother. Later, Kurdikar's mother took her to a traveling theater company, the Chandreshwar Bhootnath Sangeet Mandali, which accepted her as an actress.

=== Work in sangeet nataks ===
While working for the Chandreshwar Bhootnath Mandali sangeet natak company, Kurdikar's mother died in 1914. Kurdikar's mother entrusted her to the care of Balkrishna Parvatkar who was also from Kurdi and worked for the theater company. One account suggests that Kurdikar's mother told her on her deathbed that her soul would not reincarnate until Kurdikar became a famous singer.

The theater company soon went bankrupt and the rival Satarkar Stree Sangeet Mandali hired Kurdikar. While there, she performed in roles like Kinkini from Punyaprabhav and Subhadra from Subhadra. At this theater company, she was given music lessons by Chintobuwa Gurav, a student of Bhaskarbuwa Bakhale. She also learned Kathak from Ramlal during this time. She was also trained in Ghazal by Dattaramji Nanodkar.

=== Move to Sangli ===
Kurdikar was expelled from the theater company after a conflict arose between her and one of the senior women of company. This reportedly took a toll on her spirits and health. In 1919, Kurdikar was taken to Sangli by her aunt for related medical treatment. Visiting Sangli reportedly proved transformative for Kurdikar. At Sangli, she began learning music from Inayat Khan R. Pathan, a local recording artist.

=== Meeting Alladiya Khan ===
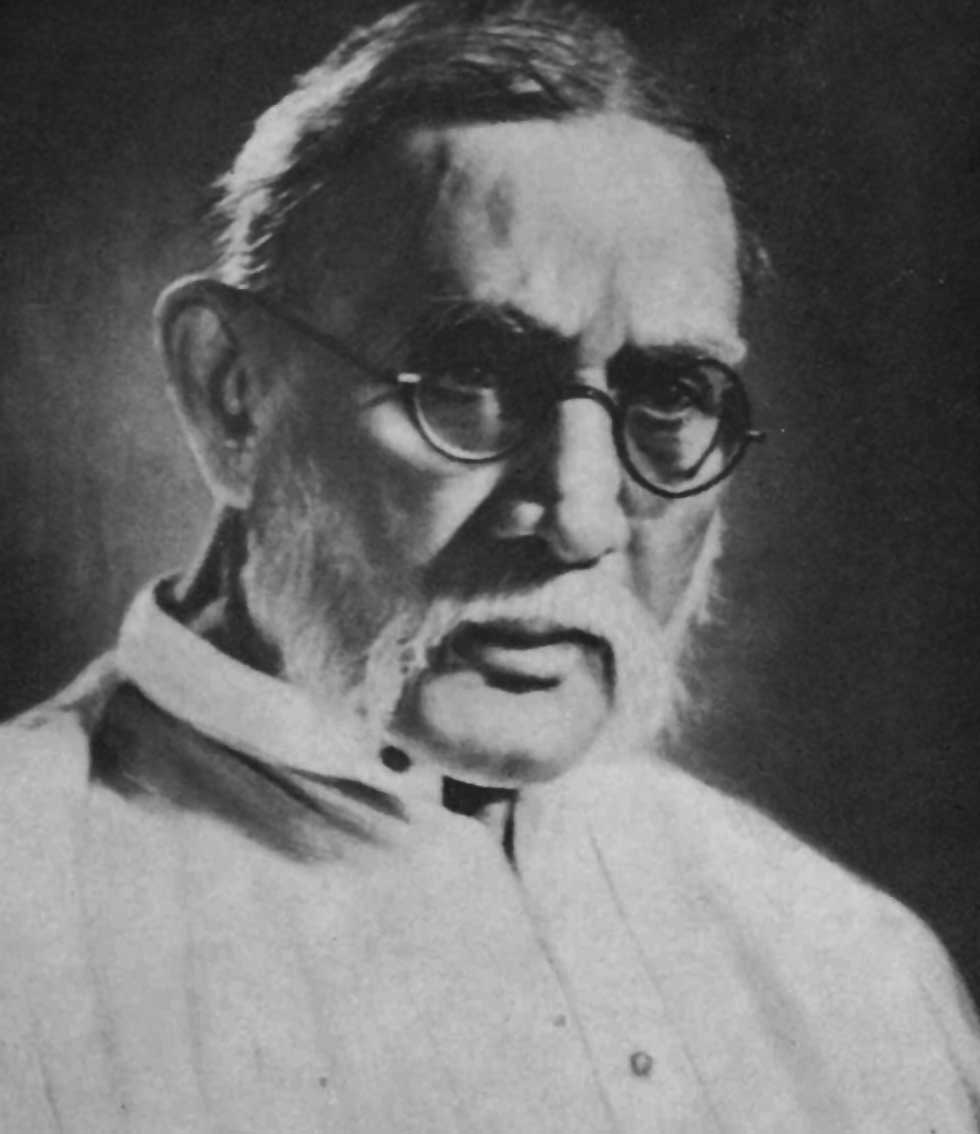
Alladiya Khan, the primary guru of Mogubai Kurdikar.

Jaipur-Atrauli maestro Alladiya Khan was at Sangli for medical treatment at the same time as Kurdikar. He would hear Kurdikar's practice while walking by her residence on his way to and from his doctor, Abasaheb Sambre. Eager to identify the singer, Khan one day climbed the stairs to visit Kurdikar's residence. Startled by the stranger's presence, Kurdikar stopped singing. Khan asked her to continue and, upon her resuming and concluding, expressed appreciation. He offered to teach her and started the first lesson immediately, to which Kurdikar agreed. Despite Alladiya's fame, Kurdikar had not heard of him. Only after witnessing other dignitaries bowing to Khan did she realize his esteem.

=== Politics in Bombay ===
After eighteen months of teaching, Alladiya Khan moved to Bombay. Kurdikar followed in 1922. She stayed at a small rented premise at Khetwadi near Grant Road.

Kurdikar was exposed to Bombay's intrigue of high-society and classical music circles. Though Alladiya Khan was still court musician of Kolhapur, he used to stay at Bombay for longer periods where he trained students. Kurdikar's training with Khan included many obstacles. Khan's more politically powerful students including Kesarbai Kerkar put forth a condition that he should not train other disciples except them. Khan had to oblige due to his dependence on and support from wealthy patrons who sponsored his teaching and would not let him take other students. Reports also suggest smearing campaigns were run against her on the instigation of Kesarbai by Wamanrao Sadolikar and Shruti Sadolikar. Consequently, Kurdikar was forced to leave Khan's tutelage in the early 1920s. At some point, Kurdikar also learned from tabla maestro Khaprumama Parvatkar.

=== Shifting gurus ===
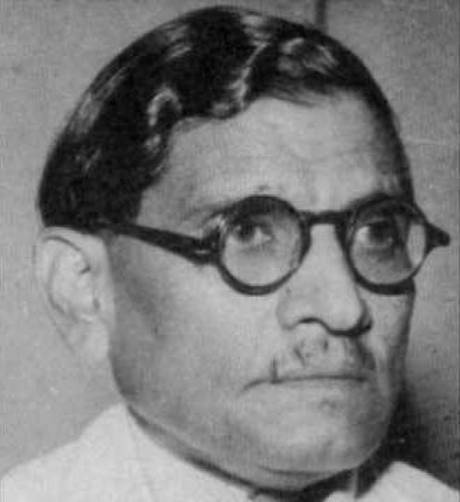
Portrait of Vilayat Hussain Khan "Pran Piya," from whom Kurdikar learned.

Advised by her peers, Kurdikar began learning from Bashir Hussain Khan in 1924, the older brother of Vilayat Hussain Khan and eldest son of Natthan Khan. He agreed to teach her if she became a formal disciple and performed the ganda bandhan ceremony of guru shishya parampara. This ceremony was held in 1926 at the Kalidas Building of Borabhat Lane. In 1926, she also started learning from Vilayat Hussain Khan. However, he left Bombay due to health problems after teaching Kurdikar for three months.

=== Return to Alladiya Khan ===
Upon hearing of Kurdikar's struggles, Alladiya Khan urged her to learn instead from his younger brother, Haider Khan. She hesitated due to the political clout of the ustads of Agra Gharana, of which Bashir Khan and Vilayat Hussain Khan were the leaders. Reportedly, Kurdikar had much stress in her personal life at this time too. She solicited a promise from Alladiya Khan to teacher her in the future if Haider Khan ever failed to.

In 1926, Alladiya Khan summoned his brother from Kolhapur to commence his teaching with Kurdikar in the Jaipur-Atrauli gayaki. Khan's more wealth and powerful students were pressing him to end Kurdikar's teaching due to her rapid progress. Khan felt pressured to send Haider Khan to leave Bombay and end Kurdikar's tutelage after eight months. He was reportedly heartbroken about breaking his promise to her.

While Kurdikar could have supported herself as a performer during this time, her desire to be a leading exponent convinced her not to. Instead, she continued her riyaz and sādhanā with determination until Alladiya Khan eventually returned to teach her. She performed the ganda bandhan ceremony with Khan in 1934. Her training with Khan continued until his death in 1946.

=== Growing popularity ===
From 1940 onwards, Kurdikar started touring across the British Indian provinces for performances. This included performances broadcast on All India Radio. She became reputed for her restrained, purist, austere, and subtle approach to music. She quickly became known as a leading exponent of the Jaipur-Atrauli Gharana, alongside Kesarbai Kerkar, Laxmibai Jadhav, and Azmat Hussain Khan. Kurdikar avoided publicly performing thumri and natya sangeet to maintain her status as a purist.

=== Challenges with misogyny ===
Kurdikar endured an era when female artists were not treated with respect or equity. Her daughter, Kishori Amonkar, would recount how Kurdikar had to travel to the venue of her performance in third class railway compartments, despite being a doyenne. Kurdikar was paid less and subjected to shoddy treatment by many organizers. Often, she was not provided a guest house and was forced to stay at peoples' homes.

== Personal life ==
=== Family ===
Kurdikar married Madhavdas Bhatia in 1923. In 1939, Bhatia died, leaving Mogu with her three school-age children. They had three children together: Kishori (1932-2017), Lalita (b. 1935), and Ulhas (1937-2015).

== Legacy ==
=== Compositions ===
Kurdikar was known to have composed khayals that she and her disciples made popular. These include:

- Raga Gauri khayal in teentala, "Āo jī Nandalala."
- Raga Savani Kalyan khayal in teentala, "Jagata jananī mā ye."
- Raga Shuddha Nat khayal in ektala, "Aba kaise kara āun."
- Raga Shuddha Nat khayal in teentala, "Kaise kahun morī bāta."
- Raga Bhoop Nat khayal in teentala, "Sajanavā ā more ghara."
- Raga Savani Nat khayal in teentala, "Aba Shyāma nā āe."
- Rayasa Kanada khayal in teentala, "Yerī nīnda nā āe."
- Raga Sampurna Malkauns khayal in teentala, "Banavārī Shyāma more."
- Raga Malkauns khayal in teentala, "Balamā morā āo jī mahārāja."
- Raga Basant Bahar khayal in teentala, "Māna rī māna rī."
- Raga Basanti Kedar khayal in ektala, "Khelana āe rī navelī nāra" (contributed the antara to Haider Khan's asthai).

=== Students ===
Kurdikar taught many disciples and was notable for commencing an extensive lineage of women musicians. Her prominent disciples include:

- Kishori Amonkar (daughter)
- Vamanrao Deshpande
- Sushila Rani Patel
- Kaushalya Manjeshwar
- Babanrao Haldankar
- Kamal Tambe
- Manik Bhide
- Suhasini Mulgaonkar
- Vijaya Joglekar
- Padma Talwalkar
- Arun Dravid
- Sulabha Pishvikar
- Meena Joshi
- Meera Panshikar
- Tejaswini Amonkar (great-grand daughter)

== Discography ==
=== 78 RPM Recordings ===
- Columbia GE 3997 (1947): Bihag Bahar, "Phir aain laut baharen" (lyric by Madhukar Rajasthani, music by Snehal Bhatkar); Khambavati, "Vande Mataram" (music by V. D. Ambhaikar).
- Columbia GE 8114 (1948): Jaijaiwanti, "Ali piya"; Nayaki Kanada, "Mero piya rasiya."
- Columbia GE 8115 (1948): Purvi, "Avana kahe"; Savani, "Deva deva santa sanga."
- Columbia GE 8207 (1948): Multani, "Hare mana ka"; Kedar, "Payo more rama nama dhana."
- Columbia GE 8427 (1948): Hindoli, "Chanak mund bhai"; Bilawal, "Kahe lajai re piya."
- Columbia GE 8473 (1950): Yaman, "Tarana"; Bageshri, "Tarana."
- Columbia GE 8566 (1950): Shukla Bilawal, "Awo aaj baje bajayen" (bandish attributed to Alladiya Khan); Suha, "Pana viri main kain."

== Awards and honours ==
Mogubai Kurdikar was honoured with several awards, prominent among which include:

- Awarded the title "Gaan Tapasvini (गान तपस्वीनी)," "The Singing Ascetic"
- Tansen Puraskar
- Sangeet Natak Akademi Award (1968)
- Padma Bhushan (1974)

The "Gaan Tapasvini" Mogubai Kurdikar Award is given in Mogubai Kurdikar's memory.

An annual festival in Margao, Goa, the "Gaan Tapasvini Mogubai Kurdikar Smruti Sangeet Sammelan," is hosted by the town's "Swarmanch" organization to commemorate Kurdikar's memory.
