= Bhurji Khan =

- Born: Shamsuddin Ghulam Ahmad Khan; 1890; Bundi, North-Western Provinces, British India
- Origin: Bundi, India
- Died: 1950 (aged 59–60) Mumbai, Bombay Presidency, British India
- Genres: Khayal, Bhajans, Thumris
- Occupation: Hindustani classical vocalist of the Jaipur-Atrauli Gharana
- Instrument: Vocalist of Classical music
- Years active: 1900–1950

Ustad Shamsuddin "Bhurji" Khan (1890–1950) was a Hindustani classical vocalist of the Jaipur-Atrauli Gharana founded by his father, Ustad Alladiya Khan.

== Early life ==
Ustad Bhurji Khan was the third and the youngest son of Ustad Alladiya Khan. Despite this, Ustad Alladiya Khan felt that Ustad Bhurji Khan was the most capable of his children.

Bhurji's voice was excellent and had a good range. Among the three brothers his voice was the best. He was also intelligent. He used to listen to his brother's training and sing all the compositions.

— Ustad Alladiya Khan

=== Health ===
In his late youth, Ustad Bhurji Khan fell seriously ill with influenza while visiting Uniara, Rajasthan.

He used to suffer from nose-bleeds. Four or five bowls of blood would flow out from his nose in a day. His brain became weak. He could not get good treatment in the village. They would apply pandu mud and pour jars of water over his head constantly. Because of this he had a severe cold and he lost that quality of his voice for ever.

— Ustad Alladiya Khan

== Musical style and training ==
Ustad Bhurji Khan's illness affected his musical growth. Brain-damage from the illness contributed to his forgetfulness and memory loss. As a result, his father abandoned training him, where he continued his musical training with his uncle, Ustad Haider Khan. Despite Ustad Haider Khan's persistence, it was only until Ustad Bhurji Khan took to teaching that his memory solidified and his musical growth resumed. After this, his training with his father also resumed.

Since his illness Bhurji suffered from weakness in the brain. He could not grasp anything. He would forget the compositions taught to him. One day I got very angry and I snatched away the Tanpura from his hands ... Singing in the temple and teaching that girl made a great difference to Bhurji Khan's singing. One day I heard him in the temple. He was singing quite well. I was pleased. I thanked Allah. My disappointment disappeared. I put the tanpura back in his hands. His training resumed.

— Ustad Alladiya Khan

=== Students ===
Ustad Bhurji Khan was instrumental in expanding the presence of the Jaipur-Atrauli gayaki in Hindustani Classical music. Among his many disciples are Gaanyogini Dhondutai Kulkarni, Madhusudhan Kanetkar, Gajananbua Joshi, Madhukar Sadolikar, Wamanrao Sadolikar, and his own son, Baba Azizuddin Khan.

Ustad Bhurji Khan's famous disciple was Pandit Mallikarjun Mansur. After the death of his elder brother, Ustad Manji Khan, Ustad Bhurji Khan agreed to teach Pandit Mallikarjun Mansur under his father's command.

== Death ==
Ustad Bhurji Khan died in 1950 after a prolonged illness.
