= D. K. Datar =

Indian violinist (1932–2018)

Pandit Damodar Keshav Datar (14 October 1932 – 10 October 2018), popular as D. K. Datar, was an Indian violinist. He was born in Kurundwad, Kolhapur district, Maharashtra. His brother Narayanrao introduced him to music and he took early lessons in violin from Pandit Vighneshwar Shastri, who used to teach at the Deodhar School of Indian Music, Mumbai. Datar completed his Bachelor's Degree but took music as full time profession. He was nephew of Hindustani classical vocalist D. V. Paluskar, under whom he later on studied music. Influenced by Paluskar, Datar adjusted his violin playing technique to vocal dominated style and played violin according to the khyal style of Gwalior gharana. Apart from khyal, he popularly also played on bhajan, thumri and natya sangeet styles. Among various countries, he toured Europe, the United States, Canada, and Japan. He was also employed by Films Division of India and regularly provided background score for various documentary films. He received Sangeet Natak Akademi Award in Hindustani Music in 1995 and in 2004 was conferred with Padma Shri, India's 4th highest civilian honour. he died on 10 October 2018 of old age at his residing home in Goregaon, Mumbai.

== Awards ==
- 1995 - Sangeet Natak Akademi Award in Hindustani Music
- 2004 - Padma Shri
