= Arun Dravid =

Arun Dravid (born 1943) is an Indian industrialist and classical singer of the Jaipur gharana. A gold medalist from IIT Bombay, he went on to complete a doctorate in chemical engineering from MIT. He then pursued a highly successful career in industry. As a musician, he was trained in childhood by Ustaad Abdul Majid Khan, and later on by Kishori Amonkar. He became a key disciple of Amonkar, and has continued to preserve and promote her music.

He played the role of the music guru Pandit Vinayak Pradhan in the 2020 film The Disciple.
