= Ashwini Bhide-Deshpande =

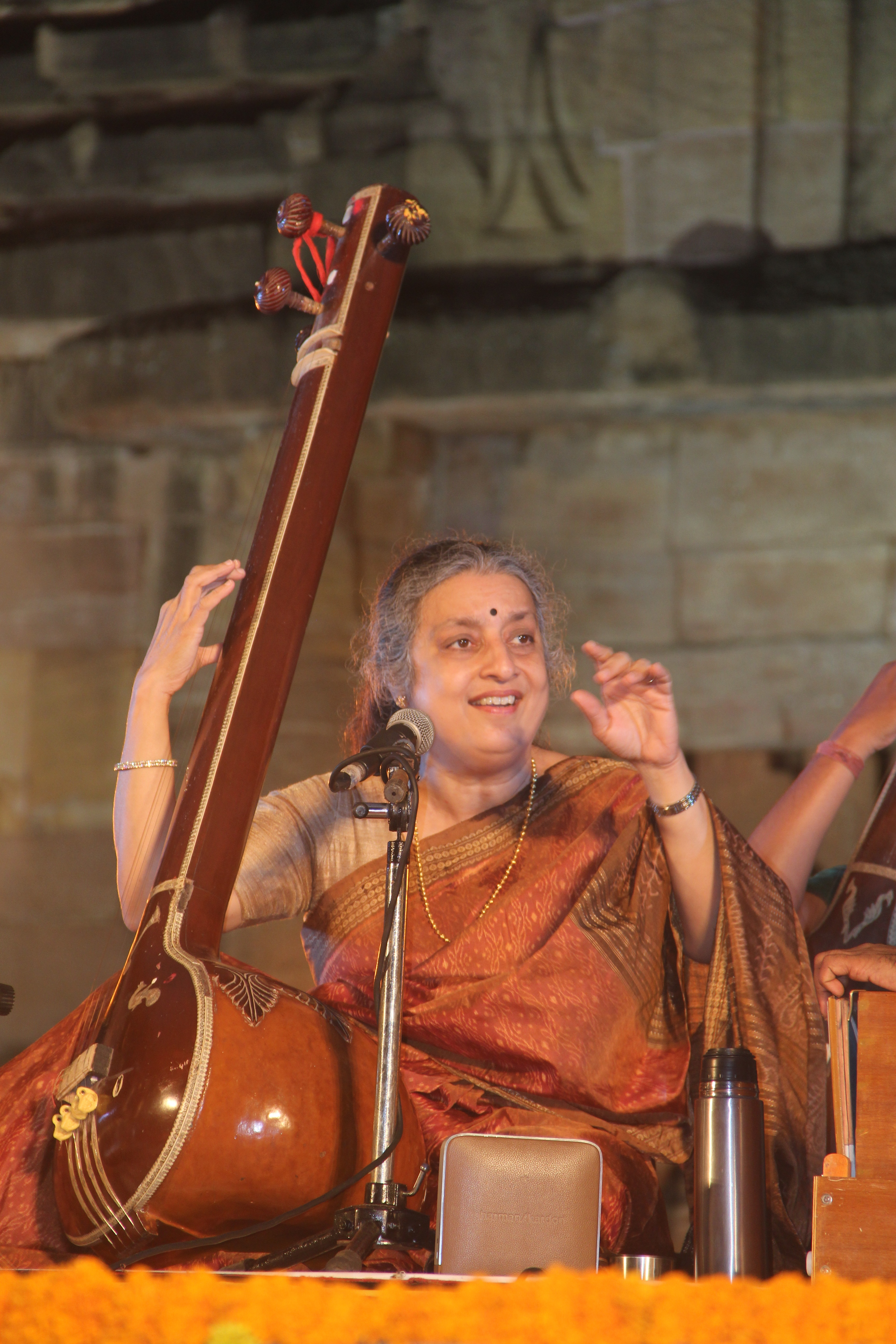
- Ashwini Bhide-Deshpande Performing at Rajarani Music Festival-2016, Bhubaneswar, Odisha

Background information
- Born: Ashwini Govind Bhide; 7 October 1960 (age 66)
- Origin: Mumbai, India
- Genres: Khayal, Bhajans, Thumris
- Occupation: Hindustani classical vocalist
- Instrument: Vocals
- Years active: 1980–present
- Website: http://www.ashwinibhide.in

Ashwini Bhide-Deshpande (born 7 October 1960) is a Hindustani classical music vocalist from Mumbai. She belongs to the Jaipur-Atrauli gharana tradition. She was awarded Padma Shri in 2025 for her contribution to the arts.

== Early life and education ==
Born in Mumbai into a family with strong musical tradition, Ashwini started classical training under Narayanrao Datar, the elder brother of violinist D. K. Datar. She then completed her Sangeet Visharad from the Gandharva Mahavidyalaya. Since then, she has been learning music in the Jaipur-Atrauli style from her mother Manik Bhide, a disciple of Gaansaraswati Kishori Amonkar. Ashwini also received guidance from Ratnakar Pai until his death in 2009.

Bhide-Deshpande holds a Master's degree in Microbiology and earned a doctorate in Biochemistry from Bhabha Atomic Research Centre, a Sangeet Visharad from the Akhil Bharatiya Gandharva Mahavidyalaya Mandal, Mumbai. She has also been the recipient of an honorary D.Lit. from ITM University (Gwalior).

== Performing career ==
Bhide-Deshpande has performed at venues including the Aga Khan Museum in Toronto, Canada in 2019 for the Raag-Mala Music Society of Toronto.

Bhide-Deshpande has an understanding of Bandish and bandish-composition and has created many of her own bandishes, which she has published in her book, Raag Rachananjali (2004). A sequel titled "Ragarachananjali 2", containing 98 more bandishes (compositions) was published in 2010. She is also known for her setting of bhajans, especially those of Kabir.

Ashwini Bhide is not only a music scholar but is also blessed with a beautiful voice. I have personally known Ashwini since her early teens and it makes me so happy to see her blossom into such a wonderful Khayal singer. She has earned the reputation of being one of the top young artists of India... Having learnt many old compositions, she has been able to retain the spirit of the tradition through the dialects she has used as well as pay attention to the subject matter!

— Ravi Shankar

== Discography ==
- Introducing Ashwini Bhide (His Master's Voice; 1985) - Raag Yaman, Raag Tilak Kamod, Bhajan
- Rhythm House Classics (Rhythm House; 1987) - Raag Puriya Dhanashri, Raag Bhoop, Bhajan
- Ashwini Bhide Sings (His Master's Voice; 1988) - Raag Kedar, Raag Khambavati, Raag Bhoop Nat
- Live for Femina (Rhythm House; 1989) - Raag Nand, Raag Bageshri
- Morning Ragas Vol. 1 (Rhythm House; 1990) - Raag Lalit, Raag Vibhas
- Morning Ragas Vol. 2 (Rhythm House; 1990) - Raag Todi, Raag Kabir Bhairav, Raag Sukhiya Bilawal
- Bhaktimala: Ganesh Vol. 2 (Music Today; 1991) - "Jehi Sumirat Siddhi Hoi," "Jai Shri Shankar Sut Ganesh," "Jai Ganesh Gananath," "Ganapat Vighna Harana"
- Bhaktimala: Shakti Vol. 2 (Music Today; 1991) - "Jwalatkoti Balark," "Tero Chakar Kare Pukar," "Jai Jai Jai Giriraj Kishori," "Main Dharu Tiharo Dhyan"
- Bhaktimala: Krishna Vol. 1 (Music Today;1991) - "Madhurashtakam," "Mhari Surta Suhagan," "Kaisi Hori Machaiyi," "Sundar Badan Sukh," "Ka Karoon Na Mane"
- Bhaktimala: Namastotram Vol. 1 Ganesh, Rama (Music Today;1991) - Bhajans
- Young Masters (Music Today; 1992) - Raag Bhimpalas, Raag Shuddha Kalyan
- Raag Rang Vol. 1 (Alurkar; 1996) - Raag Bihag, Raag Bhinna Shadaj, Bhajan
- Raag Rang Vol. 2 (Alurkar; 1996) - Raag Madhuwanti, Raag Jhinjhoti, Raag Jog, Raag Nayaki Kanada
- Pandharpuricha Nila (Sagarika; 1998) - Abhangs
- Women Through the Ages (Navras Records; 1998) - Raag Ahir Bhairav, Raag Jaunpuri, Bhajan
- Krishna (Ninaad Music; 1999) - Raag Jaijaiwanti, Raag Vachaspati, Raag Megh Malhar, Jhoola, Bhajan
- Anandacha Kand (Megh Music; 2000) - Abhangs
- Ashwini Bhide-Deshpande Vol. 1 (Alurkar; 2000) - Raag Bilaskhani Todi, Raag Gujri Todi, Raag Nat Bhairav
- Ashwini Bhide-Deshpande Vol. 2 (Alurkar; 2000) - Raag Rageshri, Raag Durga, Raag Yaman
- Golden Raaga Collection (Times Music; 2000) - Raag Multani, Raag Gaud Malhar, Bhajan
- Swar Utsav (Music Today; 2002) - Raag Jhinjhoti, Raag Nayaki Kanada
- Navagraha Puja (Sony Music; 2002) - Bhajans
- Ashwini Bhide-Deshpande - Vocal (India Archive Music; 2003) - Raag Bageshri, Raag Kedar, Bhajan
- Roop Pahata Lochani (Self-published; 2004) - Abhangs
- Ragarachananjali (Rajhansa Prakashan; 2004) - Book and CD of self-composed bandishes
- Kari Badariya (Self-published; 2005) - Raagas Abhogi and Prateeksha, Jhoola, Dadra
- Sandhya (Sense World Music; 2006) - Raag Bageshri, Bhajan
- Soordas (Self-published; 2009) - Bhajans
- Unmesh (Self-published; 2010) - Raagas Vibhavati, Puriya Dhanashri, Raag Patdeep, Raag Manikauns
- Ragarachananjali 2 (Rajhansa Prakashan; 2010) - Book and CD of self-composed bandishes
- Arghyam (East Meets West; 2013) - Utsav Janasanmodini, Utsav Bairagi Todi, Utsav Nandadhwani, Utsav Charukauns, Utsav Pancham se Gara

== Publications ==
- Ragarachananjali (Rajhansa Prakashan; 2004) - Book and CD of self composed bandishes
- Ragarachananjali 2 (Rajhansa Prakashan; 2010) - Book and CD of self composed bandishes
- Madam Curie - मादाम क्युरी (2015) - Marathi translation of Eve Curie's biography of Marie Curie.
