= SNDT Women's University =

Public university in Mumbai, India

- Motto: 'Sanskrita Stree Parashakti' (An enlightened woman is a source of Infinite strength)
- Type: Public
- Established: 5 July 1916 (110 years ago)
- Founder: Dhondo Keshav Karve
- Affiliations: UGC
- Chancellor: Governor of Maharashtra
- Vice-Chancellor: Ujwala Chakradeo
- Students: Women only
- Location: Mumbai, Maharashtra, India
- Campus: Mumbai, Pune
- Website: sndt.ac.in

SNDT Women's University, also called by its full name Shreemati Nathibai Damodar Thackersey Women's University, is a women's university in the city of Mumbai, India. The university headquarters are at Churchgate in South Mumbai. While the main campus is at Churchgate, there are two other campuses: one in the Santacruz–Juhu area of Mumbai and another at Pune. The university has affiliated colleges in Maharashtra, Assam, Uttar Pradesh, Bihar, Madhya Pradesh, Surat and Goa, as well. Dhondo Keshav Karve played a key role in its establishment. He was inspired by novel on Japan Women's University in 1915.

== History ==
Dhondo Keshav Karve announced his decision to establish a women's university at the National Social Reform Congress in Bombay. The institution began as The Indian Women's University in 1916, with five students enrolled. It was the first women's university in India. Sir Vithaldas Damodar Thackersey pledged ₹1,500,000 in memory of his mother, Shreemati Nathibai Damodar Thakarsey. In 1920, the university was subsequently renamed Shreemati Nathibai Damodar Thackersey Women's University. The money was never completely paid. Today, there are over 70,000 students enrolled at the university. In 1936, the university headquarters relocated from Pune to Bombay. It has three campuses at Churchgate, Santacruz–Juhu and Pune.

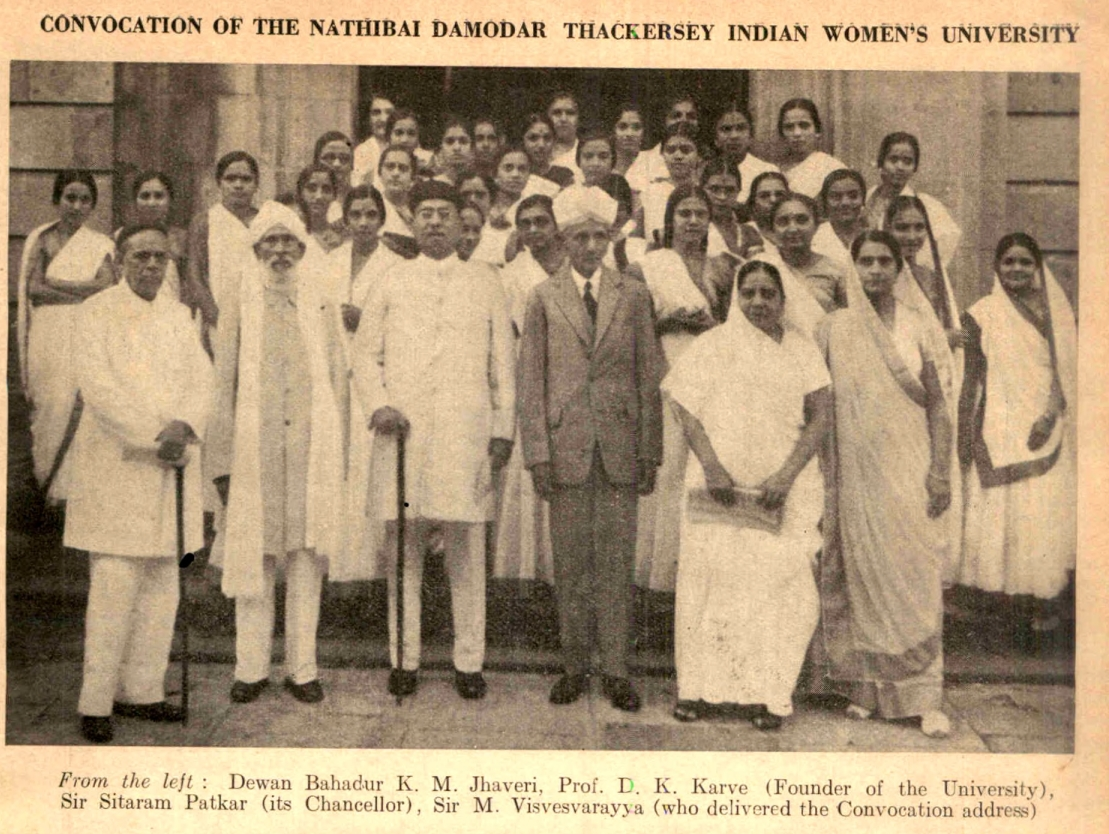
1940 Convocation

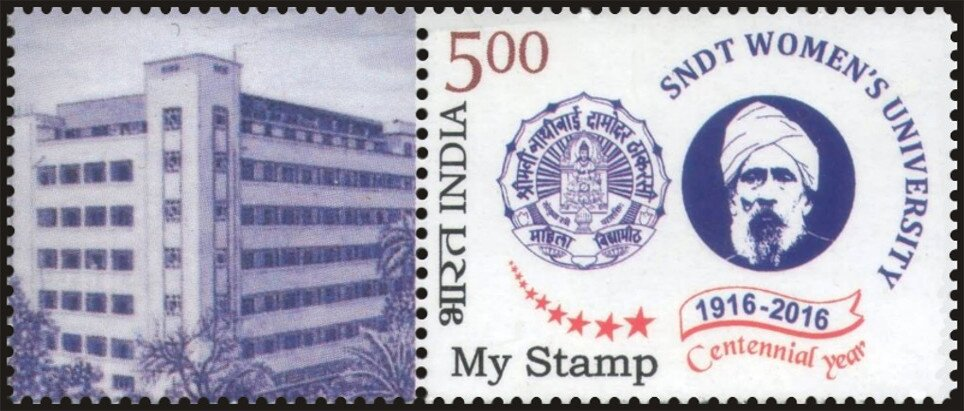
Postage stamp commemorating the centenary of SNDT Women s University, Bombay.

== Notable alumni ==
- Anita Dongre, designer
- Masaba Gupta, designer
- Neeta Lulla, designer
- Jaya Mehta, Gujarati poet and critic
- Chitra Mudgal, noted Hindi writer
- Rani Mukerji, Indian actress
- Rekha Kamat, Indian actress
- Heera Pathak, Gujarati poet and critic
- Shruti Sadolikar, Indian classical music singer
- Sonakshi Sinha, Indian actress
- Bharati Vaishampayan, Indian classical music singer
- Vasubahen, Gujarati writer
