= Sushila Rani Patel =

Indian classical singer (1918–2014)

- Born: 1918; Bombay, Bombay Presidency, British India (Present-Day Mumbai, Maharashtra, India)
- Died: 2014 (aged 95–96)
- Occupation: singer
- Spouse: Baburao Patel

Sushila Rani Patel (1918–2014) was an Indian classical singer, actress, vocalist, doctor, and journalist. She established Shiv Sangeetanjali, a school for classical music.

== Career ==

Sushila Rani Patel began her singing career in 1942 when she signed a recording contract with His Master's Voice music company. In the early years of her career, she was helped by Baburao Patel. In 1946 Rani acted in two films, Gwalan opposite Trilok Kapoor and Draupadias, playing the lead actor and singer. Both films fared poorly at the box-office. They were produced by Baburao Patel whom she later married.

Continuing with her singing career, Rani trained with renowned classical singers like Mogubai Kurdikar and later with Sundarabai Jadhav. In 1961 Rani and her husband Baburao Patel set up Shiv Sangeetanjali, a school for classical music. It was established to encourage classical music and also discover new talent. Some of her students were Pradeep Barot, Ronu Majumdar, Sadanand Nayampilli, Dhanashree Pandit Rai and Nityanand Haldipur. Shiv Sangeetanjali was later amalgamated into the Sushilarani Baburao Patel Trust.

Rani and her husband also ran a film business-related magazine called Filmindia, later to evolve into the more political Mother India. Rani and Baburao Patel wrote under the pseudonyms "Judas" and "Hyacinth". Their column was called Bombay Calling. Almost the entire content of the magazine was produced by them. Rani would personally conduct interviews with film personalities. She was close to actress Madhubala, who had started acting at a young age, and taught her to speak, read, and write English.

== Later years ==
In her later years, Rani was involved in a property dispute with the children and grandchildren of her late husband's second wife over the ownership of their House. Rani continued to run her classical music school until her death in 2014 at the age of 96.

== Awards ==
Rani received the Maharashtra Rajya Sanskritik Puraskar, and in 2002 the Sangeet Natak Akademi award.
