= Vamanrao Deshpande =

Vamanrao H. Deshpande (1907–1990, also known as Vaman Hari Deshpande), was an Indian music critic, musicologist and a prolific writer on the subject of Hindustani classical music.

== Career ==
Deshpande was a practising chartered accountant of fifty years' standing and a senior partner in the Batliboi Purohit chartered accountancy firm in Mumbai, India. He was initiated into music in his early childhood by his father.

He received training from stalwarts in three major musical traditions: in the Gwalior tradition by Yadavrao Joshi and Shankarrao Kulkarni, in the Kirana tradition by Sureshbabu Mane, and in the Jaipur tradition by Naththan Khan and Mogubai Kurdikar. He performed regularly on All India Radio, Mumbai, from 1932 to 1985.

For some years he was a member of the central audition board of All India Radio and the panel of judges of All India Radio's music competitions. He was for seventeen years a member of both the arts committee of the Maharashtra state Board of Literature and Culture, and of the University of Mumbai.

== Writings ==
Deshpande is the author of 'Maharashtra's Contribution to Music' (Maharashtra Information Center, New Delhi, 1972). His Marathi book Gharandaj Gayaki (1961) won the Maharashtra State Award for the best work in aesthetic criticism in 1962. The Sangeet Natak Academy, New Delhi, honoured the book as "Best Marathi Book on Music" in the period 1961–1969. Gharandaj Gayaki has been translated into a number of languages, including the publications Indian Musical Traditions in English and Gharanedar Gayaki in Hindi. It is a recommended reading in the music syllabus of many educational institutions across the country.

His second book, Alapini (1979), also received the Maharashtra State Award, and has been translated into a number of languages, including English, under the title Between two tanpuras. Deshpande has also written articles on musical subjects in Marathi and English and presented many papers at seminars and conferences.

== Colleagues ==
He and his friend Professor Deodhar are known to have started a new trend in music criticism.

Deshpande was for many years closely associated with renowned musicians, including Pt. Kumar Gandharva, Pt. Bhimsen Joshi, Smt. Kishori Amonkar among many others. He also acted as mentor and guide to many rising musicians of the time.

His son Satyasheel Deshpande is a well-known singer and musicologist in India.

== Selected bibliography ==
- Gharandaj Gayaki (1962)
  - Translated into English by S. Deshpande, as Indian musical traditions; an aesthetic study of the gharanas in Hindustani music (1973)
- Maharashtra's contribution to music (1972)
  - Translated into Marathi as Mahārāshṭrāce saṅgītātīla kārya (2010)
- Alapini (1979)
  - Translated into English by Ram Deshmukh, B.R. Dhekney as Between two tanpuras (1989)
