= Padma Talwalkar =

Indian singer (born 1949)

Vidushi Padma Talwalkar
- Born: 28 February 1949 (age 76)
- Origin: Pune, India
- Genres: Hindustani classical music, Jaipur-Atrauli Gharana, Kirana Gharana, Gwalior Gharana
- Occupation: Classical Vocalist
- Website: www.padmatalwalkar.com

Padma Talwalkar (born 28 February 1949) is an Indian classical vocalist.

== Early life ==
Padma Talwalkar was born in Pune, India. She received training in Khyal gayaki in three main styles or gharanas: Gwalior, Kirana and Jaipur. Her love for the accuracy and sanctity of notes she attributes to her first Guru, Pt. Pimpalkhare of the Kirana Gharana, and the latter to her training under the late Smt. Mogubai Kurdikar of the Jaipur Gharana. From Pandit Gajananrao Joshi she imbibed elements of the forceful and majestic Gwalior-Agra-Jaipur Gharana. She also gratefully acknowledges her musical debt to Smt. Kishori Amonkar whose musical influences remain with her even today.

== Personal life ==
Padma Talwalkar is married to well known tabla maestro Pt. Suresh Talwalkar. Their son Satyajit Talwalkar and daughter Savani Talwalkar are also tabla players.

== Noted disciples ==
Padma Talwalkar's notable disciples Includes Yashaswi Sirpotdar, Shalmalee Joshi, Gauri Pathare, Saylee Talwalkar, Rasika Vartak, Ankita Deole, among many others.

== Awards and fellowships ==
- Five year scholarship from the Bhulabhai Memorial Trust
- Two year fellowship from the National Centre for the Performing Arts (India) NCPA, Mumbai.
- Pandit Jasraj Gaurav Puraskar in 2004.
- Smt.Vatsalabai Bhimsen Joshi award in 2009.
- Rajhans Pratishthan Puraskar in 2010.
- Sangeet Natak Academy Award in 2016.

== Other notable works ==
- Her albums – 'Flights of Melody', 'Healing Mantras', 'Bandish' series – have gained wide recognition in the country as well as abroad.
- Padmatai has emerged as a major presence in the community of performing artists.
- She is a recognized All India Radio and Doordarshan artiste.
- She has performed at all major music concerts in India, such as Doverlane Music Conference Kolkata, Sawai Gandharva Mahotsav Pune, Tansen Sangeet Samaroh Gwalior, and Elephanta Festival, Mumbai.
