= Kishori Amonkar =

Indian classical singer (1931–2017)

- Born: 10 April 1931; Bombay, British Raj
- Died: 3 April 2017 (aged 84); Prabhadevi, Mumbai, India
- Spouse: Ravindra Amonkar
- Children: 2
- Mother: Mogubai Kurdikar
- Awards: Sangeet Natak Akademi Award (1985); Padma Bhushan (1987); Padma Vibhushan (2002); Sangeet Natak Akademi Fellowship (2009)
- Musical career
- Genre: Hindustani classical music
- Instruments: Vocals

Kishori Amonkar (Note: The given name is sometimes wrongly written as Kishore.) (10 April 1932 – 3 April 2017) was an Indian classical vocalist, belonging to the Jaipur Gharana, or a community of musicians sharing a distinctive musical style. She is considered to be one of the foremost classical singers in India. She was a performer of the classical genre khyal and the light classical genres thumri and bhajan. Amonkar trained under her mother, classical singer Mogubai Kurdikar also from the Jaipur Gharana, but she experimented with a variety of vocal styles in her career.

== Career ==
=== Training ===
Amonkar's initial training in music was by her mother, the classical vocalist Mogubai Kurdikar. She has stated in an interview that her mother was an exacting teacher, initially teaching her by singing phrases and making Amonkar repeat them. In the early stages of her career, she travelled with her mother to performances, accompanying her on the tanpura while Kurdikar sang.

In the early 1940s, young Amonkar began to receive vocal lessons in Hindustani classical music from Anjanibai Malpekar of the Bhendibazaar gharana and later received training from tutors of several other gharanas. Her tutors included Anwar Hussain Khan of Agra gharana, Sharadchandra Arolkar of Gwalior gharana, and Balkrishnabuwa Parwatkar. Amonkar has credited Anjanibai, in particular, with teaching her the technique of meend, or gliding, between notes.

=== Technique and style ===
"There is nothing called a gharana. There is only music. It has been bound in these gharanas and that is like dividing music into specific castes. One should not teach the students the limits of this art. There are none. But one has to understand the grammar. Which is why, one is taught the alankaar, the ragas."
– Amonkar on gharanas

Amonkar's later work in light music reformed her classical singing and she modified her Jaipur gharana performance style by applying features from other gharanas. She has been both praised and criticised for pushing the boundaries of the Jaipur tradition. She was a romanticist and her approach prioritised emotional expression over tradition, so she often departed from the Jaipur gharana's rhythmic, melodic, and structural traditions. Amonkar has criticised the idea that schools, or gharanas, of music determine or constrain a singer's technique. Amonkar has stated that while the Jaipur gharana's technique and methods form the base of her style, she performs several variations on it, including an adoption of alapchaari, or a relaxing of the link between the rhythm and note.

Amonkar has expressed her views on how musical education should be conducted, emphasising the importance of enabling students to move beyond repetitive techniques and learn the tools that allow them to improvise on their own. She credits her mother with using this approach to teach her, noting, "You have to walk and run on your own. The guru gives you strength to be able to do that. If you don't, then you remain ordinary. My mother made sure I wasn't ordinary." She noted that training is an ongoing process, and stated in an interview that she often listened to her own recorded performances to analyse and improve her technique.

Amonkar emphasised emotion and spirituality as essential parts of her singing, stating that "To me it (music) is a dialogue with the divine, this intense focused communication with the ultimate other." She has often spoken of music as an act of sublimation, noting that it is the sadhana (medium) to attain the sadhya (destination).

In 2010, she published a book in Marathi titled Swaraartha Ramani in which she elaborated her views on musical theory and practice.

=== Classical vocalist ===
Amonkar's career as a classical vocalist grew in the 1960s and 70s. Prior to this, she briefly stopped performing because of an illness that affected her ability to sing. Amonkar has said that she used this hiatus in her career to consider and develop her own style of singing, that transcended classical schools (gharanas) of music.

Amonkar has also spoken about the treatment of women performers as classical musicians, noting that the experience of watching her mother perform informed her own approach to professionalism and fair treatment, particularly when it comes to ensuring that musicians are paid well for their performances. On one notable occasion, she refused to perform because the audience was badly behaved, emphasising the importance of respecting the performers during a concert.

She created many compositions for a number of ragas. Amonkar was also a popular speaker and travelled throughout India; she was best known for lectures on the role of rasa (feelings or emotions) in music.

=== Light classical and popular genres ===
In addition to her career as a classical vocalist, Amonkar was known for her performances of lighter classical pieces, with a wide repertoire of thumris and bhajans, as well as some performances for film soundtracks. She sang for the soundtrack of the 1990 Hindi film Drishti. She became interested in film music and sang playback for the 1964 movie Geet Gaya Patharon Ne and Drishti . She decided to stay away from film music further because she found it compromising on the swaras over the lyrics, the essential element of any genre of music. Also her mother Mogubai Kurdikar disapproved of working in film music; Kurdikar is reported to have told Amonkar that she would be forbidden from touching her mother's tanpura if she would continue to work in the film industry.

== Personal life and death ==
Kishori Amonkar was born in Bombay on 10 April 1932. Her father died when she was 7 years old, leaving Amonkar and her two younger siblings to be raised primarily by their mother, the classical vocalist Mogubai Kurdikar.

Kishori was married to Ravindra Amonkar, a school teacher. The couple had two sons, Bibhas and Nihar. She was sometimes also described as "temperamental". Responding to these comments, Amonkar has stated that this reputation perhaps derives from her insistence that performers be treated respectfully, and to the fact that she chooses to spend time before her concerts in solitude and preparation instead of socialising with fellow musicians. Amonkar has stated, "I never play to the gallery. The audience cannot disturb the loneliness of an artiste." Amonkar did not enjoy giving press interviews.

Amonkar lived in the neighbourhood of Prabhadevi, in Mumbai. She died on 3 April 2017 in her sleep, at age 84, at her residence in Mumbai. That day, the Prime Minister of India, Narendra Modi, issued a statement on Twitter mourning her loss, writing: "Demise of Kishori Amonkar is an irreparable loss to Indian classical music. Deeply pained by her demise. May her soul rest in peace."

== Recognition and legacy ==
Amonkar received several of India's national awards and civilian honours, including the Padma Bhushan, in 1987, and Padma Vibhushan in 2002. She was awarded the Sangeet Natak Akademi Award for 1985 and the Sangeet Natak Akademi Fellowship for 2009. She was awarded the prestigious Dr. T. M. A. Pai Outstanding Konkani Award in 1991. In 2016, she was one of seven recipients of the M.S. Subbulakshmi Award for classical music.

Amonkar was recognised by several of her contemporaries and fellow musicians for her skill and technique in classical music. The tabla musician, Zakir Hussain, has said that Amonkar's performances of several ragas, such as Raga Bhoop, are "... landmark performances that take place over hundreds of years and you will talk about them for the rest of your life and rest of the many centuries to come." The Carnatic vocalist T.M. Krishna praised her approach to classical music, saying, "When Kishoriji sings she is not trying to be new but just by being with her music and continuing to submit to it, she has given classical music an everlasting newness and freshness. This is true creativity."

Amonkar is the subject of a documentary titled Bhinna Shadja, which was directed by Amol Palekar and Sandhya Gokhale. Several of Amonkar's students have become classical musicians of their own repute, including Manik Bhide, Maya Upadhye, Raghunandan Panshikar, Nandini Panshikar-Bedekar, Suhasini Mulgaonkar, Malati Kamat, Arun Dravid, Mira Panshikar, Sulabhatai Pishawikar, Meena Joshi, Vidya Bhagwat, Arati Ankalikar-Tikekar, Devaki Pandit, Sangeeta Katti, Manjiri Asnare-Kelkar, Papri Chakrabarti, Shivraj Shitole and violinist Milind Raikar. Amonkar's granddaughter, Tejashree Bibhas Amonkar, is also a budding classical musician and was trained by Amonkar.
