= Goswami =

Goswami, Goswamy, Goswammy, Gosammi, Gosami, Gosamy, or Gosammy is an Indian surname and honorific title used by Brahmins and Hindu ascetics. The term is sometimes also pronounced as, Gosain, Gosine, Gusain, Gosein, Gosyne, Gossain, Goshain, Gosai, Gossai, Gossayn, and Gosavi.

== Notables ==
Notable people with the surname or title Goswami include:

- Six Goswamis of Vrindavana
- Abhishek Goswami, Indian cricketer
- Abir Goswami, Indian actor
- Alpana Goswami, Indian actress
- Anay Goswamy, cinematographer
- Amar Goswami (1945–2012), Indian journalist and Hindi fiction writer
- Anil Goswami, Union Home Secretary of India
- Anjali Goswami, Honorary Professor of paleobiology at University College London
- Arup Kumar Goswami, Indian judge, chief justice of Andhra Pradesh High Court
- Arnab Goswami, Indian television journalist
- Ashokpuri Goswami, Gujarati poet and writer
- B. N. Goswamy, Indian art critic, art historian
- Beereshwar Goswami, An Indian Army Lieutenant who died in the line of duty in 2026 during an anti-terror search and destroy mission in the Rajouri district in Jammu and Kashmir. While leading his team along a narrow mountain ridge, he slipped and fell into a deep gorge.
- Bhairavi Goswami, model
- Bindiya Goswami, actress
- Brindaban Goswami, Indian politician
- Bhakti Prajnana Kesava Goswami, founder of the religious organization Sri Gaudiya Vedanta Samiti
- Bhakti Vijnana Goswami, Gaudiya Vaishnava guru and a leader
- Bhupendra Nath Goswami, Indian meteorologist, climatologist
- Bijoy Krishna Goswami, Hindu social reformer and religious figure
- Chuni Goswami, Indian professional footballer
- Dharendra Yogi Goswami, Indo-American scholar, inventor
- Dulal Chandra Goswami, Indian politician
- Debashish Goswami, Indian mathematician
- Debabrata Goswami, Indian chemist
- Dinesh Chandra Goswami, scientist, author
- Dinesh Goswami, Indian politician
- Acharya Dr. Gokulotsavji Maharaj Goswami, Indian classical singer, composer, and musicologist of Hindustani classical music
- Golok Chandra Goswami, academic, journalist
- Gopala Bhatta Goswami, foremost disciple of the Vaishnavasaint, Chaitanya Mahaprabhu, and a leading historical figure in the Gaudiya Vaishnava school of Hinduism
- Gracy Goswami, Indian child actress
- Hardwar Goswami, Gujarati language poet, writer, and playwright
- Hemant Goswami, social activist
- Himanish Goswami, Indian writer, journalist, and cartoonist
- Hitendra Nath Goswami, Indian politician
- Indu Goswami, India politician
- Jhulan Goswami, ICC Women's Player of the Year 2007
- Acharya Jnanendra Prasad Goswamy, Indian vocalist
- Joy Goswami, Indian Bengali-language poet
- Joyasree Goswami Mahanta, India politician
- Jitendranath Goswami, Indian scientist
- Jiva Goswami, philosopher and saint from the Gaudiya Vaishnava school of Vedanta tradition
- Karunamaya Goswami, musicologist and litterateur
- KK Goswami, television actor
- Kunal Goswami, actor, businessman
- Lajja Goswami, Indian markswoman
- Madhumita Goswami, badminton player
- Mamoni Raisom Goswami, Indian Assamese-language writer and Jnanpith Award winner
- Manoj Kumar (born Harikrishna Giri Goswami), Bollywood actor
- Mukunda Goswami, spiritual leader
- Morya Gosavi, prominent saint of the Hindu Ganapatya sect
- Mohan Nath Goswami, Ashok Chakra Awardee, Para 9 commando
- Manish R Goswami, television producer
- Moloya Goswami, Indian actress in Assamese-language movies and National Film Award winner
- Mamoni Raisom Goswami, Indian editor, poet, professor, scholar and writer
- Mihir Goswami, Indian politician
- Meenakshi Goswami, Indian film actress
- Goswami Nabha Dass, saint, theologian and author
- Nipon Goswami, Indian actor
- Omkar Goswami, Indian economist and journalist
- Parbati Kumar Goswami, Indian Jurist, Governor of Assam and Nagaland and former Judge
- Pitambar Deva Goswami, spiritual leader and social reformer
- Prabodh Chandra Goswami, mathematician and teacher
- Prabhupada Bhaktisiddhanta Saraswati Goswami, Hindu Philosopher, Spiritual leader and revivalist
- Prahlad Giri Goswami, politician
- Prashant Goswami, computational geoscientist, climatologist
- Acharya Radhika Prasad Goswamy, Indian Hindustani classical vocalist
- Raghunatha Bhatta Goswami, Saint and Hindu philosopher
- Raghunatha dasa Goswami, Hindu saint and philosopher
- Rajiv Goswami, Student leader
- Ram Narayan Goswami, Indian politician
- Rama Tirtha Goswami, saint and Hindu philosopher
- Ramakant Goswami, Indian National Congress politician
- Ravinder Goswami, Indian endocrinologist and professor
- Runki Goswami, Indian classical singer and composer
- Rupa Goswami, Devotional teacher (guru), poet, and philosopher of the Gaudiya Vaishnava tradition
- Sanatana Goswami, principal disciple of Chaitanya Mahaprabhu
- Satsvarupa das Goswami, writer, poet, and artist
- Shahana Goswami, actress
- Shivanand Goswami, poet and scholar
- Shreevats Goswami, Indian cricketer
- Shantidas Goswami, Hindu preacher
- Shyam Manohar Goswami, sanskritist, philosopher, spiritual leader, reformer and guru of the Krishna-centered Pushtimarg sect of Vaishnavism
- Shyam Sundar Goswami, Indian classical vocalist
- Srubabati Goswami, Indian scientist
- Sriman Prafulla Goswami, politician
- Suta Goswami (Ugrashravas), disciple of Vyasa
- Tamal Krishna Goswami, spiritual leader
- Goswami Tulsidas, Hindu saint and poet author of the epic Ramcharitmanas
- Udita Goswami, Bollywood actress
- Usha Goswami, nNeuroscientist
