= Dinesh Chandra =

Dinesh Chandra may refer to:

- Dinesh Chandra (politician), leader of the Bahujan Samaj Party in Uttar Pradesh
- Dinesh Chandra Bhandary (born 1934), Indian air force officer
- Dinesh Chandra Gorai (born 1934), Bishop of Calcutta
- Dinesh Chandra Goswami (born 1949), Assamese writer
- Dinesh Chandra Joarder (1928–2018), Indian politician
- Dinesh Chandra Sen (1866–1939), Bengali writer
- Dinesh Chandra Sinha (born 1935), Indian academic
- Dinesh Chandra Yadav (born 1951), Indian politician
- Dinesh Chandra Yadav (Nepal), Nepalese politician
- Dinesh Goswami (1935–1991), Indian politician
