= Gossain =

Gossain, Gosain, Gosine, Gosyne, Gosein, Gosai, Gossai, Gusain, Goshain, Gossayn, or Gosavi is a Hindi word derived from the Sanskrit: गोस्वामी, romanized: gōsvāmī, lit. 'lord of senses/lord of the cows'. It is used as a title in various Indian religious traditions.

These include:

- Gosains, a group of Hindu ascetics
- A title given to members of the Dashanami Sampradaya established by Shankaracharya

== See also ==
- Gosain, Indian surname
- Gosains
- Goswami
- Six Goswamis of Vrindavan
