= Harshvardhan Kadam =

Indian artist

- Born: Wai, India
- Education: IDC School of Design, Mumbai
- Alma mater: IIT Bombay
- Known for: Murals, children's book illustrations
- Notable work: Clock Tower of Haridwar
- Style: Tantra
- Movement: Spirituality
- Website: Official website

Harshvardhan Kadam, also known as Inkbrushnme, is an artist from Pune, India, best known for illustrating children's books and painting mythological murals on walls across the world.

== Biography ==
Harshvardhan Kadam studied applied art and visual communication at the IDC School of Design, Mumbai. He began his career in 2007 as an artist for comic books. After setting up Inkbrushnme in 2005, a unique studio that makes murals, illustrations, graphic novels, conceptual artworks for films and games, he completed his postgraduate studies at IDC.

His works include the Clock Tower at Har Ki Pauri, Haridwar, and India's largest mural at Yerawada Central Jail; a 300m-long painting titled 'Songs of the City', which depicts the story of the city Pune. A wall of the Planet Godrej displays his work. According to him "On the walls where I painted mythological characters, I figured that people stopped spitting or taking a leak there".

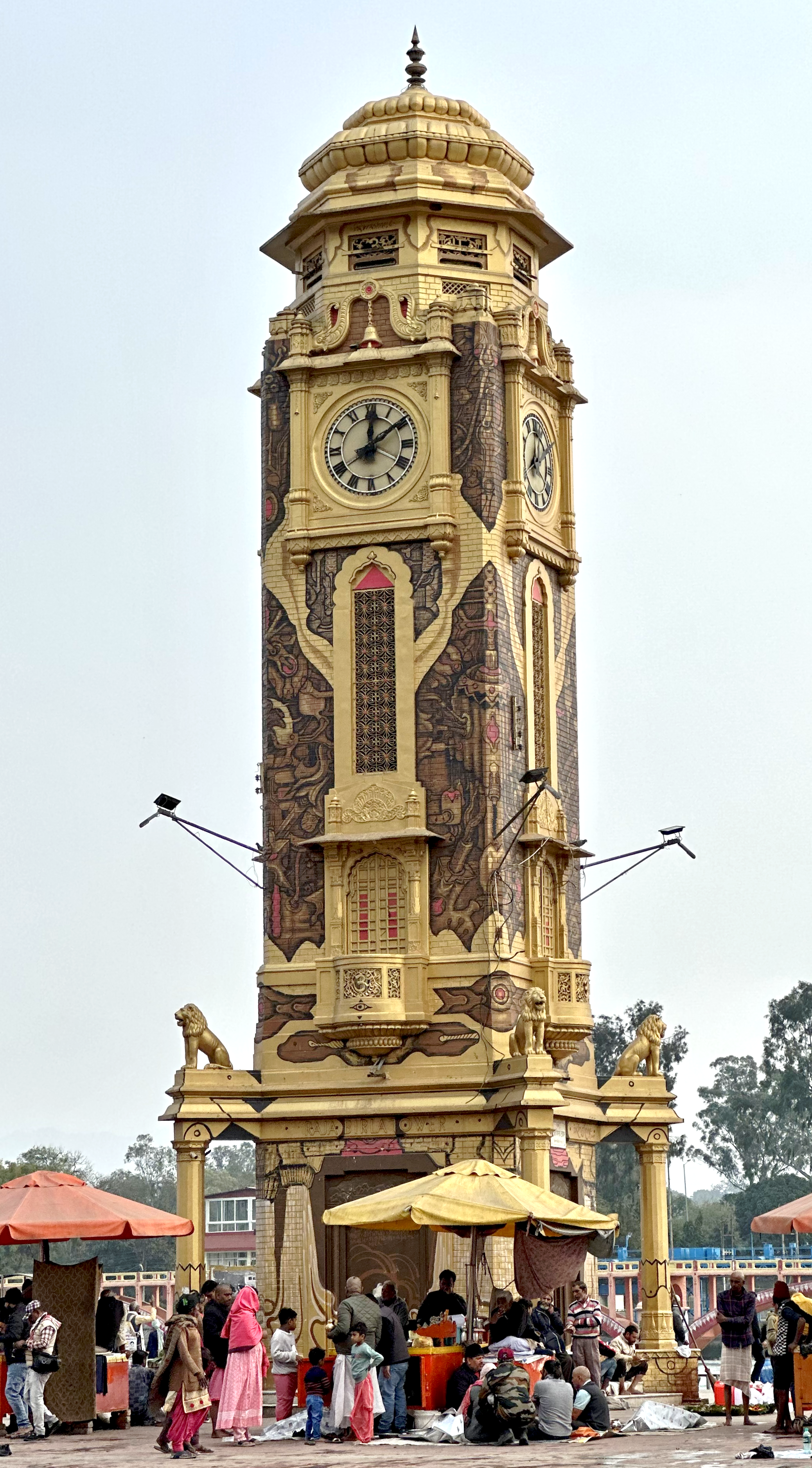
Clock Tower of Haridwar

== Selected publications ==
- Geeta, Dharmarajan (2010). Moon, Ramu and I. Young India Books.
- Deepak, Chopra (2007). Buddha, Story of Enlightenment. Westland Publications.
