= 2017 Patan riots =

- Location of Patan district (red) in the Gujarat state (yellow).
- Date: 26 March 2017
- Location: Patan district, Gujarat, India

Casualties
- Deaths: 2
- Injuries: 10
- Arrested: 14

The 2017 Patan riots refers to the riots between Muslims and Hindus in the Vadavali village in Gujarat’s Patan district.

== Background ==
According to the police the violence started following a minor fight between two students of different communities. Sunsar residents stated that Muslim students had beaten Hindu students and them being attacked by Vadavali residents when they reached there, while Vadavali residents accused Thakores of starting the riots.

The mobs attacked and looted around 50 Muslim houses and set them on fire including many vehicles. Two people were killed, and ten were injured,

== Aftermath ==
The Indian government deployed 100 police personnel and two companies of State Reserve Police at the village. In an official report sent to the revenue department, the district collector of the district, KK Nirala called the event a "Hindu-Muslim riot" and media reports said the violence followed after a fight between a Muslilm student and a Thakore student outside an examination centre. However, a report by Vadavali Nagrik Adhikar Samiti, an NGO formed by human rights workers and lawyers, stated that the violence was a well planned and organised attack on the Muslims residents by a team that included a member of the Bharatiya Janata Party. The police filed two FIRs, which included 31 people of Thakore community, and 14 Muslims. A total of 14 arrests have been made.
