= Clock Tower of Haridwar =

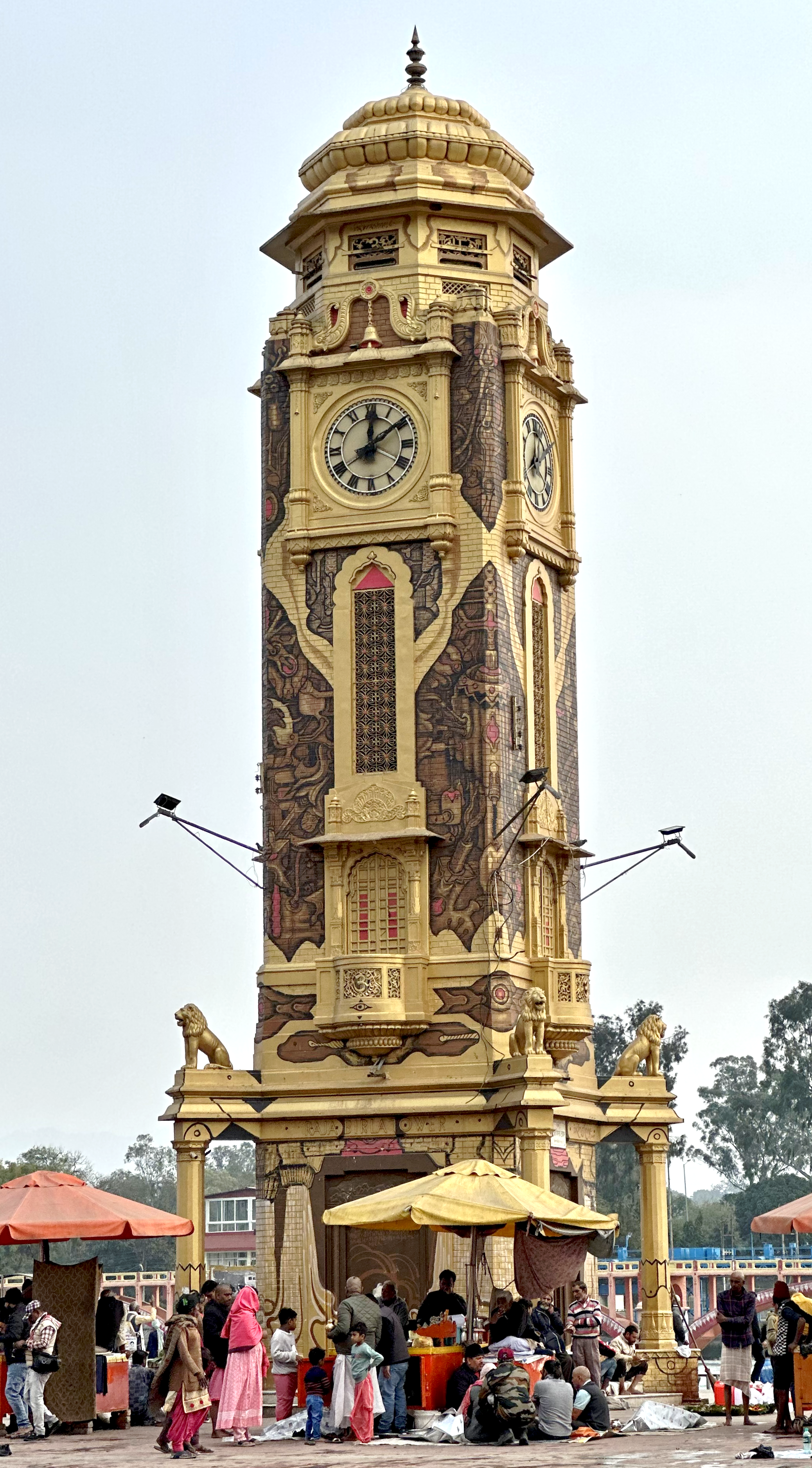
- Clock Tower of Haridwar: view from steps of Har Ki Pauri (2023)
- Interactive map of the Clock Tower of Haridwar area
- Alternative names: Raja Birla Tower, Ghantaghar

General information
- Type: Clock tower
- Location: Malviya Island, Har Ki Pauri, Haridwar, Uttarakhand, India
- Coordinates: 29°57′23.5″N 78°10′16.8″E
- Completed: 1938

Height
- Height: 66 feet (20 m)

Design and construction
- Architect: Raja Baldev Das Birla
- Known for: Landmark of Har Ki Pauri; Observation point for Ganga Aarti and Kumbh Mela

The Clock Tower of Haridwar, also known as the Raja Birla Tower, is a landmark freestanding clock tower, built by Raja Baldev Das Birla in 1938 in Haridwar, Uttarakhand, India. Each of its four sides has a clock, with Roman numerals representing hours and dots depicting the minutes. The structure marks a good location from which to watch the evening prayers at Har Ki Pauri.

The surrounding area has been used as a media platform for the Kumbh Mela. Prior to the 2021 Kumbh Mela artist Harshvardhan Kadam painted it in red and gold murals to express Hindu mythological stories based on the writings and ideas of the Vaimānika Shāstra.

== History ==
The Clock Tower of Haridwar, India. also known as the Raja Birla Tower and Ghantaghar, was built by Raja Baldev Das Birla, the founder of the Birla Group, in 1938. Many clock towers were built in India before it was common to own a watch. The tower daily evening Hindu prayers at Har Ki Pauri are easily seen from the tower. In 2010 a platform was constructed close to the tower from which nearly 300 media personnel watched the main bathing day of the Kumbh Mela that year.

The tower is on Malviya Island, named after Madan Mohan Malaviya, opposite the steps of Har Ki Pauri in Haridwar. The structure is freestanding and 66 feet (20 m) high. It has four sides, each with a clock face, that use Roman numerals to represent the hours and dots to depict the minutes. The surrounding island has marble flooring, is shaped like a boat, and has its own ghat (steps) to enter the river Ganges. Until 1979 it was connected to other local bathing spots by three bridges.

Prior to the 2021 Kumbh Mela, the artist Harshvardhan Kadam painted the tower with red and gold murals to express mythological stories based on the work and ideas of the Vaimānika Shāstra. The work was part of the Haridwar Mural Project, in collaboration with the Namami Gange Programme and art retailer Mojarto: a venture to find non-traditional platforms to display religious art in Haridwar and to safeguard the river Ganges.

== Gallery ==
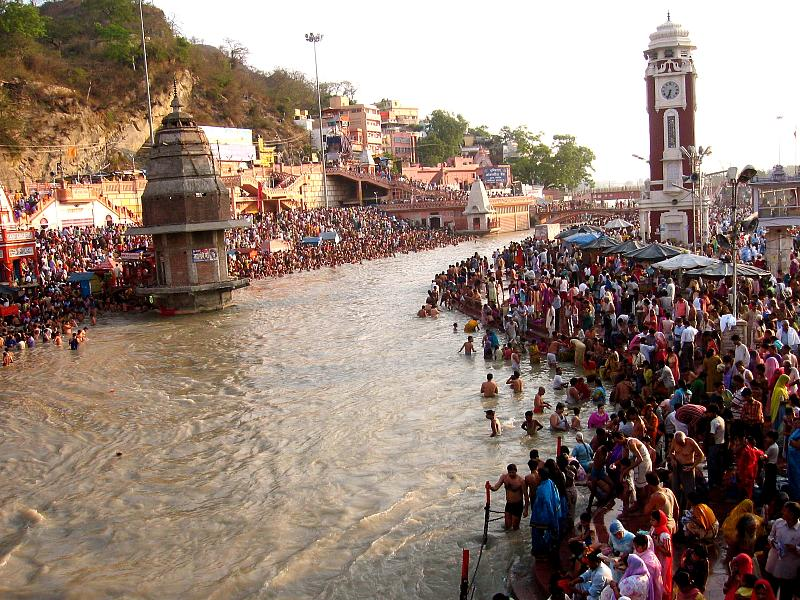
Clock tower (2005)

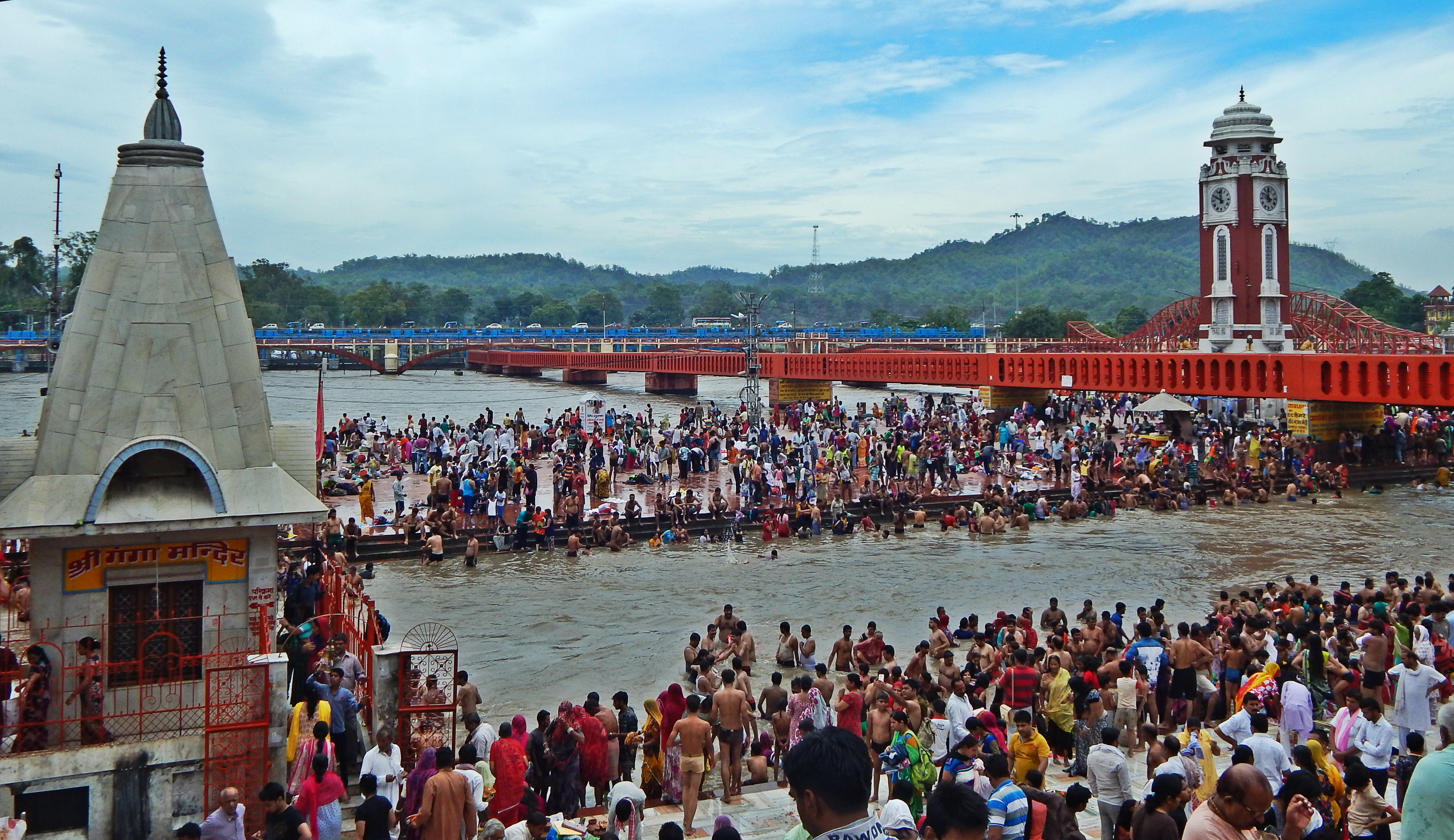
Clock Tower (unpainted) view from Har Ki Pauri (2010)

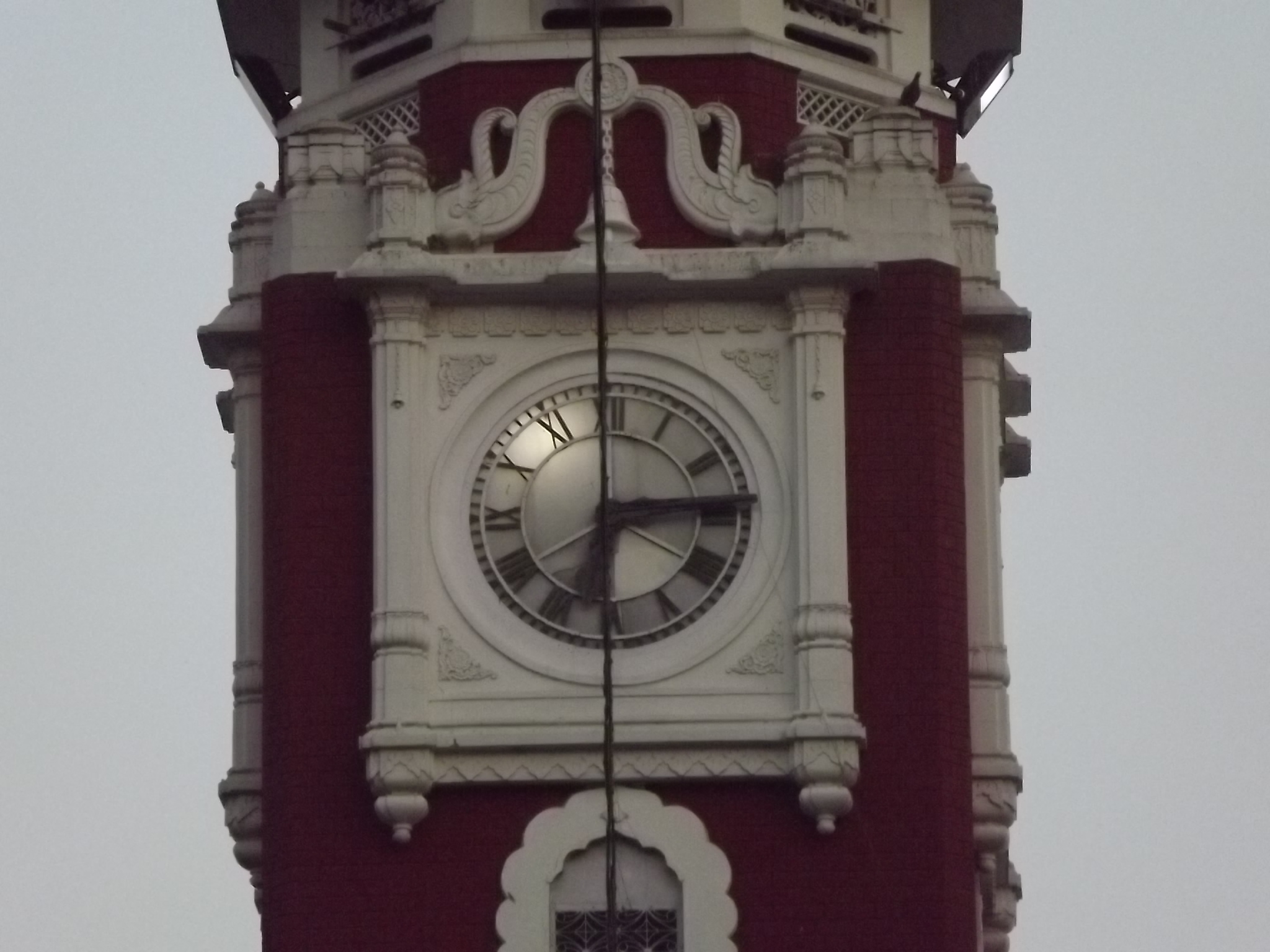
Clock face (2012)

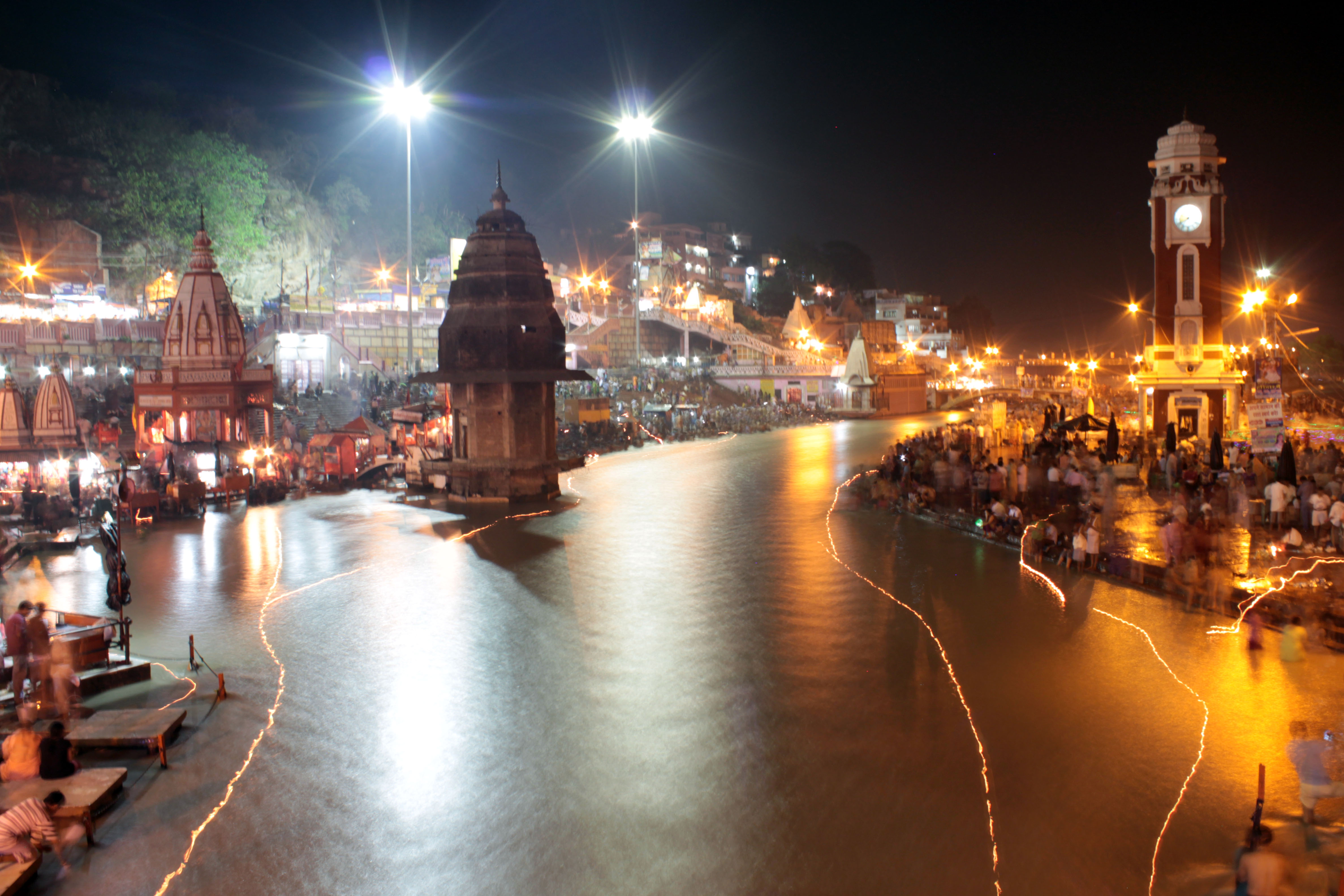
Clock Tower during evening prayers (2013)

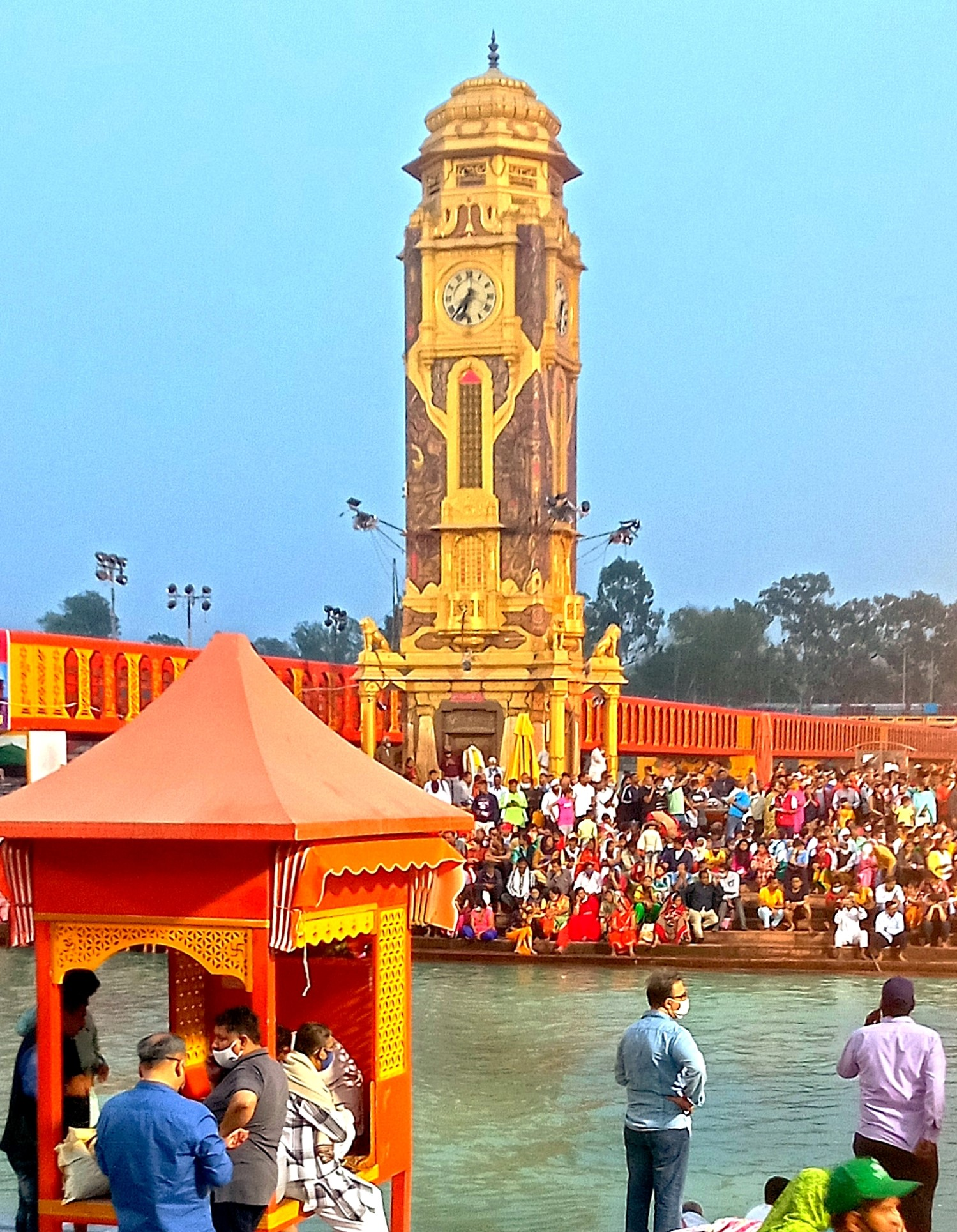
Clock Tower during evening prayers (2021 Kumbh Mela)

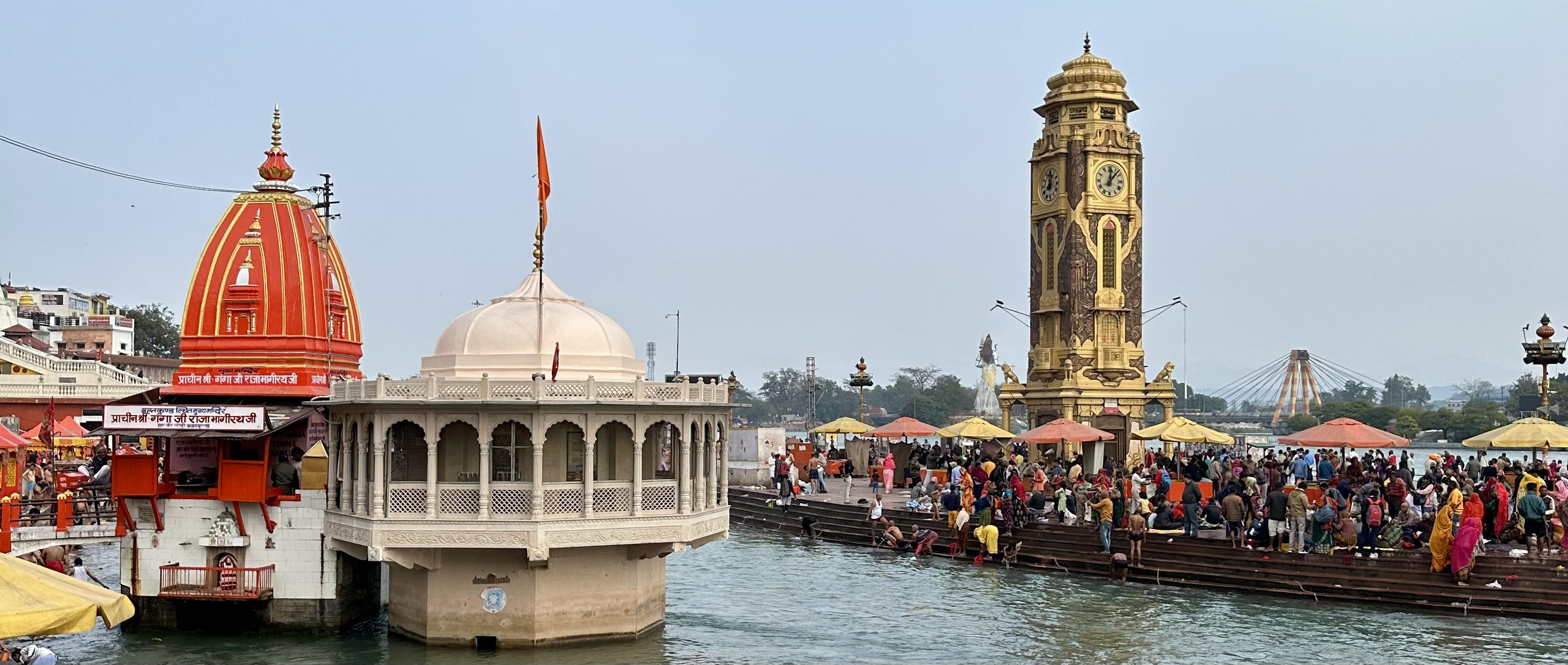
Clock Tower (2023)
