= Gosain =

Gosain, Gossain, Gosine, Gosyne, Gusain, Gosein, Gossai is an Indian surname. Notable people with the surname include:

- Colin Neil Gosine, Trinidad and Tobago politician
- Satpal Gosain (1935–2020), Indian politician
- Shivani Gosain (born 1975), Indian actress
- Jagat Gosain (1573-1619), Indian Mughal empress, daughter of Udai Singh of Marwar, wife of Jahangir, and mother of Shah Jahan

== See also ==
- Gosains
- Gossain
