= Gosains =

Hindu ascetics of India

Gosains, who are also known as Gossain, Gosine, Gossai, Gosyne, Gosein, Gosavi, and as Goswamis, are Brahmins, Hindu ascetics and religious functionaries of India. They are found chiefly in northern, central and western India, particularly in the Maharashtra and Madhya Pradesh regions. They have different histories by place and time.

== Etymology and origins ==
The name Goswami (or Gosavi) is derived from the Sanskrit word Goswamin, which translates to "owner of many cows." While it has been variously interpreted as 'master of cows', 'master of mind or intellect', 'master of senses or emotions' and 'master of passion', the term appears in Vedic literature with the specific meaning related to cattle ownership.

The institution is considered ancient, with references found in Vedic texts. The tradition traces its lineage to pre-Gosavya sages such as Bharadwaja, Parashara, Vyasa, Gautama, Shuka, Bhrigu, and Vasistha. The concept of the "householder saint" is also deeply rooted in their history; figures such as Dakshaprajapati and Shankara were householders, and the yogi Dattatreya is described in the Mahabharata as practicing the Grihastha (householder) ashram. The Goswamis have strong historical ties with the Rajputs (Kshatriyas) as they were highly respected and given high positions by the Rajput Kings. The Goswamis were also Gurus (teachers) and royal advisors of the Rajputs.

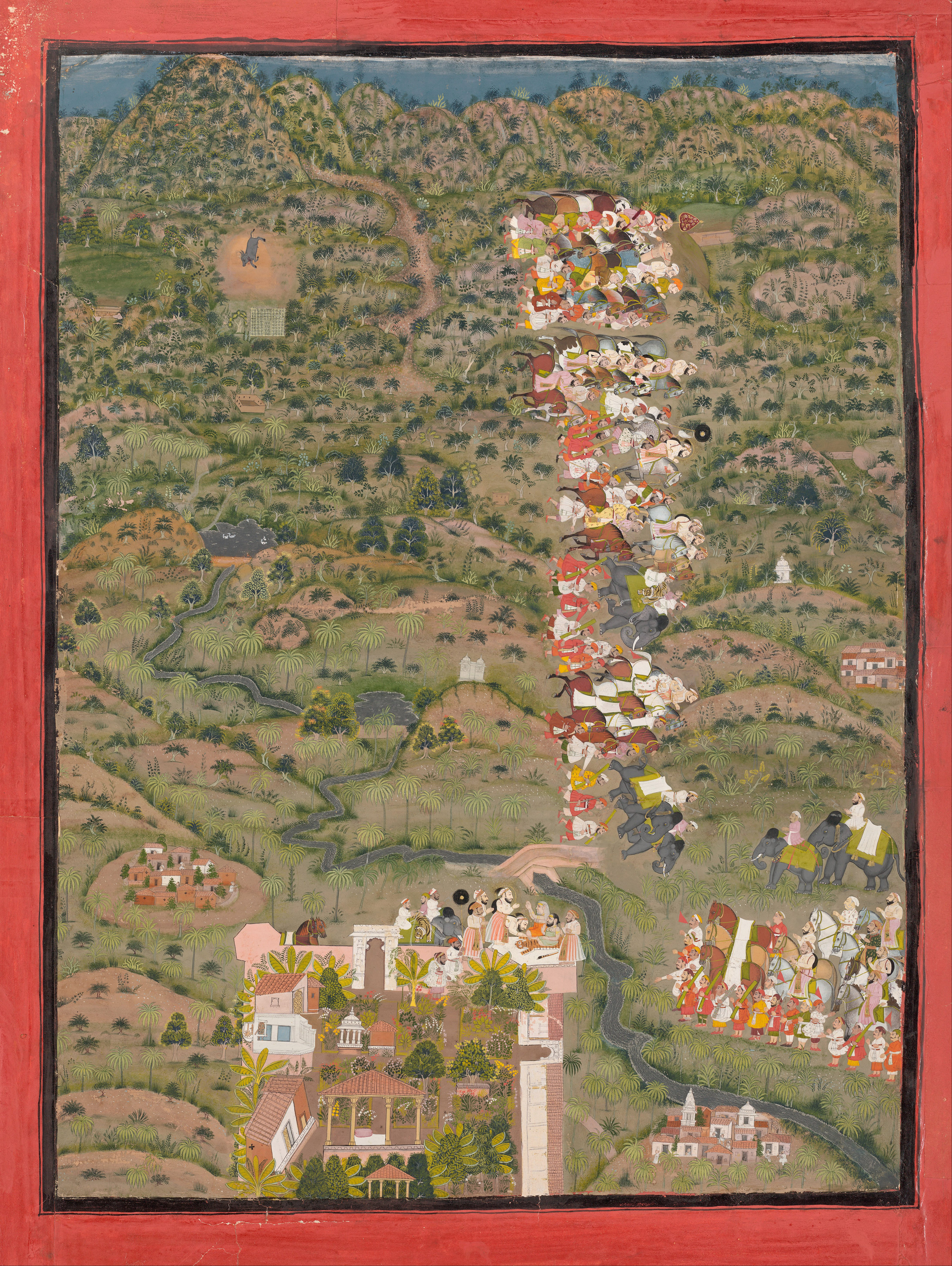
Maharana Sangram Singh II of Mewar visiting Gosain Nilakanthaji after a tiger hunt. (c.1725)

== Sects and divisions ==
There are two primary sects among the Gosavis: Shaiva and Vaishnava.

=== Shaiva ===
The members of Dashnami Sect, believed to be the first brahmanical order of ascetics founded by Adi Shankaracharya, use the surname Goswami, Gosain or Gosavi which means a man who has attained complete control over sense organs. The Dasnami Gosavis are divided into two groups: Mathdhari (those living in monasteries) and Gharbari (householders). Many of the married Gosains officiate as priests and religious teachers.

=== Vaishnava ===
In the sect of Vallabhacharya, the Pushtimarg, Brahmin religious leaders and spiritual heads of the tradition use Goswami and sometimes Gosain as surname and are addressed with the same as an honorific. Other Vaishnava traditions include the Mahapurushiya sect founded by followers of Shankaradeva, and the Gaudiya sect. The Gosavis of Madhavendrapuri and Ishwarpuri, who were in the Guru tradition of Chaitanya Mahaprabhu, established the Gaudiya Vaishnava sect in Bengal. Gurupooja (worship of the guru) is a distinct characteristic of the Vaishnava Gosavi.

The chief disciples of Chaitanya Mahaprabhu, namely the Six Goswamis, along with other followers and their lineages use Goswami as title and surname.

Painting of a Vaishnava Gosain, Narottamdas. From Cleveland Museum of Art, c. 1720-30

In the Ekasarana Dharma, a sect propagated by Sankardev, the hereditary heads and religious functionaries of Satras of Assam use the surname and title of Gosain and Goswami.

The Vaishnav Brahmins of region from UP to Bengal associated with Ramanandi sect started using the title 'Gosain-ji', which gradually replaced the term 'Guru' (teacher) as an honorific, and the same became a surname of Bairagi caste as well. The instance is reported by Buchanan in his memoirs while travelling in district of modern day Bihar. By 1910, the term was fully accepted as a credible title for both Shaivas and Vaishnavas as is reported in village-to-village surveys where Vaishnav temples are described as being erected or inhabited by Gosains.

=== Lineage types ===
The community also distinguishes between members based on lineage:

- Bindu: Gosavis from Aurus (biological) descendants.
- Naad: Gosavis from Trivarnika (three upper castes) who have been initiated.

== Customs and initiation ==
Entry into the Gosavi sect is not restricted by caste or religion; however, specific rituals such as the Virjahom purification are performed before initiating persons of the three upper varnas. Traditionally, Shudras are not initiated.

The initiation process for men typically involves a day-long fast followed by the shaving of the head, bathing, and covering the body with ashes. The initiate is given a new name and becomes a temporary Gosavi. After a probationary period of roughly two years, the guru whispers the mantra "Om Soham" into the initiate's ear, confirming them as a definitive Gosavi. Women who join the sect are required to cut their hair, wear saffron clothes, apply ashes, and live in a monastery while observing celibacy. Newly initiated members are often given salt to eat to encourage devotion.

Gosains were also Shaivite priests in most of the areas where their population was significant. They were often associated with Thakurbari in Eastern India and Mutts and Temples in regions like Braj where they possessed strong religious connotation.

== History and military role ==
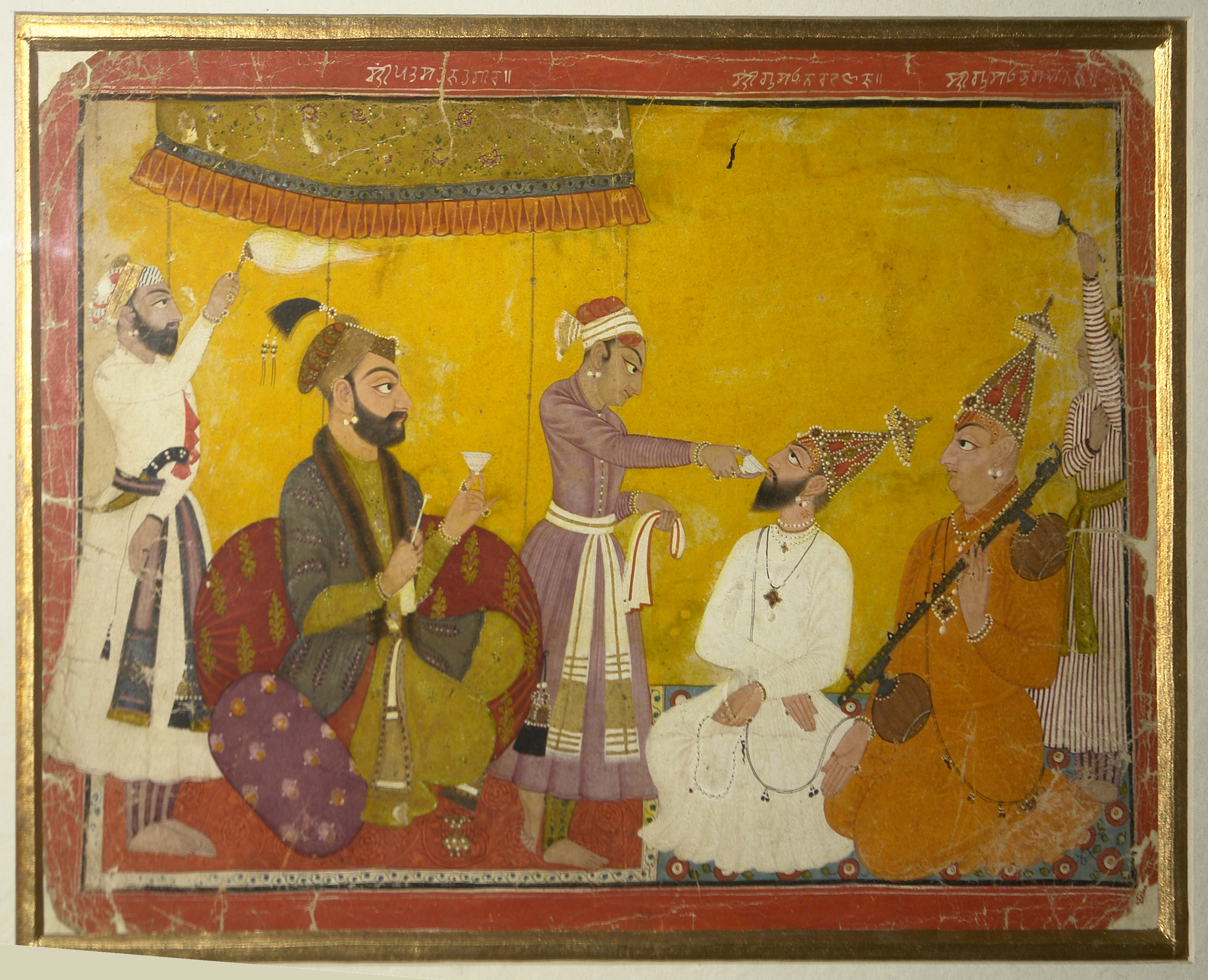
Mughal emperor Jahangir testing the strength of penance of Gosain Nirmalji and Bhagvanji, National Museum, New Delhi

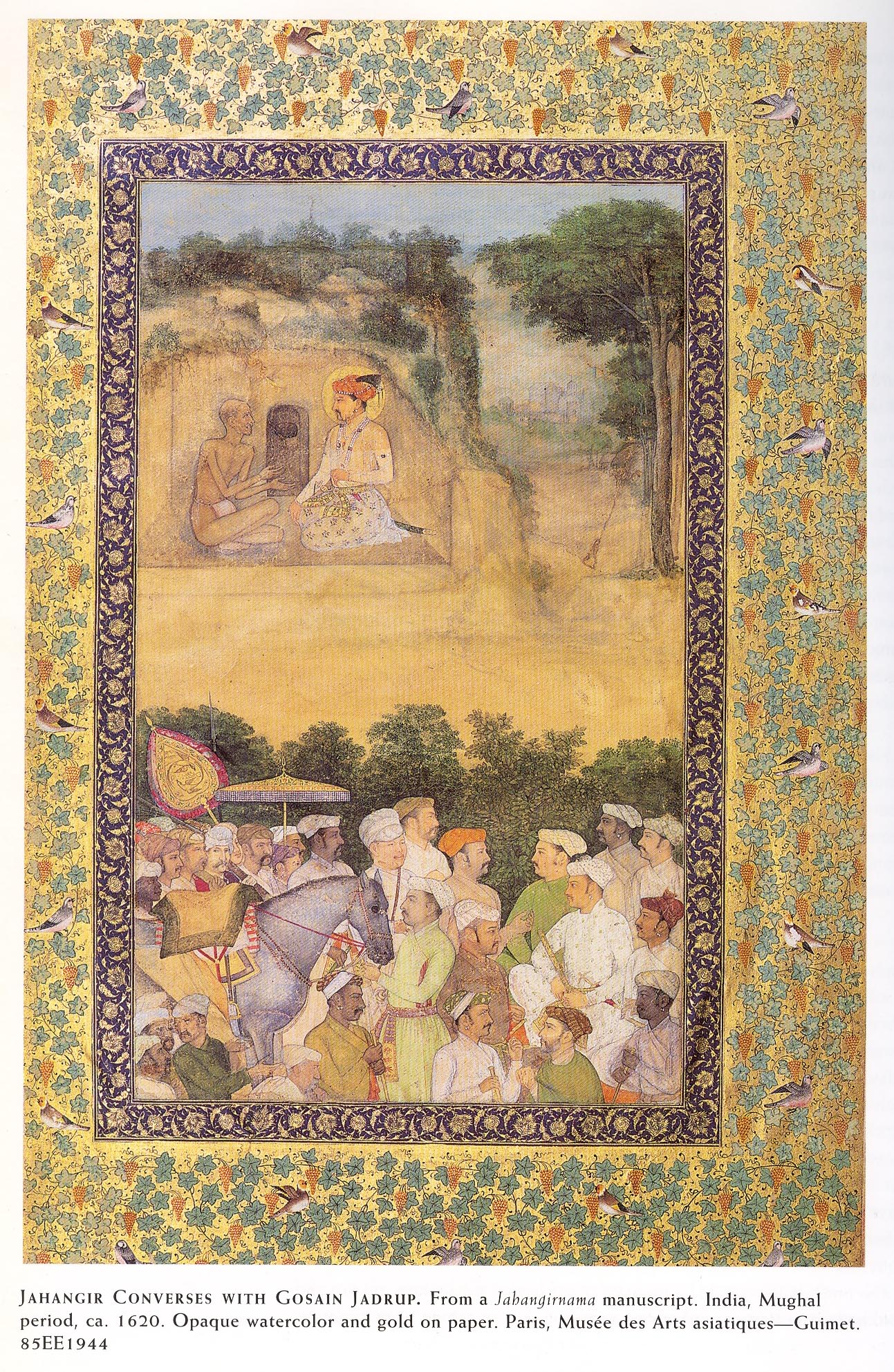
Folio showing Emperor Jahangir conversing with Gosain Jadrup from a Jahangir-nama manuscript, c. 1620

The Gosains have a long history of political influence and martial activity. During the reign of Chandragupta, small Gosavi kingdoms existed in India. By the 4th century AD, Parivrajak Brahmins (Gosavi kings) ruled regions in the Punjab (such as Jhajjar) and Bundelkhand. A dynasty of wandering Brahmin Gosavis also ruled in Tripura as mandaliks (feudatories) of the Gupta Empire during the Vakataka reign in Vidarbha.

By the end of the eighteenth century, the Gosains of the Dashnami sect became a politically powerful group in northern India and also held and enjoyed Jagirs, pensions and titles. They are sometimes referred to more generally as Sannyasis. A class known as "Kshatriya Gosavi" were active warriors who fought alongside Rajput rulers such as Prithviraj Chauhan, Jaichand of Kannauj, and the Chandel kings.

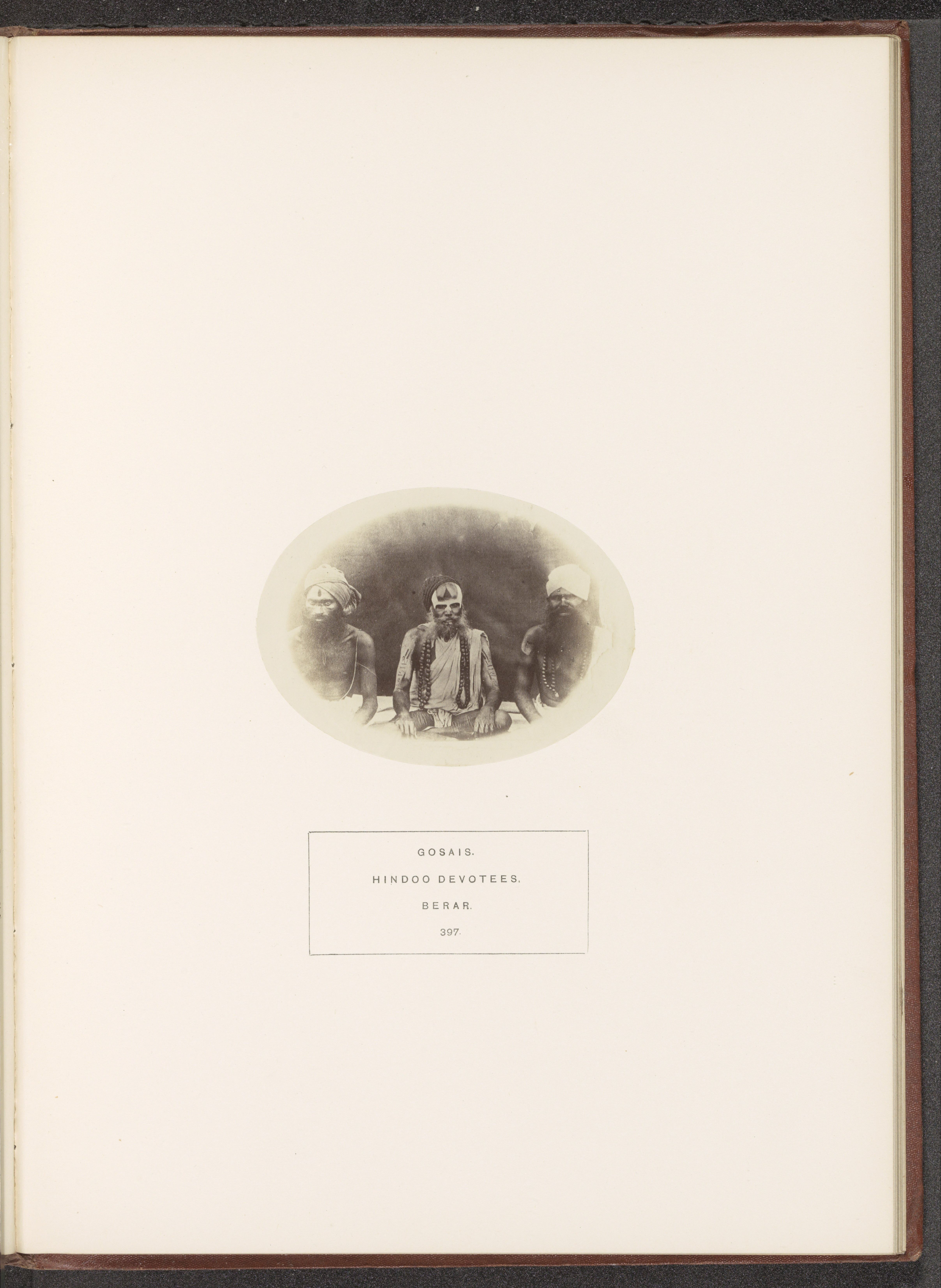
Group of Gosains at Berar c.1862

The ascetic Gosains were powerful nomadic and mercenary trading groups who undertook pilgrimages across significant areas of land and they were important to urban economies and the development of wider trade networks. These itinerant religious groups could be very large in number, with figures in excess of 50,000 being probable for those headed by figures such as Umrao Giri and Himmat Bahadur Anup Giri Gosain in the late 1700s. Their numerical strength enabled them to be self-protecting and also to protect the trade routes that they used, regardless of who might have titular power in any given place.

One out of at least three separate events that are grouped as Sanyasi Rebellion involved Gosains along with other instances of their frequent clashes with Company's army in northern frontiers of Bengal. Their movements were often dictated by religious festivals, both of a localised village nature and of a more widely celebrated type, such as Holi.

The community often faced internal and external conflicts. During the reign of Akbar, a fierce battle occurred between Bairagis and Gosavis. In 1760, at the Kumbh Mela in Haridwar, a major conflict broke out resulting in the deaths of 18,000 Bairagis and Gosavis. During the Mughal era, they suffered significantly under Aurangzeb and subsequently fought against him on the side of the Marathas. They also served in the armies of Mahadaji Shinde.

Many of the married Goswamis (as in North) of the South were priests and religious teachers. Historically in Poona in 1800s, they were traders and bankers and held most of riches of the city in their hands. Peshwa Baji Rao I had built the Vajreshwari Temple in Vadavali village whose hereditary priestly rights along with other 5 villages were donated to householder Goswamis.

In nineteenth-century Hyderabad, the Goswami Rajas, as they were termed so due to their influential participation in Nizam's administration and lending loans, established themselves as wealthy banking houses. An 1845 map, which names the city's most influential localities, mention 'Gosai Mhall' or the palace of Gosains in Begum Bazar with their locality resembling those of wealthy men and being termed as 'most opulent' in the city.

The Nawabs of Awadh, who ruled Oudh State in the 18th and 19th centuries and were Muslim successors to the Mughal Empire, recruited from Gosain martial brotherhoods as a way to assimilate influential Hindu elements of society and buttress their own sources of power. This attempt at creating a plural society was in sharp contrast to the zealotry that had characterised their predecessors.
