= Haridwar Kumbh Mela =

Mela held in Haridwar, India

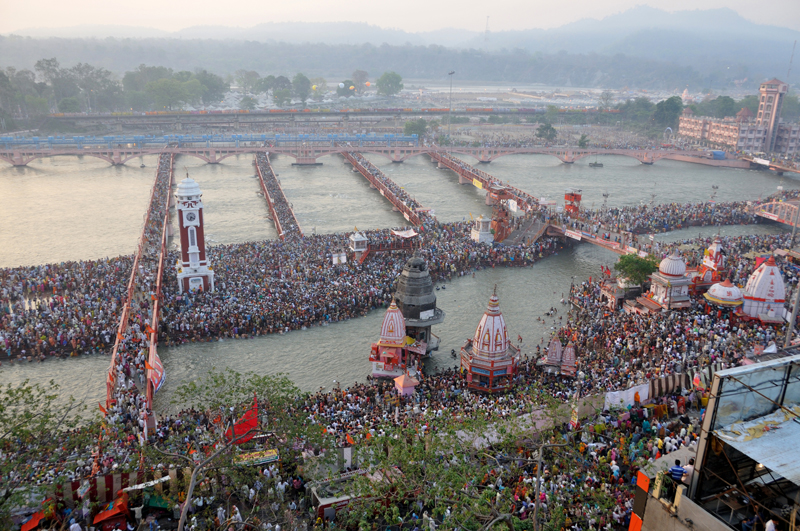
- Pilgrims gather for the third Shahi Snan ("royal bath") at Har ki Pauri in Haridwar on 14 April 2010
- Status: active
- Genre: Fair, Religious gathering
- Frequency: Every 12 years
- Venue: Banks of Ganges
- Locations: Haridwar, Uttarakhand
- Coordinates: 29.958°N 78.171°E
- Country: India
- Previous event: 2021
- Next event: 2033
- Participants: Akharas, pilgrims and merchants
- Sponsor: Government of India, Government of Uttarakhand
- Website: kumbhmelaharidwar.in

Haridwar Kumbh Mela is a mela, associated with Hinduism and held in the city of Haridwar, India held every 12 years. The exact date is determined according to Hindu astrology: the Mela is held when Jupiter is in Aquarius and the Sun enters Aries. The event possesses deep religious significance to Hindus as well as other spiritual seekers. Historically, it was an important commercial event and was attended by merchants from as far as Arabia.

The Haridwar Kumbh Mela had happened from 1 April to 30 April in the year 2021 amidst the COVID-19 pandemic. An Ardh Kumbh ("Half Kumbh") Mela is held six years after a Kumbh Mela. The last Ardh Kumbh Mela took place in 2016.

== Early records ==
Haridwar is one of the four sites of the Kumbh Mela, the others being Prayag (Allahabad), Trimbak (Nashik), and Ujjain. Although there are several references to riverside bathing festivals in ancient Indian literature, the exact age of the Kumbh Mela is uncertain.

The fair at Haridwar appears to be the original Kumbh Mela, since it is held according to the astrological sign Kumbha (Aquarius), and because there are several references to a 12-year cycle for it. The Haridwar Kumbh Mela dates at least from the early 1600s. The earliest extant texts that use the name "Kumbha Mela" are Khulasat-ut-Tawarikh (1695) and Chahar Gulshan (1789). Both these texts use the term "Kumbh Mela" to describe only Haridwar's fair, although they mention the similar fairs at Allahabad (the annual Magh Mela) and Nashik (the Simhastha). The Kumbh Mela at the other three places seems to be an adaptation of Haridwar's Kumbh Mela to the pre-existing local festivals.

The Muslim conqueror Timur invaded Haridwar in 1398, and massacred a number of pilgrims, possibly at a Kumbh Mela.

== Mughal era ==
Dabestan-e Mazaheb (c. 1655) of Mohsin Fani mentions a battle at Haridwar between competing akharas in 1640, possibly at a Kumbh Mela.

The Khulasat-ut-Tawarikh (1695), mentions the mela in its description of the Delhi subah of the Mughal Empire. It states that every year when Sun entered Aries during Vaisakhi, people from nearby rural areas would assemble at Haridwar. Once in 12 years, when the Sun entered Aquarius (Kumbh), people from far away would assemble at Haridwar. On this occasion, bathing in the river, giving alms and shaving hair would be considered as acts of merit. People would throw the bones of their dead into the river for their salvation of the deceased.

The Chahar Gulshan (1759) also states that the mela at Haridwar is held in the Baisakh month when Jupiter enters Aquarius. It specifically mentions that the fair was called Kumbh Mela and that lakhs of laymen, faqirs and sanyasis attended it. It states that the local sanyasis attacked the fakirs of Prayag who came to attend the mela.

By the mid-18th century, the Haridwar Kumbh Mela had become a major commercial event in north-western India.

== Maratha era ==
=== 1760: Massacre of Vaishnavites ===
The 1760 festival saw a violent clash between the Shaivite Gosains and the Vaishnavite Bairagis (ascetics). After the 1760 clash, the Vaishnavite sadhus were not allowed to bathe at Haridwar for years, until the British took control of the festival and disarmed the Saivites. According to an 1808 account by East India Company geographer Captain Francis Raper, 18,000 Bairagis were killed in the 1760 clash. Raper stated this in context of stressing the importance of deploying security forces at the event. In 1888, the District Magistrate of Allahabad wrote that the number of deaths "must doubtless have been greatly exaggerated" by Raper. According to historian Michael Cook, the number could have been 1800.

=== 1783: Cholera epidemic ===
A cholera epidemic broke out during the 1783 Kumbh Mela in Haridwar. An estimated 1–2 million visitors attended the fair this year. Out of these, more than 20,000 died of cholera within the first eight days. The epidemic was confined to the Haridwar city and ended with the fair. The neighbouring village of Jwalapur (now a town), which was around 8 miles away from the city, did not see any cases of cholera.

=== 1796: Massacre of the Shaivites ===
The first eyewitness British account of the Kumbh mela was an article by Captain Thomas Hardwicke in Asiatick Researches. At this time, Haridwar was part of the Maratha territory. Based on a register of taxes collected from the pilgrims, Hardwicke estimated the scale of the mela at 2-2.5 million people. According to Hardwicke, the Shaivite Gosains were the most dominant, "in point of numbers and power". The next most powerful sect were the Vaishnavite Bairagis. The Gosains carried swords, shields and managed the entire Mela. Their mahants held daily councils to hear and decide on all the complaints. The Gosains levied and collected the taxes, and did not remit any money to the Maratha treasury.

The Sikh contingent at the mela included a large number of Udasi ascetics, who were accompanied by around 12,000-14,000 Khalsa cavalrymen. The cavalry was led by Sahib Singh of Patiala, Rai Singh Bhangi and Sher Singh Bhangi. The Sikh soldiers encamped at Jwalapur, while the Udasis chose a place close to the festival site for their camp. The Udasi chief erected their flag on the selected site, without taking permission from the Gosain mahant. Offended by this, the Gosains pulled down the Udasis' flag and drove them away. When Udasis resisted, the Gosains responded violently, and plundered the Udasi camp. The Udasi chief then complained to Sahib Singh. The three Sikh chiefs held a meeting, and sent a vakeel (agent) to the Gosain mahants, demanding retribution for the plundered material, plus free access to the river. The chief Mahant agreed to the Sikh demands, and there was no confrontation between the two groups over the next few days. However, at about 8 am on 10 April 1796 (the last day of the Mela), Sikhs attacked the Gosains and other non-Udasi pilgrims. Prior to this, they had moved the women and children in their camp to a village near Haridwar. The Sikhs killed around 500 Gosains, including Maunpuri, one of the mahants. Many drowned while crossing the river in an attempt to escape the massacre. The British Captain Murray, whose battalion was stationed at one of the ghats, sent two companies of sepoys to check the advance of Sikh cavalry. The Sikhs left by 3 pm; they had lost around 20 men in the clash. The next morning, the pilgrims offered prayers for the English, who they believed, had been instrumental in dispersing the Sikhs.

== Company rule ==
In 1804, the Marathas ceded the Saharanpur district (of which Haridwar was a part at that time) to the East India Company. Before the Company rule, the Kumbh Mela at Haridwar was managed by the akharas (sects) of Hindu ascetics known as the sadhus. The Marathas taxed the vehicles and goods coming to all other melas, but during the Kumbh Mela, they temporarily transferred all the power to the akharas. The Sadhus were both traders and warriors. Besides collecting taxes, they also carried out policing and judicial duties. The Company administration severely limited the trader-warrior role of the Sadhus, who were increasingly reduced to begging.

1808 Kumbh Mela
East India Company geographer Captain Francis Raper published an account of the 1806 Kumbh in Asiatick Researches. To prevent a re-occurrence of the 1796 violence, an armed detachment of "greater strength than usual" was deployed. Maharaja Ranjit Singh was scheduled to visit the Kumbh in April 1808, and the Company deployed its Lahore envoy Charles Metcalfe to receive him at Haridwar. However, Singh cancelled his visit.

1814 Ardh Kumbh Mela
Baptist missionary John Chamberlain, who was in the service of Begum Samru at Sirdhana, preached at the 1814 Ardh Kumbh. He spent 14 days in Haridwar; for the first 4–5 days he attracted a few hundred Hindus. By the tenth day, his congregation had increased to at least 8 thousand. He preached in Hindi, which according to him, both Bengalis and Hindustani speakers understood; but he had difficulty communicating with the Punjabi-speaking Sikhs.
Chamberlain mentioned that the fair was attended by "multitudes of every religious order", and that a number of visitors came there because of "mercantile considerations". He was particularly astonished to see a large number of Sikhs, who according to him, outnumbered the Hindus. He also saw several Europeans, who came riding elephants for the novelty factor. According to the missionary records, an estimated 500,000 people assembled at Haridwar.
Secretary of Government Mr Ricketts complained to the Government about Chamberlain's preaching to the natives, fearing that it might result in trouble. The Government asked Begum Sumroo to dismiss Chamberlain from her service. The Begum made attempts to retain him, but finally, complied with the Government's demand.

1820 Kumbh Mela
A stampede left 430 dead during the 1820 mela. Subsequently, the Company government undertook extensive and expensive repair works on the bathing ghats. This move reportedly impressed the natives. The Asiatic Journal quotes one pilgrim as: "May your rule be blessed! May your reign extend for ages to come! You have produced a magnificent kumbh! You have turned the kali yuga into an age of truth and justice!".

== British Raj ==
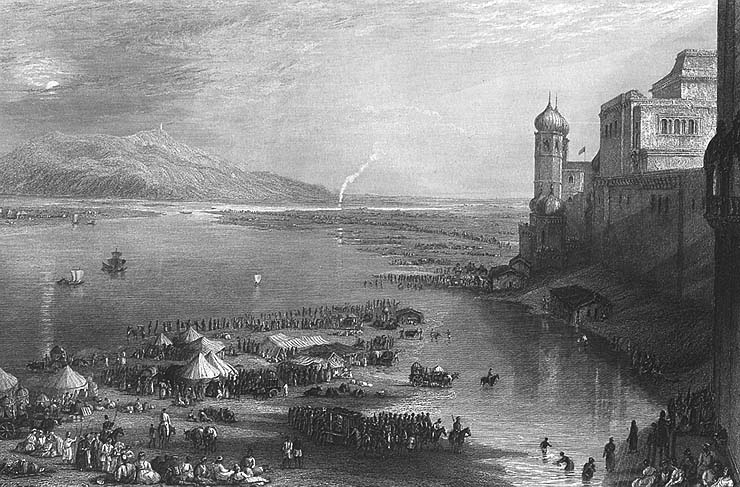
Haridwar Kumbh Mela by the English painter J. M. W. Turner. Steel engraving, 1850s.

After the 1857 uprising, the East India Company was dissolved and its territories came under the control of British crown. British civil servant Robert Montgomery Martin, in his book The Indian Empire (1858), remarked that "it is difficult to convey an adequate idea of the grandeur and beauty" of the Kumbh Mela at Haridwar. According to him, the visitors at the fair included people from a large number of races and regions. Besides priests, soldiers, and religious mendicants, the fair was attended by a large number of merchants: horse traders, elephant dealers, grain merchants (banias), confectioners (Halwais), cloth merchants and toy sellers. The horse dealers came from as far as Bukhara, Kabul, Turkistan, Arabia and Persia. Besides horses and elephants, several other animals were sold at the fair, including "bears, leopards, tigers, deer of all kinds, monkeys, Persian greyhounds, beautiful cats, and rare birds". Europeans also sold their merchandise at the fair. The fair was also attended by the dancing girls, who performed for the rich visitors.

Several Hindu rajas, Muslim Nawabs and the Sikh royals also visited the fair. Begum Samru of Sardhana would often come to the fair, with her retinue of 1,000 horse cavalry and 1,500 infantry. A few Christian missionaries also visited the Mela, and distributed copies of the Bible translated into "the various dialects of the East".

Martin mentions that the Brahmins collected the taxes, but did not perform any sacerdotal role in the bathing rites, which were performed without any priestly ceremonies. He states that in the earlier years, a number of people died in stampedes as devotees rushed towards the river bank. However, the danger of stampedes had reduced since the government constructed a new ghat and widened the road leading to it.

The police and civil magistrates were deployed to maintain law and order. The Sirmoor battalion of Gurkha soldiers from Dehradun was deployed to maintain peace.

=== 1867: Improved sanitation and traffic management ===
The pilgrim camp for the 1867 Mela was located a 9-mile strip of river-side land, and varied 2 to 6 miles in width at different places. According to a rough census of the pilgrim camp, taken on the night of 9 April 1867 by the British, the number of pilgrims was 2,855,966. The total number of pilgrims, including those who visited the camp before and after 9 April, was estimated at 3 million.

H.D. Robertson, the Magistrate of Saharanpur, led the Mela management. The administration strictly controlled the food supplies to prevent inflated prices, and ordered destruction of contaminated food to prevent outbreak of diseases. The 1867 Kumbh Mela was the first fair to officially involve the sanitary department of the British Indian government. Native policemen were deployed to detect cases of infectious disease, which people hid to avoid being quarantined and isolated from their relatives. In accordance with the Contagious Diseases Acts, the policemen also hunted down unregistered prostitutes and forced them to undergo medical tests. Public latrines and trenches for waste disposal were introduced during the 1867 Mela. However, they were not very popular with the pilgrims, many of whom continued open defecation near the fair site and in the nearby woods. A number of policemen were assigned to the "conservancy" duty, which involved preventing people from defecating in the open, and herding them to latrines. Many pilgrims, especially women, would abstain from relieving themselves during their 2-3-day stay at the fair.

Like the previous Melas, cases of cholera were reported at the 1867 Mela, but an epidemic was prevented. On 9 April, a grass-cutter belonging to the 14th Bengal Cavalry's station near Kankhal suffered from cholera. He recovered quickly under treatment. On 13 April, 8 cases of cholera were reported at the pilgrim camp. By 15 April, the number of cases had increased to 19, but this was a small number compared to the 20,000 cholera-related deaths in 1783. While the sanitary conditions and waste disposal facilities had improved, the containment of a potential cholera epidemic can be attributed to the fact that the ceremonies were largely over by the time the disease broke out. Pilgrims had started departing on the noon of 12 April, and by 15 April, the campground was vacant. It is possible that several of the departing pilgrims had been infected, and disseminated the disease across northern India. In the subsequent Melas, there was a large number of cholera-related deaths.

The 1867 Mela was also noted for improved traffic management. Special bridges were constructed to ensure a smooth flow of pilgrims from camps to the bathing ghat. Separate routes were designated for going to and return from the ghat, and a unidirectional traffic was maintained to avoid any stampede. For the first time, animals were not permitted in the town on the day of the shahi snan. During the next Kumbh Mela in 1879, the traffic arrangements were further controlled. The pilgrims were "marshalled in orderly lines" by the police. During the 1885 Ardh Kumbh fair, the policemen set up entry barriers for the ghats, in order to avoid stampedes.

=== Cholera outbreaks ===
Cholera-related deaths at Kumbh Mela in Haridwar
Year	Mela	Number of deaths
1879	Kumbh	35,892
1885	Ardh Kumbh	63,457
1891	Kumbh	169,013
1897	Ardh Kumbh	44,208
1903	Kumbh	47,159
1909	Ardh Kumbh	21,823
1915	Kumbh	90,508
1921	Ardh Kumbh	149,667
1927	Kumbh	28,285
1933	Ardh Kumbh	1,915
1938	Kumbh	70,622
1945	Ardh Kumbh	77,345

The next few Kumbh Melas played a major role in the spread of cholera outbreaks and pandemics. Mass bathing, as well as the practice of pilgrims bringing back Ganges water (which was contaminated) for sipping by relatives, transmitted the disease widely. Although the Waldemar Haffkine developed a Cholera vaccine, the British Indian government rejected the suggestions of compulsory vaccination for a long time, fearing possible public protests and political fallout. Following another cholera outbreak in 1945, compulsory cholera vaccinations were ordered at the 1945 Haridwar Kumbh Mela.

1891 Kumbh Mela - dispersed due to cholera outbreak
In 1891, a massive cholera outbreak in India resulted in 724,384 deaths. The sanitation arrangements at the Mela were further improved. 332 policemen, including 126 constables and 206 chaukidars, were deployed on the "conservancy" duty of preventing people from defecating in the open. However, a cholera epidemic broke out at the fair, and the Government of North-Western Provinces issued a ban on the fair to prevent its spread. More than 200,000 pilgrims were asked to leave the area, and the railway authorities were ordered not to issue tickets for Haridwar. At the end of the Mela, 169,013 cholera-related deaths had been reported in Haridwar. In 1892, crowds at the Mahavaruni festival, another river-side fair, were also forcefully dispersed because of cholera concerns. According to Leonard Rogers, following the fair, this cholera epidemic spread to Europe via Punjab, Afghanistan, Persia, and southern Russia; resulting in the Sixth cholera pandemic (1899–1923).
The Gaurakshini sabha, which led the cow protection movement, had organized its second meeting at the Mela. The British government's dispersal of pilgrims displeased many orthodox Hindus, who saw it as an infringement of their religious practices.

1915 Kumbh Mela
Delegates of regional Hindu Sabhas established the All-India Hindu Sabha, which changed its name to Akhil Bharatiya Hindu Mahasabha in 1921. Maharaja of Darbhanga Rameshwar Singh formed the All India Sanatan Dharma Sammelan.

== Independent India ==
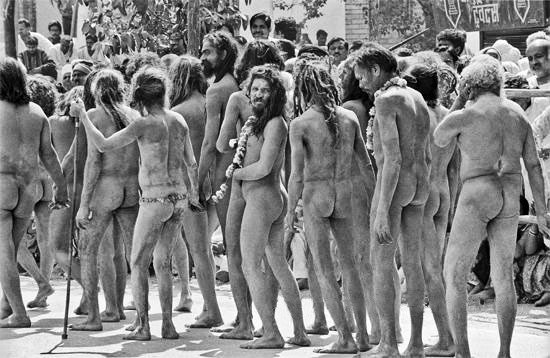
Naga Sadhus at the 1998 Kumbh Mela

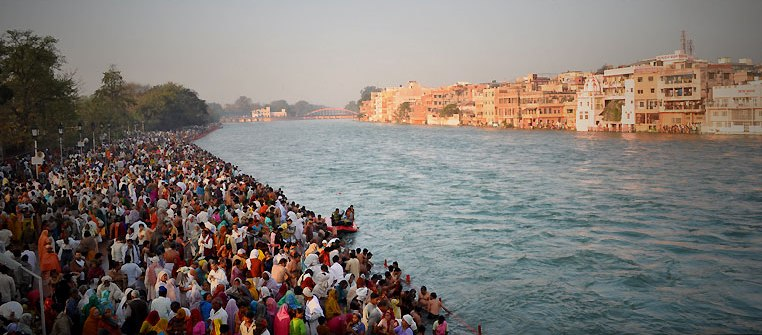
Bathing ghat on the Ganges during the 2010 Kumbh Mela

=== 1986 Kumbh Mela ===
Around forty-seven people were killed in a stampede on 14 April during the 1986 Kumbh Mela. For two hours, around 20,000 pilgrims had been waiting in a police cordon, to cross a bridge near Pant Dweep island to go to Har Ki Pauri. When some of them surged forward, the police resorted to a mild lathi charge. The stampede began when a person slipped near the Pant Dweep.

However, Inderjit Bhadwar of India Today praised the overall Mela arrangements, stating that Haridwar was "cleaner, and more sanitary than it has ever been". The administration, led by District Magistrate Arun Kumar Mishra, hired 5,000 sweepers to clean the 35 km^{2} Mela area daily. Thousands of urinals and outhouses were constructed. The administration constructed 20 bridges and several temporary roads. Tented colonies were established and rented at a rate of 5 paise per square foot. Ten filtration wells were constructed and the water pumping capacity was raised to 69 million litres per day. The power capacity was doubled with 100 km of electrical wiring and backup generators. Eighty new ration shops and over a hundred milk booths were set up. Forty first aid stations with eighty-five doctors were established. 10,000 policemen, including commando units and intelligence squad, were deployed to maintain law and order.

=== 1998 Kumbh Mela ===
The Government of India used the Kumbh Mela to promote tourism. Newspaper ads described it as "a rare opportunity for a soul-purifying experience". The Mela featured luxury tent facilities offered by private businesses, restaurants, badminton courts, bonfire pits, whitewater rafting and a Tyrannosaurus rex display.

=== 2010 Kumbh Mela ===
Haridwar hosted the Purna Kumbh mela from Makar Sankranti (14 January 2010) to Shakh Purnima Snan (28 April 2010). Millions of Hindu pilgrims attended the mela. On 14 April 2010, alone approximately 10 million people bathed in the Ganges river. According to officials by mid April about 40 million people had bathed since 14 January 2010. Hundreds of foreigners joined Indian pilgrims in the festival which is thought to be the largest religious gathering in the world. To accommodate the large number of pilgrims Indian Railways ran special trains. At least 5 people died in a stampede after clashes between holy men and devotees.

Indian Space Research Organisation took satellite pictures of the crowds with the hope of improving the conduct of the festival in the future.

Despite environmental improvements, the MahaKumbh mela remained a highly unsanitary event.

=== 2021 Kumbh Mela ===
The 2021 Haridwar Kumbh Mela was held during the COVID pandemic, leading to concerns that large crowds would contribute to the rise in COVID cases, making it a super spreader event. The government refused to cancel or cut short the event. On 5 April 2021, government officials expressed concern that the event might become a superspreader. When this was reported in the press, the Ministry of Health and Family Welfare responded with a tweet that it was "fake news".

The Union Health Ministry issued a list of Standard Operating Procedures to prevent the spread of COVID during the event, including a mandatory negative RT-PCR test report for the attendees. However, many attendees refused to follow the guidelines, refusing to wear masks or practice social distancing.

On 14 April 2021, 943,452 people took a holy dip in the River Ganges. Between 5 and 15 April 2021, 68 seers in Haridwar tested positive for COVID-19. During 10–14 April 1701 attendees tested positive for COVID. An unnamed senior Uttarakhand official said: "It is already a super-spreader because there is no space to test hundreds of thousands in a crammed city and the government neither has the facilities nor the manpower". Mahamandaleshwar Kapil Dev Das, head of one of the Hindu akhadas, or ascetic councils, died on 15 April 2021 from COVID-19. According to a report from Madhya Pradesh, 59 out 60 of Kumbh Mela returnees from Haridwar had tested positive for COVID-19 and 22 pilgrims could not be traced.

The Niranjani Akhara withdrew from the Shahi Snan scheduled on 27 April due to the rising COVID cases in Uttarakhand. After a number of sadhus tested positive, Prime Minister Narendra Modi appealed through the telephonic call with Acharya Mahamandleshwar Swami Avdheshanand Giri, of the oldest and largest Juna Akhara, and to the attendees to keep the Kumbh Mela symbolic. After which, within just a few hours of the call with PM, Swami Avdheshanand Giri announced the closure of Kumbh Mela, giving respect to the PM's appeal and with a belief that saving lives is a holy deed. Normally, Kumbh Mela lasts four months; Kumbh Mela at Haridwar had been limited to 30 days in April 2021.
