= Radhika Prasad Goswamy =

Pandit Radhika Prasad Goswamy
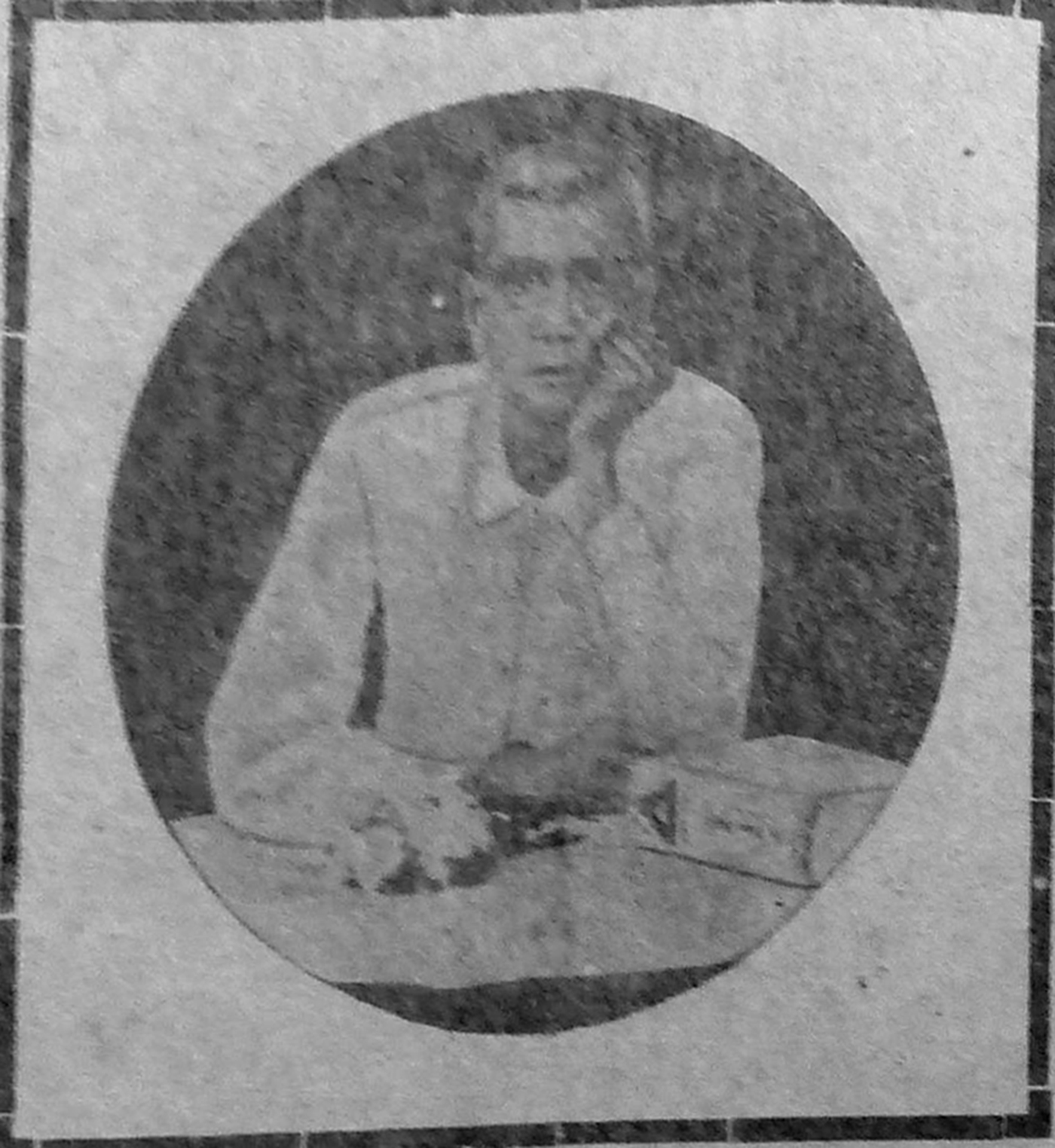
- পণ্ডিত রাধিকা প্রসাদ গোস্বামী

Background information
- Born: 25 June 1852; Bishnupur, Bankura, Bengal Presidency, British India
- Died: 5 February 1925 (aged 72)
- Occupation: Singer

Acharya Radhika Prasad Goswamy (Bengali: রাধিকা প্রসাদ গোস্বামী; 1852 – 5 February 1925), known as Sangeet Nayak (Bengali: সঙ্গীত নায়ক), was an Indian vocalist in the Hindustani classical tradition, based in the Bishnupur Gharana.

A renowned exponent of the Bishnupur Gharana, he was known for the Khayal, Dhrupad, Thumri and Tappa, along with Raga-pradhan songs. From Bengal, Radhika was the uncle of Pandit Jnanendra Prasad Goswamy.

== Early life ==
Radhika's journey to the world of Indian Classical Music was initiated at his home under the guidance of his elder brother Pandit Bipin Chandra Goswamy, who was a noted Esraj player.

His acquaintance were eminent vocalists such as Pandit Girija Shankar Chakrabarty and Ustad Faiyaz Khan. He received his music training from musicians of Betiya gharana of Bihar, as did other contemporary singers of the Bishnupur gharana.

== Professional career ==
For sometime after shifted from Bishnupur to Kolkata, Radhika Prasad Goswami used to live in the house of Raja Manindra Chandra Nandi at Kashimbazar, mentioned by Sri Jayanta Kumar Ghosh.

== Death ==
A Dhrupad composition notated by Radhika Prasad in the uncommon Raga Hem Khem appeared posthumously in the July 1925 issue of the magazine Sangeet Biggnan Probeshika. The article accompanying his obituary also mentions that shortly before his death he was awarded the second prize in the All India Music Conference at Lucknow, the first prize being given to Alla Bande Khan.

== Legacy ==
Radhika's nephew and disciple Pandit Jnanendra Prasad Goswamy along with many others carried out his legacy and teachings.
