= Shyam Manohar Goswami =

Indian guru (born 1940)

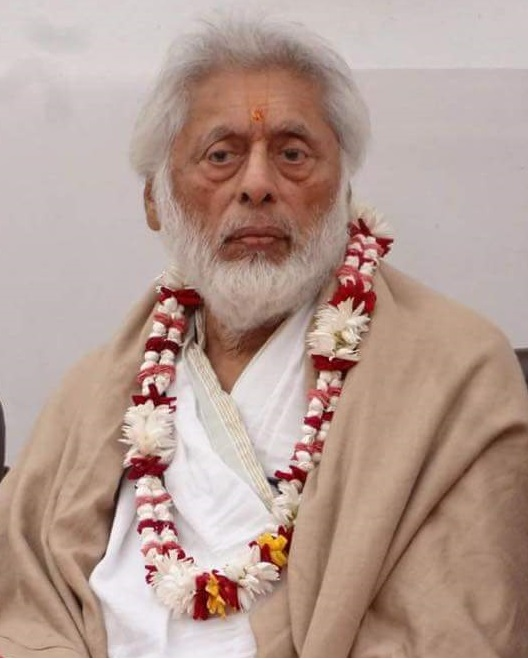
- Shyam Manohar Goswami in 2014
- Title: Goswami

Personal life
- Born: 26 June 1940 (age 85) Mumbai, India
- Known for: Scholarship on Vallabhacharya's treatises; Controversial stance on public temple worship

Religious life
- Religion: Hinduism
- Philosophy: Hindu philosophy, Shuddhadvaita, Pushtimarg, Vedanta
- Sect: Pushtimarg

Shyam Manohar Goswami (IAST: Śyāma Manohara Gosvāmī, Hindi: श्याम मनोहर गोस्वामी, Gujarati: શ્યામ મનોહર ગોસ્વામી); born 26 June 1940, also known as Shyamu Bava (IAST: Śyāmu Bāvā, Hindi: श्यामु बावा, Gujarati: શ્યામુ બાવા), is a prominent and contentious hereditary leader (Goswami) of the Pushtimarg tradition of Vaishnavism, based in Mumbai. He is the 16th lineal descendant of Vallabhacharya and is recognized as one of the Pushtimarg's most prolific living hereditary leaders.

He belongs to the first house of the Pushtimarg. His ancestral lineage had settled in Kishangarh by the eighteenth century, and by the nineteenth century his family had moved to Mumbai. He is noted for his combination of traditional Pushtimargi training and modern academic research, having authored or edited numerous volumes of philosophical treatises. He is particularly known for his controversial theological positions regarding temple worship, arguing against the legitimacy of public haveli temples (such as the Shrinathji Temple in Nathdwara) in favor of domestic worship. Shyam Manohar Goswami's opinions on temples and vittajā sevā (financial donations) are generally opposed by other goswamis, and in 1992 he debated Goswami Hariray in the Puṣṭi Siddhānt Carcā Sabhā.

== Preaching style ==
Goswami's public discourse style is considered distinct from his counterparts. He often streams lectures live on social media to thousands of viewers. His exegetical technique involves:

- Focus on doctrine: He presumes his audience has read the narratives beforehand and draws connections between hagiographies and Vallabhacharya’s core philosophical teachings (siddhānt).
- Contemporary application: He utilizes a distinct style of Braj Bhasha-inflected Hindi, incorporating humor, psychoanalysis, and modern references (such as television serials) to apply ancient texts to modern life.
- Vacanāmṛt: He focuses on reading sections of texts that feature Vallabhacharya's direct speech, which his followers regard as vacanāmṛt ("nectarous speech").

== Views on temple worship and sevā ==
Shyam Manohar Goswami is one of the most vocal opponents of temple renovation and expansion within the sect, particularly regarding the Shrinathji havelī in Nathdwara. He bases these controversial positions on strict textual interpretations of Pushtimargi literature.

=== Rejection of public worship ===
He contends that Pushtimargi devotional literature does not support the public (jāher) worship of Krishna deities. He argues that public temples like the one in Nathdwara are fundamentally illegitimate institutions built to support "money-powered religious observances." He asserts that Vallabhacharya's teachings focus on domestic sevā (service), emphasizing the instruction gṛhe sthitvā svadharmataḥ ("remain a householder and follow one’s own dharma") as a mandate for devotees to perform service within the home.

=== Views on financial donations ===
Goswami opposes the practice of vittajā sevā (service via financial donation) when it replaces the physical, personal performance of service for one's household icon (svarūp). He argues that donating material wealth should only be done to one's personal Krishna icon, not to the icon of a guru or another devotee, according to Vallabhacharya.

=== Opposition to Nathdwara Temple ===
Regarding Nathdwara, he has argued that the use of paid sevaks (servants) in Nathdwara compromises the "purity" of the service. He has publicly claimed that the sacred presence of deity Shrinathji has departed from Nathdwara, leaving behind only an inert statue in the temple. He has taken active legal action against temple developments, including filing a petition against the Nathdwara temple board in the Rajasthan High Court in 2005.

=== Substitute institutional base ===
To promote his views outside the temple system, he founded the Vallabhacharya Vidyapith in Halol, Gujarat, as a substitute institutional base. This institute is funded by a trust that supports non-temple activities, such as education and publication. In 1992, he participated in the Puṣṭi Siddhānt Carcā Sabhā ("The Pushti Doctrine Colloquium") in Mumbai, formally debating other hereditary leaders on these doctrinal points.

== Scholarship ==
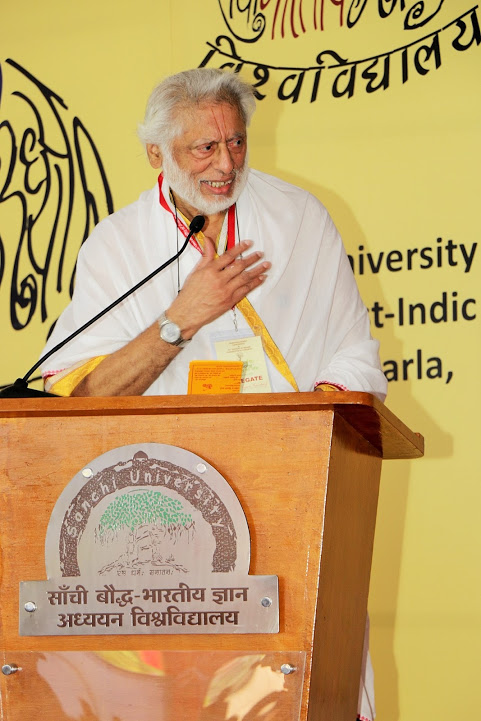
Shyam Manohar Goswami giving lecture at the Indian philosophical congress, Sanchi University of Buddhist-Indic Studies – 2017

Shyam Manohar Goswami is a prolific author who has received both traditional sectarian training and academic training. He is credited with authoring numerous publications, including edited volumes of Vallabhacharya’s philosophical treatises, such as the Ṣoḍaśagrantha. He has also written commentaries on most of Vallabha's works, including all sixteen treatises. To make these texts accessible, he has published transcribed pravacans (religious lectures) and commentaries online, such as Vārtānkī Saiddhāntik Saṅgati. In this specific publication, he included an appendix listing every instance of Vallabhacharya's vacanāmṛt ("nectarous speech") that appears in the hagiographies under consideration.

He presented a lecture on Vallabh Vedanta at the 91st session of the Indian Philosophical Congress held in February 2017 at the Sanchi University of Buddhist-Indic Studies in Madhya Pradesh, India.

Pandit Jasraj has conducted research in Haveli Sangeet under Shyam Manohar Goswami to create numerous innovative bandish (compositions).

== Bibliography ==
=== Books ===
- Mahāprabhu Śrī Vallabhācārya, Sanskrit, 1995
- Puṣṭividhānam, Sanskrit, 1995
- Prasthānaratnākaraḥ, Sanskrit, 1999
- Anyākhyativadya vidvatsaṅgoṣṭhī, Sanskrit, 2002
- ́Srīmadvallabhamahāprabhustotrāṇi, Sanskrit, 2005
- Srīpuruṣottamapratiṣṭhāprakāraḥ, Hindi, 2005
- Adhunik nyāyapraṇālī aura pushṭimārgīya sādhanāpraṇālī kā āpasī ṭakarāva, Hindi, 2006
- Gr̥hasevā aura Vrajalīlā, Hindi, 2006
- Vallabhvedanta nibandha saṅgraha, Hindi, 2006
- Pratyakṣapramā : vidvatsaṅgoṣṭhī, Sanskrit, 2007
- Vādāvalī : Brahmavādapramukhānām anekavādānāṃ saṅkalanarūpa, Sanskrit, 2008
- Viśodhanikā, Hindi, 2008
- Brahmavāda : Vādāvalī sampādakīya, Hindi, 2008
- Pushti Siddhant Achariya Sabha, Gujarati, 1992
- Balkrishna Granthvali, Gujarati, 1999
- Bhagvatseva no Suddh Prakar, Gujarati, Hindu Samvatsara 2050
- Seva kaumudi, Hindi, Hindu Samvatsara 2064
- Pushti Bhakti Tatha Sharnagati Mai Fal, Hindu Samvatsara 2068
- Purusharth Vyavastha – Dharm Arth Kaam Moksh, Hindi, Hindu Samvatsara 2068
- Anubhashya nu Adhyayan, Hindi, Hindu Samvatsara 2068
- Navratna Updesh Manas Shastriya Vishleshan, Hindi, Hindu Samvatsara 2069
- Ahankar Mimamsa, Hindi, Hindu Samvatsara 2070
- Ahankar Mimamsa Dwitiya, Hindi, Hindu Samvatsara 2070
- Kapil Geeta Anubhashya, Gujarati, Hindu Samvatsara 2070
- Lagu Granth Sangraha, Hindi, Hindu Samvatsara 2070
- Geeta Sankshep, Gujarati, Hindu Samvatsara 2072
- Sharnagati Vichargosthi, Gujarati
- Ras Drashti ni Tarfenma, Gujarati
- Pushtimargiya Peethadheesh, Gujarati
- Amrit Nu Achman, Gujarati
- Dharm Arth Kaam Moksh ni Pushtimargiya Vivechana, Gujarati
- Bhakti Vardhini Keshod Pravachan Ansh, Gujarati
- Bhaktivardhini Vakhyata, Gujarati
- Chirkut Charcha Samiksha, Hindi
- Dharm Arth Kaam Moksh ki Pushtimargiya Vivechana, Hindi
- Shri Damodardasji – Shri Krushnadas Meghanji – Vaarta Vivechan, Hindi
- Paschimi Darshan Rooprekha, Hindi
- Siddhantvachanavali Gurjar Bhasha Bhavanuvad Sahit, Gujarati
- Amrut Vachanavali, Gujarati

=== Articles ===
- Brahmavaadi Sahishnuta, Hindi
- Vaishnavi Aastha Pratham, Gujarati
- Vaishnavi Aastha Dwitiya, Gujarati
- Multiplex Concepts of Yoga, English

=== Book edits ===
- Avataravadavali
- Pustividhanam
