= Chandra Gupta =

Chandra Gupta may refer to:

- Ishwar Chandra Gupta (1812–1859), Bengali poet and writer
- Chandragupta I (c. 319-335 CE), ruler of the Gupta empire
- Chandragupta II (c. 375-415 CE), ruler of the Gupta empire
- Chandragupta Maurya (c. 340-298 BCE), founder of the Maurya Empire
- Chandra Bhanu Gupta (1902–1980), chief minister of Indian state of Uttar Pradesh

== See also ==
- Chandragupta (disambiguation)
