= Chandragupta =

Chandragupta may refer to:

== People ==
- Chandragupta Maurya, Indian Emperor, Mauryan Empire, 322–297 BCE
- Chandragupta I, Indian king, Gupta Empire, 320-335 CE
- Chandragupta II (died 415), also known as Chandragupta Vikramaditya, Indian emperor, Gupta Empire, 375-415 CE

== Arts and entertainment ==
- Devichandraguptam, ancient Indian drama by Vishakhadatta about Chandragupta II
- Chandragupta Maurya (2011 TV series), a 2011 Indian historical drama
- Chandragupta Maurya (2018 TV series), a 2018 Indian historical drama
- Chandragupta (board game), a board wargame
- Chandragupta (play), 1911 Indian drama by Dwijendralal Ray about Chandragupta Maurya
- Chandragupta (film), a 1934 Indian historical film about Chandragupta Maurya

== See also ==
- Chandra Gupta (disambiguation)
