= Dinesh Chandra Sinha =

- দীনেশচন্দ্র সিংহ
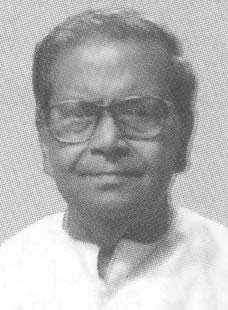
- Dinesh Chandra Sinha
- Born: 1935; Noakhali, Bengal, British India
- Died: 16 June 2014 (aged 78–79); Batanagar, Kolkata, India
- Occupations: Folklorist, historian

Dinesh Chandra Sinha (Bengali: দীনেশচন্দ্র সিংহ) was an Indian scholar, academic, folklorist and historian known for his research on the kavigan of eastern Bengal.

== Early life ==
Sinha was born in 1935, in the village of Sindurkait-Babupur, in the district of Noakhali in undivided Bengal, now in Bangladesh. At the age of eleven he became a victim of the Noakhali genocide when his ancestral house was looted and his family had to flee Noakhali. After the Partition, he migrated to Kolkata.

Family and later life

Sinha was the eldest among 3 brothers and one sister. Due to illness one of his brother and his sister died during their childhood. His father died in 1942 due to illness, when his youngest brother was nearly 9 months of age. After migration they settled in Batanagar. He remained a bachelor in his entire life. His younger brother married and had 2 daughters and a son. In 1989 his mother died. He was diagnosed with cancer in 2006 and underwent a chemotherapy which could only halt the deadly disease temporarily for 7 to 8 years.

Death

In January 2014, his brother had a minor heart attack which gave him a deep shock. Although his brother recovered from that heart attack, he could not overcome the shock. His body began to get affected, and was admitted to a hospital in Baguihati on 24 May, later being shifted to Thakurpukur Cancer Hospital. A day before his death, he was not allowed to drink water directly from a container as the doctors did not take the risk to remove the oxygen mask. Cotton was dipped in water and was placed over his lips. At the dawn of next day, he died.

== Career ==
He joined the university service in the University of Calcutta. While in the service, he pursued his studies and research and obtained his doctoral degree. He was awarded the Sir Asutosh Gold Medal, Sarojini Basu Gold Medal and Griffith Memorial Prize for research work on different topics. He retired as the Deputy Registrar of the University of Calcutta in 1995. He has been the editor of Bengali literary magazine Krishanu since 1968.

== Books ==
- Ashutosh Mukhopadhyayer Shikshachinta
- Noakhalir Mati O Manush
- Kabiyal: Kabigan (1977)
- Purbabanger Kabigan
- Purbabanger Kabiyal Kabisangeet (1990‌)
- Purbabanger Kabigan Samgraha O Paryalochana
- Shyamaprasad: Bangabhanga O Paschimbanga (2000 Tuhina Prakashani)
- 1946 Great Calcutta Killings and Noakhali Genocide (2011 Tuhina Prakashani)
- Nakuleshwar Geetimalya (edited)

== Honours ==
- Sir Asutosh Gold Medal
- Sarojini Basu Gold Medal
- Griffith Memorial Prize
