= Dinesh Chandra (politician) =

Indian politician

Member(elect) of Uttar Pradesh Legislative Council
- In office 7 July 2016 – 6 July 2022
- Preceded by: Virendra Kumar Chauhan, BSP

Personal details
- Party: BSP
- Occupation: Politician

Dinesh Chandra is a leader of the Bahujan Samaj Party in Uttar Pradesh. On 10 June 2016, he was elected to the Uttar Pradesh Legislative Council.
