= Debashish Goswami =

Indian mathematician

- Education: Indian Statistical Institute, Kolkata
- Awards: Shanti Swarup Bhatnagar Prize for Science and Technology
- Scientific career
- Fields: Non commutative geometry, quantum groups, quantum probability.
- Workplaces: Indian Statistical Institute, Kolkata
- Doctoral advisor: Kalyan Bidhan Sinha

Debashish Goswami is an Indian mathematician. He obtained his PhD degree from Indian Statistical Institute under the supervision of Kalyan Bidhan Sinha. He was awarded the Shanti Swarup Bhatnagar Prize for Science and Technology in 2012, the highest science award in India, in the mathematical sciences category.

== Awards and honors ==
- INSA medal for Young Scientists (2004)
- B. M. Birla Science Prize in Mathematics for the year 2006
- Swarnajayanti Fellowship from the Dept. of Science and Technology of Govt. of India in 2009
