= Har Ki Pauri =

Ghat on the Ganges in Haridwar

Coordinates: 29°57′24″N 78°10′15″E

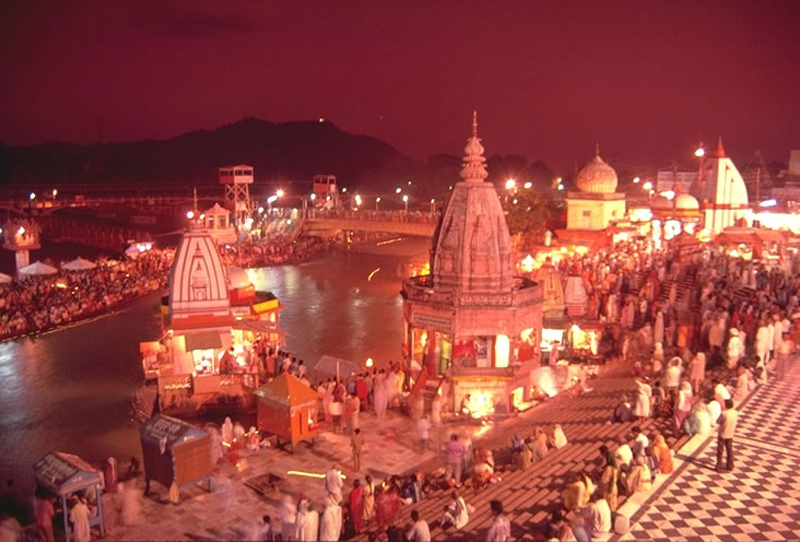
Evening view of Har Ki Pauri, Haridwar

Har Ki Pauri is a sacred ghat on the banks of the Ganges River in the Hindu holy city of Haridwar, in the Indian state of Uttarakhand.

It is believed to be the place where the Ganges leaves the mountains and enters the plains. Vishnu is believed to have visited the Brahmakund in Har Ki Pauri in the Vedic times. The name Har Ki Pauri translates to "the feet of Vishnu" (Hari). Har Ki Pauri is also an important pilgrimage site for religious festivals like the Kumbha Mela, which takes place every twelve years, the Ardh Kumbh Mela, which takes place every six years and the Punjabi festival of Vaisakhi, a harvest festival that occurs every April. The ghat is located on the west bank of Ganga canal through which the Ganga is diverted just to the north.

== Etymology ==
The name Har Ki Pauri translates to "the feet of Vishnu" (Hari). Literally, "Har" means "God" (in reference to Vishnu) and "Pauri" means feet.

== History ==
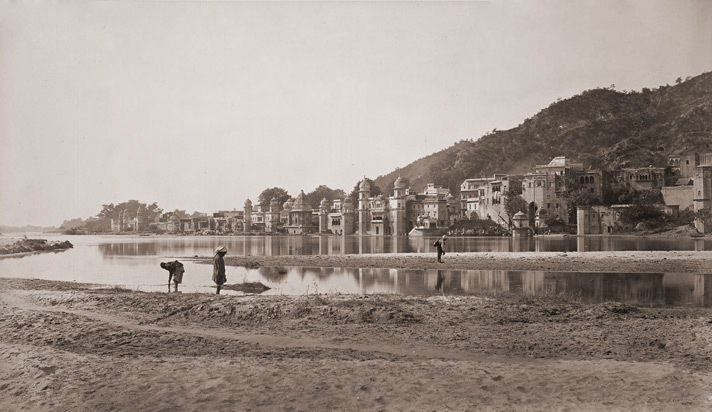
Har Ki Pauri and adjoining areas from opposite bank of the Ganges, 1866.

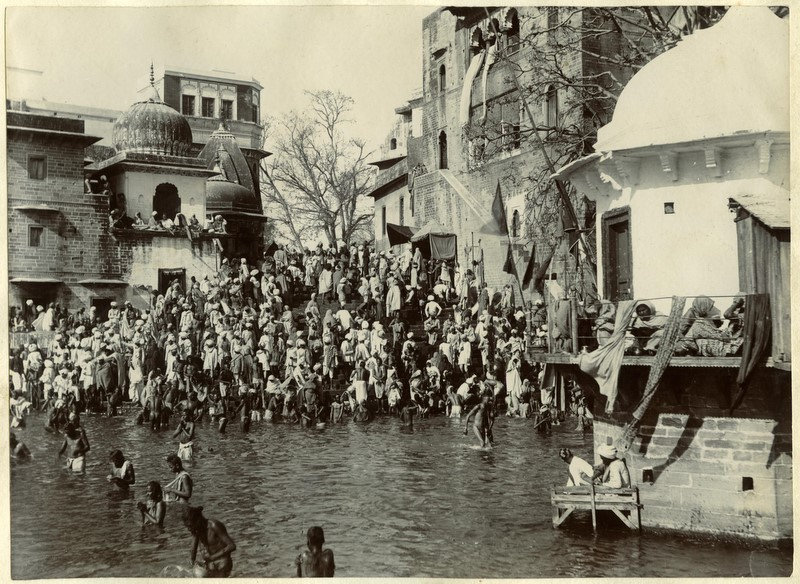
Har Ki Pauri, in 1880s.

King Vikramaditya is said to have built it in 1st century BC in the memory of his brother, Bharthari who had come to meditate here on the bank of the Ganges. An area within Har Ki Pauri, where the evening Ganga Aarti takes places and which is considered most sacred is known as Brahmakund (ब्रह्म कुण्ड). It is considered to be the spot where the drops of Amrit fell over from the sky, while being carried in a pitcher by the celestial bird, Garuda after the Samudra Manthan.

In 1819 the ghat was described as a narrow passage. During the Kumbh mela festival in 1819, 430 people died from crush injuries that resulted from thousands of people pushing to get to the Ganges to bathe. As a result, the ghat was expanded to 100 feet (30 metres) and 60 steps were added by the British government.

The extension of the ghats took place in 1938 (done by Hargyan Singh Katara, a Zamindar from Agra in Uttar Pradesh), and then again in 1986. It's landmark clock tower was erected in 1938.

== Ganga Aarti ==
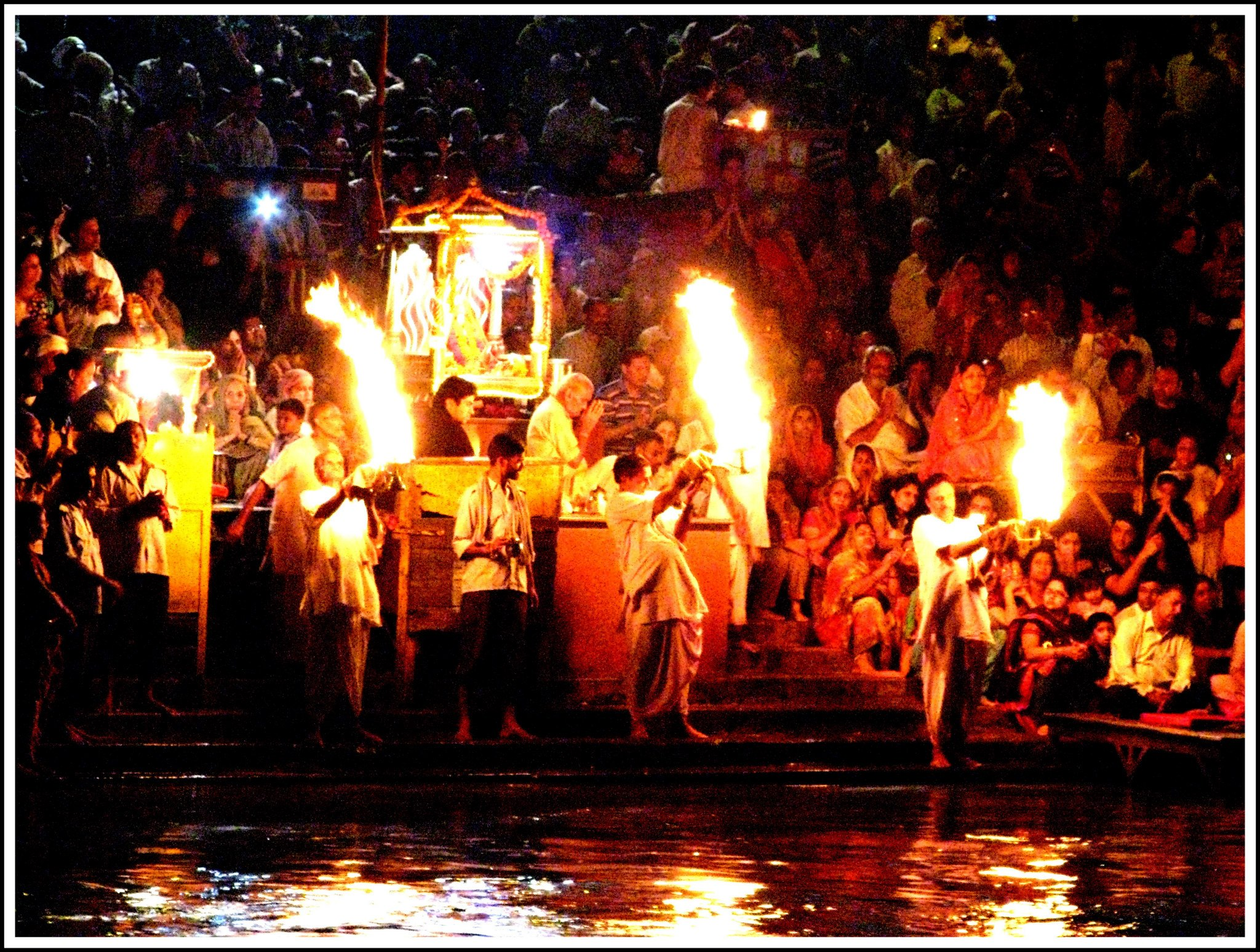
Evening Ganga Aarti at Har Ki Pauri, Haridwar

Each evening at sunset, the priests of Har ki Pauri perform the – Ganga Aarti – over an old tradition. Lights are set on the water to drift downstream. A large number of people gather on both banks of the ganga river to sing Ganga Aarti praises. At that time the priests hold large Fire Bowls in their hands, rungs bells at the temples situated at the ghat and chants are chanted by the priests. People flick Diya (made of leaves and flowers) into the river Ganges as a symbol of hopes and wishes. However, on some special cases, like on the occurrence of eclipses, the time of the Ganga Aarti is be altered accordingly.

== Drying the waters in the Ganga Canal ==
Every year generally on the night of Dussehra the waters in the Ganga Canal in Rishav Haridwar are partially dried to do the job of cleaning the riverbed and undertake the repairing of the ghats. The waters are generally restored on the night of Diwali. But the Ganga Aarti is held every day as usual. It is believed that Maa Ganga visits her paternal house on the day of Dussehra and returns on the day of Bhai Dooj or Bhai Phota.

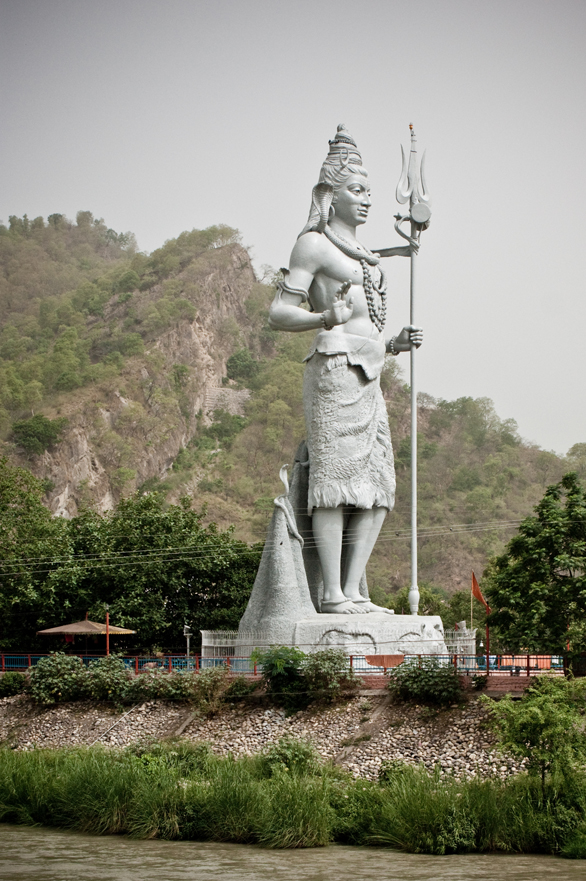
Shiva Statue
