= Srubabati Goswami =

Indian physicist

- Born: 31 March 1966 (age 60)
- Education: Rajabazar Science College (University of Calcutta)

Srubabati Goswami is an Indian scientist specialising in High Energy Physics, Astroparticle Physics, and Neutrino Physics . She is the first Indian woman to earn a Ph.D. in neutrino oscillations from the Science College, University of Calcutta. She did her research in the PRL and Saha Institute of Nuclear Physics and later worked in the Harish Chandra Research Institute. She is a Senior Professor in Theoretical High Energy Physics in the Physical Research Laboratory. She is a fellow of Indian Academy of Sciences, National Academy of Sciences, India and Indian National Science Academy.
