= Jnanendra Prasad Goswamy =

Acharya Jnanendra Prasad Goswamy
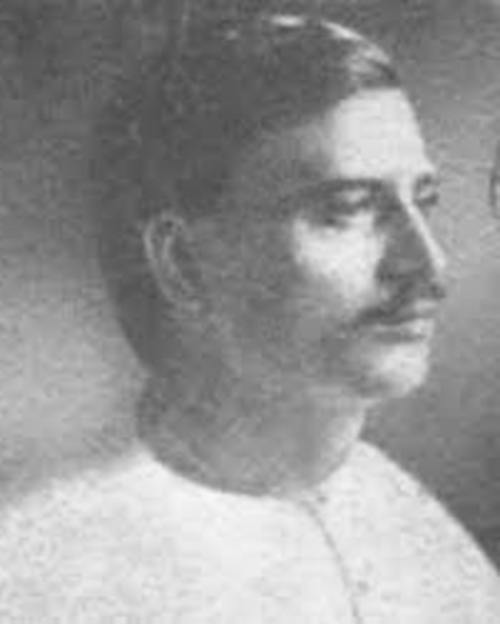
- আচার্য জ্ঞানেন্দ্রপ্রসাদ গোস্বামী

Background information
- Born: 25 December 1902; Bishnupur, Bankura, Bengal Presidency, British India
- Died: 29 October 1945 (aged 42) Bishnupur, Bankura, Bengal Presidency, British India
- Occupation: Singer

Acharya Jnanendra Prasad Goswamy (Bengali: আচার্য জ্ঞানেন্দ্রপ্রসাদ গোস্বামী; 25 December 1902 – 29 October 1945) a.k.a. Jnan Gossain (Bengali: জ্ঞান গোসাই), from Bengal, was an Indian vocalist in the Hindustani classical music tradition.

A renowned exponent of the Bishnupur gharana, he was known for the Khayal, Dhrupad, Thumri and Tappa, along with Raga-pradhan songs.

== Early life ==
Jnanendra's journey to the world of Indian classical music was initiated at his home under the guidance of his father Bipin Chandra Goswamy, who was a noted esraj player. His next guru was his uncle, Pandit Radhika Prasad Goswamy, a great vocalist of his times. He also got his training form eminent vocalists such as Pandit Girija Shankar Chakrabarty and Ustad Faiyaz Khan.

== Professional career ==
Jnanendra Prasad was instrumental in popularizing Indian Classical music and created an audience of its own. In Bishnupur gharana, Dhrupad is the main form of music which is addressed to God, and in ancient times used to be sung in temples and king's chambers. He was a close friend of Kazi Nazrul Islam, and recorded many Nazrul Geeti in Bengali. He was associated with Gramaphone Company of India for many years.
