= Faiyaz Khan =

Indian classical vocalist

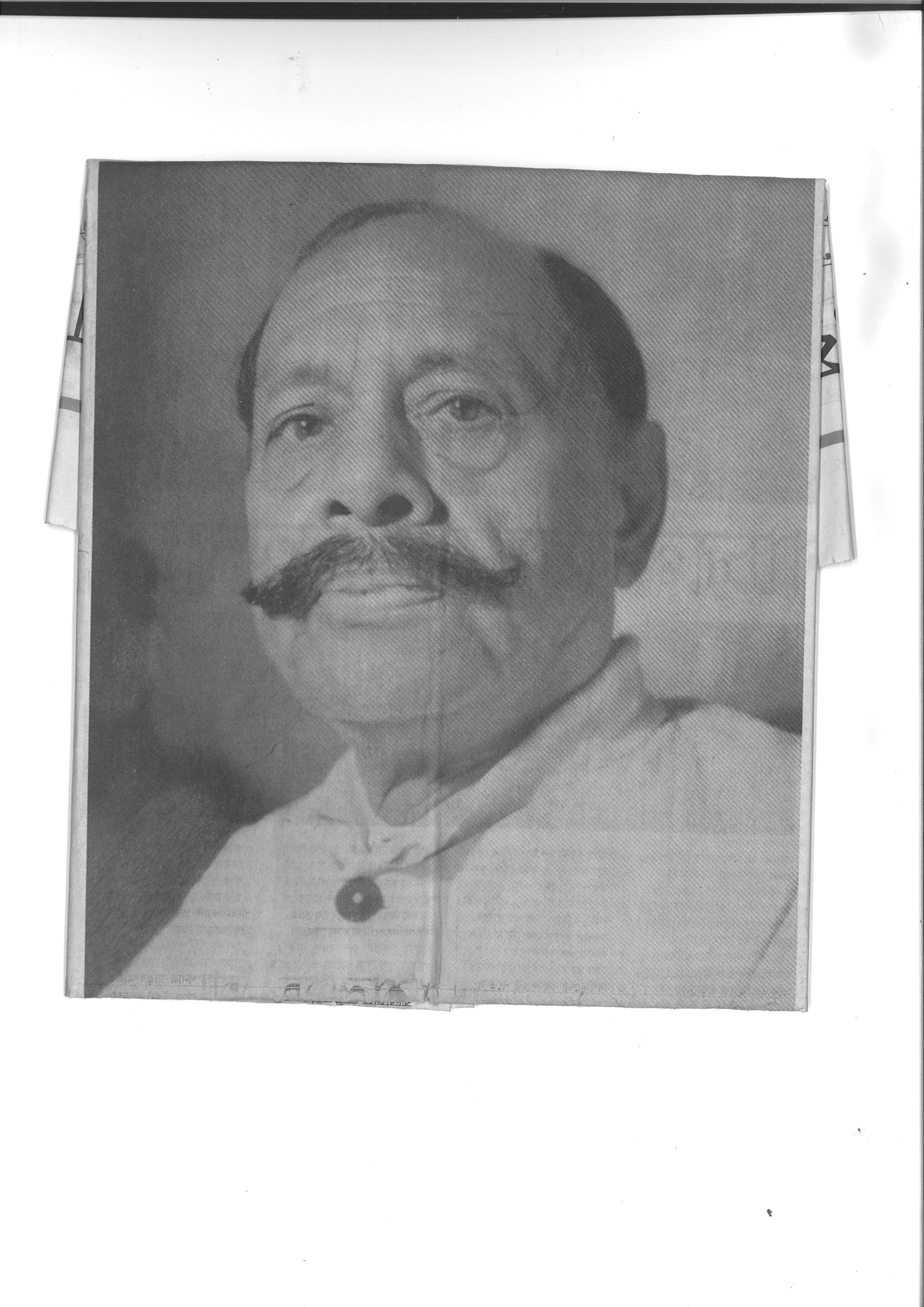
- Born: 8 February 1886; Sikandara near Agra, Uttar Pradesh, British India
- Died: 5 November 1950 (aged 69–70); Baroda, Gujarat, India
- Other name: Aftab-e-Mausiqi (the Sun of Music)
- Occupation: Vocalist
- Years active: 1924 – 1950
- Spouse(s): His wife died soon after their marriage. He never remarried and died childless.

Ustad Faiyaz Khan (8 February 1886 – 5 November 1950) was an Indian classical vocalist, an exponent of the Agra gharana of Hindustani classical music. He was popularly known as "Aftab-E-Mausiqi," meaning the Sun or sunshine of music. He was one of the most influential and respected Indian classical vocalists of the 20th century.

== Early life ==
Born at Sikandara in the North-Western Provinces on 8 February 1886, he was the son of Safdar Hussain, who died four months before his birth. He was brought up by his maternal grandfather, Ghulam Abbas (1825-1934), who taught him music up to the age of 25. He was also a student of Ustad Mehboob Khan "Daraspiya", his father-in-law, Natthan Khan and his uncle Fida Hussain Khan. Through these musicians, his familial lineage traces back to Alakhdas, Malukdas and then to Haji Sujan Khan.

== Singing career ==
He was remembered as Mehfil Ka Badshah by those who lived during his time and went to his live concerts. Considered a neo-classicist by some scholars of Indian classical music, Faiyaz Khan served for a long time as the court musician of Sayajirao Gaekwad III, the Maharaja of Baroda, where he was awarded the "Gyan Ratna" (Gem of Knowledge). The Maharaja of Mysore awarded him the title "Aftaab-e-Mausiqi" (the Sun of Music) in 1908. Faiyaz Khan's specialities were dhrupad and khyal, but he was also capable of singing thumri and ghazal. According to the musicologist Ashok Ranade, "There was no chink in his armour". He was described as having blended the styles of his teachers, thereby giving the Agra gayaki a new direction, and as having set new trends in classical music.

Faiyaz Khan also composed several bandishes using the pen-name 'Prem Piya'. His most popular thumri was Baaju band khul khul jaye.

"He was a frequent performer in the musical conferences and circles of Lucknow, Allahabad, Calcutta, Gwalior, Bombay and Mysore and in concerts organized by provincial princes." These princes often vied with one another to have the Ustad perform in their respective courts. The rulers of Baroda held him in high esteem and he was offered the seat to the right of the Maharaja of Baroda during the official functions of the royal court in 1912.

He also performed at Jorasanko Thakurbari, the residential abode of Rabindranath Tagore (1861-1941), who was an admirer of the Ustad. It is known that he had held a musical session at Jorasanko a few years before the passing away of Tagore. Other well-known admirers include tabla maestros such as Ahmed Jan Thirakwa, Amir Khan, Ali Akbar Khan, Vilayat Khan and Ravi Shankar. Faiyaz Khan was a dignified performer, who often wore a silk sherwani with rows of medals awarded to him in public. Then later, he would perform flanked by sarangi and tabla players during his live concerts.

Affected by a bout of typhoid in 1945 followed by tuberculosis restricted Faiyaz Khan to lower his pitch to B and B Flat, though in his prime, he always sang in C Sharp and C. The available recordings of the Ustad are almost entirely from his later years."

== Death and legacy ==
Ustad Faiyaz Khan died of tuberculosis on 5 November 1950 at Baroda, Gujarat in India. Faiyaz Khan's tomb, situated in Vadodara, Gujarat was attacked during the 2002 Gujarat riots. Extensive damage was inflicted on the structure.

Some of Faiyaz Khan's best-known students were Dipali Nag, K. L. Saigal Dilip Chand Bedi, Sohan Singh, Asad Ali Khan (later migrated to Pakistan), Dhruvatara Joshi, Shrikrishna Ratanjankar and Jnanendra Prasad Goswamy, apart from in-house disciples such as Khadim Hussain Khan, Vilayat Hussain Khan, Latafat Hussain Khan, Ata Hussain Khan and Sharafat Hussain Khan. Faiyaz Khan himself was an admirer of Abdul Karim Khan of Kirana gharana. S. N. Ratanjankar was perhaps the last of his pupils who excelled both as a teacher and as a performer.

== Discography ==
Release No.	Raga
N 36050 (His Master's Voice)	Ramkali (Alap & Khayal)
H 1331 (Hindusthan Records)	Purvi & Chhaya
HH 1 (Hindusthan Records)	Puriya & Jaijaivanti
H 793 (Hindusthan Records)	Jaunpuri & Kafi

- 78 rpm side A Lalat Aalaap, side B 'drut' – tadapata hoon jaise jale bin meene (Hindusthan Records)
- Thumri Bhairavi Baazuband khul khul jaaey, his most popular thumri
