= Vadavali =

Village in Maharashtra

- village
- Location in Maharashtra, India Vadavali (India)
- Coordinates: 19.3417423°N 72.832042°E
- Country: India
- State: Maharashtra
- District: Palghar
- Taluka: Talasari
- Elevation: 9 m (30 ft)

Population (2011)
  - Total: 5,891
- Time zone: UTC+5:30 (IST)
- 2011 census code: 551570

Vadavali is a village in the Palghar district of Maharashtra, India. It is located in the Talasari taluka.

== Demographics ==
According to the 2011 census of India, Vadavali has 1067 households. The effective literacy rate (i.e. the literacy rate of population excluding children aged 6 and below) is 56.35%.

Demographics (2011 Census)
	Total	Male	Female
Population	5891	2783	3108
Children aged below 6 years	1105	533	572
Scheduled caste	21	12	9
Scheduled tribe	5354	2535	2819
Literates	2697	1562	1135
Workers (all)	2437	1254	1183
Main workers (total)	1222	718	504
Main workers: Cultivators	767	422	345
Main workers: Agricultural labourers	203	121	82
Main workers: Household industry workers	3	0	3
Main workers: Other	249	175	74
Marginal workers (total)	1215	536	679
Marginal workers: Cultivators	175	56	119
Marginal workers: Agricultural labourers	621	223	398
Marginal workers: Household industry workers	17	10	7
Marginal workers: Others	402	247	155
Non-workers	3454	1529	1925
