= Dinesh Chandra Goswami =

Assamese writer

Dr. Dinesh Chandra Goswami
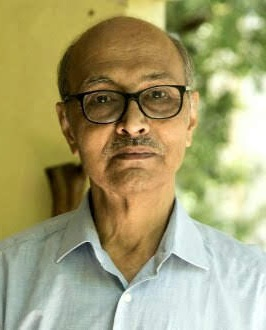
- Born: 1949 (age 76–77)
- Citizenship: Indian
- Known for: Scientist, Author
- Notable work: Asha aru Akangshar Kusum Butali (Gathering the threads of hopes and aspirations), Baijnanik Mon Baijnanik Sinta (Scientific mind, scientific thoughts), Dinesh Chandra Goswamir Swanirvasita Galpa (Self-selected SF short stories)
- Spouse: Rupasree Goswami
- Awards: Three Asom Sahitya Sabha Awards (Gopal Chandra Goswami Award-1968, Gopal Chandra Goswami Award-1972 Premdhar Dutta Award-1980) National Award for Best S&T coverage in mass media by National Council for Science and Technology Communication (NCSTC), honoured by the President of India for contribution to children's literature – 2007, Lifetime achievement award from the Publication Board, Assam - 2016 and D.Sc. (Honoris Causa) degree by the Mahapurusha Srimanta Sankaradeva Viswavidyalaya. Nagaon, 2026.

Dr. Dinesh Chandra Goswami is an Assamese writer and winner of the Sahitya Akademi's Bal Sahitya Puraskar for 2014.

== Early life ==
Dinesh Chandra Goswami was born at Ulubari Sattra village of Nalbari district of Assam in 1949. He did MSc and PhD degrees from Gauhati University. He started his career, in 1970, as lecturer in physics at B. Borooah College and then joined Cotton College, Guwahati. He later worked in the CSIR Publications and Information Directorate and the CSIR Headquarters at New Delhi and then in various levels as a scientist at the Regional Research Laboratory, Jorhat. He retired in 2009 as the Adviser to the Director. Besides Assamese he knows English and Hindi.

== Career as a writer ==
He started writing in the children's corners of newspapers at the age of 11. His first book (Abhinava Abiskar) was published in 1975. He has published about seven novels, eight short story collections, one children's drama, 53 popular science books, and various text books and guide books. Some of his significant works include novels such as 'Jonakir Jilikani', 'Atmajivanir Prayas', 'Sabda Nirontor Sabda', 'Divya Upaban', 'Atmajibonir Dwitiy Prayas', 'Tritonor Abhiyan' (drama), 'Abhinna Hriday' (short stories), 'Kalpajagat'(short stories), 'Antarvahi' (short stories), 'Mantur Parivesh' (children's novel), and 'Asha aru Akangshar Kusum Butali' (Gathering the threads of hopes and aspirations—an autobiography). A collection of his self-selected science fiction short stories in Assamese has been published by the National Book Trust, India, and its English version (The Hair Timer) has also been published by them. More than 40 of his science fiction dramas and more than 100 of his science features, besides a large number of his talks and discussions, have been broadcast by AIR. He has been regularly publishing popular science and social columns in newspapers and magazines. He was the chief editor of the Assamese Encyclopaedia (three volumes on science) and an Assamese language dictionary the 'Saraighat Abhidhan', and various other science dictionaries and popular science volumes. He is also the editor of a series of 125 world famous classics translated into Assamese, besides many other compilations and magazines.

== Awards ==
He has won several awards including:

- Three Asom Sahitya Sabha Awards (Gopal Chandra Goswami Awards—1968 and 1972; and Premadhar Datta Award—1980)
- National Prize for Children's Literature—1980
- NBT Prize for children's literature—1992
- National Award for Best S&T coverage in mass media by National Council for Science and Technology Communication (NCSTC)-- 1997
- Honoured by the President of India for contribution to children's literature—2007
- Publication Board Assam, Award—2012
- Bisan Lal Agarwal Environment Award—2013
- Sahitya Akademi Bal Sahitya Puraskar—2014
- Lifetime achievement award from the Publication Board, Assam—2016.
- Parivesh Mitra Award from the Govt of Assam, 2022
- Golaghat Jatiya Bidyalay Award, 2023
- Anyayug Lifelong Achievements Award 2024
- Tirtha Nath Sarma Memorial Excellence Award, 2025, from Pragjyotish College, Guwahati
- Ramanujan Teacher award. 2025
- DSc. (Honoris Causa) degree from the Mahapurusha Srimanta Sankaradeva Viswavidyalaya, Nagaon.

== Honours ==
Dr. Goswami was the President of the Assam Science Society and the Founder President of the Assam Science Writers' Association. He is associated with many other social and scientific organizations.
