= Mudra (music) =

Term woven into compositions in Indian classical music

In Indian classical music, particularly Carnatic music, a mudra (IAST: Mudrā; Sanskrit for sign or symbol) is a term woven into compositions that indicates the identity of the composer, a patron, the raga, tala, or style. A composer might use his own name or a pseudonym. Not all composers have mudras, and they do not necessarily relate to the composer's name.

== List of mudras ==
=== Hindustani musicians ===
Mudra (English)	Mudra (Devanagari)	Musician	Translation	Gharana	Details
Adā-ranga	अदारंग	Firoz Khān of Delhi	"Colors of Grace."	Seniya Qawwal Bacche || 18th-century dhrupadiya in Rangile's Court.	
Ashiq-rang	आशिक रंग	Mir Saleh	"Colors of Lover	Qawwal Bacche	
Achpal	अच्पल	Sheikh Ajmal Khan Sahab		Qawwal Bacche	Bahadur Shah Zafar Teacher
Abhī-raṅga	अभीरंग	Abhijith Shenoy Kerki	"Colors of fearlessness."	Gwalior, Agra, Atrauli	
Ālama	आलम	Ālamara Begum Khāsmahal			
Ahmeda-piyā	अहमदपिया	Alladiya Khan	"Lover of Ahmed."	Jaipur-Atrauli	
Akhtara-piyā	अख़्तरपिया	Wajid Ali Shah			
Amara, Amara-piyā	अमर, अमरपिया	Aman Ali Khan		Bhendi-Bazaar	
Amaradāsa, Amara-piyā	अमरदास, अमरपिया	Navrang Nagpurkar		Bhendi-Bazaar	
Ānanda	आनन्द	Pralhad Ganu		Agra, Atrauli	
Ananga-raṅga	अनंगरंग	Acharya Brihaspati			
Azīza-piyā	अज़ीजपिया	Mehboob Baksh Khan		Agra	
Bhāva-raṅga	भावरंग	Balwantrai Bhatt		Gwalior	
Bindā	बिन्दा	Bindadin Maharaj		Lucknow	
Chakra-piyā	चक्रपिया	Chakradhar Singh			
Chānda-piyā	चान्दपिया	Chand Khan		Delhi	
Chatura, Chatura Pandit	चतुर, चतुरपण्डित	Vishnu Narayan Bhatkhande		Rampur	
Chita-Ānanda	चित-आनन्द	Chidanand Nagarkar	"Elated consciousness."	Agra	
Darasa-piyā	दरसपिया	Mehboob Khān of Agra		Agra	
Darasa-piyā	दरसपिया	Shafi Ahmed Khān of Atrauli		Atrauli	
Darpaṇa	दर्पण	Yunus Hussain Khan	"Mirror."	Agra, Atrauli	
Deva-raṅga	देवरंग	Daibashish Gangopadhyay	"Divine Colors."		Musician, Composer, Music director
Dhyāna-raṅga-piyā	ध्यानरंगपिया	Mani Prasad		Kirana	
Dila-raṅga	दिलरंग	Azmat Hussain Khan	"Colors of the Heart."	Khurja, Atrauli	
Dina-raṅga	दिनरंग	Dinkar Kaikini	"Colors of the Day."	Agra, Atrauli	
Gaan-guni	गान-गुणी	B.Krishna Bhat		Gwalior	
Gauhara, Gauharapyari	गौहर, गौहरप्यारी	Gauhar Jaan			
Guṇa-piyā	गुणपिया	Chhota Gandharva	"Lover of Qualities."		
Guṇa-raṅga	गुणरंग	Fayyaz Ahmad Khan	"Colors of Qualities."	Kirana	
Guṇi-dāsa	गुणीदास	Jagganathbuwa Purohit	"Servant of Qualities."	Agra, Atrauli	
Guṇi-jāna	गुणीजान	CR Vyas		Gwalior, Agra, Atrauli	
Guṇiye	गुणिये	Vasantrao Kulkarni		Gwalior, Agra, Atrauli	
Guru-raṅga	गुरुरंग	Vrajotsavji Maharaj]			
Gyāna-raṅga	ज्ञानरंग	Aarshin Karande		Mewati	
Govinda	गोविंद	Govindrao Dantale		Mewati	
Hara-raṅga	हररंग	Muhammad Ali Khan			
Hara-raṅga	हररंग	Vishnu Narayan Bhatkhande		Rampur	Musicologist.
Hari-priyā	हरिप्रिया	Harishchandra Bali		Agra, Atrauli	
Hinga-raṅga	हिंगरंग	Hussain Ali Khan	"Colors of Hinga."	Kirana	
Ināyata, Ināyata-piyā	इनायत, इनायतपिया	Inayat Hussain Khan	"Lover of Inayat."	Rampur-Sahaswan	
Ibrāhīm-piyā	इब्राहीमपिया	Ibrahim Khan of Tonk		Rampur-Sahaswan	
Jasa	जस	Pandit Jasraj	"Glory."	Mewati	
Jyōti-raṅga	ज्योतिरंग	Rajaram Shukla			
Khush-rang	खुशरंग	Ustad Muzaffar Khan		Sikanderabad Delhi Gharana	
Khusha-raṅga	ख़ुशरंग	Aslam Hussain Khan		Hapur, Khurja	
Kharaharapriya-dāsa	खरहरप्रियादास	Bholanath Bhatt		Benares	
Krishṇa-dāsa	कृष्णदास	Master Krishnarao		Gwalior, Agra, Jaipur-Atrauli, Kirana	
Lalana-piyā	ललनपिया	Nandalal Sharma			
Lāla-raṅga	लालरंग	Chaman Lal Varma			
Madhura-piyā	मधुरपिया	Gokulotsavji Maharaj			
Magana	मगन	Chinmoy Lahiri		Agra, Atrauli	
Magana-piyā	मगनपिया	Mashiyat Khan		Agra	
Manahara	मनहर	Murli Manohar Shukla			
Manahara-piyā	मनहरपिया	Abdullah Khan		Agra, Atrauli	
Manahara-piyā	मनहरपिया	Prem Prakash Johri			
Mana-raṅga	मनरंग	Bhupat Khan		Seniya	
Mana-rang	मनरंग	Maste Khan Sheikh Mazhar		Qawwal Bacche Sikandrabad	
Mana-raṅga	मनरंग	Mahawat Khan of Jaipur			
Manapiya	मनपिया	Pamalka Karunanayake of Sri Lanka			
Mita-raṅga	मितरंग	Deviprasad Kharwandikar	"Colors of Measure."		
Mohana-piyā	मोहनपिया	Aqeel Ahmed Khan		Agra	
Nāda-piyā	नादपिया	V R Athavale	"Lover of naad."	Gwalior, Agra	
Nāda-raṅga	नादरंग	Dilip Chandra Vedi	"Colors of naad."	Patiala, Agra, Atrauli	
Nāda-raṅga	नादरंग	Sandeep Ranade	"Colors of naad."	Mewati	
Nātha-piyā	नाथपिया	Vilayat Khan		Etawah	Sitarist. Enayet Khan's Rajput name was "Nath Singh."
Niguṇa	निगुण	Neelkanth Abhyankar		Agra, Atrauli	
Prāṇa-piyā	प्राणपिया	Vilayat Hussain Khan		Agra, Atrauli	
Pranava-raṅga	प्रणवरंग	Omkarnath Thakur	"Colors of Om."	Gwalior	
Prema-piyā	प्रेमपिया	Faiyaz Khan	"Lover of Affect."	Agra	
Prema-dāsa	प्रेमदास	Latafat Hussain Khan	"Servant of Affect."	Agra, Atrauli	
Prema-raṅga	प्रेमरंग	Sharafat Hussain Khan	"Colors of Affect."	Agra, Atrauli	
Prema-raṅga	प्रेमरंग	Ratnakar Ramnathkar	"Colors of Affect."	Agra, Atrauli	
Qadara-piyā	क़दरपिया	Mirza Bala Qadar of Rampur		Thumri composer.	
Ratana-piyā	रतनपिया	Ata Hussain Khan		Agra	
Rāma-dāsa	रामदास	Zahoor Khan		Khurja	
Rāma-raṅga	रामरंग	Ramashreya Jha			
Raṅgile	रंगीले	Ramzan Khan		Rangile Sikandrabad Rangeela Gharana	
Rasa-dāsa	रसदास	Arun Kashalkar		Gwalior, Agra, Atrauli, Jaipur-Atrauli	
Rasa-dāsī	रसदासी	Veen Vishwaroop		Agra, Atrauli	
Rasa-piyā	रसपिया	Babanrao Haldankar		Agra, Atrauli, Jaipur-Atrauli	
Rasa-raṅga	रसरंग	Bade Inayat Hussain Khan		Gwalior	
Rasa-raṅga	रसरंग	Anwar Hussain Khan		Agra, Atrauli	
Rasika-piyā	रसिकपिया	Dhruv Tara Joshi			
Rasika-raṅga	रसिकरंग	Ashok Ranade		Gwalior	Musicologist
Rasika-raṅga	रसिकरंग	Deepak Chatterjee			
Razā-piyā	रज़ापिया	Raza Ali Khan		Patiala	Nawab.
Saba-raṅga	सबरंग	Ghulam Abbas Khan		Agra	
Saba-raṅga	सबरंग	Bade Ghulam Ali Khan		Patiala	
Saba-rasa	सबरस	Ghulam Maulvi Khan		Patiala	
Shok-rang	शोक रंग	Bahadur Shah Zafar			Last Mughal Emperor
Sadā-raṅga	सदारंग	Niyamat Khān of Delhi		Seniya Qawwal Bacche || Descendant of Tansen, dhrupadiya in Rangile's Court.	
Saguṇa-piyā	सगुणपिया	Yashpal		Agra, Atrauli	
Sajana-piyā	सजनपिया	Khadim Hussain Khan		Agra, Atrauli	
Samajh-Dil	समझदिल	Ustad Nazeer Ahmed Khan		Qawwal Bacche, Delhi Gharana	Nizam's Court Singer
Samajha-dila	समझदिल	Enayat Khan		Etawah, Agra	
Sanada-piyā	सनदपिया	Tawakkul Husain Khan of Rampur		Jaipur	Thumri composer.
Sanehī-piyā	सनेहीपिया	Gulam Qadar Khan		Agra	
Sarasa-piyā	सरसपिया	Kale Khan		Agra	
Sarasa-raṅga	सरसरंग	Qayam Khan		Agra	
Shakīla-piyā	शकीलपिया	Nanhe Khan		Agra	
Shōk, Shōka-raṅga	शोक, शोकरंग	Kumar Gandharva		Gwalior	
Shōri, Shōri Miyān	शोरी, शोरी मियाँ	Miyan Ghulam Nabi Shori		Lucknow	
Shubha-raṅga	शुभरंग	Shubhada Paradkar			
Shyāma-raṅga	श्यामरंग	Dayam Khan		Agra	
Shyāma-raṅga	श्यामरंग	Jitendra Abhisheki		Atrauli, Khurja	
Subha-raṅga	सुभरंग	Shankarlal Mishra			
Sughara-piyā	सुघरपिया	Bhaiya Ganpatrao		Gwalior	
Sujana-dāsa	सुजनदास	Yashwant Mahale		Agra, Atrauli	
Sujanasuta	सुजनसुत	K. G. Ginde		Agra, Atrauli	
Sujāna	सुजान	Haji Sujan Khan		Agra	
Sujāna, Sujāna-piyā	सुजान, सुजानपिया	S. N. Ratanjankar		Agra, Atrauli	
Sura-raṅga	सुररंग	Amir Khan		Indore, Kirana, Bhendi-Bazaar	
Taan-Ras	तनरास	Ustad Taanras Khan		Qawwal Bacche Delhi Gharana	Founder Of Delhi Gharana Last Mughal Singer
Tana-raṅga	तनरंग	Vishwanath Rao Ringe		Gwalior	
Vyākul	व्याकुल	Vyakul of Ayodhya			Guru of Ramashreya Jha
Vedī	वेदी	Dilip Chandra Vedi	"Colors of naad."	Patiala, Agra, Atrauli	
Vinōda-piyā	विनोदपिया	Tasadduq Hussain Khan		Agra	Son of Kallan Khan, Agra Gharana.
Vraja-raṅga	व्रजरंग	Vrajotsavji Maharaj			
Yasha-raṅga	यशरंग	Yeshwantbua Joshi		Gwalior, Agra, Atrauli	

=== Carnatic musicians ===
Name	Mudra	Notes
Tallapaka Annamayya	Venkata	
Vyasatirtha	Sri Krishna/ Siri Krishna/Krishna	
Vadiraja Tirtha	Hayavadana	
Sripadaraja	Ranga Vitthala	
Jagannatha Dasa	Jagannatha Vitthala	
Gopala Dasa	Gopala Vithala	
Vijaya Dasa	Vijaya Vithala	
Purandara Dasa	Purandara Vitthala	
Kanaka Dasa	Adi Keshava	
Tyagaraja	Tyagaraja	
Shyama Shastri	Shyama Krishna	
Muthuswami Dikshitar	Guruguha	Guha is one of the many names of Murugan, the deity at Tiruttani, the site of his first composition.
Swati Tirunal	Padmanabha; Padumanabha; Pankajanabha; Sarasijanabha; Sarasanabha; Ambhojanabha; Ambujanabha; Sarojanabha; Kamalanabha; Neerajanabha; Jalajanabha; Sarasiruhanabha	
Bhadrachala Ramadas	Ramadasu	
Papanasam Sivan	Ramadasan	
Gopalakrishna Bharathi	Balakrishnan, Gopalakrishnan	
Harikesanallur Muthiah Bhagavatar	Harikesha	
Narayana Teertha	Narayana Teertha	
Patnam Subramania Iyer	Venkateshwara, Venkatesha	
Mysore Vasudevacharya	Vasudevā	
Mysore V. Ramarathnam	Rāma	
M. D. Ramanathan	Varada Dasa	
M. Balamuralikrishna	Hari; Murali	
Maharajapuram Santhanam	Maharajan	
Koteeswara Iyer	Kavi Kunjara Dasa	
Kshetrayya	Muvva Gopala	
Sadashiva Brahmendra swami	Paramahamsa	
T. G. Krishna Iyer (Lalitha Dasa)	Lalitha	
Jayachamarajendra Wadiyar	Sri Vidya	
