= Azmat Hussain Khan =

Ustad Azmat Hussain Khan
- Born: March 5, 1911 (age 115); Atrauli, Uttar Pradesh, India
- Died: July 26, 1975 (aged 64) Mumbai, Maharashtra, India
- Genre: Hindustani classical music
- Occupations: Vocalist, teacher, composer

Ustad Azmat Hussain Khan (5 March 1911 - 26 July 1975) was an Indian classical vocalist, composer, and music teacher, belonging to the Khurja, Jaipur-Atrauli, and Agra gharanas. He was known for his performances of khyal, dhrupad, dhamar, tappa, tarana, tirwat, dadra, and thumri. He composed bandishes and ghazals under the pen names "Dilrang" and "Maykash." He created new ragas such as Dutia (or Devta) Bhairav.

== Life and career ==
Azmat Hussain Khan was born in Atrauli to Ustad Khairat Ali Khan and Amrunissa Begum, respectively of the Atrauli and Khurja lineages of professional musicians. He received musical training from his maternal uncle Ustad Haji Altaf Hussain Khan, son of Ustad Zahur Khan, and accompanied him in concerts in eastern India and Nepal. His first major solo performance was in Bombay in 1927, after which he moved to that city. There, he continued his training under his brother-in-law, Ustad Vilayat Hussain Khan, and his paternal uncle, Ustad Alladiya Khan. In 1935, he performed at the court of Maharaja Sayajirao Gaekwad III in Baroda. In 1948, at the invitation of Jawaharlal Nehru, he performed as part of a celebration of the anniversary of Indian independence. In 1954, he performed at the court of King Mohammad Zahir Shah of Afghanistan. In the 1950s, Arvind Parikh listed him among the musicians who performed at B. R. Deodhar's annual concert for the death anniversary of V. D. Paluskar. He was also employed by All India Radio as a producer and advisor. In 1973, he received a formal felicitation from Governor of Maharashtra Nawab Ali Yavar Jung Bahadur, and in 1975 he died of cardiac arrest. In 1987, a street was named after him in South Mumbai. According to noted musicologist and critic Mohan Nadkarni, Azmat Hussain Khan, "in the prime of his career, was one of the most popular vocalists of his generation."

Outside of music, Azmat Hussain Khan studied Urdu poetry with Seemab Akbarabadi from the age of 25.

== Musical style and influences ==
The style of Haji Altaf Hussain Khan, Azmat Hussain Khan's first teacher, emphasized "the natural opennes of akara during the executions of tans, avoidance of sudden changes in their structural design, and a relatively infrequent employment of boltans." He was later trained in "laykari and boltan" by Vilayat Hussain Khan, and in "achop ragas[,] phirath and the unexpected arrival at the sam" by Ustad Alladiya Khan. His performances were noted for "rare Ragas, complex Laykari, Taan-s with perfection, and diversity of compositions."

== Legacy ==
Azmat Hussain Khan trained students both within and outside his family network. Non-family students include Pandit Jitendra Abhisheki, Smt. Hansa Wadkar, Smt. Durgabai Shirodkar, Shri T. L. Raju, Shri Datta Kerkar, Manik Varma, and Nalini Barodkar. Students within the khandan include Ustad Yunus Hussain Khan, Ustad Yaqub Hussain Khan, Ustad Shafi Ahmed Khan, Ustad Aslam Khan, and Ustad Vajahat Hussain Khan. The latter two, Azmat Hussain Khan's brother-in-law and son respectively, founded the Dilrang Academy of Music and Fine Arts in 1995, partially in order to "highlight the contributions made by Ustad Azmat Hussain Khan." Another of Azmat Hussain Khan's sons, Rafat Hussain Khan, is a sitar-player.
