= Ratnakant Ramnathkar =

Indian musician (1908–1982)

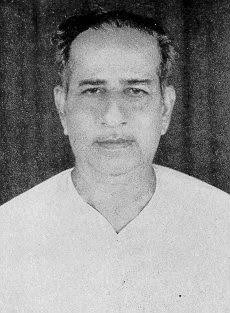

Background information
- Also known as: Ramnathkarbuva, Premarang
- Born: 3 June 1908; Ramnathi, Goa, Portuguese India
- Died: 28 July 1982 (aged 74) Goa, India
- Instruments: Harmonium, sitar, sarangi, jal tarang, tanpura
- Father: Raghuveer Ramnathkar

Ratnakant Ramnathkar (3 June 1908 – 28 July 1982), also referred to as Ramnathkarbuva and Premarang, was an Indian classical musician, harmonium player, vocalist, and music instructor born in Ramnathi, Goa. He worked as an artist with All India Radio in Bombay and later served as a music teacher at the Kala Academy in Goa.

== Early life and training ==
Ramnathkar was born on 3 June 1908 in Ramnathi, Goa, to Raghuveer Ramnathkar, from whom he received his initial musical training. He spent the first 14 years of his childhood in Ramnathi before moving to Bombay in 1918, where his formal instruction in classical music began.

After receiving early lessons in vocal and instrumental music from his father, Ramnathkar quickly mastered playing the harmonium, earning a local reputation summarized by the phrase "the son is better than the father". His reputation as a harmonium player eventually extended beyond Bombay. He furthered his musical education under masters including Vilayat Hussain Khan, Nannhe Khan, Faiyaz Khan, Nisar Hussain Khan, Khadim Hussain Khan, and Vaje Buwa. He studied under the Agra gharana.

== Musical career ==
Ramnathkar served as a harmonium player at the Bombay station of All India Radio (Akashvani), where he provided musical accompaniment to numerous prominent artists during his tenure. Following his retirement, Akashvani retained him as a staff vocalist. He compiled and composed various ragas, original compositions (cheejas), and taranas, which were broadcast on Akashvani.

In addition to the harmonium, Ramnathkar was proficient in playing the sitar, sarangi, and jal tarang, and was noted for his skill in tuning the tanpura.

== Teaching ==
Ramnathkar taught classical music to a number of students, including Jitendra Abhisheki, Kagalkarbuwa, Jagannathbuwa Purohit, Meenakshi Mudbidri, Gangubai Hangal, and Saraswati Rane, among others.

== Legacy ==
At the age of 65, he joined the Kala Academy in Goa as a music instructor. He also authored a book on musicology. In his memory, his disciples organize an annual music festival in Goa. Kala Academy published a book on his work, Premarang.

== Death ==
Ramnathkar died in Goa on 28 July 1982.
