= Khurja Gharana =

The Khurja Gharana is a musical apprenticeship tribe of Hindustani classical music. Known for being Azmat Hussain Khan's and Jitendra Abhisheki's musical lineage, the gharana emerged from a family of Nauharbani musicians and gained recognition during the life of Altaf Hussain Khan who was born at Khurja.

With its own distinct aesthetics, stylings, practices, and repertoire, the gharana melded with Jaipur-Atrauli, Agra, Qawwal Bacchon, Atrauli, and Hapur musical traditions.

== History ==
Ustad Altaf Hussain Khan's grandfather, Ghulam Hussain Khan, "spent the major part of his life in Dankaur, another small town in Uttar Pradesh in the district of Bulandshahar, before he moved to Khurja."

As the notion of the Khurja gharana largely revolves around the person and style of Ustad Altaf Hussain Khan, the musicians most closely associated with this gharana in the 20th century were those he was responsible for training. These included his sons, Mumtaz Hussain Khan and Wahid Hussain Khan, and his nephew, Azmat Hussain Khan. Azmat Hussain Khan combined Altaf Hussain Khan's style with additional input from Vilayat Hussain Khan of Agra gharana and Alladiya Khan of Jaipur-Atrauli gharana. In turn, Azmat Hussain Khan trained his brother-in-law, Aslam Khan, who combined this style with his prior background in the Hapur and Delhi gharanas. Azmat Hussain Khan's son Vajahat Hussain Khan received musical training not only from his father but also from Aslam Khan. Therefore, in this line, Khurja gharana indicates not an independent khandan but rather a body of compositions and stylistic approaches which musicians make use of alongside other material. On the other hand, Mumtaz Hussain Khan's and Wahid Hussain Khan's sons and grandsons have not received formal training outside the Khurja gharana.

== Pedagogical Genealogy ==
The following visualization is based on several historical accounts.

=== Ancestral Pedagogy of Khurja Gharana ===
Dagarbani Guru; Parampara	Nauharbani Guru; Parampara
Nath; Vishwambhar	Mohammed Hussain "Mendhu" Khan
Miyan Bade Karim; Baksh Khan	Jodhe; Khan
Miyan Mantol; Khan	Miyan Bhopat; Khan	Natthe; Khan
Miyan Zahoor; Khan	Miyan Gulab; Khan	Qayam; Khan
Miyan Hande Imam; Baksh Khan	Miyan Hussain; Khan	Dayam; Khan	Qawwal Bacchon; Guru Parampara
Ramzan Khan "Rangile"	Qadar; Khan	Imam; Khan	Qutub Baksh "Tanras" Khan
Rangile; Gharana	Miyan Chhajjoo; Khan	Miyan Dilawar "Dallooo" Khan	Ghulam Hussain; Khan "Allahdas"	Ghulam Gaus; Khan	Umrao; Khan
Jahangir; Khan	Khwaja Ahmed; Khan	Chiman; Khan	Ahmed; Khan	Ghulam Haider; Khan	Munshi Gafoor; Baksh Khan	Zahoor Baksh; Khan "Ramdas"	Abdul Karim; Khan	Delhi; Gharana
Khairat Ali; Khan	Amrunnissa; Begum	Haji Altaf; Hussain Khan	Karim; Begum	Ghulam Ahmed; Khan
Mohammed; Khan	Ghulam Ahmed "Alladiya" Khan	Haider; Khan
Mumtaz Hussain; Khan	Wahid Hussain; Khan	Daughter
Jaipur-Atrauli; Gharana	Agra; Gharana	Atrauli; Gharana	Hapur; Gharana
Rabiya; Begum	Aisha; Begum	Azmat Hussain; Khan "Dilrang"	Taufiq; Ahmed	Uvais; Khan	Javed; Khan	Pavez; Khusro
Vilayat Hussain; Khan "Pranpiya"	Sister of Shafi; Ahmed Khan	Daughter of Fakhruddin Khan	Aslam Hussain; Khan "Khushrang"	Sakhawat; Khan	Arshad; Khan	Rashid; Khan
Daughter of Altaf; Hussain Khan
Sarvat Hussain; Khan	Vajahat Hussain; Khan	Rafat Hussain; Khan	Sabahat Hussain; Khan

== Overview ==
According to S. K. Saxena, some of the distinguishing features of the Khurja gharana, as reflected in the performances of Ustad Altaf Hussain Khan, include "emphasis on the natural opennes of akara during the executions of tans, avoidance of sudden changes in their structural design, and a relatively infrequent employment of boltans." In the vilambit sthayi, "care is taken to keep out drut embellishments altogether and the unity between the different accents of the sthayi is maintained by resorting to what is popularly called kanbharna—that is, by interspersing them with thin, luminous lines of musical continuities, rather than with turns and twists of notes." Among the Ustad's favorite ragas, Saxena lists "tirwan, lalitabasant[,] suha, bhankar, nat, gaura, sri, jayat, lacchasakh, hem khem and shahana," as well as "varieties of gauri, bihag, nat, bilawal and mallhar."

Azmat Hussain Khan, in his performances, is noted as having emphasized "rare Ragas, complex Laykari, Taan-s with perfection, and diversity of compositions."

Aslam Khan's performances were noted as "evoking simultaneously the sweetness and gravitas that was characteristic of the Nauhar bani of dhrupad singing from which these khayal traditions are thought to have evolved."

The singing of Ghulam Khusro Khan, son of Wahid Hussain Khan and grandson of Haji Altaf Hussain Khan, has been described as "uniquly [sic] feminine, a signature of the Noharbani Khurja gharana."
