= Mukul Kulkarni =

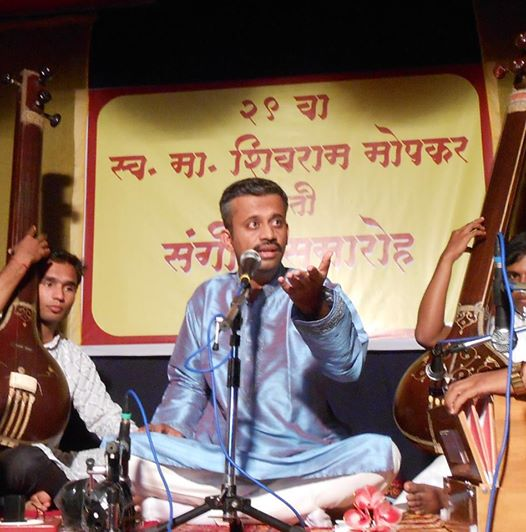
- Mukul Kulkarni in concert - Goa 2014

Background information
- Born: 1980 (age 45–46)
- Origin: Kolhapur, India
- Genre: Hindustani Classical Music
- Occupation: Vocalist
- Website: www.mukulkulkarni.com

Mukul Kulkarni is an Indian classical vocalist. He is disciple of Arun Kashalkar (Agra-Gwalior gharana) and Sharad Sathe (Gwalior gharana). He is a 'Top grade' artist of All India Radio. Mukul Kulkarni performs around India and abroad.

== Training ==
Mukul started learning classical vocal at the age of 10 years under N. G. Paramane. Mukul was awarded a scholarship from Center for Cultural Resources and Training, New Delhi. Then, during Mukul's engineering studies, he studied under Sukhada Kane, disciple of Limaye and Kane.

After his engineering studies, Mukul started learning from Vikas Kashalkar, who guided him through his MA in Music. Mukul completed his master's degree in Music from Lalit Kala Kendra (University of Pune) with a first class, receiving a gold medal for his achievement. Mukul is training under Pt. Arun Kashalkar, disciple of Gajananrao Joshi and Babanrao Haldankar. Mukul also trained under Sharad Sathe, disciple of Sharadchandra Arolkar and D.V. Paluskar.

== Vocalist career ==
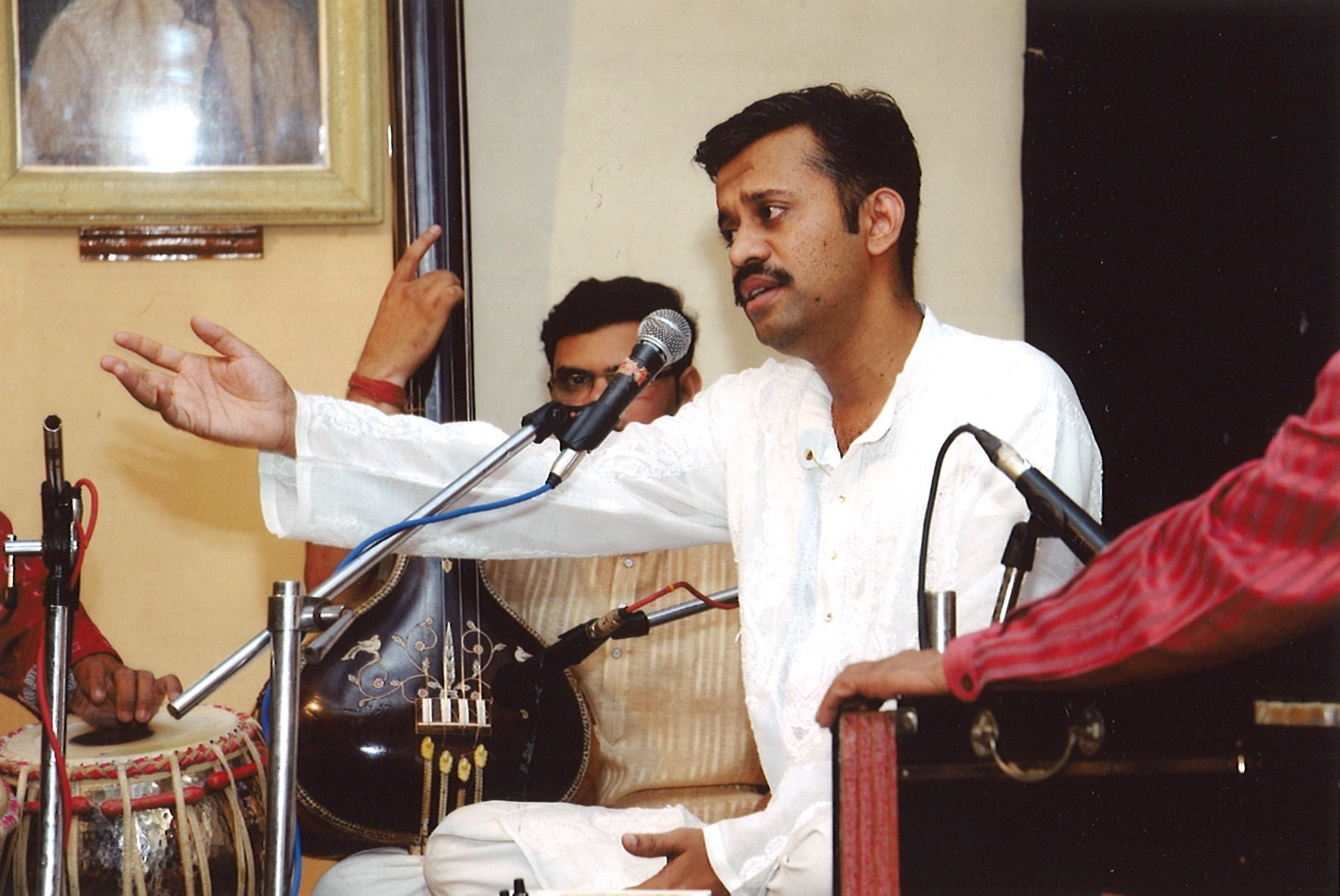
Mukul Kulkarni in concert, Kolhapur, February 2013.

Mukul Kulkarni is a vocalist of Gwalior-Agra Gharana. Mukul sings khyal, tappa, tap-khyal and has a large repertoire of old bandishes from the Gwalior Gharana. He is a 'Top grade' artist at All India Radio. He also was awarded the Pandit Gangadharbua Pimpalkhare Puraskar award, 12 June 2011.

Mukul Kulkarni has performed at various places all over India, including Pune, Mumbai, Goa, Ahmedabad, Benares, Kolhapur, Bokaro, Bangalore, Delhi, and Kochi. He has also toured the UK, performing many concerts as well as teaching, including concerts in Leicester, London, Hertfordshire, and Milton Keynes.

== Teaching career ==
Mukul Kulkarni is a teacher of Hindustani classical singing, and teaches students who come to him in India. He teaches students online worldwide and is also a teacher for 'SAAZ Music', a non-profit organisation in the UK. Through 'SAAZ Music', he teaches a large number of students during his tour of the UK, as well as teaching students from the UK online.
