= Raghuveer Ramnathkar =

Indian harmonium player

Raghuveer Ramnathkar was an Indian harmonium player and backdrop painter from Ramnathi. He was known across India for his proficiency in harmonium playing and manual craftsmanship.

== Life and career ==
Ramnathkar was born in Ramnathi. He possessed expertise in two craft-based arts: playing the harmonium and painting stage curtains.

He later moved to Bombay, where he achieved significant recognition and fame. Through his performance skills, he earned nationwide acclaim as a harmonium player.

== Legacy ==
Ramnathkar's musical legacy was carried forward by his two sons, Ratnakant Ramnathkar and Mohan Lal.
