= Aslam Hussain Khan =

Ustad Aslam Hussain Khan
- Born: April 14, 1940 (age 86)
- Died: March 21, 2018 (aged 77)
- Genres: Khyal, thumri, dadra, tarana, ghazal, bhajan
- Occupations: Vocalist, teacher, composer

Aslam Hussain Khan (14 April 1940 - 21 March 2018), also known as Ustad Aslam Khan, was an Indian classical vocalist, teacher and composer, belonging to the Khurja, Hapur, Agra, Jaipur-Atrauli, Delhi, and Sikandra gharanas. He was known for his performances of khyal, thumri, dadra, tarana, ghazal, and bhajan, and he composed under the pen-name "Khushrang." He also created new ragas such as Suryaranjini.

== Life and career ==
Aslam Khan was descended from Shadi and Murad Khan of Hapur gharana, who were dhrupad singers at the durbar of the last Mughal emperor, Bahadur Shah Zafar. However, he was initially trained in music by his maternal uncle, Altaf Hussain Khan of Khurja gharana. In 1950 or 1955, he moved to Mumbai, where he continued his training under Azmat Hussain Khan, who had also learned from Altaf Hussain Khan. He additionally studied with Vilayat Hussain Khan and Khadim Hussain Khan of Agra gharana, and learned classical compositions from members of Tanras Khan's Delhi gharana. In Mumbai, while living at Ruby Mansion where preceding generations of Agra-gharana singers had also lived, his students included Anwar, Manhar Udhas, Vrinda Mundkur, Vajahat Hussain Khan, Kamlakar Naik, Umesh Chowdhary, Meena Kothari, Kamla Jhangiani, Mansi Kanekar, Usha Amonkar, Vasanthi Raju, Angana Jhaveri, Brahmanand Singh, Sushant Bhende, and Shashikant Jha. He also composed and performed music for film, including most notably Kahan Se Aaye Badarwa (2007).

== Musical style and influences ==
Referring to the many gharanas in which he had received training, Aslam Khan was described as having "integrated these influences into a cohesive whole, evoking simultaneously the sweetness and gravitas that was characteristic of the Nauhar bani of dhrupad singing from which these khayal traditions are thought to have evolved." He was also "known for his repertoire of uncommon gharana specialty ragas." According to musician Nayan Ghosh, Aslam Khan was "one of the largest storehouses of rare ragas and bandishes (compositions) besides being an encyclopaedia of anecdotes and historical information of music(al) legends." He was noted for his knowledge of the Persian compositions of medieval Sufi poet Amir Khusrau, who is credited with originating or significantly developing several contemporary genres of Hindustani classical music.

According to noted musician and critic Amarendra Dhaneshwar, the style into which Aslam Khan was inducted by Azmat Hussain Khan "adopts a kind of voice-production, which uses a flatter version of the vowel 'a'. This facilitates production of stressful, accented music, which is conducive to rhythmically oriented elaboration of ragas. These singers also sing the 'nomtom' alaaps like a dhrupad singer." According to Batuk Dewanji, another noted critic, Aslam Khan had "adopted complex and intricate taan patterns of the ustads of Harpur [sic] gharana."
