= Babanrao =

Babanrao is a given name. Notable people with the name include:

- Babanrao Dhakne (1937–2023), Indian politician
- Babanrao Gholap, Indian politician
- Babanrao Haldankar (1927–2016), Indian singer
- Babanrao Lonikar (born 1965), Indian politician
- Babanrao Pachpute, Indian politician
