= Atrauli Gharana =

The Atrauli Gharana is a Hindustani music apprenticeship fraternity (gharana), founded by four brothers from the Gauharbani tradition who moved to Atrauli from Gwalior in the late-18th century. The gharana is best known for its influence and association, via intermarriage, with the Jaipur-Atrauli and Agra gharanas. It does not survive today as an independent khandan, but rather primarily as a corpus of compositions known to the vocalists of those two other lineages.

== History ==
The gharana was formed in the 18th century by four brothers - Hidayat Khan, Mughul Khan, Karim Hussain Khan, and Jabbar Khan - who were musicians that settled in Atrauli from Gwalior at the invitation of its Nawab.

Unlike the Agra Gharana, which comes from the Nauharbani tradition, and the Jaipur-Atrauli Gharana, which comes from the Dagarbani tradition, the Atrauli Gharana emerged from the Gauharbani tradition.

== Lineage ==
The following family trees are based on reports by Vilayat Hussain Khan.

=== Ancestral Lineage ===
Gauharbani Ancestors from Gwalior who settled in Atrauli
Hidayat; Khan	Mughul; Khan	Karim; Khan	Jabbar; Khan
Lal; Khan	Daughter, Wife of Tanras Khan	Hazi Zahoor; Khan	Daughter	Manshi Ghulam; Hussain	Noor; Khan
Chojja; Khan	Fazal; Khan	Inayat; Khan	Faiz; Khan	Riyaz; Khan	Mehboob Khan "Daraspiya"	Puttan; Khan	Jasiya Begum, Wife of Natthan Khan (Agrawale)	Vitto Begum, Wife of Ahmed Khan (Atrauliwale)	Munshi Jamal; Ahmed Khan	Jaipur-Atrauli; Gharana Tradition
Abbasi Begum, Wife of Safdar Hussain; Khan	Ahmed; Khan	Altaf Hussain Khan	Liaqat Hussain Khan	Daughter	Ata Hussain Khan	Bande Hasan Khan	Ajju Begum, Wife of Umrao Khan	Mariambi Begum, Wife of Audulla Khan (Agrawale)	Bashiran Begum, Wife of Faiyaz Hussain Khan	Allarakhe Begum, Wife of Liaqat Hussain Khan	Kamaal; Ahmed	Reyaz; Ahmed	Hasina Begum, Wife of Khadim Hussain Khan

== Prominent Musicians ==
- Mehboob Khan "Daraspiya"
- Puttan Khan
- Alladiya Khan
- Faiyaz Hussain Khan
- Vilayat Hussain Khan

== Bibliography ==
- Gaanyogini Dhondutai Kulkarni (2014). Sur Sangat. Rajhans Prakashan. ISBN 978-81-7434-694-0.
- Babanrao Haldankar (2001). Aesthetics of Agra and Jaipur Traditions. Popular Prakashan. ISBN 978-81-7154-685-5.
