= Ajit Kadkade =

Indian devotional singer (born 1951)

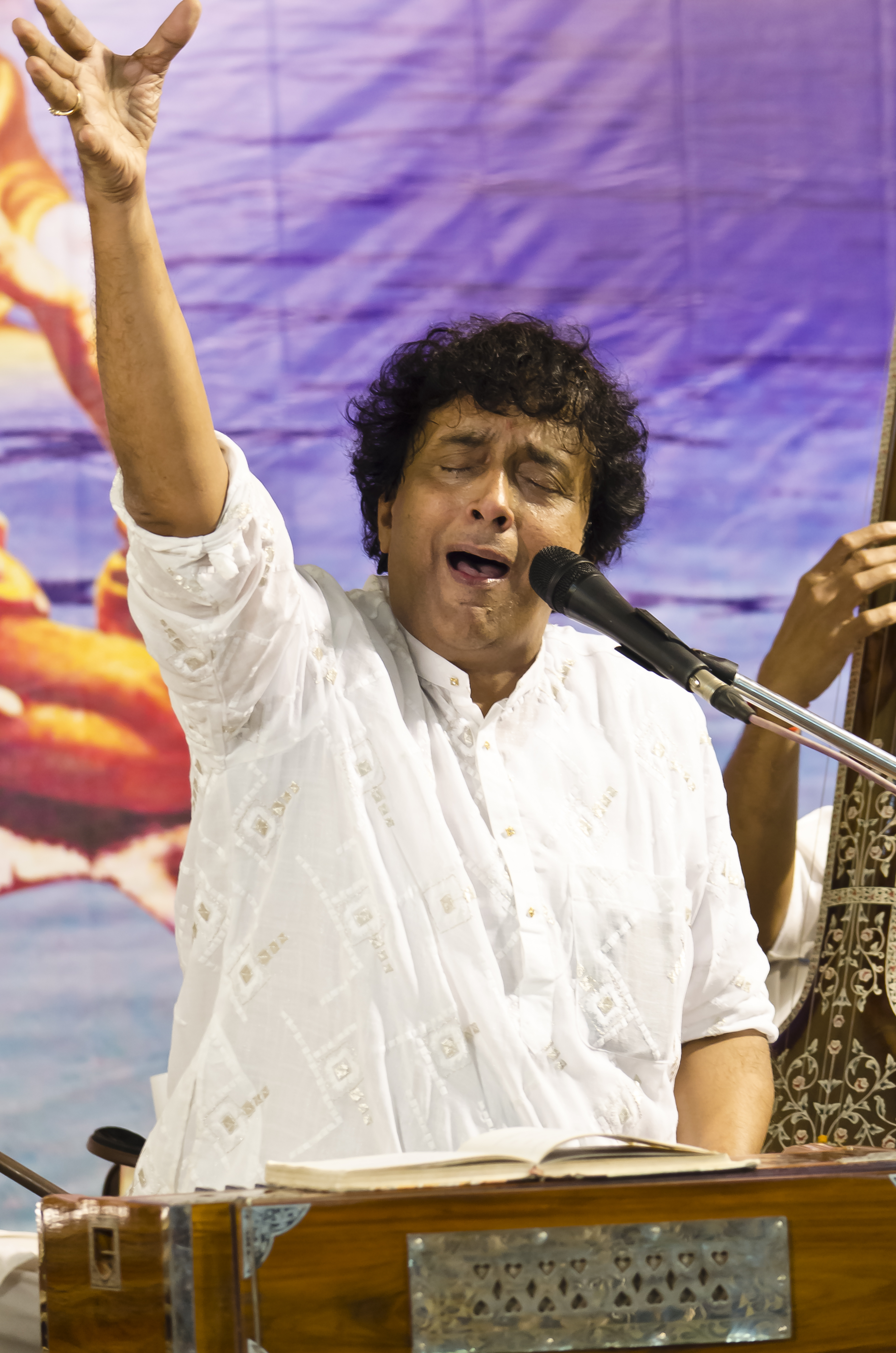
- Kadkade in 2014

Background information
- Born: 11 January 1951 (age 75); Bicholim, Portuguese Goa
- Genres: bhajans
- Occupation: Singer
- Instrument: Vocalist

Ajit Kadkade (born 11 January 1951) is a devotional singer in Goa and Maharashtra, India. He learnt Hindustani classical music from the famous singer Jitendra Abhisheki. Kadkade specializes in singing Marathi devotional songs (bhajans), abhangs, Natya Sangeet and Hindustani classical music.

== Early life ==
Ajit Kadkade was born in Bicholim, Portuguese Goa on 11 January 1951 to Sadanand and Prema Kadkade. From a young age, Ajit showed a deep interest in singing and music. At the age of twelve, he began learning the harmonium under the guidance of the famous Goan musician, the late Sakharambapu Barve. Due to his natural talent for melody and rhythm (Sur-Taal), he started mastering the nuances of classical music through the harmonium. Later, he continued his vocal training under Shripadbua Madye in Bicholim.

== Training ==
The famous Goan singer and composer Jitendra Abhisheki recognized Kadkade's immense potential. One day, after Abhisheki performed in Bicholim, he agreed to teach Kadkade. Abhisheki invited Kadkade to Mumbai for advanced training. Under Abhisheki's rigorous tutelage, Kadkade learnt advanced musical education. After several years, Kadkade began performing solo vocal concerts. Later, he also received guidance from Govindprasad Jaipurwale on the recommendation of Abhisheki.

== Musical theater (Natyasangeet) ==
Guided by Pt. Abhisheki, Kadkade made his debut on the Marathi stage in the play Sant Gora Kumbhar. He became famous both as a singer and a singing-actor. He then participated in several classic musical plays (Sangeet Natak), including Saubhadra, Sanshay Kallol, Kulvadhu, Mahananda, Kadhi Tari Kuthetari and Amrut Mohini.

== Devotional and popular music ==
While he gained fame as a singing-actor in plays, he dedicated significant time to classical vocal concerts. He has performed in major cities across India, including Delhi, Kolkata, Chennai, Hyderabad, Bhilai, Itarsi, Nagpur, Goa, Pune, Bilaspur, Belgaum, and Raipur, as well as in various cities outside India.

He is particularly celebrated for his soulful renditions of Bhajans, Abhangs, Bhaktigeet (devotional songs), Natyageet, and Konkani songs. He became a household name through his performances on All India Radio and Doordarshan. As of 1999, he has released approximately 45 independent audio cassettes and records. Some of his most famous and beloved songs include "Zoli De Kar Ya", "Bhaktivachuni Mukti Chi", "Sajal Nayan", "Kar Ha Kari" and "Vitthala Meech Khara Aparadhi". He has also performed and recorded several popular Konkani songs for the radio.

Famous bhajans sung by him include "Zoli bhar kar Lana", "Nighalo gheun datta chi palkhi", "Vrundavani Venu", "Devacha Dev bai thakada", "Bramha Shodhile Bramhand Milale", "Pag ghungaru bandh Mira nachi thi", "Khai ba sakhar loni mazya bala", "Devachiye Dwari Ubha Kshana bhari", "Naam Tujhe Barve Ga Shankar", "Nirmala Ma Bhagawati", "Marma bandhatali Thev hi" and "Swaliya Giri Dhari lala Khabar lena meri". His other famous abhang includes Nache Ganeshu which is one of his topmost selling Marathi bhajan album.
