= Yashpaul =

Background information
- Born: March 22, 1937; Gujranwala, Punjab, British India
- Died: July 3, 2023 (aged 86) Chandigarh, India
- Genres: Hindustani classical music
- Occupation: Vocalist
- Years active: 1948–2023

Pandit Yashpaul (22 March 1937 - 3 July 2023) was an Indian classical singer belonging to the Agra gharana (singing style).

== Early life ==
Yashpaul was born in Gujranwala in 1937. After the partition his parents migrated to India and settled in Jalandhar, where he was initiated into music by Kasturilal ‘Jassra’, who was the disciple of Chhote Ghulam Ali Khan of Lahore. He received further training from Vilayat Hussain Khan and Yunus Hussain Khan from the Agra gharana. He was also inspired by Bade Ghulam Ali Khan and Mallikarjun Mansur.

== Career ==
Yashpaul first performed when he was 11 years old at the "Harivallabh Sangeet Sammelan". He is the oldest alumni of Swami Harballabh Sangeet Akademi, Jalandhar. He has been performing on All India Radio since 1952. He has performed in many nationally-broadcast programmes of music, as well as annual Akashvani Sangeet Sammelans.

He is a composer and teacher. He has composed many bandishes under his pen name "Sagun Piya". He is a founder of Music Deptts at Panjab University and MCM DAV College of Women Chandigarh respectively. He retired as the Head of Department at the Department Music at Panjab University in 1997.

== Awards and honors ==
Awards received by Yashpaul include:.

- National Sangeet Natak Academy Award
- Award of National Scholarship, 1962 (Ministry of Education, Govt. of India)
- Punjab State award
- Punjab Sangeet Natak Academi award
- Dedicated Educationist award
- Sangeet Sumeru award
- Sangeet Shiromani award
- The Music Monarch of India’s north western region (the lifetime award by FFF)
- Honored by Senior Citizens Association of Chandigarh
- He is the founder and former Chairman of Deptts. of Music i.e., M.C.M. D.A.V. College for Women and Punjab University Chandigarh respectively
