= Kamala Bose =

Indian singer (1947–2012)

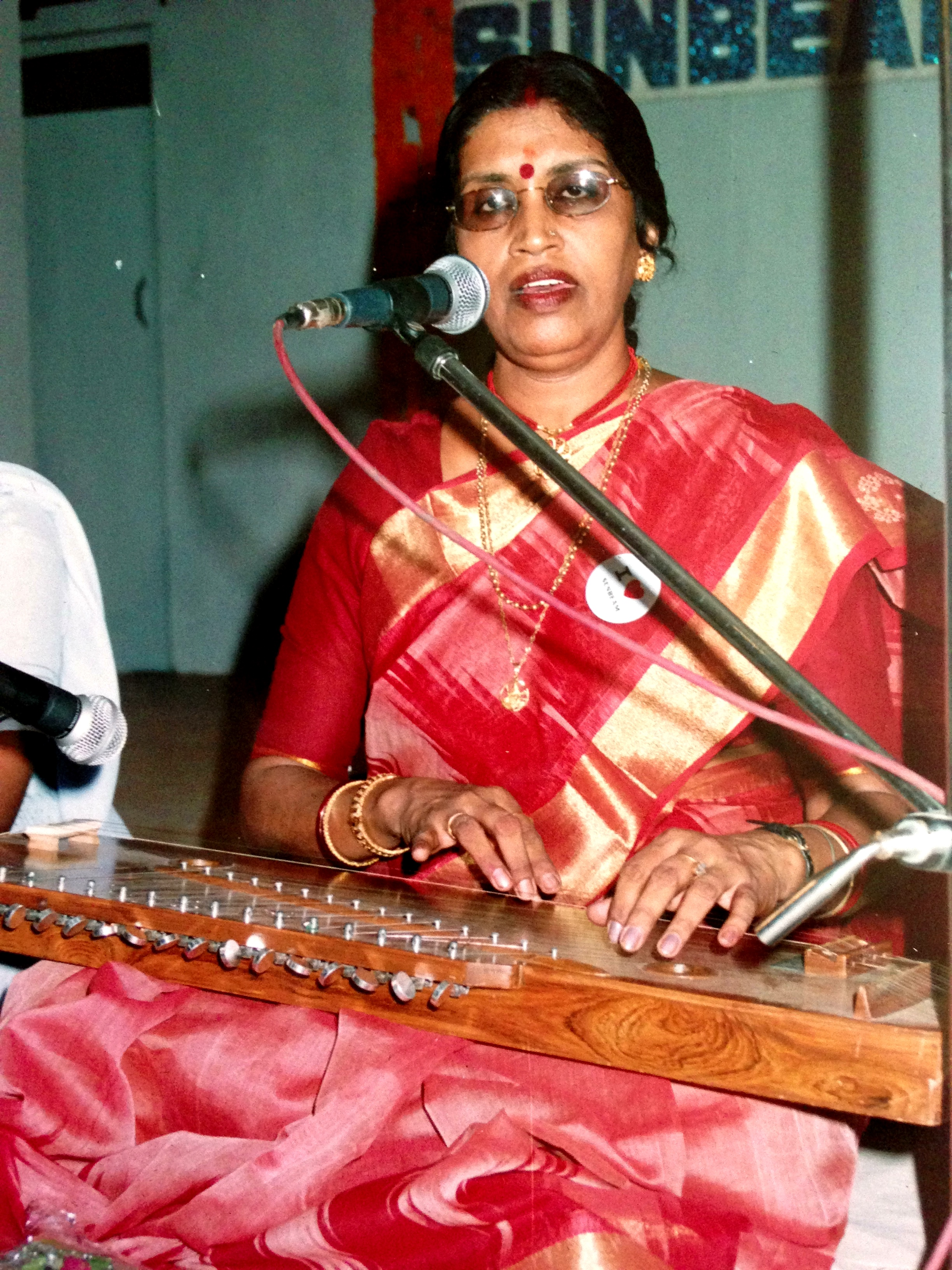
- Vidushi Kamala Bose at a concert in Allahabad
- Born: 26 November 1947; Mumbai, India
- Died: 16 June 2012 (aged 64); Allahabad, India
- Occupations: singer, composer, teacher
- Spouse: Bichitra Mohan Bose

Kamala Bose (Bengali) (1947–2012) was a prominent Indian classical vocalist.

== Biography ==
Kamala Bose (1947–2012) was an eminent vocalist in Hindustani Classical music based in Allahabad. She hailed from a family that is deeply rooted in the field of performing and fine arts and boasts of a rich musical tradition.

=== Early life ===
She was initiated in this field by her father, the late J.D. Mazumdar, a reputed violinist and music composer with the All India Radio (AIR). It was from him that she received her initial training, and at the age of 5, she already started humming the songs she would hear.

In 1969, she came under the tutelage of the renowned vocalist, musicologist, and teacher Pt. Ramashreya Jha of the Bhatt Gharana.

In 1977, she completed her master's degree from the Allahabad University in Allahabad with a distinction in Music Vocal. She specialized in classical vocal or the khayal form, light classical i.e., Thumri, Dadra, Chaiti, Hori, Kajari, etc., with great finesse.

== Career ==
Bose commenced her musical journey in 1970 with All India Radio (AIR), Allahabad as an "A" grade artist of classical vocal music. Subsequently, she was appointed as a panelist on the Audition Board by the Director General, AIR, New Delhi.

Bose's proscenium experience was wide. She traveled and performed in both India and abroad, participating in many major concerts, including the Sadarang Music Conference, Kolkata, Haridas Sangeet Sammelan, Mumbai, Sankat Mochan, Varanasi, Bangalore Sangeet Sabha, to name a few.

== Talk show ==
The A.I.R. in 'Sangeet Shiksha,' a special feature of 26 episodes, and the Gyan Vani Program on the FM Channel, comprising 10 episodes, invited her to disseminate her knowledge of classical music. Through them, she unraveled and simplified both the basics as well as the complex aspects of the development of the ragas. A Head of the Music Department at the Allahabad Degree College, Allahabad, she had great command over the theoretical aspects of Indian Classical Music in addition to her mastery over the performing side. She successfully conducted many workshops and lecture cum demo sessions prominent among which are:

- Lecture cum demo at the Sangeet Natak Academy, Lucknow in June 1993
- Lecture cum demo at the Benaras Hindu University, Varanasi in February 2000
- Lecture cum demo at Guwahati in November 2000, December 2001, June 2003 and June 2004.

== Personal life ==
Kamala was married to Sri Bichitra Mohan Bose. The couple raised two children: a son, Jayanto Bose, who is married to Hema Bose; and a daughter, Joita Bose Mandal. She is also the grandmother of two grandsons, Suryaaditya Bose and Saarthak Bose.

== Awards and recognitions ==
- Apart from her immaculate renditions of khayal, bhajans, geet, and Bengali raga-based compositions, she earned a reputation as a complete musician.
- Sur Singar Samsad, Mumbai, honored her with the coveted title 'Sur Mani.'
- Because of her genius and expertise in this performing art, the Director, Cultural Affairs, Government of Assam, and Bengali Social & Cultural Association, Allahabad have honored her.

== Performances ==
- "Kal Ke Kalakar", organized by Sur Singar Samsad, Mumbai, 1971, 1982
- Akhil Bharatiya Virat Sangeet Sammelan, Itawah, 1980
- Lucknow Festival organized by the Cultural Department, Government of Uttar Pradesh, 1981
- Swar Sadhana Samiti, Mumbai, 1982
- Swami Haridas Sangeet Sammelan, Mumbai, 1982
- Alauddin Khan Punya Tithi Samaroh, Varanasi, 1982
- Sangeet Sammelan, Vidisha, 1982
- Sangeet Sammelan, Bhopa, 1982
- Sankat Mochan Sangeet Samaroh, Varanasi, 1983,1997
- Ustad Faiyaz Khan Sangeet Sammelan, Agra, 1985
- Bhuvaneshwar Sangeet Samaroh, Bhuvaneshwar, 1985
- Avadh Sanskriti Kala Kendra, 1987
- 'Sadarang' Music Conference, Kolkata, 1988
- Shastriya Sangeet Sabha by 'Kala Snehi', New Delhi, 1991
- Bangalore Sangeet Sabha, 1993
- Music Conference Ranchi, 1993
- All India Nikhil Bharat Banga Sahitya Sammelan Adhiveshan, Allahabad,1996
- 'Ninad'at ABC Art Gallery, Varanasi, 2000
- Sangeet Nisha Gudai Maharaj Punya Tithi Samaroh, Varanasi, 2000
- Kashi Samaj Sangeet Sabha, Varanasi, 2000
- Music Conferences organized by Sangeet Sankalp of Delhi at Mumbai, Jaipur, Kota, Raipur and Kurukshetra.
- Classical Vocal, Thumri & Bhajan Recital at North Central Zone Cultural Center, Allahabad.
- All India Music Conference of the Prayag Sangeet Samiti, Allahabad, since 1971.
- Baba Ramdas Jayanti Samaroh, Sonepur, Bihar, 2004

Bose undertook extensive foreign tours in US in 2009 and has also performed in France, Switzerland, Germany, Italy, and Austria in 2003. The Italian TV in 1998 and Swiss National Radio in 1999 have also recorded her. Nandi Records released her first CD titled 'Reverberation' in 1998.
