= Veena Sahasrabuddhe =

Indian singer (1948–2016)

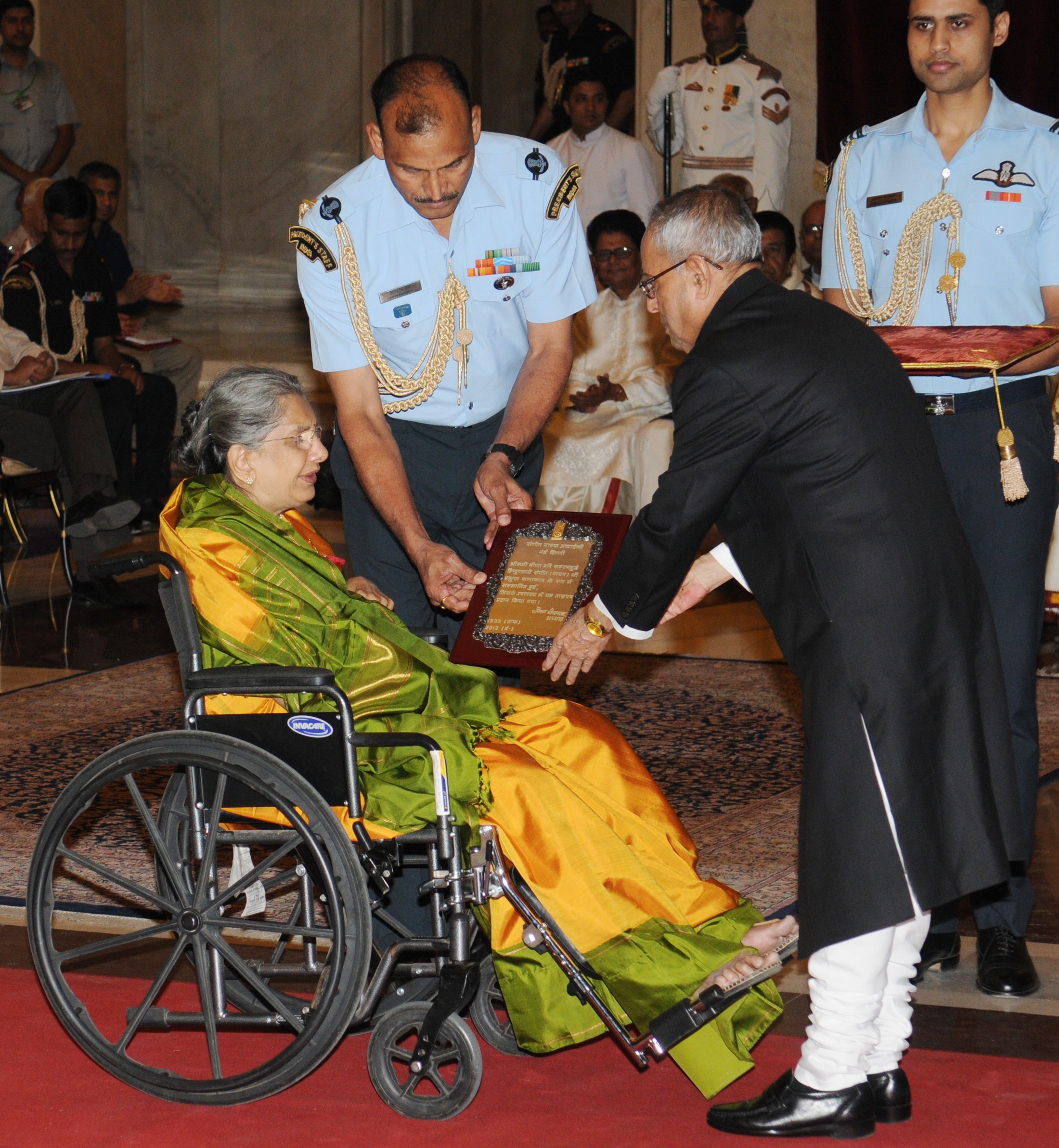
Pranab Mukherjee presenting the Sangeet Natak Akademi Award-2013 to Ms. Veena Sahasrabudhe, in the field of Hindustani Vocal Music

Veena Sahasrabuddhe (14 September 1948 – 29 June 2016) was an Indian vocalist and composer of Hindustani classical music from Kanpur. Her singing style had its roots in Gwalior gharana, but it also borrowed from Jaipur and Kirana gharanas. Sahasrabuddhe was known as a singer of khyal and bhajan.

== Musical career ==
Veena Sahasrabuddhe was born in a musical family. Her father Shankar Shripad Bodas was a disciple of vocalist Vishnu Digambar Paluskar. She began her early musical education under her father, and then under her brother Kashinath Shankar Bodas. She also learned Kathak dancing in her childhood. Sahasrabuddhe's musical mentors included Balwantrai Bhatt, Vasant Thakar, and Gajananrao Joshi.

She had a bachelor's degree in vocal performance, Sanskrit literature, and English literature from Kanpur University (1968), a master's degree (Sangeet Alankar) in vocal performance from A.B.G.M.V. Mandal (1969), and also master's degree in Sanskrit from Kanpur University (1979). A.B.G.M.V. Mandal conferred on her a doctorate in vocal music (Sangeet Praveen) in 1988. For some years she was the head of the department of music at SNDT Pune campus. She performed all over India and in several countries around the world.

== Early life ==
Her father Shankar Shripad Bodas was one of the earliest students of Vishnu Digambar Paluskar who founded the famous Gandharva Mahavidyalaya. Bodas was specially invited by Paluskar to move to Kanpur from Mumbai and spread music. Bodas and Shanta migrated to Kanpur in 1926, founded a Sangit Samaj and began teaching students, inviting other performers and propagating music. The Paluskar tradition was essentially in the Gwalior Gharana style and temperament of singing. Kanpur was an industrial town without any notable cultural life, particularly classical music. Until then, Uttar Pradesh had other places such as Banaras and Allahabad where music thrived. Veena's mother Shanta was also a singer and taught music in local schools in Kanpur. Veena grew up in this musical atmosphere at home. In addition to training from her father, she also trained with her brother Kashinath.

== Death ==
Veena Sahasrabuddhe gave her last concert on 2 December 2012. She was diagnosed with progressive supranuclear palsy. She died on 30 June 2016.

== Awards ==
- A prize in Vocal Classical category in a national competition for artists under age 25, conducted by All India Radio (1972)
- Uttar Pradesh Sangeet Natak Akademi Award (1993)
- Sangeet Natak Akademi Award (2013)
- Akhil Bharatiya Gandharva Mahavidyalaya Mandal (ABGMV) confers posthumously the Honorary Degree " संगीत महामहोपाध्याय " (2019)
