= Sharafat Hussain Khan =

Indian classical vocalist

- Born: 1 July 1930; Atrauli, Uttar Pradesh, British India
- Died: 7 July 1985 (aged 55)
- Years active: 1930 - 1985
- Awards: Padma Shri award by the Government of India in 1983; Sangeet Natak Academy award in 1985; Tansen Award

Sharafat Hussain Khan (1 July 1930 – 7 July 1985) was an Indian classical vocalist from the Agra Gharana (singing style).

== Early life and background ==
Sharafat Hussain Khan was born at a small city called Atrauli in Uttar Pradesh in July 1930. His father's name was Liaquat Hussain Khan, a court musician in the Jaipur State, and his mother's name was Alla Rakhi Beghum. Sharafat's father's roots go back to classical musician Inayet Hussain Khan (1845 – 1936) who founded Atrauli Gharana. His maternal grandfather was Mehboob Khan (Daras Piya). Mehboob Khan also belonged to Atrauli Gharana. Sharafat Hussain Khan's music was greatly influenced by the Rangile Gharana of his mother's family. This gharana was founded by Ramzan Khan (1759–1806). Sharafat was trained in classical music by his father, when he was still a child. When Sharafat was only eight years old, his apparent talent impressed the legendary Faiyaz Khan (1880 – 5 November 1950), who happened to be his maternal uncle, during one of his visits to Atrauli. The maestro Faiyaz Khan had no sons. So he adopted Sharafat, and took him away to Baroda to train him in classical music as his heir.

The vocal maestro of Agra gharana, Faiyaz Khan gave Sharafat Hussain Khan a chance to sing on stage after him and to continue singing where he himself had left off, when Sharafat was about 13 years old. The audience showed much appreciation to the young boy's singing talent. He also used to accompany Faiyaz Khan's singing in a supportive role playing the instrument called Tanpura in many concerts. Some music critics believe that Sharafat Hussain Khan deserved to get more credit for his singing talent than he actually did during his lifetime.

== Musical training ==
Sharafat was only 20 years old, when Faiyaz Khan died. After his death, his maternal uncle Ata Hussain Khan started training him. Later Vilayat Hussain Khan of the Agra gharana became his father-in-law and continued training him. Sharafat Hussain Khan was a product of training by three classical music gharanas - Agra gharana, Jaipur-Atrauli gharana, and Rangile gharana.

Sharafat Hussain Khan was made an Honorary Fellow of the Performing Arts Academy of Uttar Pradesh.

== Awards ==
- Tansen Award
- Padma Shri Award by the President of India (1983)
- Sangeet Natak Akademi Award (1985)

== Death ==
Sharafat Hussain Khan died due to lung cancer on 7 July 1985, at the age of 55.
