= Raja Kale =

Rajaram (Raja) Kale
- Born: Rajaram Prabhakar Kale
- Genres: Hindustani classical music
- Occupation: singer

Pandit Rajaram alias Raja Kale is an Indian vocalist, composer, and scholar of Indian classical, semi-classical, and devotional music. He is a senior disciple of Pandit Jitendra Abhisheki. He also received valuable guidance from Pt. C. P. Rele and Pt. Balasaheb Poonchwale from the Gwalior gharana. Pt. Raja Kale is known for rendering both old and new Hindustani classical music with an approach that is at once eclectic and focused on the performance.

He holds a PhD (1990) with the thesis Importance of Bandish in Khayal. He has also received senior fellowship from the Department of Culture of the Government of India for the study of the subject: "Comparative study and analysis of "Gayaki" of Legendary singers Pandit Bhimsen Joshi, Pandit Kumar Gandharva, Pandit Jitendra Abhisheki, and Pandit Jasraj. He has performed live on several notable occasions, and on broadcast media, including TV, Radio in India and KZSU Stanford 90.1 FM on Chaitime.

== Early life and background ==
Pt. Raja Kale received his initiation in music from his father Prabhakarrao Kale, and further training from Pandit Uttamrao Agnihotri. He then studied music with Pandit Jitendra Abhisheki, a veteran vocalist and a great composer of classical and semi-classical forms of Hindustani classical music.

== Awards ==
- Gaanatapaswini Mogubai Kurdikar Jeevan Gaurav Puraskar 2026
- National Tansen Award of the Government of Madhya Pradesh for the year 2024
- Pandit Bhimsen Joshi Smriti Puraskar, 2021
- Vatsalabai Joshi Puraskar, 2007

== Discography ==
- Raag Sarita, His Master's Voice
- Seasons, Pan Music
- Bandish, Prathamesh Arts
- Apoorva Geete, Mala entertainment
- Album on Classical Music, Alurkar Cassette Co.
- Krishna, Ninad Music Co.
- HM Volume 2, Colour Red Dog: Raja Kale, His Master's Voice

== Notable performances ==
- Tansen Samaroh, Gwalior
- Sawai Gandharva Punyatithi Mahotsov, Pune
- Guru Shishya Parampara concert, with Guru Jitendra Abhisheki, ICCR New Delhi
