= Shounak Abhisheki =

Indian Classical Singer and composer

Pandit Shounak Abhisheki
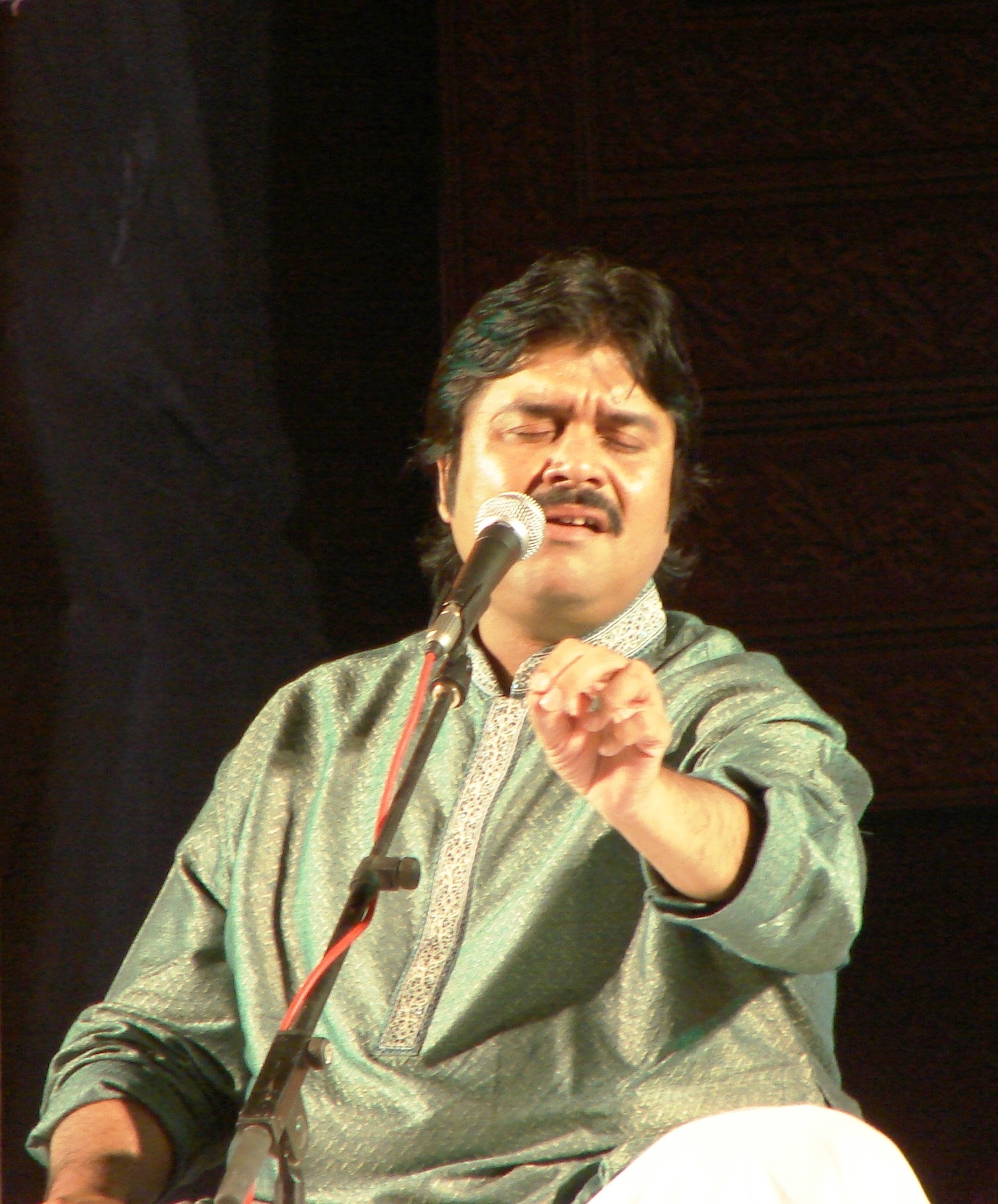
- Shounak Abhisheki singing in Vasantotsav 2011

Background information
- Also known as: Shounak Abhisheki
- Origin: Mangeshi, Goa, India
- Genres: Classical, semi-classical, devotional, natya sangeet
- Occupation(s): Singer, composer
- Website: Artists website

Pt. Shounak Abhisheki is an Indian vocalist, composer of classical, semi-classical, and devotional music. He is the son of Jitendra Abhisheki

== Profile ==
Shounak Abhisheki, the son and disciple of Maestro Pt. Jitendra Abhisheki, is a vocalist who combines Agra and Jaipur styles of Hindustani Classical Music. Abhisheki trained under Smt. Kamaltai Tambe of the Jaipur Gharana.

== Career ==
Shounak has performed special programs such as Swarabhishek, Tulsi Ke Ram & Kabir and Abhang, based on his father's compositions.

In addition to several Indian music festivals, he has performed a series of concerts in the United States, the United Kingdom, the Soviet Union, the Persian Gulf and Thailand.

Shounak has been recorded by Sony Music, Music Today, Times Music, Ninad Music, Music Curry, and Fountain Music.

== Awards and recognitions ==
- Pune Ki Asha Puraskar
- Balgandharva Puraskar
- Zee Gaurav Puraskar
- N.C.P.A. Excellence Award
- Pt. Dinanath Mangeshkar Puraskar by Marathi Natyaparishad
- Saraswatibai Rane Puraskar
- Symbiosis University Cultural Award
