= Nanua Chaprasi =

Indian Hindu spiritual guru and saint

Nanua Chaprasi (26 June 1920 - 7 July 2009) was a Hindu spiritual guru and saint from Ramghat near Atrauli in Uttar Pradesh.

Shri Nanua Chaprasi

He was born in a landholder Brahmin family on 26 June 1920 as Vishnu Dutt Dikshit at Ramghat, Bulandshahar district, Uttar Pradesh.His maternal village was Badaun.

He became an enlightened soul ( a siddha ) after 14 years of Sādhanā under a Banyan tree. The tree is now named as 'Sidhha Bari' located near the bank of River Ganges in Ramghat and site of pilgrimage now for his disciples.

He preached that one's past sins are reasons for one's present sufferings. He formulated and advised the rites needed to get rid of our bad Karma, which are cause of our present sufferings. Further, he also preached that in present era of Kaliyuga, one has to also worship powers of Kaliyuga for one's well-being. He also preached the people should not kill even a small insects. He did not believe in differentiation in name of caste, creed or religion and preached all human beings are same irrespective of religion, caste or race.

He died on 7 July 2009 at Ramghat. His main temple housing his samadhi and ashram is located at Ramghat. Further, he spent lot of time meditating at an island in middle of the pond at Pesri, where his idol and temple is located and managed by Nanuaji's disciples.

He had many followers mainly from Uttar Pradesh, Delhi and also in Aurangabad, Maharashtra, who visit his ashram especially on day of Guru Poornima, when special arrangements and havana is held at the ashram established by him. Another large temple dedicated to him has opened in 2020 in Talbehat, by his disciples from Jhansi district and Lalitpur District.

He preached religious harmony and people of all sects. Hindus, Jains, Sikhs, Muslims, Christians, and Buddhists were amongst his followers.
