= V. Ramarathnam =

- V. Ramarathnam
- Born: 1917; Chittoor
- Died: 15 November 2008 (aged 90–91)
- Known for: Carnatic music

V. Ramarathnam (1917–2008) was a Carnatic musician, author, teacher and composer known under the mudra Rama. His career spanned approximately 70 years until his death in 2008.

He studied under Sangeetha Rathna Mysore Chowdiah, and later became the first Principal of the University College of Music and Dance in Mysore, a position which he held until his retirement in 1987. During his career he composed around 25 kritis in well known ragas in Sanskrit, Telugu and Kannada. He also wrote or co-wrote thirteen books about the theoretical and practical aspects of Carnatic music. Ten of these books have been published by the University Press at the University of Mysore.

== Published books ==
- Sangeetha Darpana, University of Mysore, Prasaranga Publication, 1969
- Karnataka Sangeetha Sudha, co-written with Dr. V.S. Sampathkumaracharya, University of Mysore, Prasaranga Publication, 1967
- Sangeetha Ratna T. Chowdiah's Compositions, Published by University of Mysore, 1975
- Sangeetha Shastra Parichaya Vols 1 and 2, co-written with R.N. Doraiswamy
- Karnataka Sangeetha Krithirachana Sangraha Volume 1, 1992.
- Pallaki Seva Prabhandham, co-written with M.V. Rathna, University of Mysore, Prasaranga, 1974.
- Noukacharithram, co-written with R.N. Doraiswamy, 1969.
- Karnataka Sangeethadha Lakshya Lakshana Sangraha, Published by University of Mysore, Prasaranga.
- Mysore Sadhashivarayaru, Published by Karnataka Sangeetha Nrithya Academy, Bangalore 1997.
- Karnataka Sangeetha Deepeke, co-written with Dr. V.S. Sampathkumaracharya, Published by D.V.K. Murthy, Mysore, 2000.
- Keerthana Tharangini- published by D.V.K. Murthy, Mysore, 2000.
- Contribution and Patronage of Mysore Wodeyars to Carnatic Music, Published by Kannada Book Authority, Bangalore, India
- Apurva Vaggeya Kruthimanjari, Published by D.V.K. Murthy, 2004
- Muthuswami Dikshithara Navagraha Krithigalu, Published by D.V.K. Murthy, 2004
- Muthuswami Dikshithara NavaVarna Krithigalu, Published by D.V.K. Murthy, 2004
- Reminiscence of a Musician - Released as part of Prof. Ramarathnam's 90th Birthday Celebration in December 2006.
- Apurva Vaggeya Kruthimanjari (Vol ii), released in 2007
- Padams and Javali's, released in 2009

== See also ==
- Carnatic Music
