= Indrani Mukherjee (singer) =

Indian vocalist

Indrani Mukherjee ইন্দ্রানী মুখার্জী
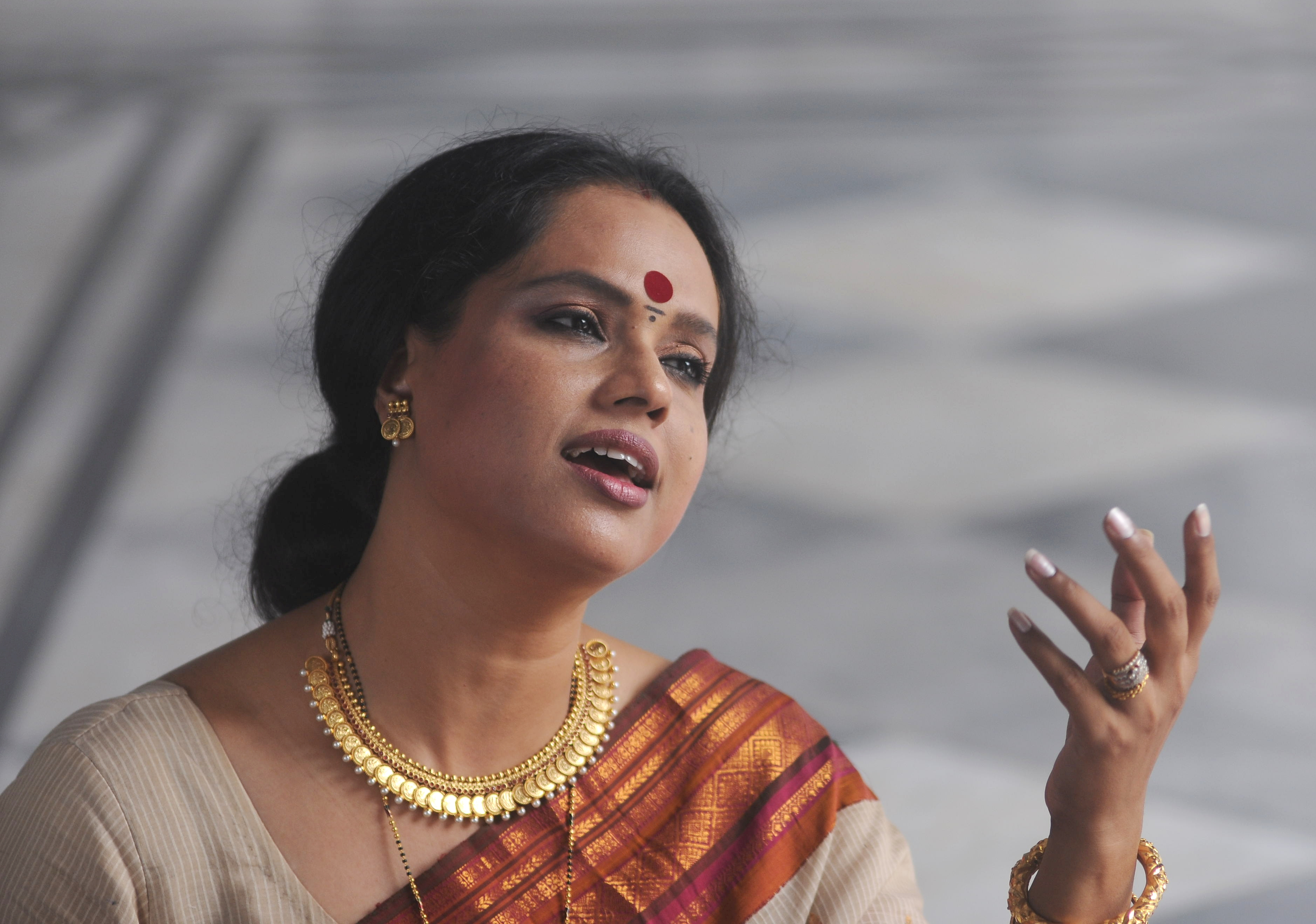

Background information
- Born: 25 January 1974 (age 51) Asansol, West Bengal, India
- Genres: Khyal, Thumri
- Occupation: Vocalist
- Spouse: Apurba Mukherjee (Tabla Player)

Indrani Mukherjee (Bengali: ইন্দ্রানী মুখার্জী; born 25 January 1974) is a Hindustani classical vocalist and Thumri exponent in India. Her singing repertoire covers Khyal (Kirana - Rampur style) and Thumri (Purab Ang).

She was a scholar student of ITC Sangeet Research Academy, Calcutta in 1996 under the guidance of Pandit Arun Bhaduri. She pursued her learning with the Late Vidushi Purnima Choudhury and the Late Pandit Ramashreya Jha Ji of Allahabad. Since 2012, Indrani started learning with Vidushi Manju Sundaram Ji of Varanasi.

She is an empanelled artist of Indian Council for Cultural Relations and Spic Macay and high grade artist in All India Radio for Khyal and Thumri.

== Early life ==
Indrani was born in 1974 in Asansol, West Bengal, India. She is the daughter of Smt. Shikha Chatterjee (singer) and Sri Krishna Gopal Chatterjee (architect). As she was born in a musical family, therefore, from childhood she exhibited a keen interest in music.

Initially her learning started with her Mother and Aunt. When she was 3 years old, she took taalim from her maternal Grand Father Shri Sanjib Banerjee, disciple of the late Pandit A.T.Kanan.

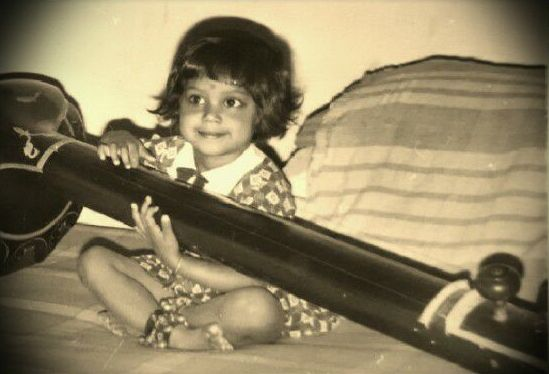
Indrani at the age of 3

At the age of 14, her grand father asked about her aim of life, when she realised that she wants to become a professional singer. She is the first member in the family to take music as profession. On her first public performance, in 1995, she impressed the Padma Bhushan awardee Pandit Buddhadev Das Gupta, who suggests her to shift in Kolkata. After completing her Graduation degree in Political Science in 1995 from Burdwan University she joined the ITC Sangeet Research Academy. In 1996, Indrani was selected as a scholar of the prestigious ITC Sangeet Research Academy, Calcutta and came under the able guidance of Pandit Arun Bhaduri, and continued till his demise in 2018. Indrani is the first official Scholar in ITC Sangeet Research Academy under Pt. Arun Bhaduri.

"Playing the protagonist in the audio-drama is Bhaduri's first disciple at Sangeet Research Academy – Indrani Mukherjee. Bhaduri still can't believe that Mukherjee took such an initiative. Calling it a fitting 'Gurudakshina', Bhaduri is overwhelmed by her efforts."
The Times of India, Times City, Kolkata, 15.12.2015 - Priyanka Dasgupta.

== Career ==
Indrani has decided to take her passion as profession at the age of 14 and then she continued her formal training in classical music seriously. After completing the residential course of ITC Sangeet Research Academy Kolkata, she left the institution in 2001 to make independent career but continued her Taalim with Pt. Arun Bhaduri Ji.

== Performance ==
"Indrani Mukherjee from Kolkata left an indelible impression of her artistic sensibilities during her vocal that opened with the challenging raga Puriya. Opting for a raga like Puriya and Sarangi for sangat instead of the harmonium marked high standard from the beginning." The Hindu, 11.02.2016 by Smt Manjari Sinha.

=== International ===
She has played a pivotal role in making of the album "Benares", an international collaboration project with Erik Truffaz, Malcolm Braff and Apurba Mukherjee in 2008.

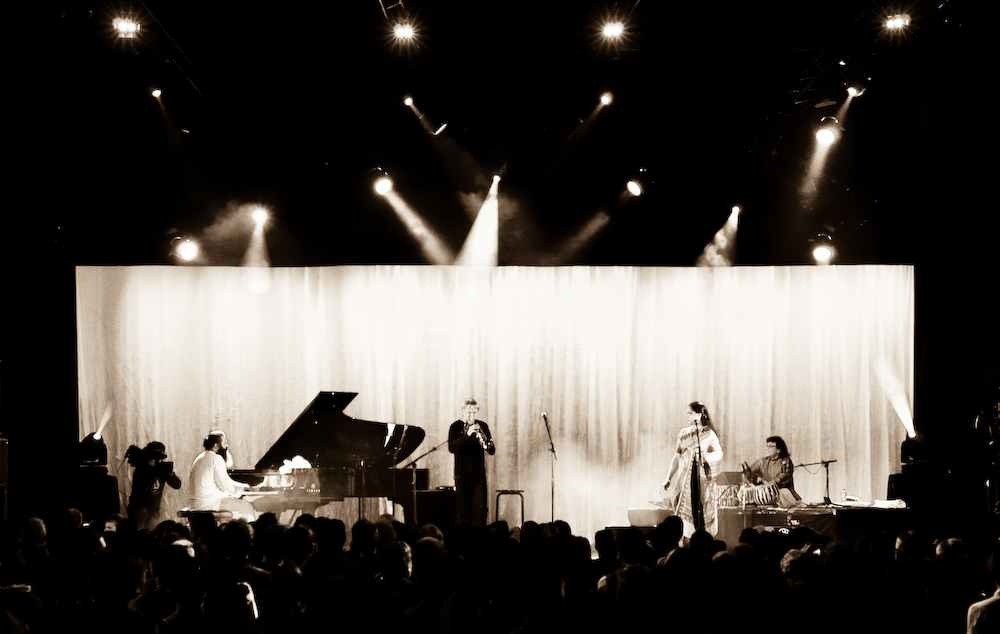
Indrani performing at Paleo Festival, Switzerland

"Mukherjee's overwhelming voice in particular gave the night a touch of magic that will leave a lasting impression upon the Music Hall audience. Indrani Mukherjee took the stage and the atmosphere changed. The instruments moved to the background and the Indian vocalist's strong emotive voice filled the room. The performance was now more arranged, less improvised, but every time her voice paused it provided Truffaz's trumpet the room to cling magically in the air." The Daily Star (28 August 2008), Lebanon by Raphael Thelen.

== Personal life ==
Indrani married Sri Apurba Mukherjee, a renowned tabla player and a disciple of Pandit Shankar Ghosh. They have a son, Anjishnu Mukherjee (Born in 2004), who is also maintaining the family tradition of music.
