= Arun Kashalkar =

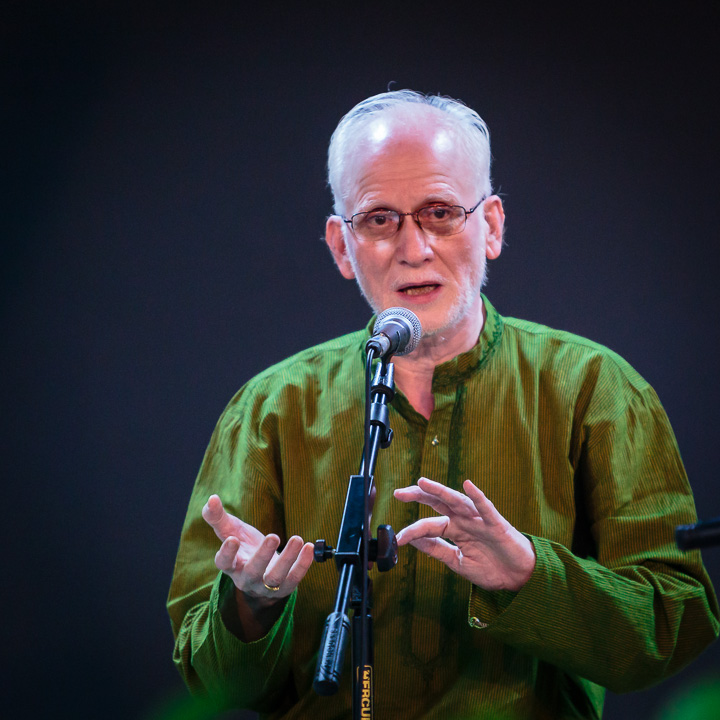
- Arun Kashalkar in concert, Singapore

Background information
- Also known as: 'Rasdaas'
- Genres: Hindustani classical music
- Occupation: Vocalist
- Website: www.arunkashalkar.com

Pandit Arun Kashalkar (born 5 January 1943) is an Indian classical vocalist. He is a teacher to many students and performs in India and abroad. His singing is a blend of Gwalior, Jaipur and Agra styles, with the emphasis on Agra.

== Training ==
Arun Kashalkar first learnt music from his father, N. D. Kashalkar, a lawyer and musicologist. He then studied under D.V. Panke and Rajabhau Kogje (disciple of Vinayakrao Patwardhan).

Arun also received training from Ram Marathe, Gajananrao Joshi and Babanrao Haldankar.

== As a vocalist ==
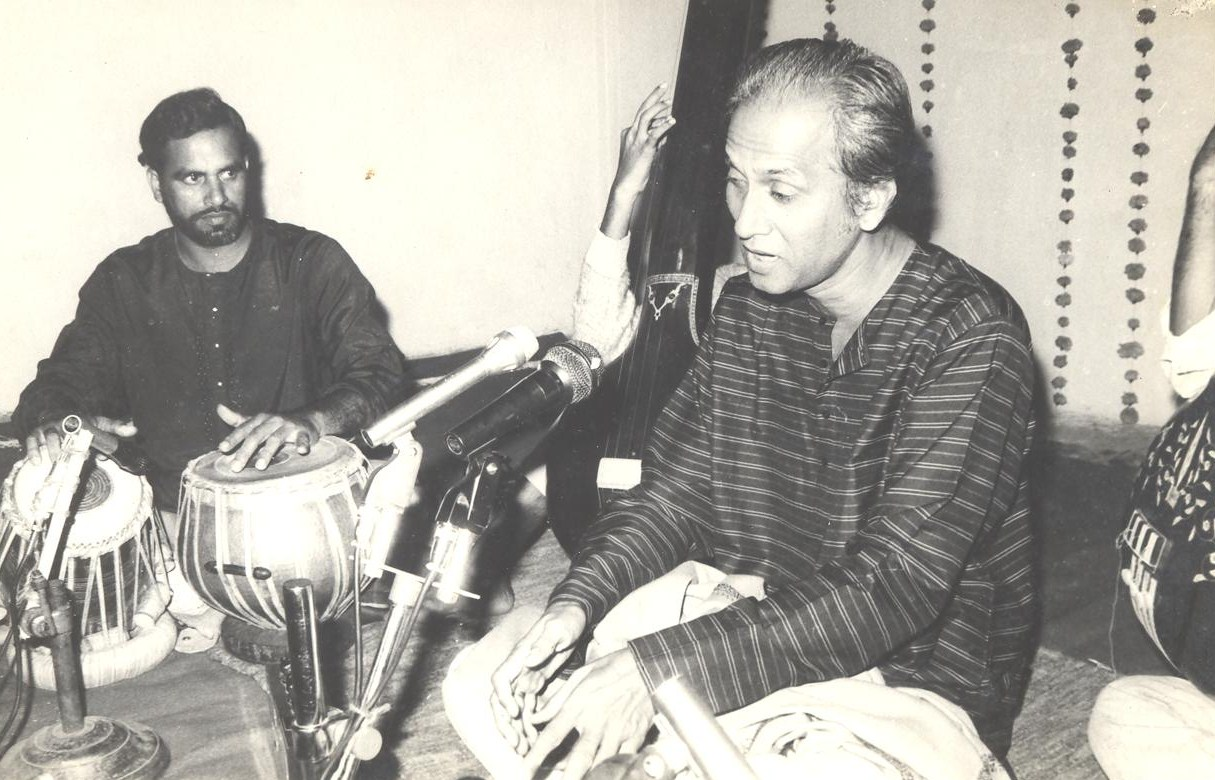
Arun Kashalkar in concert, Vibhav Nageshkar on Tabla

Arun's singing has an emphasis on the lively and rhythm-oriented style of the Agra gharana. His performances are known for the essence of Agra with his use of 'nomtom', 'bols', 'taans' with great force and boundless creativity. He has composed over 150 bandishes in his book 'Swar Archana' under the pseudonym of 'Rasdaas'. He has performed all over India, as well as Singapore and the USA.

== As a guru ==
Arun's disciples include Mukul Kulkarni, (graded by All India Radio and a performing vocalist). Ravindra Parchure is his prominent disciple who learnt from him in traditional Guru-Shishya style of learning. He also visits Singapore where he performs and gives workshops at the Temple of Fine Arts.

== Awards ==
- Senior Fellowship awarded by Dept of Culture, Govt. of India, for Outstanding Artists for the research "Impact of Gharana based training and successful techniques to impart quality music education".
- "Sangeet Ratna" by Kashi Sangeet Samaj, Varanasi, March 2010
- "Sangeetacharya" by Akhil Bharatiya Gandharva Mahavidyalay – his thesis "Aesthetic principles in Ustad Vilayat Hussain Khan's compositions"
- Sangeet Shikshak Puraskar, Dadar
- Maharashtra Sangeet Samaj, Ujjain, honoured Pandit Arun Kashalkar for his contribution in the field of Indian classical music
- Swar Sadhana Puraskar, Mumbai
- Open classical vocal competition: Arun Kashalkar (at age 13) was awarded first prize at the hands of Hon. Chief Minister, Madhya Pradesh, in 1955
