= Jayashree Patanekar =

Background information
- Born: Jayashree Patanekar; 13 June 1943 (age 83)
- Origin: Belgaon, Karnataka
- Genres: Hindustani Classical, Khayal
- Occupation: Hindustani Classical vocalist

Jayashree R. Patanekar is a Hindustani classical vocalist. She has received training in Gwalior, Jaipur and Kirana gharana. She has received training from the great maestro Gajananrao Joshi.

== Early life and Tutelage ==
Jayashri Patanekar's family is originally from Sawantvadi. Patanekar was initiated into Hindustani classical music by the late Vithalrao Pai at Sawantwadi. Her family shifted base to Goregaon in Mumbai. Her father was a painter and later started working in secretariat. When she was 16, She began learning under K. D. Gavkar of the Kirana gharana at Mumbai. Gavkar guruji was disciple of Abdul Karim Khan. She learnt from him for quite some time and participated in All India Radio music competition in 1963 where she came second. Her recording was sent in Delhi and later in 1964, she came first in the entire country. Her family decided to organize a small function to felicitate Gavkar guruji. It was during this function she met Gajananrao Joshi, who was the chief guest of the program. Gajananrao Joshi graciously agreed to train her. It was under Gajananrao Joshi (violinist and vocalist) that she matured as a vocalist. Joshi trained her in all aspects of the vocal music and nuances of Jaipur, Gwalior style of singing. She also took guidance from Nivruttibua Sarnaik and Pandit Ratnakar Pai of Jaipur gharana.

== Performances ==
A regular artiste of All India Radio, she has performed for AIR Mumbai and from 1977 onwards from AIR Dharwad. Recognized as an 'A' Grade artiste in 1983, she has performed for National Programmes as well as Tuesday Night Concerts. A regular concert performer, she has participated in music conferences in the major cities of India as well as the NCPA, Dadar-Matunga Music Circle, Sawai Gandharva Music Festival, Pune (1975, Jayashri Patkar before marriage and in 1992), Gwalior Sangeet Sammelan, Gwalior, Basant Sangeet Sammelan, Delhi and the AIR Sangeet Sammelan, Lucknow (2000).

== Awards ==
- Award by Karnatak Sangeeta Nritya Academy (by the Government of Karnataka, 2012)
- Dr. Mallikarjun Mansoor Puraskar (by the Government of Karnataka, 2005)
- Surmani (By Sursingar samsad at Kal-Ke-Kalakar Sammelan in Mumbai, 1972)
