= Ramashreya Jha =

- Also known as: Ramrang
- Born: Ramashreya Jha; 11 August 1928
- Died: 1 January 2009 (aged 80)
- Genres: Indian classical music, Hindustani classical music
- Occupations: singer, composer, teacher
- Award: Sangeet Natak Akademi Award (2005)

Ramashreya Jha 'Ramrang' (11 August 1928 – 1 January 2009) was a distinguished composer, singer, scholar and teacher of Hindustani classical music. A disciple of Bholanath Bhatt, he was the head of the Department of Music in Allahabad University from 1980 to 1989, and composed Khayal under the pen name Ramrang. He was known for his deep knowledge, creative genius and his gifts as a teacher. His five-volume anthology Abhinava Geetanjali ranks high among the most influential works in Hindustani music. It contains critical analysis of ragas supplemented by numerous traditional and self-conceived compositions.

== Early life and training ==
He was born in Khajura village near Darbhanga in the Mithila region of Bihar. His father, Sukhdev Jha, and his uncle, Madhusudan Jha, were his early teachers. Subsequently, he learnt Dhrupad, Dhamar, Khayal, Thumri, Dadra, Tappa style of Hindustani classical from Pt. Bholanath Bhatt, while living at his ashram in Allahabad for 25 years. He also trained from B.N. Thakar of Allahabad and Habib Khan of Kirana gharana.

== Achievements ==
Among the first to notice Jha-sahab's magnificent compositions and parlay them was the famous maestro, the late Jitendra Abhisheki, who sang and taught Ramrang's many compositions.

In 1968, he was appointed to the faculty of Allahabad University and later in 1980 promoted to the position of Head of the Music Department. This move by the university was in recognition of genuine merit because Ramrang held no formal college degrees. He retired from his active professorial duties in 1989.

In 2005, Ramrang received the Sangeet Natak Akademi Award from Sangeet Natak Akademi, India's National Academy for Music, Dance and Drama. Ramrang died 1 January 2009, in Kolkata, India, due to complications following heart surgery.

Among his well-known disciples are Vidushi Kamla Bose, Shubha Mudgal, Kamala Bose Late Dr.Geeta Banerjee and Indrani Mukherjee. .

== Works ==
- Abhinav Geetanjali Vol. 1 to 5 (Hindi), Sangeet Sadan Prakashan. 2022. ASIN:B00LEAPI66.
