= Atrauli =

- Town
- Location in Uttar Pradesh, India Atrauli (India)
- Coordinates: 28.03°N 78.28°E
- Country: India
- State: Uttar Pradesh
- District: Aligarh

Population (2011)
  - Total: 50,412

Language
  - Official: Hindi
  - Additional official: Urdu
- Time zone: UTC+5:30 (IST)
- PIN: 202280
- Vehicle registration: UP-81

Atrauli is a town and a municipal board in Aligarh district in the state of Uttar Pradesh, India. Situated on the bank of the river Ganges, Atrauli is around 27 km (17 mi) from Aligarh and 52 km (32 mi) from Khair.

== Etymology ==
The town is named after the sage Atri Muni who is believed to have visited the town. The town was earlier known as Atravali (अत्रावली), which later had been colloquially altered to Atrauli (अतरौली).

== History ==
During the 18th century Rao Durjan Singh Punia of Bijauli took possession of Atrauli.

== Geography ==
Atrauli is located at 28.029°N 78.286°E. It has an average elevation of 136 metres (446 feet). It is located . Also, Atrauli is in the plains of Ganga-Yamuna Doab, located at the right bank of the Ganges.

== Demographics ==
At the 2011 census, Atrauli had a population of 50,412, of which 26,368 were males and 24,044 were females. Atrauli has an average literacy rate of 47.5%, with 53.4% of the males and 41.1% of females literate. Population in the age range of 0 to 6 years was 7,254. The Scheduled Castes and Scheduled Tribes have a population of 4,568 and 2 respectively. Atrauli had 8093 household in 2011.

== Notable people ==
- Nanua Chaprasi, Hindu spiritual guru and saint.
- Chandra Bhanu Gupta, Ex-Chief Minister of Uttar Pradesh.
- Khadim Hussain Khan, Indian classical singer of Agra gharana.
- Sharafat Hussain Khan, Indian classical music singer.
- Ustad Alladiya Khan, founder of the Jaipur-Atrauli gharana school of music.
- Ravikant Nagaich, Hindi film director.
- Gulveer Singh, Indian long distance runner, Asian Games 2022 Medalist.
- Kalyan Singh, Two-time Chief Minister of Uttar Pradesh, former member of Lok Sabha, former governor of Himachal Pradesh and of Rajasthan.
- Sandeep Kumar Singh, Minister of State, Basic Education (Independent Charge), Uttar Pradesh
- Ashok Singhal, National President of Vishwa Hindu Parishad
