= Ramnathi =

Hindu temple in Goa, India

Coordinates: 15.398783°N 73.981504°E

The Ramnathi Temple is located in Ramnathim, Bandivade in Goa. The primary worshippers come from the social classes Goud Saraswat Brahmins (GSB) belonging to Gokarn Math, & Kashi Mutt, Daivadnya Brahmin and Vaishyas. Similar to other Goan Brahmin temples, Ramnathi too incorporates the system of Panchayatan, therefore, this temple houses 5 main deities namely; Shri Ramnath (chief deity), Shanteri, Kamakshi, Laxmi Narayan, Ganapati, Betal and Kalbhairav, along with other family purushas.

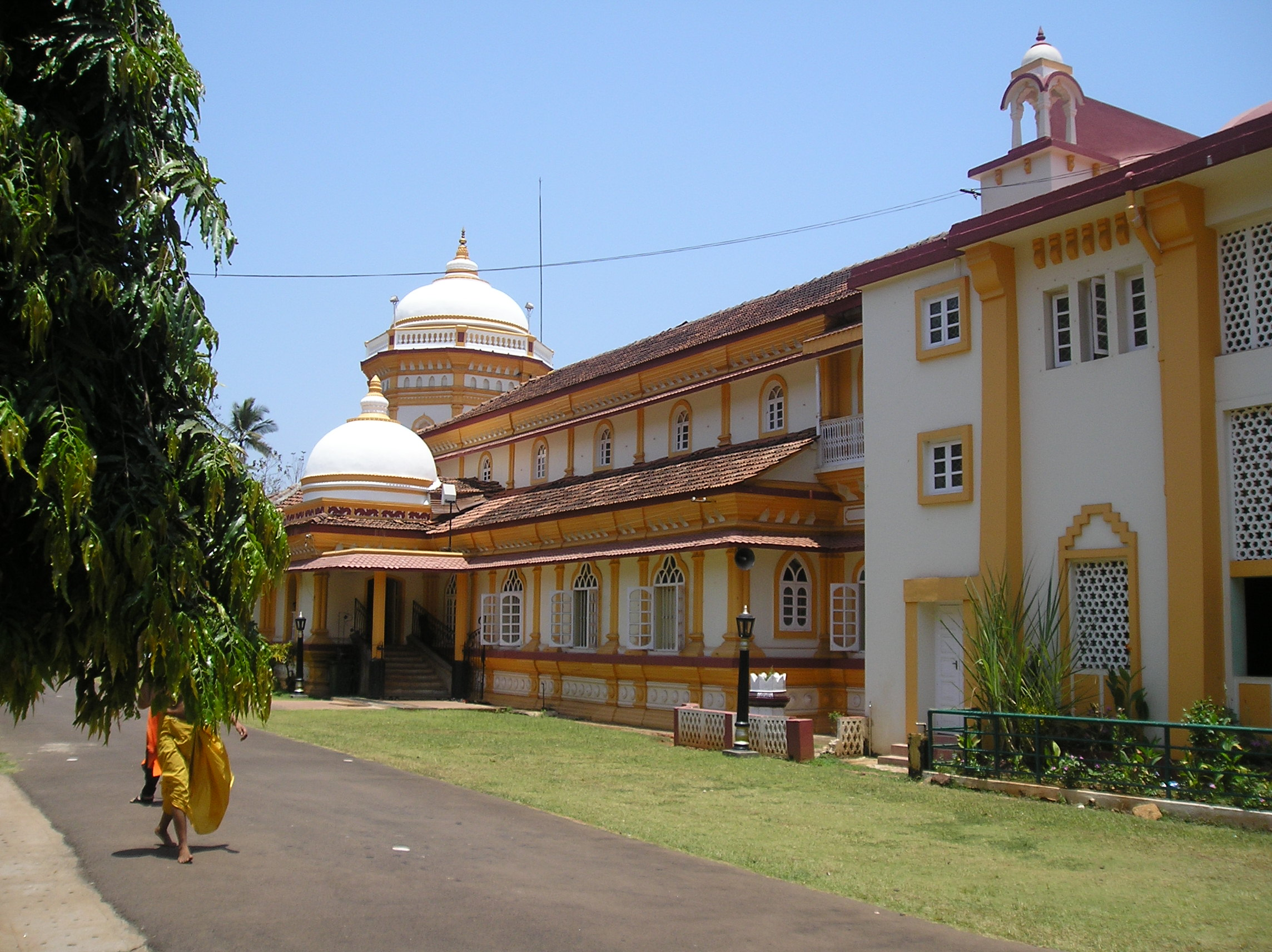
Ramnathi temple, Goa, India

== Legend ==
Local Hindus believe the Ramanath idol to have originally been installed by Rama at Rameshwar. When Rama came back from Lanka along with Sita, after killing Ravana, he decided to pray to Shiva in order to absolve him of killing a Brahmin. Hence, a lingam was installed, and Rama prayed to it. Shiva is regarded to have emerged from the idol and sent Rama to Guru Gorakshnath. There are 12 Panths, and one of the Panths started from Rama. This came to be known as Ramnath.

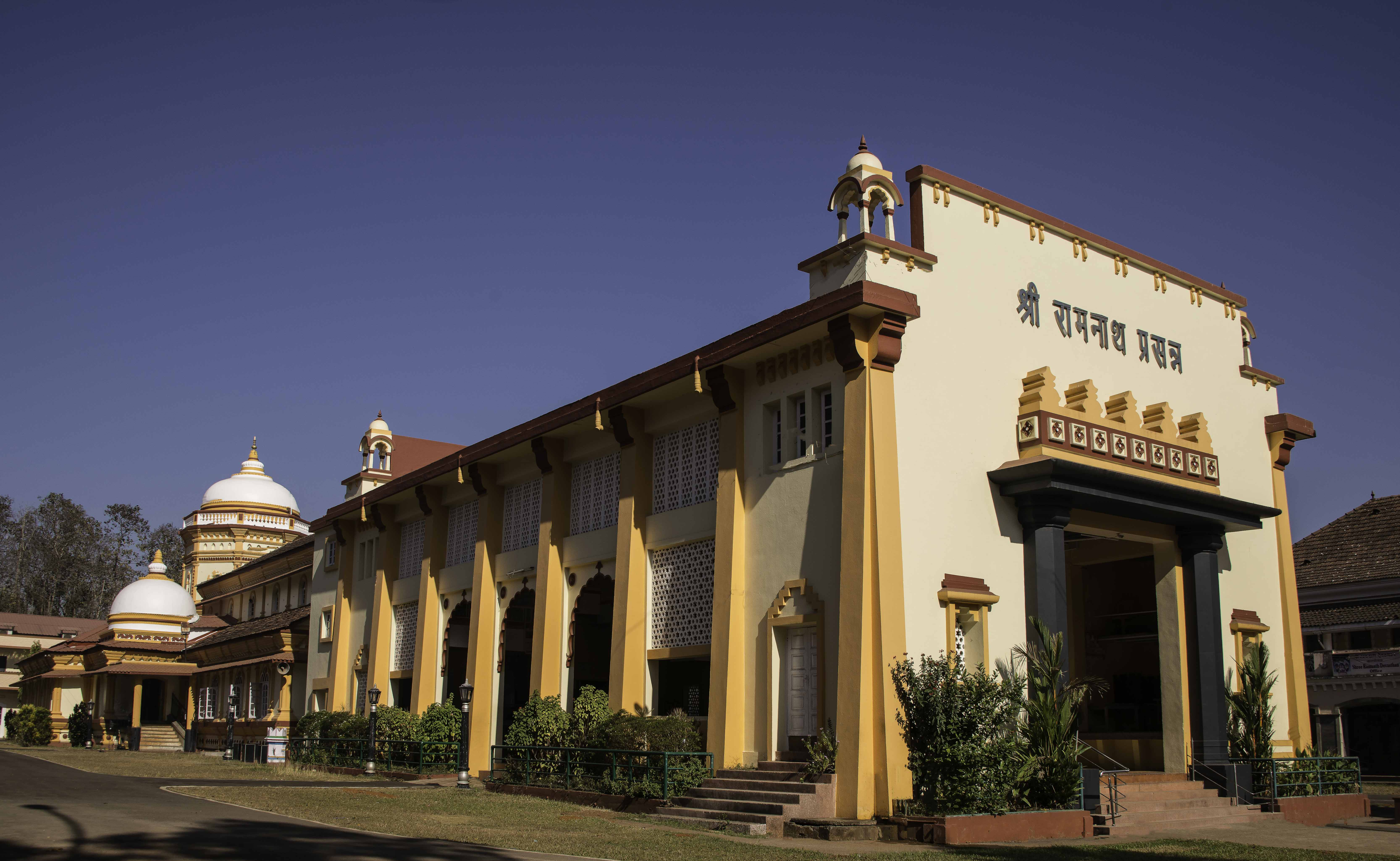
Entrance of Shri Ramnathi Temple.

== History ==
The original temple of Ramnathi in Goa, was located in Loutolim in salcette (सष्टी), Goa. The Idol of Ramnathi was shifted to the present site in the 16th century to prevent its destruction by the then Portuguese colonizers. In May 2011, the Ramnathi temple completed 450 years at its present location.

According to tradition, Ramnath is a Shaivite deity (Shivadaivat). The origin of the deity is connected to Rama, who installed a Shivalinga at Rameswaram to cleanse the sin of brahmahatya incurred after killing Ravana.

In ancient times, Saraswat Brahmins belonging to the Vatsa and Kaundinya gotras settled in the village of Loutolim in Salcete, Goa. They brought the idol of their family deity (kuladev), Shri Ramnath, and enshrined it in a local temple alongside idols of Shri Laxminarayan, Shri Shantadurga (Santer), Betal, and Siddhanath. After individual temples were erected for all five deities, the area became known as "Deulwada".

Following the 16th-century Portuguese conquest of Goa, Portuguese authorities began forced religious conversions and the destruction of Hindu temples. In 1566 CE, the villagers of Loutolim migrated with their deities to Bandora in the Antruz Mahal region, which was then under the rule of the Bijapur Sultanate. Upon settling in Bandora, the community prospered in trade and commerce and constructed five separate temples to house the five deities.

Due to the deterioration of these older structures, a major reconstruction was undertaken in 1905 CE, resulting in the building of new, larger temples.

== Architecture and temple complex ==
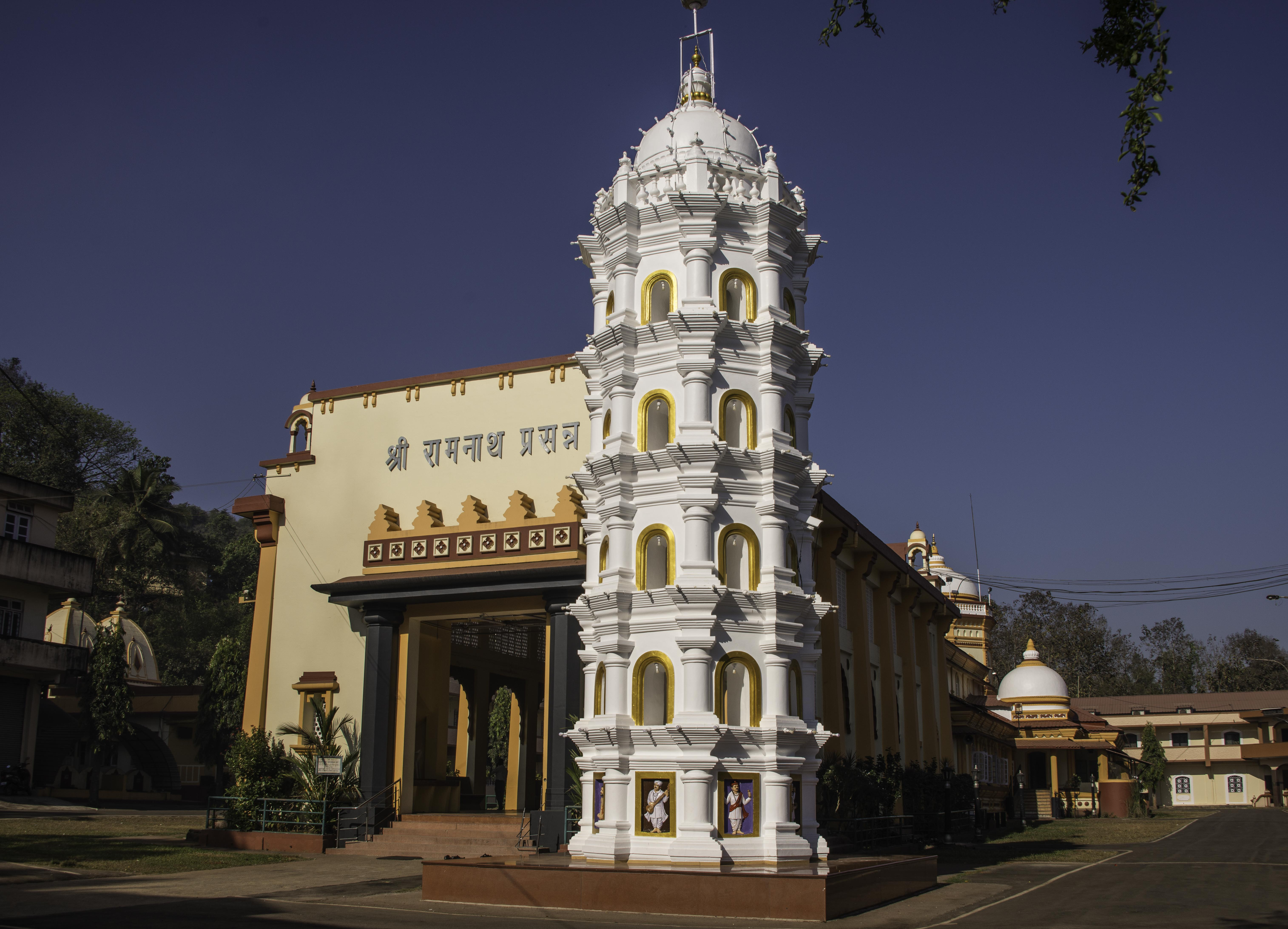
Main entrance and Deepa stambha

The main temple complex houses multiple shrines arranged in a specific layout:

- Central shrine: Contains an idol of Laxminarayan carved from black stone installed on an elevated platform, with the Ramnath Shivalinga in the center and a statue of Nandi situated nearby.
- Left side: Houses the shrines dedicated to Ramnath and Shantadurga (the village deity of Loutolim).
- Right side: Houses the temple of Kamakshi. Inside the sanctum of the right-side temple, Shantadurga is installed, with Siddhanath placed outside the sanctum to her right.
- Ramnath shrine: Siddhanath is enshrined within the Ramnath temple itself.
- Courtyard: Contains smaller shrines dedicated to Betal and Kalbhairav. Because the original Betal and Kalbhairav shrines remained structurally sturdy during the 1905 renovation, they were preserved in their original form and later restored.

The spatial arrangement of the deities gives the complex an appearance similar to the Hariharesheshwar pilgrimage site of South India.

The complex features rest houses (agrashalas) situated on both sides and behind the main structure, as well as an assembly hall (sabhagruh). A drum tower (nagarhana) was constructed in 1934, followed by the addition of a large temporary assembly hall (sabhamaṇṭap) in 1951.

== Deities ==
Lord Ramnath

The chief deity of the temple is Ramnath. Since Ramnath is the chief deity, the temple came to be known as Ramnathi. The name Ram-Nath equals Lord of Rama i.e. Shiva. In addition the temple has the idols of the Goddess Shanteri (Shantadurga) from Rivona and the Goddess Kamakshi from Loutolim. There is an idol of Shree Lakshmi Narayan Shree Siddhinath (Ganesh), Shree Betal and Shree Kaalbhairav. This completes the Ramnathi Panchayatna.

== Festivals ==
The most prominent event at Ramnathi is the Mahashivratri festival, celebrated during the Hindu month of Magha, running from Magha Krishna 12 to Phalguna (Shigmo) Shukla 2. Features of the festival include:

- Processions (miravani) of the deities carried in various palanquins (lalarvi, palarvi), float rafts (sangod), and other vehicles over four to five days.
- Chariot processions (rathotsav) of Ramnath held at dawn and in the evening on the day following Shivratri.

Regular palanquin processions for Ramnath take place every Monday, as well as on Akshaya Tritiya and Dasara. Palanquin processions for Laxminarayan are held on every Panchami (except during Chaturmas), while those for Shantadurga and Kamakshi occur on every Amavasya.

Other major annual observances include:

- Re-consecration anniversary: Held on Phalguna Dasami to commemorate the re-installation (purna-pratishtha) of the deities, featuring afternoon feasts (samaradhana and santarpan) and evening events including a procession of four deities, float rafts (sangod), and a festival of lights (deepotsav).
- Shigmo and Navratri: A grand palanquin procession takes place on Rangapanchami during Shigmo, and Navratri is celebrated annually.

== Patronage ==
The lineage followers (kulavis) and patrons (mahajans) of the Ramnath temple are Saraswat Brahmins bearing the surname Shenai (Shenvi), residing primarily across Goa, Mumbai, Rajkot, and South Karnataka.

The kulavis or associated families had migrated out of Salcete due to religious persecution and now dwell all along the western coast of India. A large number of the kulavis live in Goa, Mumbai, coastal Karnataka, Kerala and abroad. The tradition of coming to the temple after a major family event continues.

The kulavis mainly come from Vatsa, KaundinyaGotra of Madhwa follower Gaud Saraswat Brahmins and of Daivadnya Brahmins samaj.
