= Gajananrao Joshi =

Gajanan A. Joshi
- Birth name: Gajanan Anant Joshi
- Also known as: Gajananbuwa Joshi
- Born: January 30, 1911; Aundh State, British India
- Died: 28 June 1987 (aged 76)
- Genres: Hindustani classical music, Khayal, Bhajan
- Occupation: Indian Classical Vocalist
- Instrument(s): Hindustani classical musician, Vocalist, Violin
- Years active: 1930–1987

Gajanan Anant Joshi, better known as "Gajananbuwa Joshi", (January 30, 1911 – June 28, 1987) was an Indian vocalist and violinist in the field of Hindustani music.

== Early life and background ==
Gajananrao Joshi came from a family of musicians. His grandfather Manohar had studied dhrupad and dhamar, and his father Anant Manohar Joshi (known as Antu-buwa Joshi) was a khayal singer who had studied under Balakrishnabuwa Ichalkaranjikar.

Gajananbuwa studied gayaki (singing style) of the Gwalior gharana under his father and also under other teachers in whom he found something to learn, and assimilated other styles in his art. His other gurus were Vazebuwa of Gwalior gharana, Vilayat Hussein Khan from Agra gharana, Bhurji Khan from Jaipur-Atrauli gharana and Vinayakrao Ghangrekar for tabla.

== Career ==
Joshi's students include vocalist and violinist Madhukar Joshi, Arun Kashalkar, Vikas Kashalkar, Ulhas Kashalkar, Padma Talwalkar, and violinist Shridhar Parsekar. He also taught vocalists Kaushalya Manjeshwar, Shubhada Paradkar, Veena Sahasrabuddhe, Kalpana Mujumdar (nee Deshpande) and Jayashree Patanekar. His daughter Malati (Malu-tai) and sons Manohar, Madhukar and Narayan are also trained musicians. His sons variously took to singing, violin, and tabla. His daughter Sucheta Bidkar (nee Malutai Joshi) taught music at SNDT College. His son Manohar (known as Bachchu-bhai Joshi) formed Shivanand Trust which organizes the annual music festival at Aundh, near Satara. His granddaughters Apoorva Gokhale and Pallavi Joshi are also well-known singers.

Buwa worked as a Professor of Music at the Faculty of Music, University of Mumbai in 1970.

He also worked as a Music Advisor to All India Radio from 1956 to 1968 at the Mumbai, Indore and Lucknow Radio Stations.

His autobiography and his compositions for violin written by him was published in the form of a book by the renowned Mouj Publishing House in Mumbai.

== Awards and honours ==
Gajananbuwa was invited to participate in almost all the major music conferences, festivals and events all over India. In addition he was also invited to go to Nepal and Pakistan for music programmes.

Buwa received the following prestigious awards for his contribution to Indian classical music both as a violinist and a vocalist:

Sangeet Natak Akademi Award in 1972.

An award given in 1982 by the ITC Sangeet Research Academy, a Trust promoted by ITC Limited, Calcutta.

Tansen Samman given by the Government of Madhya Pradesh in 1985.
