= Khadim Hussain Khan =

Indian singer (1907–1993)

- Born: 1907; Atrauli, United Provinces of Agra and Oudh, British India
- Died: 11 January 1993 (aged 85–86)
- Occupation: Singer
- Style: Indian classical music; agra gharana

Khadim Hussain Khan (1907 – 11 January 1993) was an Indian classical music singer.

== Early life ==
Khadim Hussain Khan was born in Atrauli, United Provinces of Agra and Oudh, in 1907. Initiated into music by his father, Altaf Hussain Khan, he went on to learn from his grand uncle Ustad Kallan Khan. They were both court musicians of the Jaipur Kingdom in present-day Rajasthan, India.

== Career ==
Khan settled in Bombay in the late 1920s and was associated with musical life in Mumbai for several decades. He was a capable performer, with the ability to show forth the unique features of the agra gharana style of singing and all its eight angs. However, it was as a music teacher that he will be remembered by. Although he had been a broadcaster since the inception of All India Radio (AIR), he made teaching music his life's mission. Among his students are Ustad Latafat Hussain Khan, Saguna Kalyanpur, Lalith J. Rao and Babanrao Haldankar.

He also was a composer of bandishes and taranas under the nom-de-plume of "Sajan Piya". A number of his compositions are still used by agra gharana performers today. He composed a number of bhajans as well.

== Death ==
Khan died on 11 January 1993, aged 86.

== Awards ==
- Maharashtra State Award (1978)
- Sangeet Natak Akademi Award (1978)
- Padma Bhushan award by the Government of India (1982)
- Tansen Samman award by the Government of Madhya Pradesh (1986)
