= Jitendra Abhisheki =

Indian singer and composer (1929–1998)

Pandit Jitendra Abhisheki
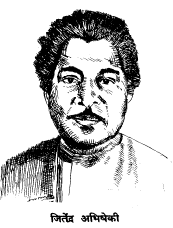

Background information
- Born: Ganesh Balawant Nawathe; 21 September 1929; Mangeshi, Goa, Portuguese India
- Died: 7 November 1998 (aged 69) Pune, Maharashtra, India
- Genres: Classical, semi-classical, devotional, musical theatre
- Occupations: Singer, composer, musicologist, music teacher
- Years active: 1950s–1998
- Website: jitendraabhisheki.com

Ganesh Balawant Nawathe (21 September 1929 – 7 November 1998), popularly known as Pandit Jitendra Abhisheki, was an Indian vocalist, composer, scholar, and teacher of Indian classical, semi-classical, and devotional music. Primarily associated with Hindustani music, he was noted for his mastery of diverse musical forms, including Thumri, Tappa, Bhajan, and Bhavageet.

Abhisheki's musical style reflected influences from multiple gharanas, particularly the Agra gharana, Jaipur-Atrauli gharana, and Khurja gharana, which he synthesised into a distinctive vocal approach. He is credited with reviving and reshaping Marathi musical theatre (Natya Sangeet) in the 1960s through his influential compositions and musical direction for Marathi stage productions. Over a career spanning three decades, Abhisheki recorded several music albums, composed music for more than 25 Marathi musical productions, and performed extensively in India as well as in Europe and the United States. He was also recognised as a respected guru who trained several prominent disciples in Hindustani music, contributing significantly to the continuation of his musical legacy.

Abhisheki received several honours for his contributions to Indian classical music and Marathi musical theatre, including the Padma Shri in 1988 and the Sangeet Natak Akademi Award in 1989. An annual Pandit Jitendra Abhisheki Mahotsav is held, and the last was held in mid-October 2018 at the Yashwantrao Chavan Natyagruha in Kothrud, Maharashtra. In Goa, a Pandit Jitendra Abhisheki Music Festival held at the local Kala Academy also reached its 20th edition in 2026.

== Early life and training ==
Abhisheki was born in a priestly Padye Karhade Brahmin family in village Mangeshi, Goa. His family was traditionally attached to the Mangeshi Temple of Shiva. His father, Balawantrao (also known as Bhikambhat), was a temple priest, kirtankar (performer of kirtan form of devotional music), and a half-brother of Deenanath Mangeshkar, making Abhisheki related to the Mangeshkar family. Balawantrao taught Jitendra the basic principles of Hindustani classical music. Thereafter he started his formal musical training under Girijabai Kelekar from the neighbouring village of Bandora and sister of Marathi stage singer and actress, Jyotsna Bhole. He passed his matriculation examination in 1949 and followed it with a degree in Sanskrit literature.

He left for Mumbai (then Bombay), where he continued his formal musical training in vocal music from Jagannathbuwa Purohit “Gunidas" of Agra Gharana, and Gullubhai Jasdanwala of Jaipur Gharana, whose influences later shaped his distinctive musical style.

Abhisheki was also well known for his renditions of his Marathi Natya Sangeet compositions like "Guntatā hr̥dayā he" (गुंतता हृदया हे), "He surānno candra vhā" (हे सुरांनो चंद्र व्हा) and other songs/Marathi ghazals such as "Kaivalyācā" (कैवल्याचा), "Sarvātmaka sarveśvara", "Kaṭā rūte kuṇālā" (कटा रूते कुणाला), "Mājhe jīvanā gāṇe" (माझे जीवना गाणे), etc.

== Career ==
He began his career with All India Radio (AIR) in Mumbai, where he came into contact with several prominent musicians including Ravi Shankar, who was music director at AIR. This helped Abhisheki gain opportunities to showcase his musical abilities by composing pieces for radio programmes. Around this time, he received a Government of India scholarship for advanced training in Hindustani classical music under Azmat Hussain Khan of Khurja Gharana. He went on to develop a distinct style of Khayal singing and earned recognition in Marathi Natya Sangeet as well as devotional genres such as bhajan and abhang. From the early 1960s onward, he established a distinct place for himself in the post-independence era of Hindustani music, a period which was marked by the presence music stalwarts like Bhimsen Joshi, Kumar Gandharva, Mallikarjun Mansur and Jasraj.

A prolific composer, Abhisheki composed the padas and songs performed live in the acclaimed Marathi play Katyar Kaljat Ghusali (1967). His music was later adapted for the film adaptation of the play, released in 2015. His compositions for plays such as Yayati Devyani, Hey Bandh Reshamache, Lekurachi Hoshiyari, and Matsyagandha also became widely popular. xpanding beyond traditional Hindustani ragas, he incorporated Western musical elements into the opera Lekure Udand Jhali, which was staged in the style of a Broadway musical and ran for over 1,000 performances.

After receiving a Homi Bhabha Fellowship for 1969–1971 to conduct research in Hindustani music, during this period Abhisheki taught at a music school in the United States run by sitarist Ravi Shankar. He featured in the double studio album, Ravi Shankar's Festival from India (1968), and in 1974, he toured internationally with a group of musicians as part of the Ravi Shankar's Music Festival from India.

Abhisheki maintained close ties with his native Goa through his association with the Kala Academy, where he mentored and guided students from the state. He also wrote extensively on Hindustani classical music and served as an adviser to several organisations, including All India Radio.

== Musical style and influences ==
Abhisheki's musical style was shaped by training under musicians belonging to several gharanas, including the Agra gharana, Jaipur-Atrauli gharana, Khurja gharana, and influences from the Patiala gharana. In addition to learning from his principal gurus, he learnt several ragas from Ustad Bade Gulam Ali Khan of Patiala gharana, He also studied compositions from vocalists such as Nivruttibuwa Sarnaik and Ratnakar Pai of Jaipur-Atrauli gharana, reflecting his continuing interest in learning from diverse musical traditions. Continuing his musical training well into the 1960s, he travelled to Allahabad to study compositions under noted music scholar and composer Ramashreya Jha “Ramrang.” Subsequently whose composition he included in his concert repertoire, along with compositions of another noted composer and khyal singer C. R. Vyas. Unlike many male Hindustani vocalists of his generation, Abhisheki also became recognised for his performances of thumri, developing an individual approach to the semi-classical form.

Owing to his extensive training across multiple traditions, gharanas, he became proficient in the styles of the Agra gharana, Jaipur-Atrauli gharana, and Khurja gharana. In time, he became known for synthesising influences from multiple gharanas and musical traditions into a distinctive personal style, sometimes referred as Abhisheki Gayaki. Music critics have noted that although Abhisheki drew extensively from diverse musical traditions, he developed a distinctive individual style rather than adhering rigidly to a single gharana.

His performances were noted for their emphasis on the gradual development of a raga through alaap rather than through sargam, which he regarded as central to Hindustani classical music. In Marathi musical theatre, Abhisheki is credited with shortening the duration of songs from the traditional 15–20 minutes, suited to classical mehfil (musical gathering) performances, to around five minutes to better serve theatrical storytelling, as he believed songs in theatre should remain functional to the narrative. Music scholars have described Abhisheki as a pioneering reformer of modern Natya Sangeet, noting that his compositions introduced new melodic structures and a more compact theatrical format while retaining the classical foundation of Marathi musical theatre.

Abhisheki was known for encouraging his disciples to develop an individual musical identity rather than merely imitate their guru's style. His son and disciple Shounak Abhisheki later recalled that one of his father's earliest lessons was the importance of cultivating a distinct aesthetic approach to music through continuous listening and learning.

== Personal life ==
Abhisheki spent much of his career in Mumbai and later settled in Pune, where he trained a number of disciples. He died on 7 November 1998 at his residence in Pune following a prolonged illness related to diabetes, for which he had previously been hospitalised. He was survived by his wife, Vidya Abhisheki, his son Shounak Abhisheki, a classical vocalist, and a daughter, Mekhala Khadikar nee Abhisheki.

His wife, Vidya Abhisheki, whom he married in 1969 and who also managed his music gurukul, died on 5 April 2024.

== Legacy ==
Abhisheki is regarded as an influential figure in post-independence Hindustani music and is particularly credited with revitalising Natya Sangeet by simplifying complex classical compositions for theatrical performance while retaining their musical depth. Several prominent vocalists trained under him, including Shubha Mudgal, Devaki Pandit, Asha Khadilkar, Mahesh Kale, and his son Shounak Abhisheki. The Pandit Jitendra Abhisheki Sangeet Mahotsav is organised annually in his memory in, since 2004, in Goa. It marks his birth anniversary on September 21, and attracts performances by noted singers from across India.

=== Teaching style and students ===
Throughout his career he taught several students as a part of guru-shishya parampara and for free, many who became noted musicians in their own right. He would start his morning riaz in kharaj (lower octave) around 3:45 am along with his students. Abhisheki's teaching methods placed considerable emphasis on voice development, expanding vocal range, and systematic practice of ragas and bandishes, aspects later documented by his disciple Mohankumar Darekar in a biographical work on the musician.

Besides son Shounak Abhisheki, Abhisheki's well-known musical disciples include Asha Khadilkar, Devaki Pandit, Shubha Mudgal, Mohankumar Darekar, Jeevan Dharmadhikari, Hemant Pendse, Ajit Kadkade, Raja Kale, Prabhakar Karekar, Vijay Koparkar, Sameer Dublay, Dr. Hrishikesh Majumdar and Dr Mrs Madhuri Joshi, Pt. Sudhakar Deoley of Ujjain, Mahesh Kale.

== Awards and recognitions ==
- Homi Bhabha Fellowship (1969)
- Natyadarpan Award (1978)
- Padma Shri (1988)
- Sangeet Natak Akademi Award (1989)
- Maharashtra Gaurav Puraskar (1990)
- Gomantak Marathi Academy Award (1992)
- Balgandharva Award (1995)
- Surashree Kesarbai Kerkar Award (1996)
- Master Deenanath Smriti Award (1996)
- Lata Mangeshkar Award (1996)
- Balgandharva Award (Natyaparishad, 1997)
- Saraswati Award (Kailas Math, Nasik, 1997)

== Bibliography ==
- Dr. Mohan Darekar (2010). Maze Jeevan Gane (माझे जीवन गाणे) (in Marathi). Madhushree Prakashan. ASIN B099225HKM.
- Dr. Mohankumar Darekar (tr.) (2004). "Pandit Jitendra Abhisheki: A Life Dedicated to Music".
- Mukund, Shaila (2024). Abhisheki (Marathi). Rajhans Prakashan. ISBN 9789390324491.
