= Babanrao Haldankar =

- Born: Srikrishna Babanrao Haldankar; 1927; India
- Died: 17 November 2016 (aged 89)
- Genres: Singer; composer

Srikrishna Haldankar (29 September 1927 – 17 November 2016), better known as Babanrao Haldankar, was an Indian classical singer, composer, and music teacher of Agra gharana of Hindustani classical music.

== Life and career ==
Babanrao Haldankar was the son of painter Sawlaram Haldankar (1882–1968), and has won awards through his career. and was an adjunct professor of Indian Music at the University of Mumbai.

== Education ==
He had studied under Jaipur Gharana's doyenne Mogubai Kurdikar in 1950s but had a preference for Agra Gharana. Accordingly, he switched to Ustad Khadim Hussain of Agra gharana, who settled in Mumbai from Jaipur, in 1959, and studied under him for 20 years. Babanrao Haldankar himself was a much sought after guru, and he taught many of the prominent artists coming up towards the end of 20th Century, including Pt.Arun Kashalkar, Shubhada Paradkar, Devaki Pandit and Pournima Dhumale, Dr.Sandhya Kathavate.

== Works ==
- Babanrao Haldankar (2001). Aesthetics of Agra and Jaipur Traditions. Padmaja Punde (trans.). Popular Prakashan. ISBN 978-81-7154-685-5.

== Bibliography ==
- Jeffrey Michael Grimes (2008). The Geography of Hindustani Music: The Influence of Region and Regionalism on the North Indian Classical Tradition. ISBN 978-1-109-00342-0.
