= Vilayat Hussain Khan =

Indian classical Agra Gharana singer

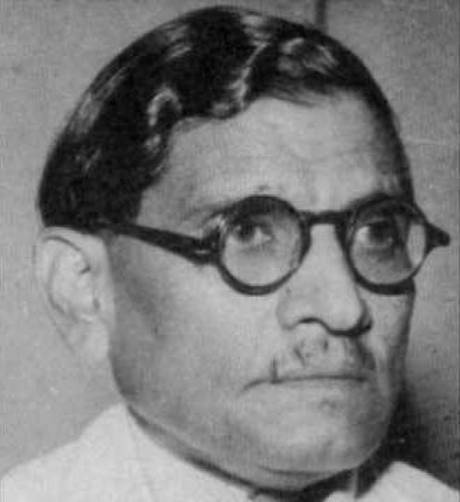

Background information
- Born: Vilayat Hussain Khan; 1895
- Died: 1962 (aged 66–67)
- Genre: Indian classical music
- Occupations: Composer, vocalist

Ustad Vilayat Hussain Khan (1895–1962) was an Indian classical singer and teacher belonging to the Agra gharana (singing style).

Vilayat composed bandishes in many ragas under the pen name "Pran Piya".

== Training ==
Vilayat Khan received his early training in Hindustani classical music from his father Nathan Khan. After his father's death, he was trained by his uncles Kallan Khan and Mohammad Baksh. He was also trained by the renowned musician Faiyaz Khan (Aftab-e-Mausiqui) or (Sun of Music).

== Students ==
His students include Mogubai Kurdikar, Yashpaul, Jagannathbuwa Purohit, Menaka Shirodkar (mother of Shobha Gurtu), Ratnakant Ramnathkar, Ram Marathe, Gajananrao Joshi and Girija Kelekar. His son Yunus Hussain Khan was a prominent name in Agra Gharana as well.
