= Chandra Nath Shastri =

Chandra Nath Shastri চন্দ্রনাথ শাস্ত্রী
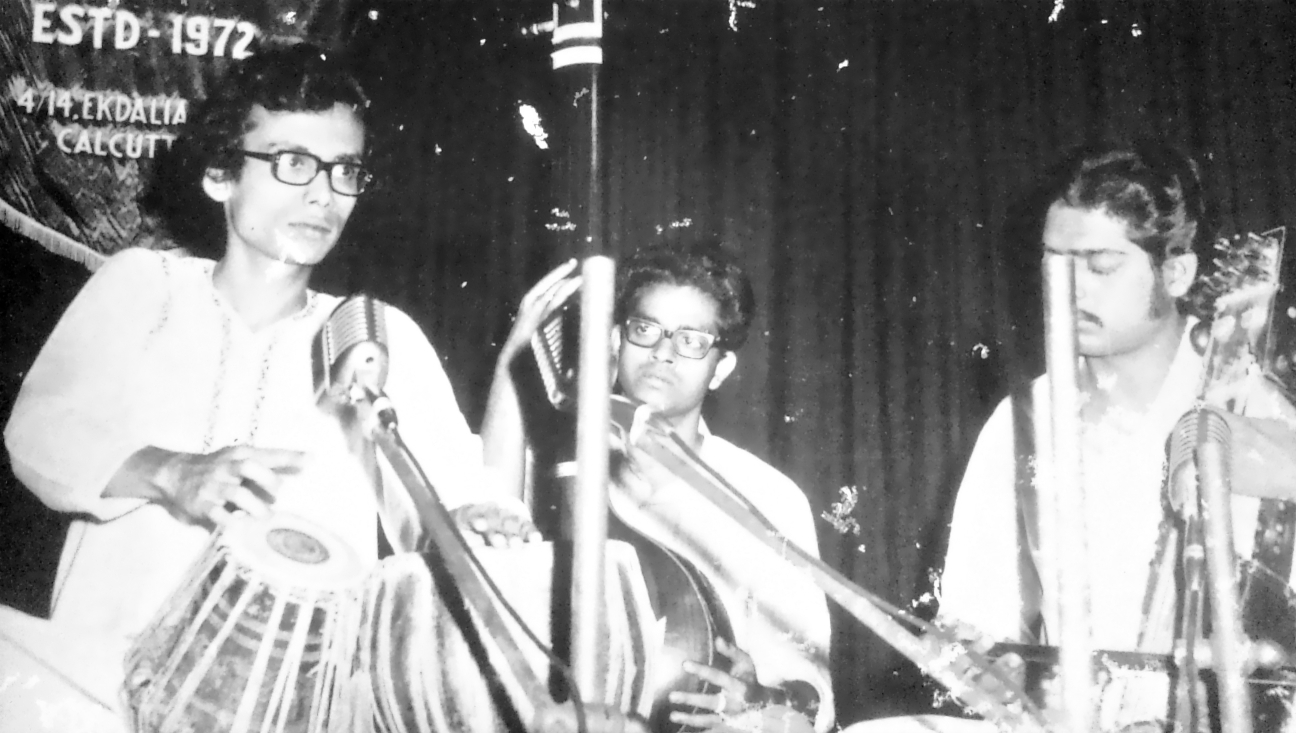
- Chandra with Tabla

Background information
- Born: Chandra Nath shastri 23 December 1948 (age 77)
- Origin: Calcutta, West Bengal, India
- Genres: Hindustani classical music, Benares gharana
- Occupation: Classical musician
- Instruments: Tablā, Khol, Mridangam
- Years active: 1960–present
- Website: Official website

Pandit Chandra Nath Shastri (Bengali: চন্দ্রনাথ শাস্ত্রী, Hindi: चंद्रनाथ शास्त्री, 23 December 1948), is a tabla (Indian hand percussion) musician from India, currently based in Kolkata. He belongs to the Benares gharana style of Hindustani classical music. He is a retired staff artist of All India Radio and performed regularly for public-television broadcaster Doordarshan. He is also an astrologer.

== Early life and family ==
He was born in the Dhakuria area of Calcutta (now Kolkata), West Bengal, in a Bramhin family. Soon his parents and family relocated to Varanasi (a.k.a. Banaras, Benares, Benaras), Uttar Pradesh (UP), where he undertook training in the Benares gharana style. He was influenced by poet and lyricist Rabindra Nath Tagore. His grandmother, Smt. Indira Devi was niece of Rabindra Nath Tagore. His father, Mouli Nath Shastri, was a physician but he was also a spiritual guru and musician (tabla player), vocal student of Rabindra Nath Tagore, and had directed and acted in theatre (Muktisnan, 1937; Sancharini, 1963).

== Academics ==
Shastri completed his intermediate schooling at C. M. Anglo Bengali Inter College, Varanasi, UP. He then graduated in science from Banaras Hindu University, Varanasi.

== Musical career ==
Shastri's father noted his interest in Hindustani classical music from a very young age and taught him to play some taals on tabla. At age 5 Shastri began learning from his guruji, Pandit Anokhelal Mishra of Banaras, and later from his son, Ramji Mishra. Shastri and his elder brother, Nath Shastri, would go to AnokhelalJi to learn tabla. Shastri became a fifth-generation tabla maestro of Benares gharana. As a young teenager he became close to Mahadev Prasad Mishra, Kishan Maharaj, Samta Prasad, Sarda Sahai, and Karamatullah Khan.

Chandra Nath Shastri became the champion in an All India Radio (AIR) national competition at age 23, and from a young age was often referred to by the title pandit. He became an AIR staff artist, Indian National Television Channel (Doordarshan) artist and also a stage performing artist. As a regular performer on TV, radio and stage, he has made several thousand performances and recordings.

=== Performances ===
Shastri has performed in many concerts, including tabla solos, percussion ensembles, and accompanied with instrumentalists and vocalists, and worked with numerous music composers and film directors. He also performed with Mahadev Prasad Mishra, V. G. Jog, Sagiruddin Khan, Rashid Khan, Lalmani Misra, and Buddhadev Das Gupta.

Shastri judged many musical competitions and talent-hunt contests. He conducted research in Indian music and produced unique works on music, especially in the field of tabla. He also plays Pakhawaj, Khol, Mridangam and other Indian percussion instruments.

== Personal life ==
Shastri teaches tabla and other musical instruments, and has taught in many music schools, academies and institutes.

Shastri also studies spirituality. He is also an astrologer.

== See also ==
- Anokhelal Mishra
- Kishan Maharaj
- Samta Prasad
- Shankar Ghosh
- Zakir Hussain
- Anindo Chatterjee
- Swapan Chaudhuri
- Ashutosh Bhattacharya
- Kumar Bose
- Yogesh Samsi
