= Shankar Ghosh (musician) =

Indian tabla player (1935–2016)

Pandit Shankar Ghosh
- Born: 10 October 1935
- Died: 22 January 2016 (aged 80)
- Genre: Hindustani classical music
- Occupation: percussionist
- Instrument: Tabla
- Years active: 1960s - 2016
- Spouse: Sanjukta Ghosh

Pandit Shankar Ghosh (10 October 1935 – 22 January 2016) was an Indian Tabla player and teacher from the Farukhabad gharana of Hindustani classical music. He has revolutionized both the art of Tabla solo playing as well as Tabla accompaniment. His many compositions have become an intrinsic part of the contemporary Tabla repertoire.

He was awarded the 1999–2000 Sangeet Natak Akademi Award in Tabla, the highest Indian recognition given to practicing artists, by Sangeet Natak Akademi, India's National Academy of Music, Dance and Drama.

== Early life and training ==
He started learning training taleem in 1953 under Jnan Prakash Ghosh of Calcutta (now Kolkata), who pioneered the concept of tabla ensembles, which employed numerous tabla players playing the same pieces; a tradition later taken forward by Shankar himself.

== Career ==
He started touring the US in the 1960s with sarod maestro Ustad Ali Akbar Khan and won rave reviews, and over the years he toured with Pandit Ravi Shankar, Ustad Vilayat Khan, Pandit Nikhil Banerjee, Sharan Rani, and Pandit V. G. Jog. In India he has performed with vocalists such as Ustad Bade Ghulam Ali Khan, Pandit Omkarnath Thakur, Pandit Vinayakrao Patwardhan, Girija Devi and Smt. Akhtari Bai. During his stay abroad he also collaborated with artists like Greg Ellis, Pete Lockett and John Bergamo.

He has received awards like ITC Sangeet Research Academy award and the Ustad Hafiz Ali Khan award. Teaching tabla for over three decades, he has taught in institutions at Kolkata, Paris and Bonn.

During his 10-year' stay at the Ali Akbar College of Music, California, he collaborated with western classical and fusion giants and created immense impact worldwide. He is the pioneer of the all-drum orchestra,"Music of the Drums", that was staged at the closing ceremony of Asiad'82 and at the Royal Albert Hall, London for the BBC PROMS 100th year celebrations.

== Personal life ==
He was married to the Hindustani classical vocalist of Patiala gharana, Sanjukta Ghosh, and was the father of the tabla maestro Bickram Ghosh, whom he has also trained in tabla, and who went on to perform with Ali Akbar Khan and Ravi Shankar. His maternal nephew, Swapan Chaudhuri is also noted tabla player and a Sangeet Natak Akademi Fellow.

== Awards ==
- ITC Sangeet Research Academy award.
- Ustad Hafiz Ali Khan award.
- Sangeet Natak Academy award.

== See also ==
- Zakir Hussain
- Chandra Nath Shastri
- Anindo Chatterjee
- Swapan Chaudhuri
- Kumar Bose
- Yogesh Samsi
- Ananda Gopal Bandopadhyay
