= Ashutosh Bhattacharya =

Indian classical musician (1917–2004)

- Born: 17 March 1917; Benares, Benares State, British India
- Died: 8 February 2004 (aged 86) Varanasi, Uttar Pradesh, India
- Genre: Hindustani classical music
- Occupations: instrumentalist, music educator
- Instrument: Tabla

Ashutosh Bhattacharya (17 March 1917 – 8 February 2004) was a noted Indian classical musician of Hindustani classical music from Varanasi, who was a tabla player and music educator, as well as a practicing Ayurvedic doctor.

In 1966, he was awarded the Sangeet Natak Akademi Fellowship, the highest honour conferred by Sangeet Natak Akademi, India's National Academy for Music, Dance and Drama.

== Early life and background ==
Born in a Bengali family in Varanasi (Benaras), Uttar Pradesh, Bhattacharya grew up in the family of Ayurvedic doctors, where both his father and grandfather practiced Ayurvedic medicine. However, at a young age he showed musical inclination and at age 8 started learning the pakhawaj from Pandit Ram Nath Mishra. After a few years of training, he switched to learning the tabla from Pandit Kanthe Maharaj, noted tabla player of the Benares gharana, and uncle of Kishan Maharaj.

== Career ==
He started performing at the age of 21, when in 1937, he accompanied sarod maestro Allauddin Khan at the music concert in Allahabad. In the coming years, he accompanied leading musicians like, Pt. Ravi Shankar, Ustad Ali Akbar Khan and Ustad Vilayat Khan.

Besides his musical career, he also practiced Ayurvedic medicine at his clinic in Varanasi, and taught students. He died on 9 February 2004 in Varanasi, after a brief illness, at the age of 86. His son, Debabrata Bhattacharya, is a tabla player.

== See also ==
- Anokhelal Mishra
- Kishan Maharaj
- Samta Prasad
- Chandra Nath Shastri

== Bibliography ==
- Sudhish Chandra Banerjee (2006). Tabla and the world of Indian rhythms. Shubhi Publications. ISBN 9788182900936.
