= John Bergamo =

American percussionist and composer

John Bergamo (May 28, 1940 – October 19, 2013) was an American percussionist and composer known for his film soundtrack contributions and his work with numerous other notable performers. From 1970 until his death, he was the coordinator of the percussion department at the California Institute of the Arts.

== Music career ==
In 1959 Bergamo attended the Lenox School of Jazz in Lenox, Massachusetts, near Tanglewood, the summer home of the Boston Symphony. Under a scholarship, he studied drums with Max Roach; had Percy Heath and Kenny Dorham as jazz band instructors; studied history and theory with Gunther Schuller, Marshall Stearns, and George Russell; and was classmates with Ornette Coleman, and Don Cherry. In 1962 Bergamo earned an M.M. degree from Manhattan School of Music (studying percussion with Paul Price and composition with Michael Colgrass), followed by three summers in Tanglewood and time in New York City as a freelance musician.

In the fall of 1964, he joined the Creative Associates at the University at Buffalo. This group was formed by Lukas Foss, and its members included percussionist Jan Williams; composers George Crumb, Sylvano Bussotti, Mauricio Kagel, and Fred Myrow; bassist Buell Neidlinger; oboist / saxophonist Andrew White; singers Carol Plantamura, Sylvia Brigham Dimiziani, and Larry Bogue; trombonist Vinko Globokar; violinist Paul Zukofsky; clarinetist Sherman Friedlander; cellist Jay Humeston; pianist Michael Sahl; violist Jean Depuey; and flutist Karl Kraber.

The Creative Associates explored avant-garde music in a variety of 20th Century styles, and performed regularly in Buffalo and in New York's Carnegie Hall. Some of the results of this group included the first book of madrigals by George Crumb, Vibone by Vinko Globokar, Passion Selon Sade by Sylvano Bussotti, and Songs from the Japanese by Fred Myrow. From this group Bergamo became involved in smaller groups with Buell Neidlinger, Charles Gayle, and Andrew White; and a trio with George Crumb and Paul Zukofsky.

Relocating to the west coast in 1968, Bergamo taught briefly at the University of Washington before arriving at CalArts in 1970, where he taught from the school's origin until his retirement in 2005. On the west coast, he studied North and South Indian drumming as well as other non-European drumming traditions. Bergamo studied tabla with Mahaparush Misra, Ustad Alla Rakha, Pandit Taranath Rao, Shankar Ghosh, Swapan Chaudhuri, and South Indian drumming with T. H. Subash Chandran, T. H. Vinayakram, T. Ranganathan Poovalur Srinivasan, P.S. Venkatesan. Bergamo has also studied North Indian classical music with Ali Akbar Khan at the Ali Akbar College of Music in San Rafael, California, leading to a spell as Khansahib's road manager in late 1960s, and later playing with Ali Akbar Khan on works of a contemporary nature (such as the album Journey in 1990). In 1979 Bergamo studied the thavil in Chennai, India.

Bergamo co-founded two all-percussion groups: The Repercussion Unit in 1976 with Larry Stein, Ed Mann, James Hildebrandt, Gregg A. Johnson, Paul Anceau, and Steven "Lucky" Mosko; and The Hands On'Semble with Andrew Grueschow, Randy Gloss, and Austin Wrinkle in 1997.

Over the course of his career, Bergamo performed with Frank Zappa, Nexus, Dave Liebman, Ali Akbar Khan, Lou Harrison, Malcolm Goldstein, Mickey Hart, Emil Richards, Shadowfax, L. Shankar, Glen Velez, Repercussion Unit, Lukas Foss, Gunther Schuller, Walter Quintus, Charles Wuorinen (The Group for Contemporary Music at Columbia University), Shakti with John McLaughlin, Trichy Sankaran, and Steve Gadd, and participated in the "World Drums" performance at Expo 86.

In addition, he has performed on the soundtracks of a number of Hollywood films, including Act of Violence, Altered States, Bad News Bears Go to Japan, Chapter Two, Crossroads, The Exorcist II, The Heretic, Island of Dr. Moreau (1996), L.A. Story, National Lampoon's Class Reunion, Perfect Weapon, Popeye, The Possessed, Project X, A Reflection of Fear, The Scarecrow Sniper, Tarzan the Ape Man, and Who's Harry Crumb?.

== Discography ==
- 1977 - Zappa in New York, Frank Zappa (Barking Pumpkin).
- 1986 - Bergamo, John. On the Edge. (CMP)
- 1990 - Harrison, Lou. Music for Guitar and Percussion

== Filmography ==
- 1987 - World Drums. Directed by Niv Fichman. Produced by Rhombus Media.
- 1990 - Bergamo, John. The Art & Joy of Hand Drumming. Directed by Toby Keeler. Brattleboro, Vermont: Interworld Music
