= Swapan Chaudhuri =

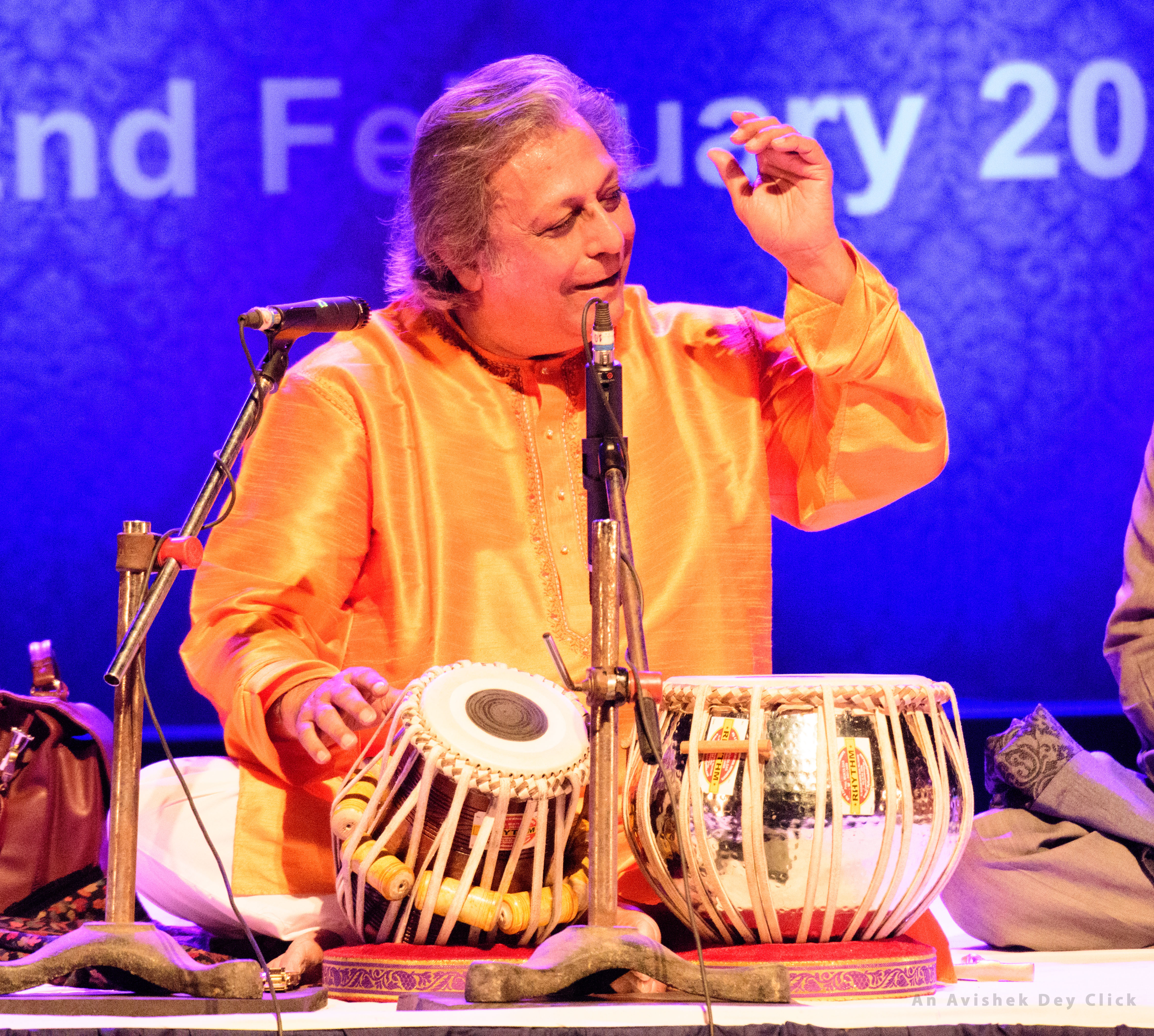
- Swapan Chaudhuri in 2020

Background information
- Born: March 30, 1945 (age 81)
- Genre: Hindustani classical music
- Instrument: tabla
- Years active: 1969 - present
- Awards: Sangeet Natak Academi Award (1996); Padma Shri (2019); Sangeet Natak Akademi Fellowship (2024-25)
- Website: www.swapan.com

Pandit Swapan Chaudhuri (born 30 March 1945), is an Indian tabla player and teacher belonging to the Lucknow gharana of Hindustani classical music. He has performed as a soloist and accompanied several musicians of Indian classical music, including, Pandit Ravi Shankar, Ustad Ali Akbar Khan, Ustad Vilayat Khan, Pandit Bhimsen Joshi, Nikhil Banerjee, Bhimsen Joshi, Pandit Jasraj, Ustad Amjad Ali Khan, Ken Zuckerman and many more. He has served as Director of Percussion at the Ali Akbar College of Music in California since 1981 and as Director of North Indian Percussion Studies at the California Institute of the Arts since 1991.

In 2022, he was awarded the Sangeet Natak Akademi Fellowship, the highest award of Sangeet Natak Akademi, India's National Academy for Performing arts, for his contribution to Indian music.

== Early life and training ==
Chaudhuri was born in Calcutta (now Kolkata) into a Bengali family with an interest in music. His mother was a vocalist and his maternal uncle was noted tabla player Pt Shankar Ghosh. Chaudhuri started his musical training with classical singing at an early age and later transitioned to tabla under the guidance of Pt Santosh Krishna Biswas of the Lucknow gharana, who was a close family friend. His subsequent teacher was Pandit P. L. Rana of the Lucknow gharana.

After completing his schooling, he obtained master's degrees in music and economics from Jadavpur University in Kolkata.

== Career ==
His big break came in 1969, when at age 24, he got a chance perform a solo piece at Kolkata home of sarod player Ustad Ali Akbar Khan, impressed by his skills, Khan chose him as accompanying artist for his next concert. In time, Khan became his mentor. In 1981, he joined the Ali Akbar College of Music in California as teacher and the director of percussion, besides teaching at the Los Angeles Walt Disney Conservatoire.

His son Nilan Chaudhuri is also a tabla performer and teacher.

== Awards ==
He received American Academy of Artists Award and was nominee to Percussive Arts Society Hall of Fame. In 1996, Swapan Chaudhuri received the Sangeet Natak Academi Award from the President of India, the highest awards for Classical Music in India. In 2019, he received the Padma Shri, one of India's highest honor from the Indian government.

== See also ==
- Zakir Hussain
- Chandra Nath Shastri
- Anindo Chatterjee
- Kumar Bose
- Yogesh Samsi
- Ravi Shankar
- Ustad Julfikar Hussain
