= Kumar Bose =

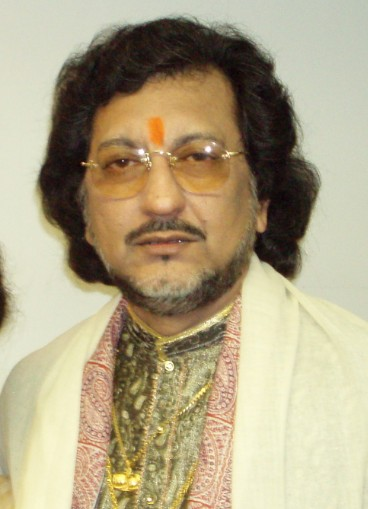

Background information
- Born: 4 April 1953 (age 73)
- Origin: Kolkata, West Bengal, India
- Genre: Hindustani classical music
- Occupations: classical musician, composer
- Instrument: Tabla

Kumar Bose (born 4 April 1953) is an Indian tabla musician and composer of Hindustani classical music. A leading exponent of the Benares gharana, he is the son and disciple of Pandit Biswanath Bose and later trained under the legendary Pandit Kishan Maharaj.

His style is noted for its power and clarity, spanning across classical, semi-classical, and fusion genres. In 2026, he was awarded the Padma Shri, India's fourth-highest civilian award, for his distinguished service to the arts.

== Family ==
Bose was born in Kolkata in a musical family. His father, Biswanath Bose, a tabla player, taught him his first lessons in rhythm.

His mother Vidushi Bharati Bose was a sitarist and disciple of Dabir Khan and Ali Akbar Khan Bharati received several awards in her career, including recognition as an All India Radio Artist and the President's Award for Best Sitar Performance in 1956. She guided her son with the basic forms of classical music and helped him to groom himself into professional tabla player.

His brother Acharya Jayanta Bose is an internationally reputed composer, lyrist, harmonium soloist, tabla player and singer, while his brother Debojyoti Bose is a sarod player and music director.

== Music career ==
Bose's first teacher was his father. After his father's death, he was taught by Padma Vibhushan Pandit Kishan Maharaj (Varanasi) (1923–2008).

=== Performances ===
Bose gave his first public performance at the age of 4. By 14, he performed abroad and has played at almost every major music halls in the world since. He has performed at the Royal Albert Hall and the Barbican Centre in London, the Kremlin in Moscow, the Lincoln Center for the Performing Arts and Carnegie Hall in New York, and at various venues throughout India. In addition to that, Kumar Bose performed at the Aga Khan Museum in Toronto, Canada in 2019 for the Raag-Mala Music Society of Toronto.

=== Achievements ===
- Padma Shri, 2026, for his distinguished service to the arts.
- Sangeet Natak Akademi Award, 2007, in recognition of his contributions to music.
- Banga Bibhushan, received from the Chief Minister of West Bengal, Mamata Banerjee.
- Sankat Mochan Award and Vidya Vachaspati from Varanasi.
- Pandit Hridaynath Mangeshkar Award, presented by Lata Mangeshkar.

== Discography ==
- Drums of India -Tabla Solo His Master's Voice STCS 850792
- Ustad Vilayet Khan His Master's Voice STCS O4B 7265
- SMRITI – Pt. Ravi Shankar His Master's Voice CHIX 1026
- Pandit Vishwa Mohan Bhatt His Master's Voice STCS 02B 6279
- Enchanting Folk Melodies on Instrumental Trio His Master's Voice HTCS 02B 2708
- SITAR VADAN- Pandit Nikhil Banerjee. Vol -I VENUS VCBG – 015
- SITAR VADAN – Pandit Nikhil Banerjee. Vol-II VENUS VCBG – 016
- AFTAAB-E-SITAR-Ustad Vilayet Khan EMI STCS 04B 7208
- INSTRUMENTAL TRIO – Vol-I His Master's Voice STCS 850318
- INSTRUMENTAL TRIO- Vol-II His Master's Voice STCS 850319
- SPIRIT OF FREEDOM CONCERT – Pandit Ravi Shankar
- Pandit Ravi Shankar Music Today
- The Golden Trio His Master's Voice
- Pandit V. G. Jog – Violin Recital
- Vishwa Mohan Bhatt Concord Records 05-16

CDs released are

- Raga Ragini – Indian Quintet Chhanda Dhara SP 84188
- Genesis Milan CDCH 287 RC690
- Spirit of India Chhanda Dhara SP 83688
- Ravi Shankar Inside the Kremlin BMG Records
- Nishat Khan EMI CD PSLP 5441
- Unique Ravi Shankar Chhanda Dhara SNCD 70991
- Brilliancy and Oldest Tradition – KISHEN MAHARAJ AND KUMAR BOSE Chhanda Dhara SNCD 70493
- Golden Jubilee Concert – Pt. Ravi Shankar Chhanda Dhara SNCD 70390
- Sublime Sounds of Sitar Oriental Records CD 116
- Pandit Ravi Shankar OCORA @558674 HM90
- Darbar Music Festival – 2006 Darbar Music

== See also ==
- Kishan Maharaj
- Shankar Ghosh
- Zakir Hussain
- Chandra Nath Shastri
- Anindo Chatterjee
- Swapan Chaudhuri
- Yogesh Samsi
- Ananda Gopal Bandopadhyay
- Rajkumar Misra
- Jayanta Bose
