= Anindo Chatterjee =

Indian tabla player (born 1954)

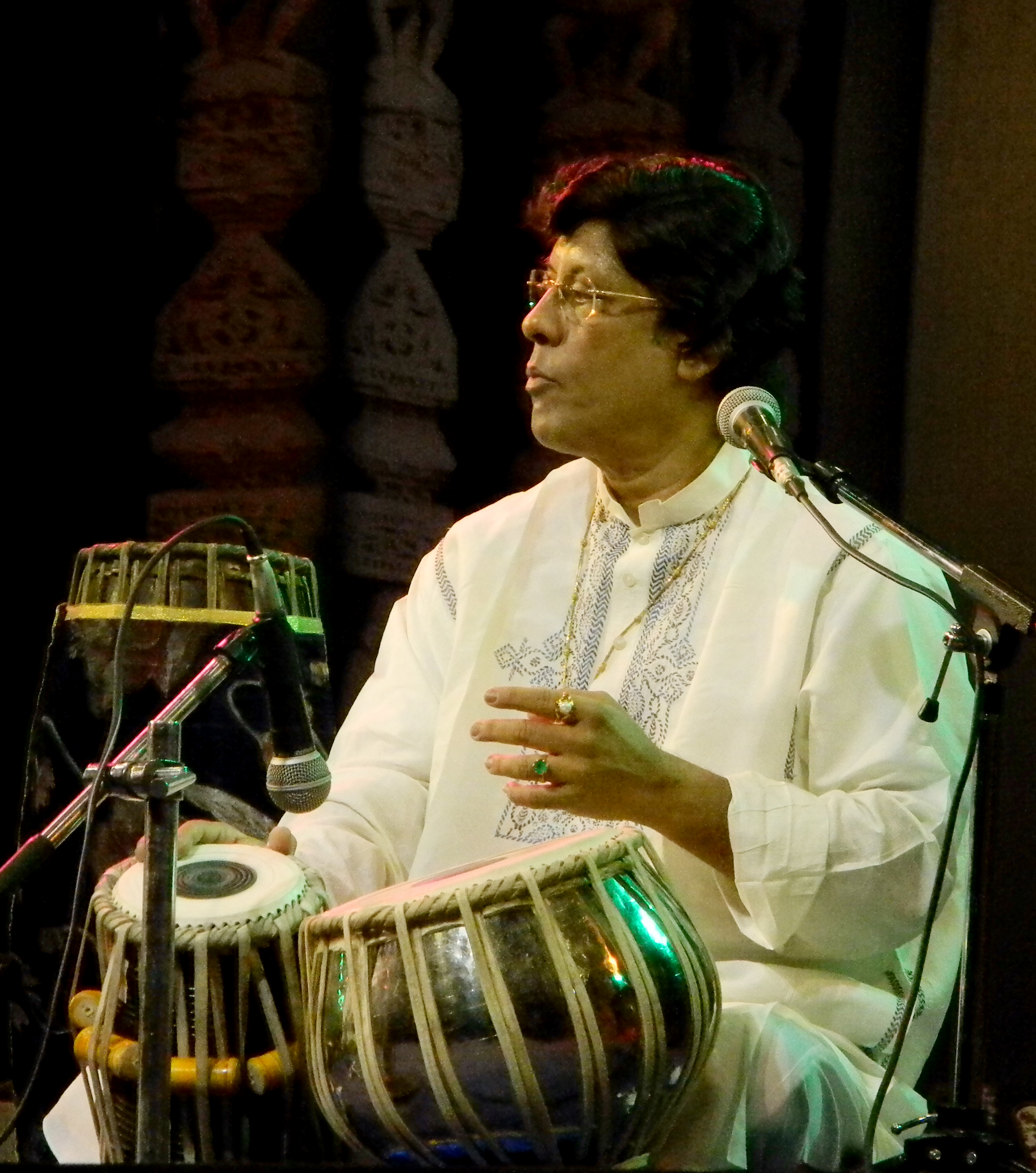
- Chatterjee performing at Rabindra Mandap, Bhubaneswar, Orissa, 2012.

Background information
- Born: 30 May 1954 (age 72); Kashimpur, North 24 Parganas, West Bengal, India
- Origin: India
- Genre: Hindustani classical music
- Occupation: Musician
- Instrument: tabla

Anindo Chatterjee is an Indian tabla player of the Farrukhabad gharana school. He was born into a musical family. Chatterjee is a disciple of Pandit Jnan Prakash Ghosh.

As director of the Farrukhabad gharana of Tabla, founded by Haji Vilayat Khan Saheb, Chatterjee continues to give new voice to his instrument. In addition to solo performances and recordings, Chatterjee has worked with sitar players Nikhil Banerjee, Imrat Khan, Budhaditya Mukherjee, Rais Khan, Pandit Ravi Shankar, Shahid Parvez, Manilal Nag and Krishna Bhatt; sarod players Buddhadev Das Gupta, Ali Akbar Khan, Ustad Amjad Ali Khan, and Tejendra Narayan Majumdar; flutist Pandit Hariprasad Chaurasia; santoor player Pandit Shivkumar Sharma; and vocalists Pandit Mallikarjun Mansur and Gangubai Hangal.

Inspired by his uncle, Pandit Biswanath Chatterjee, Anindo Chatterjee began playing tabla at the age of five. Studying briefly with Ustad Afaq Hussain Khan of the Lucknow Gharana, he advanced to studying under Pandit Jnan Prakash Ghosh, with whom he studied for three decades.

== Birth and education ==
Pandit Anindo Chatterjee was born on 30 May 1954 at Kashimpur Village, Duttapukur, North 24 Parganas, West Bengal, a musical family. He completed his primary education from Kashimpur Primary School. After that he passed the secondary examination from Kashimpur High School.

His uncle Pandit Debiprasad Chatterjee is an eminent sitar player of this country. His younger sister Smt. Keka Mukherjee is a leading sitar player of AIR and also well known for her solo performance. He is a disciple of Pandit Jnan Prakash Ghosh.

== Awards ==
The recipient of the prestigious President's Award in 1970, Chatterjee became the first tabla player to perform in the House of Commons 20 years later. He performed at Rashtrapati Bhavan when US president Barack Obama visited India in November 2010. Chatterjee received the Sangeet Natak Academy Award for 2002.

Chatterjee declined to receive the Padma Shri Award 2022. He said:

However I politely declined. I said thank you but I am not ready to receive Padma Shri at this phase of my career. I have passed that phase.

== Discography ==
- 1982 Raga, Baul Melody & Tabla Solo (LP, Album), Chhanda Dhara / SP 7082
- 1983 Pandit Ramgopal Misra And His Orchestra / Anindo Chatterjee - Kathak Music / Tabla Ekak (LP, Album), Chhanda Dhara / SP 8083
- 1983 Nandu Muley / Anindo Chatterjee - Raga Ahir-Bhairav / Raga Ragesree (LP)
- 1985 Hariprasad Chaurasia, Anindo Chatterjee - Fabulous Flute Of Hariprasad Chaurasia (LP, Album), Chhanda Dhara / SP 10185
- 1989 Hariprasad Chaurasia, Anindo Chatterjee - Rāg Lalit, Nimbus Records
- 1990 Budhaditya Mukherjee, Anindo Chatterjee - Rāg Rāmkalī / Rāg Jhiñjoṭī, Nimbus Records
- 1990 Ram Narayan, Anindo Chatterjee - Rag Shankara, Rag Mala in Jogia (CD, Album), Nimbus Records / NI 5245
- 1992 Stephen James (3) - Anindo Chatterjee - Raga And Tala (Cass) Divergo n. 4
- 1996 Pandit Amit Bhattacharya, Anindo Chatterjee - Homage To Guruma Annapurna Devi & Pandit Jotin Bhattacharya (CD, Album), Keltia Musique Kcmd 54
- 2007 Taro Terahara / Pt.Anindo Chatterjee - Air (CD, Album, RP), Nada Music NADA-003

== See also ==
- Ananda Gopal Bandopadhyay
- Kumar Bose
- Swapan Chaudhuri
- Nayan Ghosh
- Zakir Hussain
