= Anokhelal Mishra =

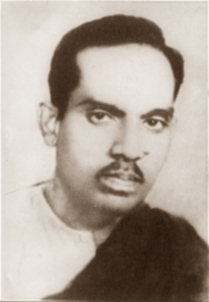
- Tabla Samrat Pandit Anokhelal Mishra

Background information
- Born: 1914; Benares, United Provinces, British India
- Origin: Varanasi, Uttar Pradesh, India
- Died: 1958 (aged 44)
- Genres: Hindustani Classical Music (Banaras Gharana)
- Occupations: Classical musician, Music teacher
- Instrument: Tablā
- Years active: 1929–1958

Anokhelal Mishra (Hindi: अनोखेलाल मिश्र; 1914.. – 10 March 1958) — also spelled as Anokhe Lal Misra and commonly known as Pandit Anokhelal-ji — was an Indian Tablā Artist who belonged to the Banaras Gharana of Hindustani classical music.

== Early life ==
Anokhelal was born in a very poor family of Kashi (Banaras), now known as Varanasi (State – Uttar Pradesh). Anokhelal learnt tabla under Bhairow Prasad Mishra (Bhairow is also spelled as Bhairav or Bhairon). Bhairow Prasad Mishra detected his talent and enrolled him as a student of the tabla in the Banaras Gharana of Ram Sahaiji at the age of 5 or 6 years. Bhairow Prasad Mishra was disciple of Bhagat-ji. Bhagat-ji was disciple of Ram Sahai, the founder of The Banaras-Bāj (aka Banaras Gharana). According to The Banaras Bāj-The Tablā Tradition of a North Indian City by David Roach. Anokhelal learnt tabla for about 15 years from Bhairow Prasad Mishra. Anokhelal was the most famous disciple of Bhairav Prasad Mishra among Maulvi Ram Mishra, Mahavir Bhatt, Mahadev Prasad Mishra, Anokhelal Mishra, and Nageshvar Prasad.

He lost his parents as teenager. After that he was brought up by his grandmother. As a child, Anokhelal had to suffer poverty and deprivation.

== Musical journey ==
Anokhelal put in unremitting riyaaz (practice) under the guidance of Guruji (Master), which went on for hours together, every day.

=== Special abilities ===
He was called the Jadugar (wizard) of ' Na Dhin Dhin Na ' (theka of Teen Taal- 16 beats) and ' Dhere Dhere Kite Taka ' (particular tabla syllables). He used to play these and many more syllables with clarity even at extreme speed. He was skilled at fast playing ' Na Dhin Dhin Na ' with his 1st finger.

=== Performances ===
Pandit Anokhelal was a soloist as well as an accompanist. Anokhelal performed a number of solo concerts during his career and also gave 'Sangat' (accompany) to many famous musicians and classical dancers. Some of them are Ustad Allauddin Khan, Ustad Vilayat Khan, Ustad Ali Akbar Khan, etc.

Within his short span of life he performed regularly, throughout India. At a time, when performing in the 'National Programme of Music' on All India Radio was a matter of prestige, Pandit Anokhelal figured in the same, a number of times. In the late 1950s, his programmes were broadcast by the Voice of America as well.

== Legacy and critical acclaim ==
He is also known as the Samrat (king) of Tabla Playing. According to many, to Anokhelalji goes the credit of making the audience familiar with the Banaras style of Tabla.

His disciple Chandra Nath Shastri has written about Pandit Anokhelal Mishra in his web article:

"He had a very simple livelihood. He knew only Sadhana (practice) of rendering Tabla."

Tabla player Pandit Samta Prasad Mishra said in an interview that:

"I am playing only one fourth of Pandit Anokhelal Mishra's style and they glorify my name. In the next life I will produce half of his sound quality, then they will really be floored!"

Tabla player Sadanand Naimpalli has written in his book about Anokhelal. He said:

"Apart from his skills as an accompanist, his solo-recitals were also proof of his excellent taiyaari and tonal sweetness."

=== Nature and personality ===
He used to maintain a sober and normal life profile rather than showing off and behaving like a celebrity. He never publicised himself of what he was.

== Disciples ==
Anokhelal trained many musicians of India. Ramji Mishra, Mahapurush Misra, Ishwarlal Mishra (alias Lallu), Chhotelal Misra, Chandra Nath Shastri, Radhakanta Nandi, Kashinath Mishra (son), Bityut Banerjee, Partha Nath Shastri, Sanjay Mishra (Grandson), Sundar Lal Mishra and Chakkan Lal Mishra are some of the prominent pupils of Pt. Anokhelal Mishra. One of the most notable disciple was Pt. Chhotelal Mishra.

== Death ==
He was afflicted by gangrene on his left foot, in 1956 and for this disease he expired on 10 March 1958, at a young age of 44.

== Inspiration ==
According to Sandip Bhattacharya (Disciple of Iswarlal Mishra):

"Pandit Anokhelal Mishra has been, and will continue to be, an inspiration to many tabla players from this generation, as well as future generations."

== Discography ==
- "Samrat" Rare Gems, Tal: Teental, Duration: 45.27mins, accompanied on Harmonium by Jnanprakash Ghosh.

This recording dates back to 26 December 1957 at a concert attended by artists like Ahmed Jan Thirakwa, Habibuddin Khan, Maseet Khan, Karamatulla Khan etc.

A short video of Anokhelalji has been made available by the Huntley Film Archives Video on YouTube.

== See also ==
- Ahmed Jan Thirakwa
- Kishan Maharaj
- Samta Prasad
- Chandra Nath Shastri
- Zakir Hussain
- Alla Rakha
