= Ali Akbar College of Music =

Schools specializing in Indian classical music

Coordinates: 37.9741°N 122.54231°W

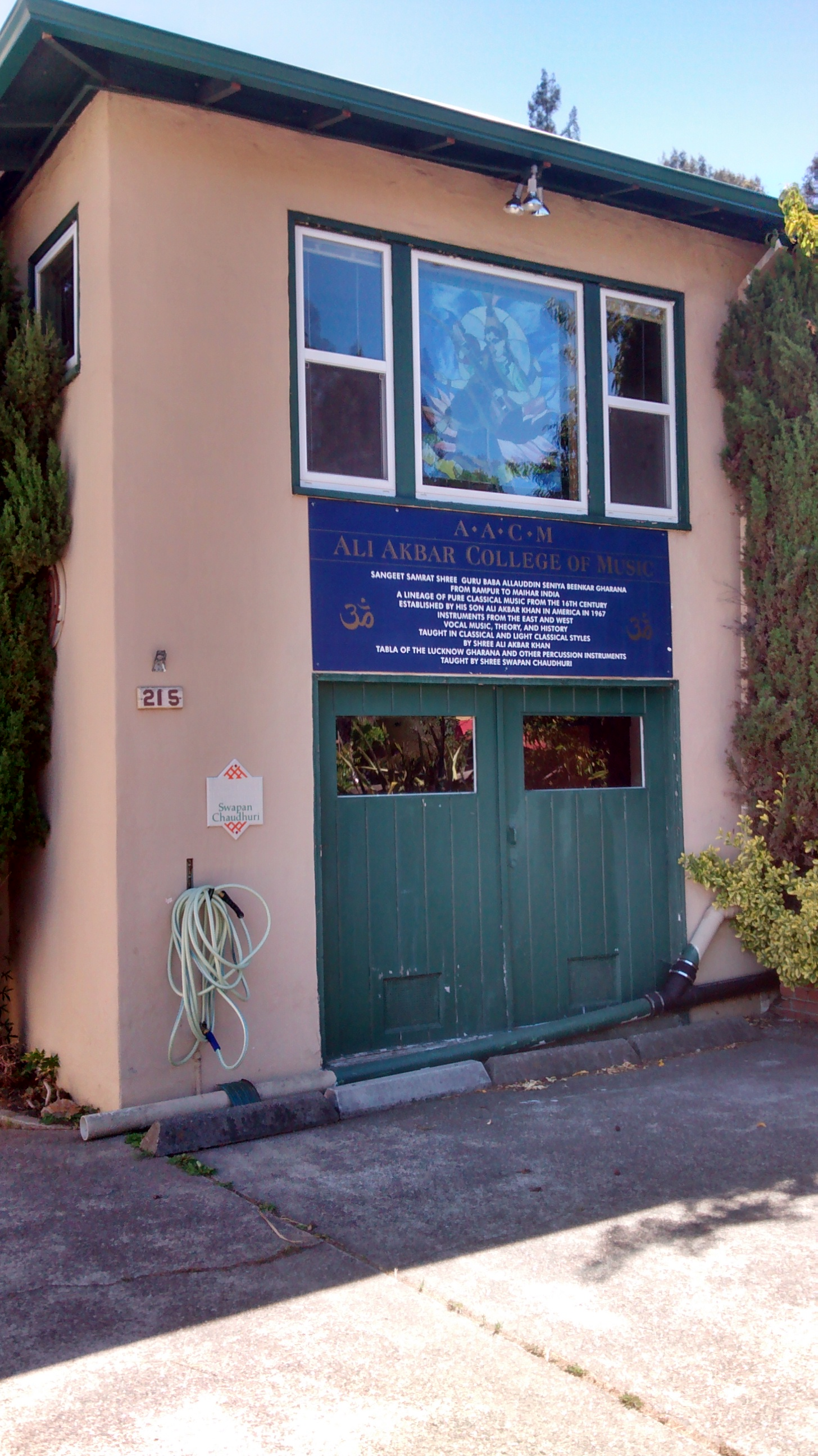
Ali Akbar College of Music, San Rafael location, in June 2014.

The Ali Akbar College of Music (AACM) is the name of three schools founded by Indian musician Ali Akbar Khan to teach Indian classical music. The first was founded in 1956 in Calcutta, India. The second was founded in 1967 in Berkeley, California, but moved to its current location in San Rafael, California the next year. The third was founded in 1985 in Basel, Switzerland, and is run by Khan's disciple Ken Zuckerman.

In 2003, a collection from the AACM's sound archives formed one of the 50 "culturally, historically, or aesthetically significant" recorded works chosen by the Library of Congress to be added to the National Recording Registry. Among these AACM recordings were live performances by Allauddin Khan, Kishan Maharaj, Nikhil Banerjee and Alla Rakha.

== Notable faculty ==
- Swapan Chaudhuri
- Shankar Ghosh

== Notable students ==
- Vic Briggs / Antion Vikram Singh Meredith, British blues and rock musician
- David R. Courtney, artist, writer, and Green Party politician
- Marco Eneidi, free jazz saxophonist
- Julian Lage, guitarist and composer
- Arthur Russell, composer, producer, and vocalist
- Derek Trucks, guitarist, bandleader, and songwriter
- Jai Uttal, guitarist, bandleader, and songwriter

== See also ==
- Delhi Music Academy
- Eastern Fare Music Foundation
- Kinnara School of Music
