= David Courtney (disambiguation) =

David Courtney is a British singer and record producer.

David Courtney may also refer to:

- David R. Courtney (born 1953), artist, writer, and political activist
- Dave Courtney (1959-2023), British gangster and author
- "David Courtney", a song about the gangster by Rancid from their 2003 album Indestructible
