= Ganesh Prasad Mishra =

Indian Classical Singer

- Born: Ganesh Mishra; Varanasi, Uttar Pradesh, India
- Other name: Guruji
- Occupations: Singer; composer
- Years active: 1992–present

Pandit Ganesh Prasad Mishra is a Hindustani classical music singer, He is also the son and disciple of Mahadev Prasad Mishra. He is known for his thumri style of singing.
