= The Raga Guide =

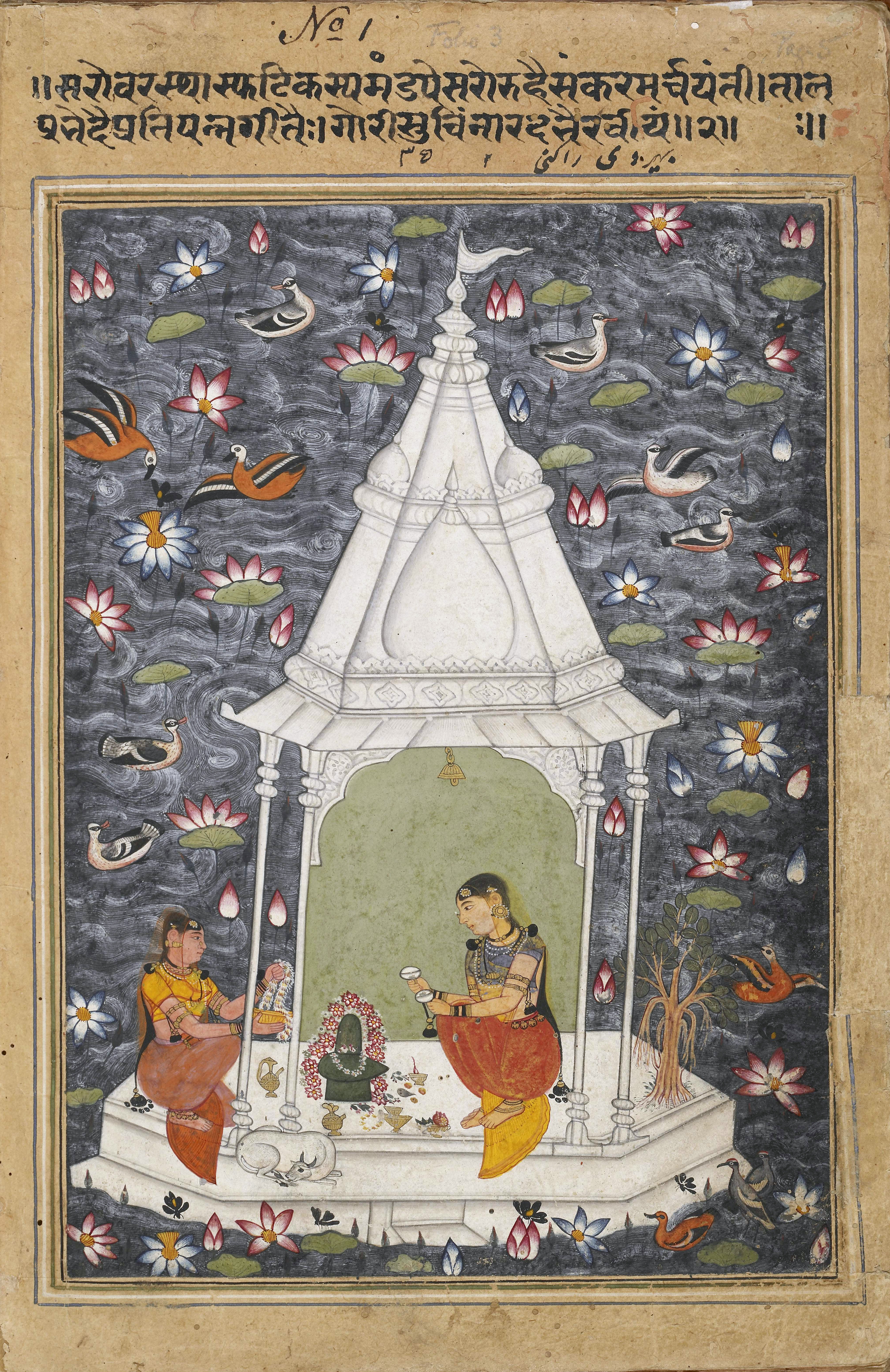
Scene depicting the Bhairavi raga, used as cover picture

The Raga Guide is a 1999 Nimbus Records compilation of 74 Hindustani ragas on four CDs. It includes a textbook edited by Joep Bor (of the Rotterdam Conservatory of Music) with information and western-style transcriptions of the ragas and a catalogue of two sets of ragamala plates, dated to c. 1610 and 1650. The 1610 plates are painted in the Mughal style.

The featured artists are Vidyadhar Vyas (vocal), Shruti Sadolikar-Katkar (vocal), Buddhadev Das Gupta (sarod), and Hariprasad Chaurasia (flute).
