= Kabir Chaura =

Locality in Varanasi, India

Coordinates: 25.320°N 83.008°E

Kabir Chaura is a locality in Varanasi, India. It is known as the place where the great mystic poet and saint Kabir grew up. The word 'Chaura' is a distortion of 'Chauraha', literally meaning a four-way crossing (chau meaning "four"; raha meaning "way"). Kabir Chaura is also known as the home of Indian musicians and dancers Kishan Maharaj, Gopi Krishan, Samta Prasad and the brothers Rajan and Sajan Mishra.

== History ==
Surat Gopal, an immediate disciple of Kabir, was the founder of the Kabir Chaura maṭh (also known as bāp meaning "father") in Varanasi. It conducted missionary activities in Gujarat, Uttar Pradesh, and Bihar and had a branch located at Magahar. It was dedicated to disseminating the teachings of Kabir.
