= Ananda Gopal Bandopadhyay =

Indian tabla player (1942–2021)

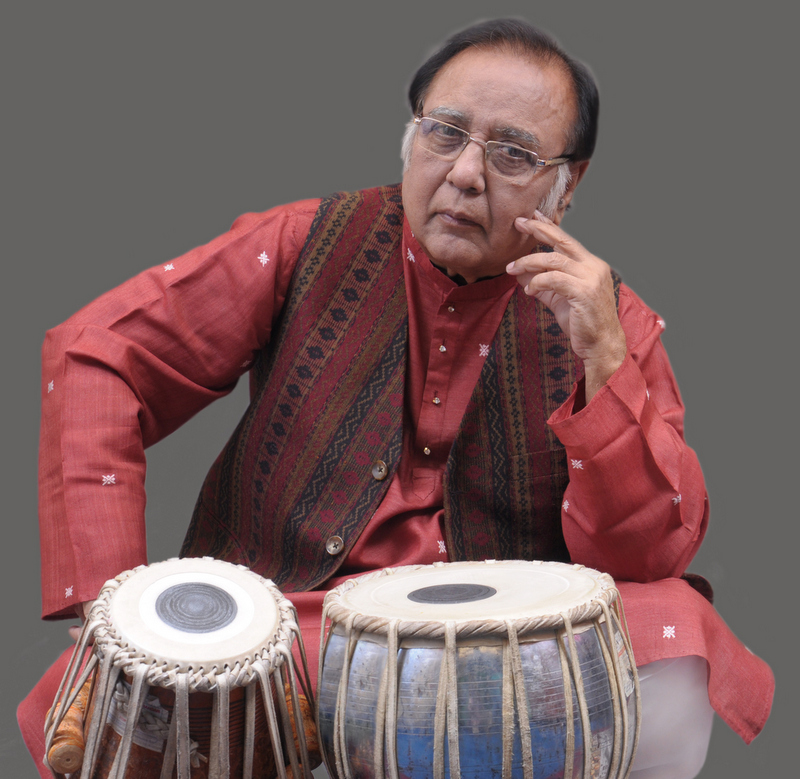
- Born: April 28, 1942; Uttar Pradesh, India
- Died: May 7, 2021 (aged 79); Kolkata, West Bengal, India
- Known for: Tabla player

Ananda Gopal Bandopadhyay (April 28, 1942 – May 7, 2021) was an Indian tabla player. He was trained in the style of the Benaras Gharana by his teacher Mahadev Prasad Mishra. His father, Radha Gopal Bandopadhyay, was an amateur vocalist. Bandopadhyay has accompanied several notable vocal musicians, as well as producing solo recordings, and giving solo performances.

== Musical career ==
Over his career, he has accompanied several notable Hindusthani classical singers. He has also performed in several cities outside India, including Boston, New York, San Francisco, and Los Angeles, as well as the World Youth Festival in Berlin. Bandopadhyay was a past faculty member of ITC Sangeet Research Academy in Kolkata, as well as a top rated artist of All India Radio and Doordarshan.

In 1965, he won the first prize in The All India Radio music competition, and was awarded the President's gold medal. In 1970, the Emperor of Ethiopia presented him with a gold medal, which is an honor not frequently extended to foreign musicians. In 2012, he was awarded the Sangeet Ratna Award by The Salt Lake Music Association.

== Personal life ==
Ananda Gopal Bandopadhyay was married to Rekha Bandopadhyay. He is the father of Pran Gopal Bandopadhyay, a tabla player whom he trained, and Kasturi Bandopadhyay, a Hindusthani classical and semi-classical vocalist.

== See also ==
- Zakir Hussain
- Anindo Chatterjee
- Kumar Bose
- Shankar Ghosh
- Suresh Talwalkar
