= Afternoon Ragas =

Studio album by Nikhil Banerjee
- Released: 1992
- Recorded: May 17, 1970
- Genre: Hindustani classical music
- Label: Raga Records

Professional ratings
Review scores
Source	Rating
Allmusic	4/5 stars

Afternoon Ragas is a studio album by Nikhil Banerjee and includes performances of the ragas Bhimpalasi (or Bhimpalasri) and Multani. Though originally recorded in 1970, it wasn't released until 22 years later, in 1992.

== Track listing ==
1. "Bhimpalasri Alap" – 10:40
2. "Bhimpalasri Slow Rupak Tal" – 15:30
3. "Bhimpalasri Fast Tintal" – 6:38
4. "Bhimpalasri Jhala" – 2:51
5. "Multani Alap" – 10:39
6. "Multani Medium Tintal" – 17:40
7. "Multani Fast Tintal" – 4:25
8. "Multani Jhala" – 9:02
