= Benares gharana =

Style of playing the Indian tabla

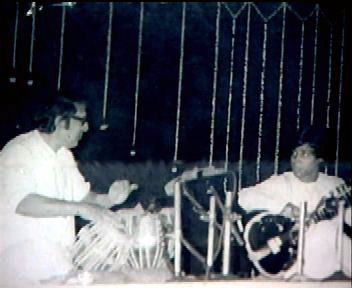
Shahid Parvez Khan at a concert accompanied by Benaras Gharana tabla player Pt. Samta Prasad

Benares gharānā (Hindi: बनारस घराना) is one of the six most common styles of playing of the Indian tabla.

== History ==
The Benaras tabla gharana was developed a little over 200 years ago by Pandit Ram Sahai (1780–1826). At the age of nine, Ram moved to Lucknow to become a disciple of Modhu Khan of the Lucknow gharana.

After some time performing in Benares, Pandit Ram Sahai felt the need to make a significant change in his tabla playing. For six months, he withdrew into seclusion, and worked to develop what is now known as the Benares baj or style of tabla playing. The philosophy behind this new style of tabla playing is that it would be versatile enough to perform solo, and to accompany any form of music or dance. The tabla would be able to play delicately, as required for khyal, or more aggressively, like pakhawaj, for the accompaniment of dhrupad or kathak dance. Ram Sahai developed a new way of fingering the tabla strokes; especially important is the sound Na, being played with a curved ring finger to allow for maximum resonance of the dahina. He also composed numerous compositions within existing compositional forms (gats,tukdas, fard, parans< etc.) and created new forms, such as uthan, Benarasi theka, and fard.

== Characteristics ==
Today, the Benares tabla gharana is well known for its powerful sound, though Benares players are also very capable of playing delicately and sensitively. The gharana is categorized into the Purbi (eastern) baj, which includes the Farukhabad, Lucknow, and Benares gharanas. The Benares style makes use of the more resonant strokes of tabla, such as Na (played on the lao), and Din.

== Exponents ==
The tabla solo is highly developed in the Benares gharana, and some artists, such as Anokhelal Mishra, Samta Prasad, Nanhku Maharaj (Fardi Baj)13th generations, and Kishan Maharaj, have become famous as tabla soloists. The direct descendants making up the 6th generation of tabla players are Mahapurush Misra, Ananda Gopal Bandopadhyay (disciple of Mahadev Prasad Mishra), and Chandra Nath Shastri (disciple of Anokhelal Mishra). The 7th generation consists of Kumar Bose, Pt Ashis Chakraborty (disciples of Pt. Mahapurush Mishra) and Sukhwinder Singh 'Pinky' (disciples of Kishan Maharaj), Sanju Sahai (disciple of Sharda Sahai) and Shubh Maharaj, grandson and disciple of Pandit Kishan Maharaj also considered as one of the torch bearers of Benaras Gharana.

Other noted artists include Kanthe Maharaj, uncle and guru of Kishan Maharaj, and whose disciples were Badri Maharaj and Ashutosh Bhattacharya.

The Benares baj makes use of over 20 different compositional types, and has a varied repertoire of each type.

Reputed players of the gharana include Anokhelal Mishra (1914–1958), Samta Prasad (1921–1994), Nanhku Maharaj(1921-1995), Kishan Maharaj (1923–2008), Ashutosh Bhattacharya (1917–2004), Prakash Maharaj (born 1945-2003), Chandra Nath Shastri (b. 1948), Ananda Gopal Bandopadhyay (b. 1942-2021), Kumar Bose (b. 1953), Udai Mazumdar (b. 1970), Sandeep Das (b. 1971), Nandan Mehta (1942–2010), Pt.Ravinath Mishra, and Prabhash Maharaj (1982).
