= Sandeep Das =

Indian Tabla player and composer

Sandeep Das(সন্দীপ দাস)
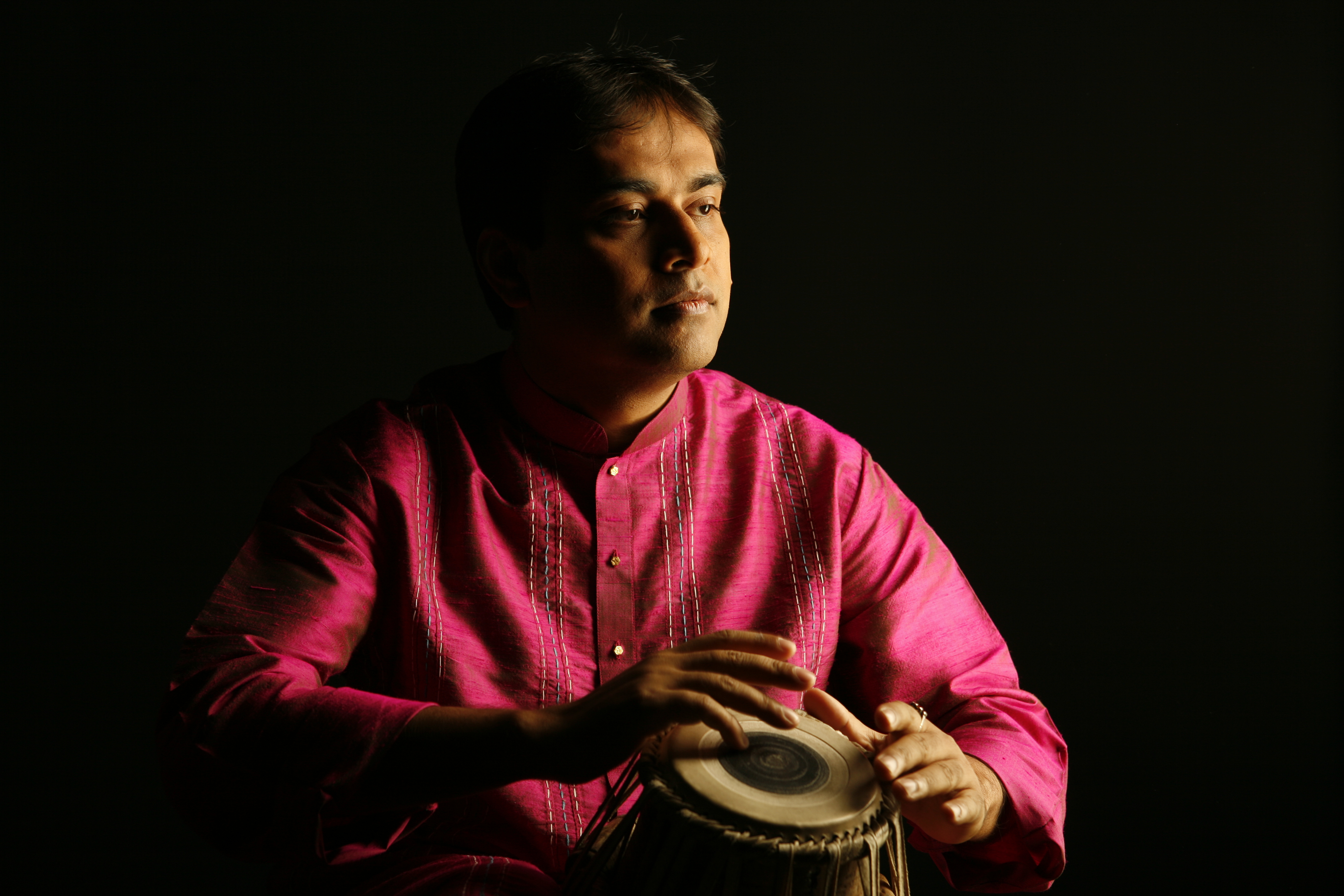
- Tabla Virtuoso Sandeep Das

Background information
- Born: Patna, Bihar, India
- Genres: Indian classical; classical crossover
- Occupations: Tabla player; composer; educator
- Instrument: Tabla
- Years active: fl. ca. 1985–present
- Website: sandeepdas.com

Sandeep Das is an Indian tabla player and composer currently based in Boston, Massachusetts, United States.

His collaboration with Yo-Yo Ma for The Silk Road Ensemble - Sing Me Home - won the Grammy award for Best World Music Album at the 59th Grammy Awards, 2017. He was previously nominated twice for the Grammy Award in 2005 and 2009.

== Early life and education ==
Sandeep Das was born in Patna, Bihar, India. His family was originally from Chandannagar, West Bengal, relocating to Patna in the 1970s. Das completed his schooling from St. Xavier's High School, Patna (1975–1985). He graduated in English Literature with gold medal from Banaras Hindu University. He first began learning Tabla under Pt. Shiv Kumar Singh at the age of 8.

=== Benares Gharana ===
Das started learning from Kishan Maharaj, under the Indian Guru-shishya tradition, at the age of 9. Das would travel on weekends from his home in Patna, to Benaras, where his Guru lived. Later, his family shifted to Benares so that his musical education could continue unhindered. After 11 years of learning the Benaras Gharana style of Tabla playing, Das moved to Delhi in 1990, to pursue his career as a professional Tabla player.

== Career ==
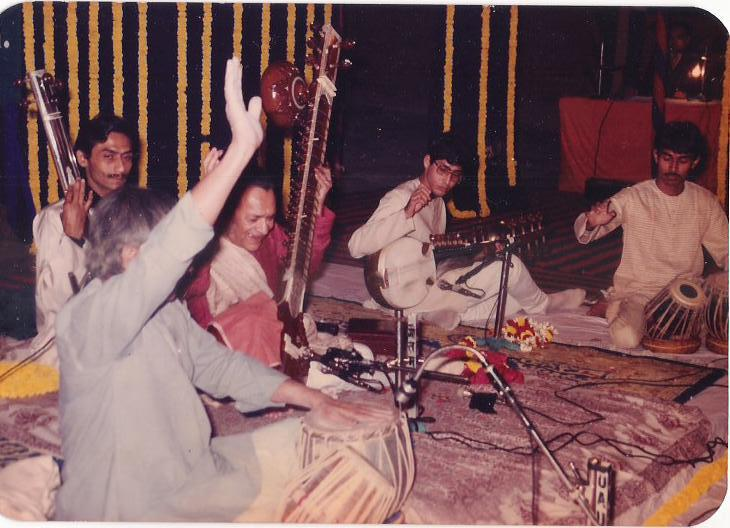
Stage debut with Ravi Shankar and Kishanji Maharaj

=== Indian Classical Music ===
In 1986, Das made his stage debut in India (at the age of 15), with Sitar maestro Ravi Shankar. He was three times the national drumming champion. He was also, at the time, the youngest drummer to be graded by Akashvani (radio broadcaster) (All India Radio). Das moved to Delhi in 1990 to pursue his career as a professional Tabla player, and began playing with prominent musicians such as Shubha Mudgal, Amjad Ali Khan, Hariprasad Chaurasia, Shivkumar Sharma, and Shujaat Khan among others.

=== World Music ===
In 1991, Das debuted outside India, with steel drum bands in Trinidad. In 2001, he performed with the New York Philharmonic, under the direction of Kurt Masur for a work composed by Kayhan Kalhor. In April 2012, he premiered a work written for him by eminent composer Evan Ziporyn, as a soloist with the Boston Modern Orchestra Project. His composition Tarang is the theme music for Blind Sight, a documentary about the first Mount Everest climb by six blind climbers.

He has been nominated for the Grammy Awards twice. In 2003, his recording The Rain was nominated for a Grammy in the World Music category. In this album, Sandeep Das collaborated with Shujaat Khan and Kayhan Kalhor. In 2009, a recording with Silk Road Ensemble got him a nomination for the Grammy in the Classical Crossover section for the album Off the Map. His track Sulvasutra, composed by Evan Ziporyn, features in this album.

=== Silk Road Project ===
Das has composed for and performed internationally with the Silk Road Ensemble of Yo-Yo Ma since the group's founding in 2000. When he started playing with the Silk Road, Yo-Yo Ma was surprised to learn that, Das did not read music scores, but could memorize a piece.

With the ensemble, he has performed extensively, including, the United Nations General Assembly Hall in New York in 2008, BBC Proms in 2004 and 2009, and the Opening Ceremony of the Special Olympic Games in Shanghai. His composition Mohini, is the theme music for a 10-episode documentary on the Silk Road, produced by Japanese TV channel NHK.

== Educational Initiatives ==
Das' projects are frequently in residence at leading academic institutions and Ivy League campuses such as Harvard University, Stanford University, Princeton University, and Dartmouth College, among others.

=== 2020 - Present ===
In 2023, Das taught a semester-long course at Dartmouth College that taught students basic technique of tabla, using the instrument as a vehicle for a deeper understanding of classical Indian artistic traditions. The course culminated in a residency of his Delhi to Kabul project at the college. Delhi to Kabul was again in residence at Rochester Institute of Technology in 2024, which featured a panel discussion on the topic of "Innovation, Tradition, Communication, and Collaboration" including Das, Joel Hunt (Visiting Assistant Professor, School of Performing Arts), Jay Alan Jackson (Associate Professor, School of Interactive Games and Media/School of Mathematics and Statistics), and Seshavadhani Kumar (Professor, School of Mathematics and Statistics), exploring how high-level artistic practice is applicable to STEM fields. Das' Hearing Math project, which examines relationships between Indian classical music and higher math, will debut at Princeton University in October 2026.

=== 2012 and Earlier ===
In 2012, Sandeep Das was invited by the Harvard Graduate School of Education to teach a course on Arts in Education. He has given masterclasses at Juilliard School of Music, Berklee College of Music, Rhode Island School of Design, Harvard University Academy of Music in Villecroze, France, Stanford University, and more.

== Nonprofit Organizations Founded by Das ==
Das is the founder of two nonprofit arts organizations.

=== Layālaya Arts Initiative - USA ===
Das founded the Layālaya Arts Initiative in 2025, a 501(c)3 nonprofit, with the mission of creating opportunities for people to engage with new ideas, traditions, and perspectives through artistic and cultural encounters. The organization's first major event will be the Layālaya Global Arts Festival, taking place on Oct. 10, 2026 in Woodstock, CT.

=== Harmony and Universality through Music (HUM) - India ===
Das founded HUM (Harmony and Universality through Music) in 2009, to promote global understanding through musical performance and education. HUM has supported the musical education of 9 specially-abled children through the HUM-Lanxess National Scholarship, providing tuition fees for the guru; transportation costs for attending classes; and funds for buying books, instruments, and study/practice material. The ensemble was inspired by the Silk Road Project and Yo-Yo Ma's vision to connect the world through music. In March 2010, HUM presented its World Premiere Concert at Kamani Auditorium, New Delhi and Birla Sabhaghar, Kolkatta. In February 2011, the HUM Ensemble performed its Rhythm of Life Concert at Siri Fort Auditorium, New Delhi and NCPA, Mumbai.

In November 2012, its World Harmony Concert was performed at the Kamani Auditorium in New Delhi, and the concert received critical acclaim in the Indian media. Through these concerts, HUM raises funds for its endeavors to support education in arts of disabled children. HUM also plans to provide health insurance for aging artists.

The HUM Ensemble now tours extensively in the United States and has recently performed at venues like the National Gallery of Art, Carolina Performing Arts, and Cal Performances.

== Original Compositions ==
Sandeep's compositions exhibit both the Western and Indian genres of music. He has composed multiple pieces over the years including Soul Mitra (2019),Vaishnavi (2018), Vairocana (2018) King Ashoka (2016), If You Shall Return (2016), Mohini (2006), Srishti (2005), and Tarang (2002).

=== Vaishnavi (2018) ===
Vaishnavi was inspired by a ninth century statue of Queen Sembiyan Mahadevi as the Goddess Parvati on display at the Smithsonian Freer | Sackler galleries in Washington, D.C, and was commissioned by the Freer | Sackler from Silkroad in honor of Julian Raby through a generous gift from Jeffrey P. Cunard. The piece begins with an alap between the Sheng (Chinese Mouth Organ) and Bass that transitions to the rhythm cycle, Jhaptaal. Vaishnavi was originally performed as a trio of Tabla, Sheng, and Bass, but has been performed in several alternate instrumentations such as Tabla and Bass. The piece can currently be heard playing in the museum on its audio tour.

== Discography ==
- Delhi to Damascus, Sandeep Das & the HUM Ensemble, 2020, Label: In a Circle Records
- Sing Me Home, Silk Road Ensemble, 2016, Label: Sony Masterworks
- Diva Girija Devi, Girija Devi, 2016, Label: Times Music
- A Playlist Without Borders, Silk Road Ensemble, 2013, Label: Sony Masterworks
- Big Grenadilla/Mumbai, with Evan Ziporyn, 2012, Label: Cantaloupe Music
- Off the Map, Silk Road Ensemble, 2009, Label: World Village
- New Impossibilities, Silk Road Ensemble, 2007, Label: Sony Classics
- My Inspirations, Amjad Ali Khan, 2006, Label: Navras Records
- Silk Road Journeys: Beyond the Horizon, Silk Road Ensemble, 2005, Label: Sony Classical Records
- Sonata, Ayaan Ali Bangash, 2005, Label: Studio Synthesis
- The Essential Yo-Yo Ma, 2005, Label: Sony Classical Records
- Enchantment, Silk Road Ensemble, 2004, Label: Sony Classical Records
- The Rain, Ghazal Ensemble, 2004, Label: ECM Records
- Indian Delta, Vishwa Mohan Bhatt, 2002, Label: Sense World Music
- The Taj Heritage Series: Pt. Vishwa Mohan Bhatt, Vishwa Mohan Bhatt, 2002, Label: Virgin Records
- Silk Road Journeys: When Strangers Meet, Silk Road Ensemble, 2002, Label: Sony Classical Records
- The Best of the Cord, Vishwa Mohan Bhatt, 1996, Label: Indian Music Club
- Maestros Mehfil, Various Artists, 1995, T-Series
- The Tradition of Khyal on Sitar, Shujaat Khan, 1995, Label: Makal Records
- Lure of the Desert, Vishwa Mohan Bhatt, 1994, Label: T-Series
- Raag Bilaskhani Todi, Shujaat Khan, 1994, Label: Young Spirit Records

== Awards and recognition ==
- Massachusetts Cultural Council Fellow, Traditional Arts, 2022
- John Simon Guggenheim Memorial Foundation Fellow, 2019
- Live Arts Boston Grant Recipient, The Boston Foundation, 2018
- Grammy Award, Best World Music Album, 2017, for the album Sing Me Home.
- Brother Thomas Fellow, The Boston Foundation, 2017
- New England Choice Awards Artist of the Year, 2017
- Grammy Nomination, Best Classical Crossover Album, 2009, for album Off The Map.
- Grammy Nomination, Best World Music Album, 2005, for the album The Rain.
- Awarded Chattra Vibhushan by Banaras Hindu University
- Awarded Significant Achievement Award by St. Xavier's High School
- Awarded Patna College Blue by Patna College

== Personal life ==
Sandeep Das resides in Boston, Massachusetts, USA. He met his future wife Tripti while they were members of the National Cadet Corps, at the 1985 Republic Day celebrations of India. They have two daughters, Sakshi and Sonakshi.
