= List of presidential trips made by Barack Obama (2010) =

This is a list of presidential trips made by Barack Obama during 2010, the second year of his presidency as the 44th president of the United States. During 2010, Obama traveled to eight nation states, in addition to many more trips made domestically.

This list excludes trips made within Washington, D.C., the US federal capital in which the White House, the official residence and principal workplace of the president, is located. Additionally excluded are trips to Camp David, the country residence of the president, and to the private home of the Obama family in Kenwood, Chicago.

== January ==
Country/ U.S. state	Areas visited	Dates	Details	Image
Delaware	Wilmington	January 12	President Obama traveled to Wilmington, Delaware, to attend the funeral of Jean Biden, mother of Vice President Joe Biden.	
Massachusetts	Boston	January 17	President Obama traveled to Boston, Massachusetts, to campaign for Martha Coakley in the Senate special election.	
Ohio	Elyria	January 22	President Obama traveled to Elyria, Ohio, visiting the Lorain County Community College and emphasizing his political agenda.	
Florida	Tampa	January 28	President Obama traveled to MacDill Air Force Base in Tampa, Florida, where he met with crew helping with the humanitarian response to the 2010 Haiti earthquake, before holding a town hall meeting at the University of Tampa.	
Maryland	Baltimore	January 29	President Obama traveled to Baltimore, Maryland. While there, he toured local small businesses, delivered a speech on job tax credits, and met with members of the Republican Party.	

== February ==
Country/ U.S. state	Areas visited	Dates	Details	Image
New Hampshire	Nashua	February 2	President Obama traveled to Nashua, New Hampshire, touring small business before giving a speech at Nashua North High School.	
Maryland	Lanham	February 5	President Obama traveled to Lanham, Maryland, where he toured small businesses and delivered a speech on job creation.	
Virginia	Langley	February 5	President Obama traveled to Langley, Virginia, to visit the headquarters of the Central Intelligence Agency to honor victims of the Camp Chapman attack.	
Maryland	Lanham	February 16	President Obama traveled to Lanham, Maryland, where he discussed the future of nuclear power in the United States at a local chapter headquarters of the International Brotherhood of Electrical Workers.	
Colorado	Denver	February 18	President Obama traveled to Denver, Colorado. He delivered remarks at a fundraising rally and a fundraising reception for Senator Michael Bennet.	
Nevada	Las Vegas	February 18–19	President Obama traveled to Las Vegas, Nevada. He held a town hall meeting with Senate Majority Leader Harry Reid, and then delivered remarks to the Las Vegas Chamber of Commerce and the Las Vegas Convention and Visitors Authority.	
Maryland	Bethesda	February 28	President Obama traveled to Bethesda, Maryland, for a routine general medical examination at the National Naval Medical Center by Dr. Jeffrey Kuhlman and other physicians, who found the president to be "in excellent health." Obama later visited wounded soldiers at the hospital.	

== March ==
Country/ U.S. state	Areas visited	Dates	Details	Image
Georgia	Savannah	March 2	President Obama traveled to Savannah, Georgia, speaking at the Savannah Technical College and outlining his energy-efficiency program.	
Virginia	Arlington	March 5	President Obama traveled to Arlington, Virginia, discussing his Administration's policy and the economic situation at the headquarters of Opower, a corporation producing efficient energy use technology.	
Pennsylvania	Glenside	March 8	President Obama traveled to Glenside, Pennsylvania, where he discussed health care reform at Arcadia University.	
Missouri	St. Louis	March 10	President Obama traveled to St. Louis, Missouri, where he discussed his plans for health care reform.	
Maryland	Chevy Chase	March 13	President Obama traveled to Chevy Chase, Maryland, where he watched his daughter play basketball.	
Georgia	Atlanta	March 13	President Obama traveled to Atlanta to discuss his plans for overhaul of the American education system.	
Ohio	Strongsville	March 15	President Obama traveled to Strongsville, Ohio, where he discussed plans for health care overhaul.	
Virginia	Fairfax	March 19	President Obama spoke at George Mason University in Fairfax, Virginia, discussing his plans for health care reform.	
Iowa	Iowa City	March 25	President Obama spoke at the University of Iowa in Iowa City, Iowa, where he defended the newly signed Patient Protection and Affordable Care Act.	
Afghanistan	Bagram, Kabul	March 28	President Obama made a surprise visit to Afghanistan, flying on Air Force One from Camp David to Bagram Air Base, and then flew on by helicopter to the Presidential Palace in Kabul to meet with President Hamid Karzai to discuss the ongoing War in Afghanistan. During his visit, Obama also spoke with troops, and met with U.S. Ambassador Karl Eikenberry and General Stanley A. McChrystal. Obama previously visited eastern Afghanistan in July 2008, during his campaign in the 2008 presidential election.	
Virginia	Alexandria	March 30	President Obama signed the Health Care and Education Reconciliation Act of 2010 at Northern Virginia Community College in Alexandria, Virginia.	

== April ==
Country/ U.S. state	Areas visited	Dates	Details	Image
Maine	Portland	April 1	President Obama traveled to Portland, Maine, where he defended the recently signed Patient Protection and Affordable Care Act.	
Massachusetts	Framingham, Boston	April 1	President Obama made a surprise visit to an emergency management bunker in Framingham, Massachusetts, which was coordinating the response to torrential rains flooding nearby areas. Obama later attended two DNC fundraisers, including one at the Boston Opera House (1980).	
North Carolina	Charlotte	April 2	President Obama traveled to Charlotte, North Carolina, where he discussed jobs and the U.S. state of the economy.	
Czech Republic	Prague	April 8	President Obama traveled to Prague, Czech Republic, to sign the New START treaty with Russian President Dmitry Medvedev. Obama also took part in a formal dinner with the heads of government of eleven EU Member States: the Czech Republic plus Bulgaria, Croatia, Estonia, Hungary, Latvia, Lithuania, Poland, Romania, Slovakia and Slovenia.	
Florida	Merritt Island, Miami	April 15	President Obama traveled to the Kennedy Space Center, where he discussed future plans for space exploration. The President later spoke at a Democratic National Committee fundraiser in Miami.	
California	Los Angeles	April 19	President Obama spoke at a campaign event for Senator Barbara Boxer.	
New York	New York City	April 22	President Obama spoke on about his plan for financial regulation overhaul at Cooper Union.	
North Carolina	Asheville	April 23–25	President Obama and First Lady Michelle Obama travel to Asheville, North Carolina, for a weekend vacation.	
West Virginia	Beckley	April 25	President Obama traveled to Beckley, West Virginia, to speak at a memorial for miners lost at the Upper Big Branch Mine disaster.	
Iowa	Fort Madison, Mount Pleasant, Ottumwa	April 27	President Obama traveled to Fort Madison, Iowa, where he spoke about sustainable energy. The President later made a surprise visit to an organic farm in Mount Pleasant, and visited Ottumwa, where he spoke about financial regulation.	
Missouri	Monroe City, Macon, Palmyra	April 28	President Obama spoke with local residents as part of a continuing tour of the Midwest. The President later traveled to Macon, where he discussed financial regulation, and Palmyra, where he discussed the problems facing local farmers.	
Illinois	Quincy	April 28	As part of a continuing tour of the Midwest, President Obama spoke at Quincy, Illinois, where he discussed future financial regulation legislation in the Senate.	

== May ==
Country/ U.S. state	Areas visited	Dates	Details	Image
Michigan	Ann Arbor	May 1	President Obama traveled to Ann Arbor, Michigan, where he delivered the commencement speech to University of Michigan graduates at Michigan Stadium.	
Louisiana	Venice	May 2	President Obama traveled to Venice, Louisiana, while overseeing cleanup operations along the Gulf Coast in response to the Deepwater Horizon drilling rig explosion.	
Virginia	Hampton	May 9	President Obama traveled to Hampton, Virginia, where he delivered the commencement address at Hampton University.	
New York	Buffalo, New York City	May 13	President Obama traveled to Buffalo, New York, where he discussed economic recovery actions and progress. The President later spoke at 1 Police Plaza in New York City.	
Ohio	Youngstown	May 18	President Obama met workers at the V&M Star manufacturing plant in Youngstown, Ohio, and made a speech regarding economic recovery.	
New York	West Point	May 22	President Obama discussed a new national security doctrine to a graduating class at the United States Military Academy.	
California	San Francisco, Fremont	May 25–26	President Obama traveled to San Francisco, California, where he spoke at a fundraiser event for Senator Barbara Boxer. The President later spoke about the economy at a Solyndra manufacturing plant in Fremont.	
Louisiana	Kenner, New Orleans, Port Fourchon, Grand Isle	May 28	President Obama traveled to various parts of Louisiana to oversee the response to the Deepwater Horizon oil spill. He toured affected areas, and met with United States Coast Guard officials and politicians, including Louisiana Governor Bobby Jindal, Florida Governor Charlie Crist, and Louisiana Senators Mary Landrieu and David Vitter.	
Illinois	Elwood	May 31	President Obama traveled to Elwood, Illinois, where he planned to give a Memorial Day address at the Abraham Lincoln National Cemetery, although the speech was canceled as a result of a violent thunderstorm.	

== June ==
Country/ U.S. state	Areas visited	Dates	Details	Image
Pennsylvania	Pittsburgh	June 2	President Obama traveled to Pittsburgh, Pennsylvania, where he gave a speech about economic recovery at Carnegie Mellon University.	
Maryland	Hyattsville	June 4	President Obama traveled to Hyattsville, Maryland, where he gave a speech at a K. Neal International Trunks facility.	
Louisiana	Grand Isle, New Orleans	June 4	President Obama made another trip to Louisiana, where he discussed BP's response to the Deepwater Horizon oil spill. He discussed the situation at Grand Isle and Louis Armstrong International Airport in New Orleans.	
Michigan	Kalamazoo	June 7	President Obama traveled to Kalamazoo, Michigan, where he spoke at the commencement ceremony of Kalamazoo Central High School.	
Maryland	Wheaton	June 8	President Obama traveled to Wheaton, Maryland, where he discussed his health care reforms at the Holiday Park Multipurpose Senior Center, alongside Secretary of Health and Human Services Kathleen Sebelius.	
Mississippi	Gulfport	June 14	On his fourth trip to the Gulf states since the Deepwater Horizon oil spill, President Obama met with Admiral Thad Allen at Coast Guard Station Gulfport in Gulfport, Mississippi.	
Alabama	Theodore, Dauphin Island, Fort Morgan	June 14	President Obama traveled to Theodore, Alabama, as part of his fourth tour of Gulf states since the Deepwater Horizon oil spill, where he pronounced that seafood from the Gulf of Mexico was safe to eat. The President later oversaw clean-up efforts in Dauphin Island, before taking a ferry to Fort Morgan.	
Florida	Pensacola	June 14–15	President Obama traveled to Naval Air Station Pensacola in Pensacola, Florida, as part of his tour of the Gulf states. Obama discussed compensation he would expect from BP in response to the Deepwater Horizon oil spill.	
Ohio	Columbus	June 18	President Obama traveled to Columbus, Ohio, where he celebrated the creation of the 10,000th road construction project funded by the American Recovery and Reinvestment Act of 2009.	
Virginia	Arlington	June 24	President Obama and visiting Russian President Dmitry Medvedev had lunch at Ray's Hell Burger in Arlington, Virginia, before traveling to the White House.	
Canada	Huntsville, Toronto	June 25–27	President Obama traveled to Huntsville (in the Muskoka region) to attend the 36th G8 summit. President Obama later traveled to Toronto to attend the G-20 summit meeting.	
Wisconsin	Racine	June 30	President Obama traveled to Racine, Wisconsin, where he hosted a town hall meeting on the state of the economy at Memorial Hall. Before his speech, Obama also made a short surprise visit to O&H Danish Bakery in Racine, where he sampled kringle.	

== July ==
Country/ U.S. state	Areas visited	Dates	Details	Image
West Virginia	Charleston	July 2	President Obama traveled to Charleston, West Virginia to attend a funeral service for the late Senator Robert Byrd at the West Virginia State Capitol.	
Missouri	Kansas City	July 8	President Obama traveled to Kansas City, Missouri, where he talked about the economy, and spoke in support for Missouri Secretary of State Robin Carnahan at the Folly Theater, who is trying to win a Senate election.	
Nevada	Las Vegas	July 8–9	President Obama traveled to Las Vegas, Nevada, as part of an effort to help Senator Harry Reid win his re-election campaign, including speaking in support of him at the University of Nevada, Las Vegas.	
Michigan	Holland	July 15	President Obama traveled to Holland, Michigan, where he visited a factory of a subsidiary of LG Chem, which is to produce lithium batteries for the Chevrolet Volt.	
Maine	Bar Harbor, Tremont	July 16–18	President Obama and the First Family traveled to Bar Harbor, Maine for a weekend vacation, including a trip to Acadia National Park and the Bass Harbor Head Light in Tremont.	
New Jersey	Edison	July 28	President Obama spoke at a small businesses job initiative in Edison, New Jersey.	
Michigan	Detroit, Hamtramck	July 30	President Obama traveled to Detroit, Michigan, where he defended his response to the automotive industry crisis of 2008–2010. Obama spoke at the Chrysler Jefferson North Assembly factory. He also spoke at a General Motors plant in Hamtramck.	

== August ==
Country/ U.S. state	Areas visited	Dates	Details	Image
Georgia	Atlanta	August 2	President Obama traveled to Atlanta, Georgia where he spoke on a variety of foreign and domestic issues.	
Illinois	Chicago	August 5	President Obama traveled to Chicago, Illinois, where he helped raise funds for Illinois State Treasurer Alexi Giannoulias' senatorial election campaign. He also toured the Ford Motor Company Chicago Assembly Plant, highlighting his response to the automotive industry crisis of 2008–2010.	
Texas	Austin, Dallas	August 9	President Obama spoke at the University of Texas at Austin in Austin, Texas, and later in Dallas, defending the policies of his administration while raising funds for the Democratic Party.	
Florida	Panama City	August 14–15	President Obama, along with First Lady Michelle Obama and daughter Sasha Obama, traveled to Panama City, Florida, swimming in the Gulf of Mexico off the Panama City Beach. (Malia Obama, who was away at summer camp, did not attend.)	
Wisconsin	Menomonee Falls, Milwaukee	August 16	President Obama traveled to Menomonee Falls, Wisconsin, where he discussed sustainable energy manufacturing at ZBB Energy Corp., which is a producer of zinc-bromine flow batteries. The President later attended a fundraiser at the U.S. Cellular Arena for Mayor Tom Barrett, who is running for the Governorship.	
California	Los Angeles	August 16–17	President Obama traveled to the Hancock Park neighborhood of Los Angeles, California, where he attended a Democratic Congressional Campaign Committee fundraiser.	
Washington	Seattle	August 17	President Obama traveled to Seattle, Washington, where he met with small business owners at a bakery on Pioneer Square. The President later helped raise funds for Patricia Murray, who was campaigning for reelection as a Senator from Washington.	
Ohio	Columbus	August 17–18	President Obama traveled to Columbus, Ohio, where he spoke on the state of the economy in the Clintonville neighborhood. The President later helped raise funds for Governor Ted Strickland, who is campaigning for reelection.	
Florida	Miami	August 18	President Obama traveled to Miami, Florida, where helped chief financial officer Alex Sink in her campaign to be elected Governor of Florida.	
Massachusetts	Martha's Vineyard	August 19–28	President Obama and the First Family traveled to Martha's Vineyard – an island in Dukes County off of Cape Cod – as part of a vacation.	
Louisiana	New Orleans	August 29	President Obama traveled to New Orleans, Louisiana, where he spoke at the Xavier University of Louisiana on the fifth anniversary of Hurricane Katrina's landfall.	
Texas	El Paso	August 31	President Obama traveled to Fort Bliss in El Paso, Texas, where he talked to troops regarding the Iraq War.	

== September ==
Country/ U.S. state	Areas visited	Dates	Details	Image
Wisconsin	Milwaukee	September 6	President Obama traveled to Milwaukee, Wisconsin, where he delivered a speech discussing plans to improve American infrastructure at Henry Maier Festival Park.	
Ohio	Cleveland	September 8	President Obama traveled to Cleveland, Ohio, where he spoke at the Cuyahoga Community College about the state of the economic recovery.	
Virginia	Arlington County	September 11	President Obama attended a memorial ceremony at the Pentagon Memorial in Arlington County, Virginia, where he spoke on the ninth anniversary of the September 11 attacks.	
Virginia	Fairfax	September 13	President Obama traveled to Fairfax, Virginia, where he spoke about economic recovery efforts in a backyard.	
Pennsylvania	Philadelphia	September 14	President Obama traveled to the Julia R. Masterman School in Philadelphia, Pennsylvania, where he gave a back-to-school pep talk to the students there.	
Connecticut	Stamford, Greenwich	September 16	President Obama traveled to Stamford, Connecticut, to speak at a fundraiser for Connecticut Attorney General Richard Blumenthal's campaigning for election to the United States Senate. The President later attended a Democratic National Committee fundraiser in Greenwich, Connecticut.	
Pennsylvania	Philadelphia	September 20	President Obama traveled to Philadelphia, Pennsylvania, where he appeared at two fundraiser events for Representative Joe Sestak, who is campaigning to be elected Senator for Pennsylvania.	
New York	New York City	September 22–24	President Obama traveled to the United Nations Headquarters in New York City, where he announced changes to the relationship between the United States and the United Nations and discussed the Millennium Development Goals. He later addressed the United Nations General Assembly. The President attended a Democratic Congressional Campaign Committee fundraiser at the Roosevelt Hotel. The President later met with various foreign government officials, including Chinese Premier Wen Jiabao, Japanese Prime Minister Naoto Kan, Colombian President Juan Manuel Santos and leaders of ASEAN countries.	
New Mexico	Albuquerque	September 28	President Obama traveled to Albuquerque, New Mexico, where he discussed plans to improve education and the economy.	
Wisconsin	Madison	September 28	President Obama gave a speech at the University of Wisconsin-Madison in support of the Democratic National Committee.	
Iowa	Des Moines	September 29	President Obama gave a backyard speech in Des Moines, Iowa, defending the policies of his administration while rallying support for the Democratic Party.	
Virginia	Richmond	September 29	President Obama traveled to Richmond, Virginia, where he gave a speech at a recreation center to drum up support for the Democratic Party.	

== October ==
Country/ U.S. state	Areas visited	Dates	Details	Image
New Jersey	Cresskill	October 6	President Obama traveled to a private residence in Cresskill, New Jersey, where he spoke at a Democratic National Committee fundraiser and called for voters to support the Democratic Party.	
Maryland	Bowie	October 7	President Obama spoke at Bowie State University in Bowie, Maryland, where he gave a speech in support of Governor Martin O'Malley, who is seeking reelection.	
Illinois	Chicago	October 7	President Obama traveled to Chicago, Illinois, where he spoke at a fundraiser for Alexi Giannoulias, who is campaigning for election to the United States Senate.	
Maryland	Bladensburg	October 8	President Obama traveled to the town of Bladensburg, Maryland, where he discussed the state of economic recovery at a masonry factory.	
Pennsylvania	Philadelphia	October 10	President Obama traveled to Philadelphia, Pennsylvania, where he spoke at a Democratic National Committee rally.	
Florida	Coral Gables	October 11	President Obama traveled to Coral Gables, Florida, for a campaign event for the Democratic Party and Representative Ron Klein.	
Delaware	Wilmington	October 15	President Obama and Vice President Joe Biden traveled to Wilmington, Delaware, where they attended a rally/fundraiser at the Grand Opera House in support of Chris Coons and the DSCC.	
Massachusetts	Boston	October 16	President Obama traveled to Boston, Massachusetts, where he spoke at a rally in the Hynes Convention Center in support of Governor Deval Patrick's reelection.	
Ohio	Hunting Valley, Columbus	October 17	President Obama traveled to Hunting Valley, Ohio, where he attended a fundraiser for Governor Ted Strickland, who is seeking reelection. The President later hosted a rally at Ohio State University in Columbus.	
Maryland	Rockville	October 19	President Obama spoke at a Democratic Senatorial Campaign Committee (DSCC) dinner in Rockville, Maryland.	
Oregon	Portland	October 20	President Obama traveled to Portland, Oregon, where he held a rally at the Oregon Convention Center in support of former Governor John Kitzhaber, who is seeking reelection.	
Washington	Seattle	October 21	President Obama traveled to Seattle, Washington, where he discussed the state of the economy and women. He later hosted a rally at the University of Washington in support of Senator Patty Murray's reelection.	
California	Palo Alto, Atherton, Los Angeles, Glendale	October 21–22	President Obama traveled to Palo Alto, California, where he hosted a fundraiser for the Democratic National Committee at the private residence of Marissa Mayer, a senior Google employee. The President also raised funds in Atherton for San Francisco District Attorney Kamala Harris, who is looking to be elected the new California Attorney General. The President later hosted a fundraiser and a rally at the University of Southern California in Los Angeles to support the reelection of Senator Barbara Boxer. The President then traveled to Glendale, where he taped an interview with Univision Radio.	
Nevada	Las Vegas	October 22	President Obama traveled to Las Vegas, Nevada, where he hosted a rally which was organized by Rakitha Hettiarachchi [The Political Campaign Director of Nevada State Democratic Party] to support the reelection of Senate Majority Leader Harry Reid. The rally was considered as one of the most successful political rallies in the history of Nevada state politics.	
Minnesota	Minneapolis	October 23	President Obama traveled to Minneapolis, Minnesota, where he hosted a rally and fundraiser at the University of Minnesota for Mark Dayton, who was running for elected Governor of Minnesota.	
Rhode Island	Woonsocket, Providence	October 25	President Obama traveled to Woonsocket, Rhode Island, where he criticized the Republican Party and defended the policies of his Administration. The President later hosted a fundraiser for the DCCC at the Rhode Island Convention Center in Providence.	
Maryland	Beltsville	October 29	President Obama traveled to Beltsville, Maryland, where he toured a sheet metal factory, discussing the state of the economy.	
Virginia	Charlottesville	October 29	President Obama traveled to Charlottesville, Virginia, where he campaigned in support of Representative Tom Periello, who is campaigning for reelection.	
Pennsylvania	Philadelphia	October 30	President Obama traveled to Philadelphia, Pennsylvania, where he held a rally in support of fellow Democrats at Temple University.	
Connecticut	Bridgeport	October 30	President Obama traveled to Bridgeport, Connecticut, where he spoke at a Democratic rally at Arena at Harbor Yard.	
Illinois	Chicago	October 30	President Obama traveled to Chicago, Illinois, where he addressed a rally at the Midway Plaisance in support of Democratic candidates.	
Ohio	Cleveland	October 31	President Obama traveled to Cleveland, Ohio, where he spoke at a Democratic rally at Cleveland State University's Wolstein Center.	

== November ==
Country/ U.S. state	Areas visited	Dates	Details	Image
Mumbai, New Delhi	November 6–9	President Obama traveled to Mumbai, India, as part of a trip to Asia. The President commemorated the 2008 Mumbai attacks, visited the Mani Bhavan Museum, and hosted various business activities at the Oberoi Trident. The President later hosted a town hall meeting at St Xavier's College. During his stay in Mumbai, the President stayed at the Taj Mahal Palace & Tower, which had previously been a terrorist target. The President proceeded to New Delhi, where he visited Humayun's Tomb and met with Prime Minister Manmohan Singh. He also addressed the joint session of the Indian Parliament and participated in a state dinner hosted by Indian's president Pratibha Patil at the Rashtrapati Bhavan, the official residence of the president of India.		
Jakarta	November 9–10	President Obama traveled to Jakarta, Indonesia, as part of a four-country tour of Asia. The President had bilateral meetings with President Susilo Bambang Yudhoyono at the Istana Negara. Later in the trip, the President visited the Istiqlal Mosque, Jakarta and delivered a speech at the University of Indonesia as a follow-up to his 2009 A New Beginning speech.		
Seoul	November 10–12	President Obama traveled to Seoul, South Korea, as part of a four-country tour of Asia. While there, the President attended a Veterans Day ceremony at the Yongsan Garrison and had bilateral meetings with President Lee Myung-bak at the Blue House. The President later attended G-20 summit meeting at the COEX Convention & Exhibition Center.		
Tokyo, Yokohama, Kamakura	November 12–14	President Obama traveled after his arrival in Tokyo to Yokohama, Japan as part of a four-country tour of Asia. While in Yokohama, the President attended an APEC summit meeting with several national leaders held at the InterContinental Yokohama Grand Hotel and Pacifico Yokohama Conference Center. He also held bilateral talks with Prime Minister Naoto Kan on the sidelines of the summit making joint press announcements. The President visited the famous statue of Amida Buddha located at the temple of Kōtoku-in in the city of Kamakura.		
Lisbon	November 19–20	President Obama traveled to Lisbon, Portugal to attend to the NATO summit meeting. Obama met with President Aníbal Cavaco Silva at Belém Palace, and later held bilateral meetings with Prime Minister José Sócrates. The President later attended a meeting of the North Atlantic Council, meeting with Georgian President Mikheil Saakashvili on the sidelines.		
Indiana	Kokomo	November 23	President Obama and Vice President Biden arrived at Grissom Air Reserve Base before traveling to a Chrysler transmission plant in Kokomo, Indiana. Obama touts his administration's response to the automotive crisis. Obama and Biden also made surprise visits to the Kokomo Fire Department, Sycamore Elementary School, and Gingerbread House Bakery.	

== December ==
Country/ U.S. state	Areas visited	Dates	Details	Image
Afghanistan	Bagram	December 3	President Obama made a surprise visit to Afghanistan, where he thanked United States soldiers for their contributions to the war at Bagram Airfield outside Bagram, Parwān Province.	
North Carolina	Winston-Salem	December 6	President Obama traveled to Forsyth Technical Community College in Winston-Salem, North Carolina, calling for increased focus on science and education and saying that the United States faces another "Sputnik moment".	

== See also ==
- List of international presidential trips made by Barack Obama
- Lists of presidential trips made by Barack Obama
