= David R. Courtney =

David Courtney
- Born: David Richard Courtney; 21 September 1953 (age 72); Houston, Texas, United States
- Occupations: Musician, writer, film-maker, political activist
- Years active: 1979–present
- Notable work: Learning the Tabla, Fundamentals of Tabla, Learning the Sitar
- Political party: Green Party
- Spouse: Chandra Courtney (1978–present)
- Children: 2
- Parent(s): Cecil Joseph Courtney; Jo Ann Courtney
- Website: http://chandrakantha.com http://takingbackdemocracy.com

David Richard Courtney (born September 21, 1953) is an artist, writer, and political activist. He is best known for his writings on the South Asian hand drums known as the tabla. He made an unsuccessful bid for Texas State Senate under the Green Party of Texas in both the 2012 and 2014 race.

== Artistic career ==
He began his study of the Indian tabla in 1972. In January 1975 he enrolled in the Ali Akbar College of Music in California where he initially studied tabla but then studied pakhawaj under Zakir Hussain. In 1976 he moved to Hyderabad India and began studying tabla and pakhawaj under the late Shaik Dawood Khan. He remained a student until Shaik Dawood Khan's death in 1992. It was also during this period that he studied santur under the late Hassan Mohamad, and dilruba under Sayed-ur-Rehman Jigar. Later he also studied sarangi under Aslam Khan of Hyderabad. Mr. Courtney has worked on numerous CD, vinyl disks, stage performances, as well as performance tours and workshops. From 2003 to 2010 he was a co-producer and presenter for KPFT's world music program "Music Beyond Borders" in Houston.

After 2000, he began to turn his attention to the genre of music videos. In this regard he won awards at the Worldfest: Houston International Film Festival.

== Writer ==
David Courtney has over 60 publications spreading over the last 35 years. The majority of these works are on Indian music, computers, and musical technology.

== Politics ==
His political activism began in 2001 when he became involved in the anti-war movement that was a reaction to the war in Iraq. During this period he was on the steering committee of the "Houston Coalition for Justice Not War". He was also involved in the "Tejas Block" that protested at the 2004 Republican National Convention in New York. During this period he also began to be involved in voter registration activities in minority communities.

It was in 2004 that he started to make the transition from street level political activism to partisan politics. This transition began when he became active in Dennis Kucinich's failed bid for the US presidency. David remained active in the local Democratic Party until he switched to the Green Party in 2011. In both 2012 and 2014 he filed his candidacy for the Texas State Senate for District 17. He was unsuccessful in both of these bids. He also served for two years as the Treasurer of the Texas State Green Party.

== Personal life ==
In 1976 he married the Indian vocalist Chandra Courtney. They have two children, a son and a daughter.

== Partial list of publications ==
- 1980 Introduction to Tabla. Hyderabad, India: Anand Power Press.
- 1985 "Tabla Making in the Deccan". Percussive Notes. Vol 23 No 2: pp 33–34. Urbana: Percussive Arts Society.
- 1987 "Tata and his Kamakshi Vina". Experimental Musical Instruments. December: pp 5–9. Nicasia, CA :EMI
- 1988 "The Tabla Puddi". Experimental Musical Instruments. Vol 4 No 4: pp 12–16. Nicasio: EMI.
- 1989 "An Indian Music Specific Audio Driver". Journal of the Acoustical Society of India. Vol 17 No. 3&4: 269 272. Calcutta: ASI.
- 1991 "The Application of the C=64 to Indian Music: A Review", Syntax, June/July: pp. 8–9: Houston.
- 1991 Tuning the Tabla: A Psychoacoustic Perspective. Percussive Notes. Vol 29 No 3: pp 59–61. Urbana: Percussive Arts Society.
- 1992 New Approaches to Tabla Instruction. Percussive Notes. Vol 30 No 4: pp 27–29. Lawton OK: Percussive Arts Society.
- 1992 "Introduction to Spectrum Analysis" Experimental Musical Instruments. Vol 8, No 1: pp 18–22. Nicasio, CA.
- 1993 "Mrdangam et Tabla: un Contraste". Percussions: Cahier Bimensiel d'Études et d'Informations sur les Arts de la Percussion. Chailly-en-Biere, France: Vol 28, March/April * * * 1993; pp 11–14.
- 1993 "An Introduction to Tabla". Modern Drummer. Mt. Morris, IL: October 1993; Vol 17, #10: pp. 38–84.
- 1993 "Repair and Maintenance of Tabla", Percussive Notes, Lawton OK: October 1993; Vol.31, No 7: pp 29–36.
- 1994 "The Cadenza in North Indian Tabla". Percussive Notes, Lawton OK: August 1994; Vol.32, No 4: pp 54–64.
- 1995 "The Cyclic Form in North Indian Tabla", Percussive Notes, Lawton OK: August 1994; Vol.33, No 6: pp 32–45.
- 1995 Fundamentals of Tabla. Houston TX: Sur Sangeet Services.
- 2000 Advanced Theory of Tabla. Houston TX: Sur Sangeet Services.
- 2001 Manufacture and Repair of Tabla. Houston TX: Sur Sangeet Services.
- 2001 Learning the Tabla (Volume 1). Pacific MO: Mel Bay Publications.
- 2003 Focus on the Kaidas of Tabla. Houston TX: Sur Sangeet Services.
- 2009 Learning the Sitar. Pacific MO: Mel Bay Publications.
- 2009 Learning the Tabla (Volume 2). Pacific MO: Mel Bay Publications.
- 2012 An American in Hyderabad.
- 2015 The Music of South Asia.
- 2023 Elementary North Indian vocal (Vols 1 & 2) (latest edition).
- 2023 History of Valhalla (2nd edition).
- 2023 “Signal Processing in Music Production: The Death of High Fidelity and the Art of Spoilage”, in Computer Assisted Music and Dramatics: Possibilities and Challenges, Ambuja Salgaonkar & Makarand Velankar (eds.). Advances in Intelligent Systems and Computing, Book 1444, Springer, 2023, pp. 221–229.

== Partial discography ==
- 1977 Folk Songs of India (Anasuya – Seetha in USA)
- 1981 Darshan Dena
- 1982 Three Ragas
- 1983 Live at the SYDA
- 1984 Gazal-Hyderabad
- 1985 Two Friends
- 1986 Kavita o Kavita
- 1988 Sangeet Sagar (Vol 1)
- 1989 Sangeet Sagar (Vol 2)
- 1989 Shraddha Suman
- 1989 Theme music to Asiana (Weekly TV Program)
- 1990 Jugal Bandhi
- 1998 Amrit
- 1998 Realm of Raga Rock
- 2000 Bhairavi Bhairav
- 2001 Live at the Stafford Civic Centre
- 2003 Sri Lalitha Sahasranama
- 2006 Devi Stotra Kadamba Mala

== Partial filmography ==
- 2005 Dancing in Twilight (contributed music)
- 2010 Brindavani Sarang (director/music director)
- 2011 Gayatri Mantra in Nava Raga (Rain)(director/music director)
- 2011 Jaijaivanti Tarana (director/music director)

== Major awards ==
- 1996 – Award of Excellence from the American Telugu Association
- 2009 – Cultural Jewel of India from the Indian Cultural Centre (Houston)
- 2011 – Bronze "Remi" Award (Experimental film and Video) from Worldfest Houston (Houston International Film Festival)
- 2012 – Gold "Remi" Award (World Music/Techno) from Worldfest Houston (Houston International Film Festival)
- 2015 – Sunshine Awards.
