= V. G. Jog =

Indian musician (1922–2004)

- Born: Vishnu Govind Jog; 2 February 1922; Wai, Satara District, Maharashtra
- Died: 31 January 2004 (aged 81); Kolkata, West Bengal, India
- Education: Bhatkhande Music Institute
- Occupation: Violinist

Vishnu Govind Jog, better known as V. G. Jog (22 February 1922 – 31 January 2004), was an Indian violinist. He was a proponent of the violin in the Hindustani music tradition in the 20th century, and is credited for introducing this instrument into Hindustani music.

== Early life ==
Born in Wai, Maharashtra in 1922, he received instruction from S. C. Athavale and the late Ganpat Rao Purohit. Jog began playing the violin at the age of twelve and was subsequently trained by some of the musicians of India, like Ustad Allauddin Khan and Pandit S. N. Ratanjankar. Sri Lanka's Pandith W.D. Amaradeva studied under Jog.

== Career ==
Jog earned a master's degree in music from Bhatkhande Music Institute in Lucknow in 1944 and went on to teach there. He also taught at the Ali Akbar College of Music. He performed and recorded with many Hindustani musicians of the 20th century (including Bismillah Khan) and toured the world. He frequently performed for All India Radio's Calcutta division.

He joined All India Radio in 1953 and served as a music producer. He has gone on tours to foreign countries and issued many LP and EP gramophone records of both solo performances and jugalbandi with sangeet maestros. He toured both in India and abroad, mainly in East Africa, Nepal, Sri Lanka, United Kingdom, France, the United States, and West Germany. In 1985, he performed at the Festival of India in the United States

He received many honors from various cultural institutions, including the Padma Bhushan in 1983 by the president of India Sangeet Natak Academy award in 1980. By the time he retired he had become the deputy chief producer of All India Radio.

== Personal life ==
Beginning in 1999, he suffered from Parkinson's disease, and also suffered from respiratory problems in his later years. After prolonged illness Pandit Jog died on 31 Jan 2004 in South Calcutta. Every year on January 31 a concert is held in Kolkata by Swarsadhana, an organisation founded in his memory by his disciple Pt.Pallab Bandyopadhyay.

== Awards and honours ==
- The Padma Bhushan,
- Sangeet Natak Akademi Award,
- Rajya Natak Award by West Bengal Government,
- Kalidas Samman,
- Bhuwalka Puraskar,
- Hafiz Ali Khan award.

and numerous others.
