= Buddhadev Das Gupta =

Indian classical musician (1933–2018)

Pandit Buddhadev Das Gupta
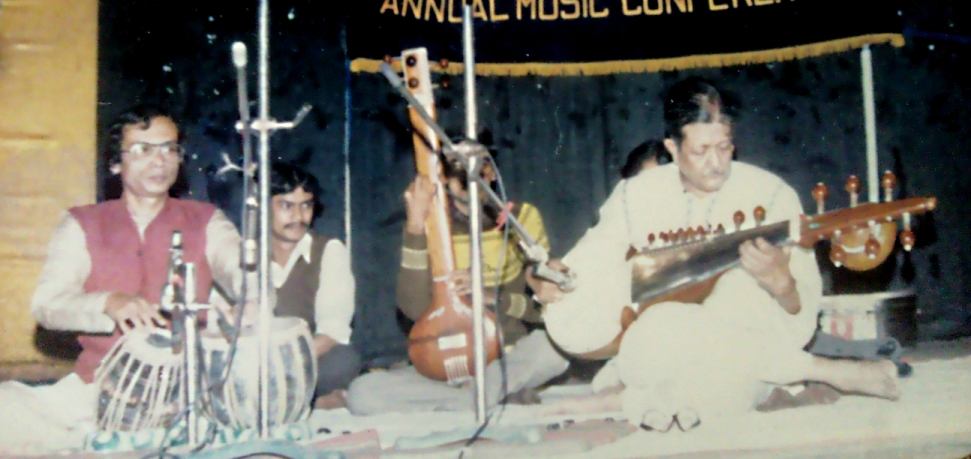
- Das Gupta at a concert accompanied by Pandit Chandra Nath Shastri with tabla, Calcutta, 1987.

Background information
- Born: 1 February 1933; Bhagalpur, Bihar and Orissa Province, British India
- Died: 15 January 2018 (aged 84) Kolkata, West Bengal, India
- Genre: Hindustani classical
- Occupation: Musicians
- Instrument: sarod
- Label: Nimbus Records
- Formerly of: Chandra Nath Shastri; Radhika Mohan Maitra; All India Radio
- Website: www.buddhadevdasgupta.com

Buddhadev Das Gupta (1 February 1933 – 15 January 2018) was an Indian classical musician who played the sarod. He used to reside in Kolkata, India. He was one of the artists featured in Nimbus Records' The Raga Guide.

== Early life and training ==
Das Gupta was born on 1 February 1933 at his maternal home at Bhagalpur, India to Prafulla Mohan Dasgupta and Bhabani Dasgupta. His father was a District Magistrate by profession and an avid lover of music although he never learnt music.

Das Gupta stood second in the Matriculation examination, held in 1948. He then studied mechanical engineering at the Bengal Engineering College, Shibpur and stood second there, too. Much later in life, on 16 February 2010, the university awarded him an honorary D.Litt. degree.

At a very early age, Buddhadev started taking sarod lessons from the sarod maestro Radhika Mohan Maitra. His first program on the All India Radio was as a guest artist. He eventually performed more than 17 national programs on All India Radio.

== Felicitation ==
In 2011, Das Gupta turned down the Padma Shri award by the Government of India, saying "it is far too late in the day". In January 2012, he was given the Padma Bhushan. He was awarded Sangeet Natak Akademi Award in 1993 and Sangeet Natak Akademi Tagore Ratna in 2011.

== Autobiography ==
His autobiography Bamaner Chandrasparshavilash (meaning: "The desire of a dwarf to touch the moon"), was periodically published in a Bengali Magazine "Disha" and has been published in the form of book in 2004 (part-I) and in 2010 (part-II).

== Disciples ==
Buddhadev Das Gupta was the Guru of many established and prominent musicians like Bhabanisankar Dasgupta, Anirban Dasgupta, Abanindra Maitra, Joydeep Ghosh, Atanu Raksit, Debashish Bhattacharya, Debasmita Bhattacharya, Prattyush Banerjee, Sugato Nag, Abir Hossain, Soumik Datta, Swarnendu Mandal, Arka Roy, Shounak Roy and many more.

== Death ==
Das Gupta died on 15 January 2018 of cardiac arrest at his residence in South Kolkata. He was 84. He had been suffering from respiratory problems for the last few days. At the time of his death, he was survived by wife and two sons. West Bengal Chief Minister Mamata Banerjee said his death has created a void in the field of classical music. "A great loss for the world of classical music. Rest in Peace. Condolences to his family," she said in a tweet.
