= Kishan Maharaj =

Pandit Kishan Maharaj
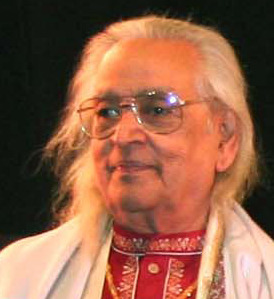
- Born: Kishan Hari Maharaj; 3 September 1923; Kabir Chaura, Benares, United Provinces of Agra and Oudh, British India
- Died: 4 May 2008 (aged 84); Khajuri, Uttar Pradesh, India
- Occupation: Hindustani Classical Tabla player
- Years active: 1934-2008
- Parent(s): Hari Maharaj (father); Anjora Devi (mother)
- Musical career
- Instrument: Tabla

Pandit Kishan Maharaj (3 September 1923 – 4 May 2008) was an Indian tabla player who belonged to the Benares gharana of Hindustani classical music.

== Early life and background ==
Maharaj was born to a Brahmin family of hereditary musicians in Kabir Chaura, Benaras. His father was Hari Maharaj and his mother was Anjora Devi. He was adopted by his father's older brother, Kanthe Maharaj, who did not have children of his own.

Maharaj's musical guidance was initiated by his father. Maharaj was six years old when his father died. Afterwards, Maharaj's musical training continued with Kanthe Maharaj and lasted for five years.

== Musical career ==
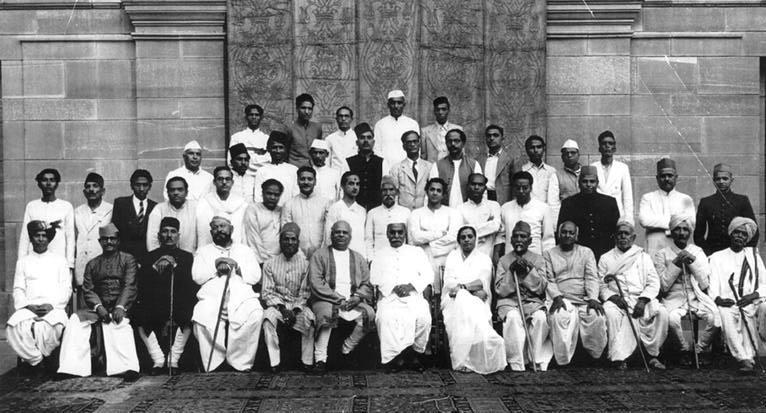
Kishan Maharaj standing (second row, eighth from left) with other leading musicians in 1948.

Maharaj began performing in concerts by age 11. He moved to Bombay in 1944 to pursue a music career and initially struggled. He provided tabla accompaniment to Sitara Devi in the Hindi film Badi Maa (1945).

Within a few years, Kishan Maharaj was sharing the stage with leading classical musicians like Faiyaz Khan, Omkarnath Thakur, Bade Ghulam Ali Khan, Bhimsen Joshi, Ravi Shankar, Ali Akbar Khan, Vasant Rai, Vilayat Khan, Girija Devi, and many others.

Celebrated as a leading tabla soloist, Maharaj also gave sangat to dancers like Shambhu Maharaj, Sitara Devi, Gopi Krishna, and Birju Maharaj.

Maharaj also performed alongside celebrated tabla maestros like Samta Prasad (his uncle), Alla Rakha, and Karamatullah Khan.

His Taal Vadya Kacheri performances with Carnatic percussionist Palghat R. Raghu were celebrated.

Among all his compositions, his "Tala Vadya Kacheri" with the Mridangam Vidwan, "Palghat Raghu" stood out. Maharaj extensively toured and participated in several prestigious events across the world, including the Edinburgh Festival and the Commonwealth Arts festival in the United Kingdom in 1965. He has toured across the UK, USSR, Switzerland, Poland, Yugoslavia, and Czechoslovakia.

== Artistry ==
Maharaj had the ability to play cross-rhythms and produce complex calculations, particularly in tihai patterns. Known as an excellent accompanist, Maharaj was extremely versatile and capable of playing with any accompaniment, be it with the Sitar, Sarod, Dhrupad, Dhamar or even dance.

== Death ==
Maharaj died on 4 May 2008 at Khajuri near Varanasi, aged 84.

== Legacy ==
Maharaj trained many disciples, several of whom have become prominent musicians. This includes:

- Pooran Maharaj (son)
- Kumar Bose
- Sukhvinder Singh Namdhari
- Balkrishna Iyer
- Ranesh Mishra
- Sandeep Das
- Arvind Kumar Azad
- Sanju Sahai
- Vineet Vyas
- Shubh Maharaj (Grandson)

== Personal life ==
In 1947, Maharaj married Veena Devi, niece of a Tabla maestro of the Benaras Gharana, Pandit Anokhelal Mishra. They have a son, Pooran Maharaj, who is also a tabla player.

== Awards and recognition ==
Maharaj was awarded the Padma Shri in 1973 and the Padma Vibhushan in 2002.
