= Mahadev Prasad Mishra =

Indian Thumri Singer

- Born: Varanasi, United Provinces of Agra and Oudh, India
- Occupations: singer; composer

Mahadev Prasad Mishra (1906 – 13 December 1995) was an Indian thumri singer from Benares (Varanasi).

== Career ==
He was accompanied many times by Baccha Lal Mishra on sarangi and Ishwar Lal Mishra on tabla.

== Death ==
Mishra died on 13 December 1995 at the age of 88.
