= Yogesh Samsi =

Indian tabla player (born 1968)

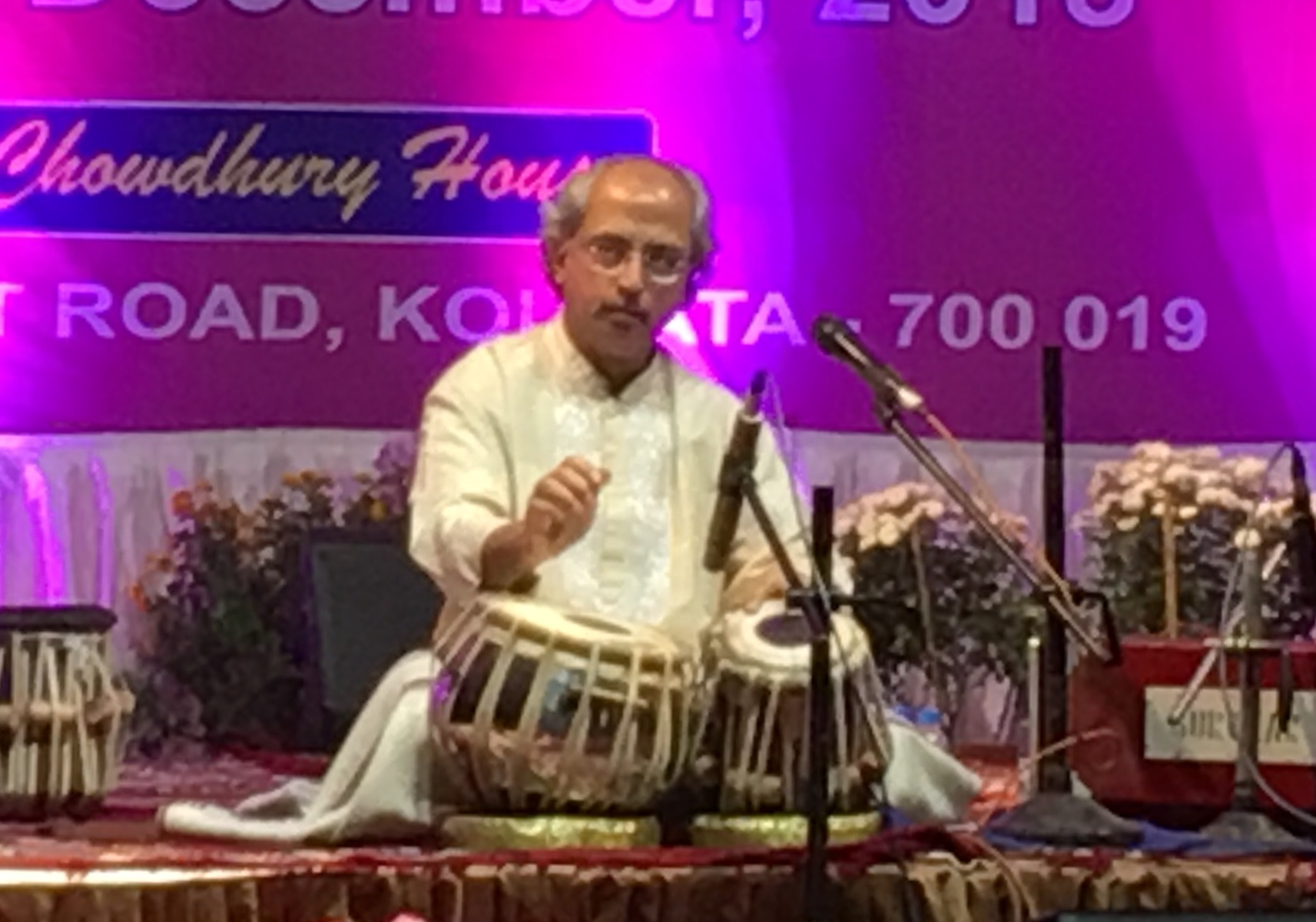
- Samsi at the Chowdhury House Music Conference in 2018

Background information
- Genre: Hindustani classical music
- Occupation: Musician
- Instrument: Tabla
- Years active: From 1991
- Website: www.yogeshsamsi.com

Yogesh Samsi (born 17 November 1968) is an Indian tabla player.

== Early life ==
Yogesh Samsi was born in Delhi to renowned vocalist Pandit Dinkar Kaikini. Yogesh's father introduced him to music at the age of four. At the age of four he started learning the tabla from Pandit H. Taranath Rao. Later, he sought the guidance of Ustad Allah Rakha , one of the greatest percussionists and father of renowned tabla player Zakir Hussain. He spent 23 years under the tutelage of Allarakha.

== Career ==
Pt. Samsi has accompanied the top grade instrumentalists and vocalists and dancers of India, including Vilayat Khan, Ajoy Chakrabarty, Dinkar Kaikini, Bhimsen Joshi, Shivkumar Sharma, Hariprasad Chaurasia, Ken Zuckerman, Birju Maharaj, Pandit Ulhas Kashalkar and Ustad Rashid Khan. He strives to keep up his revered guru's word of preserving the tradition in the presentation of tabla solo. He also appeared in the first episode of Idea Jalsa with Shivkumar Sharma.

== Awards ==
- Sangeet Natak Akademi Award for Tabla - 2017
