= Samta Prasad =

Indian musician (1921–1994)

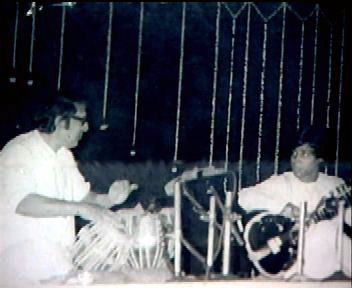
- Samta Prasad accompanying sitar player Shahid Parvez Khan

Background information
- Also known as: Gudai Maharaj
- Born: Samta Prasad Mishra; 20 July 1921
- Origin: Varanasi, Uttar Pradesh
- Died: 31 May 1994 (aged 72)
- Genres: Indian classical music
- Instrument: Tabla

Samta Prasad (Hindi : पण्डित सामता प्रसाद; 20 July 1921 – 31 May 1994) was an Indian classical musician and tabla player from the Benares gharana. He played tabla in many Hindi films including, Meri Surat Teri Ankhen (1963) and Sholay (1975), and film music composers Rahul Dev Burman and Bappi Lahiri were his disciples.

He was the son of Hari Sundarrr, also known as Bachaa Mishra, his grandfather was Jagannath Mishra, and his ancestors included Pratap Maharaj, also known as Gudai Maharaj.

He was awarded the Sangeet Natak Akademi Award in 1979, given by the Sangeet Natak Akademi, India's National Academy of Music, Dance & Drama and the Padma Bhushan, the third highest civilian honour given by Govt. of India in 1991.

== Early life and training ==
Pandit Samta Prasad was born on 20 July 1921, in Kabir chaura, Banaras (Varanasi), Uttar Pradesh into a family steeped in the tradition of tabla and pakhawaj of Benaras gharana, sometimes referred as Poorab baaj school.

His preliminary taalim (training) began with his father, who died when Samta Prasad Ji was just seven. Thereafter, he took the discipleship of Bikku Maharaj, himself a disciple of Baldev Sahai, and began to practice for long hours daily.

== Career ==
Pt. Samta Prasad gave his first major performance at the "Allahabad Sangeet Sammelan" in 1942, where he impressed the musicians present there, and soon established himself as an accompanist as well as a soloist.

Throughout his career, he performed in various parts of India, such as Kolkata, Mumbai, Chennai and Lucknow. He also represented the Indian cultural team while abroad, in such places as France, Russia and Edinburgh.

He also played the tabla in Hindi films like, Jhanak Jhanak Payal Baje, Meri Surat Teri Ankhen, Basant Bahar, Asamapta and Sholay. It is believed that music director, S.D. Burman postponed the recording of the song, "Nache mora manwa magan tikta dhighi dhighi" being sung by Mohd. Rafi in the film Meri Surat Teri Aakhen until the arrival of Pandit Samta Prasad from Banaras.

He died from a heart attack on May 31, 1994 in Pune, India. He was on a visit to Pune to conduct a coaching workshop organized by Naad Roop.

== Awards and recognitions ==
He was awarded "Padma Shri" in the year 1972, and received the "Sangeet Natak Akademi Award" in 1979 and the President Scholarship in 1987. He achieved the Padma Bhushan in 1991.

== Disciples ==
Amongst his noted disciples are Pandit Bhola Prasad Singh, Patna, Pandit Shashanka Shekhar Bakshi, Nitin Chatterjee, Naba Kumar Panda, Rahul Dev Burman (R.D.Burman, Gurmit Singh Virdee, Partha Sarathi Mukherjee, Satyanarayan Bashisht, (Late) Pandit Chandrakant Kamat, Pt. Manikrao Popatkar and Pt. Samta Prasad's son - (Late) Pandit Kumar Lal Mishra who died recently, a noted tabla player himself. Famous composer Bappi Lahiri was his disciple too.
