= Nikhil Banerjee =

Pandit Nikhil Banerjee Padma Bhushan
- Born: 14 October 1931; Calcutta, Bengal Presidency, British India
- Origin: Calcutta, India
- Died: 27 January 1986 (aged 54) Calcutta, West Bengal, India
- Genre: Hindustani classical music
- Occupations: Composer, sitarist
- Instruments: Sitar

Pandit Nikhil Ranjan Banerjee (14 October 1931 – 27 January 1986) was an Indian classical sitarist of the Maihar Gharana. Along with Pandit Ravi Shankar and Ustad Vilayat Khan, he emerged as one of the leading exponents of the sitar. He was a recipient of the Indian civilian honour of the Padma Bhushan.

== Early life ==
Nikhil Banerjee was born in 1931 into a Brahmin family in Calcutta, Bengal Presidency, British India. Belonging to the priestly class, taking up music as a professional career was traditionally discouraged in his family, as music was not considered a respectable profession for educated families at the time. Despite these social restrictions, Banerjee's interest in the sitar developed during early childhood by listening to his father, an amateur sitar player, practice daily.

Banerjee faced early resistance from his extended family under the joint family system, particularly from his grandfather, who was concerned that musical studies would compromise his formal education. At around five years of age, his father bought him a small sitar. By the age of seven, his father began systematically training him in scales and musical fundamentals.

Banerjee was regarded as a child prodigy. He won the All-Bengal Sitar Competition and made his public performance and broadcasting debut at age nine, becoming the youngest musician employed by All India Radio in Calcutta. Due to school commitments and strict family discipline, his early public performances were largely confined to the vicinity of Bengal.

== Musical Education ==
Banerjee's early training took place under financial constraints, as his father supported a large family of twelve children. Consequently, Banerjee received informal, short-term guidance from several visiting musicians and amateur masters in his youth.

He received preliminary sitar instruction from Mushtaq Ali Khan for approximately three months. He also studied rhythm (tabla) and vocal music under Jnan Prakash Ghosh. Later, he spent several years learning from Birendra Kishore Roy Chowdhury, a prominent musicologist and amateur musician from a royal family. Roy Chowdhury, who specialized in the traditional dhrupad style and rare instruments such as the sursringar and rabab, taught Banerjee numerous rare compositions passed down from classical lineages.

During his formative years, Banerjee was heavily exposed to classical vocalists and instrumentalists at Indian music festivals. He cited vocalists such as Omkarnath Thakur, Faiyaz Khan, Kesarbai Kerkar, and Amir Khan as major influences. Amir Khan taught Banerjee's sister in the mid-1940s, allowing the young Banerjee to absorb his vocal style during household lessons.

=== At Maihar ===
Recognizing that Banerjee required advanced, professional technique beyond what he could offer, Birendra Kishore Roy Chowdhury suggested that he seek tutelage under Allauddin Khan of the Maihar gharana. In 1947, around the age of 14 or 15, Banerjee repeatedly approached Allauddin Khan during the master's visits to music festivals in Calcutta. Initially, Khan rejected Banerjee's requests to become his student, citing his advanced age (around 70 at the time) and his desire to rest after having already trained major disciples such as Ali Akbar Khan and Ravi Shankar.

Before leaving Calcutta, Khan agreed to listen to one of Banerjee's upcoming broadcasts on All India Radio. After tuning in from Maihar, Khan wrote a letter to Banerjee. While strongly criticizing the performance's structural errors and misapplied ornamentation, Khan acknowledged Banerjee's underlying musical capability and invited him to Maihar. Banerjee subsequently relocated to Maihar in Madhya Pradesh to undergo rigorous, traditional training under Khan.

Beginning in 1947, Banerjee spent approximately five years in residence with Allauddin Khan at Maihar, living as a member of his household under the traditional guru–shishya tradition. The training regime was rigorous, with practice sessions lasting up to 14 hours a day, starting as early as four in the morning and running late into the night. Khan placed a strong emphasis on individualized instruction and adapted his teaching to suit each student's temperament. Banerjee noted that Khan intentionally guided his artistic development along a distinct path from his fellow Maihar disciple, Ravi Shankar, tailoring unique compositions and phrasing to match Banerjee's introspective nature. During the initial training period, Khan prioritized technical scales, rhythmic mastery, and compositions, forbidding Banerjee from performing the expansive, meditative alap section until he had reached greater personal maturity. Furthermore, Khan restricted his students from performing publicly or listening to outside music during their foundational period to preserve their focus and stylistic purity. While Khan primarily taught through vocal singing rather than demonstration on the sitar, he encouraged his disciples to devise their own fingering and technical solutions for complex phrases, fostering individual artistic expression. After his formal residence in Maihar, Banerjee continued his studies under Khan's son, sarod virtuoso Ali Akbar Khan, and Khan's daughter, Annapurna Devi.

== Inspiration and critical acclaim ==
In an interview Nikhil said he had been influenced by Allauddin Khan, Ali Akbar Khan, Amir Khan, and to a lesser extent by Omkarnath Thakur, Faiyaz Khan, Kesarbai Kerkar, and Roshanara Begum.

For Banerjee, music-making was a spiritual rather than a worldly path:

Indian music is based on spiritualism; that is the first word, you must keep it in your mind. Many people misunderstand and think it's got something to do with religion—no, absolutely no! Nothing to do with religion, but spiritualism—Indian music was practised and learned to know the Supreme Truth. Mirabai, Thyagaraja from the South, Haridas Swami, Baiju—all these great composers and musicians were wandering saints; they never came into society, nor performed in society.

Nikhil Banerjee is revered for his mastery in both melodic and rhythmic aspects of Indian music. His unique style of sitar playing is considered to have completeness, emotion and depth. His interpretation of ragas was usually traditional, although he is credited with creating at least two new ragas. His usage of a completely "bandh" or "closed" jawari in the Maihar style sitar allowed for a much greater amount of sustain (since the strings are not buzzing against the bridge as much) as can be heard in his unique sound. Though his strings do not sound as "closed" as Ustad Vilayat Khan's sitar playing, it was only due to the technical differences in their physical sitars (and jawari was changed specifically for the Jor strings etc.) that the sitars sounded in "different" style.

According to the San Francisco Chronicle, Banerjee's "technique is a phenomenon, faster than cheetahs, more secure than the dollar." Music and Musicians observed that "his improvisations always sound completely natural and spontaneous." In an obituary the New York Times wrote "the extraordinary fluidity and assurance of his rhythmic ideas and phrasing set a standard that would have left the more international 'stars' of Indian music behind."

== Partial discography ==
The following is a summary of some recent CD issues. A more comprehensive discography can be found in the external links.

- Afternoon Ragas (1970), released in 1992
- Live: Misra Kafi (1982)
- The Hundred-Minute Raga: Purabi Kalyan (live) (1982)
- Immortal Sitar of Pandit Nikhil Banerjee, Ragas: Purabi Kalyan, Zila-Kafi, Kirwa (1986)
- Lyrical Sitar (1991)
- Live at De Kosmos: Amsterdam 1972 (1995)
- The KPFA Tapes: Berkeley 1968 (1995)
- Rag Hemant (1995)
- Le Sitar Du Pandit (1996)
- Raga Patdeep (1996)
- Live in Amsterdam 1984 (1997)
- Genius of Pandit Nikhil (live) (1998)
- Berkeley 1968 (1998)
- Live Concert, Vol. 2: India's Maestro of Melody (1999)
- Pandit Nikhil Banerjee (live) (1999)
- Total Absorption (2000)
- Banerjee Live in Munich 1980 (2000)
- Morning Ragas: Bombay Complete Concert 1965 (live) (2000)
- Musician's Musician (2001)
- India's Maestro of Melody: Live Concert, Vol. 5 (2002)
- Alltime Classic, Vol. 1: Raag Bageshree (live) (2004)
- Pratibha: Sony Music(Live) (2011)
