= Ali Akbar Khan =

Hindustani musician (1922–2009)

Ustad Ali Akbar Khan
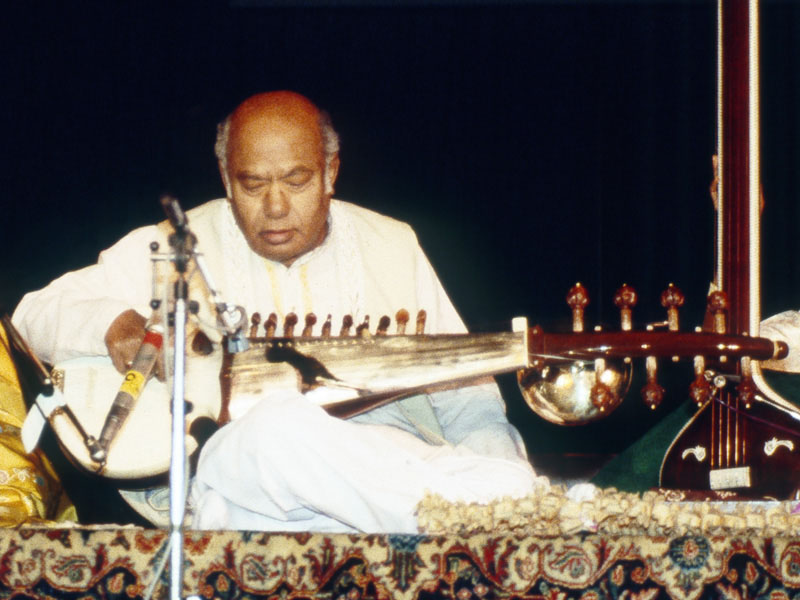
- Born: 14 April 1922; Shibpur, Bengal Presidency, British India
- Died: 18 June 2009 (aged 87); San Anselmo, California, U.S.
- Occupations: Composer; Sarodiya
- Children: at least 11, including Aashish
- Father: Allauddin Khan
- Musical career
- Origin: Maihar, Madhya Pradesh, India
- Genre: Hindustani classical music
- Instrument: Sarod

Ustad Ali Akbar Khan (14 April 1922 – 18 June 2009) was an Indian Hindustani classical musician of the Maihar gharana and one of the foremost exponents of the sarod. Renowned for his virtuosity, melodic invention, and the emotional depth and intensity of his playing, Khan was among the most celebrated Indian classical musicians of the twentieth century. Trained from childhood by his father, Ustad Allauddin Khan, he and his younger sister, the celebrated surbahar maestro Annapurna Devi, became leading inheritors of their father's musical tradition. Violinist Yehudi Menuhin described Ali Akbar Khan as "an absolute genius" and "the greatest musician in the world".

Khan's playing combined formidable technique with an austere, deeply expressive style. Rather than relying on outward display, he was noted for drawing extraordinary intensity, emotional depth, and tonal color from individual notes and simple melodic passages. His improvisations were distinguished by their melodic inventiveness and by an exceptional command of the expressive possibilities of the sarod.

Khan was also a composer of several new ragas. Among the best known are Raga Chandranandan ("moonstruck"), which he created by drawing on four evening ragas (Malkauns, Chandrakauns, Nandakauns, and Kaushi Kanada) and Gauri Manjari. Khan also composed film scores, including for Satyajit Ray's Devi (1960) and the early Merchant–Ivory film The Householder (1963).

Khan was a pioneer in popularizing Indian classical music in the West. On his first visit to the United States in 1955, at Menuhin's invitation, he recorded Music of India: Morning and Evening Ragas on 18 April at a Museum of Modern Art guest house in New York and performed at the museum the following day. The resulting Angel Records release is generally described as the first album of Indian classical music issued in the West.

Khan was also an influential teacher of Indian classical music. He founded the first Ali Akbar College of Music in Calcutta in 1956. Khan later settled in California and was an adjunct professor of music at the University of California, Santa Cruz. In 1967, he established an American college in Berkeley, California, which subsequently moved to San Rafael. In 1985 he founded a third branch in Basel, Switzerland. The college in San Rafael remains active as a center for the teaching and preservation of North Indian classical music.

Khan was accorded India's second highest civilian honour, the Padma Vibhushan, in 1989. Nominated five times for the Grammy Award, he was also a recipient of the MacArthur Fellowship and the National Endowment for the Arts' National Heritage Fellowship.

== Childhood and training ==
Ali Akbar Khan was born on 14 April 1922 in the village of Shibpur, Brahmanbaria, in present-day Bangladesh, to musician and teacher, Ustad Allauddin Khan and Madina Begum. Soon after his birth, Khan's family returned to Maihar (in present-day Madhya Pradesh, India) where his father was the primary court musician for the Maharaja of the princely state.

From an early age Khan received training from his father in various instruments as well as vocal composition, but finally gravitated towards the sarod. Allauddin was a perfectionist and a strict taskmaster, and Khan's lessons started before dawn and often lasted 18 hours a day. Khan also learned to play the tabla and the pakhavaj from his uncle, Aftabuddin Khan, who he visited at Shibpur. During this period he met several prominent musicians, such as the sarodist Timir Baran and flautist Pannalal Ghosh, who came to study with his father; in later years he was joined in his lessons by his sister Annapurna Devi, who became an accomplished player of the surbahar, and fellow student Ravi Shankar. Shankar and Annapurna Devi were married in 1941.

Of his training on the sarod, he wrote:

If you practice for ten years, you may begin to please yourself, after 20 years you may become a performer and please the audience, after 30 years you may please even your guru, but you must practice for many more years before you finally become a true artist—then you may please even God.

== Career ==
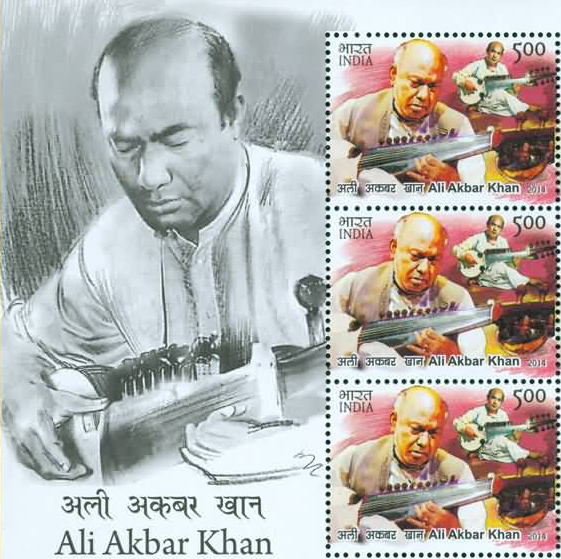
Khan on a 2014 stamp sheet of India

Khan, after years of rigorous training, gave his debut performance at a music conference in Allahabad in 1936, at the age of 13. Three years later, in December 1939, he accompanied Ravi Shankar on the sarod during the latter's debut performance at the same conference; this was the first of many jugalbandis (duets) between the two musicians. In 1938 Khan gave his first recital on All India Radio (AIR), Bombay (accompanied on the tabla by Alla Rakha), and starting in January 1940, he gave monthly performances on AIR, Lucknow. Finally in 1944, both Shankar and Khan left Maihar to start their professional careers as musicians; Shankar went to Bombay, while Khan became the youngest music director for AIR, Lucknow, and was responsible for solo performances and composing for the radio orchestra.

In 1943, on his father's recommendation, Khan was appointed a court musician for the Maharaja of Jodhpur, Umaid Singh. There, he taught and composed music besides giving recitals and was accorded the title of Ustad by the Maharaja. When the princely states were wound down with India's independence in 1947 and Maharaja Hanwant Singh died in a plane crash in 1952, Khan moved to Bombay.

In Bombay, he won acclaim as a composer of several film scores, including Chetan Anand's Aandhiyan (1952). Lata Mangeshkar sang the title song, "Har Kahin Pe Shaadmani" and as a token of her respect to sarod maestro, did not charge any fee. This was followed by Satyajit Ray's Devi (1960), Merchant-Ivory's The Householder, and Tapan Sinha's Kshudhita Pashan ("Hungry Stones", 1960), for which he won the "Best Musician of the Year" award. He also played sarod for a song in 1955 film Seema which had the music composed by Shankar-Jaikishan. Later in 1993, he would score some of the music for Bernardo Bertolucci's Little Buddha.

Beginning in 1945, Khan also started recording a series of 78 rpm disks (which could record about three minutes of music) at the His Master's Voice studios in Bombay. For one such record he conceived a new composition Raga Chandranandan ("moonstruck"), based on four evening ragas, Malkauns, Chandrakauns, Nandakauns and Kaushi Kanada. This record was a huge success in India, and the raga found a worldwide audience, when a 22-minute rendition was re-recorded for the Master Musician of India LP in 1965 − one of Khan's seminal recordings.

Khan performed in India and traveled extensively in the West. In 1956, Khan founded the Ali Akbar College of Music in Calcutta, with the mission to teach and spread Indian classical music. He founded another school of the same name in Berkeley, California in 1967. The college moved in 1968 to San Rafael, California. Khan performed in Boston with Shankar Ghosh in 1969 for the Peabody Mason Concert series. In 1985 he founded another branch of the Ali Akbar College of Music in Basel, Switzerland. Khan was the first Indian musician to record an LP album of Indian classical music in the United States and to play sarod on American television.

Khan has participated in a number of classic jugalbandi pairings, most notably with Ravi Shankar, Nikhil Banerjee and violinist L. Subramaniam. A few recordings of duets with Vilayat Khan also exist. He also collaborated with Western musicians; he taught Grateful Dead drummers Mickey Hart and, by extension, Bill Kreutzmann. In August 1971, Khan performed at Madison Square Garden for the Concert for Bangladesh, along with Ravi Shankar, Alla Rakha and Kamala Chakravarty; other musicians at the concert included George Harrison, Bob Dylan, Eric Clapton and Ringo Starr. A live album and a movie of the event were later released.

== Personal life ==
Khan was married three times and had at least 11 children, including sarod players Aashish Khan, Alam Khan, and Manik Khan.

Khan was based in the United States for the last four decades of his life. He toured extensively until he was prevented from doing so by ill health. He had been a dialysis patient since 2004. He died from kidney failure at his home in San Anselmo, California on 18 June 2009, at age 87.

== Awards ==
Khan was awarded the Padma Bhushan in 1967 and the Padma Vibhushan in 1989, among other awards. He received a MacArthur Fellowship in 1991, the first Indian musician to receive the so-called "genius grant". In 1997, Khan received the National Endowment for the Arts' prestigious National Heritage Fellowship, the United States' highest honour in the traditional arts. Khan received five Grammy nominations over the course of his life. In September 2014, a postage stamp featuring Khan was released by India Post commemorating his contributions.

== Selected discography ==
Solo albums:

- Sound of the Sarod: Recorded in Concert (World Pacific) (recorded in LA, c1962)
- The Classical Music of India (Prestige, 1964)
- Bear's Sonic Journals: That Which Colors the Mind (Owsley Stanley Foundation, 2020)

With Ravi Shankar:

- The Master Musicians of India (Prestige, 1964)
- Duets (EMI, 1965)

With John Handy:

- Karuna Supreme (MPS, 1976)
- Rainbow (MPS, 1981)

== Cited sources ==
- Lavezzoli, Peter (2006). The dawn of Indian music in the West: Bhairavi. London: Continuum. ISBN 0-8264-1815-5.
