= Taranath Rao =

Background information
- Born: Pandit Taranath Ram Rao Hattiangadi; 1915
- Origin: India
- Died: 1991 (aged 75–76)
- Genres: Indian classical
- Occupations: Musician, teacher
- Instrument: Percussion

Pandit Taranath Ram Rao Hattiangadi (1915 – 1991) was a performer and teacher of Indian classical percussion, known for his knowledge of rare talas and old compositions. He represented the Farukhabad, Delhi, and Ajrada gharanas of tabla, and the Nana Panse tradition of pakhavaj. He studied formally for 47 years—an exceptional amount of time, even in the Indian master-disciple system—under many pandits and ustads, most notably Shamsuddin Khan. He had numerous disciples and students of special training.

== Early life and background ==
Taranath's most significant studentship was under Shamsuddin Khan, gurubhai of Ahmed Jan Thirakwa and main accompanist to Kirana Gharana vocalist Abdul Karim Khan. He also learned from Subbarao Ankolekar, Vishnu Goakar, "Laya Brahma Bhaskar" Khaprumama of Goa, Fayaz Khan of Kanpur, Shankarao Alkutkar, Baburao Ghokle, and Kallu Khan, all noted percussionists.

== Performing career ==
Taranath moved from his native Mangalore to Bombay (now Mumbai) in 1932, and for decades was a scion of that city's music scene—first as a performer and concert organizer, and later, as his health declined, a musical mentor and authority. On All India Radio he gave solo recitals and lecture-demonstrations on topics in North and South Indian classical music, most frequently on advanced, historical or unusual rhythmic structures and compositions. He was involved in scholarly projects such as Nikhil Ghosh's Encyclopedia of Music and Dance in India, and was honored in courtly traditions by the Maharajas of Mysore, Kolhapur, Baroda, and Savantwadi.

Taranath Rao was a close collaborator with influential figures such as Allaudin Khan (whose early Bombay concerts he was instrumental in arranging), Ravi Shankar (for whom he was an original accompanist) and the revolutionary flautist Pannalal Ghosh. His erudition and alliance were sought by members of the Bombay tabla world including Amir Hussain Khan, Pandharinath Nageshkar, Nikhil Ghosh and Nizamuddin Khan, and he was a close confidant of Ahmed Jan Thirakwa. Rao also provided specialty training to a number of already established artists, many of whom were preparing to accompany rhythm-virtuoso Ravi Shankar, among them Chatur Lal.

As a soloist, Rao was known for the architecture and content of his recitals. These normally weaved together sequences of exclusive, archival material with his original compositions. Such pieces were difficult to execute, drawing upon diverse influences in tabla and pakhavaj. Later in his career, Taranath showcased his style and repertoire through his students, arranging interactive public concerts during which he would lead the performers on harmonium and prompt them with spontaneous instructions and recitation of compositions. As teenagers, a number of these disciples earned accolades such as the All India Radio Competition President's Award, and many went on to become master and expert level concert performers.

As an accompanist, Rao performed with nearly all prominent vocal and instrumental raga legends of his time. These include Allaudin Khan, Enayat Khan, Hafiz Ali Khan, Amir Khan, Bade Ghulam Ali Khan, Ravi Shankar, Vilayat Khan, Ali Akbar Khan, Abdul Karim Khan, Hirabai Barodekar, Suresh Babu Mane, Sawai Gandharva, Bhimsen Joshi, the senior Dagar Brothers, Salamat and Nazakat Ali Khan, Kumar Gandharva, Kishanrao Shankar Pandit, Mallikarjun Mansur, Pannalal Ghosh, Devendra Murdeshwar, Aftab-e-Mousiqi Fayyaz Khan, Khadim Hussein Khan, SCR Bhatt, Chidanand Nagarkar, Lakshmi Shankar, Omkarnath Thakur and Rais Khan.

Among this list are not only the most celebrated Indian classical musicians of the twentieth century, but also many of their gurus, and in some cases, their guru’s gurus. Two of Rao's most treasured performances were with Ravi Shankar in the Court of Maharaja of Mysore and with Ali Akbar Khan in the court of Maharaja of Jodhpur in the 1950s.

== Teaching ==
Taranath Rao was a well-known curator of Indian percussion, but he is also remembered for his modern outlook on classical music, innovative approach to drumming, and progressive, systematic teaching style. Along with Jnan Prakash Ghosh of Calcutta, he helped pioneer many contemporary features of solo tabla drumming, such as duo (jugalbandi) performance. The dual-solo format was largely popularized by Rao's disciples Ravi and Shashi Bellare, leading tabla players of the 1950s and 60s, and later by contemporary master Alla Rakha with his son the Zakir Hussain.

In terms of sheer numbers, Rao introduced to about 2,000 students the works and techniques of traditional gharana musicians. In addition to private "tuitions" from his home in Bombay, Taranath taught, lectured and gave examinations at institutions including Ravi Shankar's Kinarra School, Bharatiya Vidya Bhavan, Bhatkande University (Bombay and Lucknow), Maharaja Sayajirao University of Baroda, and the Kala Academy in Goa.

For the last 12 years of his life, Taranath taught at CalArts in Los Angeles, where his younger brother Harihar Rao was heading the Ravi Shankar Music Circle. His disciples around the world, include Yogesh Samsi, Ravi Bellare, Shashi Bellare, Sadanand Naimpalli, Omkar Gulvady, Mohan Balvally, Uday Raikar, Maruti Kurdekar, Vijay Kangutkar, Balakrishna Iyer, Jayawant Bantwal, Anand Badamikar, Jef Feldman, Peter Fagiola, Roland Drogemuller, Gregg Johnson, Bengt Berger, Rupesh Kotecha, Narayan Kadekodi, Vilas Jadhav, Kishore Kulkarni, Vibhav Pathak and Leonice Shinneman. His tradition is carried on by the Peshkar Foundation.
