= Chai with Manju =

- Also known as: Sips of Chai
- Genre: Talk show
- Created by: Dr. Manju Sheth
- Presented by: Dr. Manju Sheth
- Country of origin: United States
- Original language: English
- No. of seasons: 10

Original release
- Release: 2012

Chai with Manju: Every Life Has a Story is a 2012 Indian-American talk show created and hosted by Dr Manju Sheth and produced by Upendra Mishra and Dr Manju Sheth. The show made its debut on 23 October 2012 and has aired ten seasons over a span of ten years.

Chai with Manju featured celebrity guests such as spiritual leaders Sri Sri Ravi Shankar, Sadhguru; Leader Bank, President, Sushil Tuli; philanthropists Desh Deshpande, Sudha Murthy, Jaishree Deshpande; academics Harvard Business School dean Nitin Nohria, Anant Agarwal; former chairman & CEO, Pepsi, Indra Nooyi; and politicians and officials Massachusetts Treasurer Deb Goldberg, Scott Brown, Elizabeth Warren, and Joe Kennedy.

== Background ==
Dr Sheth began her journey in the media industry with a column titled 'Movers and Shakers in Medicine,' which focused on interviewing prominent medical professionals in the Boston area. She is the former president of Indian Medical Association of New England. The success of the series led her to create Chai with Manju. The show was announced on 13 September 2012 and debuted the same year. The show became popular and was compared to other American interview shows from CNN and National Public Radio. It concluded its tenth season in 2022 and expanded to include podcasts. It is created and hosted by Dr. Manju Sheth, a Boston-based doctor at Beth Israel Lahey Health and Atrius Health She is also the CEO and Co-Founder of Women Who Win, a nonprofit media platform. Guests who appeared on the show include Shreya Ghoshal, Sanjeev Kapoor, and politicians such as senator Elizabeth Warren and Joe Kennedy. She has also interviewed spiritual leaders such as Sadhguru, Sri Sri Ravi Shankar, Sister Shivani, as well as academic Sudha Murthy and entrepreneur Desh Deshpande.

== Reviews ==
Sushil Tuli, founder and CEO of Massachusetts-based Leader Bank, praised the work of the Chai with Manju team. He highlighted the importance of the information they share with viewers and readers, especially given today's focus on social, business, and cultural developments in the media.

Renowned knee surgeon Dr. Dinesh Patel, MD, noted that "despite 10 years passing, Chai with Manju remains fresh and highly inspiring."

Brian Pereira, President, CEO and Board Member of Visterra Inc, and a member of the Board at American India Foundation, remarked, "Chai with Manju joins the pantheon of radio/TV programs such as Larry King Live and Fresh Air by Terry Gross."

== Series overview ==
Series	Episodes	Originally released	
Series	Episodes	First released	Last released
1	13	30 January 2017	22 October 2018
2	9	4 February 2019	16 July 2019
3	13	1 May 2020	30 November 2020
4	9	21 February 2021	22 August 2021
5	11	10 April 2022	12 September 2023

== Season 6 (2017-18) ==
No. overall	No. in season	Guests	Original release date
1	1	Mukesh Chatter	30 January 2017
2	2	Kerry Healey	28 February 2017
3	3	Sandeep Das	9 March 2017
4	4	Raj Sisodia	20 March 2017
5	5	Clint Valladares	4 April 2017
6	6	Dr. Shashikala Dwarkanath	24 April 2017
7	7	Sanjeev Kapoor	30 April 2017
8	8	Brahma Kumari Sister Shivani	11 July 2017
9	9	Vandana Tilak	8 March 2018
10	10	Bombay Jayashri	1 April 2018
11	11	S. P. Kothari	16 August 2018
12	12	Nilanjana Bhowmik	17 September 2018
13	13	Subir Sachdev	22 October 2018

== Season 7 (2019) ==
No. overall	No. in season	Guests	Original release date
14	1	Nishant Pandey, Venkat Srinivasan and Raj Sharma	4 February 2019
15	2	Tanushree Dutta	18 February 2019
16	3	Jayantilal Gada	20 February 2019
17	4	Shobhu Yarlagadda	28 February 2019
18	5	Brian J. G. Pereira	12 March 2019
19	6	Sonu Nigam	11 April 2019
20	7	Neha Kakkar	11 April 2019
21	8	Tara Anand	30 April 2019
22	9	Revathy Ramakrishna	16 July 2019

== Season 8 (2020) ==
No. overall	No. in season	Guests	Original release date
23	1	Desh Deshpande and Vadana Tilak	1 May 2020
24	2	Sushil Tuli	4 May 2020
25	3	Raj Sharma	7 July 2020
26	4	Sandeep Das	15 May 2020
27	5	Dr. Pandya, Dr. Sandhu, and Dr. Shivanjappa	19 May 2020
28	6	Kumble R. Subbaswamy	16 June 2021
29	7	Sandeep Chakravorty	1 June 2020
30	8	Monica Bharel	7 June 2020
31	9	Shobha Shastry, Yogi Rana, Dyuti Majumdar, and Pervez Taufiq	10 June 2020
32	10	Anu Chitrapu	29 June 2020
33	11	Joe Kennedy III	8 July 2020
34	12	Reshma Kewalramani	29 October 2020
35	13	Swaroop Sampat	30 November 2020

== Season 9 (2021) ==
No. overall	No. in season	Guests	Original release date
36	1	Sridevi Ajai Thirumalai	21 February 2021
37	2	Neil Sherring	10 February 2021
38	3	Zoya Agarwal	16 April 2021
39	4	Chitra Banerjee Divakaruni	4 May 2021
40	5	Niren Chaudhary	23 May 2021
41	6	Sumbul Siddiqui	16 June 2021
42	7	Masaba Gupta	12 July 2021
43	8	Beth Chandler	31 July 2021
44	9	Dr. George Abraham	22 August 2021

== Season 10 (2022-23) ==
No. overall	No. in season	Guests	Original release date
45	1	Durga Krishnan	10 April 2022
46	2	Rinpoche Shyalpa Tenzin	18 April 2022
47	3	Shahid Parvez	6 May 2022
48	4	Indra Nooyi	2 October 2022
49	5	Niren Chaudhary, Aditi Chaudhary, Nilesh Maniyar	24 January 2023
50	6	Sudha Ragunathan	30 March 2023
51	7	Nayan Ghosh, Ishaan Ghosh	6 April 2023
52	8	Ishaan Ghosh	10 April 2023
53	9	Chitra Banerjee Divakaruni	16 May 2023
54	10	Zakir Hussain	11 August 2023
55	11	Srikant Datar	12 September 2023
