= Ishaan Ghosh =

Indian musician (born 2000)

- Born: 20 May 2000 (age 26)
- Origin: India
- Genres: Hindustani classical music
- Occupations: Musician, Classical player
- Instruments: Tabla
- Years active: 2002–present
- Website: ishaanghosh.com

Ishaan Ghosh is the son and disciple of the Tabla and Sitar maestro Pandit Nayan Ghosh. Ishaan is a Tabla player from the Farrukhabad Gharana.

== Performing career ==
Ishaan was born on 20 May 2000 to Pandit Nayan Ghosh.

He is the grandson of the 20th-century Tabla player Padmabhushan Pandit Nikhil Ghosh and the grand-nephew of the flautist Pandit Pannalal Ghosh.

Ghosh has performed with players of Indian classical music including his father Pandit Nayan Ghosh, Pandit Jasraj, Ustad Amjad Ali Khan, Pandit Buddhadev Das Gupta, Ustad Aashish Khan, Ustad Nishat Khan, Pandit Tejendra Narayan Majumdar, violin legend Dr. N Rajam, Kaushiki Chakraborty, Rahul Deshpande, Rakesh Chaurasia and Purbayan Chatterjee.

He is also a speaker at various youth platforms including TEDx.J

== ARAJ ==
ARAJ is an Indian classical collaboration conceptualized by Ishaan Ghosh and is a group of exceptionally gifted young North Indian classical musicians.

Pandit Nayan Ghosh - Musical Mentor and Sitar

Ishaan Ghosh - Tabla

S. Akash - Flute

Mehtab Ali Niazi - Sitar

Vanraj Shastri - Sarangi

Pratik Singh - Vocals & Tabla

== See also ==
- Pandit Nayan Ghosh
- Pandit Nikhil Ghosh
- Pandit Pannalal Ghosh
- Pandit Jnan Prakash Ghosh
- Ustad Ahmed Jan Thirakwa
- Dhruba Ghosh
