= Mehboob Khan Mirajkar =

Indian tabla player (1868 - 1965)

Ustad Mehboob Khan Mirajkar
- Born: 1868; Pune, Maharashtra, British India
- Died: 1965 (aged 96–97) Pune, Maharastra, India
- Genre: tabla
- Occupations: Musician, Teacher
- Instrument: Tabla

Ustad Mehboob Khan Mirajkar was an Indian tabla player of the Delhi gharana.

== Early life and education ==
Born in Pune in 1868, Mehboob Khan Mirajkar was very fond of playing tabla from his childhood. He left home at a young age to become a disciple of Ustad Jugna Khan. After ten years under his training, Mehboob Khan then met Ustad Jahangir Khan of the Lucknow Baaj of Indore and started studying under him.

Khan also learned many styles of tabla playing from Pandit Balwantrao Watve. After learning from various tabla players of many gharanas and understanding the essence of each gharana in tabla, he developed his own distinct style.

== Career ==
He has accompanied senior artists of Hindustani music like Ustad Abdul Karim Khan, Roshan Ara Begum, Pt. Kumar Gandharva, Pt. Mallikarjun Mansoor, Pt. Sawai Gandharva, Pt. Gajananrao Joshi, and Pt. Jagannath Buva Purohit.

Khan shared his knowledge of tabla generously and without any hesitation. He had a collection of many rare compositions and, due to his nature, taught many disciples and spread tabla across Maharashtra. Among his disciples are artists such as his son Ustad Hanif Khan Mirajkar, Ustad Mamhulal Sangavkar, Pt. Vasantrao Bhendigiri, Pt. Narayanarao Chikkodi, Ustad Abbas Kavthekar, Haji Ustad Babasaheb Mirajkar, Pt. Rajaram Jadhav, Pt. Ramakant Devlekar, Pt. Ganpat Parbatkar, Ustad Shaikh Dawood Khan, Madhukar Ganesh Godbole, and Pt. Jaywantrao Mirajkar. Ustad Shaikh Dawood Khan, in particular, was one of his most acclaimed students who learned many rare compositions of the Farrukhabad gharana.

== Awards and recognition ==
Khan died in Pune in 1965. In his memory, the Pune Municipal Corporation named the road where he lived after him.

The writer and artist P. L. Deshpande also wrote about Khan Mirajkar in his Marathi language book titled “Gun Gayin Avadi”, where he also speaks of many other artists.

== Legacy ==
His legacy is carried on by his sons Abdul Khan Mirajkar, Ustad Hanif Khan Mirajkar, and grandson Shri. Nawaz Mirajkar.

=== Taal Vishwa ===
In the memory of Ustad Mehboob Khan Mirajkar, 'Taal Vishwa', the organization led by Shri. Nawaz Mirajkar presents an award to artists who have created a distinct identity in the field of Tabla and music.

The following tabla maestros have performed for Taal Vishwa and have been conferred the Ustad Mehboob Khan Saheb Mirajkar Award: Ustad Nizamuddin Khan Saheb, Pandit Shashi Bellare, Pandit Nayan Ghosh, Pandit Kumar Bose, Pandit Swapan Chaudhuri, Ustad Shabbir Nisar, Ustad Raffiudin Sabri, Ustad Rashid Mustafa Thirakwa, Pandit Yogesh Samsi, Pandit Suresh Talwalkar, Pandit Ravindra Yavagal.
