= Farrukhabad gharana =

Indian classical music style

Farrukhabad Gharana is one of the six prominent playing styles, or gharanas, of North Indian tabla in Hindustani classical music, deriving its name from Farrukhabad in Uttar Pradesh.

== History ==
The Farrukhabad Gharana of tabla music was created in the 11th century by a Rajput court musician, Akaasa, who later had to convert to Islam (Dastaan-e-akasa). He also changed his name from Akaasa to Mir Akaasa. He was the first to introduce bols into tabla playing. The first bols introduced for the tabla were tat-dhit-thun-nan. Akaasa died in the year 1189 AD, and was succeeded by nine sons and one daughter. He passed on his legacy to his eldest son, Ustad Bilawal Khan, who in turn passed the torch of the gharana to Ustad Ali Baksh, known for his kran bols. This tradition continued through to the 26th descendant, Ustad Haji Vilayat Ali Khan (1779–1826), who named the gharana after the province in which he used to live, Farrukhabad.

Vilayat Ali Khan got the title of Haji after completing seven hajj pilgrimages. Khan became famous after a competition of tabla gats (compositions) with Ustad Salaali Khansaheb, who had challenged Ustad Bakshu Khansaheb of Lucknow gharana. To save his pride, Bakshu requested Khan, who was also Salaali's uncle, to compete in place of Bakshu. The competition lasted for almost 15 days, in which many gats and jodas (pairs of gats) were exchanged. On the 15th day, Khan played a unique gat (the "Gat of Gazi") whose joda Salaali could not produce. Thus Khan was declared the winner. As a reward, Bakshu had his daughter marry Khan and reputedly gave him 500 tabla compositions (although some sources say only 12). Khan on the other hand gave Salaali his daughter in marriage, as well as 14 gats, known as jahezi gats.

The lineage of Farrukhabad is still carried on by the descendants of the gharana, and the 33rd and current khalifa (head) of the gharana is Ustad Sabir Khan.

There is a huge variety in the repertoire of compositions, owing to the large and creative output of composers such as Vilayat Ali Khan and Amir Hussain Khan, nephew of Munir Khan, himself a disciple of Nisar Hussain Khan. In addition, a large number of gats (compositions).

== Repertoire ==
The Farrukhabad gharana is among the oldest gharanas (i.e. schools) of tabla, the oldest being the Delhi gharana. It belongs to the wider purbi baj, or 'eastern way of playing', which groups the Lucknow, Farrukhabad and Benares styles together. It is characterized by an extensive use of resonant strokes played on the sur of the daya, reminiscent of the pakhawaj, and also, in the case of Farrukhabad, by delicate strokes.

The repertoire is replete with varied compositions, makes use of open resonant baya strokes, and contains many unique stroke combinations. There is a greater emphasis on gats, chalan, and rela compositions than on kayda or peshkar. There is a prominent use of certain bols, notably dhere-dhere / kita-taka / takita-dha.

== Members ==
=== 19th century ===
- Vilayat Ali Khan (1779–1826), co-founder of the gharana. Son-in-law and disciple of Miyan Bakshu Khan of the Lucknow gharana.
- Hussein Ali Khan, son and disciple of Vilayat Ali Khan.
- Choodiyanwale Imam Baksh, disciple of Vilayat and noted pakhawaj player.
- Nesar Hussain Khan (1824–1877), son and disciple of Vilayat.
- Salari Khan, disciple of Vilayat.
- Mubarak Ali Khan, disciple of Vilayat.
- Channu Khan, disciple of Vilayat.
- Karam Ittal Khan, disciple of Vilayat and brother of Ilaahi Baksh.
- Ilaahi Baksh, disciple of Vilayat and brother of Karam Ittal Khan.
- Nanhe Khan (1847–1902), son and disciple of Nesar Hussain Khan.
- Munir Khan (1863–1937), disciple of Hussein Ali Khan, and also learned from his father, Kaale Khan. Founded the Laliana gharana sub-branch.
- Masidullah "Masit" Khan (1872–1974), son and disciple of Nanhe Khan.
- Faiyaz Khan Moradabadi, son and disciple of Karam Ittal Khan, and maternal uncle of Ahmed Jan Thirakwa.

=== 20th century ===
- Ahmed Jan Thirakwa (1892–1976), disciple of paternal uncle Sher Khan of the Lucknow gharana, maternal uncle Moradabadi, and Munir Khan.
- Shamsuddin Khan (1890–1968), disciple of Moradabadi, Munir Khan, and Tega Jaffer Khan of the Delhi gharana.
- Amir Hussain Khan (1899–1969), disciple of maternal uncle Munir Khan.
- Azeem Baksh Khan, disciple of Nanhe Khan and Masit Khan.
- Subraimama Ankolekar, disciple of Munir Khan.
- Raichand Boral (1903–1981), disciple of Masit Khan. Best known as a film score composer.
- Jagannathbuwa Purohit (1904–1968), disciple of Thirakwa. Primarily known as a vocalist of the Agra gharana.
- Jnan Prakash Ghosh (1909–1997), disciple of Masit Khan, also learned from Firoz Khan of the Punjab gharana.
- Vinayakrao Ghangrekar, disciple of Ankolekar.
- Pandharinath Nageshkar (1913–2008), disciple of Ankolekar, Amir Hussain Khan, and Thirakwa.
- Montu Bannerjee (1915–1980s), disciple of Jnan Prakash Ghosh and Masit Khan. Also learned from Abid Hussain Khan of the Lucknow gharana, and Natthu Khan. Primarily a harmonium player.
- Taranath Rao (1915–1991), disciple of Shamsuddin Khan, also learned from Khaprumama Parvatkar.
- Karamatullah Khan (1917–1977), son and disciple of Masit Khan.
- Nikhil Ghosh (1918–1995), disciple of Jnan Prakash Ghosh, Amir Hussain Khan, and Thirakwa.
- Lalji Gokhale (1919–2002), disciple of Thirakwa. Also learned from Malan Khan and Fakir Khan of the Punjab gharana and Habibuddin Khan of the Delhi gharana.
- Kanai Dutta (1925–1977), disciple of Jnan Prakash Ghosh. Also learned from Satish Das.
- Nizamuddin Khan (1927–2000), son and disciple of Azeem Baksh Khan.
- Ravi Bellare (1927–2005), disciple of maternal uncle Taranath Rao.
- Bhai Gaitonde (1932–2019), disciple of Purohit, Thirakwa, and Ghangrekar.
- Pt. Sudhakar Paithankar (b. 1937), disciple of Pt. Narayanbuva Joshi.
- Arvind Mulgaonkar (1937–2018), disciple of Amir Hussain Khan.
- Babasaheb Mirajkar, disciple of Amir Hussain Khan.
- Shyamal Bose (1934–2003), disciple of Jnan Prakash Ghosh. Also learned from Lakshmi Prasad Mishra of the Benares gharana, Firoz Khan of the Punjab gharana, and Anath Nath Bose.
- Shankar Ghosh (1935–2016), disciple of Jnan Prakash Ghosh. Also learned from Firoz Khan, Anath Nath Bose, and Sudarshan Adhikari.
- Suresh Talwalkar (b. 1948), disciple of Ghangrekar and Pandharinath Nageshkar.
- Sanjay Mukherjee.
- Swapan Siva (b. 1951), disciple of Karamatullah Khan.
- Anindo Chatterjee (b. 1954), disciple of Jnan Prakash Ghosh.
- Vibhav Nageshkar (b. 1955), son and disciple of Pandharinath Nageshkar.
- Nayan Ghosh (b. 1956), son and disciple of Nikhil Ghosh.
- Sabir Khan (b. 1959), son and disciple of Karamatullah Khan, and present khalifa of the gharana.
- Somnath Mukherjee (1962–2020), disciple of Pt. Shyamal Bose and Pt. Anath Nath Bose. Also learned from his father, Vivekananda Mukherjee.
- Abhijit Banerjee (b. 1964), disciple of Jnan Prakash Ghosh. Also learned from Tushar Kanti Bose and Manik Pal.
- Bickram Ghosh (b. 1966), son and disciple of Pt. Shankar Ghosh.
- Tanmoy Bose (b. 1963), disciple of Shankar Ghosh and Kanai Dutta. He also learned vocals from Pt. Maharaj Banerjee and harmonium from Pt. Mantu Bannerjee.
- Parimal Chakraborty (b. 1964), disciple of Sankar Ghosh and Pt. Gayan Prakash Ghosh.
- Subhankar Banerjee (1966–2021), disciple of Swapan Siva.
- Vishwanath Shirodkar (b. 1960s), disciple of Suresh Talwalkar, Vibhav Nageshkar, and Nayan Ghosh.
- Biswajit Deb (b. 1959), disciple of Prabir Bhatacharya of the Farrukhabad gharana.
- Biswajit Bose (b.1950s), disciple of Shankar Ghosh and Karamatullah Khan of the Farrukhabad gharana.

=== 21st century ===
- Satyajit Talwalkar (b. 1970s), son and disciple of Suresh Talwalkar.
- Savani Talwalkar (b. 1980s), daughter and disciple of Suresh Talwalkar.
- Anubrata Chatterjee (b. 1985), son and disciple of Anindo Chatterjee.
- Rimpa Siva (b. 1986), daughter and disciple of Swapan Siva.
- Ariff Khan (b. 1988), son and disciple of Sabir Khan (present khalifa).
- Asif Khan (b. 1990), son and disciple of Sabir Khan.
- Ameen Khan (b. 1992), son and disciple of Sabir Khan.
- Ishaan Ghosh (b. 2000), son and disciple of Nayan Ghosh.
- Dr. Partha Priya Das (b. 1970), disciple of Pt. Shankar Ghosh, and disciple of Pt. Debasish Bhattacharjee in Hindustani slide guitar.
