= Bhai Gaitonde =

Indian tabla player (1932–2019)

Pandit Bhai Gaitonde
- Born: Suresh Gaitonde; 6 May 1932; Kankavli, Bombay Presidency, British India
- Died: 27 June 2019 (aged 87) Thane, Maharashtra, India
- Genres: Hindustani classical music
- Occupation: Musician
- Instrument: Tabla
- Years active: 1950s–2019
- Website: panditbhaigaitonde.com

Pandit Suresh "Bhai" Gaitonde (6 May 1932 – 27 June 2019) was an Indian tabla player. He is best known for being a major disciple of Ahmed Jan Thirakwa and leading representative of the Farukhabad tradition. He was the leading exponent of Thirakwa Shailey (baaj). Sangeet Natak Academy has stored his recording in the archives as the successor of Ustad Thirakwa.

== Background ==
Born in Kankavli to a Gaud Saraswat Brahmin family. He later relocated with his family to Kolhapur. Gaitonde earned a diploma in electrical engineering from St. Xavier's College, Mumbai in the 1950s.

=== Musical Training ===
Pt. Gaitonde started learning tabla from his father, a doctor by profession. At Kolhapur, he studied with Sudhakar Digrajkar, Ramakant Bedagkar, Mhamulal Sangawkar, and Balubhaiya Rukadikar, who acquainted his father's medical practice.

He learnt the intricacies of Tabla under 9 different Gurus during his entire lifetime. A detailed list and what he learnt from them is available on his website give below. From 1952 to 1968, Gaitonde studied tabla with Jagannathbuwa Purohit, a noted vocalist of the Agra gharana who had studied tabla with Ahmed Jan Thirakwa. Following Purohit's death, he became a ganda-bandh disciple of Ahmed Jan Thirakwa, studying with the maestro for three years. After Thirakwa's death, Gaitonde learned from Vinayakrao Ghangrekar, a disciple of Subraimama Ankolekar. He continued studying with his gurubhai, Pt. Lalji Gokhale, until the latter's death in 2002. Noteworthy is the fact that Bhaiji was 60+ when he was learning with Pt. Lalji Gokhale. He truly believed in learning as a lifelong process and practiced it.

== Legacy ==
Pt. Gaitonde is remembered for contributing to the status of tabla as a solo instrument. He is also remembered as an accompanist to musicians like Kumar Gandharva, Sharadchandra Arolkar, Bhimsen Joshi, Ram Marathe, Yeshwantbuwa Joshi, Ratnakar Pai, Rajabhau Kogje, Ram Narayan, Gajanan Buwa Joshi, and Jagannathbuwa Purohit, among others.

=== Students ===
Pt. Gaitonde taught selflessly and passionately without charging any money. His students are spread over in India as well as other countries including US, UK, Germany etc.

Some of his disciples include: Ganda Bandh: Mahesh Kanole, Ajit Pendse, Raghvendra Kulkarni Prominent disciples: Pt. Sudhir Sansare, Sunil Jayphalkar, Rashmin Bhagwat, Shubhada Kurve, Abhay Datar, Gajanan Naik, Shreepad Parkhe, Sanjeevani Hasabnis, Pandurang Dehadraya, Kishore Bandhwalkar among others.

Besides this, he was also associated with ABGMV and various other universities. He has guided numerous students from Graduate (Visharad) to PhD levels. Several leading artists of the day have sought his inputs and guidance.

== Awards and accolades ==
He received over 40 awards. A detailed list with photos is available on his website. Some of the noteworthy awards were:

- Sangeet Natak Akademi Award - Government of India
- Maharashtra Rajya Sanskrutic Puraskar 2011-12 – Government of Maharashtra
- Guru Samman Arpan – Bhatkhande Music Institute Deemed University
- Bangiya Sanskrutik Sangh Puraskar
- Nadashree – Hindusthani Sangeet Kalakar Mandali, Bangalore
- Taal Ratna Puraskar – Taal Chakra, Pune
- Chaturang Pratishthan Puraskar – Mhaiskar Foundation
- Taal Vilas – Sangeet Peeth Sur Singar Samsad, Mumbai
- Swar Sadhana Ratna – Swar Sadhana Samiti, Mumbai
- Konkan Kala Bhushan, Mumbai
- Maanad Sangeetacharya – Akhil Bharatiya Gandharva Mahavidyalaya Mandal, Mumbai
- Pt. Ram Marathe Smruti Puraskar – Thane Mahanagarpalika
- Vocational excellence Award – Rotary Club, Thane
- Certificate of Honor – Lions Club of Thane
- Taal Rishi Puraskaar – Sangwi, Pune
- Kalashree Puraskar – Kalashree Sangeet Mandal, Pune
- Sangeet Bhushan Pt. Ram Marathe Smruti Puaskar – Bharat Gayan Samaj, Pune
- Marathi Gaurav Puraskar – Mumbai
- Mridangacharya Shankarbhaiya Puraskar

== See also ==
- Alla Rakha
- Zakir Hussain
- Ahmed Jan Thirakwa
- Nikhil Ghosh
