= Punjab gharana =

Traditional technique for playing the musical instrument tabla

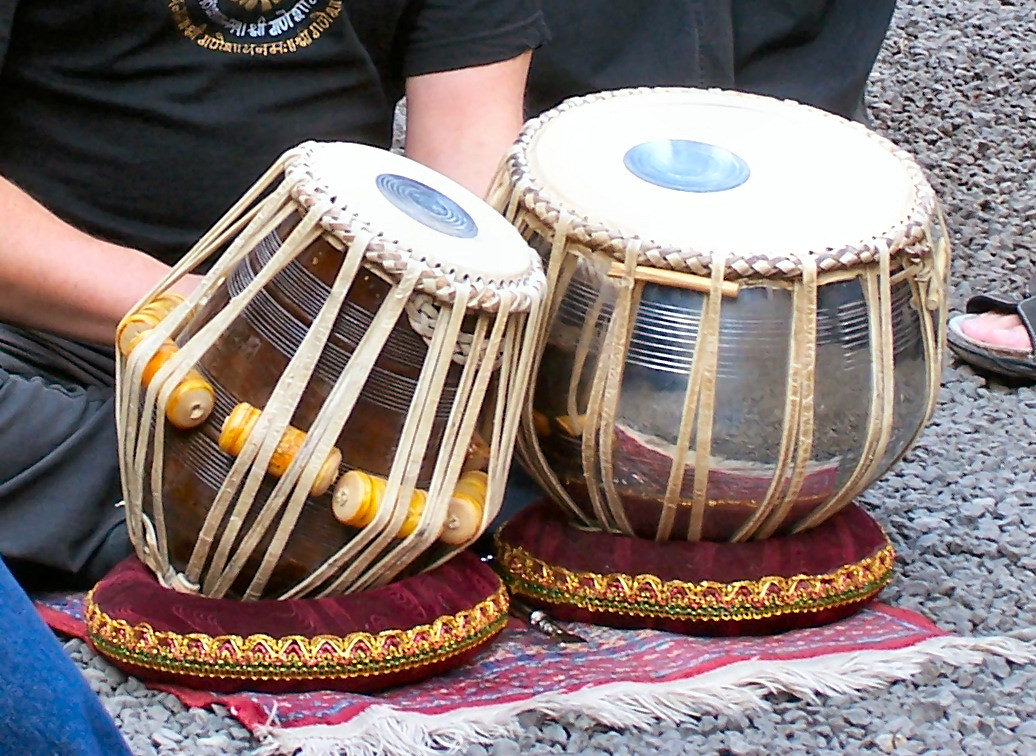
Tabla

Paṅjāb Gharānā (Urdu:پنجاب گھرانا) (Hindi: पंजाब घराना) (Punjabi: ਪੰਜਾਬ ਘਰਾਨਾ), sometimes called Punjabi or Paṅjābī Gharānā, is a style and technique of tabla playing that originated in the Punjab region of the Indian subcontinent, now split between present-day Pakistan and India.

The Punjab Gharana is considered one of the six main styles of tabla, the others being Delhi, Ajrada, Banares, Lucknow, and Farrukhabad. The repertoire of the Punjab Gharana is heavily influenced by the Pakhawaj.

== Lineage ==
Lala Bhavanidas (Founder)
Miyan Qadir Baksh, I
Sajjad Hussain Baksh
Miyan Faqir Baksh
Miyan Qadir Baksh, II	Ustad Firoz Khan
Ustad Alla Rakha	{{{Ustad Lachhman Singh Seen}}}	Ustad Shaukat Hussain	Pandit Jnan Prakash Ghosh
Utd. Altaf Hussain "Tafo" Khan	Ustad Akhtar Hussain Khan
Ustad Zakir Hussain	Ustad Fazal Qureshi	Ustad Taufiq Qureshi	Pandit Shyam Kane	Ustad Abdul Sattar "Tari" Khan	Ustad Mohammed; Ajmal Khan	Pandit Nikhil Ghosh	Pandit Shankar Ghosh
Ustad Ghulam Abbas Khan	Pandit Yogesh Samsi	Sajjad Ali	Ustad Ejaz Hussain "Ballu" Khan
Pandit Nayan Ghosh
Aditya Kalyanpur	Prafulla Athalye	Amit Kavthekar

== Tabla masters ==
=== Alla Rakha (1919–2000) ===
Teacher: Mian Qadir Bakhsh II
Alla Rakha Khan (born Allah Rakha Qureshi) was one of the most famous and widely recorded tabla players of the twentieth century. For tabla, Ustad Alla Rakha was such an artist, having brought his instrument a stature and respect never before enjoyed. He moved from Lahore to Bombay in the late 1940s and took full advantage of the opportunity to be in the public eye when Ravi Shankar retained him as his regular touring accompanist from around 1962 onwards. What he lacked in beauty of tone, Alla Rakha more than made up for it, with the most magically intuitive and natural sense of rhythm – an ability to play outside the beat while always remaining entirely cognizant of it. Rakha popularized the art of tabla, playing across the globe, elevating the status and respect of his instrument. Abbaji (as he was affectionately known by his disciples) also bridged the gap between Carnatic music and Hindustani music by playing with both renowned Carnatic musicians and otheanr Hindusti stalwarts.

Leading American percussionists in rock ’n’ roll, including the Grateful Dead’s Mickey Hart, admired Alla Rakha and studied his technique, often finding even a single meeting highly instructive. Hart, who is himself a published authority on percussion in world music, called Rakha “the Einstein, the Picasso; he is the highest form of rhythmic development on this planet.” Rakha also collaborated with jazz drummer Buddy Rich, recording an album together in 1968. In 1985, he founded the Ustad Alla Rakha Institute of Music to train young tabla players in the tradition of the Punjab gharana. Ustad Alla Rakha died on 3 February 2000, and he is widely regarded as one of the most pivotal and influential artists to have emerged from modern India.

=== Mian Shaukat Hussain (1930 – 1996) ===
Teachers: Pandit Hiralal & Mian Qadir Bukhsh
Characterized by the most distinct sur/tone recorded so far, Miyan Shaukat Hussain Khan is ranked amongst the finest musicians of South Asia. He is the last tabla player of Punjab gharana to be bestowed the title of "Miyan" (meaning the one with knowledge) which is the highest ranking title in north Indian classical music. Thus he is considered as the greatest tabla player of Punjab gharana after his teacher Mian Qadir Bakhsh.

Shaukat Hussain gained solo fame through his self composed qaidas. He was a master of the subject of "tete-dhete" and his qaidas on the subject are considered the best of their kind across all the gharanas of tabla. His challan (style) of three-finger tere-kete also gained him critical fame among the musically educated audience.

Apart from the solo repertoire, the maestro was also known for his accompaniment. Shaukat Hussain Khan was the accompanist of choice for Pakistani vocalists including Amanat Ali Khan - Fateh Ali Khan, Salamat Ali Khan - Nazakat Ali Khan, Roshan Ara Begum. He developed a unique style of accompanying called "barjasta (spontaneous) ang", which can particularly be heard in his performances with Salamat Ali Khan.

As a soloist, one hears the Delhi roots of his sound mixed with a Punjabi sense of rhythmic complexity. One can hear a complexity in the varied internal phrase lengths of pieces and in the taal structures. Shaukat Hussain was famous for his high level of melodic variation and modulation of his bayan (the left hand bass drum) and kept his bayan in rather lower pitch register, which allowed him to work more extensively with his wrist, thus embellishing his tabla.

Now after the death of Mian Shaukat Hussain Khan, his son, Ustad Raza Shaukat became a Khalifa continuing the tradition of the Punjab gharana in Pakistan.

=== Ustad Lacchman Singh Seen (1927–2022) ===
Ustad Lachhman Singh Seen was a musician and scholar from Punjab, India. He was born on December 3rd, 1927 in Punjab and was encouraged to play music by his father Thakur Mangat Singh and his mother Shrimati Ishwari Devi. Although his parents were not classical musicians themselves they had a deep affection for music and very much encouraged their son so that he could devote himself, mind and body to music. This was in the days when music was not considered a respectable profession in India and his family had even received threats to be excommunicated from the community. In spite of this, he attended the Durga Music Academy in Jammu.

=== Altaf Hussain or Ustad Tafu (1945–2024) ===
Teachers: Mian Qadir Bukhsh & Haji Fida Hussain
Ustad Tafu is recognised for his "tayyari". His solo performances are characterised by his prowess over difficult "bols" and stage presence. Ustad Tafu has been and still continues to be a major film music director in Pakistan and has composed music for over 700 films over a period of 35 years for the Pakistani film industry.

=== Abdul Sattar or Tari Khan (born 1953) ===
Teacher: Mian Shaukat Hussain Khan

Hailing from a traditional Rababi family (musicians employed in the Sikh temples of Punjab), Tari Khan learned under Shaukat Hussain Khan in Lahore and became famous as the accompanist of the ghazal singer Ghulam Ali (his "Chupke Chupke" ghazal was a major hit back in the early 1980s). Tari is known for providing crisp "thekas" with quick "laggis" to punctuate the verses. Because of that international exposure, musicians in India got to hear of him at a time when little cultural news escaped from Pakistan. Since then, Tari has gone on to international fame as a tabla showman. His "International Kherwa" was a popular item (a musical journey round the world that incorporated other musical styles into the basic four-beat pattern).

=== Zakir Hussain (1951-2024) ===
Teacher/Father: Ustad Alla Rakha
Zakir Hussain is widely regarded as one of the greatest tabla players of his generation. The son of Allarakha Khan, he has composed, performed, and recorded for a great many projects across his career, having earned four Grammy Awards out of nine nominations. Hussain moved to and was based out of San Francisco in the late 1960's leading up to his death, but by the 1970's was touring prolifically, often playing over 150 dates a year. He was a core member of Shakti (band), and toured with other notable artists such as Earth, Wind & Fire, Mahavishnu, and Kitarō. He died 15 December 2025 from complications with idiopathic pulmonary fibrosis in San Francisco.

=== Yogesh Samsi (born 1968) ===
Pandit Yogesh Samsi born in Mumbai to renowned vocalist Pandit Dinkar Kaikini.[3] His father the eminent vocalist Dinkar Kaikini initiated Yogesh at the age of six.[4] At the age of four he started learning the tabla from Pandit H. Taranth Rao. Later, he sought the guidance of Ustad Allarakha Khan, one of the greatest percussionists. He spent 23 years under the tutelage of Allarakha.

Yogesh Samsi has accompanied the top grade instrumentalists and vocalists and dancers of India, including Ustad Vilayat Khan, Pt. Ajoy Chakroborty, Pt Dinkar Kaikini, Pandit Bhimsen Joshi, Pt Shivkumar Sharma, Pt Hariprasad Chaurasia, Ken Zuckerman and Pt Birju Maharaj. He strives to keep up his revered Guru's word of preserving the tradition in the presentation of tabla solo. He also appeared in the first episode of Idea Jalsa with Shivkumar Sharma & Takahiro Arai.
