= Tari Khan =

Pakistani tabla player

Ustad Tari Khan
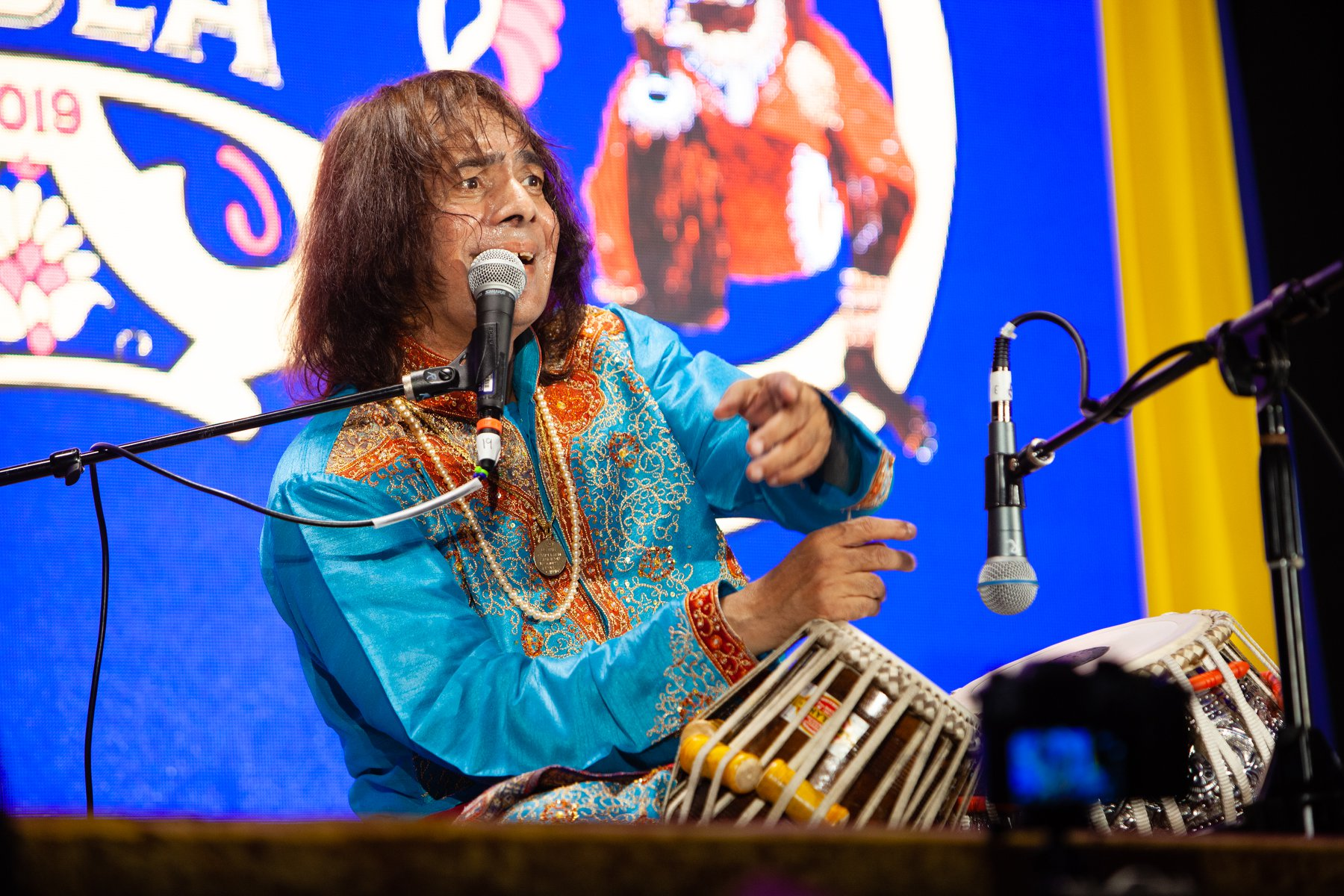

Background information
- Also known as: 'Tari' Khan
- Born: Abdul Sattar Khan; 1953 (age 72–73); Lahore, Pakistan
- Genres: Hindustani classical music, World music
- Occupations: Tabla Maestro & Vocalist
- Instrument: Tabla
- Years active: 1967–present
- Website: Official website - Archived

Tari Khan
- Awards: Pride of Performance Award by the President of Pakistan in 2008

Abdul Sattar Khan, popularly known as Ustad Tari Khan and Abdul Sattar Tari, is a Pakistani tabla player and vocalist.

Tari Khan belongs to the tabla playing gharana called the Punjab gharana and is a student of Miyan Shaukat Hussain.

== Awards and recognition ==
- Taj Poshi (Golden Crown) Award
- Pride of Performance Award by the President of Pakistan in 2008.
- Amir Khusrau Award

== Early life ==
Tari Khan was born in Lahore, Pakistan. He hails from a traditional Rababi family (Muslim musicians employed in the royal Darbar Sahib, chief Sikh temple in Amritsar). His father was a classical vocalist. At the age of six, Tari was so captivated by the Tabla playing of Ustad Miyan Shaukat Hussain Khan, that for the next eight years, Tari Khan heard Ustad Mian Shaukat Hussain Khan's tabla at various events. At fourteen, he formally became a student of Ustad Miyan Shaukat Hussain Khan, thus beginning his journey into Tabla. Three years later, he would go on to perform at the death anniversary of tabla master Miyan Qadir Baksh for over 2 hours.

== Career ==
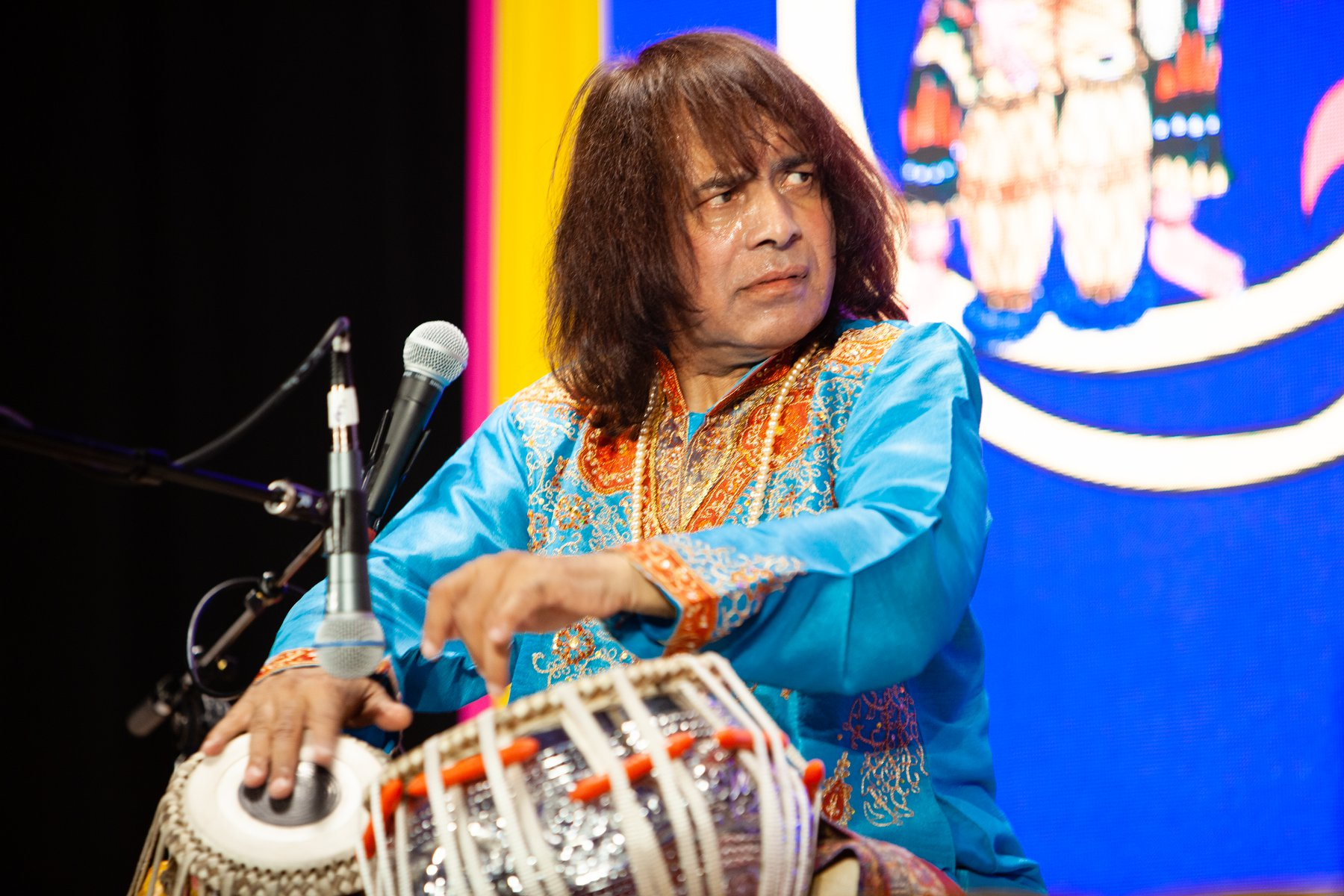
Ustad Tari playing at the Festival of Tabla in 2019.

Ustad Tari became famous as the accompanist of the ghazal singer Mehdi Hassan, as well as Ghulam Ali. Tari Khan is known for providing crisp thekas with quick laggis to punctuate the verses. Because of this international exposure, musicians in India got to hear of him at a time when little cultural news escaped from Pakistan. Recently, Tari has been a tabla showman.

Tari Khan has accompanied various classical artists like Pandit Jasraj, Ustad Nusrat Fateh Ali Khan, Ustad Rahat Fateh Ali Khan, Roshan Ara Begum, Ustad Bade Fateh Ali Khan, Ustad Salamat Ali Khan, Ustad Ghulam Hassan Shaggan, Ustad Shafqat Ali Khan, Ustad Rais Khan (sitar player), Ustad Sharif Khan Poonchwaley (sitar player), Ustad Vilayat Khan (sitar player), and Pandit Ramesh Mishra, to name a few. He has also accompanied renowned singers like Ustad Mehdi Hassan, Ghulam Ali, Jagjit Singh, Talat Aziz, Hariharan, Parvez Mehdi, Shankar Mahadevan, and Hans Raj Hans, to name a few.

"His fingers produce an amazing resonance on tabla," says Hans Raj Hans, a famous Punjabi Sufi music singer.

Some of his famous tabla pieces include "The Train", where he is able to mimic the sounds of a train on the tabla, and "International Keherwa", which features varying styles of the world in an 8 beat cycle.

=== Harballabh Sangeet Sammelan ===
Tari Khan has performed at the oldest ongoing Hindustani classical music festival, Harballabh Sangeet Sammelan, at the 130th and 132nd festivals. Ustad Tari played a Teentaal (16 beat cycle) solo, his famous piece "International Keherwa" (8 beat cycle), and also had a vocal performance during the 130th Harballabh Sangeet Sammelan. Anuradha Shukla, of The Tribune India, noted that Ustad Tari Khan, "...gave music enthusiasts a treat both rare and divine." For his performance at the 132nd festival, The Tribune India noted that Ustad Tari's performance was "the limelight of the evening."

=== Festival of Tabla ===
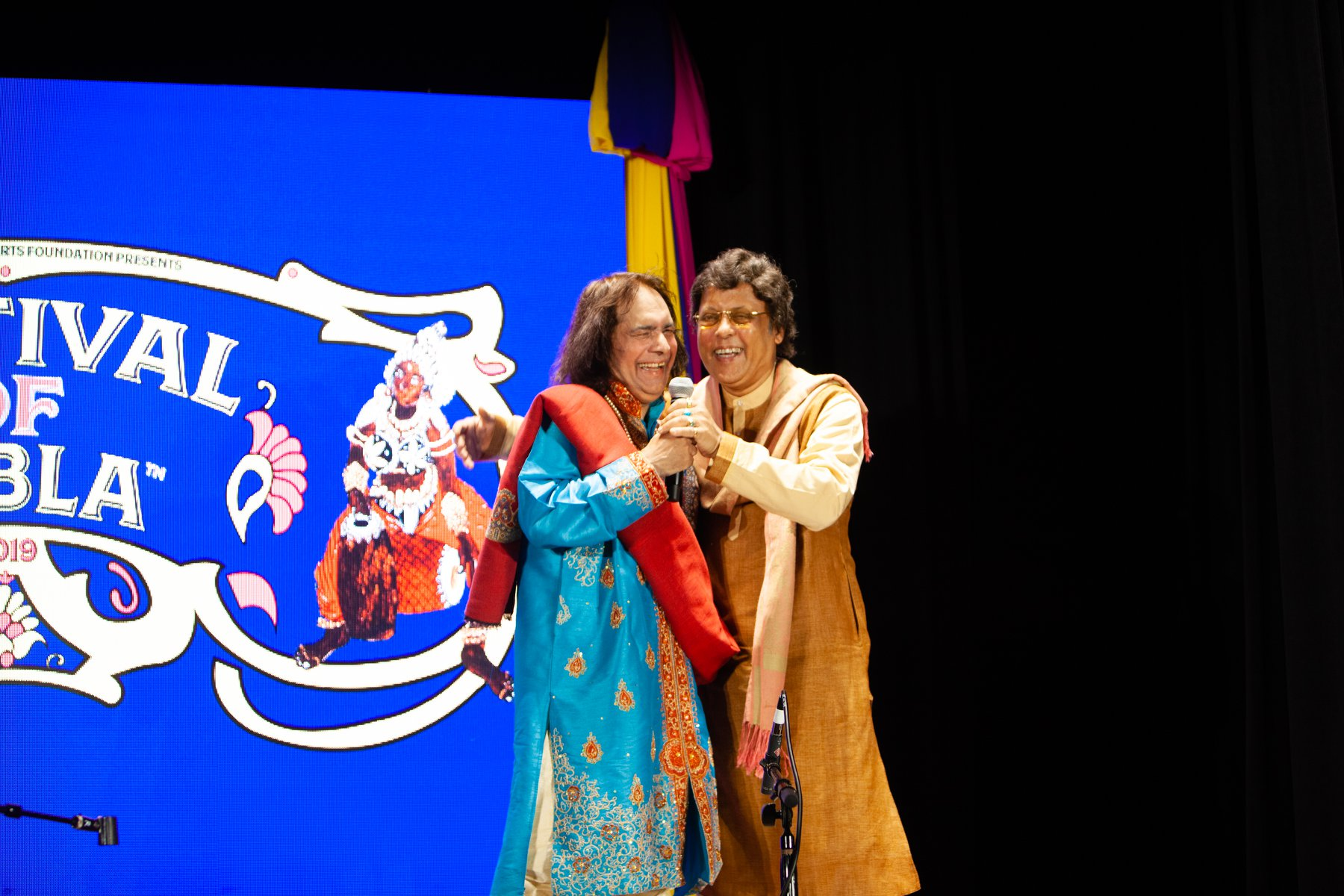
Ustad Tari Khan and Pandit Anindo Chatterjee share the stage at Festival of Tabla in 2019.

The Ravi & Shashi Bellare Arts Foundation is an organization, founded by Rupesh and Mona Kotecha, that preserves and presents the arts and culture of South Asia with a focus on Tabla and Indian classical music. The organization presented their annual Festival of Tabla in 2019, which showcased tabla solos, santoor and sarangi accompaniments, and other classical performances by various artists from all over the globe. The two-day festival featured Ustad Tari Khan and Pandit Anindo Chatterjee as headlining performances, along with performances from esteemed artists, such as Pandit Anand Badamikar, Pankaj Mishra (sarangi player), and Aditya Kalyanpur, among others. For his performance, Ustad Tari presented Teentaal (16 beat cycle) solo, with accompaniment on the santoor by Kamaljeet Ahluwalia, and his famous piece "International Keherwa."

After Ustad Tari's teentaal performance, Pandit Anindo Chatterjee went on stage, as a sign of respect and appreciation, and shared his thoughts about Ustad Tari. Pandit Anindo Chatterjee had this to say after Ustad Tari's performance:

"Once in a thousand years it comes, this kind of [artist]. The [discipline] and dedication that he has had in his life for tabla, we know that it is so fantastic, so melodious, and musical, and rhythmic. Today, he took so much intricate, intricate tihai and rhythmic pattern that [it was] unbelievable. I really pray to God that Tari bhai should live many, many years and we can listen [to] him. Please bless and love him."

=== Vocal singing career ===
Ustad Tari has also shown his talent in singing. He is a disciple of Ustad Mehdi Hassan and learned singing from him.

== Discography ==
- Mehdi Hassan - Meri Pasand, Vol 1 (1983)
- Blue Moods: Ghazal and Hindi Collection (2000) - Ehsan Aman
- Samvad (Conversation) with Ustad Tari Khan (2005) - Deepak Ram
- Sangam (2006) - Alif Laila
- An Unforgettable Evening with Ustad Tari Khan (2008)

== Personal life ==
Tari Khan lives in California, US. He trains his disciples in Tabla playing in California as well. He has a number of followers around the world and has several students across the globe.

"Expanding his horizons, he moved to California 16 years ago, founded an academy for tabla studies there, and started touring universities and conservatories throughout America and Europe. At the same time, he's been absorbing the creative influences of other musics: jazz, African, rock, etc."
