= Shaukat Hussain =

Pakistani musician (1930-1996)

Ustad and Miyan Shaukat Hussain Khan
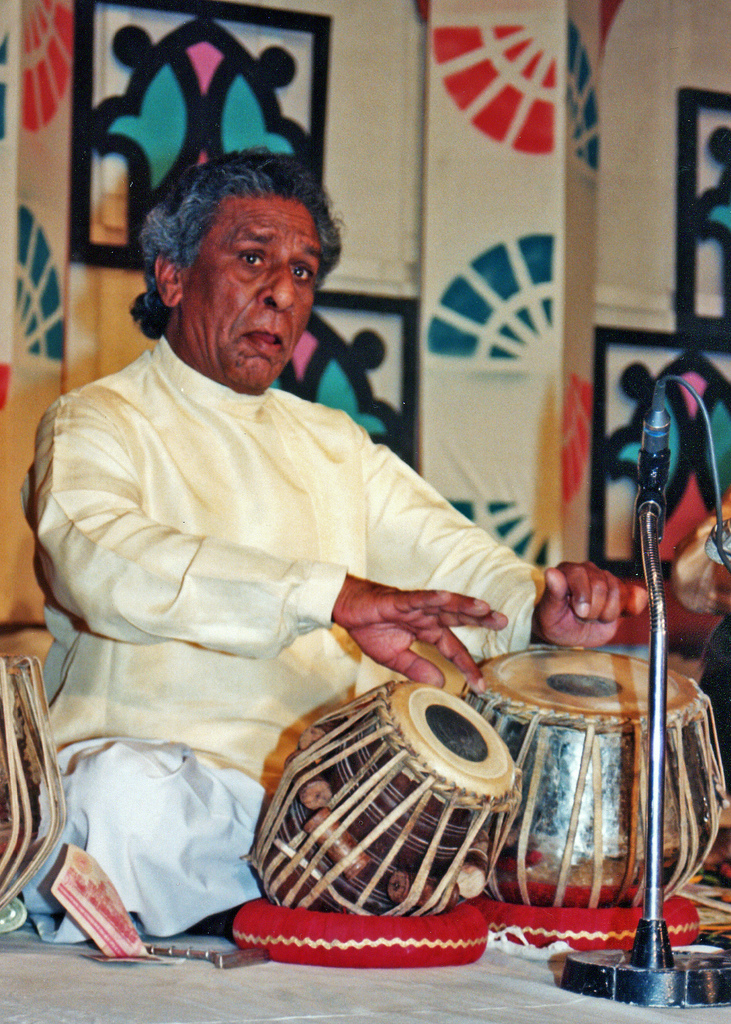
- Performing at Alhamra Arts Council, Lahore, Pakistan
- Born: Shaukat Hussain Khan; 1930; Phagwara, Jalandhar, Punjab, British India
- Died: 25 January 1996 at age 66
- Occupation: Tabla maestro
- Years active: 1945 – 1992
- Awards: Pride of Performance by the President of Pakistan (1985)

Shaukat Hussain Khan (1930 – 25 January 1996), commonly referred to as Miyan Shaukat Hussain, was a Pakistani tabla player who belonged to the Punjab gharana of tabla-playing music artists.

== Early life ==
He was born to a family of professional musicians in 1930 in Phagwara, Jalandhar, Punjab, British India. His father, Mian Maula Bakhsh, was a professional singer. But young Shaukat was drawn to percussion instruments from an early age. He began his career from All India Radio, Delhi in 1945. At this radio station, he was very much influenced by the performances of tabla maestros Ahmed Jan Thirakwa and Alla Rakha. His family migrated to Pakistan after its independence in 1947. In Pakistan, he was employed by Radio Pakistan, Lahore as a staff artist for 43 years.

== Career ==
He was a disciple of renowned tabla maestro Mian Qadir Baksh, founder of the Punjab gharana of tabla players who also was the teacher of many tabla players that later gained international recognition.

Mian Qadir Baksh was known throughout the world for his skill and mastery of tabla. After learning the art of tabla playing from Mian Qadir Baksh, Shaukat Hussain soon started gaining recognition in the music circles in Pakistan and was the music group accompanist of choice for some of Pakistan's classical music vocalists and instrumentalists including Salamat Ali Khan, Amanat Ali Khan-Bade Fateh Ali Khan (classical-music-singing-duo), Roshan Ara Begum, Mehdi Hassan, Ghulam Ali and many others from the 1950s to the 1980s.

When these artists performed on Pakistan Television shows, they frequently selected Mian Shaukat Hussain as tabla player to accompany them on stage. Also riding on a wave of success, Mian Shaukat Hussain toured Europe, Africa, India and Bangladesh with these artists. Another contemporary famous tabla player in Pakistan is Tari Khan, who is now known as the Prince of Tabla of Pakistan, was also a disciple of Mian Shaukat Hussain, "who is said to be a 'ditto copy' of the great ustad" – according to a major newspaper of Pakistan, The Friday Times.

The same newspaper also states, "In the early 1990s, Ustad Zakir Hussain (musician), India's famous young tabla player, paid a visit to Pakistan and was performing at Lahore's Pearl Continental Hotel. When Ustad Shaukat Hussain walked in, Zakir stopped playing, came down from the stage, stooped before Shaukat and presented him with 'nazrana', declaring that while his own father, the great Ustad Alla Rakha, was in India at present, his musical father was right here in front of him."

== Awards and recognition ==
- Amir Khusrow Music Award in 1979
- Amir Khusrow Music Award in 1983
- Pride of Performance Award by the President of Pakistan in 1985

== Death ==
Mian Shaukat Hussain retired in 1992 and died 4 years later on 25 January 1996 of kidney failure. His on-stage tabla performances showed his high level of skills. According to a major Pakistani newspaper, Ustad Shaukat Hussain has been ranked amongst the finest tabla players of Pakistan.

== See also ==
Some other prominent tabla players:

- Ahmed Jan Thirakwa
- Alla Rakha
- Zakir Hussain
- Ustad Tafu
- Tari Khan
