= Rashid Mustafa Thirakwa =

Indian musician

Rashid Mustafa Thirakwa or Rashid Mustafa (born 1964) is a noted tabla player from India.

He was empanelled in the Indian Council for Cultural Relations in 2010 under the category Tabla for Hindustani classical music.

== Awards and recognition ==
Mustafa was awarded the Thirakwa Award by Bharatiya Vidya Bhavan in 1984 and also received the Crystal Award from Yehudi Menuhin in Davos, Switzerland.

== Early life and classical music training ==
Rashid Mustafa Thirakwa was born in 1964. He was initiated into playing tabla at the age of four just like his famous uncle Ahmed Jan Thirakwa, a Padma Bhushan award recipient in 1970. He received initial training in tabla under his father Mohammad Jan Thirakwa and then, received intensive training until age 12, from his uncle Ustad Ahmed Jan Thirakwa from Farukhabad Gharana of Hindustani music who died in 1976. Rashid Mustafa is the fifth generation in the family of musicians and tabla players.

Over the years, Rashid Mustafa has developed his own style of tabla playing which include the tabla gharanas of Farukhabad gharana, Delhi gharana, Lucknow gharana, Ajrada gharana, Punjab gharana and Benaras gharana.

Since 1995, Rashid Mustafa Thirakwa has given tabla-playing performances at the death anniversaries of his tabla-guru and uncle Ustad Ahmed Jan Thirakwa (1892 - 13 January 1976).

== Live Performances ==
- 'Parampara' presented by Parichay Foundation with performances from Padma Vibhushan Guru Hariprasad Chaurasia Ji With Ustad Rashid Mustafa Thirakwa at Sri Sathya Sai International Centre, Pragati Vihar, Lodhi Road, New Delhi 110003
- Commonwealth Games 2010, New Delhi
- London Jazz Festival 2015
- India Habitat Centre 2016

== Discography ==
- Lehren = लेहरें-Talat Aziz (LP, Album) Music India, 1983
- The Maestro's Musings -Amjad Ali Khan(LP) CBS, 1986
- The Album-Amjad Ali Khan(CD, Comp) Sirocco 2, CBS, 1988
- Sarod-Amjad Ali Khan Music today, 19991
- Swar Sameer-Ustad Amjad Ali Khan (CD, Album) Super Cassettes Industries Ltd., T-Series, 1991
- Music Of The Sitar-Pandit Partho Das JVC, 1992
- Moods 'N' Melodies-Rachna Subhalakshmi and Rashid Mustafa and various other artists, T-Series, SCI, 1992
- Raga Bahar - Instrumental Wizards (3xCD) -with Ustad Amjad Ali Khan, Sony Music, 2015
