= Arvind Mulgaonkar =

- Born: Arvind Mulgaonkar; October 10, 1937; Mumbai, Bombay Presidency, British India (present-day Maharashtra, India)
- Origin: India
- Died: February 28, 2018 (aged 80) Mumbai, Maharashtra, India
- Genre: Hindustani classical music
- Occupations: Musician, Musicologist, Author
- Instrument: Tabla

Arvind Mulgaonkar (10 October 1937 – 28 February 2018) was an Indian Hindustani classical tabla player, musicologist, and author belonging to the Farrukhabad gharana. A senior disciple of Ustad Amir Hussain Khan, he was known for his extensive research on tabla gharana traditions and compositions. He was a recipient of the Sangeet Natak Akademi Award, India's highest national honor given to practicing artists in the performing arts, awarded for his contributions to Hindustani instrumental music.

== Early life and musical training ==
Mulgaonkar was born in Mumbai, Maharashtra. He received his initial training in tabla under Babalal Islampurkar. He later received instruction under Baburao Gokhale before studying under Ustad Amir Hussain Khan, the exponent of the Farrukhabad gharana, under whom he received advanced training for fourteen years in traditional gharana repertoire. He also sought guidance from other classical masters, including Ustad Ahmed Jan Thirakwa, Rangnath Majumdar, and Arvind Majumdar.

== Career and musicology ==
Mulgaonkar performed extensively across India, accompanying prominent vocalists and instrumentalists of Hindustani classical music. In addition to his performing career, he dedicated a major part of his life to research, archival work, and documentation of rare tabla compositions (bandishes).

He authored the Marathi reference books Tabla and Aathvanincha Doh (dedicated to Amir Hussain Khan), which document the history, aesthetics, and repertoire of various tabla gharanas. He was also instrumental in establishing the Bandish Tabla Art Promotion Trust in Mumbai to preserve and present traditional repertoire through lecture-demonstrations and performances.

== Awards and recognition ==
- 2016: Sangeet Natak Akademi Award for Hindustani Instrumental Music (Tabla).
- State Award from the Government of Maharashtra (1992).
