= Subhankar Banerjee =

Subhankar Banerjee may refer to:

- Subhankar Banerjee (musician) (1966–2021), Indian classical musician and tabla player of the Farukhabad gharana
- Subhankar Banerjee (photographer) (born 1967), Indian photographer
