= Karamatullah Khan =

Indian tabla player (1919–2000)

- Born: Karamatullah Khan; 17 May 1917; Rampur, United Provinces of Agra and Oudh, British Raj (now in Uttar Pradesh, India)
- Died: 3 December 1977 (aged 60); Kolkata, West Bengal, India
- Occupation: Tabla player
- Known for: Hindustani classical music
- Notable credit(s): Performed with Faiyaz Khan, Ravi Shankar, Hariprasad Chaurasia
- Children: Sabir Khan
- Awards: Sangeet Natak Akademi Award in 1976

Karamatullah Khan (17 May 1917 – 3 December 1977) was an Indian tabla player who specialised in the Farrukhabad tradition of Hindustani Classical music. He is known as an icon of the Farrukhabad gharana, a prolific creator of tabla compositions, a soloist (which was novel at the time), and an accompanist to many celebrated instrumentalists and vocalists of the 20th century.

== Background ==
Khan was born to an extensive family of musicians from the Farrukhabad gharana and represented its thirty-second generation. His father and guru was acclaimed tabla maestro Masit Khan.

After formative years in Rampur, where his family were court musicians, Khan became the court musician to the Maharaja of Raigarh.

== Legacy ==
Khan is credited with popularizing tabla in West Bengal.

He was conferred the Sangeet Natak Akademi Award in 1976 for his contributions to music.

== Personal life ==
Khan's son and disciple, Sabir Khan, is also a tabla maestro.
