= Women Who Win =

American nonprofit women's organization

- Type: Not-for-profit
- Founded: 2020
- Founder: Shaleen Sheth; Dr. Deepa Jhaveri; Dr. Manju Sheth
- Headquarters: Boston, Massachusetts, United States
- Area served: Worldwide

Women Who Win is a 501(c)(3) nonprofit women's organization headquartered in Boston, Massachusetts. It was co-founded by Shaleen Sheth, Dr. Deepa Jhaveri, and Dr. Manju Sheth. The organization runs a platform for women to share their experiences and connect with peers. It reportedly operates in 80 countries, with Dr. Manju Sheth serving as the President of the organization.

== History ==
Established in 2020 by three South Asian women residing in the Boston area—Dr. Manju Sheth, Shaleen Sheth, and Dr. Deepa Jhaveri—Women Who Win was formed in response to the COVID-19 pandemic. The organization focuses on promoting women's empowerment and has collaborated with various institutions, including Bank of America, Linkedin, Asian American Commission, Akshaya Patra Foundation, and Asian Community Fund-Boston Foundation. In 2021, Women Who Win partnered with the United India Association of New England to host a virtual International Women’s Day event, with Massachusetts Senate President Karen E. Spilka as a keynote speaker. In 2022, Women Who Win started The Shoe Project to provide quality footwear to individuals in need in the Greater Boston area during colder months. The initiative targeted vulnerable populations, including Haitian refugees, women’s shelter residents, and adult day health centers. With partnerships including Hoka Apparel, the project received support from organizations such as IMANE, Boston Medical Center, APMA, Deckers X Lab, Lion’s Club, and Rotary Club. The organization is presided by Manju, also a former president of Indian Medical Association of New England and host of an American talk show. On its third anniversary, the organization released its first book, featuring the stories of 100 women. The book was released on January 16, 2024. The book’s foreword was written by activist and actress Shabana Azmi.

== Awards & recognition ==
In December 2020, the Women Who Win team received the Leadership in Women Empowerment award from the Indian Medical Association of New England (IMANE) during their virtual annual gala. Co-Founder Shaleen Sheth was recognized by The Massachusetts Asian American Pacific Islanders Commission and featured on Boston Inno's 25 under 25 list in 2023. She was also honored with the Leadership in Women Empowerment award by Akshaya Patra USA. The India Association of Greater Boston (IAGB) awarded Women Who Win the Trailblazer of the Year Award for their contributions to the community. Additionally, in 2020, the organization was recognized by the Indian Medical Association of New England for their educational Women’s Health Series. In 2022, they were a finalist for the Digital Women for Good award by Digital Women Co.
