= Dhruba Ghosh =

Indian classical musician and Sarangi player from Mumbai

- Born: 1957; Mumbai, Maharashtra, India
- Died: 10 July 2017 (aged 60); Mumbai, Maharashtra, India
- Occupations: Musician; Music teacher Author
- Known for: Sarangi
- Parent(s): Nikhil Ghosh; Usha Nayampally
- Awards: Sangeet Natak Akademi Award

Dhruba Ghosh (1957–2017) was an Indian classical musician and Sarangi player from Mumbai.

== Biography ==
Dhruba Ghosh was born in 1957 in Mumbai. His father Padma Bhushan Pt Nikhil Ghosh was a famous musician, teacher and writer, known his proficiency on the percussion instrument of tabla. He is the nephew of Pt Pannalal Ghosh, famous flute player and composer. Dhruba Ghosh learned the basics of sarangi from Dattaram Parvatakar of All India Radio, Ustad Ali Akbar Khan and Ustad Sagiruddin Khan. His brother Nayan Ghosh is also a musician and a tabla player. His sister Tulika Ghosh is a singer in the Hindustani musical tradition. He worked in 'Miho: A journey to the mountain', a musical album. This album won the Grammy Award. He also worked in various fusion albums. Pandit Dhruba Ghosh died 10 July 2017 in Mumbai, India.

He also studied under the guidance of vocalist Pandit Dinkar Kaikini.

== Albums ==
- Miho: A journey to the mountain

== Awards ==
- Sangeet Nataka Akademi Award
- Paul Winter Consort, an American musical band including Dhruba Ghosh won the Grammy Award.

== Disciples ==
Unfortunately, very few disciples of his are known, some of them are: 1. Yuji Nakagawa, http://yujisarangi.com/ 2. Vanraj Shastri 3. Deepak Paramshivan, https://www.deepakparamashivan.com/
