= Shaikh Dawood Khan =

Indian tabla player (1916 - 1992)

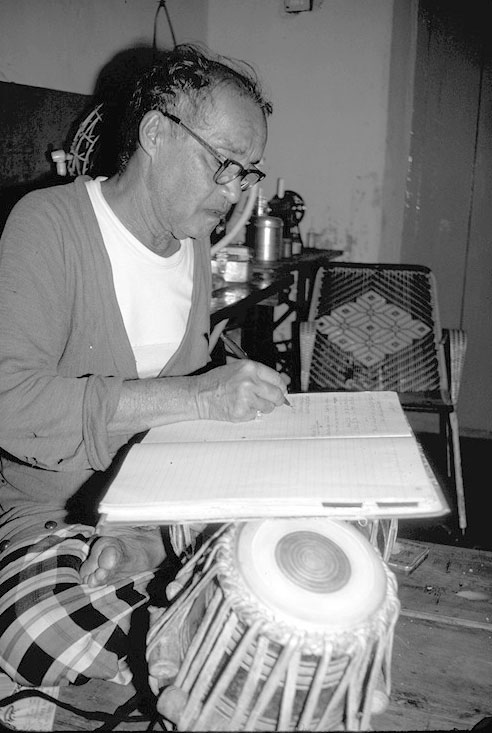

Background information
- Born: 16 December 1916; Sholapur, Maharashtra, British India
- Died: 21 March 1992 (aged 75); Hyderabad, Andhra Pradesh, India
- Genres: tabla
- Occupation(s): Musician, Teacher
- Instrument: Tabla
- Years active: 1928 – 1989
- Labels: Awards include: Sangeet Natak Akademi Award in 1991

Shaikh Dawood Khan (16 December 1916 – 21 March 1992), also known as Ustad Shaikh Dawood, Ustad Sheikh Dawood and Daud Khan, was a performer on the Indian tabla. He was formerly a staff artist at All India Radio, Hyderabad, India.

== Early life and career ==
Shaikh Dawood Khan was born in Sholapur, Maharashtra on 16 December 1916. His father Hashim Sahib was a draughtsman in the PWD (Public Works Department), Bijapur, Karnataka, India.

Shaikh Dawood received his training under several notable masters. These include Mohammad Kasim of Sholapur, Ustad Alladiya Khan of Hyderabad, Ustad Mohammad Khan of Hyderabad, Ustad Chote Khan of Hyderabad, and Ustad Mehboob Khan Mirajkar.

In his lifetime, he accompanied most of the great musicians of the era. These include Aftab-e-Mausiki Ustad Faiyaz Khan, Ustad Vilayat Hussain Khan (vocalist), Ustad Bade Ghulam Ali Khan, Ustad Barkat Ali Khan, Roshanara Begum, Abdul Wahid Khan (Begum Akhtar's guru), Pandit Bhimsen Joshi, Pandit Shiv Dayal Batish (Vocalist at All India Radio), Pandit Sawai Gandharva, Pandit Basawaraj Raj Guru, Nazakat and Salamat Ali Khan, Mushtaq Hussain Khan, Pandit D. V. Paluskar, Pandit Vinayakrao Patwardhan, Ustad Allaudin Khan, Ustad Ali Akbar Khan, Girija Devi, Pandit Ravi Shankar and Ustad Vilayat Khan (sitar player).

== Awards and recognition ==
In his life he received numerous awards:

- Sangeet Natak Akademi Award - 1991

Unfortunately he was too ill to attend the award ceremony and died shortly after the awards ceremony.

- Hindu-Muslim Unity Front Award in 1975
