= Nityanand Haldipur =

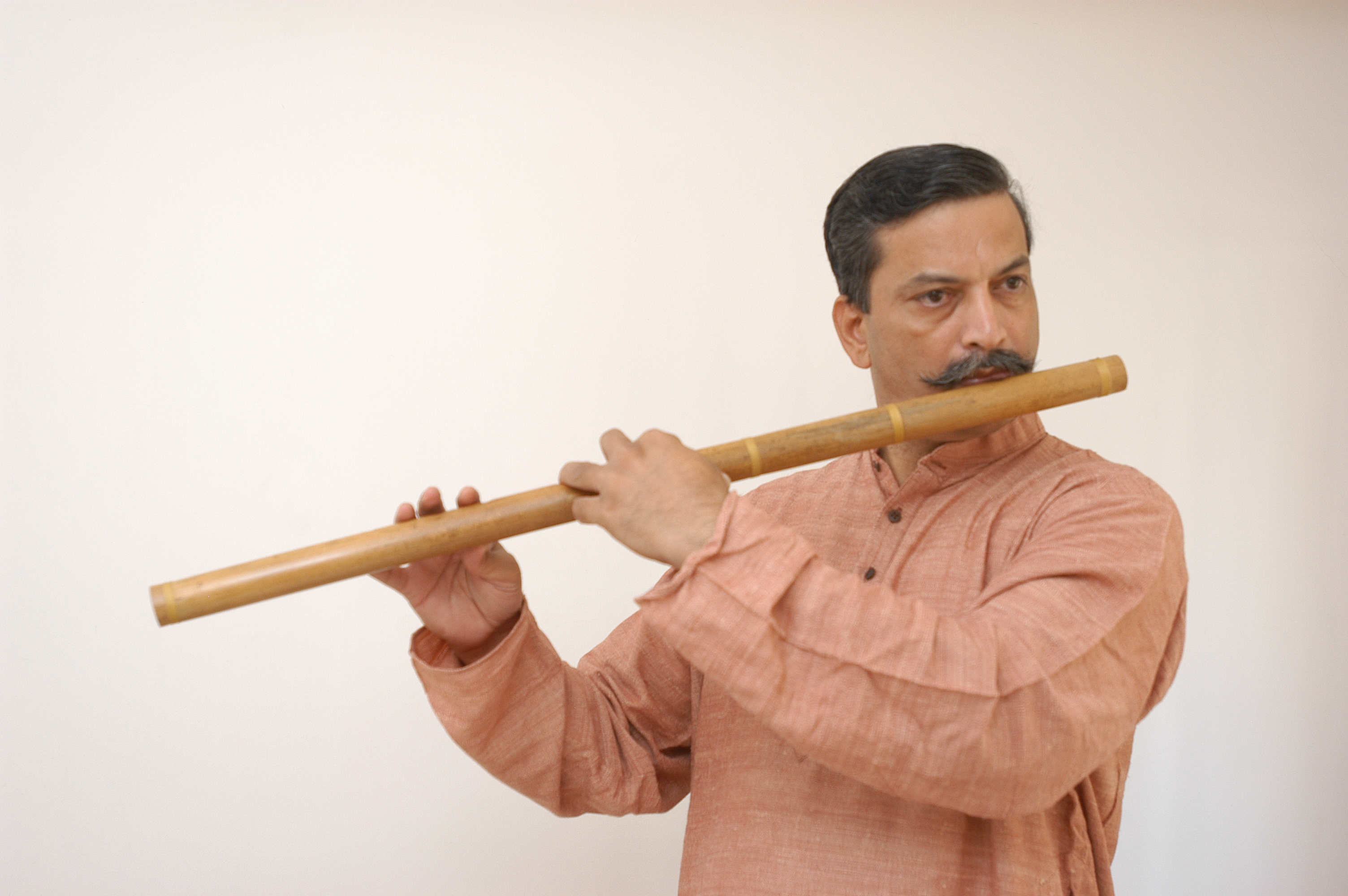

Background information
- Born: 1948 (age 77–78); Mumbai, India
- Occupation: Flautist
- Instrument: Bansuri
- Website: http://www.nityanandhaldipur.com/

Nityanand Haldipur (born 7 May 1948) is a performer and teacher of the Indian flute, known in India as the flutist. He is a purist in the true Maihar Gharana tradition and learned from Ma Annapurna Devi, in Mumbai, India. He has been rated as a "top grade" artist by the All India Radio and was awarded the prestigious Sangeet Natak Academi award in 2010.

== Musical profile ==
=== Student life ===
Nityanand was born in Mumbai into a musical family and showed indications of prodigious abilities at a very young age. His father, Niranjan Haldipur, a senior disciple of Pannalal Ghosh, initiated him into the art of flute-playing. Over the next two decades, Nityanand's training continued under the late Chidanand Nagarkar, and Devendra Murdeshwar. From 1986, Nityanand had been a disciple of Padma Bhushan Annapurna Devi, doyenne of the Maihar gharana.

== Musical oeuvre ==
=== Performer ===
He has performed at various musical events worldwide:

- India – New Delhi – South Asian Association For Regional Cooperation(SAARC) summit, Ahmedabad, Ajmer, Allahabad, Alwar, Amravati, Aurangabad, Bangalore.

=== Composer ===
Haldipur has composed music for several radio shows and for wellness programs like spiritual healing therapy, stress management and art of relaxation. He has collaborated with musicians of different genres like Robert Giannetti.

== Awards ==
Haldipur has received the following awards:

Haldipur was awarded the SaMaPa award in 2024. The SaMaPa award was created by the Founding Chairmanm, Pandit Bhajan Sopori ji, to create national level platform for presentation, propagation, and teaching of traditional music and performing arts for the artists. SaMaPa is acclaimed as the Cultural Bridge of Jammu & Kashmir with the rest of the country and to have created a new generation of music connoisseurs.

‘Vitasta’, the ancient name of River Jhelum of Kashmir, symbolizes the cultural ethos of Kashmir. ‘SaMaPa Vitasta Award’, a National level honour pertaining to Jammu & Kashmir, has been instituted to honour the senior musicians of India who contribute to propagating and preserving the cultural heritage of the country. It has been a symbol of love, harmony, art and culture and Shaivite-Sufi tradition of Kashmir.

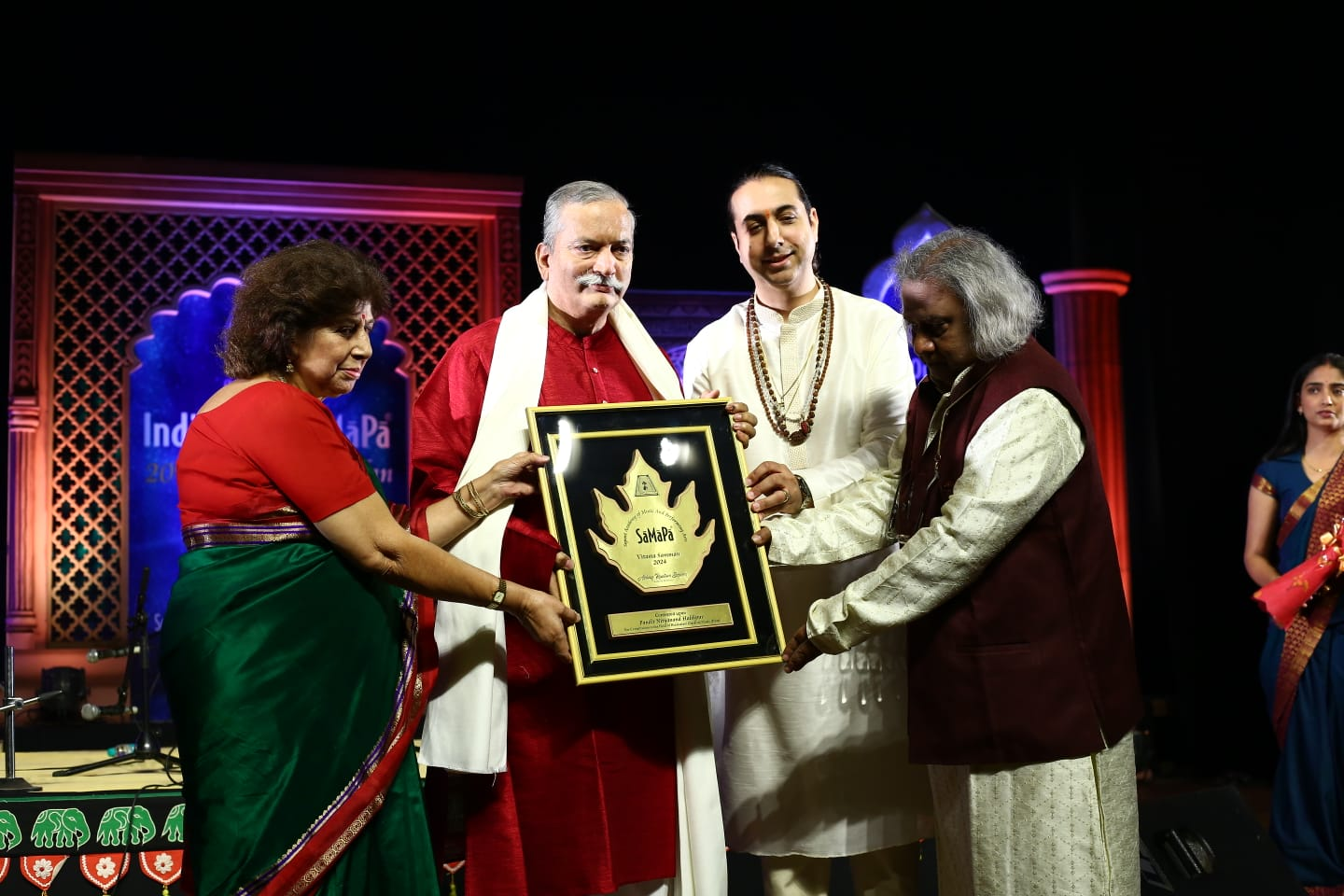

- https://www.hindustantimes.com/entertainment/winners-of-2024-samapa-awards-announced-101731588406353.html
- https://www.ptinews.com/story/entertainment/Winners-of-2024-SaMaPa-awards-announced/1983407
- https://www.dailyexcelsior.com/pt-abhay-sopori-announces-samapa-awards-2024/

T. Chowdayya Rashtriya Prashasti - 2022-2023. Awarded on 31 January 2024 by the Government of Karnataka

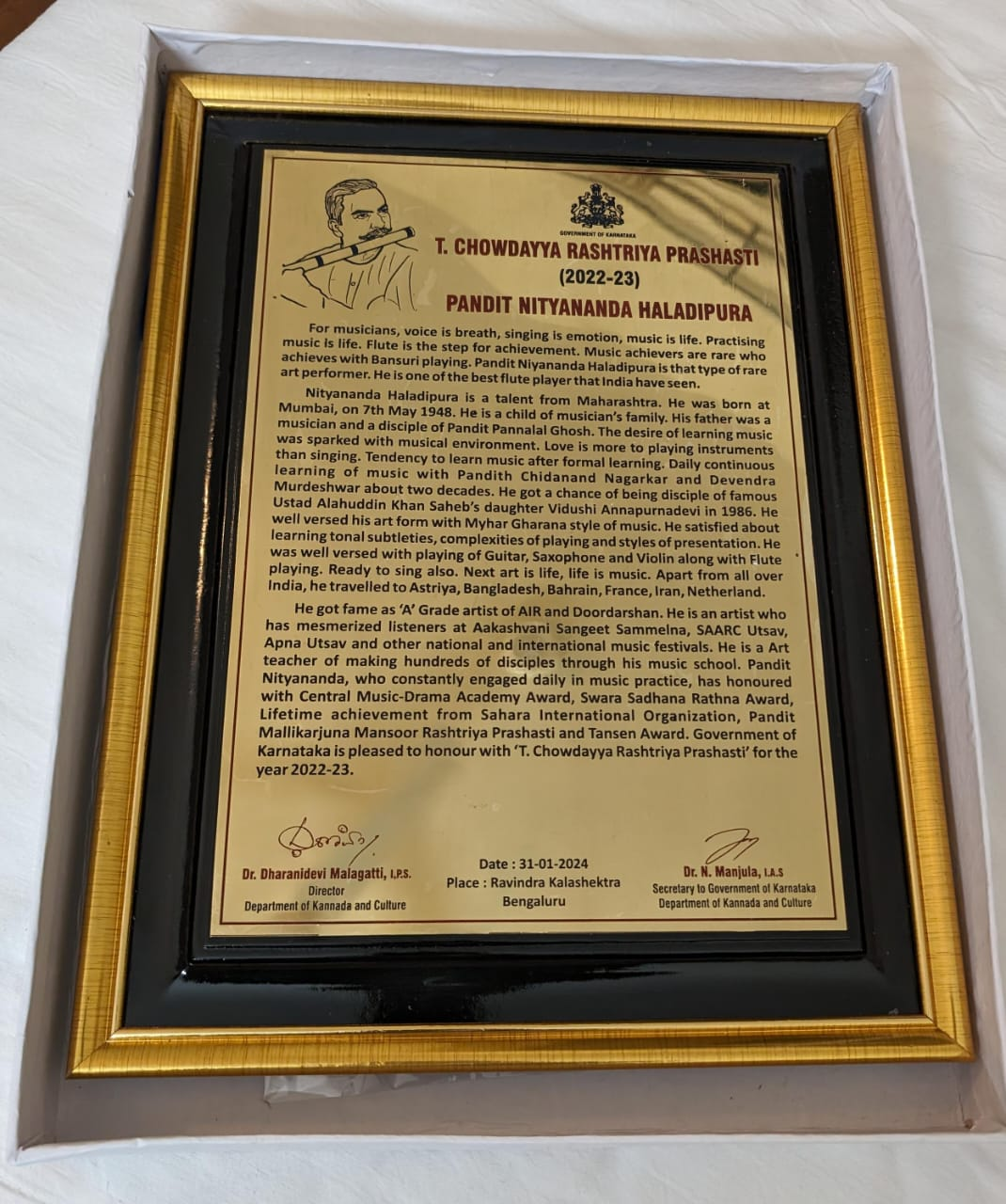

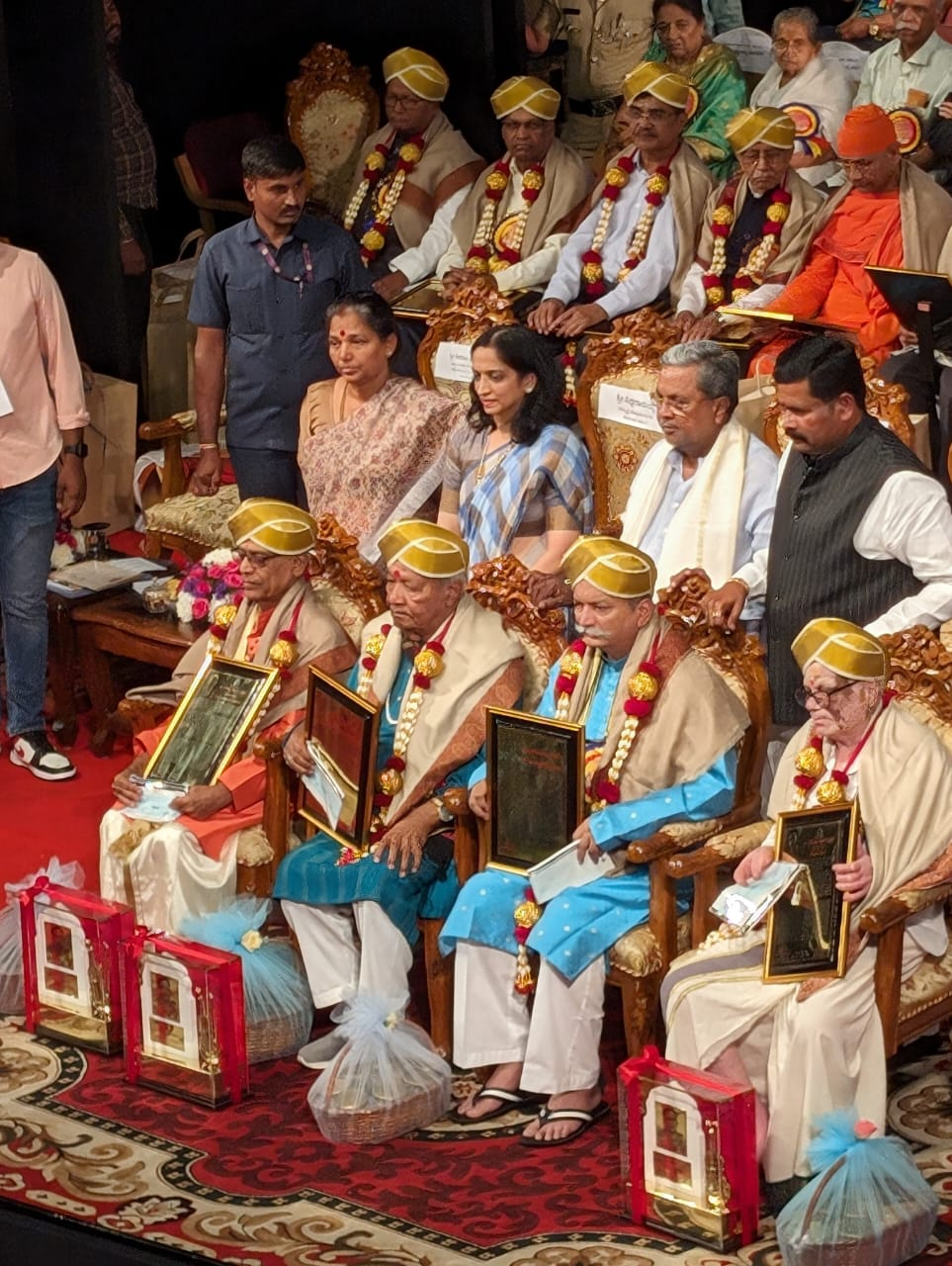
Chowdayya Award Ceremony

Dr. Mallikarjun Mansur award by the State Government of Karnataka – 2022

Tansen Sanman award by the Government of Madhya Pradesh – 2021

- Sangeet Natak Akademi Award (2010).

Swarasadhan Samiti conferred: – Swara Sadhna Ratna

Sahara International: – Lifetime achievement award

Sanskritik Foundation New Delhi conferred Fellowship

Odisa Akademy of Tribal Culture Research & Arts: – Bharat Gaurav.

Amulya Jyoti Foundation: – Venu Ratna.

Salt Lake Kolkata: – Jadubhatt Award.

== See also ==
- Hindustani classical music
- Indian musical instruments
- Bansuri/Flute
