= Bead Game =

1977 Canadian film by Ishu Patel

- Directed by: Ishu Patel
- Produced by: Derek Lamb (executive producer)
- Music by: Jnan Prakash Ghosh
- Distributed by: National Film Board of Canada
- Release date: 1977
- Running time: 6 minutes
- Country: Canada
- Language: English

Bead Game (French: Histoire de perles) is a 1977 animated short film by Ishu Patel, created by arranging beads into the shapes of real and mythical creatures, who absorb and devour one another, thus, evolving into scenes of modern human warfare. Jnan Prakash Ghosh provides music for the 5 min 35 second film, which was produced at the National Film Board of Canada.

The film's technique was inspired by the beadwork of Inuit women. The increasing aggression shown by the creatures in Bead Game was intended as a cautionary tale about human hostility and nuclear weapons. Patel made the film in response to India's development of nuclear weapons.

== Plot ==
A single bead multiplies into two beads. From there, they continue to expand, turning into Atoms which eventually transform into creatures. These creatures magically ingest each other then mutate into other mythical beings. For example, a monster eats a dinosaur then transforms into a seal. This sequence displays how creatures deal with conflict without the control of brain power.

As the cycle continues, the beads eventually turn into humans. The chronological arrangement demonstrates how civilization has dealt with conflict inspired by creatures of the past, only now, with the advancement of technology in terms of the weapons used. For example, in its earliest sequence, it shows humans blasting cannons into enemy territory. It then moves on to humans shooting rifles during war.

The last image is a hopeful one, or at least one that holds a hopeful possibility. After showing the culmination of humanity's military brilliance in a burst of Atomic Bomb, the scene is echoed with trees in place of mushroom clouds, with a central character ultimately placing the atom in the middle of a cat's cradle. It's a peaceful image, but a fragile one, too, without the inevitability of the earlier apocalypse.

The entirety of the short film is based on how different time periods dealt with competition, in this case, it is displayed through malicious actions shown through the evolution of the beads.

To accentuate the seemingly unbroken chain of evolution over centuries, Patel chose to film the beads themselves growing in a constant flow of movement into larger and more complex creatures and images, with the camera continuously zooming out to accommodate the escalation; this requires him to film on a continual basis without deviating from whatever path he had taken once filming began, and cuts had to be kept to an absolute minimum.

== Mythical concepts as film identity ==
The use of mythical creatures became part of Patel's film identity. From his first film for the National Film Board of Canada, How Death Came to Earth (1971), based on Indian creation myths, through The Bead Game (1977), where thousands of beads are painstakingly arranged and manipulated into constantly changing shapes (Academy Awards nomination for animated short; BAFTA for short fiction film), Afterlife (1978), which offers an impressionistic view of death and dying (Canadian Film Award; Montréal World Film Festival Grand Prize for short film), to Divine Fate(1993) and The Tibetan Book of the Dead: The Great Liberation (1994), Ishu Patel has pursued his project of animating religious/mythical concepts and tales with great beauty and style.

== Music ==
Jnan Prakash Ghosh created the musical background to the Bead Game. The music creates a more intense dynamic that complements the overall theme of the short film. The animation ties perfectly with the beat of the music, producing smooth transitions when the creatures transform.

== Awards ==
Awards for Bead Game include a BAFTA Award for best short fictional film, a Bronze Plaque in the art and culture category at the Columbus International Film & Video Festival, a Golden Gate Award for outstanding achievement at the San Francisco International Film Festival, and a Special Prize for Animation at the International Leipzig Festival for Documentary and Animated Film. The film was also nominated for an Academy Award for Best Animated Short Film at the 50th Academy Awards, losing to another NFB animated short, The Sand Castle.

It was a Canadian Film Award nominee for Best Animated Short Film at the 28th Canadian Film Awards in 1977.
