= Aditya Kalyanpur =

Indian table player (born 1978)

- Born: 21 July 1978 (age 48); Mumbai, Maharashtra, India
- Genre: Hindustani classical music
- Occupation: Musician
- Instrument: tabla
- Years active: 32
- Label: AK Productions
- Website: adityakalyanpur.com

Aditya Kalyanpur (born 21 July 1978) is an Indian Tabla Maestro. He belongs to the Punjab gharana.

== Early life and background ==
Aditya Kalyanpur was born in Mumbai, India.

He began his studies at the age of five under the guidance of Tabla Maestro late Alla Rakha Khan and his son Zakir Hussain.

He is a commerce graduate from Mithibai College.

== Performing career ==
Aditya Kalyanpur was initially known for his debut performance with his guru Zakir Hussain for the Wah Taj! commercial when he was 11 years old.

His style is characterized by clear and precise articulation of syllables, rhythmic precision, a broad repertoire of compositions, and an extensive use of improvisational techniques.

He has accompanied artists including Shivkumar Sharma, Amjad Ali Khan, Prabha Atre, N. Rajam, Sultan Khan, Shahid Parvez, Vishwa Mohan Bhatt, Satish Vyas, Shujaat Khan, and Nayan Ghosh. He has also accompanied Carnatic performers including T. N. Krishnan, N. Ramani, U. Shrinivas, and Lalgudi Krishnan. Kalyanput went on tour with A.R. Rahman for his JAI HO World Tour! He can be heard on Katy Perry's "Legendary Lovers" from her album "Prism," has recorded with Keith Richards of The Rolling Stones.

== Awards ==
- "TOP" Grade Artist of All India Radio
- 'Taal – Mani' by Sur Singar Samiti
- Vidyasagar Award, ITC
- Sangeet Visharad
- National Scholarship for Advanced Training, Government of India
- Awardee of Pandit Jasraj Competition, Vedic Heritage Center, Long Island, New York

== Performances ==
- Orient Arts Festival, Estonia
- Edinburgh festival, Scotland (2003)
- Earagal Arts Festival, Ireland
- Jazz Yatra, Mumbai
- Great Lakes Folk Festival, Lansing, Michigan
- Saptak Festival
