= Rimpa Siva =

Indian musician (born 1986)

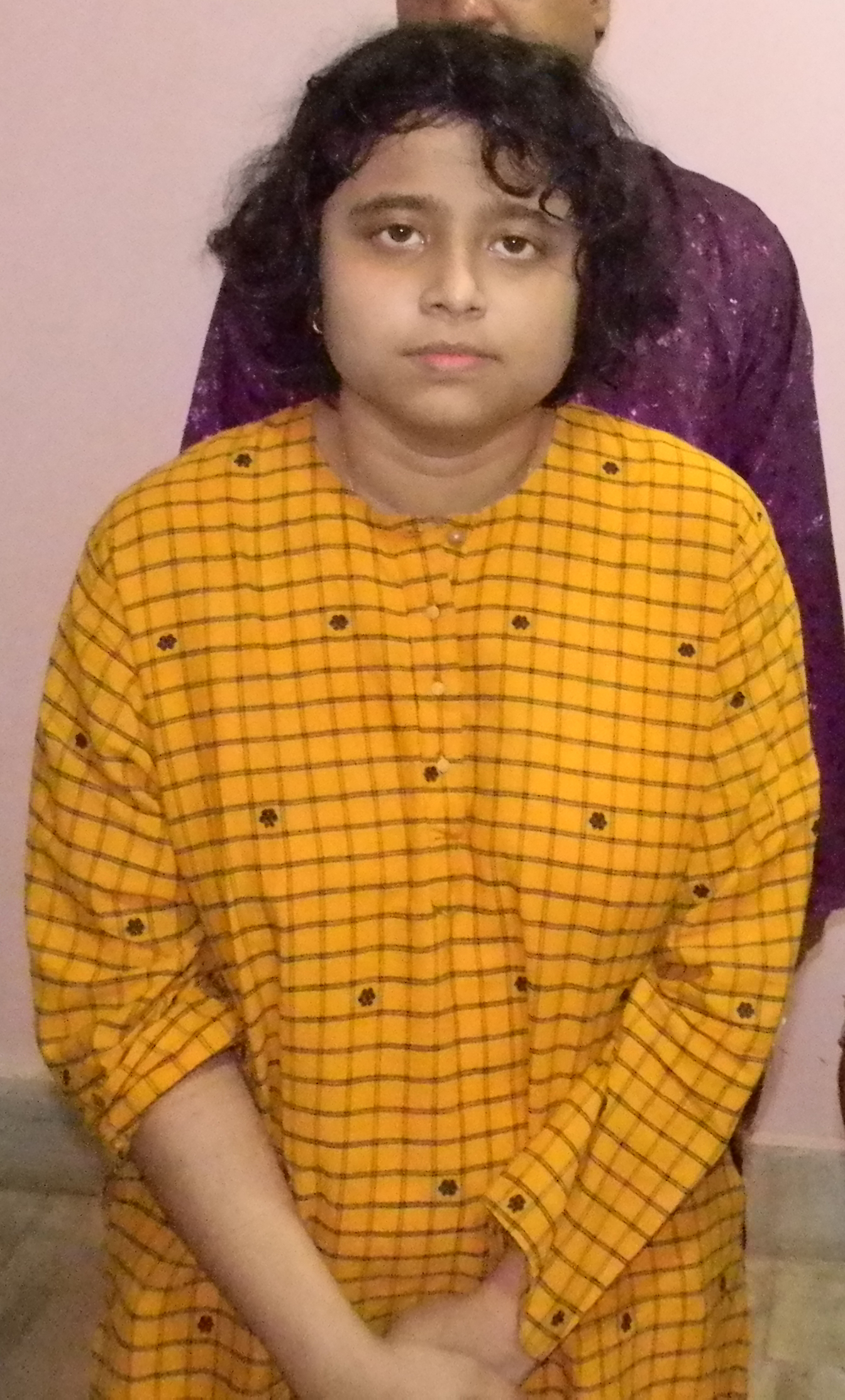
- Rimpa Siva at Bhubaneswar, 2011

Background information
- Born: 1 January 1986 (age 39)
- Origin: India
- Genres: Indian classical
- Years active: 1996–present
- Labels: cup
- Website: www.zamanproduction.com/en/artist/rimpa-siva

Rimpa Siva (born 1986) is an Indian musician known for being one of the few female tabla players. She was taught to play the Farukhabad gharana style by her father, Prof. Swapan Siva. She was the subject of the 1999 French documentary film Rimpa Siva: Princess of Tabla.

Under her father's guidance, Rimpa Siva gave her first stage performance in Kolkata at the age of eight. She subsequently performed at various music festivals and concerts, including a notable appearance in the United States while she was in Standard VI, followed by performances in the Netherlands and the United Kingdom.

== Education and career ==
Siva earned her M.A. from Rabindra Bharati University and received several honours, including the Shamukha Sangeet Shiramani Award in Mumbai, the Indian Music Academy’s President Award, and the Sangeet Natak Akademi Award.
