= Brian J. G. Pereira =

American nephrologist

Brian J. G. Pereira is a nationally recognized expert on kidney disease and nephrology. He is currently president and CEO of Visterra, Inc. He also serves as an adjunct Professor of Medicine at Tufts University School of Medicine, the Sackler School of Graduate Biomedical Sciences, and the Tufts Clinical and Translational Science Institute (CTSI).

Pereira is originally from Mangalore, India. He is the alumni of St. Aloysius College (Bangalore). He earned an MBBS degree from St. Johns Medical College in Bangalore, an MD in Internal Medicine and a DM in Nephrology from the Post Graduate Institute in Chandigarh, and an MBA from the Kellogg School of Management at Northwestern University. He has published more than 200 articles in medical journals, delivered more than 500 invited lectures, served on the board of 12 scientific journals and edited the widely used textbook “Chronic Kidney Disease, Dialysis and Transplantation”, according to Dr Manju Sheth.

From 1993 to 2005, Pereira held various positions at Tufts Medical Center, including serving as Interim Chief Operating Officer in 2001, and president and chief executive officer of a physician organization from October 2001 to November 2005. He was the president of the National Kidney Foundation from 2002 to 2004, and has served on the editorial board of twelve scientific journals. Pereira is on the board of directors/trustees of Biodel, Visterra, NephroPlus, Africa Healthcare Network, and American India Foundation.

He has previously been a director of the National Kidney Foundation, Aksys, Kidney Care Partners, Tengion, Wellbound, and Satellite Health Care. In addition, Pereira was a member of the advisory boards of Amgen and Sigma-Tau Pharmaceuticals along with several other organizations.

He served as president and CEO of AMAG Pharmaceuticals (formerly Advanced Magnetics) from 2006 to 2011. At AMAG, Pereira raised four financing rounds at increasing valuations and built the clinical development and manufacturing infrastructure for the company’s iron therapy product for anemia. In July 2013, Pereira was appointed as president and CEO of Visterra, Inc., a company that is advancing product candidates into human clinical trials for infectious diseases.
