= Devendra Murdeshwar =

Devendra Murdeshwar (19 September 1923 – 29 January 2000) was an Indian bansuri flutist.

== Early life ==
Murdeshwar was born in 1923 in a Brahmin family in Masur in the Mysore State in Karnataka. His father played the violin, tabla and the bansuri flute as a hobby. Devendra first also learned the flute and tabla before shifting to the flute.

== Career ==
He had an early interest in music. In 1941 he went to Bombay to study under Pannalal Ghosh. He was a staff artist at All India Radio Delhi. Through his work he came in contact with musicians such as Allauddin Khan, Omkarnath Thakur, Mallikarjun Mansur and Bade Ghulam Ali Khan. Along with Pannalal Ghosh, he was one of India's leading flutists in the 20th century. He trained a number of students including Nityanand Haldipur, Vijay Kabinhittal, Ravindra Samant, Naresh Kumta and many more aspiring artistes.

== Death ==
Murdeshwar died on 29 January 2000 from a heart attack aged 77.
