= Zoya Agarwal =

Indian pilot

- Born: Delhi, India
- Occupation: Aircraft pilot
- Employer: Air India

Zoya Agarwal is an Indian commercial pilot who has flown for Air India. In 2021, Agarwal captained an all-woman crew making the inaugural flight from San Francisco to Bengaluru, one of the longest non-stop air routes in the world.

== Career ==
In 2006, The Times of India highlighted Agarwal as a rising female aviator in India. She became the youngest woman pilot in India to fly a Boeing-777 in 2013. As a precautionary measure during the COVID-19 pandemic, the Government of India initiated Vande Bharat Mission in May 2020 to evacuate around 14,800 Indians from twelve countries on sixty-four Air India flights. Agarwal was chosen to co-pilot the first repatriation flight by the airline.

In 2021, Agarwal captained an all-woman crew making the inaugural flight from San Francisco to Bengaluru, one of the longest non-stop air routes in the world. Later that month, the crew made an appearance on Indian Idol for its Republic Day special episode. Later that year, Agarwal was chosen by the United Nations as its spokesperson for Generation Equality.

In August 2022, Agarwal was commemorated by the U.S.-based San Francisco International Airport aviation museum for her career in aviation and for her promotion of women's empowerment.

With copilots R Someshwar, Sandeep Mukhedkar and Abhay Agarwal, Zoya Agarwal piloted Air India's first Boeing 777 aircraft over the Hindu Kush mountain range. The route cut flight time of one of Delhi's most popular non-stop routes to North America, compared to a route taken since Afghan airspace was closed to non-defence aircraft in August. The airline previously began flying its Boeing 787s over the Hindu Kush mountain range in October.
