= Nayan Ghosh =

Indian Tabla and Sitar maestro (born 1956)

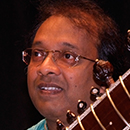
- Ghosh playing the Sitar.

Background information
- Born: 28 April 1956 (age 70)
- Origin: India
- Genre: Hindustani classical music
- Occupations: Musician, Composer, Teacher
- Instruments: Tabla and Sitar
- Years active: 1960–present
- Website: www.nayanghosh.in/index.html

Nayan Ghosh (born 28 April 1956) is an Indian tabla and sitar maestro. He is a tabla player from the Farrukhabad Gharana.

== Performing career ==
Born on 28 April 1956, Pandit Nayan Ghosh received in-depth training in vocal music, Tabla and then in sitar from his late father and Guru Padma Bhushan Pandit Nikhil Ghosh. Nayan’s elder uncle was the flautist Pandit Pannalal Ghosh, who was popularly regarded as the ‘Father of North Indian Flute’. He also received guidance under Ustad Ahmed Jan Thirakwa and Pandit Jnan Prakash Ghosh's supervision. He received extensive training in sitar and vocal music from his father Pandit Nikhil Ghosh and later additionally learnt from Pandit Buddhadev Das Gupta.

His first tabla solo broadcast was at the age of 4, in 1960.

As an accompanist too, he has supported Pandit Ravi Shankar, Ustad Vilayat Khan, Pandit Nikhil Banerjee, Pandit Jasraj, Pandit Shiv Kumar Sharma, Ustad Amjad Ali Khan, Ustad Rais Khan, Pandit Buddhadev Das Gupta, Ustad Salamat Ali Khan, Ustad Munnawar Ali Khan and many others.

He is currently director of Sangit Mahabharati, in Mumbai, and as distinguished guest professor at the Indian Institute of Technology (IIT), Bombay for their Cell for Human Values. Also taught at Kent State University in Cleveland, Emory University in Atlanta, University of Colorado in Boulder, the Lausanne Music Conservatory in Switzerland and several other reputed educational bodies.

His brother Pandit Dhruba Ghosh was a Sarangi maestro. His son is Ishaan Ghosh, who is a noted tabla player of the younger generation.

== Awards and achievements ==
- Pandit Nayan Ghosh received the Central Sangeet Natak Akademi Award for 2014 for his contribution to Hindustani instrumental music.
- The Lifetime Achievement Award from the Lt. Governor of California in 1998 for his contribution in propagating Indian Classical Music across North America
- The Maharashtra Government Sammaan-Patra in 2015
- The Infosy-Bale Khan Lifetime Achievement Award in 2019 at Bengaluru
- The Padmabhushan Pandit Samta Prasad Lifetime Achievement Award in 2019 at Prayagraj
- The Ustad Shaikh Dawood Khan Lifetime Achievement Award in 2019 at Mumbai
- Honorary doctorate from the Hindustan Art & Music Society (Kolkata) in 2018
- The Pandit Mani Prasad Lifetime Achievement Award in 2019
- The Swar Sadhana Ratna bestowed by Swar Sadhana Samiti, Mumbai (2013), besides many more awards and titles.

== Discography ==
- Nayan Ghosh & Mallar Ghosh – Live at Ali Akbar College of Music, San Anselmo, California (Company: RAGA Records, New York) – Shree Raga, Raga Tilak Kamod.
- Nayan Ghosh & Mallar Ghosh (Company: BOL Records, San Francisco) – Raga Jhinjhoti.
- Nayan Ghosh & Yogesh Samsi – Live in USA concert (Company: QUESTZ World, Kolkata) – Raga Patdeep, Raga Kamod, Khamaj Dadra.
- Nayan Ghosh & Aditya Kalyanpur (Company: Legendary Legacy, Mumbai) – Raga Jhinjhoti.
- Nayan Ghosh & Aditya Kalyanpur (Company: Legendary Legacy, Mumbai) – Raga Bhairav, Raga Kaushi Kanada, Raga Kafi.
- Nayan Ghosh & Subhankar Banerjee Live in Kolkata concert (Company: Bihaan Music, Kolkata) – DVD – Raga Komal Rishabh Asavari, Raga Kaushi Bhairav.
- Nayan Ghosh & Mallar Ghosh (Company: Tapaham, Mumbai) – Live concert in USA – Raga Bihag, Khamaj Kajri, Raga Bhairavi.
- Nayan Ghosh & Paul Grant (Company: ARION, France) – "Dialogue" – Sitar, Santoor & Tabla.
- Nayan Ghosh, Paul Grant, Ross Daly & Bijan Chemirani (Company: ARION, France) – Sitar, Tabla, Santoor, Lyra, Daff & Tombak.
- Nayan Ghosh & Paul Grant (Company: Toledo Records, Geneva) – "Voyage" – Sitar, Surbahar, Tabla, Santoor, Sur-Santoor.

== See also ==
- Pandit Nikhil Ghosh
- Pandit Pannalal Ghosh
- Pandit Jnan Prakash Ghosh
- Ustad Ahmed Jan Thirakwa
- Dhruba Ghosh
- Pandit Buddhadev Das Gupta
- Ishaan Ghosh
