= Subhankar Banerjee (musician) =

Indian musician (1966–2021)

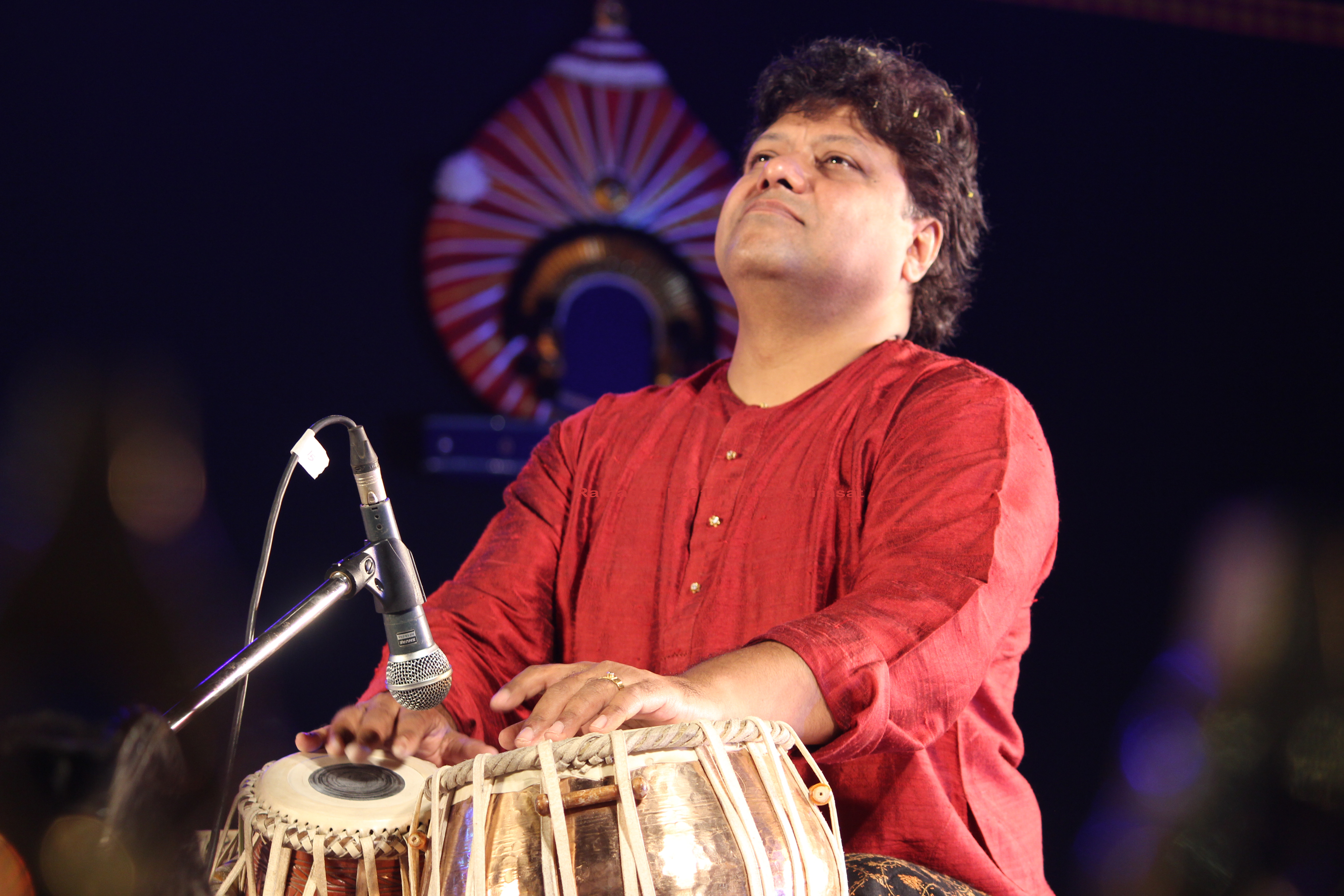

Background information
- Born: 20 August 1966; Kolkata, India
- Origin: India
- Died: 25 August 2021 (aged 55) Kolkata, India
- Genres: Hindustani classical music
- Occupation: Musician
- Instrument: Tabla
- Years active: 1990s–2020s

Subhankar Banerjee (20 August 1966 – 25 August 2021) was an Indian musician and tabla player of the Farukhabad tradition.

== Biography ==
He studied initially with Manik Das of the Benares tradition before learning with Swapan Siva of the Farukhabad tradition, which he is more associated with.

He regularly supported Ravi Shankar, Hariprasad Chaurasia, M. Balamuralikrishna, Amjad Ali Khan, Rashid Khan, Birju Maharaj, and Shivkumar Sharma on stage. He was also a tabla soloist.

Banerjee contracted COVID-19 in June 2021. He died a few months later in August, five days after his 55th birthday.

== See also ==
- Yogesh Samsi
- Kumar Bose
- Swapan Chaudhuri
- Anindo Chatterjee
- Zakir Hussain
