= Pandharinath Nageshkar =

Indian tabla player (1913–2008)

Pandharinath Gangadhar Nageshkar

Background information
- Born: 16 March 1913; Bandivade
- Died: 27 March 2008 (aged 95)
- Instrument: Tabla
- Award: Sangeet Natak Akademi Award (1997)

Pandharinath Gangadhar Nageshkar (16 March 1913 – 27 March 2008) was a prominent tabla player from Goa. He won the 1997 Sangeet Natak Akademi Award for his contribution to Hindustani instrumental music.

== Early and personal life ==
Nageshkar was born on 16 March 1913 in the village of Bandivade. He received his early formal education up to the fifth grade in Nageshi, after which he transitioned to Kolhapur to pursue his higher studies. He comes from a musically inclined family; his wife, Nandita Nageshkar, is an accomplished harmonium player, and his son, Vibhav Nageshkar, has also earned recognition in the field of tabla playing.

== Musical training ==
Nageshkar demonstrated a strong inclination toward the tabla during his childhood, frequently tapping his fingers rhythmically on his own head or stomach. Observing this interest, his maternal uncle, Ganpatrao Nageshkar, began instructing him in the foundational aspects of the instrument. His dedication intensified when the 'Balwant Sangeet Mandali', a theater troupe led by Master Dinanath Mangeshkar, visited his home village. Hearing the tabla playing of Walhemama during these dramatic productions inspired Nageshkar to master the instrument fully, a pursuit in which he also received encouragement from Master Dinanath.

At the age of 14, Nageshkar traveled to Bombay, where he studied tabla playing under Walhemama for a period of two years. Following this, he spent three years training under Subrao Ankolkar. After a subsequent two-year hiatus in his musical education, Nageshkar resumed his training under Ustad Amir Hussain Khan, studying with him from the age of 25 until he was 45. He also trained for shorter intervals under Khan Anchar Hussain Khan and Khan Jatibaksh.

== Career ==
Nageshkar served as an accompanist to numerous celebrated vocalists. He gained significant professional exposure by performing alongside notable classical singers, including Ustad Faiyaz Khan, Ustad Vilayat Hussain Khan, Ustad Khadim Hussain Khan, Pandit Govindrao Agni, Pandit Yashwant B. Joshi, Pandit Patwardhanbuba, Bhargavram Agarekar, and Kesharbai Bandodkar. His performance engagements took him on travels to multiple regions, including Mangalore, South Karnataka, Kolhapur, Bhavnagar, and Nagpur.

== Teaching ==
Nageshkar later established a music school (Sangeet Vidyalaya) dedicated to teaching the art of tabla playing to the public. A variety of musicians trained under his tutelage, including the prominent tabla player Shripad Nageshkar, as well as Gajanan Patwardhan, Vasantrao Ajarekar, Mukund Kane, Vasant Joshi and Suresh Talwalkar.

== Awards and accolades ==
For his contributions to the field of Hindustani instrumental music, he was awarded the Sangeet Natak Akademi Award in 1997. He was also awarded by the Kala Academy.

== Death ==
Nageshkar died on 27 March 2008.
