= Jnan Prakash Ghosh =

- Born: Jnan Prakash Ghosh; 8 May 1909
- Origin: Kolkata, India
- Died: 18 February 1997 (aged 87)
- Genre: Hindustani Classical Music
- Occupations: Tabla player, musicologist
- Instruments: Vocals, Tabla, Harmonium
- Awards: Sangeet Natak Akademi Fellowship (1976); Padma Bhushan (1984)

Pandit Jnan Prakash Ghosh (8 May 1909 – 18 February 1997) was a multi-instrumentalist from the Farukhabad gharana of Hindustani classical music, a composer, an educator, a lyricist, and musicologist. He was an accomplished Tabla and Harmonium player.

== Early life and background ==
Born in a Hindu family with musical background in Kolkata, he was the grandson of Dwarkanath Ghosh (1847–1928), who founded Dwarkin in 1875 and invented the "Dwarkin harmonium", popular in West Bengal, India. He graduated from the Scottish Church College of the University of Calcutta He was keen in sports (he played soccer, hockey, polo and billiards). He also practised painting, but had to discontinue it due to an eye injury in a soccer match.

Then he turned to music. He was trained in vocals by Girija Shankar, Mohammed Sagir Khan and Mohammed Dabir Khan. He took tabla lessons from Masit Khan of the Farukhabad gharana and became his senior disciple. After realising that there is so much more to tabla, he started his tutelage under Ustad Feroz Khan of the Punjab Gharana. It was here that the Punjabi Gharana compositions were introduced to Kolkata folks.

== Career ==
He was the founder of Sourav Academy of Music and closely associated with the 'Sangeet Research Academy'. He scored music for many Bengali films, of which Jadubhatta, Andhare Alo and Rajlakshmi o Srikanta (1958) are worth mentioning. He has composed and directed music to a number of popular gramophone records sung by various artistes. A percussion entitled The Drums of India

He also provided music for the Academy Award nominated animated short Bead Game, directed by Ishu Patel for the National Film Board of Canada. His residence at 25 Dixon Lane in Bowbazar, Kolkata, was frequented by musicians, be it local or those visiting the city, and thus was the venue of several recitals, most notably a Raga Chhayanat performed by Bade Ghulam Ali Khan in 1954.

Amongst his students are tabla players Kanai Dutta, Shyamal Bose, Shankar Ghosh, Anindo Chatterjee, and Nikhil Ghosh, Rajkumar Misra, singers Prasun Banerjee, Ajoy Chakrabarty, Suman Ghosh and Arun Bhaduri, and instrumentalist Paul Grant. His birth centenary was celebrated on 7 May 2012, in Kolkata, with screening of documentary of him and performances by various singers.

== Discography ==
- 1968 – Drums of India, Vol. 1 – Gramophone
- 1979 – Drums of India, Vol. 2 Gramophone
- 1985 - Jugalbandi Harmonium and Violin - EMI
- 1993 – Raga on Keyboard – EMI
- 2004 – Dhun – Saregama
- 2004 – Raag Charukeshi – Saregama
- 2004 – Raag Haripriya – Saregama
- 2004 – Raag Jhinjhoti – Saregama
- 2004 – Raag Mishra Kalengra – Saregama
- 2004 – Raag Shyam Kalyan

== Awards and recognition ==
In 1974, he was awarded the Sangeet Natak Akademi Fellowship the highest honour conferred by the Sangeet Natak Akademi, India's National Academy of Music, Dance & Drama. This was followed by the Padma Bhushan in 1984, given by the Government of India.
