= Pannalal Ghosh =

Indian flute player and composer (1911-1960)

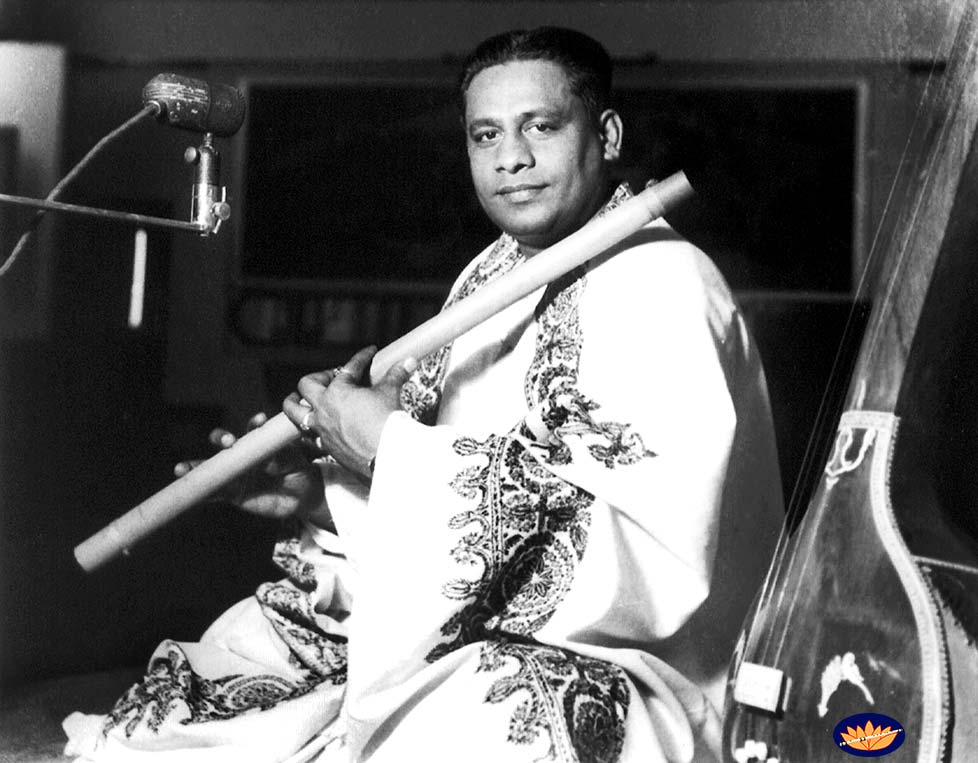
- Ghosh performing at All India Radio

Background information
- Born: Amaljyoti Ghosh; 24 July 1911; Barisal, Bengal Presidency, British India (now in Bangladesh)
- Died: 20 April 1960 (aged 48) New Delhi, India
- Genres: Hindustani classical music, film score
- Occupations: Flutist, composer
- Instrument: Bansuri
- Formerly of: Ustad Ali Akbar Khan, Ravi Shankar, Allauddin Khan

Pannalal Ghosh ( 24 July 1911 – 20 April 1960), also known as Amal Jyoti Ghosh, was an Indian flute (bansuri) player and composer. He was a disciple of Allauddin Khan, and is credited with popularising the flute as a concert instrument in Hindustani classical music and is considered a pioneer of Indian classical flute.

== Early life ==
Pannalal Ghosh was born on 24 July 1911 in Barisal, Bengal Presidency, British India. He was named Amal Jyoti Ghosh with Pannalal having been his nickname. His father, Akshay Kumar Ghosh, was a sitarist. Ghosh received his initial training in music from his father, learning to play the sitar. Two apocryphal incidents in his childhood are believed to have influenced Ghosh in taking up the flute. As a child he had picked up a small flute that cowherds usually played, and on the basis of the education he was receiving on the sitar from his father, he would try to play musical patterns on the flute. The family's ancestral house was on the banks of the Kirtankhola river. At the age of nine, while swimming in the river one day, Ghosh found a long bamboo stick that was half-flute and half walking stick. The flute part of the stick was longer than a traditional flute and Ghosh started practising on it. Then at the age of eleven, Ghosh is said to have met a holy man who held a conch and a flute and asked if he could play the flute. When Ghosh obliged, the man blessed him and said that music would be his salvation.

He was married to Parul Ghosh (née Biswas) in 1924 when she was only nine and he was thirteen years old. She was the younger sister of Ghosh's friend Anil Biswas who went on to become a celebrated music composer. Parul was a talented singer herself and later became a well-known playback singer. In 1928, Ghosh became a part of the Indian Independence Movement. He joined a gymnasium and learnt martial arts, boxing and stick fighting. As he became more involved in the independence movement, the government started keeping a close watch. Consequently, he shifted to Calcutta at the age of seventeen in search of a livelihood. At the age of eighteen, he started focusing his attention on the flute. Ghosh realised that a bigger flute's pitch and sonority would be more appropriate for both classical and light music. Ghosh experimented with various materials including metal and different types of wood, and decided on using bamboo. He finally settled on a flute which was thirty two inches long.

At Kolkata during the early 1930s, Pannalal received musical training for two years from his first Guru, the noted harmonium player and a renowned master in classical music, Ustad Khushi Mohammed Khan, under the traditional Ganda Bandhan form of tutelage. After the sad demise of Khushi Mohammed Khan, Pannalal studied under Pt. Girija Shankar Chakraborty, an eminent musician and musicologist. The strongest influence on his music came from the systematic lessons under the legendary Ustad Allaudin Khan Sahib, from 1947.

Panna Lal Ghosh's daughter Shanti-Sudha was married to the flute player Devendra Murdeshwar, who was her father's disciple. Their son Anand Murdeshwar, Panna Lal's grandson, also made a name as flute player but died at a very young age. Ghosh's younger brother, Nikhil Ghosh, was a noted Tabla player and Padma Bhushan awardee.

== Career ==
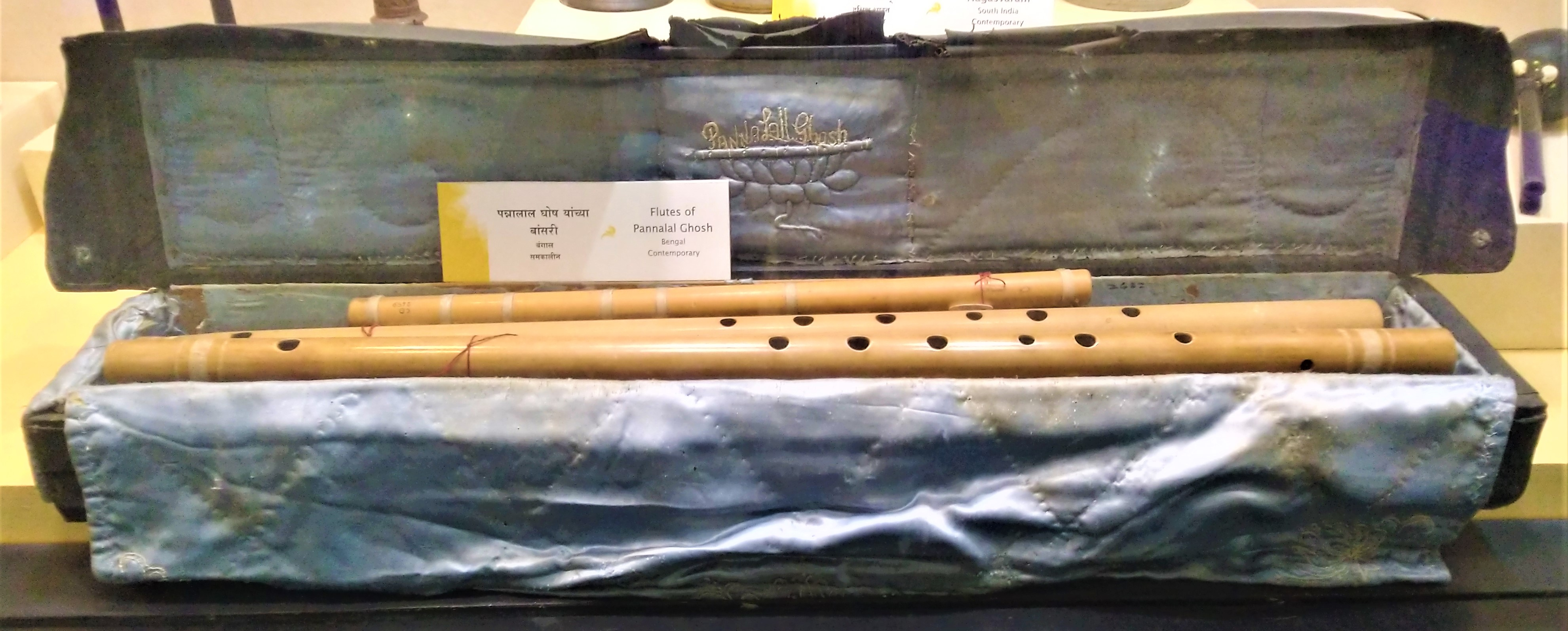
Flutes of Ghosh kept in a bag with his name embroidered on the top flap. Collection of Raja Dinkar Kelkar Museum, Pune.

Having assisted in music production while he was in Calcutta working with New Theatres Ltd. In 1940 he came to Bombay to further expand his music career. Sneh Bandhan (1940) was his debut film as an independent music composer. The popular songs from the film were "Aabroo Ke Kamaanon Mein" and "Sneh Bandhan Mein Bandhe Hue" sung by Khan Mastan and Bibbo. Pannalal Ghosh jointly scored the background for "Aandhiyan" in 1952 along with Ustad Ali Akbar Khan and Pandit Ravi Shankar. He was the first to introduce the seven-hole flute.

=== Innovations ===
Pannalal Ghosh incorporated what is known as the Teevra-Madhyam Hole which is also known as the Dhruva-Madhyam hole, placed off the centre-line of fingering holes, at the bottom of the flute. Veteran flautist Nityanand Haldipur who is his direct disciple explains that this hole was designed specifically to play the Teevra-Madhyam (‘Ma' or 4th note) of the lower octave especially in Raagas such as Puriya, Darbari and Bihag where a Madhyam to Pancham meend (glide) is required. It can even give the kharaj ka gandhar (3rd note ‘Ga' of the lower octave) too. The hold too was changed by the late legend to enable the little finger to reach this hole. For Raagas such as Darbari where the lower octave (Mandra Saptak) is explored in detail, Pannalal Ghosh invented another bass flute with just 4 holes which was almost 40-42 inches long. This additional hole makes the Indian flute playable almost exactly like the Western recorder, which only has another additional rear hole, placed above towards the mouthpiece, that remains closely held by the left thumb. The long bamboo flutes he devised are popularly played by subsequent flautists to render Hindusthani classical music.

== Notable students ==
- Devendra Murdeshwar
- V.G. Karnad
- Nityanand Haldipur
