= Nikhil Ghosh =

Indian musician, teacher, and writer (1918–1995)

- Born: 28 December 1918; Barisal, East Bengal, British India
- Died: 3 March 1995 (aged 76); India
- Occupations: Musician music teacher author
- Known for: Tabla
- Children: 3, including Nayan Ghosh, Dhruba Ghosh and Tulika Ghosh
- Awards: Padma Bhushan; Ustad Hafiz Ali Khan Award

Nikhil Jyoti Ghosh (28 December 1918 – 3 March 1995) was an Indian musician, teacher and writer, known for his proficiency in the percussion instrument of tabla.

He founded Sangit Mahabharati, an institution of music in 1956, and performed on various stages in India and abroad. A recipient of the Ustad Hafiz Ali Khan Award, his style was known to have been aligned with the Delhi, Ajrada, Farukhabad, Lucknow and Punjab gharanas of music. The Government of India awarded him the third highest civilian honour of the Padma Bhushan, in 1990, for his contributions to Music.

== Biography ==
Nikhil Ghosh was born on 28 December 1918 in the small village of Barisal, in East Bengal (present-day Bangladesh) of British India as the younger brother of Pannalal Ghosh, a known flautist of Hindustani classical music. After early training in music from his father, Akshay Kumar Ghosh, who was a locally known sitarist, he trained in vocals and tabla under several noted musicians such as Ahmed Jan Thirakwa, Amir Hussain Khan and Jnan Prakash Ghosh, and started performing on stage accompanying some of the notable musicians of his time, which included Faiyaz Khan, Hafiz Ali Khan, Allauddin Khan, Omkarnath Thakur, Bade Ghulam Ali Khan, Amir Khan, Pannalal Ghosh, Ravi Shankar, Ali Akbar Khan, Vilayat Khan, Bhimsen Joshi, Nikhil Banerjee, Vasant Rai, Jasraj, Amjad Ali Khan and Shiv Kumar Sharma.

Ghosh founded Sangit Mahabharati, a school dedicated for classical music education in 1956. Here, he tutored several aspiring musicians, some of which have already made their names in Indian classical music; Aneesh Pradhan, Eknath Pimpale, Datta Yande, Karodilal Bhatt, Gert Wegner and Keith Manning are some of the notable ones among them. He also trained his sons, Nayan Ghosh and Dhruba Ghosh on Tabla and Sarangi respectively as well as his daughter, Tulika Ghosh, on vocals. all of them assist him in teaching at the school.

Ghosh performed on many stages in India and abroad and performed solo at music festivals of Aldeburgh (1958), Edinburgh (1958), Bratislava (1980, 1982), Helsinki (1985), Rome (1985), Athens (1985) and at UNESCO, Paris in 1978. He also served as a visiting faculty of music at many universities. He made improvements in the conventional music notation system and wrote a book detailing his system under the title, Fundamentals of Raga and Tala: With a New System of Notation. Later, he also supplemented the book with another Manuscript Book for easy notation. This was followed by the seminal work, The Oxford Encyclopaedia of the Music of India, with author credit going to his music school, Sangit Mahabharati.

The Government of India awarded him the civilian honour of the Padma Bhushan in 1990 and he received the Ustad Hafiz Ali Khan Award in 1995. He was married to Usha Nayampally, the marriage taking place in 1955. He died on 3 March 1995, at the age of 76, survived by his wife and three children.

== See also ==
- Nayan Ghosh
- Pannalal Ghosh
- Jnan Prakash Ghosh
- Ahmed Jan Thirakwa
