= Ahmed Jan Thirakwa =

Indian tabla player (1892–1976)

- Born: Ahmed Jan; 1892; Moradabad, North-Western Provinces, British India
- Died: 13 January 1976 (aged 84–85); Lucknow, Uttar Pradesh
- Occupation: tabla player
- Years active: 1908–1976
- Known for: Hindustani classical music
- Awards: Padma Bhushan Award by the Government of India (1970) *Sangeet Natak Akademi Award (1954)

Ustad Ahmed Jan Khan "Thirakwa" (1892 – 13 January 1976) was an Indian tabla player, commonly considered the pre-eminent soloist among tabla players of the 20th century, and among the most influential percussionists in the history of Indian Classical Music.

He was known for his mastery of the finger techniques and aesthetic values of various tabla styles. He received the Sangeet Natak Akademi Award for tabla in 1954 and the Padma Bhushan Award for Arts in 1970.

== Early life and career ==
Ahmed Jan later known as 'Ahmed Jan Thirakwa' was born to a family of musicians in 1892 in Moradabad in the North-Western Provinces of British India. Although his early musical training was in Hindustani vocals and the sarangi, his interest in tabla was aroused when he first heard tabla player Munir Khan. He became Munir Khan's disciple at the age of 12. According to The Hindu newspaper article, "When he was around 12, Ahmed Jan was brought to Bombay by his father Hussain Bakhsh and elder brother Mia Jan, both of whom were noted sarangi players, and placed in the hands of the tabla stalwart Ustad Munir Khan. The tutelage was to last for 25 years but at a very early stage, his guru's father, Kale Khan, nicknamed him "Thirakwa" because of his playful and naughty nature."

For a long time, he played tabla in the court of the Nawab of Rampur and during this time, came in close contact with the maestroes of Agra, Jaipur, Gwalior and Patiala gharanas — both vocalists and instrumentalists. On very few occasions, he rendered Bandishes in his own voice but this was only in the company of extremely close compatriots and admirers. As an accompanist, he was equally loved, respected and admired by his peers and elders. Two noteworthy artists in this category of admirers were the great Rabindrasangeet exponent Suchitra Mitra (1924–2011) and the famous tabla player Pandit Nikhil Ghosh.

The name "Thirakwa" is not actually his original name, but was a nickname he earned from his guru's father. One day, while watching him practise, his guru's father remarked that he played so well his fingers seemed to be "shimmering" on the tabla. This earned him the nickname Thirakwa (shimmering).

It is also rumored that his tone was similar to the thunderous cracking sound of lightning. A great lightning is sometimes described as "Thirakwa". In popular jargon, Ahmad Jan Thirakwa is termed as the "Mount Everest of Tabla". He performed at regular intervals in almost all the music conferences in various parts of the country and gained popularity as well as admiration. A connoisseur of biryani and kababs, Ahmad Jan was famous for his interpretation of the wide-ranging patterns of the beat-cycles which he liberally taught to his disciples. He made history by playing the tabla as a solo instrument at a time when it was only used and accepted as an accompanist. A few number of his live recordings are now available in audio-visual form that include excerpts from his different programmes over the years and which also provide glimpses of his mastery over percussion. He was the tabla player on the famous 'jugulbandi' (duet) of Bismillah Khan and Vilayat Khan. According to The Hindu newspaper article on Ahmed Jan Thirakwa, "Ustad Thirakwa, for instance, was revered both as a soloist and as an accompanist. He belongs to the glittering galaxy of Hindustani classical music along with other supernovae such as Aftab-e-Mausiqui ('Sun of Music') Faiyaz Khan, Abdul Karim Khan, Allabande Khan, Alladiya Khan, Allauddin Khan and Bade Ghulam Ali Khan."

== Disciples ==
Ustad Ahmed Jan Thirakwa, during his long career as a musician, trained many disciples all across India including Pandit Prem Vallabh ji, Pandit Lalji Gokhale, Pandit Nikhil Ghosh (tabla player) and famous vocalist of Agra gharana Pandit Jagannathbuwa Purohit, Pandit Narayanrao Joshi, Pandit Bhai Gaitonde, Pandit Bapu Patwardhan, Shri Anand Shidhaye, Dr. Dhananjay Patkie and Rashid Mustafa Thirakwa are some of his well-known shagirds (disciples). Ustad Ahmed Jan's unique style continues to attract many tabla players of present generation including Ustad Zakir Hussain, Pandit Chandra Nath Shastri, Pandit Anindo Chatterjee and Pandit Nikhil Ghosh.

== Awards and recognition ==
- Sangeet Natak Akademi Award for tabla in 1954
- Padma Bhushan Award for Arts in 1970

== Death and legacy ==
Ahmed Jan Thirakwa died on 13 January 1976 at Lucknow, India at age 84.

As of 2015, an 'Ustad Ahmed Jan Thirakwa Music Festival' is held every year to pay tribute to him by music enthusiasts in many major cities of India – Delhi, Pune, Mumbai, Kolhapur.

== See also ==
- Pandit Anokhelal Mishra
- Pandit Kishan Maharaj
- Pandit Samta Prasad
- Ustad Alla Rakha
- Ustad Zakir Hussain
