= Darbar Festival =

Indian classical music festival

- Darbar logo
- Genre: Indian classical music
- Dates: September to November
- Location: London
- Years active: 2005–present
- Founders: Sandeep Virdee
- Website: darbar.org

The Darbar Festival is an Indian classical music festival based in London that annually features Hindustani classical music and Carnatic music and featured Indian classical dance in 2017. The festival was founded in 2005 in Leicester as a tribute to tabla teacher Gurmit Singh Virdee by his son Sandeep Virdee. The Hindu described it as "probably the biggest festival of classical music outside India".

== History ==
In 2005, after the sudden passing of tabla player and teacher Gurmit Singh Virdee (1937–2005), his son, Sandeep Virdee, hosted a tabla tribute concert in Leicester in honor of his father. The success of this event led to the creation of the Darbar Festival. In 2007, the charity, Darbar Arts Culture Heritage Trust, was created.

== List of festivals ==
- 2006 Peepul Centre: Ronu Majumdar, Nina Burmi, Ajoy Chakrabarty
- 2007 Phoenix Square: Harjinderpal Singh Matharu, Prem Kumar Mallick, Rimpa Siva, Mysore A. Chandan, Vishwa Mohan Bhatt, Surdarshan Chana, S. Harikumar, Shahid Parvez, Jyotsna Srikanth, Ken Zuckerman, Sanju Sahai, Ravi Shankar Upadhyay, Parveen Sultana
- 2008 Phoenix Square: Tarun Jasani, Sanjay Subrahmanyan, Irshad Khan, Bhupinder Chaggar, Kaviraj Singh Dhadyalla, Shashwati Mandal
- 2009 Southbank Centre: Harmeet Virdee, Rahul Sharma, Somjit Dasgupta, Aruna Sairam, Ashwini Bhide-Deshpande, Ganesh and Kumaresh, Carnatic Ensemble, Tejendra Majumdar, Shashank Subramanyam, Purbayan Chatterjee, Rupak Kulkarni, Wasifuddin Dagar
- 2010 Kings Place: Veena Sahasrabuddhe, Patricia Rozario, Satyajit Talwalkar, Jyotsna Srikanth, Rajhesh Vaidhya, Kushal Das, Murad Ali Khan, Venkatesh Kumar, Shivkumar Sharma
- 2011 Kings Place: Tarang Ensemble, Madras String Quartet, Alam Khan, Sameehan Kashalkar, P. Unnikrishnan, Arati Ankalikar Tikekar, Suresh Talwalkar, Gurdain Rayatt, Purbayan Chatterjee, Kadri Gopalnath, Uday Bhawalkar, Roopa Panesar, Ulhas Kashalkar
- 2012 Southbank Centre: Joydeep Ghosh, Mysore Brothers, Chitrangana Agle-Reshwal, Rajendra Prasanna, Manjiri Asanare–Kelkar, Pushparaj Koshti, Swapan Chaudhuri, N. Ravikiran, Shruti Sadolikar, Shujaat Khan, Prattyush Banerjee, UK Carnatic ensemble, Ram Deshpande
- 2013 Southbank Centre: Bernhard Schimpelsberger, Sukhad Munde, Jayanthi Kumaresh, Debashish Bhattacharya, Nirmalya Dey, Wajahat Khan, Manjusha Kulkarni-Patil, Harjinderpal Singh Matharu, Anupama Bhagwat, Sudha Ragunathan, Budhaditya Mukherjee, Yogesh Samsi, Bahauddin Dagar, Raghunandan Panshikar
- 2014 Southbank Centre: Bharat Bhushan Goswami, Debashish Bhattacharya, Nityanand Haldipur, Prem Kumar Mallick, Prashant Mallick, Vinayak Torvi, Subhankar Banerjee, Jyoti Hegde, Abhishek Raghuram, Shashank Subramanyam, Niladri Kumar, Prabha Atre
- 2015 Southbank Centre: D. Srinivas, Satyajit Talwalkar, Abhisek Lahiri, Ranjani–Gayatri, Ronu Majumdar, Pelva Naik, Mita Nag, Jayateerth Mevundi, Bahauddin Dagar, Irshad Khan, Kaushiki Chakraborty, Shivkumar Sharma, Seeta Patel
- 2016 Southbank Centre: Rakesh Chaurasia, Niladri Kumar, Roopa Panesar, Aruna Sairam, Jayanthi Kumaresh, Rajan and Sajan Mishra, Vishal Jain, Shubha Mudgal, Amjad Ali Khan
- 2017 Sadler's Wells Theatre: Akram Khan, Patri Satish Kumar, Pravin Godkhindi, Mythili Prakash, Debasmita Bhattacharya, Dheerendra Tiwari, Indrani Mukherjee, Ram Kumar Mallick, Samit Mallick, Arshad Khan, Mavin Khoo, Sahana Banerjee, Aditi Mangaldas, Surdarshan Chana, Supreet Deshpande, Kaivalya Kumar Gurav, Nishat Khan, Seeta Patel
- 2018 Barbican Centre: Rupak Kulkarni, Meeta Pandit, Soumik Datta, Malladi Brothers, Wasifuddin Dagar, Sanju Sahai, G. J. R. Krishnan, Lalgudi Vijayalakshmi, Omkar Dadarkar, Shahid Parvez, Parveen Sultana
- 2019 Barbican Centre: Parimal Chakraborty, Gurdain Rayatt, Kaushik Konwar, Kala Ramnath, Abhishek Borkar, Praashekh Borkar, Sudha Ragunathan, Gundecha Brothers, Sabir Khan, Momin Khan, Manjiri Asanare-Kelkar, J. A. Jayant, Budhaditya Mukherjee, Shivkumar Sharma
- 2021 Barbican Centre: Jyotsna Srikanth, Ken Zuckerman, Roopa Panesar, Sukhvinder Singh, Waseem Khan, Kushal Das, Kaushiki Chakraborty
- 2022 Barbican Centre: Ramana Balachandran, Sabir Khan, Sanskrati Wahane, Prakrati Wahane, Satyajit Talwalkar, Uday Bhawalkar, Eeshar Singh, Rajrupa Chowdhury, Bharathi Prathap, Purbayan Chatterjee, Rakesh Chaurasia, Shubha Mudgal
- 2023 Barbican Centre: Ayan Sengupta, Pratik Shrivastav, Tari Khan, Sarwar Hussain Khan, Jyoti Hegde, Alam Khan, Ranjani–Gayatri, Pravin Godkhindi, Shashank Subramanyam, Anupama Bhagwat, Ulhas Kashalkar
- 2024 Barbican Centre: Dilshad Khan, Jayanthi Kumaresh, Anindo Chatterjee, Anubrata Chatterjee, Jasdeep Singh Degun, Shalmalee Joshi, Amaan Ali Bangash, L. Subramaniam, Ambi Subramaniam, Aruna Sairam, Kushal Das, Ashwini Bhide-Deshpande
- 2025 Barbican Centre: Debasmita Bhattacharya, Prem Kumar Mallick, Prashant Mallick, Akkarai Sisters, Ruchira Kedar, Yashwant Vaishnav, Vivek Pandya, Amaan Hussain, Sriranjani Santhanagopalan, Rahul Sharma, Yogesh Samsi, Patri Satish Kumar, Giridhar Udupa, T. M. Krishna, Tanmay Deochake, Rakesh Chaurasia, Shahid Parvez, Shakir Khan
- 2026 Barbican Centre: Jasdeep Singh Degun, Debanjan Bhattacharjee, Spoorthi Rao, Wasifuddin Dagar, Sunanda Sharma, Shahbaz Hussain, Irshad Khan, Prasad Khaparde, Kala Ramnath, Jayanthi Kumaresh, Sandeep Narayan, Amaan Ali Bangash, Ayaan Ali Bangash
