= S. J. Jananiy =

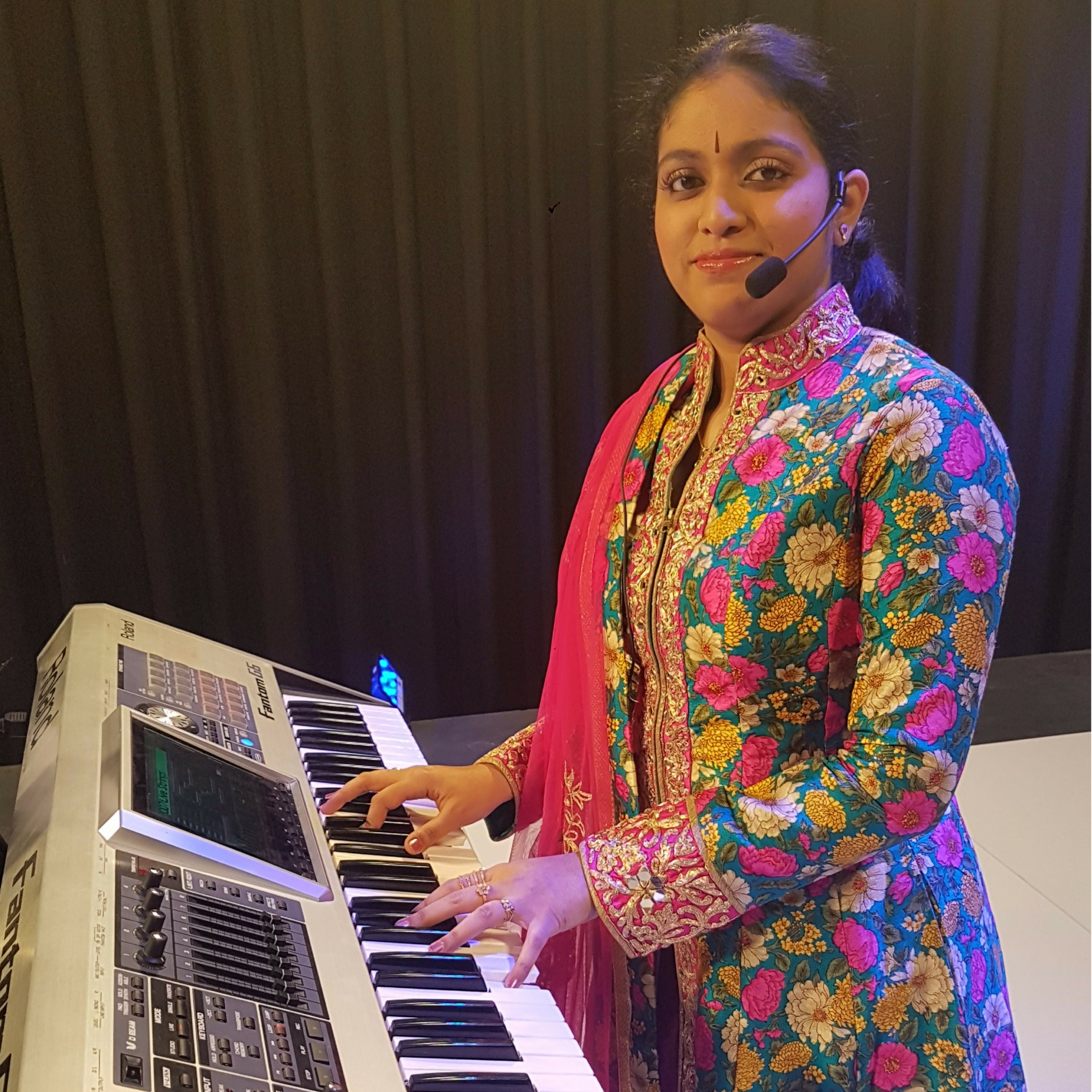

Background information
- Also known as: Cuddalore Janani; S. J. Janani
- Born: Subramanian Jaya Jananiy; 10 December; Tirunelveli, Tamil Nadu, India
- Origin: Cuddalore, Tamil Nadu, India
- Genres: Film score, Carnatic classical, Hindustani, Western Classical, Devotional, Bhajan, Pop, Electronic
- Occupations: Musician, Composer, Music Director, Performer, Singer-Songwriter, music programmer/producer, record producer, keyboardist, pianist, carnatic keyboardist
- Instruments: Keyboard; Piano
- Years active: 1996–present
- Label: JSJ Audio
- Website: Official website

Subramanian Jaya Jananiy, also known as Cuddalore Janani and S. J. Janani, is a Film Composer, Singer-Songwriter, Carnatic Vocaslist, Playback Singer, Hindustani & Western Classical Vocalist, Music Producer, Record Producer, Multifaceted Musician, Multi-Instrumentalist & Film Score composer based in Chennai, Tamil Nadu. She was bestowed with National Child Award for Exceptional Achievement in 2001 by Government of India. Jananiy is honoured with the prestigious Kalaimamani Award by the Government of Tamilnadu for the year 2018. Earlier, she was also awarded with Kalai Ilamani Award in 2003 by Government of Tamil Nadu. Jananiy is trained in Carnatic classical music, Hindustani classical music and Western Classical Music. She is also a keyboardist and pianist and plays violin, veena and guitar for studio recording. Jananiy is an A Grade Artiste at All India Radio.

Jananiy is a GRAMMY Voting Member and a member of the Producer & Engineer Wing of the Recording Academy.

Jananiy set a record in the Asia Book of Records and the India Book of Records for the title "Maximum Music Credits Held by an Individual in a Tamil Feature Film (RAIL)," by holding 10 distinct music credits in the Tamil feature film Rail.

== Early life and education ==
Jananiy was born in Tirunelveli, Tamil Nadu, to Shanti and V. Subramanian. She completed her education up to ninth grade at St. Mary's Matriculation Higher Secondary School, Cuddalore where she was awarded with Best Vocalist Award each year. While at St. Mary's Matriculation, Jananiy was also nominated for Pogo Amazing Kid Award conducted by Pogo TV at the national level in music category. In 2006, her family relocated to Chennai where she completed her matriculation from Adarsh Vidyalaya Higher Secondary School. She received her Higher Secondary degree from Sacred Heart Matriculation Higher Sec. School with distinction in Tamil.

In 2009, Jananiy entered Stella Maris College, Chennai where she graduated in Economics in 2012. She received her Master of Arts and Master of Philosophy degrees in Music from Queen Mary's College, Chennai. As of 2017, Jananiy was doing PhD in Music from Queen Mary's College.

== Music style and influence ==
Jananiy has been a disciple of a prominent Carnatic vocalist, Mangalampalli Balamuralikrishna. She also got trained under Neyveli Santhanagopalan, Injikudi Ganesan, Rukmini Ramani, Chidambaram Shanmukham, Geetha Srinivasan & Guru Lakshmi. Jananiy has completed Grade 8 in keyboard as well as Grade 8 in Vocal from Trinity College London, under Augustine Paul and V. Giridharan. She continued ATCL in Western Classical Vocal at Trinity College London. Jananiy learnt Hindustani classical music under the discipleship of Pandit Kuldeep Sagar and completed Senior Diploma from Prayag Sangeet Samiti, Allahabad.

== Career ==
Jananiy started her career at age of 5 by performing in her first stage show in Cuddalore. Over the years, Jananiy has performed in more than 1000 stage shows of Carnatic Classical Vocal, Fusion, Bhajan, Devotional and Light Music and also gave more than 100 Carnatic Classical keyboard concerts. At age of 8, she was recognized as Saadhanai Naayaki (achiever) by Tamil language weekly magazine, Ananda Vikatan. Dinamani, a Tamil daily newspaper, named her Eazhu vayadhu Isai kuyil (seven years old cuckoo) and Vairamuthu, a prominent Tamil poet and lyricist titled her Nee En Magal (my daughter from then) in an interview to a Tamil weekly Kumudam.

Jananiy's debut album, Natha Oli, was released in 1999. Natha Oli was fusion of Carnatic Classical Vocal and keyboard. The music director of the album was Kumardeva and it was released by JSJ Audio. After the release of her first album, she regularly participated in the Thiruvaiyyaru Thyagabrahma Utsavam and performed at Thiruvaiyaru Tamil Isai Mandram. Jananiy also performed at Kodai Vizha Festival organized by Government of Tamil Nadu.

In 2001, Jananiy was awarded with National Child Award for Exceptional Achievement in the field of Classical Music (vocal), by then Vice-President of India, Krishan Kant. In 2002, her second album Poongatru was released in collaboration with S. P. Balasubrahmanyam. L. Vaidyanathan directed the music and lyrics were written by Kaviperarasu Vairamuthu.

On 14 November 2002, Jananiy participated in Children's Day Function at Rashtrapati Bhavan, New Delhi and performed Endaro Mahanubhavulu for A. P. J. Abdul Kalam, then President of India. In 2003, Jananiy was bestowed with Kalai Ilamani Award from Government of Tamil Nadu for her excellence in classical music. The same year, she did playback singing under the direction of Karthik Raja, for a Tamil film, Album.

In 2007, Jananiy's third album, Sri Venkatesa Suprabhatam & Kandha Sashti Kavacham, was released. The album was collection of devotional songs with Carnatic music. The album was released by M. Balamuralikrishna and Neyveli Santhanagopalan. After release of the album, Jananiy became disciple of Balamuralikrishna.

In 2007, Jananiy collaborated with her uncle and released the concept-series Classic Waves. The music for this series was conducted, arranged and produced by Jananiy herself. Classic Waves 2 and 3 were released in 2010 and 2011 respectively while 4 volumes of Classic Marvel series were released in 2009, 2010, 2011 and 2012 respectively. Jananiy received Yuvakala Bharathi from Bharat Kalachar in 2011. Later in 2011, Jananiy participated with Pandit Hariprasad Chaurasia in a Jugalbandi concert for the Music festival Au Fil des Voix at Alhambra Concert Hall in Paris, France.

In 2012, Jananiy composed and produced music for S. P. Balasubrahmanyam's contemporary album, Kandar Shashti Kavacham and Subrahmanya Bhujangam. The album was released by EMI Virgin. Later in December that year, Jananiy collaborated again with Balasubrahmanyam along with Hariharan and P. Unnikrishnan for Mahakavi Bharathiar's Vande Mataram. She was also the composer, arranger and conductor of music for this album.

Jananiy made the musical arrangements and produced music for Carnatic Symphony-Cleveland Thyagaraja Aradhana Festival that was held in Cleveland, Ohio, in 2014 as well as in 2017. She was awarded with Sangitha Kovidha from Gayathri Fine Arts & Lakshmi Kuppuswamy Trust, New Delhi in 2015. She also received Bharathi Award from Vidiyal Charitable Trust & The Dawn Cultural & Social Association later that year. Jananiy composed music for the Tamil Movie Prabha that got launched in 2015. As of 2024, she has released 90 albums in various genres apart from jingles and private songs.

S. J. Jananiy has scored the music and five original soundtracks for the Indian Tamil Feature Film Rail that was released on 21 June 2024.

This Movie was directed by the award-winning Bhaskar Sakthi, and this movie is based on the South Indian Nativity-based story. S. J. Jananiy has collaborated with the Bulgarian National Radio Symphony Orchestra to record the Strings Ensemble for the soundtracks and for the background score for this Movie. The five soundtracks are in five various genres such as a Tamil folklore melody, an Indian Classical melody, an emotional philosophical song that is sung by “Thenisai Thendral” Deva (composer) who is an iconic Music Director and Singer, a folk-based philosophical peppy song that is sung by Anthony Daasan. Jananiy has sung three songs. The Oppaari Song (a folk song that is performed during the death ceremony) in Strings Ensemble is a highlighting song of the Movie. The cameraman for this Movie is Theni Eswar, and the Editor is Nagooran Ramachandran. Rameshvaidya has phenomenally written the lyrics for the five soundtracks. This beautiful message conveying Rail Movie is produced by M.Vediyappan of Discovery Cinemas.

== Awards and recognition ==
- National Child Award for Exceptional Achievement from Vice-President of India, Krishan Kant (2001)
- Pannisaiselvi from Tamil Isai Mandram, Thiruvaiyaru on (2002)
- Best Achiever from Manitha Urimai Kazhagam by N. Rangaswamy, Chief Minister of Pondicherry (2002)
- Kalai Ilamani from Government of Tamil Nadu (2003)
- Bala Arul Isai Vaani from EKP School of Arts, Mayavaram (2003)
- Sundara Varshani from Aalala Sundara Sabha, Cuddalore (2003)
- Thenisai Vaani from Vani Vilasa Sabha, Kumbakonam (2004)
- Pogo Amazing Kid from Pogo TV (2005)
- Vocational Service Award from Rotary Club of Cuddalore Central on (2007)
- Young Achiever Award from Rotary Club of Madras Northwest (2007)
- Bala Swarna Jwala Award from Journal of School Social Work, Chennai (2007)
- Rising Star – Idea Jalsa National Award from Indian Music Academy (2009)
- Vidivelli Achiever Award from Lions Club of Madras Peripheral City (2009)
- Yuvakala Bharati from Bharath Kalachar (2011)

- Cuddalore Isaikuyil from Saraswathi Gana Sabha, Cuddalore (2009)
- Isai Vaani from Jaya Educational Trust, Thirunindravur (2010)
- Best Artist Award – Classical Music from Stella Maris College, Chennai (2012)
- Maharajapuram Santhanam Endowment Prize from Sri Krishna Gana Sabha (2012)
- Best Junior Vocalist Award from Thyaga Brahma Gana Sabha, Vani Mahal (2013)
- Tamizhisai Kalaimani from Mahakavi Bharathi Narpani Mandram (2014)
- OSA Prize for MA Indian Music from Queen Mary's College, Chennai (2014)
- Smt.Chandra Kuppuraj Memorial Prize for MA Indian Music from Queen Mary's College, Chennai (2014)
- Union Prize for MA Indian Music from Queen Mary's College, Chennai (2014)
- Voletti Venkateswaralu Endowment Prize from Sri Krishna Gana Sabha (2014)
- Sanghitha Kovidha from Gayathri Fine Arts & Lakshmi Kuppuswamy Trust, New Delhi (2015)
- Bharathi Award from Vidiyal Charitable Trust & The Dawn Cultural & Social Association, Chennai (2015)
- 1st Rank – MA Indian Music" & "Best Student in rendering Raga Hindolam from Queen Mary's College, Chennai (2015)
- Isai Arasi from Trinity Arts Festival of India (2015)

== Discography ==
Album	Year	Notes
Naatha Oli	1999	Music by Kumar Deva
Poongatru with S. P. Balasubrahmanyam	2002	Music by L. Vaidyanathan
Sri Venkatesa Suprabhatam & Kandha Sashti Kavacham	2007	Released by M. Balamuralikrishna and Neyveli Santhanagopalan
Classic Waves Fusion Album	2007	Released by Kaviperarasu Vairamuthu and Kalaipuli Thanu. Music by Jananiy-Sanker
Pancharatna Krithis of St. Thiyagaraja	2008	Carnatic Classical Instrumental - Keyboard
Ohm Namashivaya Shivaya Nama ohm	2008	Devotional
Classic Marvel hits of St. Thiyagaraja	2009	Carnatic Classical Vocal
Classic Hits in Keyboard	2009	Released by M. Balamuralikrishna Carnatic Classical Instrumental - Keyboard
Classic Waves-2 Silambosai	2010	Fusion Music & Sung by S. J. Jananiy, Released by Kaviperarasu Vairamuthu
Classic Marvel-2 Hits of Dr. M. Balamuralikrishna	2010	Released by S. Ve. Shekher and P. Unnikrishnan
Classic Waves-3	2011	Fusion Music & sung by S. J. Jananiy, Released by S. Parthiban and S.Mehanathan
Classic Marvel-3 Hits of Muthuswami Dhikshitar	2011	Carnatic Classical Vocal
Classic Marvel-4 Hits of Shyama Sastri	2012	Carnatic Classical Vocal
Kannan Hits in Keyboard	2012	–
Trinity's Evergreen 1	2012	–
Sri Khandar Shasthi Kavacham & Sri Subramanya Bhujangam	2012	Sung by S. P. Balasubrahmanyam, Music by S. J. Jananiy
Mahakavi Bharathiar's Vande Mataram	2012	Music by S.J. Jananiy. Sung with S. P. Balasubrahmanyam, Hariharan, P. Unnikrishnan. Released by Kaviperarasu Vairamuthu, Kalaipuli Thanu, La Ganesan and S.Mehanathan.
Trinity's Evergreen 2	2013	–
Trinity's Evergreen 3	2015	–
Prabha (Tamil movie)	2015	Singers – M. Balamuralikrishna, Hariharan, Palakkad Sreeram, Vijay Prakash, Swetha Mohan, S. J. Jananiy. Music by S. J. Jananiy
Carnatic Fusion – Hits of S. J. Jananiy	2015	–
Navadurgas – Live Concert 2015 Vol 1	2015	Krithis Composed & Sung by S. J. Jananiy - Carnatic Classical Vocal
Navadurgas – Live Concert 2015 Vol 2	2015	Krithis Composed & Sung by S. J. Jananiy - Carnatic Classical Vocal
Carnatic Classical Vocal – Best of S. J. Jananiy	2016	–
Carnatic Classical Instrumental – Best of S. J. Jananiy	2016	–
Shivamahimai Brahmakumaris	2017	Singers – P. Unnikrishnan and S. J. Jananiy. Music by S. J. Jananiy
Uravugale Oru Kaaval – Friendship Song – Single	2017	Pop - Music and singer – S. J. Jananiy
Yaronse Kar Yarana – Friendship Song – Single	2017	Pop - Music and singer – S. J. Jananiy
Devi Krithis, Vol 1	2017	
Devi Krithis, Vol 2	2017	
Adhu Nilavu - The Moon - Indian Pop	2018	Music & Singer S. J. Jananiy
Rail	2024	Feature film
