= Sriranjani (disambiguation) =

Sriranjani is a ragam in Carnatic music (musical scale of South Indian classical music).

It may also refer to:

- Sriranjani Sr. (1906–1939), Indian actress in Telugu theater and cinema
- Sriranjani Jr. (1927–1974), Indian actress in Telugu and Tamil cinema, younger sister of the above
- Sriranjani (Tamil actress), Indian actress, a supporting actress in 2000s Tamil cinema
- Sriranjani Santhanagopalan, Indian classical singer

== See also ==
- Ranjani (disambiguation)
