= Anubrata Chatterjee =

Indian musician (born 1985)

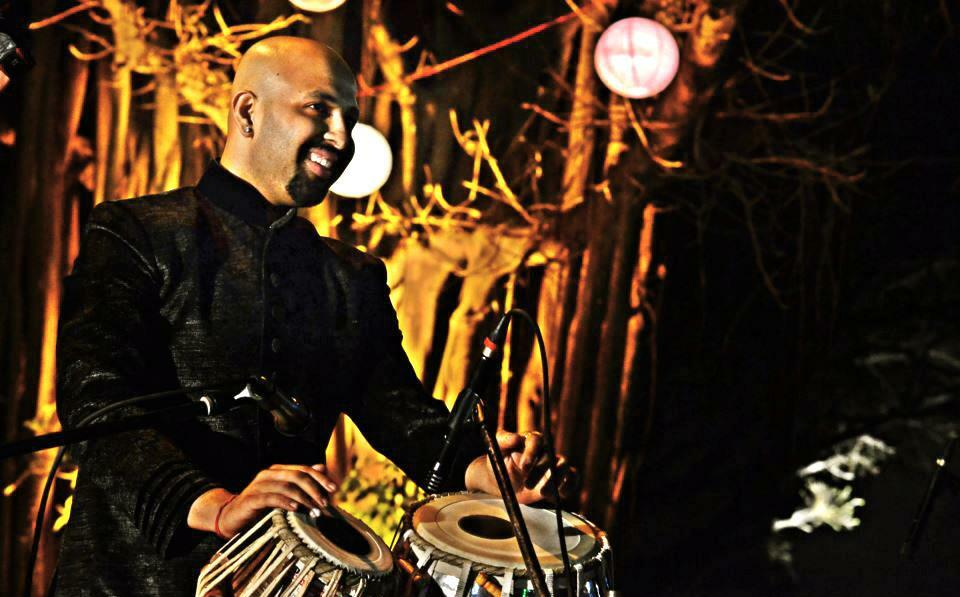
- Anubrata Chatterjee performing at a concert, 2014

Background information
- Born: 1 June 1985 (age 41); Kolkata, India
- Origin: Mumbai, India
- Genres: Hindustani classical music, jazz fusion
- Occupation: Musical artist
- Instrument: Tabla
- Years active: (1991–present)

Anubrata Chatterjee (born 1 June 1985) is an Indian tabla (hand drums) player of the Farrukhabad gharana of Hindustani classical music. He is the son of tabla player Anindo Chatterjee.

== Career ==
He debuted alongside Hariprasad Chaurasia, and subsequently collaborated with other musicians in the Indian classical music realm, such as Amjad Ali Khan, Birju Maharaj, Shivkumar Sharma, Shahid Parvez, and T. H. Vinayakram. Chaterjee has appeared as part of the purcussion ensemble Taal India.

Chatterjee has performed as a soloist and accompanist. He participated in numerous duet performances with his father.

Internationally, he made his solo debut on BBC World Radio in the UK in 1991 and performed at venues and festivals globally, including Carnegie Hall in New York City, Kennedy Center in Washington D.C., Esplanade Theatres in Singapore, Rietberg Museum in Zurich, the World Percussion Festival in Chicago, Jerash Festival in Jerash, Jordan, Corfu Festival in Corfu, Greece, Dubrovnik Festival in Croatia, Namaste India Festival in Japan, and others. He has been a part of a unique collaboration with jazz legend, Wynton Marsalis at the Lincoln Center Jazz in NewYork.

== Awards ==
- 2001: President's Gold Medal awarded by All India Radio
- 2013: Basavaraj Rajguru Award conferred by the Government of Karnataka
- 2016: Ustad Bismillah Khan Youth Award given by the Sangeet Natak Akademi

== List of festival performances ==
=== 2003 ===
- World Percussion Festival, Chicago
- Rietberg Museum, Zurich

=== 2005 ===
- North American Bengali Conference (NABC), New York City

=== 2006 ===
- The Esplanade Theatres, Singapore

=== 2007 ===
- NABC, Detroit, US
- Jerash Festival, Jordan
- Corfu Festival, Greece
- Dubrovnik Festival, Croatia

=== 2008 ===
- Carnegie Hall, New York City
- Sawai Gandharv Festival, Pune, India

=== 2009 ===
- NABC, Houston, US

=== 2010 ===
- John F. Kennedy Center for the Performing Arts, Washington, DC
- Namaste India Festival, Japan
- Baxter Theatre Centre, Cape Town, South Africa

=== 2011 ===
- Darbar Festival, London
- Saptak Festival, Ahmedabad, India
- Dover Lane Music Conference, Kolkata

=== 2012 ===
- Sukiyaki Festival, Japan
- Metropolitan Museum of Art, New York City
- Darjeeling Carnival, Darjeeling, India
- Sawai Gandharv Festival, Pune

=== 2013 ===
- Chicago Cultural Center, Chicago
- Duke University, Durham, US
- Markham Centennial Centre, Toronto
- Gulbenkian Foundation, Lisbon
- Orchestre national d'Île-de-France, Paris

=== 2014 ===
- Kala Ghoda Festival, Mumbai
- Sankat Mochan Festival, Varanasi, India
- Idea Jalsa, Chennai, India

=== 2015 ===
- Lisbon Orchestra
