= Ranjani (disambiguation) =

Ranjani is a Carnatic raga.

Ranjani may also refer to:

- Shree ranjani, a Carnatic raga
- Ranjani, India a village in Pathardi taluka, Ahmednagar district, Maharashtra State, India

== People ==
- Sriranjani, Sr. (1906–1939), Indian actress and singer
- Sriranjani, Jr. (1927–1974), Indian film actress
- Rajani Thiranagama (1954–1989), Tamil human rights activist and feminist
- Ranjani-Gayatri (fl. from 1997), Carnatic vocal and violin duo
- Ranjani Shettar (born 1977), Indian visual artist

== See also ==
- Sriranjani (disambiguation)
- Ranjan (disambiguation)
