= Raghavendran Rajasekaran =

- Raghavendran during a performance in Esplanade in 2010

Background information
- Also known as: Ragha
- Born: 6 May 1988 (age 38); Singapore
- Origin: India
- Genres: Carnatic, jazz, pop
- Occupation: Flautist
- Instruments: Indian flute, bansuri, guitar
- Years active: 2006–present
- Labels: TisraRoopaSangeeth, Tigaia, Gammarays – Gamelan

Raghavendran Rajasekaran (born 6 May 1988), professionally referred to as Ragha, is a classical flautist based in Singapore. Trained in the traditional Indian baani, he also performs Western music and experiments with different genres of music.

== Early life ==
Ragha was born in Singapore on 6 May 1988, to Smt. Nalini Rajasekaran and Sri Rajasekaran. He has two siblings.

At the age of 11, Ragha started his musical journey with the classical Indian flute under the tutelage of Ghanavenothan Rethnam, who is his guru to date. He also had special training from Trichy L. Saravanan and Pt. Ronu Majumdar, with a scholarship from the National Arts Council of Singapore. Ragha graduated in music from Lasalle College of Arts and Music, Singapore, with a major in jazz music trained under Tim O'Dwyer.

== Performances and accolades ==
Ragha has given performances in art festivals held in Singapore's Signature Parade, the Chingay, Short and Sweet Festival, Pesta Raya, Kala Utsav, Fusion Beats, OCBC Theatre Festival, Heritage Festival, LoudFest, World Beats Festival, Mosaic, FlipSide Festival, Gilles Peterson's World Wide Festival, World Beats (Republic Poly), LoudFest as well as the internationally acclaimed St. Patrick's Day event and the World Folk Song Festival 2008 (Beijing) and Yogyakarta Gamelan Festival 2008 (Indonesia).

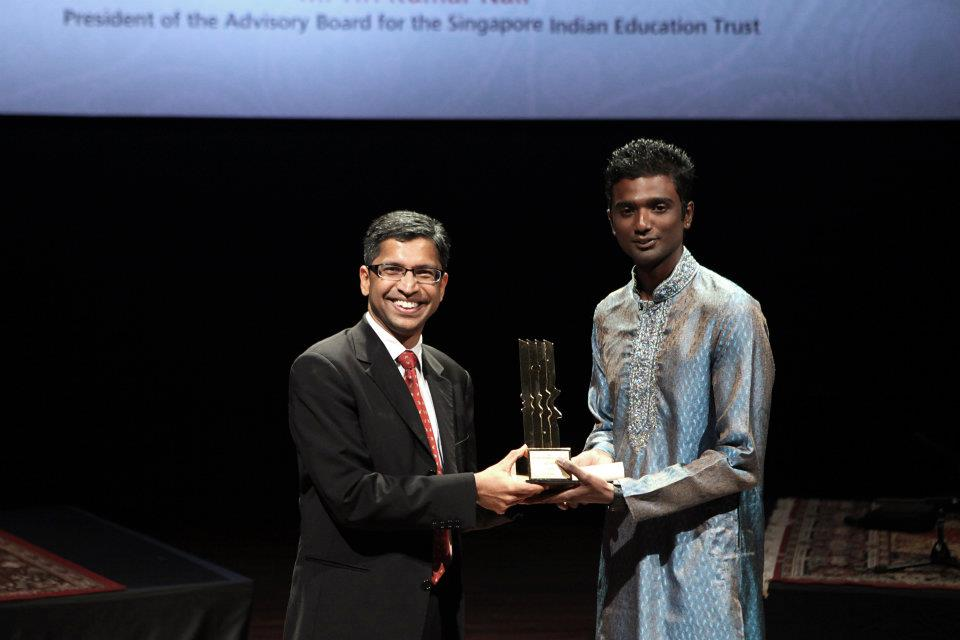
Hri Kumar Nair congratulating Ragha for winning National Indian Music Competition 2011

He has recorded and performed with Singapore's World Renowned percussion outfit Wicked Aura's Debut album (Louder than Light), Gammarays' Debut Album (On the Dance Floor), Johor Bahru's band Manmatha's Second Album, PaperCitizens' (Monster's in Silence) and RUDRA.

Some of his accomplishments are:

- Awarded "Bright Young Things" in a selection of 10 out of 50 participants by the Esplanade Singapore 2010.
- With his participation, the ensemble (Swathi) clinched the 2nd Runner's Up Award at the Singapore National Indian Music Competition 2006.
- Winner of the Open Flute Category of the National Indian Music Competition 2011 organised by the Singapore National Arts Council.
- Represented Singapore in the Asean Youth Camp 2007.
- Received a grant of 1500 SGD from Singapore National Arts Council for Arts Professional Development.
- Received a grant of 6000 SGD from Singapore National Arts Council as part of Presentation and Promotion Grant.
- Received a grant of 1500 SGD from Singapore National Arts Council as part of Arts Professional Development Grant to learn flute from Sri.Ravichandra Kulur in India in March 2013.

In July 2013, he was chosen as an inspirational youth of Singapore and an interview featuring him was telecast in Vasantham television in Paadangal program.

== Bands and music affiliations ==
- Ragha is actively engaged in Swathi, the Nrityalaya Art Academy's youth classical ensemble.
- He is a part of Gammarays, the contemporary ensemble formed by Gamelan Asmaradana which focuses on genres like Jazz, Rock and Pop.
- Tigaia, A Malay word for "three races", is a world music ensemble formed by him along with his friends Ms.Serene Tan and Mr. Joseph Chian focusing on Arts Education and Enrichment. They often give free performances to a full-packed audience, at Esplanande Concourse, Singapore. He has also composed a modern piece called Song of Gendèr for the same.
- TisraRoopaSangeeth is an Indian Classical Trio based on modern thematic original Compositions and interpretations, performed both in Singapore and Abroad. It is the brainchild of Ragha, along with Mr. Kumaran in percussion and Mr. Narayanan in Violin.

== Personal life ==
Apart from being a musician, Ragha has served in the Singapore Police Force as Special Constable Sergeant during his National Service.

He also instructs several students in Singapore and Johor Bahru. He is a devout Hindu and has performed in several temple functions in Singapore and abroad.
