= NIMC =

Nimc or NIMC may refer to:

- National Identity Management Commission, Nigeria
- National Indian Music Competition
- National Institute of Management Calcutta
- National Interfraternity Music Council
- Northern Ireland Milk Cup, A multinational youth association Football tournament
