= Maihar gharana =

School (style) of classical music

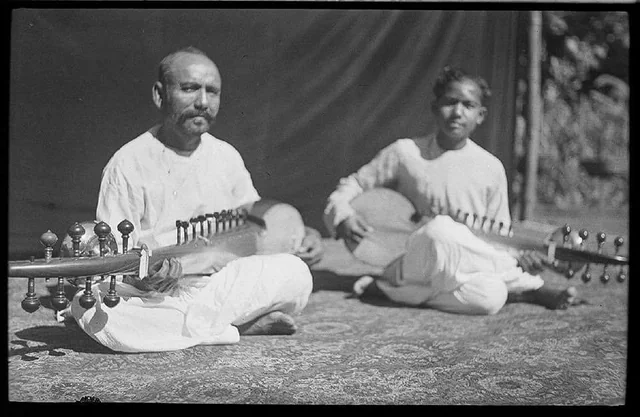
Ustad Allauddin Khan founder of the gharana, with his son Ali Akbar Khan, 1933

The Maihar Gharana or Maihar-Senia Gharana is a gharana or school of classical music, a style of Indian classical music originating in the northern parts of the Indian subcontinent. The school was formed by Allaudin Khan in the princely state of Maihar, now in the central Indian state of Madhya Pradesh, and hence the name. Allauddin Khan learnt music from Vina player Wazir Khan, an exponent of the Senia gharana. The Maihar gharana is therefore sometimes referred to as the Maihar-Senia gharana.

== Overview ==
It is one of the most prominent gharanas of the 20th century; much of the fame of Hindustani classical music in the west stems from this gharana. Prominent musicians belonging to the Maihar gharana include prominent sitar players Ravi Shankar, Nikhil Banerjee, Allauddin Khan's son sarod player Ali Akbar Khan, daughter Annapurna Devi and grandsons Aashish Khan, Dhyanesh Khan, Pranesh Khan, Rajesh Ali Khan, Alam Khan, Manik Khan and Shiraz Ali Khan.

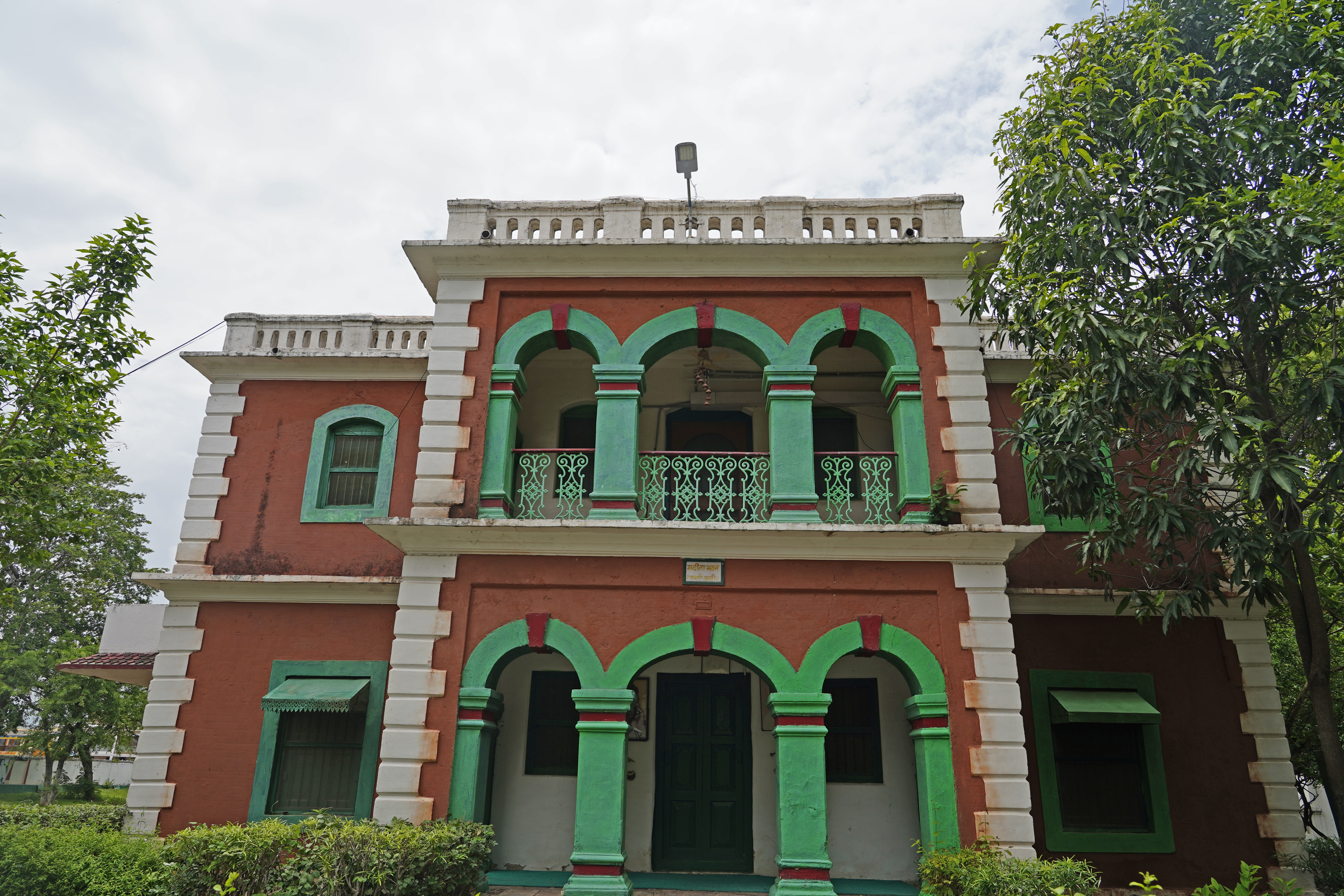
Ustad Allauddin Khan's residence in Maihar, Madhya Pradesh, now preserved as his memorial.

Other prominent musicians with links to this gharana include the sarod player Bahadur Khan, Sharan Rani, Vasant Rai, Kamlesh Moitra, Kamal Mallick, Rajesh Chandra Moitra, Rajeev Taranath, Tejendra Narayan Majumdar, Dr. Rajib Chakraborty, Debanjan Bhattacharjee, Pratik Srivastava, Soumava Bhusan Chakraborty, Pradeep Barot, Shamim Ahmed Khan, Gourab Deb, Damodar Lal Kabra, Apratim Majumdar, Vikash Maharaj, Jyotin Bhattacharya, Abhisek Lahiri, Vishal Maharaj, B.N.Choudhury, and Basant Kabra, violinist V. G. Jog, Sishir kona Dhor Chowdhury, Indradip Ghosh, Souvik Chakrabortty, guitarists Brij Bhushan Kabra, Vishwa Mohan Bhatt and his nephew Krishna Bhatt, Manju Mehta, flautists Pannalal Ghosh, Hariprasad Chaurasia, Nityanand Haldipur, Rupak Kulkarni, Rakesh Chaurasia, Milind Date, Vivek Sonar, MILIND SHEOREY and Ronu Majumdar, and sitar players Chandrakant Sardeshmukh, Kartick Kumar and his son Niladri Kumar, Kushal Das, Jaya Biswas, Abhishek Maharaj, Bhaskar Chandavarkar, Indraneel Bhattacharya ,Sudhir Phadke, Sandhya Phadke-Apte.

Musicians belonging to the gharana adhere to a dhrupad aesthetic in their approach to playing the alap and jor portions in a raga. Variations in tempo are used to demarcate sections while playing the jor, with a short rhythmic figure indicating closure of a section. Therefore, rhythmic figures within the jor assume structural importance. Alap-jor is followed by a khayal style vilambit gat with taan improvisations, and the performance ends with a jhala.
