= Anubrata =

Anubrata is an Indian masculine given name. Notable people with the name include:

- Anubrata Basu (born 1989), Bengali film actor
- Anubrata Chatterjee (born 1984), Indian tabla player
- Anubrata Mondal (born 1960), Indian politician
