= Spoorthi Rao =

Indian singer

Spoorthi in 2015 with the trophy awarded by Super Singer Junior

Spoorthi Rao (born 3 April 2005) is an Indian singer of Carnatic music.

Spoorthi is from Bengaluru and lived in Arkansas as a child. Her full name is Spoorthi Santosh Rao and she has a younger brother. At five year old, she won a singing competition in California and became a child singer on All India Radio at age eight. She attended Sri Aurobindo Memorial School in Bengaluru in 2014.

In 2015, she won season 4 of the singing competition television series Super Singer Junior on Vijay TV. The judges included K. S. Chithra, Mano, and Malgudi Subha. Spoorthi learned Tamil before performing on the show. Spoorthi performed as part of the Super Singer World Tour in England, Australia, Canada, and Sri Lanka.

Her family later moved to Chennai to support her singing. Spoorthi had originally studied Carnatic music under Yashasvi Subbarao and has learned from Ranjani–Gayatri since 2015. She studied light music from Narahari Dixit. Spoorthi was awarded the Kempegowda Award in 2015.

In 2019, she gave her debut performance of Carnatic music at Rasika Ranjani Sabha (R. R. Sabha), Chennai. She has since toured in India, the United Kingdom, Canada, Singapore, Indonesia, and the United States. Spoorthi is part of the fusion band Viprahar. In 2026, she performed solo for Darbar Festival at Milton Court (part of the Barbican Estate).

Spoorthi studied electronics and communication engineering at B.M.S. College of Engineering in 2025.
