= Rupak =

Rupak may refer to:

- Rupak Ginn, Indian-American actor
- Rupak Kulkarni (born 1968), Indian musician
- Rupak Sarmah, Indian politician for Nowgong constituency, Assam
- Rupak Tala, a tala in Hindustani music
