= Jyotsna Srikanth =

Indian violinist

Jyotsna Srikanth MBE
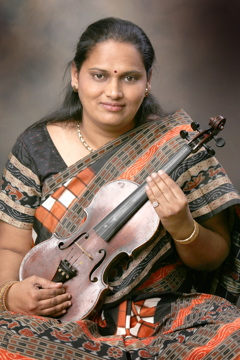
- Live concert, 2011
- Born: Bangalore
- Known for: Carnatic music, Western music

Jyotsna Srikanth is an Indian-British violinist and composer, performing Carnatic music and Western classical music.

== Early life ==
Srikanth was born into an Andhra musical family in Bangalore, India. Her mother, Ratna Srikantaiah, is a Carnatic musician and teacher.

== Musical life ==
=== Training ===
Srikanth's music training began with Carnatic vocals at age five under her mother. It was a rigorous programme of coaching, with practice for six hours daily, and the attendance of concerts during the festival periods.

At the age of six, she attended a violin performance by the virtuoso Kunnakudi Vaidyanathan, which sparked her own interest in the instrument. She began training under R. R. Keshavamurthy, a doyen of classical Indian violin. Her first solo concert was at the age of nine.

Srikanth recognised the necessity of learning the western classical style of violin, and began her training in this genre at the Bangalore School of Music. For more advanced training, she went to Chennai to study with V. S. Narasimhan, a solo violinist who works with the notable Indian composer Ilaiyaraaja. She achieved her grading from the Royal School of Music, London.

=== Career ===
Srikanth's initial foray into music came in the film industry, playing under the direction of film composers such as Hamsalekha and Ilaiyaraaja. By her account, she has played for over two hundred south Indian films.

Following her marriage, she moved to London, where she expanded her repertoire to music scores for documentaries (on Discovery and National Geographic), teleserials, besides performing at global music events such as WOMAD, the Red Violin Festival, the Cleveland Thyagaraja Festival, and the BBC Proms.

Srikanth also performs jazz and fusion, and has set up a troupe called Fusion Dreams,. She has collaborated with the classical guitarist Simon Thacker, and the flamenco/jazz guitarist Eduardo Niebla., as well as Fado saxophonist Rão Kyao.

Srikanth has lectured on comparative techniques between the Indian and western classical violin at the University of Cambridge and Liverpool University.

She established a foundation Dhruva Arts to help upcoming Indian artistes to perform in the United Kingdom, as well as raise funds for charity.

In 2012, she organised the London International Arts Festival, a series of concerts of Carnatic, fusion, folk and Balkan music, as well as dance performances from Cyprus and India.

Srikanth continues her Carnatic music career as a soloist and as an accompanist, and has accompanied masters such as Dr M. Balamuralikrishna, Kadri Gopalnath, Chitravina Ravikiran, Ranjani-Gayatri, Sudha Ragunathan, Jayanthi Kumaresh, Sanjay Subrahmanyan, Nithyasree Mahadevan, R. K. Srikantan Aruna Sairam, A K Palanivel, .

Srikanth specialises in the following Indian composers: Thyagaraja, Purandara Dasaru, Papanasam Sivan, Annamacharya, Muthuswami Dikshitar, Shyama Sastri and Mysore Vasudevachar. Jyotsna hosts London International Arts Festival and is the Artistic Director of Dhruv Arts, in the U.K.

=== Honours and awards ===
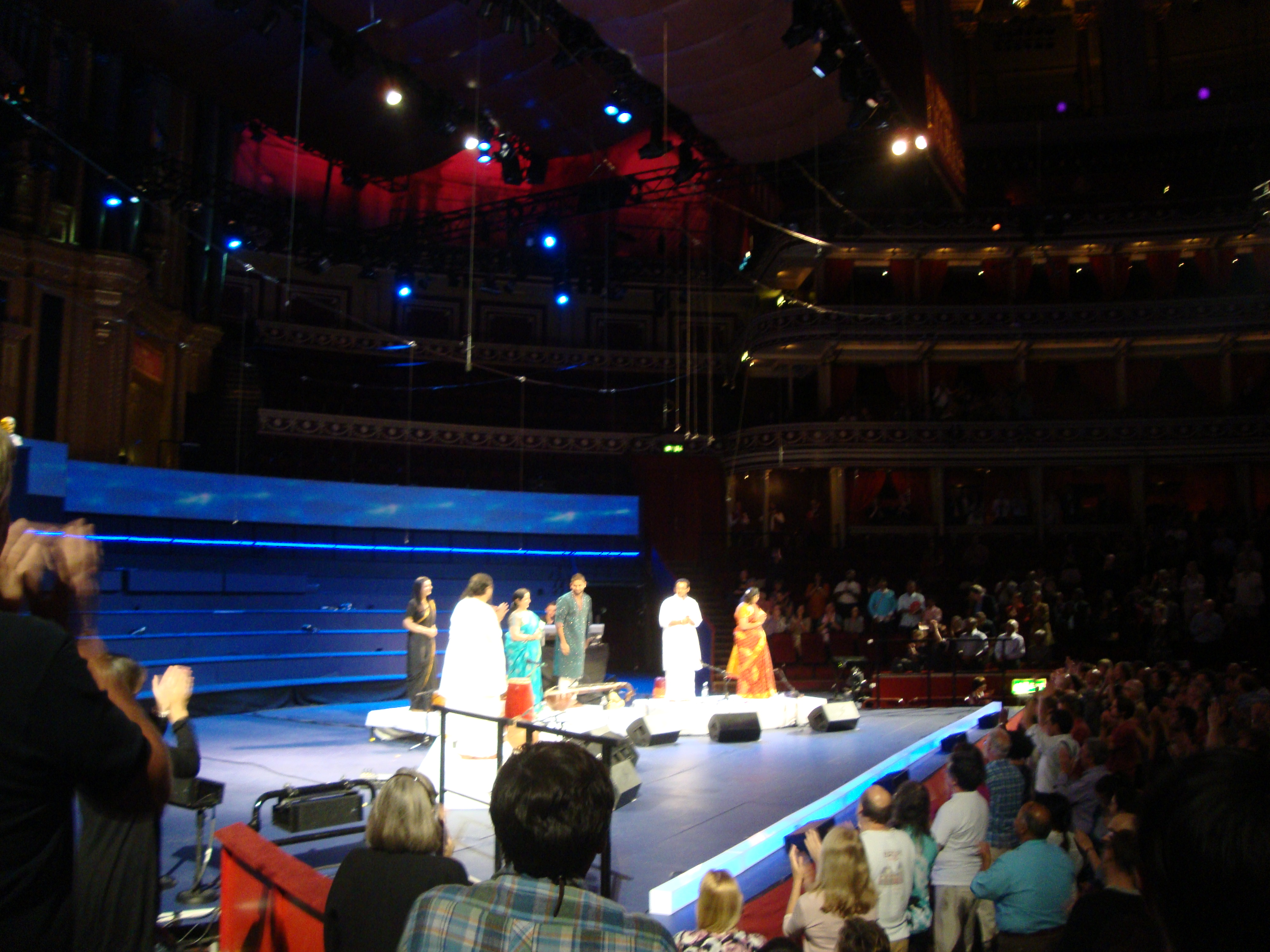
Concert at the BBC Proms

Her violin playing and music style has been referred to as "amazing".

In 2008, she received a Fellowship in Carnatic Music from the Trinity College of Music, London.

She was appointed Member of the Order of the British Empire (MBE) in the 2023 Birthday Honours for services to music and charitable endeavours.

== Discography ==
- Sri Tyagaraja Raga on Strings, PM Audios & Entertainments, 2023.
- Carnatic Lounge, Times Music, 2011.
- Chants for Children, Theme Musik, 2011.
- Carnatic Jazz, Swathi Sanskriti, 2011.
- Alaiapayudhe, CD Baby, 2010.
- Fusion Dreams, CD Baby, 2008.
- Insight, Fountain Music, 2008.
- Life, Earthnbeat, 2007.
- Carnatic Connection, 2016
