= Kempegowda Award =

Award for notable contributions of civilians in India

- Award for individual contributions to fields of medicine, education etc.
- Awarded for: Civilian award in Karnataka
- Sponsored by: BBMP
- Final award: 2025
- Website: BBMP

The Kempegowda Award or Nadaprabhu Kempegowda Award is a civilian award presented annually by Bruhat Bengaluru Mahanagara Palike (BBMP), Bengaluru, Karnataka, India.

The award nomination is based on the notable contributions of civilians, in the field of medicine, education, media, sports, theatre, film, literature, environment, folklore, music, dance, yogasana, judiciary, journalism, culture, photography, social service, astrology and painting.

On 16 August 2018, more than 250 people with notable achievements were presented the award, in a ceremony held at Dr. Rajkumar Glasshouse, BBMP office, Bangalore.

== History ==
The award is named after the feudatory ruler of Vijayanagara Empire, Nadaprabhu Hiriya Kempe Gowda, who built the city of Bengaluru in 1537. The award ceremony is organized annually, in April, on the eve of Kempegowda's birthday, which is seen in the state as Kempegowda day or ′Kempegowda Jayanthi′ which is on 27 June. The award presentation was temporarily paused in 2007, and after a gap of four years, it was reinitiated in 2011.

=== 2017 ===
On 11 April 244 people were awarded in the ceremony, where Karaga was also held. BBMP decided to award all its permanent employees with the ′Civic service employees' award′.

=== 2016 ===
On 22 April 162 people were presented the award, in the ceremony.

=== 2015 ===
On 4 April, the ceremony was held and 94 people were awarded.

=== 2014 ===
187 people were awarded including a cash prize of ₹12,000.

=== 2013 ===
109 people were awarded including a cash prize of ₹15,000.

=== 2012 ===
50 people were awarded including a cash prize of ₹25,000.

=== 2011 ===
274 people were awarded including a cash prize of ₹20,000.

== Kempegowda Awardees List of Year 2019 ==
| Awardee | Area of Achievement | Highlights |
|---|---|---|
| B. N. Subramanya | Journalist | |

== Kempegowda Awardees List of Year 2018 ==
| Awardee | Area of Achievement | Highlights |
|---|---|---|
| Gireesha Yadava A. M. | Social worker | |
| Gaurish Akki | Journalist | |

== Kempegowda Awardees List of Year 2017 ==
| Awardee | Area of Achievement | Highlights |
|---|---|---|
| Prof. M.H Krishnaiyya | Literature | |
| Dr. Vasundara Bhoopathi | Literature | |
| Saiyad Khadir Moyiddin | Literature | |
| Dr. M.A Jayachandra | Literature | |
| K.V Rajeshwari | Literature | |
| B. Satyanarayanachar | Literature | |
| D. Ramaiah | Literature | |
| R.S Vasavamba | Literature | |
| Harajenahalli Gujjaiyya | Literature | |
| D.S Hanumantha Rao | Literature | |
| K.S Nagaraju | Literature | |
| Prof. Narayana Ghatti | Literature | |
| Dr.Muddumohan | Music | |
| Dr Thriveni B.S | Medicine | |
| Hasmitha Ganesh | Bharathanatya | |

== Awardees List of 2016 ==
| Awardee | Area of Achievement | Highlights |

== Awardees List of 2015 ==
| Awardee | Area of Achievement | Highlights |
|---|---|---|
| Spoorthi Rao | Music | |

== Awardees List of 2014 ==
| Awardee | Area of Achievement | Highlights |

== Awardees List of 2013 ==
| Awardee | Area of Achievement | Highlights |

== Awardees List of 2012 ==
| Awardee | Area of Achievement | Highlights |
