= Rail (2024 film) =

Indian drama film

- Theatrical release poster
- Directed by: Bhaskar Sakthi
- Written by: Bhaskar Sakthi
- Produced by: M. Vediyappan
- Starring: Kungumaraj Muthusamy; Parvaiz Mahroo; Vairamala
- Cinematography: Theni Eswar
- Edited by: Nagooran Ramachandran
- Music by: S. J. Jananiy
- Production company: Discovery Cinemas
- Distributed by: Thirrupathi Brothers; Cinema Palace Private Limited
- Release date: 21 June 2024
- Country: India
- Language: Tamil

Rail is a 2024 Indian Tamil-language drama film written and directed by Bhaskar Sakthi. The film stars Kungumaraj Muthusamy, Parvaiz Mahroo, Vairamala and Ramesh Vaidya. The film was produced by M. Vediyappan under the banner of Discovery Cinemas, and had a theatrical release on 21 June 2024.

== Cast ==
- Kungumaraj Muthusamy as Muthaiah
- Parvaiz Mahroo as Sunil
- Vairamala as Chellama
- Ramesh Vaidya as Varadhan
- Shameera as Dimple
- Senthil Kochadai as Dhandapani

== Production ==
The film was produced by M. Vediyappan. The cinematography of the film was by Theni Eswar, and the editing was handled by Nagooran Ramachandran. Earlier, film was titled as "Vadakkan" and later Central Board of Film Certification requested to change title and renamed as "Rail"

== Reception ==
Manigandan KR of Times Now rated three out of five and noted that "Rail might not be your conventional commercial entertainer but it certainly is a neat, convincing, meaningful film that has a point to make."

Abhinav Subramanian of The Times of India stated that "Kungumaraj and Vairamala did what the script asked, and they’re solid. Ramesh Vaidya’s screenscape is decent and some of his comedy lands."

Akshay Kumar of Cinema Express rated the film three out of five stars. Minnambalam also reviewed the film.
