= Chandrakant Sardeshmukh =

Indian musician

Chandrakant Sardeshmukh (1955 – 15 August 2011) was an Indian classical sitar player of the Maihar Gharana school.

== Education ==
Sardeshmukh was taught by Ustad Shabuddin Khan and Khurshid Mirajkar from the age of 4, and became popular as child artist. He performed in the Sawai Gandharva Music Festival in Pune in 1963. In the same year, when he was eight years old, he was declared a child prodigy by Pandit Ravi Shankar, who accepted him as a student. From then until 1976 he learned with both Shankar and his wife Annapurna Devi. In 1976 he was awarded Sangeet Vibhushan (Sitar Pravin) by University of Rajasthan.

After his first successful concert tour to Germany in 1982, he focused on his Ph.D. He was awarded a Ph.D. in the Samavedic basis of Indian music from University of Poona in 1987.

== Academic work and organisational affiliations ==
Dr. Sardeshmukh was visiting professor to the Instrumental Music Department of Shivaji University, Kolhapur and the University of Poona . He was also an ad hoc board member, 1990-2000 for Shivaji University, Kolhapur It was Dr. Sardeshmukh's idea to establish the Lalit Kala Kendra (Centre for Performing Arts) on Pune University campus. He was a student founder, ad hoc board member and member of the advisory committee for this department from 1987 to 1990. He was also honorary joint coordinator of the Lalit Kala Kendra during the same period. As a student at the University of Poona, Dr. Sardeshmukh won a number of awards in various state and national level competitions for his alma mater during 1982 till 1990. He also formed MUDRA (Music and Drama Arts Circle) on campus. Dr. Sardeshmukh co-authored the paper "Analytical and Computerized Music Composition with Reference to Samavedic Gana Text," published in the IEEE Transactions on Acoustic Speech and Signal Processing, New York, USA. This research was also presented at the World Sanskrit Conference held in Bangalore in 1987 where it was much appreciated by traditional Samavedic scholars from South India who were awed at his mastery in overcoming computer related difficulties in generating the chanting sound.

He conducted a series of lecture-demonstrations for South Australian colleges in 1990. Since 1991, he has given lectures and demonstrations about Indian music at various Japanese Universities including those in Gifu, Nagoya and Tokyo.

In 1999, he conducted lecture-demonstrations, workshops and performances for a joint project involving dance, drama and music at the Centre for the Performing Arts, Adelaide Institute of Training and Further Education (TAFE SA); the Drama Centre, Flinders University; the Elder Conservatorium-School of Performing Arts, University of Adelaide and the Noarlunga Music Centre, Onkaparinga Institute of TAFE SA. The award of a grant for funding from the Helpmann Academy for the Visual and Performing Arts supported the project.

He presented a seminar to composers of electronic music at the Faculty of Performing Arts, University of Adelaide, South Australia, 1998. An integral part of this work was the input of material performed on sitar by Dr. Sardeshmukh, which was realized as subsequent electronic compositions and issued as a compact disc. This opened a unique cross-cultural perspective on the use of technology in music.

== Touring ==
He has given hundreds of performances during the period of 1990-2011 and has toured around the world extensively, giving concerts in India, Germany, Australia, Japan, and the United States. He recorded traditional Indian music as well as experimented with several western and Japanese musicians.

== Ayurveda ==
He had knowledge and background in Ayurveda (Indian medicine) from his father. He did extensive research in healing music and gave several healing music sessions to individuals and groups as well as disabled children and their parents.

== Death ==
Sardeshmukh died in a car accident near Solapur on 15 August 2011. He was 56 years old.
