= Ranjan =

Ranjan is a given name deriving from Sanskrit meaning Kind King. It may refer to:

- Ranjan (surname) - It is a last name mainly found in Bihar, Jharkhand among the Maithili Brahmin communities. It along with Raj (Surname), Rajan (Surname) is used as a caste-neutral surname in Bihar. The last name is also found in Uttar Pradesh and Haryana amongst the Bhumihar Brahmins. The last name also has a relatively small population in Punjab and Haryana mainly amongst the Punjabi Khatri and the Jats, The Ranjan Khatri and the Jat families adopted the last name whilst following Arya Samaj.
- Ranjan (actor) (1918–1983) (real name Ramanarayana Venkataramana Sarma), Indian film actor, singer, journalist and writer
- Ranjan Ghosh, Indian screenwriter
- Ranjan Ghosh (academic), Indian academic and teacher
- Ranjan Gogoi (born 1954), former Judge of the Supreme Court of India
- Ranjan Madugalle (born 1959), Sri Lankan cricket player
- Ranjan Mathai (born 1952), Indian foreign minister
- Ranjan Pramod, Indian filmmaker
- Ranjan Ramanayake (1963), Sri Lankan actor, film director, and politician
- Abhishek Ranjan, Indian politician
- Ranjan Wijeratne (1931–1991) Sri Lankan politician
- Anushka Ranjan (born 1990), Indian actress and model
- Akansha Ranjan (born 1993), Indian actress, sister of Anushka
- Ranjan (film), a 2017 Indian Marathi-language film
- 22543 Ranjan, an asteroid

== See also ==
- Ranjana (disambiguation)
- Ranjani (disambiguation)
