= Sriranjani Santhanagopalan =

Indian singer

- Born: Chennai, Tamil Nadu, India
- Other names: Sriranjani Tapasya
- Occupation: singer
- Known for: Carnatic music

Sriranjani Santhanagopalan (born 1990 or 1991) is an Indian singer specialized in Carnatic music.

== Early life and career ==
Sriranjani was born and raised in Chennai. She is the daughter of Carnatic singer Neyveli Santhanagopalan. Sriranjani had received no singing training until the age of 17.

She has been an 'A' graded artist on All India Radio since 2013. Sriranjani had received the award for the Best Vocalist (Junior) by The Music Academy by 2015. The Madras Music Academy recognized her for "outstanding lecture demonstration" in 2022. Sriranjani participated in panel discussion for the Music Academy in 2024.

Sriranjani has performed for the Madras Music Season at the Music Academy in 2023 and 2024, as well as at Krishna Gana Sabha in 2024 and in Madurai for the 73rd Music and Arts Festival in 2025.

She performed at Darbar Festival in 2025 under her stage name Sriranjani Tapasya.
