= Darjeeling Carnival =

Annual carnival in Darjeeling, India

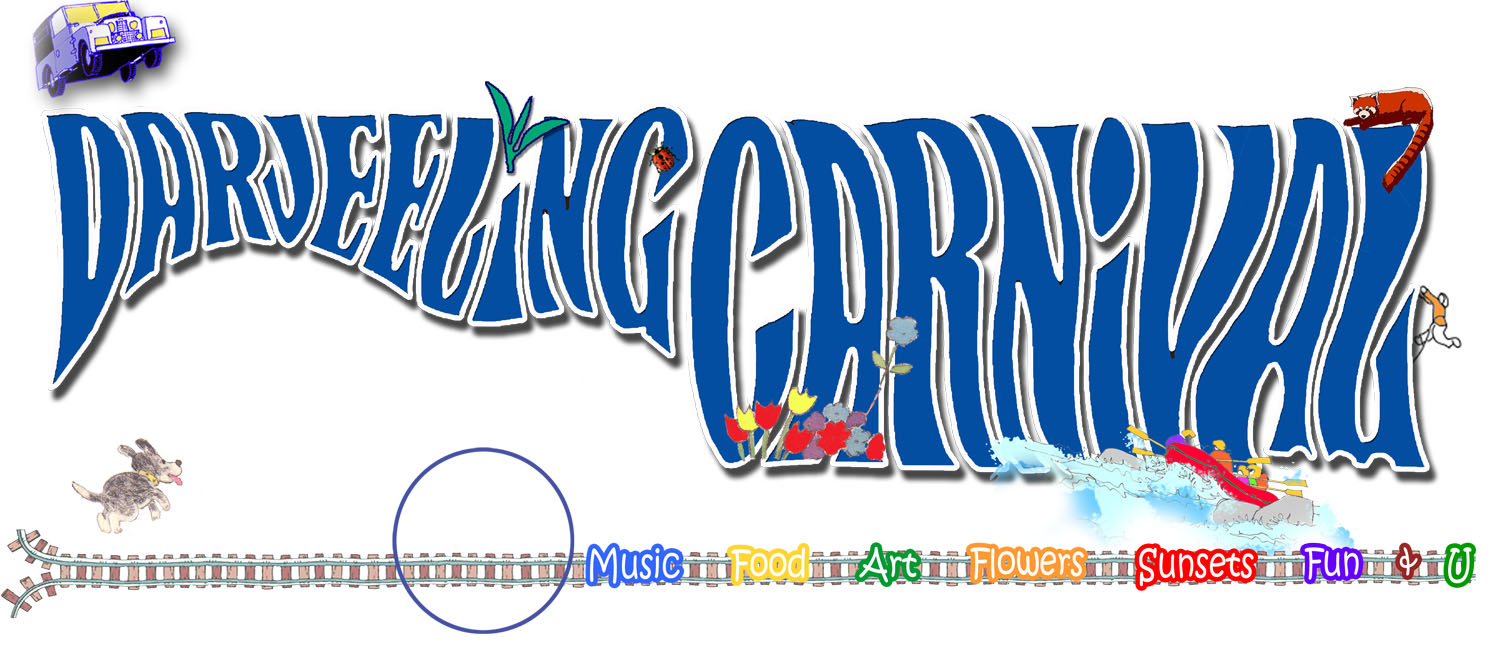
Official Darjeeling Carnival Logo

Darjeeling Carnival is a ten-day carnival arranged in the town of Darjeeling, West Bengal, India.

The carnival consists of several functions like poetry-reading sessions, painting and photo exhibitions, tea-drinking ceremonies, a Land Rover rally, music concerts and ethnic food festivals. The Carnival was started by a group of young people in Darjeeling known as the "Darjeeling Initiative", and its main purpose was to get over the violent agitation in the eighties amongst the youth of Darjeeling. The carnival is usually held in the month of November every year. Darjeeling being famous with local rock bands, the music concerts are especially popular among the people.

An enhancement to Darjeeling Carnival, an annual 10-day cultural event held in Darjeeling India was the participation of the Russian Cultural Centre, which staged an exhibit of Nicholas Roerich reproductions along with a photographic exhibit highlighting the cultural links between India and Russia.

== Interaction and Networking ==
The Darjeeling Festival will be a natural setting for interactions between a range of stakeholders connected to the Darjeeling Hill Areas in many ways. These will include fields as varied as the hospitality industry, travel trade, tea industry, NGOs, alumni of Darjeeling schools and colleges, artists, writers and well wishers of the Darjeeling Hills

The Darjeeling Initiative ( Promoters of The Darjeeling Carnival )

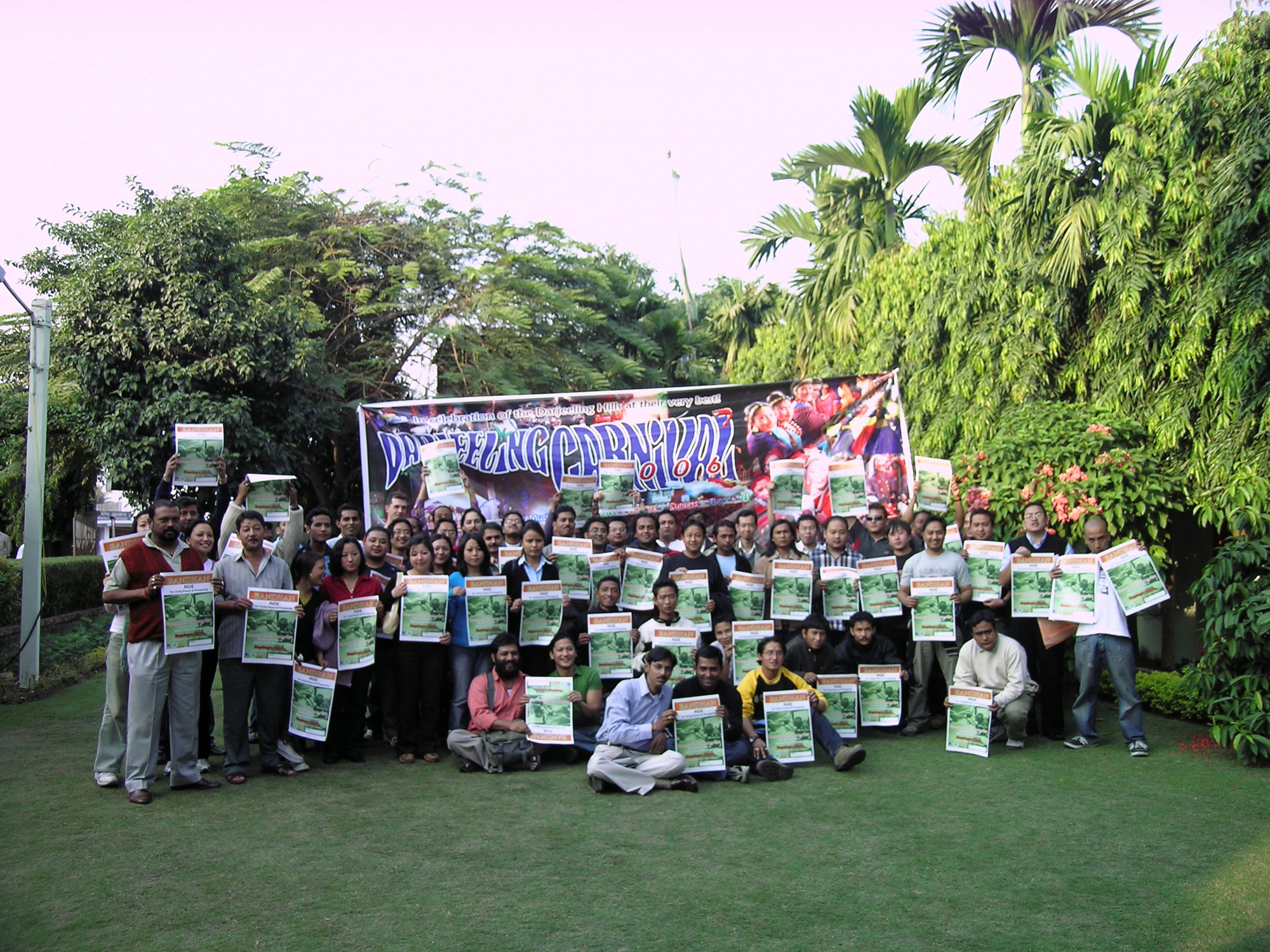
Darjeeling Initiative - Promoters of Darjeeling Carnival

The Darjeeling Initiative is a group of like-minded locals, mostly in their youth, from diverse backgrounds, coming together with the aim to make a positive impact on the socio-economy of the Darjeeling Hills. The group includes development workers, businessmen, hotel and restaurant owners, tour operators, lawyers, doctors, professionals, college students and unemployed youth.

The majority of this group consists of people who lost a major part of their teenage and youth on account of the violent separate statehood agitation that rocked Darjeeling in the late 1980s. Today, almost 20 years later, the group believes it's time to move on, by pro-actively working towards a better Darjeeling Hills.

The Darjeeling Initiative is actively involved in a wide range of activities in the rural and urban areas of the Darjeeling Hills essentially centred upon pro-active community mobilisation and include among others, livelihood issues, disaster preparedness, drug abuse and HIV-AIDS awareness, community celebrations and heritage awareness.

== See also ==
- Chowrasta
