= Ronu Majumdar =

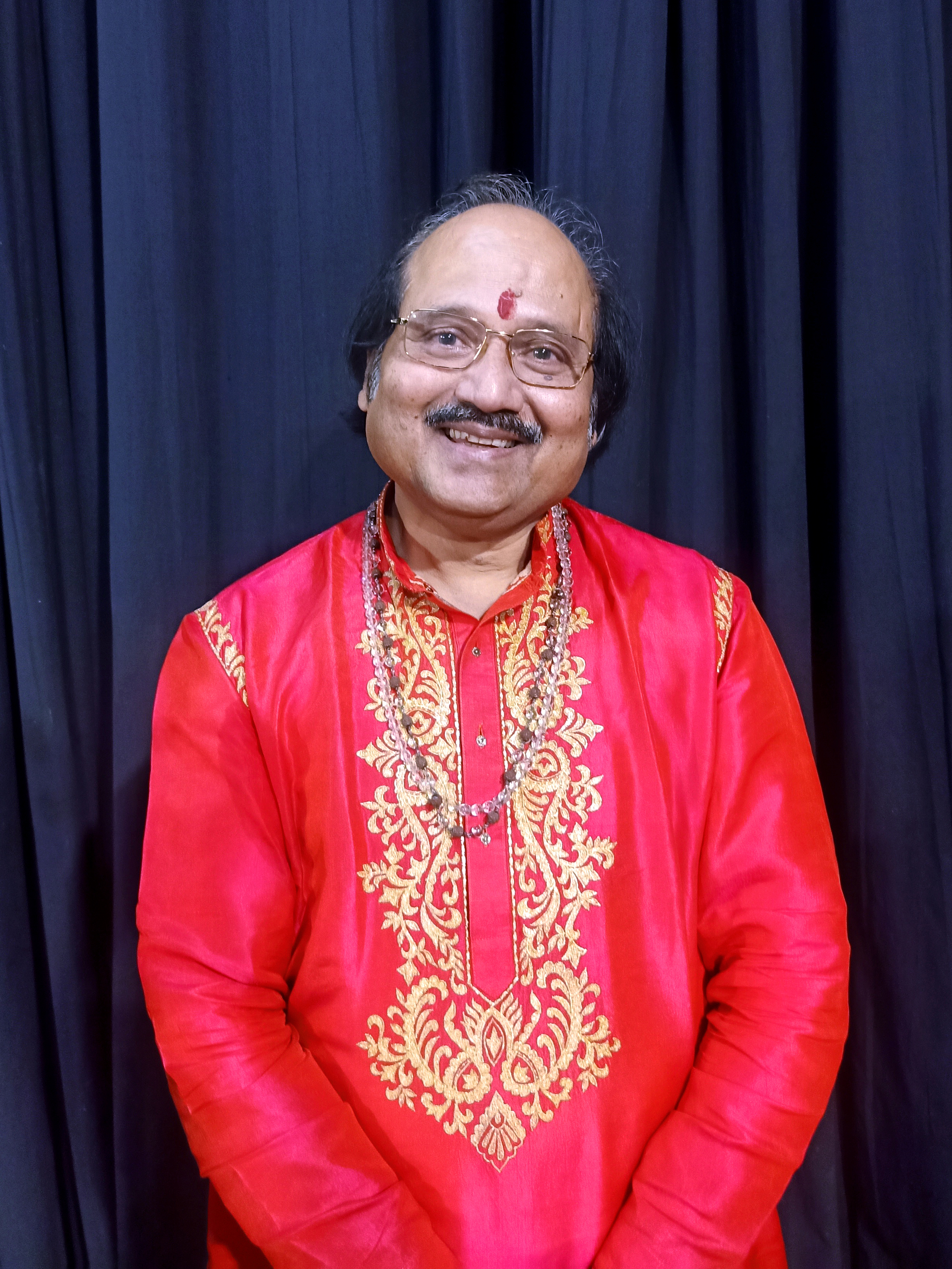
- Ronu Majumdar in September 2024

Background information
- Born: Ranendranath Majumdar; 22 June 1963 (age 62); Benares, India
- Occupation: Flute player
- Instrument: Flute
- Awards: Padma Shri; Sangeet Natak Akademi award
- Website: www.ronumajumdar.com

Ronu Majumdar (Born 22 June 1963) is an Indian flautist (Bansuri player) in the Hindustani classical music tradition.

== Early life ==
Ronu Majumdar was born in Benares. His father was a homeopathic doctor, oil painter, and amateur flautist who took lessons from Pandit Pannalal Ghosh, who provided him with a strong early grounding.

== Awards, nominations, and music collaborations ==
Ronu Majumdar started playing the flute under the guidance of his father Bhanu Majumdar, Laxman Prasad Jaipurwale, and Vijay Raghav Rao.

In 1981, Ronu Majumdar won the first prize at the All India Radio competition, and the President's gold medal.

He has associated with Pandit Ravi Shankar on albums like Passages and Chants of India. He has more than 30 audio releases to his credit. He won the prestigious Aditya Vikram Birla Award in 1999 for his dedication to music. Sahara India Pariwar felicitated him with a lifetime achievement award on the occasion of Jyoti Diwas 2001. In 2014 he won the prestigious Sangeet Natak Akademi award.

Today, Ronu Majumdar is among the more popular musicians on this instrument, and is especially popular with the younger generation for his creative improvisations. Pt Majumdar's music is rooted in the Maihar gharana which has musicians of eminence like Pt Ravi Shankar and Ustad Ali Akbar Khan to its credit. Apart from his concerts all over India in different music festivals, he also participated in the Festival of India in Moscow and Asiad '82 in New Delhi. He has toured extensively in Europe, the United States, Canada, Japan, Singapore, Thailand, Australia, New Zealand and the Middle East.

Majumdar is also known for a number of collaborations and jugalbandis with other leading instrumentalists. An innovative composer, he has also composed several pieces in a fusion of Hindustani classical with other forms of music, particularly Western classical music, including the projects Carrying Hope (Music Today), A Traveller's Tale, Song of Nature (Magnasound), Kal Akela Kahan (Plus Music).

Majumdar has also provided short training sessions to budding young artists like Raghavendran Rajasekaran from Singapore. Most recently, he conducted a concert of 5,378 flautists on one stage called Venu Naad under the banner of ‘Art of Living’. This event was recorded in the Guinness Book of World Records.

He became a music producer for Nadi Ki Beti Sundari (A Forgotten Daughter), a Bollywood movie produced by Nikhil Chandwani under Walnut Discoveries Pvt. Ltd.

He has arranged and conducted the 100th edition of the Tansen Samaroh festival in Gwalior Madhya Pradesh on 15 December 2024. It was performed by 546 musicians, the largest Hindustani classical band and has won Guinness book of world record.

Majumdar received the Padma Shri award from President Droupadi Murmu in April 2025. He dedicated his award to the families of the Kashmir victims.
