= Vinayak Torvi =

Vinayak Malharrao Torvi

Background information
- Also known as: Vinayak Torvi
- Born: Vinayak; 4 September 1948 (age 77); Ranebennur, Karnataka, India
- Genres: Hindustani classical music
- Occupation: Vocalist
- Years active: 1960 - present

Pandit Vinayak Malharrao Torvi (born 4 September 1948) is an Indian classical vocalist. He belongs to the Gwalior and Kirana gharanas (singing styles).

== Early life and training ==
Pandit Vinayak Torvi was born on 4 September 1948 in Ranebennur, in Karnataka. His father Malharrao Torvi was a Harikatha (musical discourse) exponent. He developed a passion for music, while listening to and accompanying his father during discourses. He started formal musical education at the age of 9 under Tammanna Gurav and then under Narayanacharya Dandapur.

Pandit ji received training in Hindustani classical vocal music for 15 years in Gurukul (a traditional system of learning employed in various disciplines throughout India), first from Gururao Deshpande, and later from Bhimsen Joshi of the Kirana gharana.

Pandit ji received further reinforcement from musical greats such as Gangubai Hangal, Mallikarjun Mansur and Basavraj Rajguru during his PG studies in music at Karnataka University, Dharwad.

== Career ==
Pandit ji's career started in 1960, as he started performing in music concerts and winning various state and national level music competitions. In the early 1970s he earned a bachelor's degree in music from Karnataka University Dharwad.

In 1976, Pandit ji became A graded artiste of All India Radio. At around the same time, in the late 70s, he earned his Masters in classical music from Karnataka University. Pandit Vinayak Torvi worked for Canara Bank. In 1980 Pandit ji performed in his first major national level concert, a music conference organised by ITC at Hubli. He later served on the board of Karnataka state Sangeet Nritya Academy for two consecutive terms.

In 1983 Pandit ji established Gururao Deshpande Sangeet Sabha in Bangalore, which was inaugurated by the musician Gangubai Hangal. "'Sangeeta Yatra' Today". Deccan Herald. September 2007.

In 1991-92, Pandit ji toured England, Scotland, and France for concert and lecture cum demonstrations. This tour was sponsored by the Indian Council for Cultural Relations (ICCR). Since 1985, Pandit Vinayak Torvi has performed at several music conferences."तोरवी यांच्या गायनाने महोत्सवात रंग भरला". Ravivar Sakal रविवार सकाळ. 14 February 1988., Tansen Festival, ITC SRA Kolkata among others. He was named artist of the month, by ITC SRA. Since 1991, Torvi has toured abroad, for concerts and lectures, demonstrations in various countries such as USA, England, Australia, Gulf countries etc. "A Treat For Music Lovers". Gulf Times. 14 March 2004. His music has been greatly appreciated by people worldwide. "Rare Talent". City Beat. 27 May 2008. "तोरवी यांच्या गायनाने महोत्सवात रंग भरला". Ravivar Sakal रविवार सकाळ. 14 February 1988. "Vintage Hindustani". The New Sunday Express, Chennai. 28 July 2002.

== Awards and recognition ==
- Surmani from SurSingar Sansad, Mumbai - 1982-83
- Rajyostav Award, Government of Karnataka - 1990
- Chowdiah Memorial Award, Bangalore - 02.11.1996
- Shruthi Sagara, Vasundhara Performing Arts Center, Mysore - 20.12.2004
- Swara Sadhana award from Ratna Swara Sadhana Samithi, Mumbai - 05.03.2005
- Kirana Gharana Award from Music Forum, Mumbai - 05.01.2006
- Sangeetya Puravankara Puraskar from Sangeet Asthan, Bangalore - 18.11.2006
- Nadashree Award from Hindustani Kalakar Mandali, Bangalore - 15.11.2008
- Chandrahasa Award from Sangeet Seva Samithi, Sorab - 07.02.2009
- Aryabhatta Prashasti, Aryabhatta Cultural Organization, Bangalore - 02.04.2011
- Karnataka Kala Tilaka, Sangeet Nritya Academy, Karnataka State
- Celebrity Artiste of SRA, Kolkata.
- Parishath Puraskara, Karnataka Gana Kala Parishath, Bangalore.
- Gaayana Gandharva from KGF Music Association.
