= Abhisek Lahiri =

Indian musician

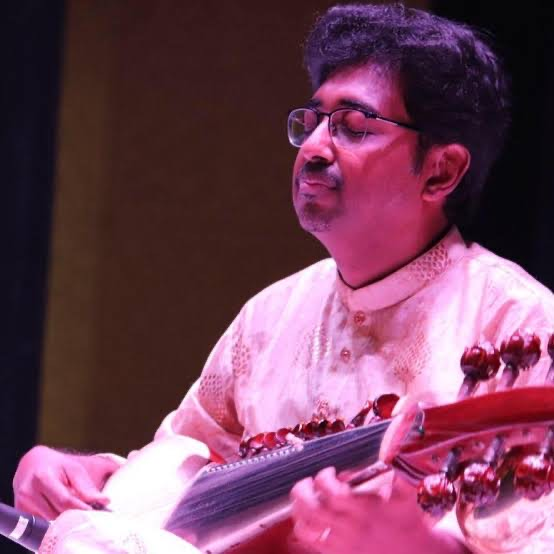
- Born: Howrah, West Bengal, India
- Citizenship: Indian
- Years active: 1994–present
- Parents: Pt. Alok Lahiri (father); Kajal Lahiri (mother)
- Awards: President Award, GiMA nominations, Anun lund rej memorial award, The Telegraph School award
- Website: http://abhiseklahiri.com/

Abhisek Lahiri (born September 24) is an Indian classical sarod player. He trained in the three major gharanas of sarod: Shahjahanpur, Maihar gharana, and Senia Bangash (Gwalior), under his father and guru Pt. Alok Lahiri. He primarily belongs to the Maihar gharana. He is a TOP GRADE artist of All India Radio, Prasar Bharati and is widely regarded as one of best Sarod players from India currently performing

== Career ==
Abhisek began performing in public at age 11. His first significant national recognition came in 1997 when Hariprasad Chaurasia invited him to perform at the "Saath Saath Festival". That same year, he made his international debut in the Netherlands at the World Kinder Festival, where he was hailed as a 'Wonder Kid'. This accolade led to performances across Europe, the U.K., the U.S., Canada, Sri Lanka, Japan, Bangladesh, and Singapore. Abhisek also performed with his father, becoming the first Indian artists at the European Parliament in France, the Cannes World Music Festival, and at Canada Culture Days in Toronto.

Abhisek formed a world music trio named IONAH with Japanese guitarist Hideaki Tsuji and Indian tabla player Parimal Chakrabarty. He is also part of the EMME collective (East Meets Middle East) of Chicago, USA.

In 2017, the Indian Council for Cultural Relations appointed Abhisek as a Cultural Delegate to Morocco and Cyprus. His music albums gained recognition; "Sparkling Sarod" was nominated at the Global Indian Music Academy (GiMA) Awards in 2010, and in 2014, his album "Mood Of Puriya Kalyan" was nominated alongside Indian music legends such as Hariprasad Chaurasia, Shivkumar Sharma, Zakir Hussain, and Rashid Khan.

== Recognition ==
- Nominated twice for Global Indian Music Awards (GiMA) as best Hindustani Classical Album – Instrumental
- Anun Lund Rej Memorial Award from the Norwegian Consulate
- Certificate of Appreciation from Rotary International Club & Lions Club – Toronto
- The Telegraph School Award as an outstanding talent in Eastern Classical Music, presented by Chief Minister of West Bengal
- President Award in Sarod through All India Radio (AIR) Music Competition
- Rashtriya Gaurav Award from New Delhi
- Ustad Afzallur Rahman Memorial Award from Brahmanberia, Bangladesh
- Empaneled member Artist of Indian Council for Cultural Relations (ICCR), New Delhi
- Sangeet Ratnakar & Sangeet Visharad from Sabrbharatiya Sangeet o Sanskriti Parishad
- Jadubhatta Purashkar from Salt Lake Cultural Association
- National Scholarship for outstanding performance in Sarod, from the Ministry of Human Resources & Development and Tourism & Culture, New Delhi
- Awarded TOP Grade from All India Radio, Prasar Bharati New Delhi.

== Major performances ==
- Darbar Festival, London
- Sacred Music Festival, Strasbourg
- European Parliament, France
- Canada Culture Days, Hamilton
- World Music Day Festival, Cannes
- Théâtre de la Ville, France
- Tropen Theatre, Amsterdam
- RASA Theatre, Utrecht
- Musée Guimet, Paris
- India Night Festival, Stuttgart
- FIMU Festival, Belfort
- Raag-Mala Music Society, Edmonton and Calgary
- Virasat Foundation, Surrey
- TSS Multicultural Festival, Toronto
- The Malhar Group Spring Fest, Hamilton
- Shilpakala Academy & Alliance Francaise de Dhaka, Dhaka
- India Culture Centre, Tokyo
- International Classical Guitar Festival
- Hamamatsu Museum of Musical Instruments, Japan
- University of Victoria, Vancouver
- Eye on India Festival, Chicago
- Indian Music Society of Minnesota, Minneapolis
- Basant Bahar, San Francisco Bay Area
- Sangitabhimana Festival – Colombo, Sri Lanka
- Rialto Festival, Cyprus
- Vollubillis International Festival, Morocco
- Sifas Festival, Singapore
- Saath-Saath Festival, Mumbai
- RIMPA Festival (Ravi Shankar Institute), New Delhi
- All India Radio Music Festival, Shimla
- Dover Lane Music Conference, Kolkata
- Harivallabh Sangeet Sammelan, Jalandhar
- Ramakrishna Mission Institute of Culture in Golpark, Kolkata
- Sangeet Natak Academy Sangeet Pratibha Festival, Gwalior
- National Center for Performing Arts (NCPA), Mumbai
- Biswa Banga Sammelan, West Bengal
- Basanta Utsav in Jorasanko Thakurbari, Kolkata
- Saptak Music Festival, Nasik
- West Bengal State Music Academy Annual Concert, Kolkata
- India Habitat Centre in New Delhi
- Jnana Pravaha Music Festival, Kolkata
- Arohi Music Festival, Mumbai
- Isha Yaksha Festival, Coimbatore
- Anirban Sangeet Sammelan, Kolkata
- Saltlake City Music Festival, Kolkata
- Ballygunj Maitreyi Music Circle, Kolkata
- Paramparik Music Festival, Kolkata
- Sangeet Piyasi, Kolkata
- Swaramayee Gurukul, Pune
- Bhairav Kalyan Utsav ’05 & Smriti Utsav '09, Mumbai
- Kalibari Music Festival, Lucknow
- Music Festival, Assam and Tripura
- Cultural Music Conference. Allahabad
- Sangit Parishad Kashi, Varanasi
- Ustad Rahimat Khan Sangeet Samaroh, Dharwad
- Ustad Rajjab Ali Khan Sangeet, Dewas
- Dr Arun Kumar Sen Smriti Samaroh, Raipur

== Albums ==
- Sparkling Sarod
- Mood of Puriya Kalyan
- Genius of Sarod
- Rhythm Redefined
- Musical Sojourn
- Parampara
- Ionah Trio
