= Shashank Subramanyam =

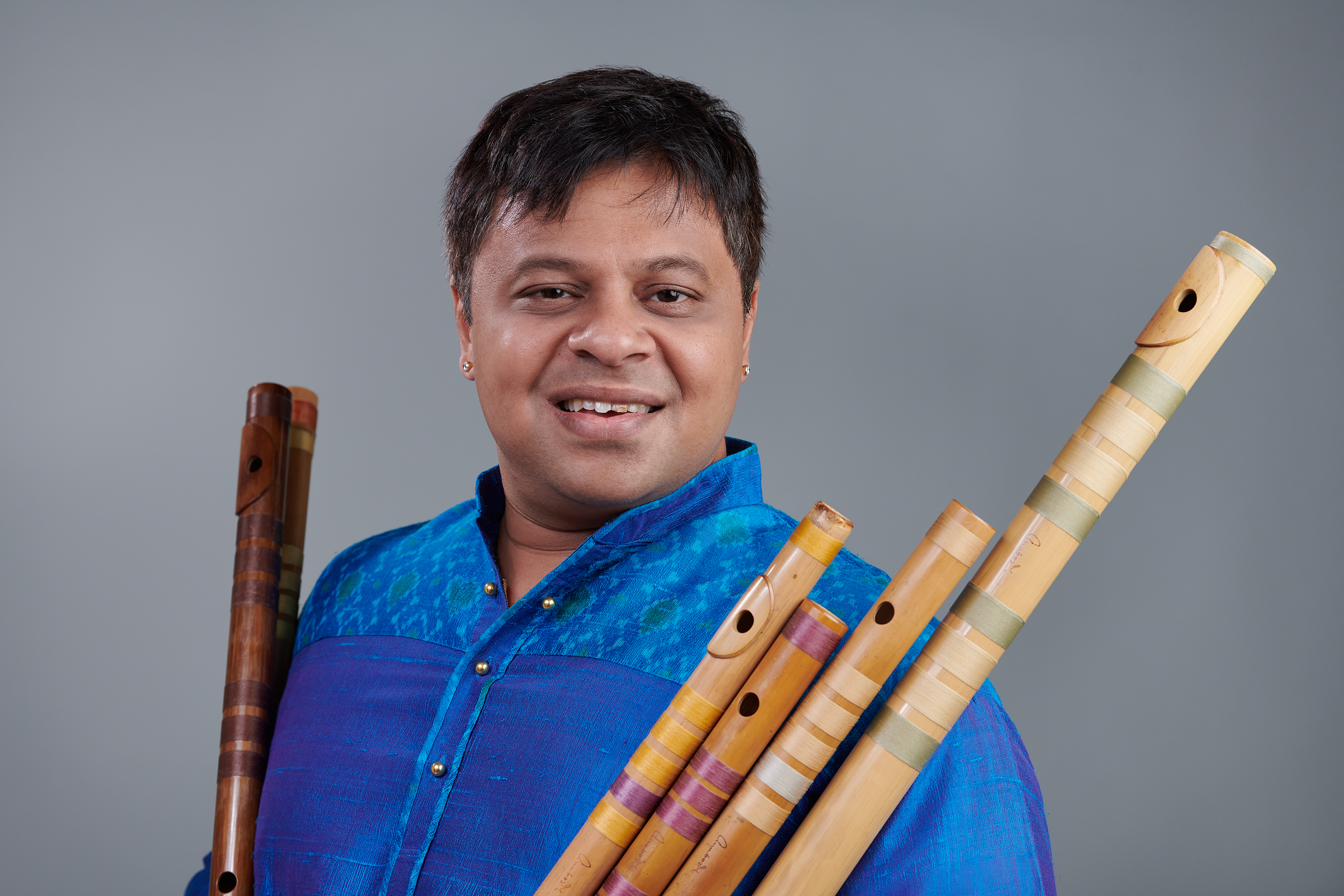
- Shashank Subramanyam

Background information
- Born: Shashank Subramanyam; October 14, 1978 (age 48); Rudrapatna, Karnataka, India
- Genres: Carnatic music, World music
- Occupation: Flautist
- Instruments: Bamboo flute (Carnatic flute, bansuri)
- Years active: 1984–present
- Website: www.shashank.org

Shashank Subramanyam (born 14 October 1978) is an Indian Carnatic flautist. A child prodigy, he began performing publicly at the age of six in 1984 and became the youngest musician to perform in the senior concert slot at the Music Academy, Chennai, in 1991. He has performed internationally as a soloist and has collaborated with musicians from Indian classical, jazz and world music traditions.

== Career ==
Shashank Subramanyam, born to Hemalata and Subramanyam, has ancestral roots in Tirunelveli, Tamil Nadu. His initial days were at Bangalore, he was initiated into Carnatic Music by his father Subramanyam, who trained him in basics of Carnatic Music. He later had advanced training under the Vocal doyen Palghat K.V. Narayanaswamy. He also studied Hindustani Music under the legend Pandit Jasraj.

He gave his first public performance in 1984 at the age of six. In 1989, Shashank had his International debut with performances in Adelaide, Melbourne, Sydney, Canberra, Singapore and Kuala Lumpur. Major media houses ABC radio, Adelaide Times, Straight times hailed Shashank's performances and published feature articles and reviews.

His career defining moment was on January 1, 1991, when the prestigious The Music Academy invited Shashank, aged twelve, to perform in the senior performance slot of the Academy, becoming the youngest artist in the history to perform at the senior slot.

Shashank became a regular performer in festivals, including major events across India like NCPA, Shanmukhananda Hall, Saptak-Ahmedabad, Sawai Gandharva - Pune, Dover Lane, Krishna Gana Sabha, Chowdiah Hall, Harivallabh Festival. He has also performed for several Presidents of India since 1992 at Rashtrapathi Bhavan, New Delhi.

Considered a legend of the Flute with contributions in the area of finger techniques, interpretation of Carnatic Music, co-creating "Shashank style of Flute". Apart from his contributions to Carnatic Music, Shashank is hugely known for his contributions to collaborative Music with North Indian musicians. His collaborations have been with musicians including Ustad Zakir Hussain, Pandit Jasraj, Ustad Shahid Parvez, Shujat Khan, Ajoy Chakraborthy, Rakesh Chaurasia, etc.

His International collaborations include John McLaughlin, Paco De Lucia, New Jungle Orchestra, Leipzig Philharmonic Orchestra, Wuppertal Symphony Orchestra, Persian musicians including the renowned Setar player Kiya Tabassian, Afghan Rubab player Homayoun Sakhi, Accordion player Lelo Nika, pianist Mike Herting, among many other musicians and bands.

He has presented performances, lecture demonstrations and workshops in major venues, conservatories and Universities. Barbican Hall, Theater De La Ville - Paris, Kennedy Center, Across Fukuoka, Esplanade - Singapore, Fes Festival - Moroco, Skopje Jazz Festival - Macedonia, Copenhagen Jazz Festival are noteworthy.

He appeared on John McLaughlin's album Floating Point, which received a nomination for "Best Contemporary Jazz Album" at the 51st Annual Grammy Awards.

His performances have been featured by BBC World Television in Destination Music and by CNN International on Travel Logue India.

Apart from public performances, Shashank strongly believed in sharing Music with school children and university students exposing them to the rich tradition of Indian music. He has presented over 1000 concerts and lecture demonstrations for school children across all states of India and in Europe.

== Honours ==
Shashank received the Sangeet Natak Akademi Award from Govt of India for 2017.

In 2022, the Government of France appointed him a Chevalier of the Ordre des Arts et des Lettres.

He is also a recipient of the Kalaimamani Award from the Government of Tamil Nadu in 2001.

In 2009, Shashank received a Grammy Nomination for the album Floating Point featuring Guitarist John McLaughlin, Shankar Mahadevan, Sivamani and other in the category of Best Contemporary Jazz Performance, Instrumental (later renamed Best Contemporary Jazz Album).
