= Sunanda Sharma (singer) =

Indian classical singer (born 1969)

Vidushi Sunanda Sharma
- Born: 22 October 1969 (age 57)
- Known for: Classical singer
- Website: https://sunandasharma.com/

Sunanda Sharma (born 22 October 1969) is an Indian classical singer. She performs across multiple genres and styles – khyal, thumri, dadra, chaitis, and kajris.

== Early life ==
Sunanda was born in a musical family in Dah a small village of Distt Kangra, Himachal Pradesh, India. Her father, Sudarshan Sharma, who was an Indian classical violinist, inspired her to learn Indian classical music.

As a teenager, Sunanda lived in Himachal Pradesh, and after finishing school, attended Punjab University, Chandigarh.

== Training ==
Sunanda began training on the veena with her father Sudarshan Sharma at the age of four and began performances from the age of nine. She was identified as a promising artist by Girija Devi, during her performance in Jalandhar (Punjab, India) at Hariballabh Sangeet Sammela, and under her tutelage she enriched her skills by learning vocal nuances from eminent legends like Kishan Maharaj and Bismillah Khan in a guru–shishya tradition style.

== Career ==
Over the span of her musical career, Sunanda has frequently been invited to perform for benefit concerts around the world.

=== India ===
- Thumri Festival, New Delhi and Mumbai
- Tansen Sangeet Sammelan, Gwalior
- Sangeet Natak Academy Concerts, Allahabad and Lucknow
- Concert at Prayag Sangeet Samiti, Allahabad
- Concert at Pracheen Kala Kendra, Chandigarh
- Pancham Nishad concert, Mumbai
- Concert "Musical Journey from India to Norway", New Delhi
- Morning ragas concert, Sangeet Natak Academy, New Delhi
- Kumbh Mela, Prayagraj (2019)
- Raymond MTV "Music Summit", Jaipur (2019)
- Concert at Stein Auditorium, India Habitat Centre, New Delhi (2019)
- Concert of Music and Kathak Dance with Padma Shri Shovana Narayan (2019)
- Basant Concert at Lady Shri Ram College Alumni (ELSA), Delhi (2020)
- Concert at National Centre for Performing Arts (NCPA), Mumbai (2020)

=== International ===
- World Voice Festival, Düsseldorf, Germany (2002)
- Annual Asian Music Circuit summer Concerts, U.K. (2000–2019)
- Concerts at Theatre Da La Ville, Paris, France (2015) (2019)
- Concerts at Cadogan Hall, London (2017) (2018)
- Concert at Fondazione Giorgio Cini, Italy (2018)
- Concert at Norwegian Parliament in Norway (2019)
- Concert at Festival of India, South Africa (2019)
- Concert at Fondazione Giorgio Cini, Venice Italy (2020)

== Solo albums ==
Her first solo album "Dharohar" released in 2000 by Time Music, later on, "Swar Sanchay" released in 2003 by Virgin Records, and "Sur Ganga" released in 2014 by Times Music.
