= Kushal Das =

Indian sitar and surbahar player (born 1959)

Pandit Kushal Das
- Born: Kushal Das; 20 August 1959 (age 67); Kolkata, West Bengal, India
- Occupation: Musician
- Musical career
- Genres: Hindustani classical music
- Instruments: Sitar; Surbahar
- Years active: 1970s–present
- Label: Ocora

Kushal Das (born 1959) is an Indian sitar and surbahar player. Hailing from a musical family based in Kolkata, he is widely regarded as one of the leading virtuosos of Hindustani classical music. He belongs to the Maihar gharana tradition and was awarded the Sangeet Natak Akademi Award in 2020 for his contributions to classical music.
