= Rakesh Chaurasia =

Indian flautist

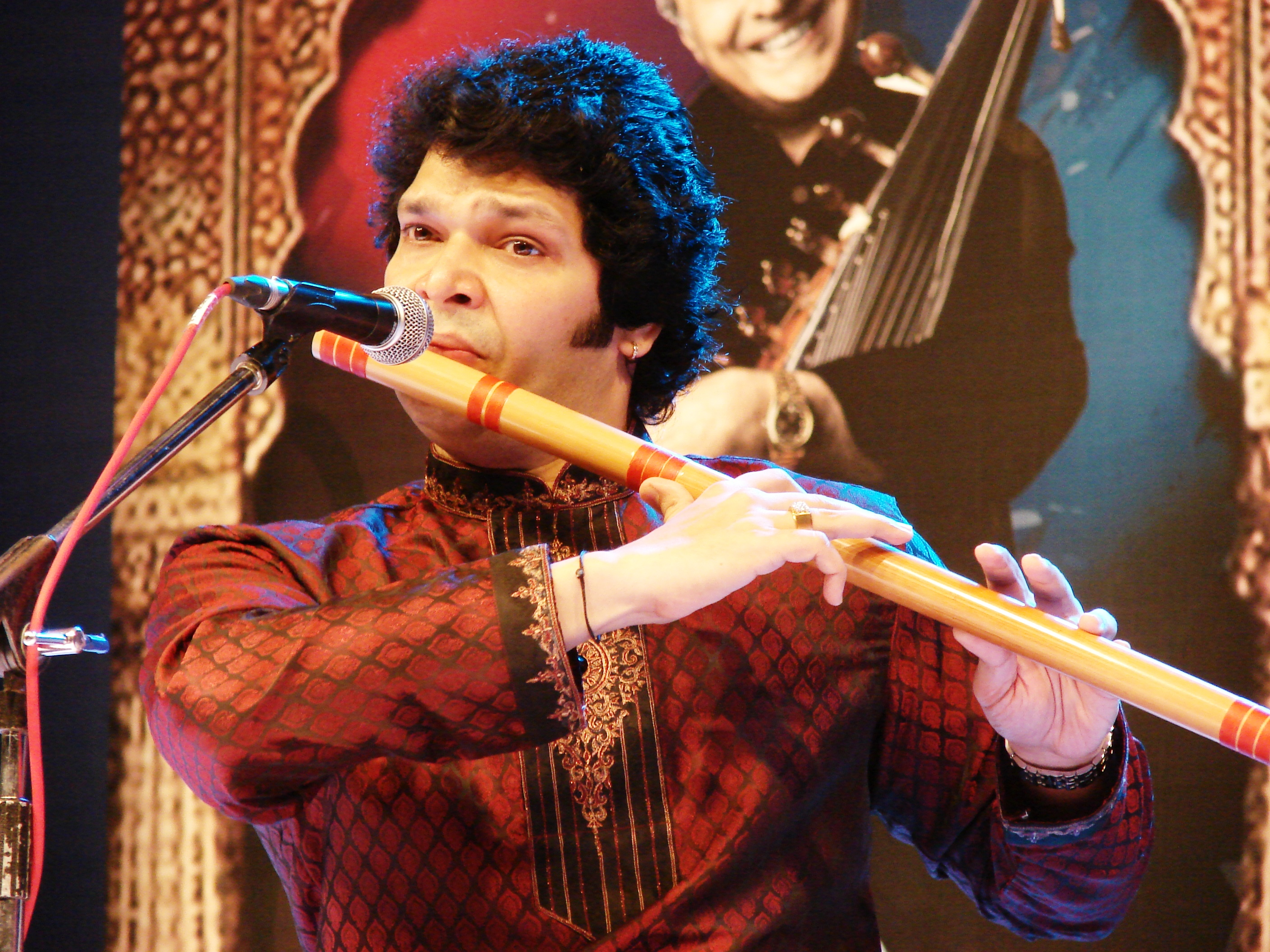
- Rakesh Chaurasia at Pune

Background information
- Born: 13 January 1971 (age 55); Allahabad, Uttar Pradesh, India
- Genre: Hindustani classical music
- Occupation: Flautist
- Instrument: Bansuri
- Website: www.rakeshchaurasia.com

Rakesh Chaurasia (born 10 January 1971) is an Indian flutist, who plays the bansuri, an Indian bamboo flute. He is the nephew of flautist Pt. Hariprasad Chaurasia.

He was awarded 'Indian of the Year 2017.'

Chaurasia has played and toured extensively with fellow musicians Béla Fleck, Edgar Meyer, and Zakir Hussain, and was featured on Fleck's album As We Speak, which was nominated for a Grammy award in the Best Instrumental Composition category, but instead won for Best Contemporary Instrumental Album in 2024. The track "Pashto" from the album also won in the category Best Global Music Performance.

He helped Dhafer Youssef arrange Street of Minarets, released in 2023, from material recorded a decade earlier at Sunset Sound in Los Angeles, adding performances on several tracks including "Ondes of Chakras".

He also performs frequently in SPIC MACAY Concerts throughout India.

== Discography ==
- Call of Krishna – 2003
- Call of Krishna 2 – 2005
- Dor – 2006
- Call of Shiva – 2007
- Call of the Divine – 2013
- Finesse on flute – 2019 (with Mukundraj Deo on tabla)
- ZaRa – 2022 (with Zakir Hussain)
- Rupak Kulkarni and Rakesh Chaurasia – Raga Kirwani
- Talvin Singh and Rakesh Chaurasia – Vira (2002), Sona Rupa UK/Navras Records
- Abhijit Pohankar and Rakesh Chaurasia – Tranquility (2001), Sona Rupa Records

== Awards ==
- Indian Music Academy Award – 2007
- Aditya Birla Kalakiran Purasakar – 2008
- Guru Shishya Award – 2011
- IWAP-Pandir Jasraj Sangeet Ratna Award – 2013
- Pannala Ghosh Puraskar – 2013
- Grammy Award in the category of Best Contemporary Instrumental Album for Pashto in the year 2024.
- Grammy Awards in the category of Best Global Music Performance for As we speak in the year 2024.
