= Neyveli Santhanagopalan =

Carnatic music singer

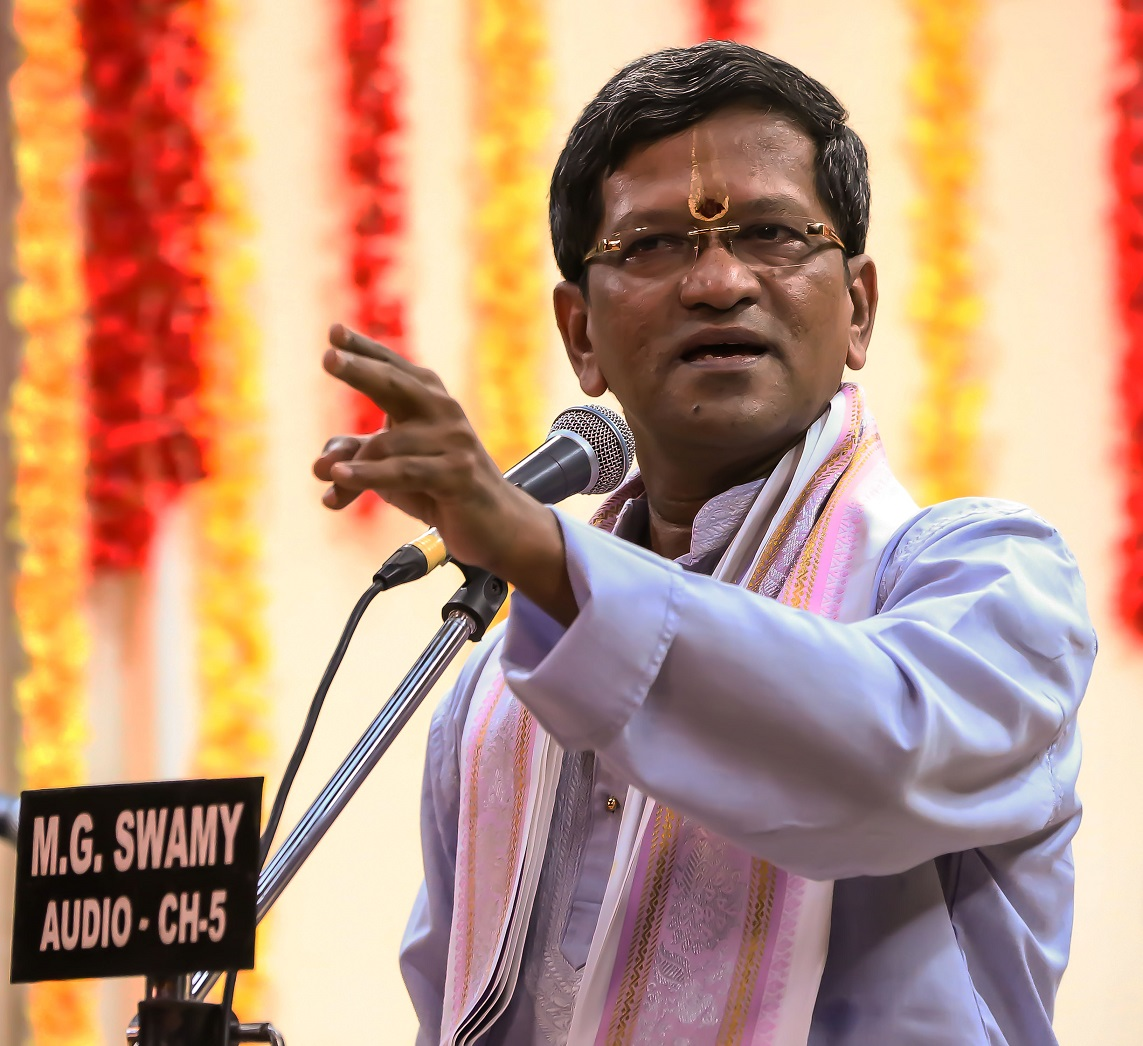
- Neyveli Santhanagopalan
- Born: 1963 (age 62–63)
- Citizenship: India
- Occupation: Carnatic vocalist

Neyveli Santhanagopalan (born 1963) is an Indian Carnatic vocalist and teacher. He was awarded the Madras Music Academy's Sangeetha Kalanidhi for the year 2020. He has learned from masters such as Shri Thanjavur Sankara Iyer, Shri Maharajapuram Santhanam, and Shri TN Seshagopalan.

He has distinguished himself with numerous concerts worldwide, and is the recipient of several awards in India and overseas. He is known for his traditional and purist style of rendering ragas, musical compositions and swaras. Currently, Santhanagopalan anchors for the Jaya TV program "SaRiGaMaPa". His daughter Sriranjani Santhanagopalan is a vocalist. He is a teacher, and his daughter helps him teach several students.

== Style ==
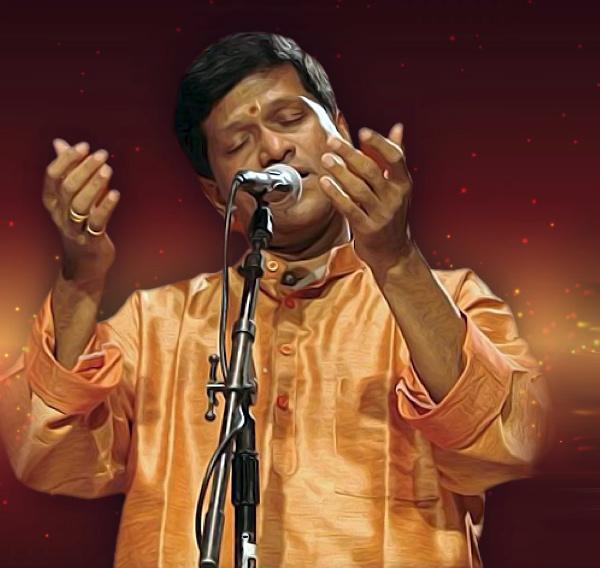
Neyveli Santhanagopalan singing in a concert

Santhanagopalan's style is distinguished by his adherence to strict raga interpretation, especially in his rigorous manodharma (creative interpretation) and raga sancharams (bringing out the essential elements or qualities of a raga). His conformity and respect for the traditional approach to carnatic vocal music is often reflected by the orthodox nature of his concert attire (the panchagacham and namam).

Santhanagopalan has been acknowledged for his emphasis on purity of nada and tone, and his restrained and measured grasp of kritis is regarded well with the Carnatic musical fraternity. Being a thinking man's musician, his cerebral, methodical approach to raga delineation reflects his own growth in music.

He is a regular and sought-after performer during the December and January Madras "Music Season", and his concerts have consistently sold out in such prestigious venues as Madras Music Academy, Krishna Gana Sabha, Mylapore Fine Arts, and Narada Gana Sabha. He is also a Grade 'A Top' artist with All India Radio and Doordarshan.

== Awards ==
- Santhanagopalan is a recipient of the Vani Kala Sudhakara of the Sri Thyaga Brahma Gana Sabha.
- Received awards and felicitations from Bharat Kalachar, Kartik Fine Arts and the Maharajapuram Viswanatha Iyer Foundation.
- Received the title "Vidhya Tapasvi" by TAPAS Cultural Foundation in 2008
- Awarded the Sangeet Natak Akademi Award in 2014.
- Recipient of the Sangeetha Kalanidhi award for the year 2020 by The Madras Music Academy.
- Kalaimamani Award - 2011

== Other interests ==
Santhanagopalan is also proficient in the Indian veena and percussion instruments. He has made contributions to the field of Carnatic musicology. In addition, Santhanagopalan also regularly contributes to philanthropic causes as was evidenced by his collection from US Benefit concerts as part of the 2005 Tsunami Relief.
