= Idea Jalsa =

- Genre: Indian classical music
- Presented by: Durga Jasraj; Annu Kapoor
- Country of origin: India
- Original language: Hindi

Production
- Production location: Mumbai
- Running time: 50 minutes

Original release
- Network: Zee TV

Idea Jalsa is a music reality series on Indian classical music aired on Zee TV. It is hosted by TV anchor Durga Jasraj and Annu Kapoor.

== History ==
Idea Jalsa a brainchild of Durga Jasraj and Vikram Shankar, started on 17 February 2006, inaugurated by the late President of Indian, Dr. A P J Abdul Kalam. In 2008, idea jalsa became a morning music show on Doorddarshan. In 2011, Zee TV picked up the series, and in 2012, Zee TV USA picked up the series and is now aired in 165 countries.

== The Show ==
Idea Jalsa is a national platform for talented youngsters, who get an opportunity to interact and share the stage with maestros and facilities for advance training. The show was organised across India by holding concerts in 12 cities.

It was also aired on regional channels of Doordarshan after its success.

== Episodes ==
- Episode 1: Shivkumar Sharma
- Episode 2: Munnawar Masoom & Mohd. Vakil
- Episode 3: Shankar Mahadevan
- Episode 211: Jagjit Singh
