= National Indian Music Competition =

The National Indian Music Competition (NIMC) is one of the three national music competitions organised by the National Arts Council in Singapore. First organised in 1998, the Competition has the following main aims:

- Develop the performing skills of musicians in Singapore
- Improve musical standards
- Identify potential music talents

In addition, the Competition aims to be a platform for musical excellence, providing young musicians with opportunities to perform in a competitive situation in front of an international jury. The competition is open to all Singapore citizens and permanent residents.

== National Indian Music Competition 2014 ==
The 2014 NIMC will be held from 16 to 22 June 2014 at the SOTA Drama Theatre. The competition comprises 8 solo categories. Participants may take part in these various solo instrumental categories – Carnatic Vocal, Hindustani Vocal, Veena, Violin, Flute, Mridangam, Sitar and Tabla.

Each solo instrument category is divided into three age categories:

- Open (30 years and below)
- Intermediate (18 years and below)
- Junior (12 years and below)

== Past Competition Winners ==
2011

Category	Prize	Junior	Intermediate	Open
Carnatic Vocal	1st	Meenakshy Jyothish	Nishanth Thiagarajan	n/a
	2nd	Gayathri Krishnakumar	Ganesh Balasubramanian	n/a
	3rd	Sandhya R	Sriram Balasubramanian & Aarthi Devarajan	n/a
Violin	1st	n/a	Sharanya	n/a
	2nd	Surup Sowmithri Thathachar	Ramesh Priyadharshini	n/a
	3rd	Vimalapugazhan Purushothaman	Jyothilakshmy Kavitha	n/a
	HM*	n/a	Ashwin Venkatram	n/a
Veena	1st	n/a	G Visveswari	n/a
	2nd	Anjana Giridhar	Nishtha Anand	n/a
	3rd	Swathi Nachiar Manivannan	n/a	n/a
Flute	1st	n/a	Prajwal Srikanth	Raghavendran s/o Rajasekaran
	2nd	Saikrishna	Vibhu Bulusu	Prabu s/o Ramachandran
	3rd	n/a	P Niranjan	Xu Kai Xiang Rit
Mridangam	1st	n/a	Sriram Sivakumar	n/a
	2nd	Prasanna Venkateshwar	Shyama Pushpa Sadashiv	n/a
	3rd	Thilak Pandian	Jaiganesh Charan	n/a
Sitar	1st	n/a	Anantya Bhatnagar	n/a
	2nd	n/a	Sarthak Bhatnagar	n/a
	3rd	n/a	n/a	n/a
Tabla	1st	Vignesh Sankar Iyer	Thinagar s/o Nanoo Siva Das	Lalit Kumar Ganesh
	2nd	Vaishnav Muralidharan	Sivakumar Balakrishnan	n/a
	3rd	n/a	Hemanth Hariharan	n/a
	HM*	n/a	Abishek Srivastava	n/a

- HM - Honourable Mention. Awarded to deserving finalists.

2008

Category	Prize	Intermediate	Open
Carnatic Vocal	1st	G S Divya	Rashmi Balasubramanian
	2nd	R Shwethambari	Sandhya Ramaswamy
	3rd	n/a	Kavitha Jayaraman
	HM*	Nandhitha Gurunath Hari & Poonguzhali Purushothaman	Darshini d/o Yoganathan
Violin	1st	Sriram Sami	Srikanth Radhakrishnan
	2nd	K Sowndarya	n/a
	3rd	n/a	n/a
Veena	1st	n/a	Aparna Mahadevan
	2nd	n/a	Gautham Viswanadam Abhirami
	3rd	n/a	n/a
Flute	1st	n/a	n/a
	2nd	Vibhu Bulusu	n/a
	3rd	n/a	n/a
Mridangam	1st	n/a	n/a
	2nd	Akshay Alauddin Lenin	n/a
	3rd	n/a	n/a
Tabla	1st	Pradeep Adhokshaja	Tan Guo Jun Radha Govinda Dasa
	2nd	Thinagar s/o Nanoo Siva Das	K Jegatheessh
	3rd	n/a	n/a

- HM - Honourable Mention. Awarded to deserving finalists.

2006

Category	Prize	Intermediate	Open
Carnatic Vocal	1st	Radhakrishnan Srikanth	P B Madhavan
	2nd	Rashmi Balasubramanian	Sindhu Sundar
	3rd	Kadayam Suresh Kaushik	Sudarshan Narasimhan
Violin	1st	Radhakrishnan Srikanth	n/a
	2nd	Sriram Sami	n/a
	3rd	Shreya Gopi	Nandita Krishnaswamy
	HM*	n/a	Murali Bharatram
Veena	1st	Gautham Viswanadam Abhirami	Ramaswamy Sandhya
	2nd	Aiswarya Mahadevan	n/a
	3rd	n/a	n/a
Flute	1st	n/a	n/a
	2nd	n/a	n/a
	3rd	n/a	Deepthi Prabhakar
Sitar	1st	n/a	n/a
	2nd	n/a	n/a
	3rd	Rhea Chatterjea	Periya d/o Sundaram
Mridangam	1st	Sanjay Vanen	Sista Satish Chandra
	2nd	Ganesh Jayabal	Sudarshan Narasimhan
	3rd	Jayagowtham s/o K Annadurai	n/a
Tabla	1st	Tan Guo Jun Radha Govinda Dasa	n/a
	2nd	Jayanth Ganapathy	Shouri Veluri
	3rd	n/a	Sivanathan Jheevanesh & Varun Ramesh Mani

- HM - Honourable Mention. Awarded to deserving finalists.

2004

Category	Prize	Intermediate	Open
Carnatic Vocal	1st	Trishala Raj Shankar	Janani Ganesh
	2nd	Kadayam Suresh Kaushik	Sushma Somasekharan
	3rd	S. Avanthika	Padmanabhan Bindu Madhavan & Radhika Ramakrishnan
Violin	1st	Sandeep Ramachandran	Raghuraman Lavanya & Sneha Ramesh Mani
	2nd	Aishwarya Ramesh	n/a
	3rd	Praphulla Chandra	n/a
Veena	1st	Shenbagavalli Raman	Neela Sitaram
	2nd	n/a	n/a
	3rd	n/a	n/a
Sitar	1st	n/a	n/a
	2nd	Rhea Chatterjea	Sri Vijayakumar Naidu s/o Govinda Rajoo
	3rd	Keerthigar Perumal	Ong Ban Yong
Mridangam	1st	Sudarshan Narasimhan	Viknash s/o Balakirshnan
	2nd	Jayagowtham s/o K. Annadurai	Pathmanathan s/o Jaganathan
	3rd	Ganesh Jayabal	n/a
Tabla	1st	Kumaran s/o Sinniah	N. Sathis Kumar & Kamal s/o Sarwan Singh
	2nd	Veluri Shouri	n/a
	3rd	Jayanth G	Hari Sivakumar

2002

Category	Prize	Intermediate	Open
Carnatic Vocal	1st	Janani Ganesh	Aravind Ratnam Ganesh
	2nd	Sushma Somasekharan	Padmanabhan Bindu Madhavan
	3rd	Ganesh Venkataraman	Lavanya Balachandran
Violin	1st	Gangadharan Anirudhan	Nandakumar Narasimhan
	2nd	n/a	Kartik Balachandran
	3rd	Janani Ganesh	Sneha Ramesh Mani
Veena	1st	Ramaswamy Sandhya	n/a
	2nd	Saranya Seetharaman	Ramkumar Vasudevan
	3rd	Saraswathi D/O Lakshmanan	Anparasi Thirugnanam
Sitar	1st	n/a	Krsna Dasa Tan Guo Ming
	2nd	n/a	Gayatri D/O T P Subramaniam
	3rd	n/a	Vanitha D/O Buthmanaban

Other music competitions organised by the National Arts Council (Singapore) are the National Piano and Violin Competition and the National Chinese Music Competition.
