= Rupak Kulkarni =

Indian Bansuri player

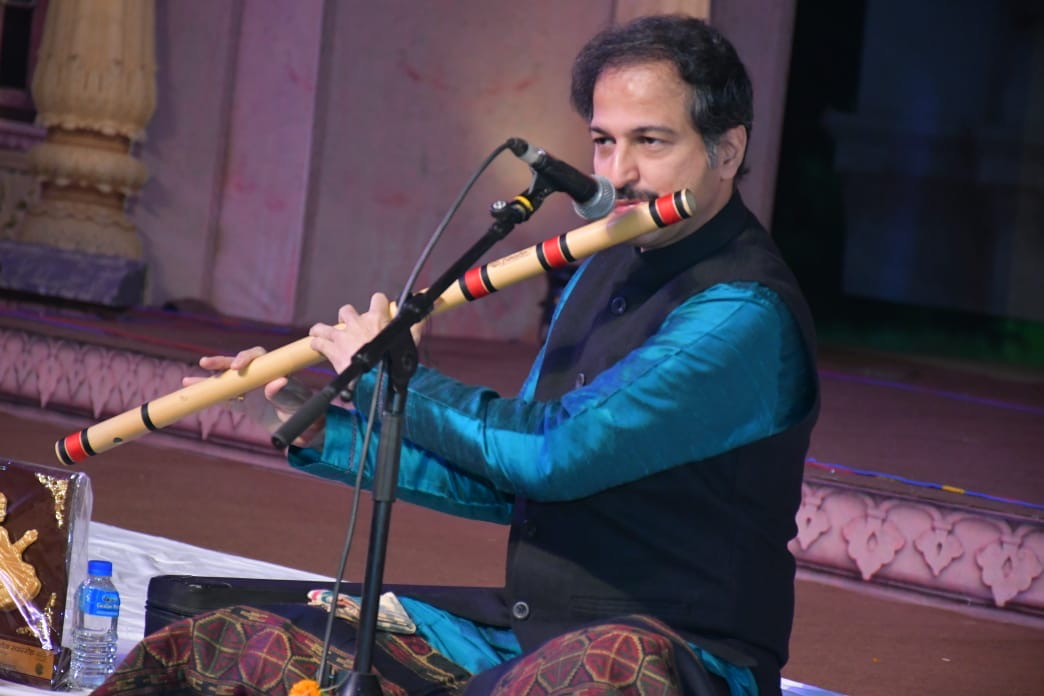

Background information
- Occupation: Instrumentalist
- Instrument: Bansuri
- Years active: 1970–present
- Website: www.fluterupakkulkarni.com

Rupak Kulkarni is an Indian Bansuri player.

== Background ==
With the musical background of his father Pt Malhar Rao Kulkarni, Rupak continued his learning under Padma Vibhushan Hariprasad Chaurasia to represent Maihar gharana.

== Performances ==
Rupak has performed at the Tansen Samaroh, Peshkar World Music Festival, Vishnu Digambar Paluskar Samaroh, Harballabh Sangeet Sammelan, Times of India 150 years celebration concerts, Bheeshm Parv (Pune), Ustad Amir Khan Samaroh, Sawai Gandharva Bhimsen Festival, Uttarpara Sangeet Chakra, Saptak Music Festival (Ahmedabad), Gunidas Sammelan, Hirabai Barodekar Smruti Samaroh, and Shruti Mandal.

His flute concerts are aired on All India Radio, World Space Radio and various TV channels such as Doordarshan, STAR TV, Zee TV, and CNN-IBN.

== Awards and achievements ==
- Pannhala Ghosh Award
- TOP Grade (All India Radio).
- ITC Artist of the month

== Discography ==
Pt Rupak Kulkarni's first album was released when he was 18, titled Tenderly, and he was accompanied by Anindo Chatterji on the tabla. Kulkarni's albums have been released by Times Music, His Master's Voice, Navras, Plus Music, Rhythm House, Ninaad, ABCL’s Big B, Sense World (London), WorldWideRecords etc.

- Trivenu (2017)
- Nature's Treasure (2016)
- Chakraview "Journey towards spirituality within" (WorldWideRecords)
- Shraddha - Devotional (Times Music)
- Divinity - Instrumental (Times Music)
- Music Albums (Indian Classical Music)
- The Flautist (His Master's Voice)
- Allure (RagaRang, USA)
- Draupadi "Five styles of Bansuri vadan" (Times Music)
- Learn to play flute (Gitanjali)
- Dharohar (Times Music)
- Tenderly (Rhythm House)
- Music Therapy for migraine (Times Music)
- De-Stress revive (Times Music)
- Music for sound sleep (Times Music)
- The Divine wheel (Sense World, London)
- Music Therapy for Diabetes (Times Music)
- Akansha (Ninaad)
- Garbhankur (Times Music)
- Sumadhur (Legendary Legacy)
- Unwind 1 & 2 – (Ninaad Music)
- Monsoon Magic (Plus Music)
- Drishti (Times Music)
- Trinity (Sona Rupa)
- Eternity (Times Music)
