= Ranjani–Gayatri =

Ranjani-Gayatri
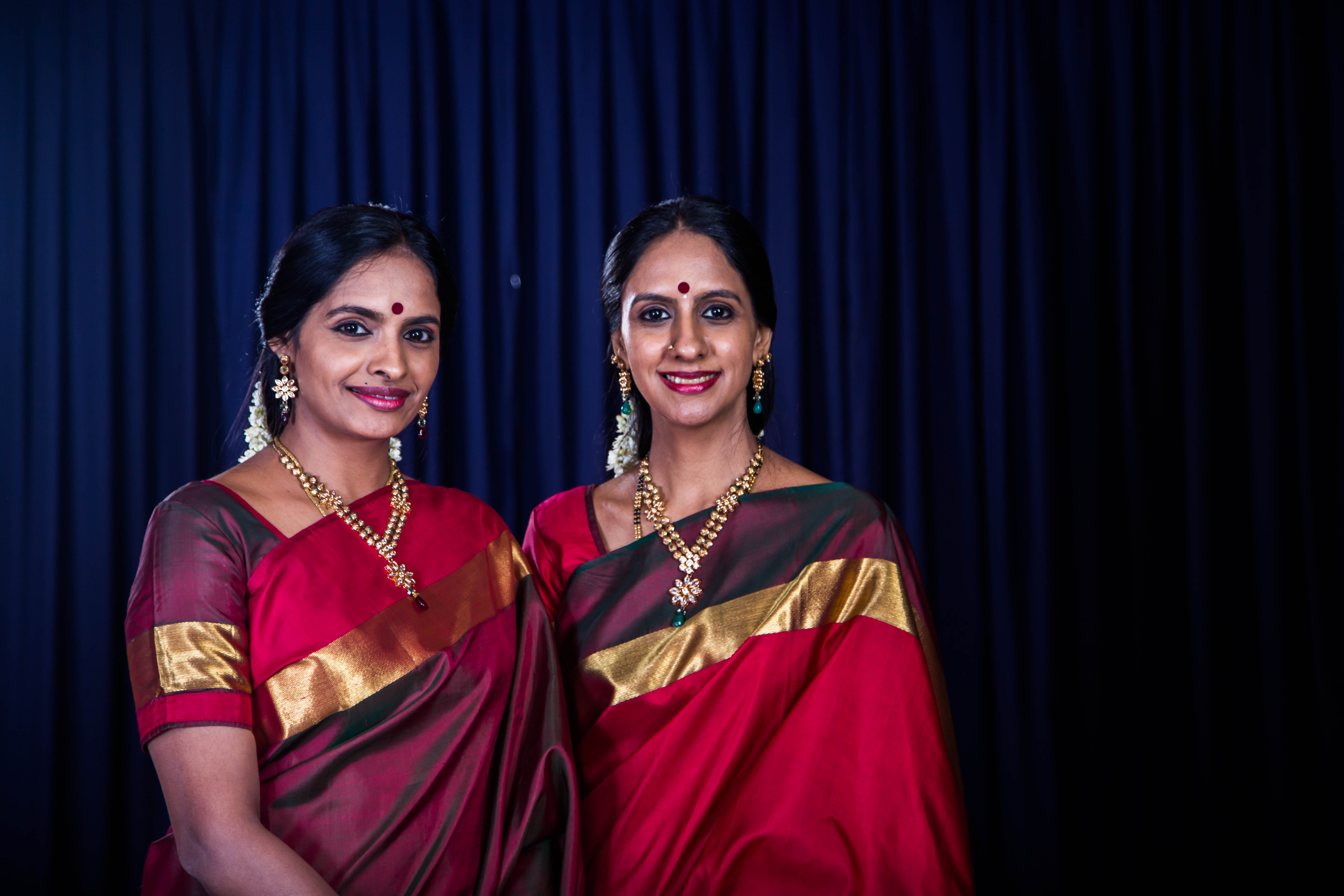

Background information
- Born: Ranjani: May 13, 1973 (age 53); Gayatri: May 10, 1976 (age 50)
- Origin: Mumbai, India
- Genre: Carnatic Music
- Occupation: Classical Vocalist
- Instruments: Vocals, Violin
- Award: Padma Shri (2026)
- Website: https://www.ranjanigayatri.com

Ranjani and Gayatri are two sisters from India who perform as a Carnatic vocal and violin duo. They have also appeared as soloists, accompanists, composers, and educators of Indian classical music. Their work includes studio recordings; television, radio, and festival appearances; live concerts; and lecture demonstrations.

== Early life ==
Ranjani and Gayatri were born to N. Balasubramanian and Meenakshi (a Carnatic vocalist as well). Born into a Tamil Brahmin family deeply involved in classical music, Ranjani and Gayatri's musical talents were discovered at a very early age. Gayatri could identify over a hundred ragas when she was barely two and a half and Ranjani could delineate complex rhythm patterns at age five. They started their violin training at the early age of nine and six respectively from Sangita Bhushanam Prof. T.S. Krishnaswami at the Shanmukhananda Sangeet Vidyalaya, Mumbai.

== As violin duet artists ==
Ranjani and Gayatri started their musical journey as violinists before they reached their teens, performing in sabhas (music organizations) around India and abroad. Besides playing the violin duet, they have also performed with musicians such as Smt.D.K.Pattammal, Sri M Balamurali Krishna, T.Vishwanathan.

== As vocal artists ==
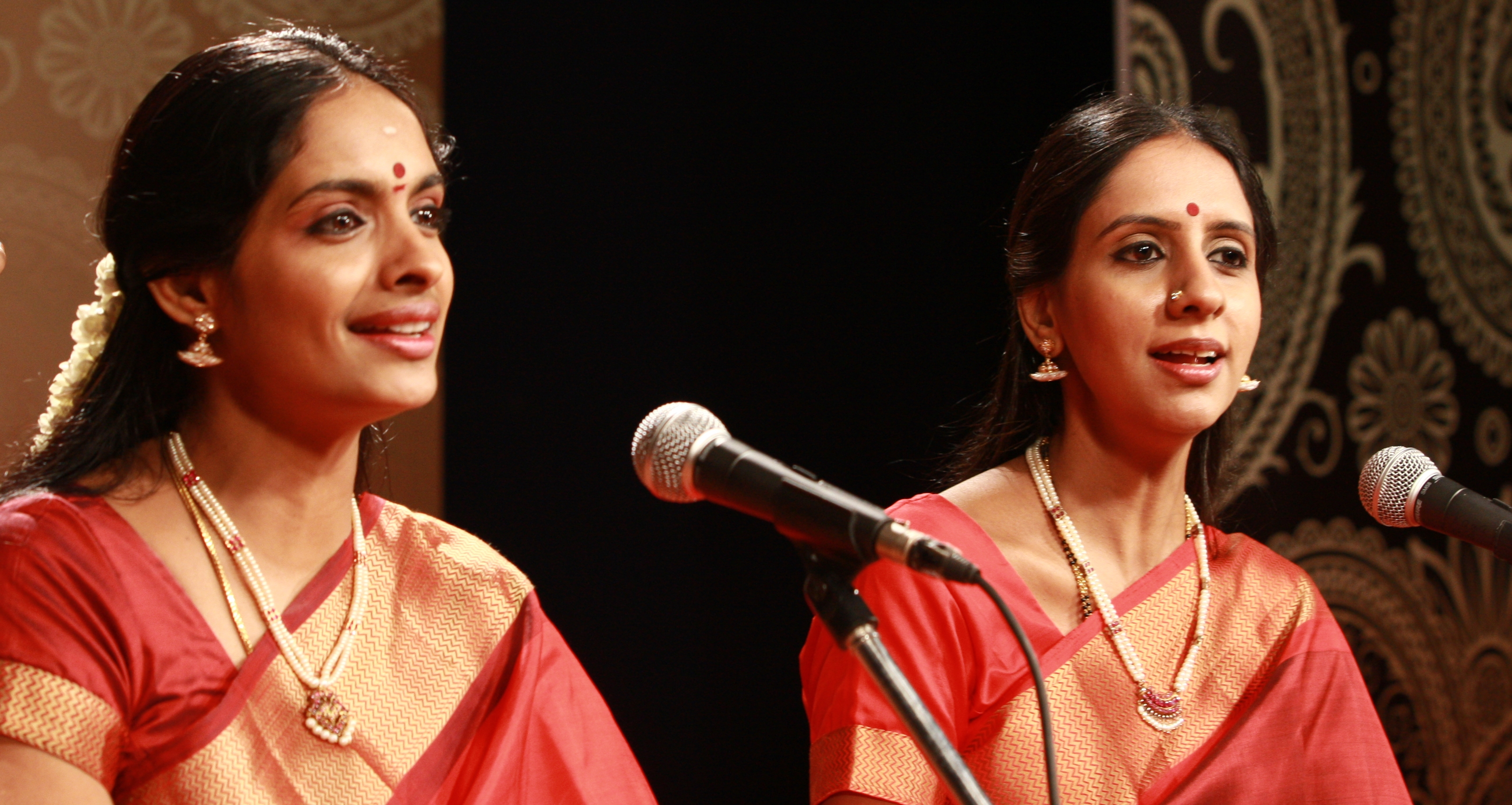
Ranjani-Gayatri Live Concert in 2011.

The sisters have given vocal concerts since 1997, after they became students of Padma Bhushan Sangeeta Kala Acharya P. S. Narayanaswamy. Ranjani and Gayatri perform songs in languages including Sanskrit, Telugu, Tamil, Kannada, Malayalam, Hindi, Marathi and Gujarati, in the genre of traditional "Carnatic" music.

== As composers ==
Ranjani and Gayatri also compose music. Most of the Abhangs they sing at the end of their concerts have been set to music by the sisters. They have also set many other thukkada pieces, including bhajans. Here is a list of some of the songs set by the sisters:

- Bolava Vitthala – Abhang (Sant Tukaram) – in Raga Bhatiyar.
- Pagaivanukkarulvai (Subramanya Bharathi) – Ragamalika
- Naachke Aaye – Bhajan (Ambujam Krishna) – in Raga Basant.
- Raam Naam Mhanata – Abhang (Tukaram) – in Raga Jhinjhoti
- Sharana Sharana – Abhang (Sant Tukaram) – in Raga Pilu.
- Dhanya Dhanya – Abhang (Sant Eknath) – in Raga Durga.
- Sada Majzhe – Abhang (Sant Tukaram) – in Raga Mishra Malkauns.
- Je Ka Ranzale - Abhang (Sant Tukaram) in Raga Bairagi
- Maajha ha Vitthal - Abhang ( Sant Janabai) in Raga Pilu
- Nirvana Shatkam of Adi Sankara in Raga Sohini
- Janmo Janmi - Abhang (Sant Eknath) in Raga Deshkar
- Mazaa Haa Vitthal - Abhang (Sant Janabai) in Raga Pilu
- Jaau Devachiya Gaava - Abhng (Sant Tukaram) in Raga Bhimplas
- Pandariche Bhoot Mote – Abhang (Sant Tukaram) – in Raga Chandrakauns/Surya.

== Awards ==
- Awarded Padma Shri in 2026 by the Government of India
- Received the Indira Sivasailam Endowment Medal from the Music Academy in 2016
- Received the title of Vani Kala Sudhakara from Thyaga Brahma Gana Sabha in 2015
- Sangeeta Kala Siromani Award from Chennai Cultural Academy in 2016
- Lifetime Achievement award from Bharatiya Vidya Bhavan in 2013
- Sanskriti Awards, instituted by Sanskriti Foundation, New Delhi in 2008 (recognising their contribution to the field of performing arts)
- Title of "Isai Peroli" from the Kartik Fine Arts, Chennai in Dec 2005.
- Kalki Krishnamurthi Memorial Award in 2004 (instituted by the Kalki trust in memory of the writer Sri. Kalki Krishnamurthy)
- Yogam Nagaswami Award of the Music Academy
- National Eminence Award (by the Shanmukhananda Sabha, Mumbai)
- Recipients of the Government of India Talent Search Scholarship at the age of ten.
- Winners of the First Prize in the All India Radio National Competition for Violin.

== Albums ==
Ranjani and Gayatri have various albums to their credit. Here is a list of some of the albums that have been released:

- Kurinji Malar (Live Concert)
- Anandam – Journey Into Bliss
- Un Thiruvadi Charanam (Live Concert)
- Paramanandam
- Pravaaham
- Rama Bhakti
- December Season 2001 Kutcheri (Live Concert)
- Madrasil Margazhi 2003 (Live Concert)
- Madrasil Margazhi 2004 (Live Concert)
- Madrasil Margazhi 2005 (Live Concert)
- Madrasil Margazhi 2006 (Live Concert)
- Madhuryam – Violin Duet
- Dual Harmony
- The Awakening (2000) - Ranjani–Gayatri's first vocal album
- Thendral
- Samaanam
- Saravanabhava
- Ambujam – Krithis of Ambujam Krishna (Live Concert)
- Paadaravindam (Live Concert)
- Kshetradanam
- Kutcheri 2010 (Live Concert)
- Kutcheri 2011 (Live Concert)
- Gems of Carnatic Music (Live in Concert 2004)
- Vaibhavam 2011 (Set of 4 concerts from December Music Season 2011)
- Vaibhavam 2012 (Set of 4 concerts from Dec music season 2012)
- Vaibhavam 2014 (Set of 4 concerts from Dec music season 2013)
- Vaibhavam 2017 (Set of 4 concerts from Dec music season 2016)
- Vaibhavam 2018 (Set of 4 concerts from Dec music season 2017)
- Kannan Thiruvadi ( Concert from Dec Music Season 2014)
- Vaibhavam 2019
- Vaibhavam 2020 (set from the Dec music season 2019)
- Ka Shanmuka ( Video of a live concert from a live concert during Dec music season 2015)
- Jaya Jayavanti ( Concert from Dec Music Season 2015)
