= Navarasa (soundtrack) =

2021 soundtrack album by various artists

Soundtrack album by A. R. Rahman, Santhosh Narayanan, Sundaramurthy KS, Rajesh Murugesan, Karthik, Ron Ethan Yohann, Govind Vasantha, Justin Prabhakaran and Vishal Bhardwaj
- Released: 16 July 2021
- Recorded: 2020–2021
- Genre: Netflix Original Series Soundtrack
- Length: 25:46
- Language: Tamil
- Label: Think Music
- Producers: Mani Ratnam; Jayendra Panchapakesan

A. R. Rahman chronology
Mimi (2021)	Navarasa (2021)	Cobra (2022)

Santhosh Narayanan chronology
Sarpatta Parambarai (2021)	Navarasa (2021)	Kasada Thapara (2021)

Sundaramurthy KS chronology
Pancharaaksharam (2019)	Navarasa (2021)	Jiivi 2 (2022)

Rajesh Murugesan chronology
Ninnila Ninnila (2021)	Navarasa (2021)	Vasantha Mullai (2021)

Karthik chronology
Kutty Story (2021)	Navarasa (2021)	Joshua: Imai Pol Kaakha (2024)

Ron Ethan Yohann chronology
Game Over (2019)	Navarasa (2021)	Vanam (2022)

Govind Vasantha chronology
Oru Pakka Kathai (2020)	Navarasa (2021)	Tughlaq Durbar (2021)

Justin Prabhakaran chronology
Paava Kadhaigal (2020)	Navarasa (2021)	Meenakshi Sundareshwar (2021)

Vishal Bhardwaj chronology
1232 KMS (2021)	Navarasa (2021)

Navarasa is the soundtrack album for the Netflix original series of the same name jointly created by Mani Ratnam and Jayendra Panchapakesan. The series consists of nine short films based on the nine Indian aesthetics and has music composed by A. R. Rahman, Santhosh Narayanan, Sundaramurthy KS, Rajesh Murugesan, Karthik, Ron Ethan Yohann, Govind Vasantha, Justin Prabhakaran and Vishal Bhardwaj.

== Overview ==
List of the composers working for their respective short films:

Title	Director	Music director
Edhiri (Karuna – Compassion)	Bejoy Nambiar	Govind Vasantha
Summer of '92 (Haasya – Laughter)	Priyadarshan	Rajesh Murugesan
Project Agni (Adbhutha – Wonder)	Karthick Naren	Ron Ethan Yohann
Payasam (Bibhatsa – Disgust)	Vasanth	Justin Prabhakaran
Peace (Shaantha – Peace)	Karthik Subbaraj	Santhosh Narayanan
Rowthiram (Raudra – Anger)	Aravind Swami	A. R. Rahman
Inmai (Bhayaanaka – Fear)	Rathindran R. Prasad	Vishal Bhardwaj
Thunindha Pinn (Veera – Valour)	Sarjun KM	Sundaramurthy KS
Guitar Kambi Mele Nindru (Shringaara – Romance)	Gautham Vasudev Menon	Karthik

== Production ==
The original soundtrack and score of Navarasa is composed by A. R. Rahman, Santhosh Narayanan, Sundaramurthy KS, Rajesh Murugesan, Karthik, Ron Ethan Yohann, Govind Vasantha and Justin Prabhakaran. Initially D. Imman, Ghibran and Aruldev, were signed in for the project, but since the directors of the respective anthologies left the project, Santhosh, Sundaramurthy and Rajesh took over the project. Vishal Bhardwaj made his debut in Tamil, composing for the segment Inmai directed by Rathindran R. Prasad.

As the series is based on the Indian concept or Navarasas (Indian aesthetics), each segment directed by five directors represent a different emotion or rasa such as anger, compassion, courage, disgust, fear, laughter, love, peace and wonder. The songs in the anthology segments scored by varied music directors also represent a different emotion. The music directors, along with the film artists, directors and other technicians, worked on the series without receiving any remuneration.

== Composition ==
Though multiple composers were being a part of the anthology, only nine songs were composed for the series. The episode Guitar Kambi Mele Nindru, featured five to seven songs scored by Karthik accompanied within the duration of 35–40 minutes. The tracks "Thooriga" is inspired from the song "Ninnukori Varnam" from Agni Natchathiram, composed by Ilaiyaraaja, and the first bit prelude of "Adhirudha" is inspired from "Für Elise", a composition for piano by German musician Ludwig van Beethoven, and Karthik played this song in guitar. After Sarjun being roped in for the anthology whose segment titled Thunindha Pinn, Sundaramurthy KS, who worked with Sarjun in the short films Lakshmi (2017), Maa (2018) and with the feature film Airaa (2019), was roped in for this segment, and composed two songs: "The Bleeding Heart (Osara Parandhu Vaa)" and "The Comrade Theme (Dhooramai Kanaa)" sung by Uday Kannan. Composers Govind Vasantha and Justin Prabhakaran had scored two tracks each for the series. The song "Kannunjal" is set in Anandabhairavi raga.

== Release ==
A. R. Rahman composed the theme music for the official teaser released on 9 July 2021. The theme features violin interlude, blended with classical instruments and also vocals accompanied by Nakul Abhyankar in the background. Think Music India released the theme song through streaming platforms the very same day, along with five other songs as singles, the first being "Thooriga" from the segment Guitar Kambi Mele Nindru which was composed and sung by Karthik and written by Madhan Karky. The second song titled "The Bleeding Heart (Osara Parandhu Vaa)" was recorded by Vrusha Balu of Super Singer Season 8 fame and composed by Sundaramurthy KS with lyrics penned by Soundararajan released on the same day. The full soundtrack was later released on 16 July 2021.

== Reception ==
Navarasa's soundtrack received mostly positive reviews from critics and audiences. Karthik Keramalu of Hindustan Times opined the album as "well composed" and rated the album 4 out of 5. Both the websites Behindwoods and Indiaglitz had stated that "Suriya's segment dominates the music playlist with truly enchanting music pieces by Karthik, which was the exciting one" but they wrote that "A. R. Rahman's 'Navarasa Title Theme' is the standout from the lot". Milliblog's Karthik Srinivasan wrote in its review for Navarasa title theme, saying "the sweep of the theme is indicative of the working relationship of Rahman and Mani Ratnam (Navarasa's producer) and how it still has that spark after almost 30 years!". In another review, Karthik stated that the songs "Thooriga" as "a great blending of a new song with an old, very familiar, and much-loved soul"; "Alai Alaiyaaga" as a "beautifully calm melody", "Yaadho" and "Kannunjal" as "better" in standards. Vipin Nair's review about the soundtrack in Music Aloud stated the album as "brilliant" giving a 3.5 out of 5 rating.

== Track listing ==
No.	Title	Lyrics	Music	Singer(s)	Length
1.	"Navarasa Title Theme"	Instrumental	A. R. Rahman	A. R. Rahman	2:31
2.	"Thooriga"	Madhan Karky	Karthik	Karthik	3:22
3.	"The Bleeding Heart – Osara Parandhu Vaa"	Soundararajan	Sundaramurthy KS	Vrusha Balu	3:15
4.	"Yaadho"	Madhan Karky	Govind Vasantha	Chinmayi	4:02
5.	"Kannunjal"	Uma Devi	Justin Prabhakaran	Sudha Raghunathan	3:22
6.	"Alai Alayaaga"	Madhan Karky	Karthik	Karthik	1:36
7.	"The Comrade Theme – Dhooramai Kanaa"	Soundararajan	Sundaramurthy KS	Uday Kannan	2:02
8.	"Naanum"	Madhan Karky	Karthik	Karthik	3:34
9.	"Adhirudha"	Madhan Karky	Karthik	Karthik	2:03
10.	"Navarasa Trailer Music"	Instrumental	Govind Vasantha	Govind Vasantha	2:51
Total length:					28:37

== Navarasa: The Symphony of Emotions ==
On 5 August 2021, a day before the official release of the series, Mani Ratnam and Jayendra Panchapakesan hosted a live music event for the series' promotions titled Navarasa: The Symphony of Emotions. Based on the Indian concepts of Navarasas, it was hosted by Dhivyadharshini and featured musical performances from artists all over the world, each artist represent different emotions through the numbers performed: anger, compassion, courage, disgust, fear, laughter, love, peace and wonder, and featured a live interaction between the artists, crew members and technicians working on the series. A fundraiser event, the artists performed live film music on stage, to support the technicains working on the Tamil music industry, who were affected by the COVID-19 pandemic. The ensemble artists performed in the songs were flautist Naveen Kumar, Viveick Rajagopalan, Abhishek Kumar, K.C. Loy, Piyush Rajani and The Fine Tuners, Mahesh Raghvan, Nandini Shankar, Shashaa Tirupati, Anantha Krishnan, Ricky Kej, Kunal Naik and A. R. Rahman's K. M. M. C. Choir.

=== Musical numbers ===
Rasa (Emotion)	Song	Composer(s)	Lyricist(s)	Primary artist(s)	Other artists
Adbhutha (Wonder)	"Adbhutha"	Naveen Kumar	—	Naveen Kumar (Wind instruments)	—
Bhayaanaka (Fear)	"Love You Forever"	Viveick Rajagopalan	K. C. Loy	K. C. Loy	Viveick Rajagopalan (Drums, Percussions, Highs)
Haasya (Laughter)	"Vidhiyum Vidhiyum Vilayaatu"	R. Madhana Prakash	Rahul Sridhar (Rap lyrics)	Abhishek Kumar (Rap vocals)	—
Shringaara (Romance)	"Carousel"	Mahesh Raghvan, Nandini Shankar	Shashaa Tirupati (English lyrics)	Mahesh Raghvan (Geoshred Sarangi), Nandini Shankar (Violin)	Shashaa Tirupati (Backing vocalist)
Veera (Valour)	"Veera"	Piyush Rajani, Sudesh Gaikwad (musical arrangement)	—	The Fine Tuners: Piyush Rajani, Rahul Shriskar, Prathamesh Dhumal, Krunal Barot, Roshan Kamble, Nagesh Surve, Hiten Purbiya	The Bboy Punks (Dance)
Karuna (Compassion)	"Karuna"	Ricky Kej, Vanil Vegas (musical arrangement)	—	Ricky Kej (Keyboard), Punya Srinivas (Veena), Rasika Shekhar (Flute & Female vocals), Sunil Shridhar (Male vocals) Vanil Vegas (Drums), Sunshine Orchestra	K. M. M. C. Choir
Bibhatsa (Disgust)	"Bibhatsa"	Dipanjan Guha	—	Kunal Naik	—
Raudra (Anger)	"Rowdhra"	Viveick Rajagopalan, Ananthakrrishnan	—	Viveick Rajagopalan, Ananthakrrishnan (Mridangam)	—
Shaantha (Peace)	"Naalai Nammudaiyadhu"	Prince Mulla, The Live 100 Experience	K. G. Ramanarayan, Prince Mulla	The Live 100 Experience	—

== Personnel ==
Credits adapted from Think Music

=== Composer(s) ===
- A. R. Rahman
- Santhosh Narayanan
- Sundaramurthy KS
- Rajesh Murugesan
- Karthik
- Ron Ethan Yohann
- Govind Vasantha
- Justin Prabhakaran
- Vishal Bhardwaj

=== Musician(s) ===
- Guitars: Keba Jeremiah, Joseph Vijay, Dhruv Vishwanath
- Ukulele: Keba Jeremiah
- Bass: Naveen Napier
- Keys: Hentry Kuruvilla, Ramesh Vinayakam
- Flute: Naveen Kumar, Kareem Kamalakar, Sathish
- Sarod: Sarang Kulkarni
- Sitar: Asad Khan
- Veena: Rajesh Vaidhya
- Solo Violin: Prabhakar, Vignesh
- Mandolin: Tapas Roy
- Cello: Balaji
- Drums: Sivamani, Rahul Muralidhar
- Nadaswaram: Thirumoorthy, Balasubramani
- Tavil: Rajinimurugan
- Pambai: Pazhani, Janardhan
- Rhythm: Buddhar Kalai Kuzhu

==== Orchestra ====
- Score conductors: Oleg Kontradenko, Dzijan Emin (Fame's Macedonian Symphonic Orchestra), V. J. Srinivasamurthy (Sunshine Orchestra), R. Prabhakar, Yensone Bhagyanathan, Kannan, Collins Rajenran (Chennai Strings Orchestra)
- Sound Engineer: Alen Hadzi Stefanov
- Protocol Operator: Koca Davicodenic, Igor Vasilev
- Stage Manager: Teodora Arsovska, Ilija Grkovski
- Orchestrator: Joaquim Badia
- Additional Orchestration: Neelesh Mandalapu
- India Orchestra Coordination: Andrew T. Mackay (for Bohemia Junction)
- Strings arrangement: Collins Rajendran

=== Backing vocalist(s) ===
- Arjun Chandy
- Veena Murali
- Deepthi Suresh
- Rakshita Suresh
- Maalavika Sundar
- Nakul Abhyankar
- Deepak
- Aravind Srinivas
- Hiral Viradia
- Madhumitha Shankar
- Jithin Raj
- Shenbagaraj
- Santosh Hariharan
- Vignesh Narayanan
- Yogi Sekar
- Lavita Lobo
- Madhura Dhara Talluri
- Akshara
- Vithusayni
- Sireesha Bhagavatula
- Narayanan
- Rohit Fernandes
- Pravin Saivi
- Britto Michael
- Chinna
- Sowmya Mahadevan

=== Sound Engineers ===
- Panchathan Record Inn, Chennai – Suresh Permal, Karthik Sekaran, T. R. Krishna Chetan, Hentry Kuruvilla, Nakul Abhyankar, Kumaran Sivamani
- AM Studios, Chennai – S. Sivakumar, Kannan Ganpat, Pradeep Menon, Krishnan Subramaniyan, Manoj Raman, Aravind MS
- KM Music Conservatory, Chennai – Aravind Crescendo
- Future Tense Studios, Chennai – Santhosh Narayanan, R. K. Sundar
- Resound India, Chennai – Sai Shravanam
- Offbeat Music Ventures, Chennai – Aswin George John
- Krimson Avenue Studios, Chennai – Sethu Thankachan, Vishnu Namboodhiri, Abin Pushpakaran, Balu Thankachan
- Threedots Film Studio, Kerala – M. T. Aditya Srinivasan
- 20db Sound Studios, Chennai – Avinash Satish
- Studio Satya, Mumbai – Salman Khan Afridi
- Abbey Road Studios, London – Christian Wright

=== Production ===
- Music Supervisors: T. R. Krishna Chetan, Sethu Thankachan, Nizammudeen, Abin Pushpakaran, Arvind Sridhar, Mayukh Sarkar
- Music Programmers: T. R. Krishna Chetan, Jerry Silvester Vincent, Pawan CH, Santosh Dayanidhi, Kumaran Sivamani, Jim Sathya, Nakul Abhyankar, Pradvay Sivashankar, Sethu Thankachan, Balu Thankachan, Nizammudeen, Sabin Jose, RK Sundar, Britto Michael, Chinna, Ganesh Kumar B
- Additional Programming: Pradvay Sivashankar, Prithvi Chandrashekhar, Avinash Satish
- Mixed by: T. R. Krishna Chetan, P. A. Deepak, Suresh Permal, Amith Bal, RK Sundar, Sai Shravanam, Balu Thankachan, Sabin Jose, Karthik, Aswin George John
- Mastered by: Suresh Permal, Abin Pushpakaran, Balu Thankachan, Nizammudeen, Sai Shravanam, Sreejesh Nair
- Mastered for iTunes: S. Sivakumar, Shadab Rayeen, Balu Thankachan
- Mixing assistance: Abhishek Sortey, Dhananjay Kapekar
- Musicians co-ordinators: T. M. Faizuddin, Abdul Haiyum Siddique, B. Velavan, Meenakshi Santhosh
- Musicians' fixer: R. Samidurai, B. Velavan
