= Swara Samrat festival =

Indian classical music festival

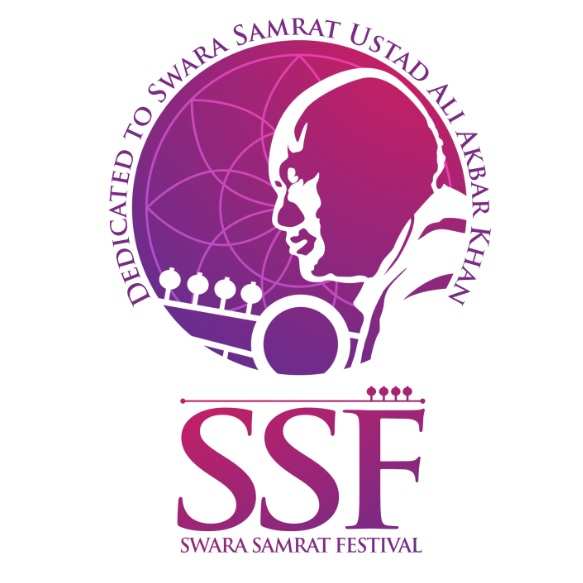
- Genre: Indian classical music & dance
- Location: Kolkata, India
- Years active: 2013–present
- Founders: Shree Ranjani Foundation Trust

Swara Samrat festival (also known as SSF) is a four-day annual festival of Indian classical music and dance held during the winters in Kolkata, India. This festival is the brainchild of Sarod maestro Padmashri Pandit Tejendra Narayan Majumdar, his vocalist wife, Manasi Majumder and their Sarod player-son Indrayuddh Majumder. The festival is dedicated to Swara Samrat Ustad Ali Akbar Khan. Indian Classical Music and Dance Legends such as Pandit Shivkumar Sharma, Pandit Jayanta Bose, Pandit Birju Maharaj, Pandit Hari Prasad Chaurasia, Legendary tabla player of Banares Gharana Pandit Kumar Bose, Pandit Jasraj, Ustad Zakir Hussain, Ustad Aashish Khan, Dr. Girija Devi, Begum Parveen Sultana, Pandit Swapan Chaudhuri, Guru Karaikudi Mani, Ustad Rashid Khan, Shankar Mahadevan, Pandit Budhaditya Mukherjee, Pandit Ulhas Kashalkar, Pandit Venkatesh Kumar, Pandit Ajoy Chakraborty, Pandit Anindo Chatterjee, Pandit Sanjay Mukherjee, Ustad Shahid Parvez, Ustad Shujaat Khan, Padmashri Pandit Tejendra Narayan Majumdar, Pandit Kushal Das, Pandit Rajendra Gangani, Guru Sujata Mohapatra, Pandit Subhankar Banerjee, Pandit Yogesh Samsi, Pandit Bickram Ghosh, Pandit Tanmoy Bose and Kaushiki Chakraborty are some of the artists who have previously performed in this festival.

== Background ==
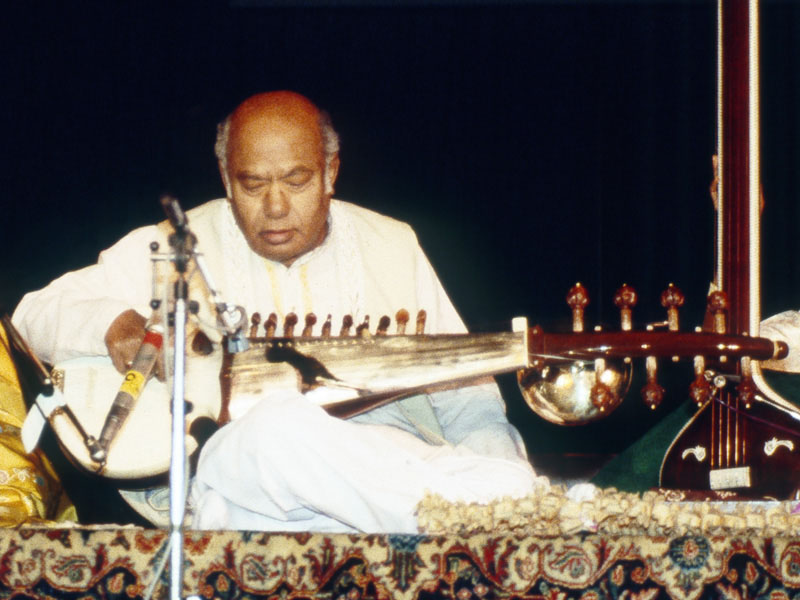
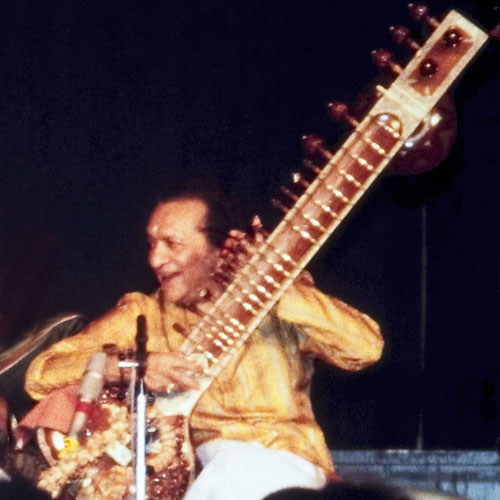
The festival was initially planned as an event to commemorate the 90th birth anniversary of Ali Akbar Khan (left), but after the death of Pandit Ravi Shankar the organizers decided to dedicate it to Ravi Shankar (right) too.

Swara Samrat festival started as a two-day festival of Indian classical music and dance on 5–6 January 2013, featuring Indian classical musicians and dancers before a 3500-plus audience each day at Nazrul Manch, Kolkata. The festival was initially planned to celebrate the 90th Birth Year of Swara Samrat Ustad Ali Akbar Khan (1922-2009). Bharat Ratna Pandit Ravi Shankar supported the event, but died 11 December 2012, just a month before the festival. After Ratna's death, Shree Ranjani Foundation Trust decided to dedicate this festival to the Sitar legend too. The Majumdars called this festival a dedication to "The Immortal Duo – Swara Samrat Ali Akbar Khan and Bharat Ratna Ravi Shankar". Both of them had learnt from the same guru and had performed duet concerts across the globe. The full house, performers and sponsors were overwhelmed by this grand gesture. Shree Ranjani Foundation Trust decided to continue the festival, which is now held every winter.

Tejendra Narayan has really worked hard to put this concert together. I have heard no one came forward to help him out, which is unfortunate. But such an effort will always be remembered.

— Aashish Khan

== Swara Samrat - The Title ==
Acharya Baba Ustad Allauddin Khan, who is regarded as one of the greatest saints of Indian classical music the 19th and 20th centuries and founded the Maihar Senia Gharana, had gifted his son Ali Akbar Khan, the title Swara Samrat (meaning Emperor of Melody).

== Swara Samrat Festival - Time Period ==
Initially Swara Samrat Festival was a two-day festival held in January/February of every year. But after the fourth season, which was held on 10 & 12 January 2016, SSF wanted to move the festival to December. The 2016 season was thus held in January, and the fifth season was in December. The festival currently is a four-day December event.

== SSF Lifetime Achievement Award ==
In 2018, SSF honored Janaab Abul Khair Litu (Chairman, Bengal Foundation, Bangladesh) with the SSF Lifetime Achievement Award for his enormous contribution to the propagation, promotion and facilitation of proper training of Indian Classical Music & Dance as well as other forms of Arts across Bangladesh.

In 2019–20, Pandit Vijay Kichlu, an eminent musician, musicologist, music producer and founder of ITC Sangeet Research Academy was honored with the SSF Lifetime Achievement Award for his lifelong contribution to the entire fraternity of Indian classical music and dance across India and abroad.

The city is the Mecca of classical music. Those like the Swara Samrat Festival are valuable additions in taking the tradition forward.

— Begum Parveen Sultana

=== Season 8 (1, 7 & 8 December 2019, and 13 February 2020) ===
Sources:

- Pt. Tejendra Narayan Majumdar (Sarod) & Ud. Zakir Hussain (Tabla)
- Pt. Ajoy Chakrabarty (Vocal) with Sandip Ghosh (Tabla) & Pt. Ajay Joglekar (Harmonium)
- Pt. Kumar Bose (Tabla Solo) with Hiranmay Mitra (Harmonium) and Pankaj Mishra (Sarangi)
- North Indian - Carnatic Rhythm Jugalbandi - Guru Karaikudi Mani (Mridangam) & Pt. Subhankar Banerjee (Tabla)
- Rahul Sharma (Santoor) with Pt. Ram Kumar Mishra (Tabla)
- Sujata Mohapatra (Odissi Dance)
- Ud. Aashish Khan (Sarod) with Pt. Bickram Ghosh (Tabla) & Shiraz Ali Khan (Sarod)
- Ud. Nishaat Khan (Sitar) with Anubrata Chatterjee (Tabla)
- Vidushi Arati Ankalikar (Vocal) with Pt. Anandagopal Bandopadhyay (Tabla) and Pt. Jyoti Goho (Harmonium)
- Pt. Uday Bhawalkar (Dhrupad Vocal)
- Flute-Violin Jugalbandi - Pt. Ronu Majumdar (Flute) & Atul Upadhyay (Violin) with Pt. Tanmoy Bose (Tabla)

==== SSF Alaap 2019 ====
- Kathak Duet - Abhimanyu Lal and Vidha Lal with Zuheb Ahmed Khan (Tabla) and Pankaj Mishra (Sarangi)
- Abhishek Lahiri (Sarod) with Shubh Maharaj (Tabla)
- Sanjukta Biswas (Vocal) with Soumen Nandy (Tabla) and Rupashree Bhattacharya (Harmonium)
- Suvendu Banerjee (Harmonium Solo) with Sohon Ghosh (Tabla)
- Mehtab Ali Niazi (Sitar) with Unmesh Banerjee (Tabla)
- Aarchik Banerjee (Tabla Solo) with Hiranmay Mitra (Harmonium)

=== Season 7 (1, 15 & 16 December 2018) ===
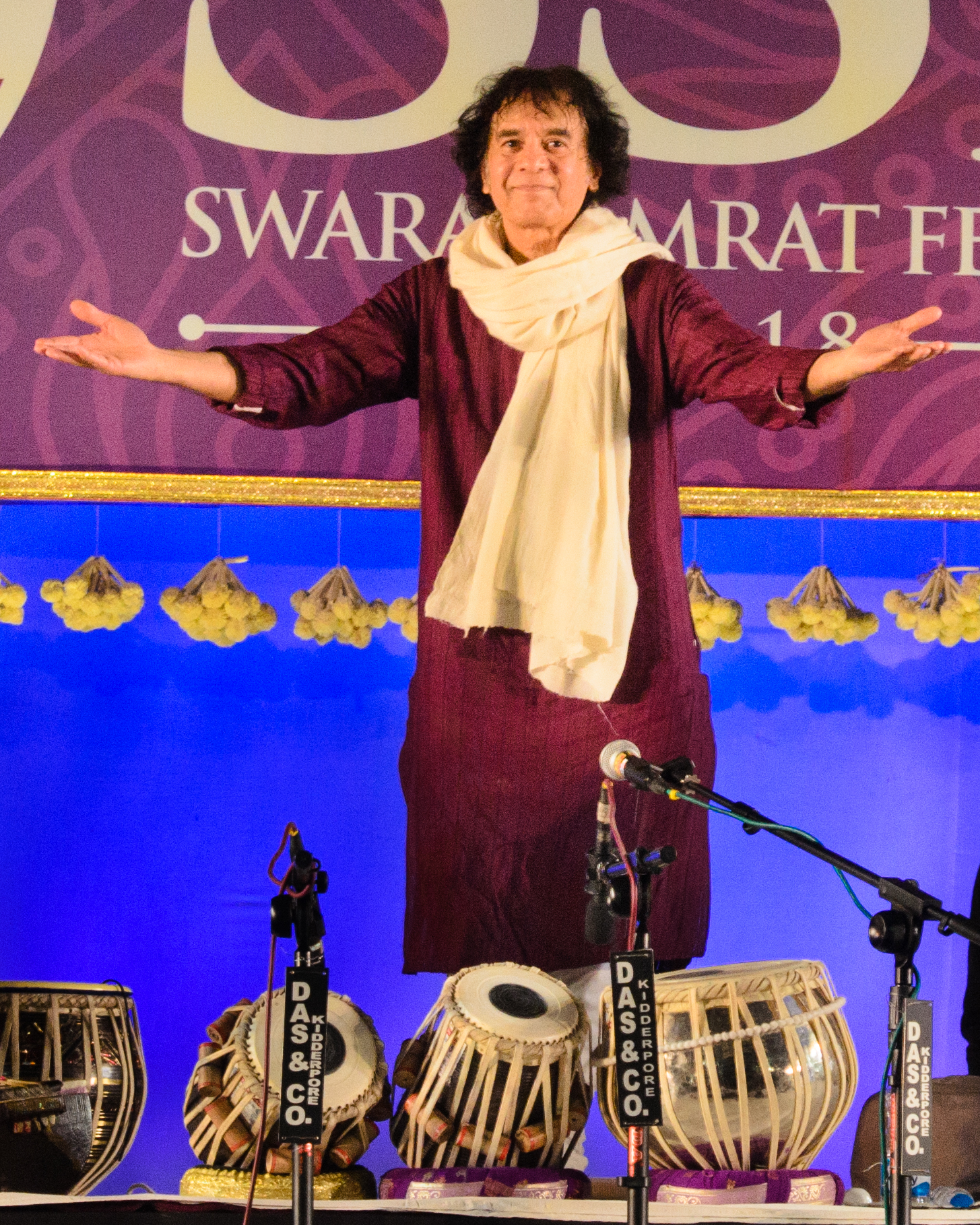
Ustad Zakir Hussain being welcomed by the full house at SSF season 7 in 2018

Sources:

- A Rhythm Ensemble - Ud. Zakir Hussain (Tabla), Naveen Sharma (Dholak), Anantha Krishnan (Mridangam) & Sabir Khan (Sarangi)
- Begum Parveen Sultana (Vocal) with Pt. Swapan Chaudhuri (Tabla) and Pt. Jyoti Goho (Harmonium)
- Bharatanatyam Duet - Dr. Mallika Sarabhai and Revanta Sarabhai
- Pt. Rajeev Taranath (Sarod) with Pt. Yogesh Samsi (Tabla)
- Pt. Venkatesh Kumar (Vocal) with Pt. Samar Saha (Tabla) & Rupashree Bhattacharya (Harmonium)
- Hindustani & Carnatic Flute Jugalbandi: Praveen Godkhindi (Hindustani Flute) & Shashank Subramanyam (Carnatic Flute) with Pt. Subhankar Banerjee (Tabla) & Patri Satish Kumar (Mridangam)
- Pt. Debashish Bhattacharya (Hindustani Guitar) with Pt. Tanmoy Bose (Tabla)
- Ud. Shujaat Khan (Sitar) with Ud. Sabir Khan (Tabla) and Asif Khan (Tabla)
- Jayateerth Mevundi (Vocal) with Soumen Sarkar (Tabla) and Sanatan Goswami (Harmonium)
- Manju Mehta (Sitar) with Ujjwal Bharati (Tabla)

==== SSF Alaap 2018 ====
- Kumar Mardur (Vocal) with Debjit Patitundi (Tabla) and Gourab Chatterjee (Harmonium)
- Kaushik Mukherjee (Sarod) with Rupak Bhattacharjee (Tabla)
- Debanjan Bhattacharjee (Sarod) with Sandip Ghosh (Tabla)
- Ayan Sengupta (Sitar) with Soumen Nandy (Tabla)
- Saberi Misra (Kathak) with Subir Thakur (Tabla), Debashis Sarkar (Vocal) & Sunando Mukherjee (Sarod)
- Ishaan Ghosh (Tabla) with Hiranmay Mitra (Harmonium)

=== Season 6 (16 & 17 December 2017) ===
Sources:

- Ud. Zakir Hussain (Tabla) and Rakesh Chaurasia (Flute)
- Pt. Rajendra Gangani (Kathak) with Pt. Sanjay Mukherjee (Tabla) and Pt. Fateh Singh Gangani (Tabla& Bol Padhant)
- Dhrupad Vocal Duet - Gundecha Brothers
- Ken Zuckerman (Sarod) with Pt. Parimal Chakraborty (Tabla)
- Pt. Ulhas Kashalkar (Vocal) with Pt. Suresh Talwalkar (Tabla) and Gourab Chatterjee (Harmonium)
- Purbayan Chatterjee (Sitar) with Pt. Anindo Chatterjee (Tabla)
- Kaushiki Chakraborty (Vocal) with Pt. Subhankar Banerjee (Tabla) and Rupashree Bhattacharya (Harmonium)
- Hindustani-Carnatic Mandolin Duet - Snehasish Mozumder (Hindustani Mandolin), U. Rajesh (Carnatic Mandolin), Ojas Adhiya (Tabla) and S.V. Ramani (Mridangam)

=== Season 5 (17 & 18 December 2016) ===
- Pt. Shivkumar Sharma (Santoor) with Ud. Zakir Hussain(Tabla)
- Pt. Budhaditya Mukherjee (Sitar) with Pt. Abhijit Banerjee (Tabla)
- Pt. Swapan Chaudhuri (Tabla Solo) with Hiranmay Mitra (Harmonium)
- Ud. Rashid Khan (Vocal) with Pt. Tanmoy Bose (Tabla) and Pt. Jyoti Goho]] (Harmonium)
- Vocal Duet - Pt. Rajan Mishra and Pt. Sajan Mishra with Pt. Subhen Chatterjee (Tabla) and Sanatan Goswami (Harmonium)
- Guru Sujata Mohapatra (Odissi)
- Pt. Partho Sarothy (Sarod) with Pt. Bickram Ghosh (Tabla)

=== Season 4 (10 & 12 January 2016) ===
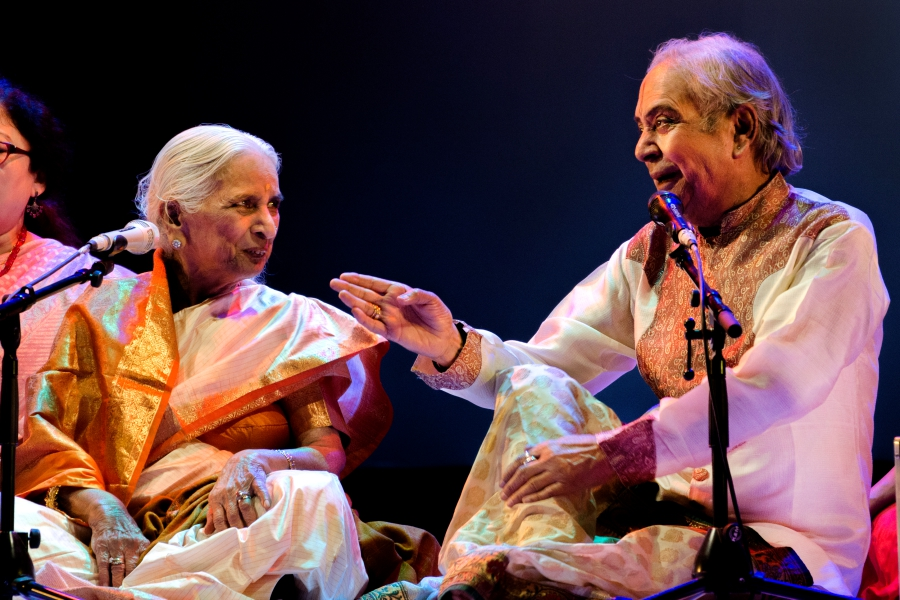
Vidushi Girija Devi & Pt. Birju Maharaj at SSF Season 4 in 2016

- Pt. Birju Maharaj (Kathak) with Pt. Anindo Chatterjee (Tabla)
- Vidushi Girija Devi (Vocal) with Pt. Gopal Misra (Tabla), Hiranmay Mitra (Harmonium) and Sarwar Hussain (Sarangi)
- Kathak-Vocal Duet - Pt. Birju Maharaj (Kathak) and Vidushi Girija Devi (Vocal) with Pt. Anindo Chatterjee (Tabla)
- Pt. Ajoy Chakrabarty (Vocal) with Pt. Yogesh Samsi (Tabla) and Pt. Ajay Joglekar (Harmonium)
- Pt. Subhankar Banerjee & Pt. Yogesh Samsi with Pt. Ajay Joglekar (Harmonium)
- Pt. Basant Kabra (Sarod) with Pt. Arup Chatterjee (Tabla

=== Season 3 (12, 13, 14 & 15 February 2015) ===
Sources:

- Pt. Tejendra Narayan Majumda (Sarod) with Ud. Zakir Hussain (Tabla)
- Vidushi Shubha Mudgal (Vocal) with Pt. Aneesh Pradhan (Tabla) and Sudhir Nayak (Harmonium)
- Ud. Shahid Parvez (Sitar) with Subhajyoti Guha (Tabla)
- Vidushi Manasi Majumder (Vocal) with Pt. Subhankar Banerjee (Tabla) and Rupashree Bhattacharya (Harmonium)
- Santoor-Flute Duet by Pt. Tarun Bhattacharya (Santoor) and Pt. Pravin Godkhindi (Flute) with Pt. Bickram Ghosh (Tabla)
- Pt. Venkatesh Kumar (Vocal) with Pt. Samar Saha (Tabla) & Rupashree Bhattacharya (Harmonium)
- Kaushiki Chakraborty (Vocal)

=== Season 2 (4 & 5 January 2014) ===
- Ud. Zakir Hussain (Tabla and Percussions), Shankar Mahadevan (Vocal), U. Shrinivas (Mandolin) and V. Selvaganesh (Percussions)
- Ud. Rashid Khan (Vocal) with Pt. Subhankar Banerjee (Tabla), Pt. Jyoti Goho (Harmonium) & Murad Ali Khan (Sarangi)
- Pt. Swapan Chaudhuri (Tabla Solo) with Allarakha Kalavant (Sarangi)
- Pt. Venkatesh Kumar (Vocal) with Pt. Samar Saha (Tabla) & Rupashree Bhattacharya (Harmonium)
- Pt. Kushal Das (Sitar) with Pt. Abhijit Banerjee (Tabla)
- Shahadat Hossain (Sarod) with Pt. Arup Chatterjee (Tabla)

=== Season 1 (5 & 6 January 2013) ===
- Ud. Zakir Hussain (Tabla Solo) with Dilshad Khan (Tabla)
- Pt. Shivkumar Sharma (Santoor) with Pt. Anindo Chatterjee (Tabla)
- Pt. Birju Maharaj (Kathak) with Pt. Subhankar Banerjee (Tabla)
- Pt. Hariprasad Chaurasia (Flute) with Pt. Subhankar Banerjee (Tabla)
- Vidushi Girija Devi (Vocal) with Pt. Samar Saha (Tabla), Sarwar Hussain (Sarangi) and Gourab Chatterjee (Harmonium)
- Ud. Aashish Khan (Sarod) with Pt. Swapan Chaudhuri (Tabla) and Shiraz Ali Khan (Sarod)

== See also ==
- List of Indian classical music festivals
