= Kaushiki Chakraborty =

Indian classical vocalist

Vidushi Kaushiki Chakraborty
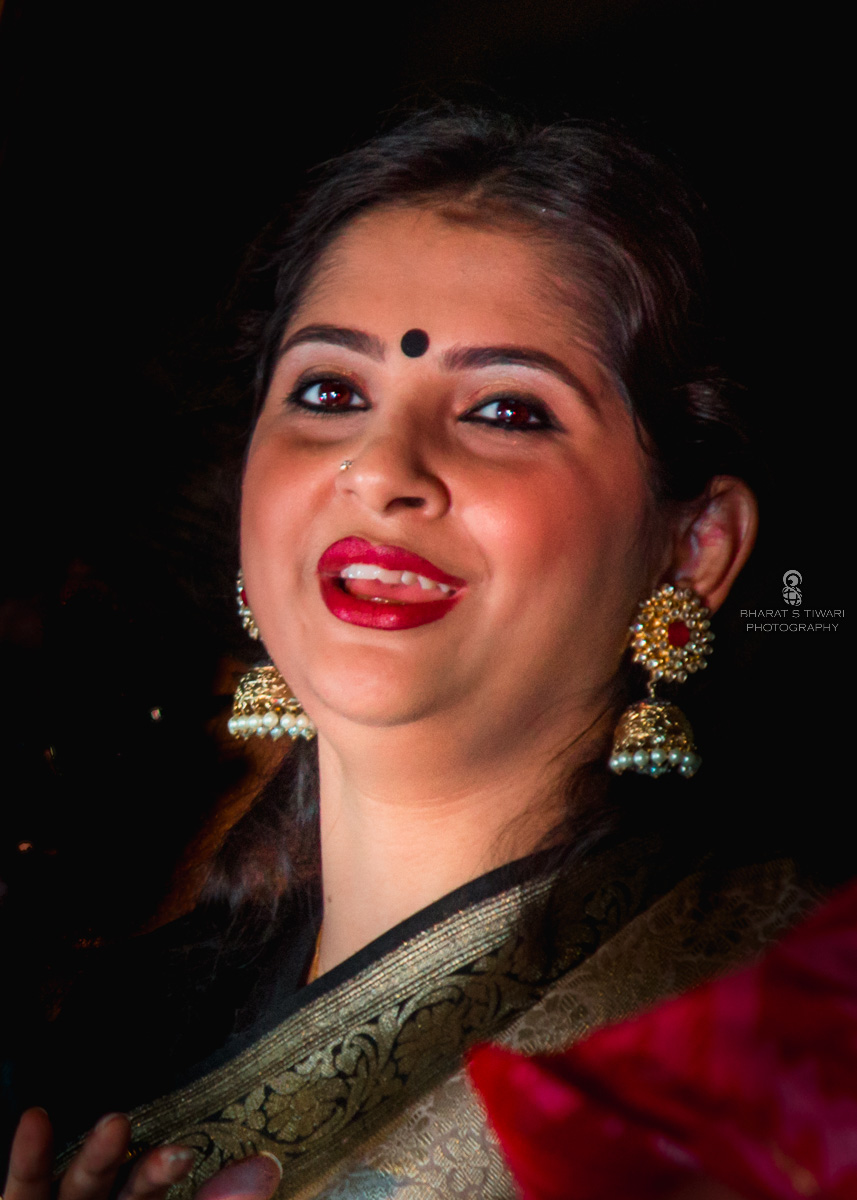

Background information
- Born: 24 October 1980 (age 46)
- Origin: Kolkata, India
- Genre: Hindustani classical music
- Occupations: Hindustani Classical Vocalist, Carnatic Classical Vocalist
- Spouse: Parthasarathi Desikan (m.2004)
- Website: www.kaushikismusicandus.com

Kaushiki Chakraborty Desikan (Note: Bengali: [kou̯ʃiki t͡ʃɔkɾɔboɾt̪i].) (Bengali: [kou̯ʃiki t͡ʃɔkɾɔboɾt̪i]; born 24 October 1980) is an Indian classical vocalist of the Patiala gharana. Her repertoire covers pure classical, Khyals, Dadras, Thumris, Bhajans and several other forms of Indian music. She is the recipient of 2005 BBC Radio 3 Awards for World Music in the Asia-Pacific category. She is the daughter of noted Hindustani classical vocalist, Ajoy Chakraborty. Kaushiki is also a trained Carnatic classical vocalist.

== Early life ==
Kaushiki was born on 24 October 1980 in Kolkata. She is the daughter of Chandana Chakraborty and the Padma Bhushan recipient Indian classical singer, Ajoy Chakraborty. She had an interest in music from the age of two. She accompanied her father on world tours of music performances since the late 1980s. She sang her first song in public, a tarana, at age 7, at the Calcutta Rowing Club.

At age ten, she started learning Indian classical music at the academy of Jnan Prakash Ghosh who was also her father's guru. Later, she joined the ITC Sangeet Research Academy from where she graduated in 2004, and was also mentored by her father at his Shrutinandan school of music in Kolkata. She has not only specialized in rendering of Khyals and Thumri but she has also learned Carnatic music from Vidwan Balamurali Krishna from 2002.

She completed her schooling at Patha Bhavan School, Kolkata. In 2002, she graduated from the Jogamaya Devi College, an affiliated undergraduate women's college of the University of Calcutta, in Kolkata with a first class degree in philosophy. She also obtained a master's degree in philosophy from Jadavpur University, Kolkata.

== Career ==
Chakraborty has participated in many major concerts. Apart from rendering Khyals in her performances, she has occasionally adopted contemporary form of Indian pop music. She performed at the Dover Lane Music Conference from the age of 20 and continued participating for the next 5 years. In her recitals, she presents a mature and rhythmical swing succeeded by unrestrained taans in three and-a-half octaves.

In the two-day celebration in honour of vocalist Kishori Amonkar in recognition of her 60 years contribution to music held at Pune on 14 February 2011, Chakraborty rendered raga Todi. Two other artists, Kalapini Komkali, daughter and disciple of Pt. Kumar Gandharva and Nandini Bedekar of the Jaipur-Atrauli gharana, also rendered bandishes in the same raga at the same venue during the morning session. Bharat Kamat on the tabla and Suyog Kundalkar on the harmonium provided support to all three artists. In the unique musical sessions organized by Mumbai's National Centre for the Performing Arts (NCPA), ragas in different time-cycles were presented on 18 September 2011 by three vocalists which included Kaushiki Chakraborty, Ulhas Kashalkar, and Devaki Pandit. This rendering was a departure from the normal evening concerts, and the ragas were sung in time periods appropriate to each raga, starting from early morning till evening.

In the early stages of her career, in August 2003, Chakraborty gave a live performance in London which was released as the record "Pure". Her father had accompanied her on harmonium on this occasion. She also performed at the ITC Sangeet Sammelan in India, the Spring Festival of Music (California), Sawai Gandharva Bhimsen Sangeet Mahotsav and Parampara Program (Los Angeles). She has been acclaimed as "torchbearer of the Patiala tradition" for her musical performances.

=== Talk show ===
Chakraborty hosts a weekly talk-show with singers in the entertainment channel, Ruposhi Bangla. The talk-show named "Gaan-Golpo ar Gaan" (Songs, Stories and Songs), aired on Sundays, presents music and gossip. She presents Bengali songs such as Classical, Rabindra Sangeet, Nazrulgeeti, Folk music, Toppa, Adhunik, Bangla Bands, film songs, and remixes. Her guests who have appeared on this show are Banasree Sengupta, Subhamita Banerjee, Lopamudra Mitra, Joy Sarkar, her father, Ajoy Chakraborty, as the guests.

=== Musical group ===
Chakraborty has formed an exclusive women's musical group called the "Sakhi" (meaning, friend) which is a forerunner in classical music in the country to "celebrate womanhood" and as a dedication to the famous mythological and historical woman of India – Ganga, Saraswati, Durga, Lakshmi, Draupadi, Kunti, Sita, Radha and Meera. The first programme of the group was planned to be held on 20 January 2015 at Kala Mandir, Mumbai. Chakraborty was the vocalist and the other members of this group were Shaoni Talwalkar on the tabla, Mahima Upadhyay on the pakhwaj, Debopriya Chatterjee on the flute, Nandini Shankar on the violin while the Kathak dance performance was by Bhakti Deshpande. They are daughters or grand daughters or disciples of famous Hindustani musicians. Chakraborty presented this musical ensemble with her group at the Carnegie Hall in October 2015; the programme was of 90 minutes duration.

== Awards and recognitions ==
Chakraborty has been the recipient of many awards. She received the Jadu Bhatta award in 1995, favourably mentioned and appreciated after her opening song at the 27th annual ITC Sangeet Sammelan in New Delhi in 1998, and received Outstanding Young Person in 2000. She received the BBC Award (2005) for outstanding achievement in music when she was 25 years old. On receiving this award she was praised "as one of the brightest emerging artists in Indian vocal music" and as critic Ken Hunt said "we are talking superlatives". BBC also made a short film featuring her musical journey – which covered people and places linked with her music. She has also received Sangeet Natak Academy's Ustad Bismillah Khan Puraskar 2010 for Hindustani Vocal Music, and the 2013 Aditya Birla Kalakiran Puraskar. She has also received "Shera Bangali Samman 2017" by ABP ANANDA.

== Personal life ==
Kaushiki married Parthasarathi Desikan, also a Hindustani classical vocalist, in 2004 and they have a son, Rishith Desikan.

== Performances ==
Chakraborty's discography includes "Footsteps," a solo debut in 1998, and "A Journey Begins" (2002). Her album "Pure" in 2004 was a record of her performance in London on 30 August 2003. She has also sung a kirtan at MTV Coke Studio – Season 2 – song name – Lagi Lagi with Shantanu Moitra and Swanand Kirkire. Her other popular song recordings are for movies Water, Thirumanam Enum Nikkah (2014) and Kutti Puli (2013). Rituparno Ghosh had asked her father to permit Chakraborty to act in his films but he refused saying that it would interfere with her musical career.

However, she appeared in only one song sequence in the film Chitrangada which she sang herself. She has sung songs for movies, such as her first song for the film Chaplin, Teen Kanya, a Hindi song Rahoon tere peechhey for Paanch Adhyay, Gulaab Gang. About her performances she says: "But I never try to act like a 60-year-old because I'm not that. Superimposed seriousness would just be a thing of pretense, not me. I like to sit on stage and chat with my audience, not close my eyes and alienate myself."

Kaushiki Chakraborty curated and presented the event- Remembering the Divas- at- The Nita Mukesh Ambani Cultural Centre- on 31 March 2024, along with other Indian Classical Singers, including Aruna Sairam. The six prominent female exponents of Indian classical music whose works were remembered and reiterated in these musical presentations were- Gauhar Jaan, Begum Akhtar, M.S. Subbulakshmi, Shobha Gurtu, Noor Jahan, Kishori Amonkar.

Chakraborty, along with Shreya Ghoshal, Sonu Nigam, Shankar Mahadevan, and Hariharan performed at Anant Ambani and Radhika Merchant's wedding in 2024.

== Recordings ==
Chakraborty has released her album titled "The Best of Kaushiki Chakraborty." Some of her other classical audio recordings are: Dhrupad Alap in Poorvi raga, Dhrupad in Poorvi raga, Khayal in Bageshree raga (in teen taal), Khayal in Bageshree raga (in ektaal), and Varnam in Swarashtram raga.

=== Movies ===
Year	Song	Film	Co-singer	Composer	Lyricist
2022	Keno Rong Dile Mohey	Bismillah	None	Indraadip Dasgupta	Srijato
2020	Teri Arzoo Mein	Shikara	Papon	Sandesh Shandilya	Irshad Kamil
2018	Naanaagiya Nadhimoolamae (Tamil)/Tu Srotu Hai (Hindi)	Vishwaroopam II	Kamal Haasan, Master Karthik Suresh Iyer	Ghibran	Kamal Haasan (Tamil)/Prasoon Joshi (Hindi)
2018	Ruthey Naina	Ek Je Chhilo Raja	None	Indraadip Dasgupta	Srijato
2017	Bharoto Bhagyo Bidhata	Rajkahini	Kabir Suman, Rupankar Bagchi, Lopamudra Mitra	Rabindranath Tagore	Rabindranath Tagore
2015	Kichu Kichu Kotha	Lorai	Arijit Singh	Indradeep Dasgupta	Prasen and Srijato
2014	Thuli Thuliyay	Ramanujan	Ramesh Vinayakam	Ramesh Vinayakam	Na. Muthukumar
2014	Jaa Urey	Hrid Majharey	None	Mayookh Bhaumik	Kaushik Ganguly
2014	Dheemi Dheemi Si	Gulaab Gang	Malabika Brahma	Soumik Sen and Sadhu Sushil Tiwari	Neha Saraf
2014	Ankhiyaan	Gulaab Gang	None	Soumik Sen and Sadhu Sushil Tiwari	Neha Saraf
2014	Rang Si Hui	Gulaab Gang	None	Soumik Sen and Sadhu Sushil Tiwari	Neha Saraf
2013	Basonar Gaan	Goynar Baksho	None	Rabindranath Tagore / Debojyoti Mishra	Rabindranath Tagore / Debojyoti Mishra
2013	Chillendra Chillendra	Thirumanam Ennum Nikkah	Sundar Narayana Rao	Ghibran	Kaathal Mathi, Munna Shauqat Ali
2013	Hridoy Aamar Nache Re	Shunyo Awnko	None	Rabindranath Tagore	Rabindranath Tagore
2013	Aloy Alokmoy Kore	Shunyo Awnko	None	Rabindranath Tagore	Rabindranath Tagore
2013	Emoni Barasha Chhilo Sedin	Shunyo Awnko	None	Kamal Dasgupta	Pranab Roy
2013	Rabso Neha Laage (Bilaval Bandish)	Shunyo Awnko	Ajoy Chakraborty	Gautam Ghose	Gautam Ghose
2012	Bhalobashi	Teen Kanya	None	Indradeep Dasgupta	Srijato
2012	Rahoon Tere Peechhe Peechhe	Paanch Adhyay	None	Shantanu Moitra	Swanand Kirkire
2012	Bodhu kon alo laglo chokhe	Chitrangada: The Crowning Wish	None	Rabindranath Tagore	Rabindranath Tagore
2011	Paata Jhora Brishti	Chaplin	Shaan	Indradeep Dasgupta	Srijato
2011	Phire Ja Re Mon Ja	Jaani Dyakha Hawbe	None	Indradeep Dasgupta	Srijato
2005	Vaishnava Jana To	Water	Ajoy Chakraborty	A. R. Rahman (Arranger)	Poet-Saint Narsinh Mehta

== Albums ==
- 2002 – A Journey Begins
- 2005 – Hamaaro Pranaam
- 2005 – Water
- 2007 – Rageshri
- 2007 – Pure
- 2008 – Jhanak
- 2010 – Jag Do Din Ka Mela
- 2011 – Manomay
- 2011 – Kaushiki
- 2011 – Jaani Dyakha Hawbe
- 2011_ Yatra 2:The Journey Continues
- 2012 – Paanch Adhyay (Original Motion Picture Soundtrack)
- 2013 – Boon
- 2013 – Hanuman.com
- 2013 – Shunyo Awnko
- 2013 – Thirumanam Enum Nikkah
- 2014 – Parapaar (Original Motion Picture Soundtrack)
- 2014 – Gulaab Gang
- 2014 – Ramanujan
- 2014 -- Sondhey Naamar Aagey (Original Motion Picture Soundtrack)
- 2014 – Hrid Majharey (Original Motion Picture Soundtrack)
- 2015 – Karvaan
- 2015 – Kadambari (Original Motion Picture Soundtrack)
- 2015 – Family Album (Original Motion Picture Soundtracks)
- 2016 – Mirzya
- 2017 – Kaushikis Sakhi
- 2017 – Arani Takhon (Original Motion Picture Soundtrack)
- 2017 – Gaayeja
