= Ragini Shankar =

Indian violinist

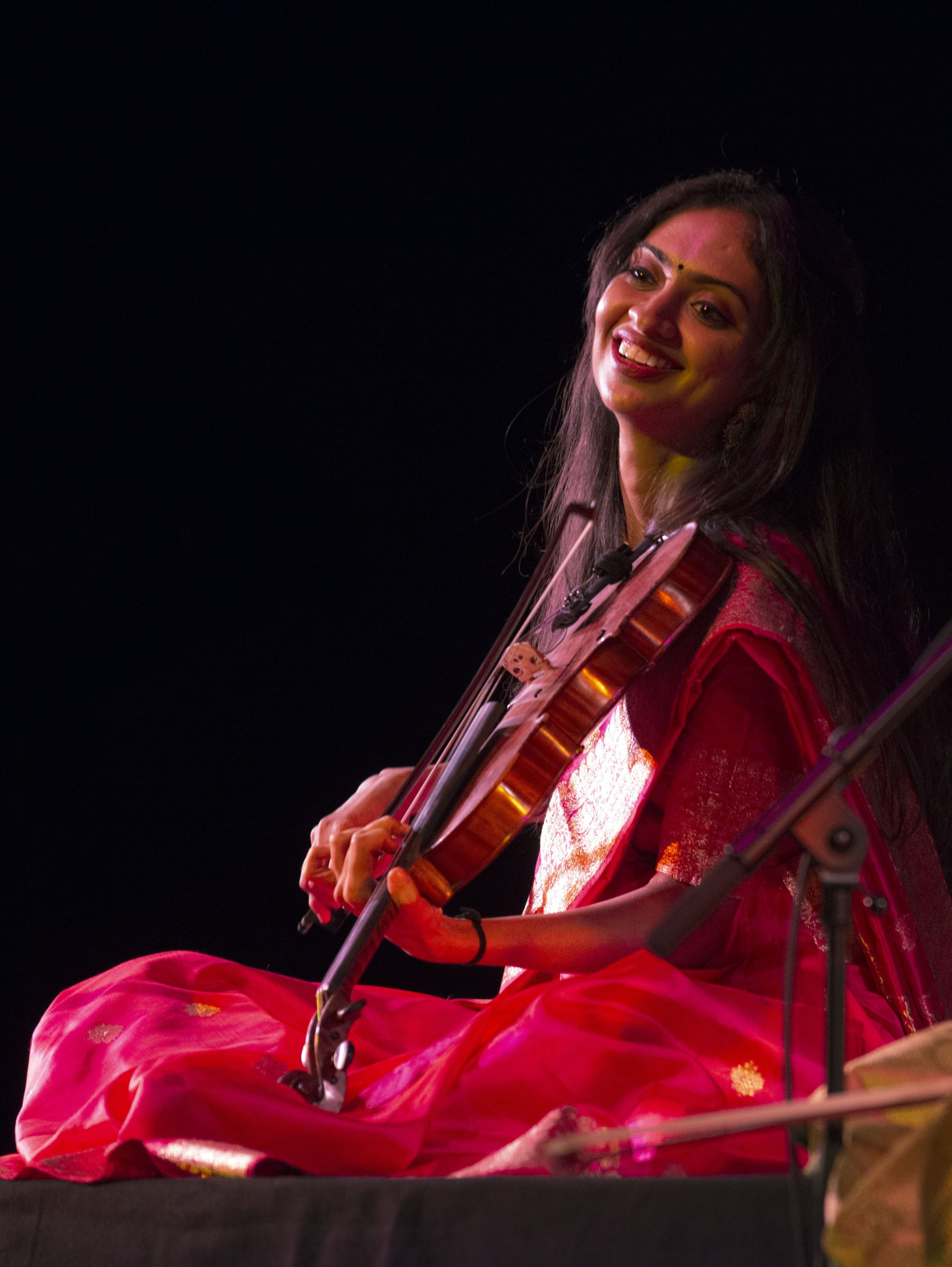
- Ragini Shankar performing at Theatre de la Ville, Paris

Background information
- Born: Varanasi, India
- Genres: Hindustani classical music, fusion
- Occupation: Violinist
- Instrument: Violin
- Website: www.raginishankar.com

Ragini Shankar is an Indian violinist who performs Hindustani classical music and fusion. She is the grand-daughter of the renowned Padmabhushan Dr. N. Rajam. and the daughter of Dr. Sangeeta Shankar

== Early life ==
She began her training at the age of 4 and gave her first public performance as an 11-year-old. She plays violin in the Gayaki Ang, a revolutionary technique to reproduce vocal music on the violin.

== Education ==
Shankar excelled in her education in mechanical engineering and also holds a master's degree in music.

== Performing career ==
She has performed in various prestigious festivals like the Europalia, MERU, Netherlands, Sawai Gandharva Bhimsen Festival, Dover Lane Music Conference, Saptak Festival of Music, Theatre de la Ville, Paris, Theatre de l'Alhambra, Geneva, Switzerland, MilapFest, Yaksha (festival), Aarohi for Pancham Nishad, Jaya Smriti organised by Hema Malini, Temple of Fine Arts, Bengal Music Foundation.

She has performed in several countries abroad; the USA, Canada, UK, Netherlands, Switzerland, Germany, France, Belgium, Hungary, Singapore, Malaysia and Dubai. Ragini gives lecture demonstrations and conducts workshops on a regular basis during her travels.

She is known for her collaborations with various artists in diverse genres. Ragini and her sister Nandini Shankar have been signed by Decca Records US, a part of Universal Music Group for a full-length music album for their musical ensemble ‘Taraana’. She is a part of the renowned Bollywood lyricist Irshad Kamil’s The Ink Band, a series of poetry interwoven with music. She is also a part of an Indo-French musical project called Sangata, formed by the noted French composer Thierry Pecou and was covered in an article in Le Monde. Her recent collaborations include inStrings, an innovative fusion band, giving a new sound to popular Indian tunes.

Ragini is a recipient of the distinguished Aditya Birla Kala Kiran Award and the Jashn-e-Youngistan Award presented by the Vice President of India. She was a faculty at Whistling Woods International School of Music in Mumbai for 6 years and currently teaches at the Rajam School of Violin. She has appeared on the platform of Talks at Google and Tedx for her talks on Indian music.

She resides in Mumbai.

== Awards and honours ==
Aditya Birla Kala Kiran Award, presented by Rajashree Birla, 2019

Jashn-e-Youngistan presented by the Vice-President of India, Venkaiah Naidu, 2018

Jaya Smriti presented by film actress and dancer, Hema Malini, 2012

== Discography ==
Month/Year of Release	Name	Genre	Artist(s)	Type	Label
March 2023	Indian Rivers	Indian Fusion	Ragini Shankar, Nandini Shankar	Single (Album:Taraana)	Decca Records US, Universal Music Group
February 2023	The Land of Spice	Indian Fusion	Ragini Shankar, Nandini Shankar	Single (Album:Taraana)	Decca Records US, Universal Music Group
October 2021	Vaishnava Jana To	Indian Semi-Classical	Ragini Shankar	Single	Legendary Legacy Promotions Pvt. Ltd.
January 2021	Vibe	Indian Fusion	Ragini Shankar	Single	Legendary Legacy Promotions Pvt. Ltd.
July 2020	Longing	Indian Fusion	Ragini Shankar	Single	Legendary Legacy Promotions Pvt. Ltd.
March 2020	Neelambari Live	Indian Fusion	Sandeep Narayan, Ragini Shankar	Album	Sounds of Isha
January 2020	Vande Maataram	Indian Semi-Classical	Sangeeta Shankar, Ragini Shankar, Nandini Shankar	Single	Legendary Legacy Promotions Pvt. Ltd.
May 2019	Wings in the Sky	Indian Fusion	Ragini Shankar	Single	Legendary Legacy Promotions Pvt. Ltd.
October 2019	Devi Bhajan in Raga Rageshri	Indian Semi-Classical	Ragini Shankar, Ojas Adhiya	Album	Legendary Legacy Promotions Pvt. Ltd.
September 2019	Raga of the Rain	Indian Classical	Ragini Shankar, Ojas Adhiya	Album	Legendary Legacy Promotions Pvt. Ltd.
April 2014	Asha	Indian Classical	Ragini Shankar, Mukundraj Deo	Album	Legendary Legacy Promotions Pvt. Ltd.
