= Bharat Kamat =

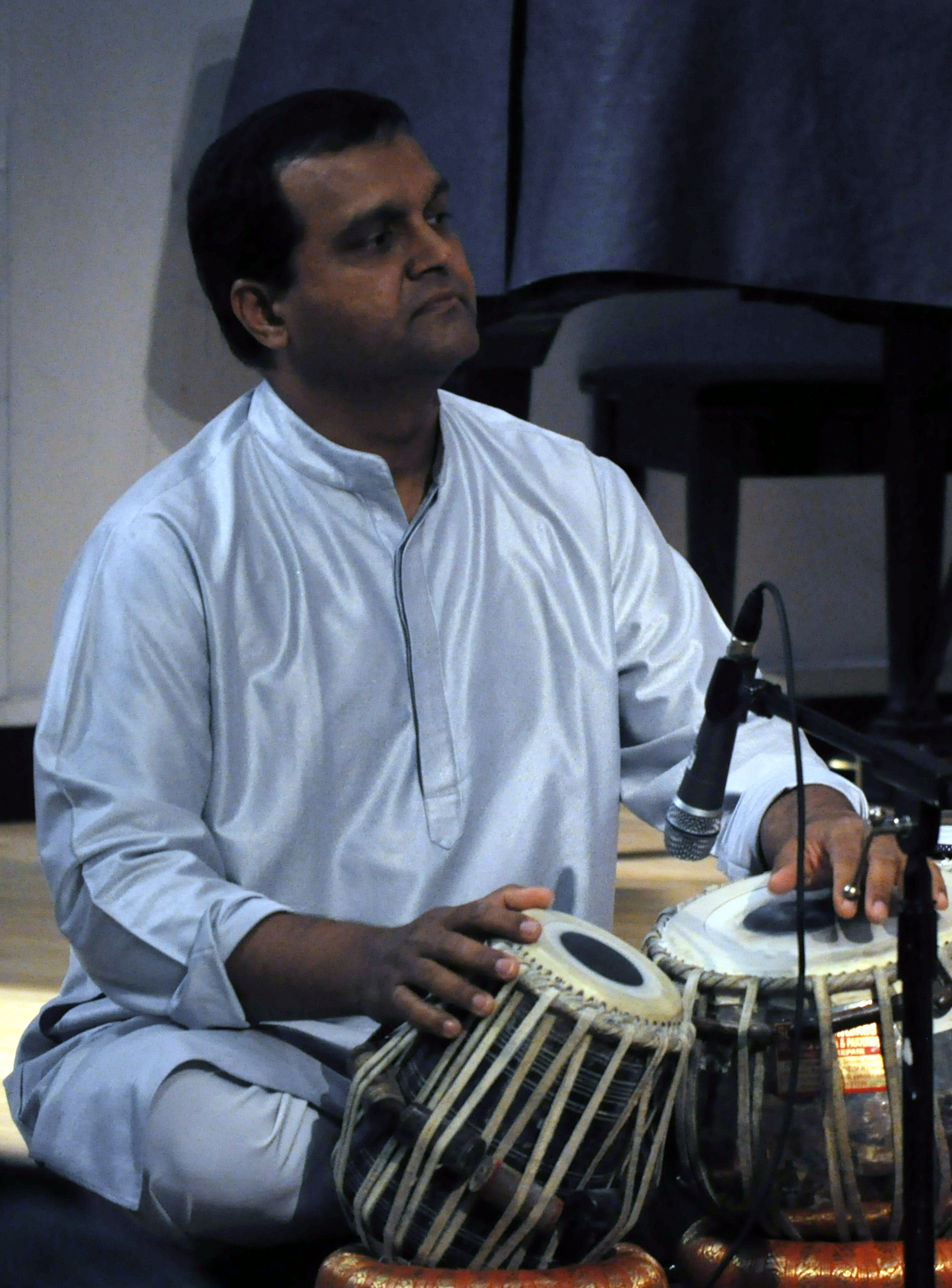

Background information
- Born: Bharat; 7 November 1967; Pune, Maharashtra, India
- Origin: Pune, India
- Genres: Hindustani classical music
- Instrument: tabla
- Years active: Year 1972 onwards
- Website: http://www.bharatkamat.weebly.com

Bharat Kamat (Birth:7 November 1967) is a Hindustani classical tabla player of the Benares Tabla Gharana.

== Early life and training ==
Kamat is born and brought up from Pune, India, and is one of the leading tabla artists of India today. At the age of five, Bharat started learning tabla from his father Pt. Chandrakant Kamat, who was a disciple of Pt. Samata Prasad of the Benares gharana. Bharat's grandfather, Pt. Shantaram Kamat, was a renowned stage-music artist. He did his schooling in NMV High School in Pune and was part of Swaranjali Systems. During his initial days, he played tabla with many Kirtankars (the people who sing Kirtan.

== Career ==
Kamat has provided tabla accompaniment in several commercial recordings and live programs. These include Sawai Gandharva Bhimsen Festival, Vasantotsav, ITC Sangeet Sammelan, Ragmala etc. A frequent performer at prominent music festivals held in India and overseas, Bharat Kamat has also presented solo performances and accompanied dance recitals. He has accompanied several eminent artists of Hindustani music including Pundit Bhimsen Joshi with whom he has toured India and gone overseas as well. He has also played Tabla with various artists which includes Pt. Jitendra Abhisheki, Anand Bhate, Malini Rajurkar, Veena Sahasrabuddhe, Kaushiki Chakrabarty, Pt. Mallikarjun Mansur, Kishori Amonkar, Pt. Jasraj, Girijadevi and many others. He has participated in all the leading music festivals in India and has toured the United States, U.K., U.A.E, Switzerland, Germany, the Netherlands, Indonesia, Hong-Kong, for performances. He has several recording labels to his credit, including His Master's Voice, Rhythm House, and Navras records (London) and he is a regular broadcaster with All India Radio and Doordarshan.

Kamat played Tabla for Bhimsen Joshi for consecutive 18 years between 1989 till his last concert before his death for more than 1000 performances in India and all over the world.

== Awards and recognition ==
He won the All India Radio competition in 1991. He has also won the Pune Municipal Corporation award.

- Award from Gandharva Mahavidhyalay

== Personal life ==
Kamat is married to Revati Kamat who is also a composer and classical singer. They have a son and a daughter.

== See also ==
- Bhimsen Joshi
- Chandrakant Kamat
