= S M Sultan Bengal Charukala Mahabidyalay =

- এস এম সুলতান বেঙ্গল চারুকলা মহাবিদ্যালয়
- Other names: S M Sultan Bengal Art College
- Established: August 10, 2009
- Founders: Bengal Foundation
- Affiliations: National University of Bangladesh
- Location: Sultan complex, Shishushorgo building, Narail; 23.1582039°N 89.5013475°E
- Website: bengalfoundation.org/s-m-sultan-bengal-art-college

S M Sultan Bengal Charukala Mahabidyalay (aks SM Sultan Bengal Art College) is a fine art college in Narail, Bangladesh, which runs educational activities under the National University of Bangladesh.

== Background ==
S M Sultan Bengal Art College (after S M Sultan Bengal Charukala Mahabidyalay) officially opened on August 10, 2009, at Sultan complex, Shishushorgo building at the bank of river Chitra in Masimdia village, Narail, Khulna by Bengal Foundation under Bengal Education & Research Programme. It is named after Bengali avant-garde artist SM Sultan, who was awarded with the Ekushey Padak in 1982; and the Independence Day Award in 1993 for his achievement in fine arts.

It offers degrees in Bachelor of Fine Arts (BFA) and a Masters of Fine Arts (MFA).

== See also ==
- SM Sultan
- National University of Bangladesh
