= Nandini Shankar =

Indian violinist

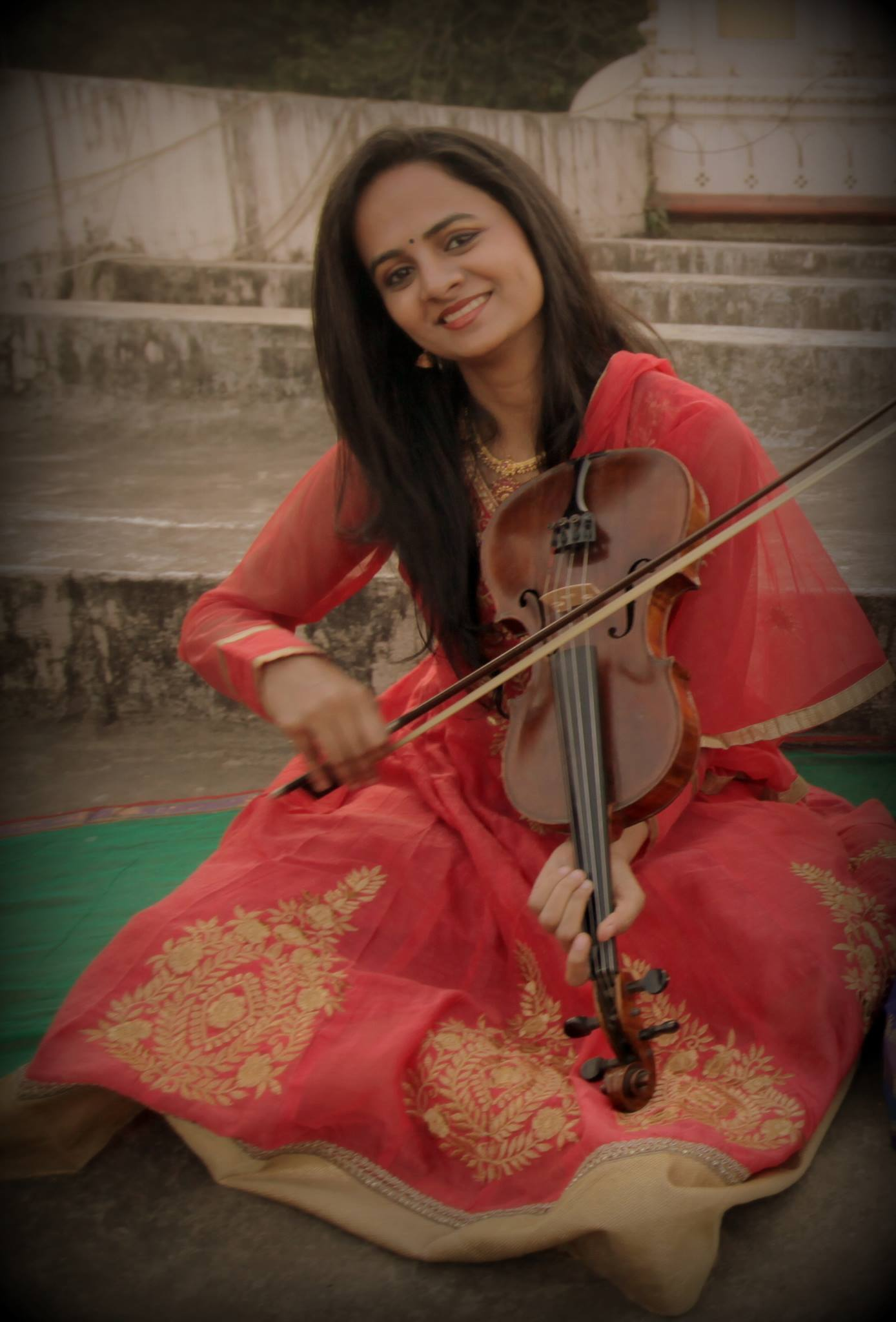

Background information
- Born: January 7, 1993 (age 33); Mumbai, India
- Genres: Hindustani classical music, Fusion
- Occupation: Violinist
- Instrument: Violin
- Website: www.nandinishankar.com

Nandini Shankar is an Indian violinist who performs Hindustani classical music and fusion. She is the daughter of Sangeeta Shankar and granddaughter of N. Rajam.

== Early life ==
Shankar started her training when she was 3 years old and gave her first public performance at 8. She gave her first full-fledged solo performance at the age of 13 years. She plays violin in the Gayaki Ang.

== Personal life ==
Nandini Shanker is grand daughter of Indian violinist Padma Bhushan N. Rajam and her mother Dr Sangeeta Shanker is also highly acclaimed violinist. Nandini married the renowned Carnatic music fusion artist, Mahesh Raghvan on 9 May 2021.

== Education ==
Nandini Shankar excelled in academics. She completed her graduation in commerce, and is a qualified Indian Chartered Accountant (ICAI). She completed her M.A. in Music.

== Performing career ==
Shankar performed at Carnegie Hall in 2016, Théâtre de la Ville in 2021 and The Esplanade in 2023. Countries in which she has performed include the United States, Canada, New Zealand, Switzerland , the United Kingdom, France, Germany, Belgium, Venice, Luxembourg, Greece, Netherlands, Hungary, the UAE, Bahrain, Bangladesh, Malaysia, Sri Lanka, Indonesia and Singapore. She has performed at festivals including the Europalia, Sawai Gandharva Bhimsen Festival, Yaksha (festival), Saptak Festival of Music, Aarohi for Pancham Nishad, ITC SRA Sangeet Sammelan, MERU in Netherlands, Jaya Smriti organised by Hema Malini, Temple of Fine Arts, Bhilwara Sur Sangam, The Association of Performing Arts of India, T. N. Krishnan Foundation, Delhi International Arts Festival, Bengal Music Foundation, and Dover Lane Music Conference. She has been telecast in Idea Jalsa and made a music video with her sister Ragini Shankar.

Nandini Shankar and her sister Ragini have been signed by Decca Records US, a part of Universal Music Group for a full-length music album for their musical ensemble 'Taraana’. She regularly releases singles with her husband Mahesh Raghvan. She is a part of Sakhi, India's first all-girl Indian classical musical band, formed by Kaushiki Chakraborty. She is also a part of 'inStrings', a fusion band combining various genres from across the world.

She resides in Mumbai.

== Discography ==
Month/Year of Release	Name	Genre	Artist(s)	Type	Label
December 2023	Orange to Red	Indian Classical	Nandini Shankar, Abhishek Mishra	Album	Legendary Legacy Promotions Pvt. Ltd.
September 2023	Meeting of the Ragas	Indian Fusion	Mahesh Raghvan, Nandini Shankar	Single	Mahesh Raghvan & Nandini Shankar
July 2023	A Billion Stars	Indian Fusion	Mahesh Raghvan, Nandini Shankar	Single	Legendary Legacy Promotions Pvt. Ltd.
June 2023	Taraana	Indian Fusion	Nandini Shankar, Ragini Shankar	Album	Verve Label Group
June 2023	Na Maanoongi	Indian Fusion	Mahesh Raghvan, Nandini Shankar	Single	Legendary Legacy Promotions Pvt. Ltd.
March 2021	The Khamaj Connection	Indian Fusion	Mahesh Raghvan, Nandini Shankar	Single	Legendary Legacy Promotions Pvt. Ltd.
August 2020	Aaj Jaane Ki Zidd Na Karo (Violin)	Ghazal	Nandini Shankar	Single	Nandini Shankar
December 2019	The Kapi Dance	Indian Fusion	Mahesh Raghvan, Nandini Shankar	Single	Legendary Legacy Promotions Pvt. Ltd.
August 2019	Raga Livewire	Indian Fusion	Nandini Shankar, Rhythm Shaw	Single	Legendary Legacy Promotions Pvt. Ltd.
June 2019	Immerse	Indian Classical	Nandini Shankar, Ojas Adhiya	Album	Legendary Legacy Promotions Pvt. Ltd.
April 2019	Saffron Nirvana	Indian Classical/Devotional	Nandini Shankar, Ojas Adhiya	Single	Legendary Legacy Promotions Pvt. Ltd.
March 2019	Naina More	Indian Semi-Classical	Nandini Shankar	Single	Strumm Sound
February 2019	Yaad Piya Ki Aaye	Indian Semi-Classical	Nandini Shankar	Single	Strumm Sound
June 2017	Kaushikis Sakhi	Indian Classical	Sakhi	Album	Saregama
March 2006	Three Generations on the Violin	Indian Classical	N. Rajam, Sangeeta Shankar, Ragini Shankar, Nandini Shankar, Vinayak Netke	Video Album	Legendary Legacy Promotions Pvt. Ltd.

== Awards and honours ==
Jaya Smriti presented by Hema Malini, 2012
Jashn-e-Youngistan presented by the Vice-President of India, [Venkaiah Naidu], 2018
