= Sangeeta Shankar =

Indian violinist (born 1965)

Sangeeta Shankar संगीता शंकर
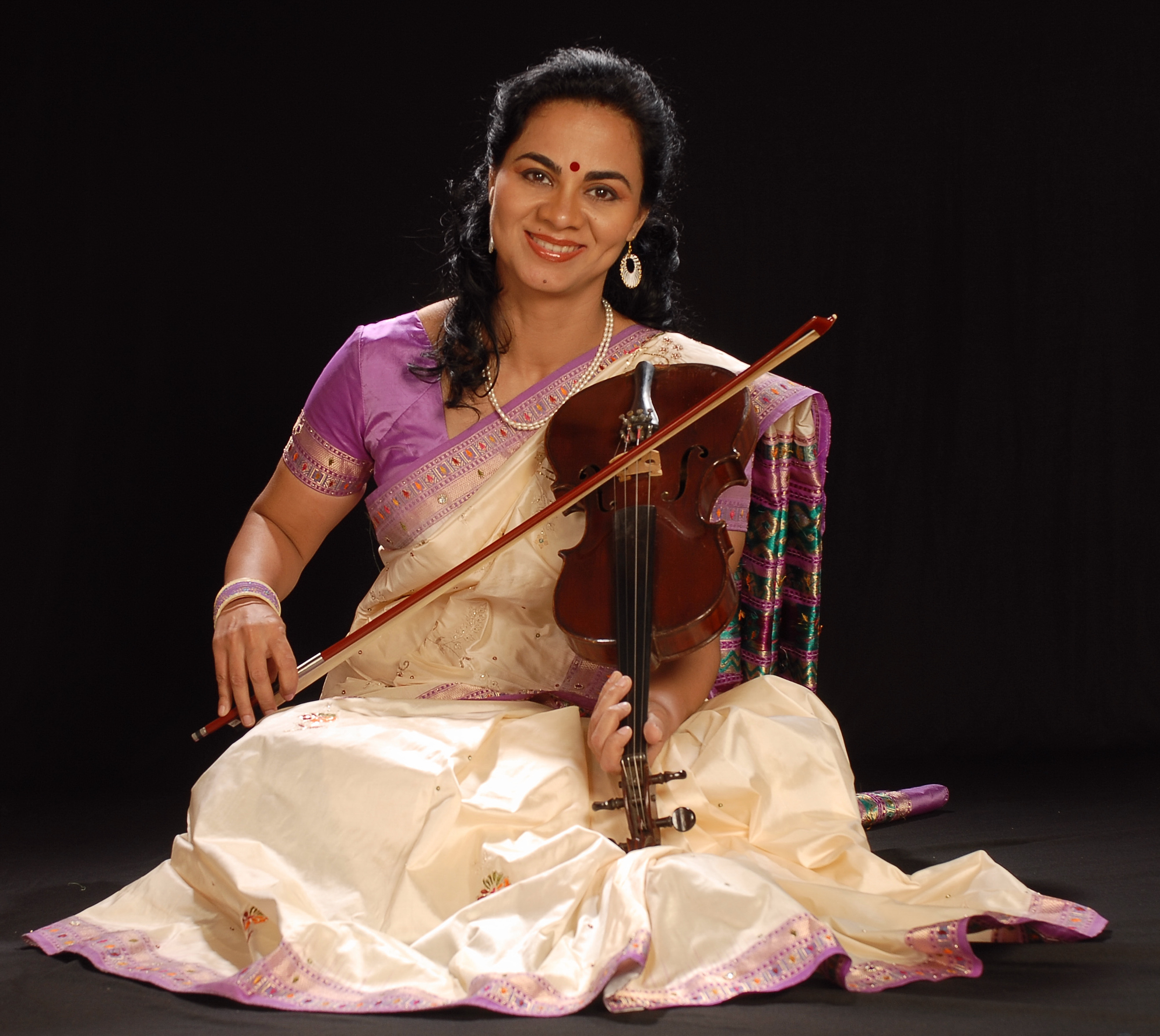
- Shankar in 2010

Background information
- Born: 12 August 1965 (age 61); Varanasi, India
- Genres: Indian classical; Hindustani classical; fusion
- Occupations: Musician; composer; entrepreneur; professor
- Instrument: Violin
- Years active: 1980–present
- Website: sangeetashankar.com

Sangeeta Shankar (Marathi: संगीता शंकर; born 12 August 1965) is an Indian classical violinist who performs Hindustani classical music and fusion. She is the daughter and protégé of Padma Vibhushan awarded violinist N. Rajam.

She has performed internationally and follows the gayaki ang technique of reproducing the human voice on the violin. She passed on the tradition to her daughters Ragini and Nandini Shankar. Their family includes her husband Shankar Devraj and son-in-law Mahesh Raghvan.

== Performing career ==
Shankar began accompanying her mother at the age of 13 and made her debut solo performance when she was 16. She plays the gayaki ang, a style often referred to as the 'singing violin', which aims to convey the emotions of a human voice through the violin.

== Entrepreneurship and other projects ==
In 1999, Shankar worked on the TV series Swar Sadhana, a program that aimed to educate the masses about Indian music. This series was created to increase awareness and reach of Indian classical music. Swar Sadhana utilized an experimental story format and featured various prominent celebrities including Madhuri Dixit, Javed Akhtar, Zakir Hussain, Birju Maharaj, Jagjit Singh, Naushad, Amol Palekar, Pankaj Udhas, Yukta Mookhey, Kanak Rele, Suresh Wadkar, N. Rajam, Sadhana Sargam, Shankar Mahadevan, Annu Kapoor, Veena Sahasrabuddhe, among others. It is currently available on YouTube as "Knowledge Series". Twenty years later, between 2020 and 2021, Shankar would work on another educational series that would be available on YouTube. Titled 22 Shrutis Simplified, it aimed to help learners understand and apply the knowledge of the 22 shrutis.

In 2015, Shankar founded School of Music in Whistling Woods International with Subhash Ghai, which she led until 2021. She remains a member of the academic advisory board of the institution. Since 2014, she has also taught violin at the Rajam School of Violin, a virtual school for learning gayaki Ang from the family of N. Rajam.

Since 2022, Shankar has been providing educational courses for media professionals and music students on music production. She is the founder and director of a music company, Legendary Legacy Promotions Pvt. Ltd., which consists of a storehouse of classical music and other products.

== Awards ==
Sangeeta Shankar received the Sangeet Natak Academi Award in 2021 from the President of India for her work in music education. Her workshops, seminars, and educational videos have opened Indian classical music and culture to different sectors – the masses, children, young music directors, media professionals, music students, and musicians.

== Discography ==
- Tabula Rasā (fusion) with Vishwa Mohan Bhatt and Béla Fleck, nominated for the Grammy Award for Best World Music Album in 1997
- Melody & Rhythm with Zakir Hussain
- Violin Dynasty (Raag Bageshree) with N. Rajam
- Aasha (Raag Jog)
- Kumari Sangeeta (Raag Bihag, Chayanat)
- Sensitive Strains of Violin (Raag Sohini, Bheem)
- A Delicate Touch (Raag Jogkauns, Desh)
- Together (Ragam Bhairavi, Malavi, Bilaharai, Todi) with N. Rajam
- Dedications to Dawn (Raag Mian ki Todi, Bairagi, Suha Sugharai)
- Sangeeta Shankar (Raag Todi, Bairagi)
- Music therapy for Migraine – Times Music (Raag Darbari Kanada)
- Saundarya (Raag Shyam Kalyaan)
