= Abul Khair Litu =

Bangladeshi businessman

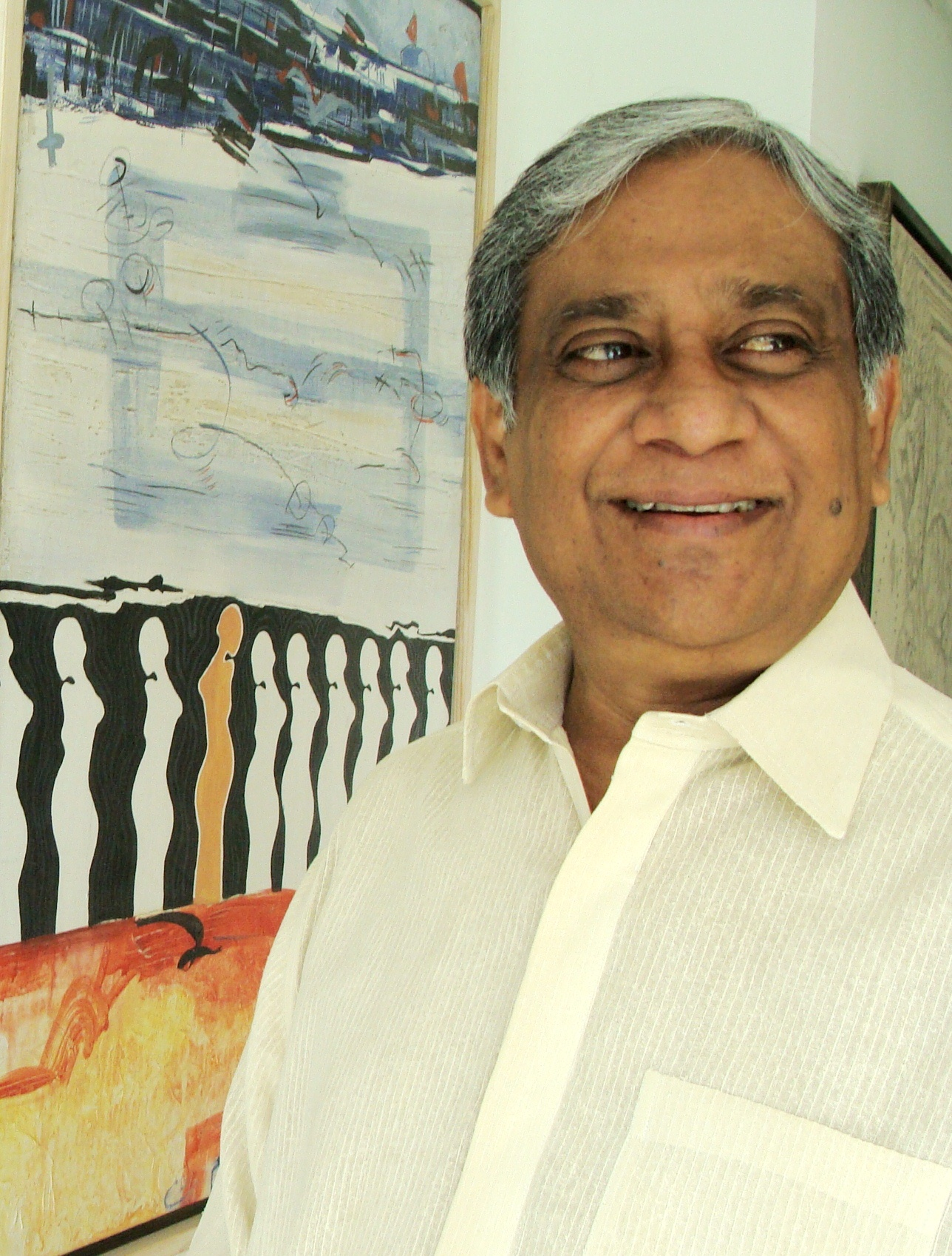
- Litu in 2015
- Born: 7 October 1950 (age 75); Dhaka, East Bengal, Dominion of Pakistan
- Occupation: Businessman
- Years active: 1986–present
- Known for: Promotion of the country's culture, art, music, theatre and literature
- Notable work: Bengal Foundation
- Spouse: Mahua Khair
- Relatives: Abdur Razzaq (uncle)

Abul Khair Litu (born 7 October 1950) is a Bangladeshi industrialist and entrepreneur. He is known for his involvement in the promotion of the country's culture, art, music, theatre and literature.

== Early life and education ==
Khair was born on 7 October 1950 in Dhaka, East Bengal, Dominion of Pakistan (now Bangladesh). His father was Abdul Khalek and his mother was Mumtaz Khalek. He had a brother Asfar Khair and two sisters, Naqveen and Nazneen.

Mumtaz Khalek was an artist. When Khair was in about class VIII he organized a solo exhibition of at least 30 of her drawings in the teacher's lounge of his school, Armanitola Government High School. They were lost after the exhibition. Khair's uncle Abdur Razzaq, a Dhaka University professor with whom he lived for a period, was another person who instilled in Khair a passion for the art and culture of Bangladesh. When Khair was a child, Razzaque would take him along on visits to his close friend, artist Zainul Abedin.

Khair obtained a bachelor's degree in commerce from Dhaka University in 1972.

== Career ==
He went to work in his father's factory, Purbasha Glass Industry in 1972. The next year he started his own business. His interactions with the artists who he met through his uncle inspired him to start his own art collection, so around 1973 he began buying artwork. Early purchases included paintings by Zainul Abedin and SM Sultan.

By the mid-1970s, Khair was chairman of Bengal Group. In 1981, he co-founded Arab Bangladesh Bank (later AB Bank), the first private sector bank in the country. He was president of Abahani Sporting Club from 1982 to 1987.

Khair set up the Bengal Foundation, a private trust funded by the Bengal Group, in 1986 to promote the art and culture of Bangladesh.

=== Bengal Foundation ===
Over a span of twenty-five years since its inception, the Bengal Foundation has promoted a variety of visual and performing arts and crafts, with regular local, regional and international events. One such prominent event is a series of monthly music concerts where admission is free. The Bengal Foundation also holds demonstrations, seminars and workshops, and awards scholarships for those interested in studying Bangladeshi music.

=== Bengal Classical Music Festival ===
Perhaps one of the most popular events organized by the Bengal Foundation is the Bengal Classical Music Festival. The Bengal Classical Music Festival is the world's largest classical music festival in terms of number of performers on a single stage, audience capacity and duration. The festival started its journey in 2012 and since then organized events every year. Performers from all over the world like Abhijit Banerjee, Hariprasad Chaurasia, Kaivalya Kumar Gurav, Budhaditya Mukherjee, Pandit Ajoy Chakrabarty and many others have performed on this stage.

=== Bengal Foundation awards ===
Litu has instituted a number of awards through the Bengal Foundation to encourage established as well as emerging Bangladeshi artists.

The Bengal Foundation Award, instituted in 1998, is awarded to an artist for commendable work in the National Art Exhibition organised by the Bangladesh Shilpakala Academy. The Master Craftsperson's award has been instituted in association with the National Crafts Council. It is the highest honour for praiseworthy work in the crafts field.

== Art museums and galleries ==
Litu converted one of his residences to establish the Bengal Gallery of Fine Arts in the year 2000. It is one of the earliest professionally run art galleries in Bangladesh, and is also the largest private one. Till date, the BGFA has showcased the work of over 250 artists and produced 35 documentary films. He has also unveiled plans to set up 'Art Lounges' in places where important policymakers and strategists convene. A part of his art collection is being used to decorate them. The first lounge is the Bengal Art Lounge in the Dhaka Club.

Litu also announced the building of the Bengal Museum of Contemporary Arts and Crafts, slated to be the largest private arts and crafts museum in South Asia. Construction work has begun at Savar, on the banks of the Bangshi River, on 135 bighas (45 acres) of land that he has donated for this purpose.

== Bangladeshi theatre and publishing ==
Litu has been a longtime sponsor of Bangladeshi theatre. The Development of Theatre program that he ran between 2001 and 2007 encouraged new performers with infrastructure development, training, workshops and theatre festivals across the country. The current theatre development program, which has been running since 2009, is aimed at marginalised communities such as Adivasis, transsexuals and Chars.

He has also founded a number of specialised publications to promote Bangladeshi art and culture.

Jamini – an English quarterly dedicated to the art of Bangladesh

Kali O Kalam – a monthly Bengali literary magazine. The Young Poet and Writer's award has been instituted by this publication to nurture emerging literary talent in Bangladesh.

Bengal Barota – a cultural events bulletin

Shilpa O Shilpi – a Bengali arts quarterly

Litu also gives greater exposure to traditional culture through his lifestyle glossies, Charbela Chardik and ICE Today, and ICE Business Times, a Bangladeshi business magazine.

Total Sports and Kheladhula were sports magazines launched in English and Bengali, respectively. Both were intended as periodic publications and were funded through ICE Media. The project also included plans for two sports-focused websites. Attempts to establish the publications and related digital platforms were made in 2011 and again in 2017, but the project was eventually discontinued. The closure in June 2017 drew criticism after operations were reportedly shut down without prior notice to staff and management. Journalists from several other media organizations joined the project with plans for its development. Following its closure, staff members reportedly lost their positions unexpectedly. The incident drew criticism within the media industry and affected perceptions of the project's management.

== Partnership with Skira Publications ==
In 2011, Litu announced that he had entered into a partnership with Skira, an Italian publishing house, to bring out a special series of 40 volumes showcasing Bangladeshi art. The first four volumes are scheduled to be released by April 2012 and are monographs of photographer Shahidul Alam, painters Kazi Ghivasuddin, Safiuddin Ahmed and Zainul Abedin.
