= N. Rajam =

Indian violinist (born 1938)

Dr N. Rajam
- Born: 1938 (age 87–88); Chennai, India
- Occupation: violinist
- Awards: Padma Shri (1984); Padma Bhushan (2004); Padma Vibhushan (2026); Sangeet Natak Akademi Award (1990); Sangeet Natak Akademi Fellowship (2012)
- Musical career
- Genre: Carnatic Hindustani classical music
- Instrument: violin
- Website: nrajam.com

Narayana Rajam (born 1938) is an Indian violinist who performs Hindustani classical music. She formerly served as a professor of music at Banaras Hindu University, and as a former dean of the Faculty of Performing Arts of the university. Rajam is the recipient of received the prestigious Padma Shri, Padma Bhushan and Padma Vibhushan (2026) awards, the last of which is the second highest civilian honour from the Government of India.

She was awarded the 2012 Sangeet Natak Akademi Fellowship, the highest honour in the performing arts conferred by the Sangeet Natak Akademi, India's National Academy for Music, Dance and Drama.

== Early life and training ==
N. Rajam was born in Chennai in 1938 in a musical family. Her father, Vidwan A. Narayana Iyer was a well-known exponent of Carnatic music. Her brother, T. N. Krishnan, was a prominent violinist of the Carnatic style. Rajam started her initial training in Carnatic music under her father. She also trained under Musiri Subramania Iyer, and learned raga development from vocalist Omkarnath Thakur.

Rajam received the prestigious titles of Padma Shri, Padma Bhushan and Padma Vibhushan from the Government of India.

== Personal life ==
N. Rajam is married to T. S. Subramanian, a chartered accountant and a former executive of Life Insurance Corporation of India. Her mother-in-law Padma Swaminathan, social activist and Carnatic music singer, was the last surviving daughter of F. G. Natesa Iyer. Vani Jairam, playback singer in South Indian cinema, is her sister-in-law.

== Performing career ==
Under the guidance of her father, Narayana Iyer, Rajam developed the Gayaki Ang (vocal style). Rajam has performed across the globe and in numerous places throughout India.

Rajam was a professor of music at Banaras Hindu University (BHU) in the Faculty of Performing Arts for nearly 40 years. She is a former chair of the department and the dean of the college at BHU.

=== Students ===
She trained her daughter Sangeeta Shankar, her granddaughters Ragini Shankar and Nandini Shankar, her niece Kala Ramnath, Pranav Kumar, Prof. V. Balaji (B.H.U.) and Dr. Satya Prakash Mohanty

== Awards ==
- Sangeet Natak Akademi Award, 1990
- Padma Shri, 1984
- Padma Bhushan, 2004
- Puttaraja Sanmaana, 2004
- Pune Pandit Award, 2010, by The Art & Music Foundation, Pune, India
- 2012: Sangeet Natak Akademi Fellowship (Akademi Ratna)
- 2018: Tana Riri award
- Padma Vibhushan, 2026
- Raganadasvarupini from TSN's Percussive Arts Centre (TSNPAC), 2026

== Discography ==
- Violin Dynasty (Raga Bageshri)
- Dr. (Mrs. ) N. Rajam (violin recital)
- A Duet On Strings
