= Shunyo Awnko =

2013 film by Goutam Ghose

- Directed by: Goutam Ghose
- Written by: Goutam Ghose
- Produced by: Gautam Kundu
- Starring: Soumitra Chatterjee; Konkona Sen Sharma; Priyanshu Chatterjee; Priyanka Bose; Lolita Chatterjee
- Cinematography: Goutam Ghose
- Edited by: Shuvro Roy
- Music by: Anupam Roy
- Distributed by: Rose Valley Films
- Release date: 18 January 2013
- Country: India
- Language: Bengali

Shunyo Awnko (English: The Zero Act) is a 2013 Bengali film directed by Goutam Ghose. The film stars Soumitra Chatterjee, Konkona Sen Sharma and Priyanshu Chatterjee in lead roles. In the film, Konkona Sen Sharma reportedly plays the role of a journalist and Priyanshu Chatterjee as a corporate officer.

== Cast ==
- Soumitra Chatterjee as Murphy
- Konkona Sen Sharma as Raka
- Priyanshu Chatterjee as Agni Bose
- Lolita Chatterjee as Laila
- Priyanka Bose as Jhilik Bose

== Soundtrack ==
- "Alap" (Tori) by Ustad Rashid Khan
- "Title Music"
- "Dhusor Chul" by Rupankar Bagchi
- "Hridoy Amar Nache Re" by Kaushiki Chakrabarty
- "Rabso Neha Laga" (Bilawal Bandish) by Pandit Ajoy Chakrabarty and Kaushiki Chakrabarty
- "Aloy Alokmoy Kore" by Kaushiki Chakrabarty
- "Bibhotso Moja" by Anupam Roy
- "Emoni Borosha Chilo Se Din" by Kaushiki Chakrabarty
- "Alap" (Sindhu Bhairavi) by Ustad Rashid Khan
