= Nagesh Surve =

Indian professional whistler, multi-instrumentalist and music composer

- Surve in 2020
- Born: Mumbai, Maharashtra, India
- Other names: Rishiraj, Rishi Raj
- Education: Bombay Municipal School
- Occupations: Professional whistler; music composer; multi-instrumentalist
- Years active: mid-1970s–present
- Known for: Whistling contributions in over 1,600 Bollywood films and songs
- Children: Rupali Surve
- Awards: Maharashtra State Film Award

Nagesh Surve is an Indian professional whistler, music composer, and multi-instrumentalist who has been a prominent session musician in Hindi cinema since the mid-1970s. Widely regarded within the Indian music industry as a master of studio whistling, Surve is notable for his ability to sight-read Western and Indian musical notation and execute complex melodic phrases while maintaining acoustic dynamic control under recording studio microphones.

Over an active recording career spanning more than four decades, Surve has contributed whistling pieces, romantic preludes, and specialized sound effects to more than 1,600 feature films and musical albums. In addition to his session work, he has composed background scores for Hindi and Marathi films under the pseudonym Rishiraj (or Rishi Raj).

== Early life and background ==
Surve was born in Mumbai, Maharashtra, on the auspicious Hindu festival of Nag Panchami, leading his parents to name him Nagesh. He spent his childhood in the Dadar neighborhood of central Mumbai, an area renowned as a major cultural and musical hub for film composers, instrumentalists, and arrangers during the golden era of Hindi film music.

While attending a Bombay Municipal school, Surve became a close childhood friend of Pyarelal Ramprasad Sharma, who would later achieve fame as half of the composer duo Laxmikant–Pyarelal. Recognizing Surve's early musical talent, Pyarelal’s father, the renowned music guru Pandit Ramprasad Sharma, took him under his tutelage and provided him with formal training on the violin. Surve subsequently studied the sitar and acquired an extensive grounding in both Indian classical music (including complex raga structures) and Western classical notation.

Surve discovered his ability to whistle during neighborhood games. Children in the locality used distinct whistling codes to communicate across buildings; Surve began mimicking these distinct tones with absolute precision, often causing playful confusion among his friends. Recognizing his acoustic pitch and tonal stability, older youths in the area encouraged him to whistle melodic tunes, laying the foundation for his future professional specialisation.

== Career ==
=== 1970s–1980s: Debut and breakthrough ===
Surve initially entered the film industry as an orchestral session musician, playing violin and sitar in large recording ensembles. His transition to specialized studio whistling occurred unexpectedly during an informal picnic with industry musicians, where Kishore Sharma, an assistant to music director Usha Khanna, heard him whistling and invited him for studio sessions.

Surve's first major credit as a studio whistler was the evergreen romantic song "Dil Kya Kare" from the film Julie (1975), composed by Rajesh Roshan. He subsequently contributed whistling tracks to various films, including the song "Chal Chal Mere Bhai" in Manmohan Desai's Naseeb (1981).

His decisive industry breakthrough occurred in 1983 when composer duo Laxmikant–Pyarelal engaged him for Subhash Ghai's romantic action drama Hero. Surve provided the film's signature flute-like whistle theme, which gained widespread popularity across India. Following this success, whistling became his primary professional identity in Hindi cinema.

=== 1990s–present: Prominence and prolific contributions ===
Throughout the 1990s and 2000s, Surve became Bollywood's foremost whistler, collaborating with virtually every major music director. He adapted seamlessly from traditional live acoustic sessions with large orchestras to modern digital multi-track recording systems.

Notable contributions from this era include:

- Performing the signature romantic prelude in "Are Re Are" from Yash Chopra's Dil To Pagal Hai (1997), composed by Uttam Singh.
- Whistling in soundtracks produced by Dharma Productions, including Karan Johar's Kuch Kuch Hota Hai (1998) and Kabhi Khushi Kabhie Gham... (2001).
- The romantic whistle melody in "Chalte Chalte" from Aditya Chopra's Mohabbatein (2000), composed by Jatin–Lalit.
- The prominent whistling motif in the hit song "Chand Sifarish" from Fanaa (2006).
- The upbeat title theme in Dhoom 2 ("Dhoom Again") (2006), composed by Pritam Chakraborty.
- Whistling sections for the soundtrack of Anurag Basu's critically acclaimed film Barfi! (2012).

In addition to musical melodies, Surve supplied specialized acoustic sound effects, such as authentic bird calls and environmental sounds for films including Amol Palekar's Paheli (2005) and Rakesh Roshan's superhero film Krrish (2006).

=== Work as music composer (Rishiraj) ===
To prevent professional confusion with another contemporary musician of the same name, Surve adopted the pseudonym Rishiraj (or Rishi Raj) for his composing assignments. Under this name, he composed original songs and background scores for approximately thirty Hindi and Marathi feature films.

Notable scoring credits include the Hindi action film Zakhmi Dil (1994), starring Akshay Kumar. For his composition work on the Marathi feature Mi Tujhi Tujhich Re, Surve was honored with a Maharashtra State Film Award.

== Artistry and technique ==
Surve's whistling technique is characterized by pure intonation, breath endurance, and a smooth, woodwind-like timbre that is often mistaken by listeners for a bansuri or Western concert flute.

Unlike casual whistlers, Surve applies formal classical mechanics:

- Notation Reading: He is among the few session whistlers capable of reading complex Western sheet music and Indian sargam notation in real-time during live studio recordings.
- Microphone Technique: Whistling generates sharp air blasts (plosives) that can easily distort studio microphones. Surve developed specialized embouchure angles and dynamic breath control to maintain clear capture without clipping or harsh sibilance.
- Classical Fluency: He has recorded intricate classical ragas, such as Yaman Kalyan, entirely through whistling.

Surve has consistently advocated for live, human whistling over digital synthesizers and sound libraries, maintaining that subtle human articulations, glissandos, and emotional microtones cannot be recreated synthetically.

== Reception and legacy ==
Surve is regarded as an indispensable yet often under-credited pioneer of Bollywood's golden acoustic era. Over the decades, his artistry earned praise from leading musical personalities:

- Legendary playback singer Kishore Kumar once commended him during a joint recording session, remarking that Surve's whistling was "as flawless as my singing."
- Famed shehnai maestro Bismillah Khan, upon hearing one of Surve's recordings without visual context, reportedly assumed the music was being played on an acoustic flute.
- Composer Lalit Pandit (of the Jatin–Lalit duo) publicly praised Surve's musicality, noting: "Many people can whistle, but Surve does it while reading notation, improvises with deep musical intellect, and maintains impeccable rhythm."

== Personal life ==
Surve resides in Goregaon East, Mumbai, where he operates a home recording and acoustic studio.

His daughter, Rupali Surve, was personally trained by him in classical whistling and music transcription. She works as an assistant in his studio and has collaborated with him as a co-whistler on major Bollywood film soundtracks, including Sanjay Leela Bhansali's Hum Dil De Chuke Sanam (1999) and Dhoom 2 (2006).

== Selected filmography ==
Year	Film	Language	Notes / Songs	Ref.
1975	Julie	Hindi	Whistling in "Dil Kya Kare"	
1980	Karz	Hindi	Studio whistling contributor	
1981	Naseeb	Hindi	Whistling in "Chal Chal Mere Bhai"	
1983	Hero	Hindi	Signature title whistle theme	
1988	Tezaab	Hindi	Background score whistling	
1989	Chandni	Hindi	Tar shehnai & whistling	
1991	Saudagar	Hindi	Whistling in "Ilu Ilu" / theme	
1994	Zakhmi Dil	Hindi	Music composer (as Rishiraj)	
1997	Dil To Pagal Hai	Hindi	Whistle prelude in "Are Re Are"	
1998	Kuch Kuch Hota Hai	Hindi	Whistling in "Yeh Ladka Hai Deewana"	
1999	Hum Dil De Chuke Sanam	Hindi	With daughter Rupali Surve	
2000	Mohabbatein	Hindi	Whistling in "Chalte Chalte"	
2005	Paheli	Hindi	Specialized bird calls & sound design	
2006	Fanaa	Hindi	Whistle hook in "Chand Sifarish"	
2006	Dhoom 2	Hindi	Whistling in "Dhoom Again"	
2006	Krrish	Hindi	Nature sound effects and bird calls	
2006	Lage Raho Munna Bhai	Hindi	Background score whistling	
2012	Barfi!	Hindi	Title track ("Ala Barfi")	

== Awards and recognition ==
- Maharashtra State Film Award – Best Music Direction for the Marathi film Mi Tujhi Tujhich Re
