= ITC SRA Sangeet Sammelan =

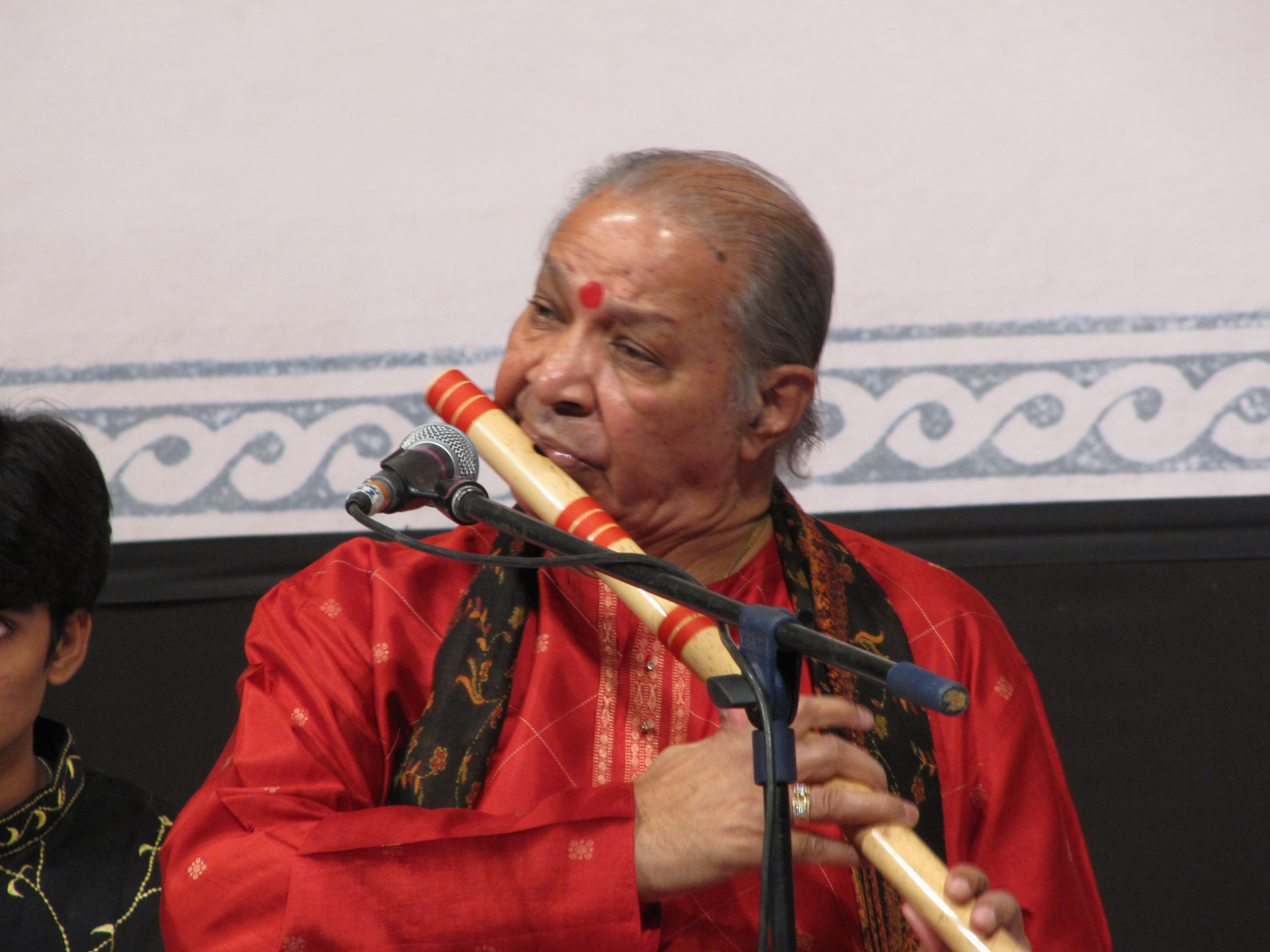
- Pt. Hariprasad Chaurasia at ITC Sangeet Sammelan, Bangalore, 2010
- Location: India
- Years active: 1971 - Present
- Founders: ITC Sangeet Research Academy
- Website: www.itcsra.org

ITC SRA Sangeet Sammelan commonly referred as ITC Sangeet Sammelan is an annual Indian classical music festival. Established in 1971, it is organised by ITC Sangeet Research Academy (ITC SRA) and held by turn in various cities in India. Over the decades, it has developed into a platform for established classical musicians as well as younger performers associated with ITC SRA.

== History ==
The first ITC Sangeet Sammelan was held in 1971 at Vigyan Bhawan, Delhi and featured musicians including Bismillah Khan, Begum Akhtar, Vilayat Khan, Ravi Shankar, Bhimsen Joshi and Amjad Ali Khan. The festival moved to the newly opened Kamani Auditorium the following year.

== See also ==
- Swara Samrat festival
