= Nazrul Mancha =

General information
- Type: Auditorium
- Location: Kolkata, India

Technical details
- Structural system: Semi-circular stage

Other information
- Seating capacity: 2400

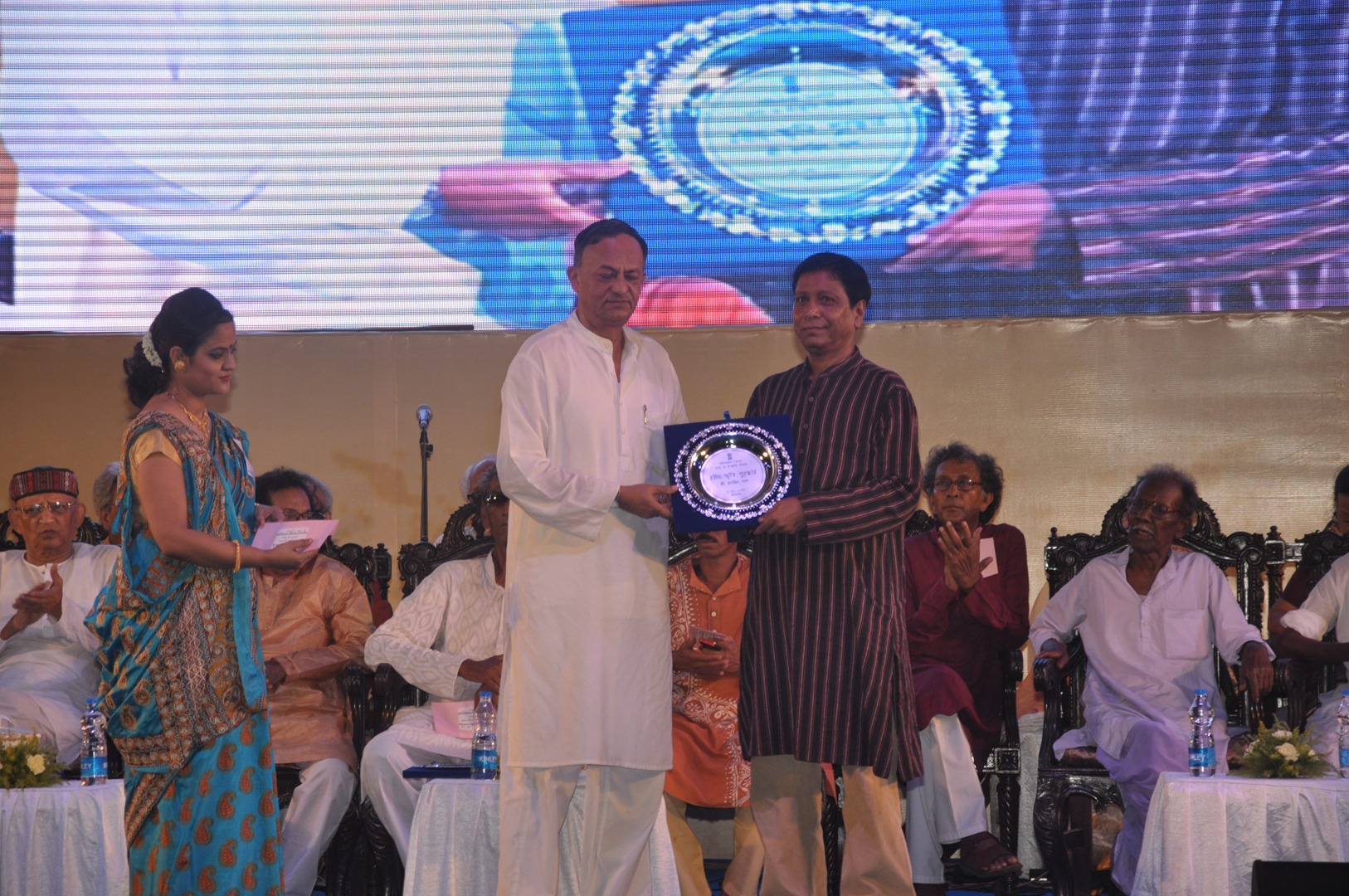
'Rabindra Puraskar' giving ceremony at Nazrul Mancha

Nazrul Mancha (Bengali: নজরুল মঞ্চ) is an auditorium in Kolkata, India. Named after Bengali poet Kazi Nazrul Islam, the auditorium is notably used as the venue for the Dover Lane Music Conference in January each year, where audiences enjoy musical performances for four consecutive nights.

In 1996, famous American musician Pete Seeger performed at Nazrul Mancha. In 2012, the Finnish band Poets of the Fall performed at Nazrul Mancha during its Temple of Thought tour in India.
