= Chandrakant Kamat =

Indian musician

- Born: Chandrakant Shantaram Kamat; 26 November 1933; Dhule, Maharashtra, British India
- Origin: Dhule, India
- Died: 28 June 2010 (aged 76) Pune, Maharashtra, India
- Genres: Hindustani classical music
- Instrument: tabla
- Years active: 1989–2010
- Formerly of: Samta Prasad

Chandrakant Kamat (26 November 1933 – 28 June 2010) was a Hindustani classical tabla player of the Benares Tabla Gharana.

== Early life and training ==
Kamat was born in Dhule to a Saraswat Brahmin family with strong musical traditions. His father Shantaram Kamat was a renowned Natyageet musician. Kamat started as a child artist in the Natak (musical plays) of his father's theatre company, Anandvilas, and began learning the tabla at a young age. Kamat learned from gurus Raghunath Shivalkar, Rambhau Vasht, and Digambar Yamaji Kadam, and he also trained in Indian classical dance.

== Performing career ==
In 1952, Kamat shifted his base to Pune and became among the most trusted tabla accompanists for Kathak dancer Rohini Bhate for over 15 years. In 1964, he became a gandabandh disciple of Samta Prasad of the Benares gharana.

From 1956 to 1991, Kamat also provided tabla accompaniment in Sangeet Nataks (Marathi musical plays) that featured artists like Hirabai Badodekar and Jyotsna Bhole. During this time, Kamat also worked as a staff artist for AIR, Pune.

Kamat accompanied musicians including Bhimsen Joshi, Begum Akhtar, Hariprasad Chaurasia, Bal Gandharva, and Kumar Gandharva. Kamat's performances also extend to programs on Bhavgeet, Lavani, Thumri, and most notably Geet Ramayan.

== Awards and recognition ==
- 1999 - Sangatkar Puraskar
- 2001 - Vasundhara Pandit Puraskar

== Students ==
Pt.Chandrakant Kamat has taught tabla to many students including two sons, Subhash Kamat and Bharat Kamat, who are also Tabla players. Other students include Yogesh Awlaskar, Sameep Kulkarni and Nikhil Parchure.

== Death ==
On the morning of Monday 28 June 2010, Kamat died of a cardiac arrest.
