= Shrutinandan =

Indian classical music academy, India

Shrutinandan is an Indian classical music academy located in Kolkata, India. It is run by vocalist, Pandit Ajoy Chakrabarty.

== History ==
Shrutinandan was inaugurated on the July 1997.

Its objective is towards the promotion of music and identifying young talent and training them on Hindustani music.

== Research ==
The academy carries out research in Hindustani classical music in order to restore some of the undocumented works by the great maestros.
