= Bengal Foundation =

Bangladeshi cultural organization

- বেঙ্গল ফাউন্ডেশন
- Formation: 1986; 40 years ago
- Founder: Abul Khair Litu
- Founded at: Bangladesh
- Type: Trust
- Legal status: Active
- Headquarters: Bengal Shilpalay, Dhanmondi
- Location: Dhaka, Bangladesh
- Coordinates: 23.7533849°N 90.3698115°E
- Owner: Bengal Group
- Chairman: Abul Khair Litu
- Website: bengalfoundation.org

The Bengal Foundation (Bengali: বেঙ্গল ফাউন্ডেশন) is a Bangladeshi non-profit and charitable organization headquartered in Dhanmondi, Dhaka. It is mostly known for organizing local and international cultural events in the country.

== History ==
Bengal Foundation was founded by Bangladeshi industrialist and entrepreneur Abul Khair Litu in 1986, as part of his endeavour to promote and showcase Bangladeshi art on a larger platform. The foundation was registered as a private trust and funded entirely by the Bengal Group. Since 1999, the foundation has organised several international art camps that involve nearly 300 artists from around the world. Notable venues include Florence (2005), Dhaka (2006), Kolkata (2008) and Maldives.

== Projects ==
=== Films and documentaries ===
The Bengal Foundation produced and made films and documentaries, which are sorted below:

- Chobir Desher Chobi - Watercolour workshop
- Dhaka Art Camp 2006 - Dhaka Art Camp
- Portrait of an Alluvial Artist - A documentary about Kalidas Karmakar.
- Antarbikshan (Introspection) - A documentary about Swapan Chowdhury.
- Samay Khanan (Excavating Time) - A documentary about Dilara Begum Jolly.
- Jalgadhuli (Twilight Colours) - A documentary about Farida Zaman.
- Garaner Gahine - A documentary about Abdur Razzaque.

=== Bengal Publications ===
Bengal Publications is a publication center conducted and run by the Bengal Foundation.

== Android applications ==
Currently, four different android application is released by the foundation. Bengal eBoi:Bengali eBook Bank is for Bengali e-book collection. Kali o Kalam and ICE Today is for news and magazine.
