= Ajoy Chakraborty =

Indian classical vocalist

Pandit Ajoy Chakraborty
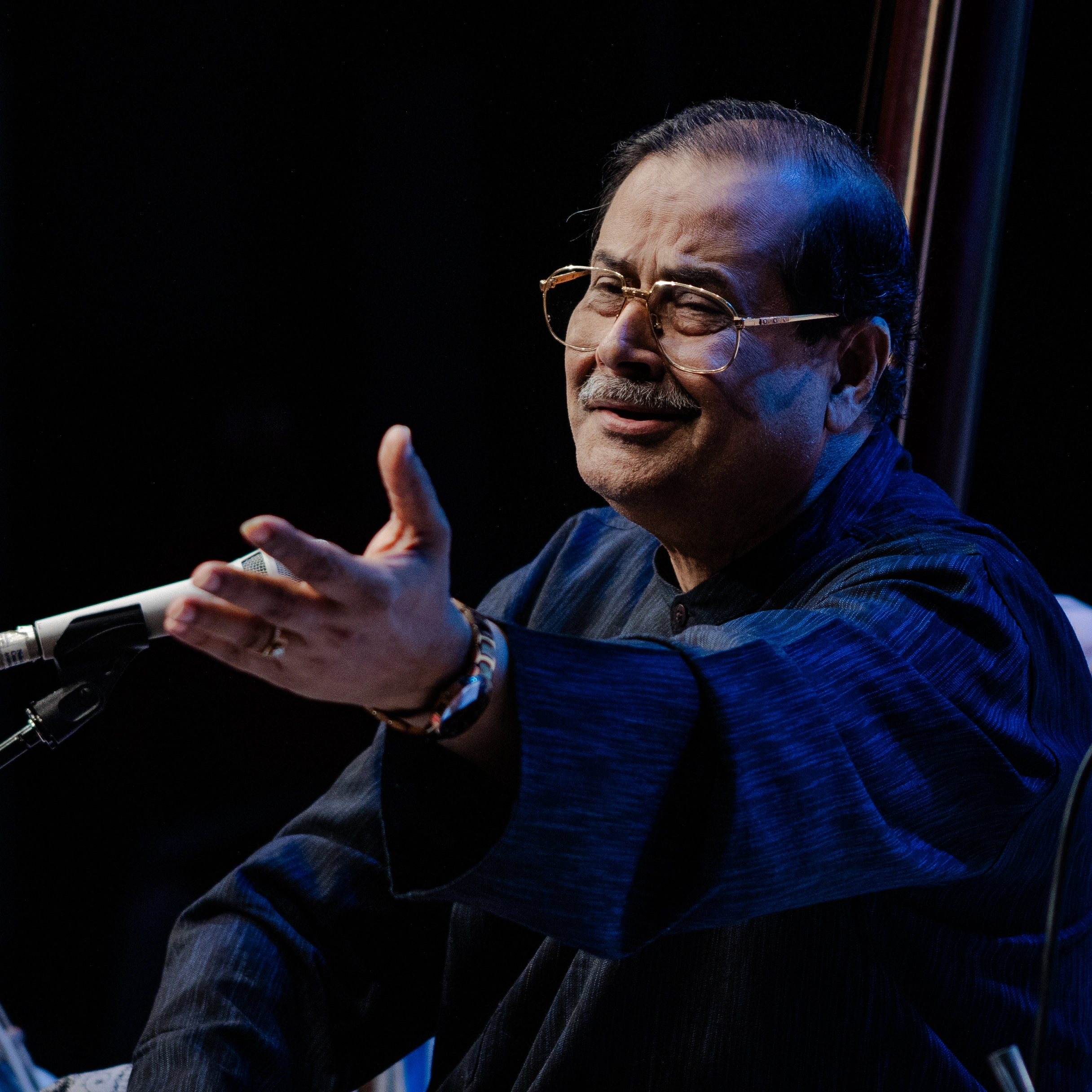
- Born: Ajoy Chakraborty; 25 December 1952 (age 73); Kolkata, West Bengal, India
- Citizenship: Indian
- Occupation: Vocalist
- Spouse: Chandana Chakraborty
- Children: Kaushiki Chakraborty, Ananjan Chakraborty
- Awards: Padma Bhushan (2020)
- Musical career
- Origin: Shyamnagar, West Bengal, India
- Genre: Hindustani classical music
- Years active: 1977–present
- Website: https://ajoychakrabarty.com/

Ajoy Chakraborty (born 25 December 1952) is an Indian classical vocalist, and composer of the Patiala-Kasur gharana. He was awarded with the Padma Bhushan, the third highest civilian award in India in 2020 and the Padma Shri, the fourth highest civilian award in India in 2011.

== Early life ==
Chakraborty was born in Kolkata, West Bengal on 25 December 1952 to Ajit Kumar Chakraborty and Mahamaya Devi.

He graduated his class in music, both in B.A and M.A. from the Rabindra Bharati University in Kolkata and then ITC Sangeet Research Academy in 1977 as its first scholar.

His father, Ajit Chakraborty, was his first music teacher. He then studied with Pannalal Samanta, Kanaidas Bairagi, Munawar Ali Khan and Jnan Prakash Ghosh.

Besides that, he had learnt from Latafat Hussain Khan, Nibruttibua Sarnaik, Hirabai Barodekar and in Carnatic styles from M. Balamuralikrishna. Apart from khyal, he also renders lighter forms such as Thumri, Tappa, Bhajan, Kirtan, Folk, Film/Non-Film and modern songs, in several different languages.

He has received several prestigious awards including the Padma Shri (2011), Sangeet Natak Akademi Award (Delhi, 1999–2000), Kumar Gandharva National Award (1993) and the Best Male Playback Singer Award (Bengali Film "Chhandaneer" 1990) ("For bringing the rare depth of emotion, adorned by his command on the classical idiom") and National Tansen Samman 2015 - by the Chief Minister of Madhya Pradesh. He has also received felicitations from both the former and present Chief Ministers of his own State, West Bengal. In 2012, Chief Minister of West Bengal, Mamata Banerjee conferred him the Maha Sangeet Samman and the Banga Bibhushan, two of the State's highest awards. In 2015 he has received Guru Jnan Prakash Ghosh Lifetime Achievement Award.

He also was awarded honorary citizenship in New Orleans, after performing with jazz musicians at Preservation Hall, the birthplace of jazz music.

He had received his honorary doctorate degree in the presence of Hon'ble Prime Minister Narendra Modi and other dignitaries from IIT Kanpur. He was honored for his exemplary contributions in his respective field.

== Singing career ==
He has been invited to perform in Pakistan and China and by BBC for their Golden Jubilee Celebration of India's Independence.

He has performed in some of the most prestigious venues around the world such as Carnegie Hall, The Kennedy Center, New Orleans Jazz Preservation Hall in the US, the Royal Albert hall and Queen Elizabeth Hall in the UK and Theatre de la Ville in France. In addition to that, Pandit Ajoy Chakraborty performed at the Aga Khan Museum in Toronto, Canada in 2018 for the Raag-Mala Music Society of Toronto.

Inspired by the ideals of his Guru Jnan Prakash Ghosh, Chakraborty founded Shrutinandan, a school of music.

== Personal life ==
Chakraborty is married to Chandana Chakraborty. His daughter, Kaushiki Chakraborty, is also a vocalist of Hindustani classical music. Their son, Ananjan Chakraborty, is a sound engineer. Chakraborty’s younger brother, Sanjay Chakroborty, is a hindustani classical singer and instrumentalist but was arrested in 2024 due to severe child-molestation legal accusations by one of his students.

== Films ==
Year	Song	Film	Co-singer	Composer	Lyricist
1985	Bela Jay Shyamrai	Baidurjya Rahasya	None	Tapan Sinha	Tapan Sinha
1985	Nain Mein Nandalal	Baidurjya Rahasya	None	Tapan Sinha	Tapan Sinha
1999	Ore Jaat Jaat koris kano	Niyoti	None	Manoranjan Saha	Bablu Samaddar
2000	Isaiyil Thodanguthamma	Hey Ram	None	Ilayaraja	Ilayaraja
2000	Har Koi Samjhe	Hey Ram	None	Ilayaraja	Ilayaraja
2001	Aan Milo Sajna	Gadar: Ek Prem Katha	Parveen Sultana	Uttam Singh	Anand Bakshi
2005	Yeh Kaun Mujhe Yaad Aaya	Taj Mahal: An Eternal Love Story	None	Naushad Ali	Naqsh Lyallpuri
2005	Vaishnava Jan To	Water	Kaushiki Desikan	A. R. Rahman,(originally composed by Narsinh Mehta)	Sukhwinder Singh
2011	Bhorer Alo	Bhorer Alo	None	Jeet Gannguli	Priyo Chattopadhyay
2013	Rabso Neha Laage (Bilaval Bandish)	Shunyo Awnko	Kaushiki Desikan	Gautam Ghose	Gautam Ghose
2020	Garaj Garaj	Bandish Bandits	None	Shankar–Ehsaan–Loy	Sameer Samant
2023	Dawsh Awbotaar Stotra	Dawshom Awbotaar	None	Anupam Roy	Joydeb

== Awards ==
- National Award – 1989
- Kumar Gandharva Award – 1993
- Sangeet Natak Akademi award – 2000
- Padmashree – 2011
- Banga Bibhushan – 2012
- Alva's Virasat Award – 2012
- Tansen Samman - 2015
- Pandit Omkarnath Thakur Shastriya Sangeet Award - 2014 - 2015
- Padma Bhushan 2020
