= Dover Lane Music Conference =

Indian classical music festival

The Dover Lane Music Conference
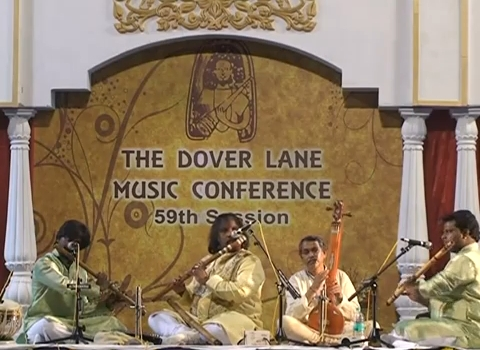
- Performance at the Dover Lane Music Conference
- Genre: Classical
- Dates: 22 January to 25/26
- Locations: Nazrul Mancha, Kolkata, India
- Years active: 1952 - Present
- Website: doverlanemusicconference.org

The Dover Lane Music Conference is an annual Indian classical music festival held in the month of January at Nazrul Mancha, an indoor 2400-seat auditorium in south Kolkata. The Dover Lane Music Conference is an all night concert attended by visitors from all over the world. It typically showcases vocal recital, sitar, sarod, and violin music.

== History ==
The festival derives its name from the fact that it originally took place at a location on Dover Lane courtesy the patronage of Late Sri Narendra Singh Singhi at his residence, Singhi Park.

== See also ==
- List of Indian classical music festivals
- Swara Samrat festival
