= Mahesh Raghvan =

Indian musician

- Genres: Carnatic classical music, Fusion
- Occupations: Musician, Producer, Songwriter
- Instruments: Keyboards, Violin
- Website: maheshraghvan.com

Mahesh Raghvan is a Mumbai-based Carnatic (South Indian Classical) music fusion artist. He is known for playing Carnatic music on the iPad on an app named GeoShred.

== Education ==
Mahesh Raghvan completed his MSc in digital composition and performance from the University of Edinburgh in the United Kingdom. He obtained a bachelor's degree in audio production from the Dubai campus of the SAE Institute.

== Personal life ==
Mahesh married a well-known Indian violinist (Hindustani), Nandini Shankar on 9 May 2021.

== Musical career ==
Mahesh gained popularity through his YouTube channel, which he created in July 2014. Where he releases Carnatic fusion music and Indian style covers of pop music. With over 500,000 subscribers today, his videos have garnered millions of views. He became known for his ability to play Carnatic Music on the iPad application GeoShred. He is the creative director of IndianRaga, an organization that promotes Indian Fine Arts. Mahesh has over 500,000 streams on Spotify as of December 2019.

He has collaborated with the likes of Ranjani-Gayatri, Aruna Sairam, P. Unnikrishnan, and Jordan Rudess. Mahesh is part of two bands: Carnatic 2.0 with violinist Shravan Sridhar and The Thayir Sadam Project with vocalist Bindu Subramaniam, violinist Ambi Subramaniam and percussionist Akshay Anantapadmanabhan.

== Reception ==
Mahesh Raghvan is an Indian music fusion artist who performs traditional Carnatic music using digital instruments and music software.

"Raghvan is a carnatic music fusion performer who has gained notoriety for experimenting with classical music. Those experiments have garnered him millions of views on YouTube and Facebook, as fans watch Raghvan perform on his iPad. He’s also tackled modern songs and transformed them into classical Indian music."

"A Carnatic fusion artiste, Mahesh has been gaining enormous popularity, especially among the millennials, for his hip, foot-tapping Carnatic versions of popular songs — some of which are arguably better than the original compositions."

"From Adele’s Hello to the epic soundtrack of Game of Thrones, 26-year-old Mahesh Raghvan continues to infuse Carnatic wonder into popular mainstream hits. Most of his tracks have garnered over a million views each on social media platforms"
