= NA-35 Kohat =

Constituency of the National Assembly of Pakistan

- Constituency for the National Assembly of Pakistan
- Region: Kohat District
- Electorate: 666,237

Current constituency
- Party: Pakistan Tehreek-e-Insaf
- Member: Shehryar Afridi
- Created from: NA-32 Kohat

NA-35 Kohat (این اے-35، کوہاٹ) is a constituency for the National Assembly of Pakistan. It covers tho whole of district Kohat. The constituency was formerly known as NA-14 Kohat from 1977 to 2018. The name changed to NA-32 Kohat after the delimitation in 2018 and to NA-35 Kohat after the delimitation in 2022.

== Members of Parliament ==
=== 1988–2002: NA-9 Kohat ===
Election	Member	Party
1988	Moulvi Naimatullah	IJI
1990	Syed Iftikhar Hussain Gillani	PDA
1993	Syed Iftikhar Hussain Gillani	PML-N
1997	Haji Javed Ibrahim Piracha	PML-N

=== 2002–2018: NA-14 Kohat ===
Election	Member	Party
2002	Mufti Ibrar Sultan	MMA
2008	Dilawar Shah	ANP
2013	Shehryar Afridi	PTI

=== 2018–2023: NA-32 Kohat ===
Election	Member	Party
2018	Shehryar Afridi	PTI

=== 2024–present: NA-35 Kohat ===
Election	Member	Party
2024	Shehryar Afridi	PTI

== Elections since 2002 ==
=== 2002 general election ===
2002 General Election: NA-14 Kohat
Party	Candidate	Votes	%	±%
MMA	Mufti Ibrar Sultan	46,130	48.14	
PML-Q	Syed Iftikhar Hussain Gillani	14,277	14.90	
Independent	Shehryar Khan Afridi	12,083	12.61	
ANP	Fazal Rahim Khattak	11,299	11.79	
PPPP	Saifullah Khan Khattak Advocate	7,205	7.52	
PML-N	Javed Ibrahim Paracha	3,712	2.83	
National Alliance	Shah Baz Gul Shinwari	1,520	1.59	
Pak Watan Party	Syed Mazher Ali Shah	599	0.62	
Majority		31,853	33.24	
Turnout		95,825	31.40	
MMA gain from PML-N				

A total of 3,748 votes were rejected.

=== 2008 general election ===
2008 General Election: NA-14 Kohat
Party	Candidate	Votes	%	±%
ANP	Dilawar Shah	30,681	31.11	+19.32
Independent	Malak Mohammad Asad Khan	23,030	23.35	
Independent	Syed Iftikhar Hussain Gillani	17,466	17.71	
MMA	Molana Abdul Hai	10,573	10.72	−37.42
PPPP	Abdul Rauf Advocate	8,421	8.54	+1.02
Independent	Qari Ubaidullah Haidri	6,774	6.87	
PML-N	Javaid Ibrahim Paracha	1,292	1.31	−1.52
Independent	Pir Hafiz Khurshid Ali Khan	215	0.22	
MQM	Shahid Khan Advocate	166	0.17	
Majority		7,651	7.76	
Turnout		98,618	28.41	−2.99
ANP gain from MMA				

A total of 3,029 votes were rejected.

=== 2013 general election ===
2013 General Election: NA-14 Kohat
Party	Candidate	Votes	%	±%
PTI	Shehryar Afridi	68,129	40.04	
JUI-F	Gohar Mohammad Khan Bangesh	32,041	18.83	
Independent	Shammim Afridi	19,135	11.25	
PML-N	Malik Muhammad Asad Khan	13,789	8.10	+6.79
PPPP	Dilawar Shah	10,041	5.90	−2.64
MDM	Ubaid Ullah	9,209	5.41	
ANP	Kursheed Begum Saeed	7,211	4.24	−26.87
Independent	Badshah Gul	4,814	2.83	
JI	Syed Mohammed Faheem	3,558	2.09	
TTP	Asif Iqbal	498	0.29	
Independent	Mohammad Ihsanullah	471	0.28	
QWP (S)	Najeebullah Durrani	414	0.24	
PkMAP	Mohammad Nawaz Khan	312	0.18	
Independent	Nazia Zulfiqar	254	0.15	
Independent	Sher Rehman	159	0.09	
MQM	Abdul Qadeer Khan	130	0.08	−0.09
Majority		36,088	21.21	
Turnout		170,165	42.68	+14.27
PTI gain from ANP				

A total of 5,600 votes were rejected.

=== 2018 general election ===
General elections were held on 25 July 2018.

General election 2018: NA-32 (Kohat)
Party	Candidate	Votes	%	±%
PTI	Shehryar Afridi	82,248	43.14	
MMA	Gohar Muhammad Khan Bangash	47,412	24.87	
PML(N)	Abbas Khan Afridi	44,154	23.16	
Others	Others (seven candidates)	16,844	8.83	
Turnout		197,343	38.95	
Total valid votes		190,658	96.61	
Rejected ballots		6,685	3.39	
Majority		34,836	18.27	
Registered electors		506,699		
PTI hold		Swing	N/A	

=== 2024 general election ===
General elections were held on 8 February 2024. Shehryar Afridi won the election with 128,594 votes.

General election 2024: NA-35 Kohat
Party	Candidate	Votes	%	±%
PTI	Shehryar Afridi (Note: Filed nomination papers as PTI candidate but ECP allowed him to run as an Independent)	128,594	52.68	▲9.54
PML(N)	Abbas Khan Afridi	59,034	24.18	▲1.02
JUI (F)	Gohar Muhammad Khan Bangash	44,380	18.18	N/A
Others	Others (fifteen candidates)	12,111	4.96	
Turnout		249,848	37.50	▼1.45
Total valid votes		244,119	97.71	
Rejected ballots		5,729	2.29	
Majority		69,560	28.49	▲10.22
Registered electors		666,239		

== See also ==
- NA-34 Nowshera-II
- NA-36 Hangu-cum-Orakzai
