= Shafqat Amanat Ali =

Pakistani singer, songwriter, composer

Shafqat Amanat Ali Khan PP
- شفقت امانت علی خان
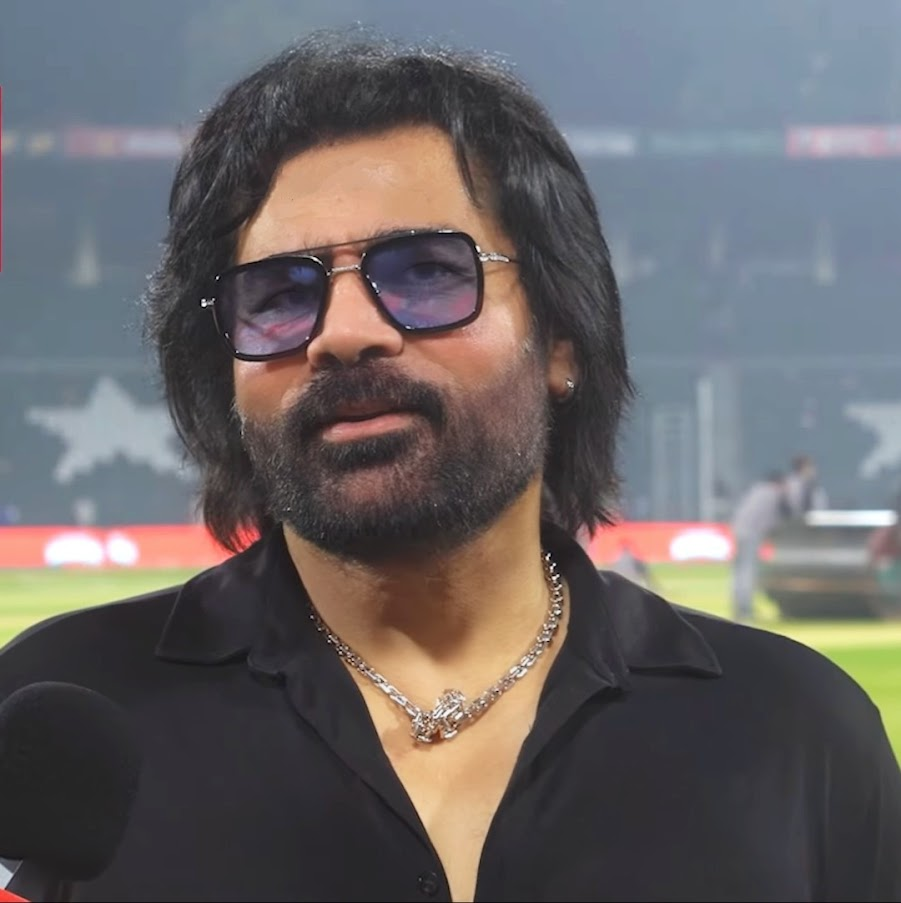
- Ali at Gaddafi Stadium, Lahore, March 2023
- Born: 26 February 1965 (age 61); Lahore, Punjab, Pakistan
- Education: Government College University, Lahore
- Occupations: Singer; songwriter; composer
- Years active: 2000–present
- Father: Amanat Ali Khan
- Relatives: Bade Fateh Ali Khan (uncle); Hamid Ali Khan (uncle); Asad Amanat Ali Khan (brother)
- Family: Patiala Gharana
- Awards: Pride of Performance by President of Pakistan (2008); Lifetime Achievement Honour by Government College University, Lahore (2023); Lifetime Achievement Award by Arts Council of Pakistan Karachi (2024)
- Musical career
- Genres: Pop; Sufi; filmi; playback singing; sentimental ballad; folk; ghazal; Hindustani classical; semi-classical
- Instrument: Vocals
- Labels: Virgin Records; Fire Records; Times Music; Sony Music India; Zee Music Company; T-Series; Universal Music India; Venus Music; Tips Music; EMI Pakistan; Empire Music; Merchant Records; Frequency Media; Mainstage Productions; Music Today; Sufiscore
- Formerly of: Fuzön
- Website: beacons.ai/shafqatamanatali

Shafqat Amanat Ali Khan PP (Urdu: شفقت امانت علی خان; pronounced [ˈʃəfkət əˈmaːnət əˈliː xaːn]; born 26 February 1965) is a Pakistani pop and classical singer, songwriter, and composer belonging to the Patiala Gharana tradition of music. He was the lead vocalist of the Pakistani pop rock band Fuzön until 2006 and is a prominent playback singer in the Pakistani television industry. The youngest son of noted classical vocalist Ustad Amanat Ali Khan, Ali started his musical training at the age of four under the tutelage of his uncle, Ustad Bade Fateh Ali Khan, who was widely regarded as the foremost exponent of Hindustani classical music in Pakistan.

Ali rose to prominence in both India and Pakistan with the lead single "Aankhon Ke Saagar" and the song "Khamaj" (also known as "Mora Saiyaan") from Fuzön's debut album, Saagar (2002). In 2006, Ali went on to achieve breakthrough success in Bollywood with two songs – "Mitwa" (from the film Kabhi Alvida Naa Kehna) and "Yeh Honsla" (from the film Dor). Both songs earned Ali significant commercial success and critical acclaim, and helped him quickly establish himself as a playback singer in the Indian film industry. Since his Bollywood debut with "Mitwa," Ali has sung prolifically for Bollywood film soundtracks, with "Bin Tere" (I Hate Luv Storys), "Kyun Main Jaagoon" (Patiala House), "Dildaara" (Ra.One), "Phir Le Aya Dil" (Barfi!), "Tu Hi Mera" (Jannat 2), and "Darmiyaan" (Jodi Breakers) being some of his most popular Hindi film songs.

Ali is well known for his numerous live performances in Coke Studio Pakistan where he has collaborated with Rohail Hyatt and Strings (among others) and has performed original music composed for Coke Studio as well as modified renditions of his own songs. His three solo albums – Tabeer (2008), Kyun Dooriyan (2010), and Muh Dikhai (2015) – were well received in both India and Pakistan. Ali is particularly noted for his Sufi style of singing, and several of his songs feature mystical themes and references to Sufi philosophies. In 2015–16, he served as a judge and coach on Zee TV's Asia's Singing Superstar along with Shankar Mahadevan.

Ali was awarded the highest national literary award of Pakistan, the Presidential Pride of Performance, on 23 March 2008 for his contributions to the arts, making him the sixth person in his family to receive the honour. On 21 March 2023, Ali was given the Lifetime Achievement Honour by his alma mater, Government College University, Lahore. According to data released by Spotify in 2022 and 2023, Ali is among the most streamed Pakistani artistes in the world. On 27 January 2024, Ali was given the Lifetime Achievement Award by the Arts Council of Pakistan Karachi.

== Early life and background ==
Shafqat Amanat Ali was born into a Punjabi Muslim family in Lahore, Pakistan to noted classical singer, Ustad Amanat Ali Khan and his wife Almas Amanat Ali Khan, on 26 February 1965, making him the seventh generation of the Patiala Gharana, which was founded in the mid-late 19th century by his great-grandfather, Ali Baksh 'Jarnail' Khan. He is one of seven siblings, the youngest brother of prominent vocalist Asad Amanat Ali Khan, and nephew to renowned Patiala Gharana exponents, Ustad Bade Fateh Ali Khan and Ustad Hamid Ali Khan.

=== Musical training and influences ===
Being born into a traditional vocal gharana, Ali has shared that music was his "only calling in life" and that he always aspired to become a singer because he wanted to carry forward his family's musical legacy. Ali began training in classical music at the age of four and has stated that he "never had to look outside [the] home for musical influences." He considers his grandmother his first teacher and lists his grandfather, Ustad Akhtar Hussain as his guru, recollecting that his earliest memory is of his grandfather teaching him a composition as a three-year-old. Referring to his initial training with his grandmother, Ali narrates, "The discipline she inculcated in me and the way in which she passed on anecdotes of ragas led me to an understanding of each bandish." Ali completed his musical training primarily under the tutelage of his uncle, Ustad Bade Fateh Ali Khan, but has stated that he learned music from his brothers, sisters, and aunts as well.

Ali was only nine years old when he lost his father, but considers him his greatest inspiration and influence in his craft and creative process. In an interview, while referring to his father, he revealed: "I have always wanted to be like him, sing like him, look like him. He is my inspiration. It is a compliment for me if someone says that I sound like him." Ali has also shared that some of his vocal techniques are inspired by his older brother, Asad Amanat Ali Khan: "I have borrowed a few things from him which I incorporate both in my performances and songwriting. Since we both followed our father, sometimes people say that I sound both like my father and brother, and this makes me particularly happy."

Ali has described his upbringing as being fairly strict and recalls that he (along with his brothers and cousins) was expected to train rigorously and do riyaz (practice) for several hours a day as a child — around four training sessions a day every two hours. He notes: "Growing up, music was all around us day in and day out and every elder could correct us and guide us. The endless practice sessions seemed boring and tedious as a child. Each nuance had to be practiced again and again, till we could perfect it as per the standards of our elders. And they would then command us to practice some more. The practice had to be done sitting cross-legged on the floor and one's legs would hurt. It was both emotionally and physically draining, but in hindsight this was a small price to pay for achieving perfection in our art."

Similarly, in another interview, Ali stated: "we were constantly given feedback on our singing...which continued for seven to eight hours per day or basically anytime we were not in school. Everyone in the family knew music so anyone who would pass by and hear me doing riyaz would correct me if I was going wrong or attempting something difficult." Ali has mentioned that although growing up in a family of distinguished singers and musicians helped him learn music well and hone his vocal skills, it also created myriad expectations and pressures, stating: "Being someone from Patiala Gharana is not easy. People expect a lot from you and there is [a] lot of pressure to live up to that."

Exposed to numerous genres of music from a young age, Ali gravitated towards Sufi music fairly early on, drawn to its emphasis on humanism, spirituality, peace, and tolerance. He recalls visiting and spending time in various dargahs as a child and being enthralled by qawwali and other forms of devotional music being sung by Sufi practitioners. Ali asserts that these early experiences with Sufi expression and philosophies helped him develop his own approach to music later in life.

Ali has mentioned in various interviews that he is an admirer of Bade Ghulam Ali Khan, Pandit Jasraj, Ravi Shankar, Manna Dey, S. D. Burman, R. D. Burman, and Roshan Ara Begum, and he lists Kishore Kumar, Mohammed Rafi, Lata Mangeshkar, and Asha Bhonsle as his favourite playback singers.

=== Education ===
Ali attended Rang Mahal Mission High School and Sacred Heart High School in Lahore and describes himself as an average student. He earned his bachelor's degree in 1988 from Government College University, Lahore. He regularly took part in music competitions while in high school, and as a college student, performed regularly in music festivals and shows in Lahore and beyond, quickly establishing himself in the local music scene.

Ali notes that listening to The Beatles, Pink Floyd, The Doors, and Michael Jackson while in college was especially impactful for him, helping him learn how to dissect rhythm, explore similarities across musical genres, and fuse them together. He describes that "there was a sense of adventure [in] listening to these divergent sounds" and that "when I would hear these western songs, I would often do alap over [them] and incorporate classical improvisations [in]to these songs." Ali was the first person in his family to go to college and graduated with the Roll of Honour from the Music Society of Government College University, in addition to being the college colour-holder in music.

== Career ==
=== 2001–2004: Career beginnings, Fuzön, and rise to prominence ===
After graduating from college, Ali worked briefly as a high school music teacher in Lahore. Subsequently, he moved to Karachi, Pakistan to work with various composers, producers, and music arrangers to get his first music album off the ground. He describes this period of his life as a time of struggle and remembers sleeping many a night inside vocal booths and in the lobbies of recording studios. Due to several issues, his initial album did not eventually receive a release by the record label he had been working with. During this period, he sang numerous jingles for TV commercials while simultaneously continuing to work on his own music, recalling in an interview, "I cannot forget my days of struggle in Karachi, I did everything that came my way, right from singing jingles to voiceovers and every other odd job related to singing." Ali recollects that at this stage of his career as a struggling artiste, he was grateful for the support extended to him by his older brother, Asad.

It was during this time that Ali met his soon-to-be bandmates, and together they went on to form the pop rock band Fuzön in 2001. Ali describes that the name of the band was a reference to their unique brand of music that 'fused' together elements of modern pop rock with traditional Hindustani classical, Pakistani folk, and Sufi music. "Aankhon Ke Saagar" was the first song to be composed and recorded for their debut album Saagar (2002, Empire Music and Virgin Records), followed by "Khamaj" ("Mora Saiyaan"), and both songs went on to become enormously popular in both Pakistan and neighbouring India. The songs "Khamaj (Mora Saiyaan)" and "Teray Bina" from Saagar were featured in the soundtrack of Nagesh Kukunoor's 2004 film, Hyderabad Blues 2. Saagar also made history by becoming the first studio album to be released by a band simultaneously in both India and Pakistan.

=== 2006: Breakthrough in Bollywood and rising popularity ===
Ali was introduced to the Indian film industry by singer and music composer Shankar Mahadevan. One morning while driving to his studio, Mahadevan heard "Aankhon Ke Saagar" on the radio and immediately called the radio jockey who was his friend, to get Ali's contact information. Ali eventually went on to sing the massively popular Sufi rock ballad "Mitwa," composed by Shankar–Ehsaan–Loy for the soundtrack of the film Kabhi Alvida Naa Kehna (2006). The song topped musical charts across India and received widespread critical acclaim, helping propel Ali into stardom. The same year, Ali also sang the song "Yeh Honsla" (composed by Salim–Sulaiman) from the Hindi film Dor. Ali garnered significant critical acclaim for this song, which he described as "simple, uncomplicated and serene – a true prayer to the soul."

Since his Bollywood debut with Mitwa, Ali has worked prolifically as a playback singer for Hindi films, with "Bin Tere" (I Hate Luv Storys), "Phir Le Aya Dil" (Barfi!), "Teri Jhuki Nazar" (Murder 3), "Dildaara" (Ra.One), "Darmiyaan" (Jodi Breakers), "Kyun Main Jagoon" (Patiala House), "Tu Hi Mera" (Jannat 2), and "Tere Naina" (My Name Is Khan) being some of his most popular Hindi film songs. Ali collaborates frequently with Indian film composers Pritam, Shankar–Ehsaan–Loy, Vishal–Shekhar, and Salim–Sulaiman.

=== 2008: First solo album and notable collaborations ===
After leaving the band Fuzön in 2006, Ali began to focus on his solo career as a vocalist. Based on folk and Sufi works, his debut solo album Tabeer was commissioned by the Music Today label and released in September 2008. Billboard magazine described the album as a modern reworking of "traditional Sufi poetry." The video of the lead single of the album, "Khaireyan De Naal," was aired on all music channels in India and Pakistan. Ali composed and sang a modified version of this song for the Bollywood movie Tevar in 2015. In 2008, Ali sang the songs "Phir Wohi Raastey" and "Allah Megh De" for the multi-award-winning Pakistani film Ramchand Pakistani which highlighted the plight of cross-border prisoners in both India and Pakistan.

Also in 2008, Ali wrote, composed, and sang the song "Paiman" to raise awareness about maternal and neonatal health and wellbeing. The song and its music video were part of a USAID-funded health communication initiative called PAIMAN (Pakistan Initiative for Mothers and Newborns), with partner support from the Johns Hopkins University Center for Communication Programs and Aga Khan University among others. The same year, Ali collaborated with Strings, Shuja Haider, Hadiqa Kiani, and Ali Zafar (among others) on a song called "Yeh Hum Naheen," (transl. this is not who we are) which was part of an anti-terrorism campaign aimed at projecting a softer and positive image of Pakistan and Islam to other nations. The song led to a record-breaking 62.8 million Pakistanis signing a petition to uphold the message of the campaign.

=== 2009–2011: Second solo album and work in Coke Studio ===
In 2009, Ali featured prominently in Season 2 of Coke Studio Pakistan, where he performed three of his songs — "Khamaaj," "Aankhon Ke Saagar," and "Ajab Khail" — with variations in arrangement and orchestration, produced by Rohail Hyatt, the co-creator of Coke Studio. In the same season, he also sang the song "Mahi Ve," for which he collaborated with the Canadian Bhangra band Josh.

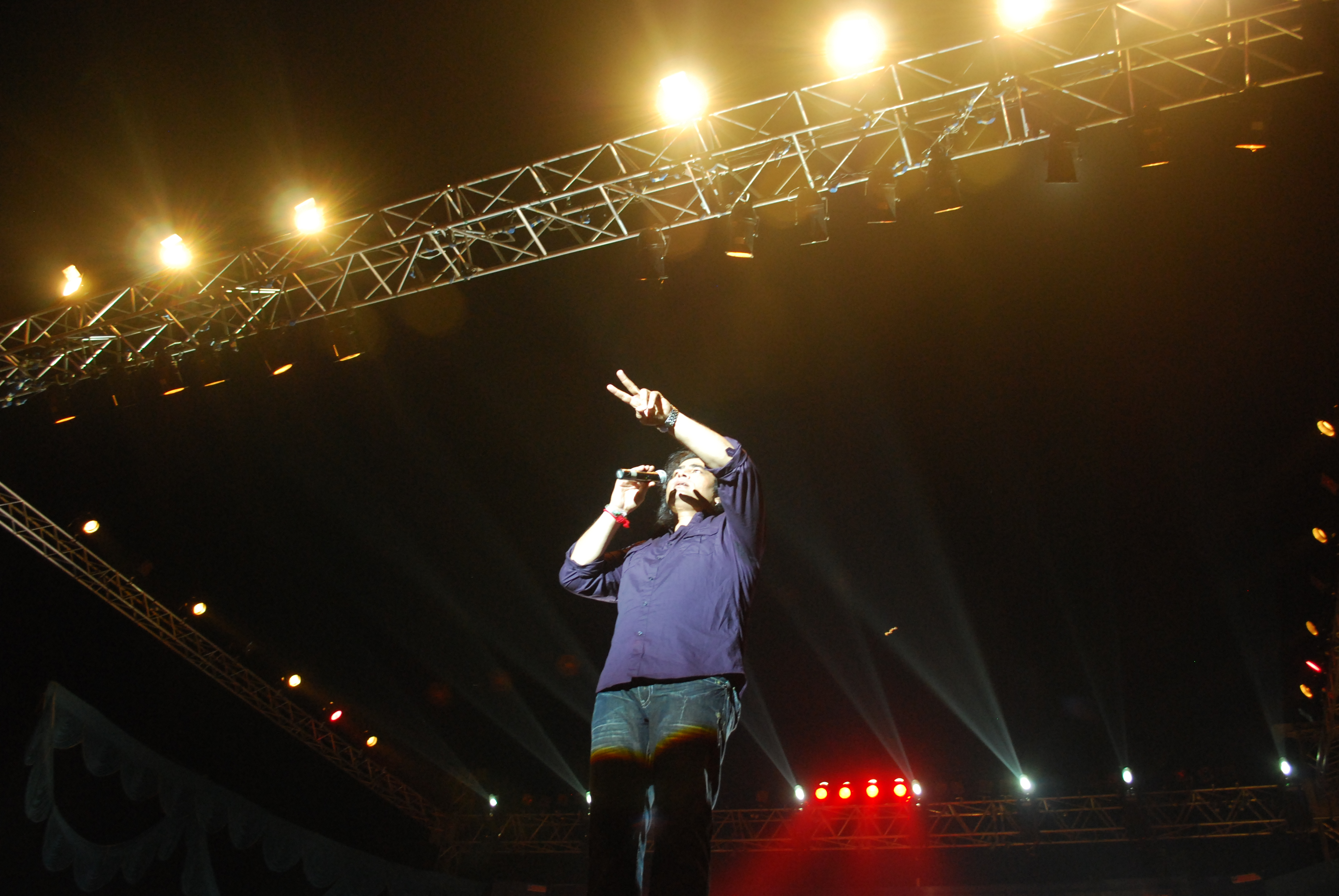
Ali performing at IIT-Kanpur, Uttar Pradesh, India (2010)

Ali released his second solo album Kyun Dooriyan in 2010, under the Music Today label. It included a couple of songs — "Paharhi" and "Naal Naal" — he had written and composed during his time with Fuzön, which he revamped for the album. Kyun Dooriyan was a stylistic departure for Ali in that many of its songs had a distinct rock feel, compared to his previous album, Tabeer, which was significantly mellower in tone and thematically more spiritual. The title track of the album, "Kyun Dooriyan," was initially written as a love song, but Ali eventually reworked it as a message of peace and reconciliation between India and Pakistan. The song received a nomination in the 'Indie Pop Song of the Year' category at the 3rd Mirchi Music Awards in 2011, as did the romantic ballad "Mahiya."

In 2011, Ali appeared in Season 1 of Coke Studio India, where he sang four songs produced by Leslee Lewis, including modified renditions of "Akhian" (from Saagar) and "Kya Haal Sunawan" (from Kyun Dooriyan). The same year, he also wrote, composed, and sang the song "Yahaan," which was aimed at highlighting the natural beauty and diversity of the Gilgit-Baltistan region and promoting cultural tourism in the area.

=== 2012–2015: Third solo album and work in MTV Unplugged ===
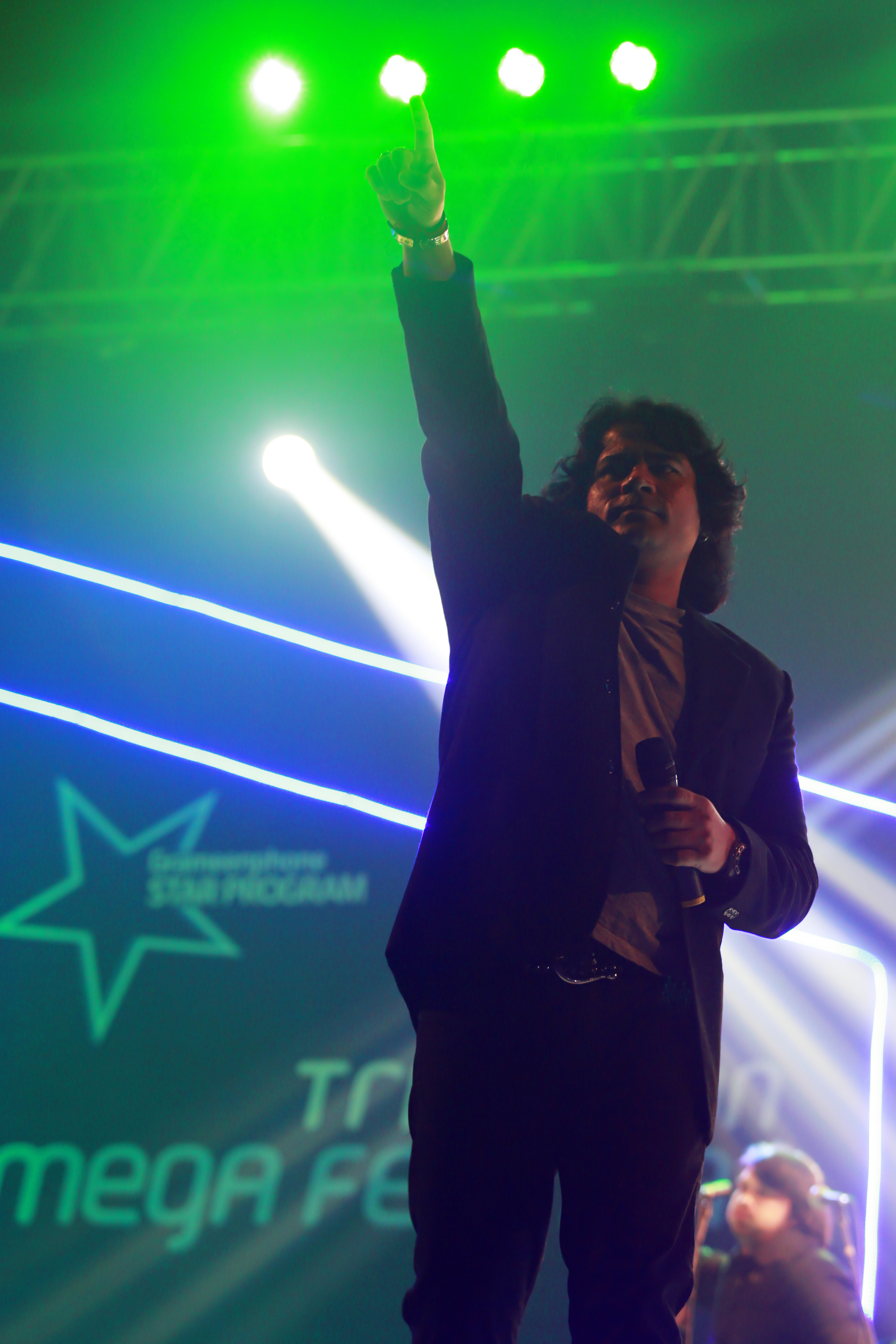
Ali performing at the Tri Nation Mega Festival, Dhaka, Bangladesh (2012)

In 2012, Ali performed six songs on MTV Unplugged India (Season 2), including reinterpreted versions of "Aankhon Ke Saagar," "Khamaj (Mora Saiyaan)", and "Yeh Honsla." He also wrote and performed a new song — "Manmaniyan" — in the same season, composed by noted film score composer Ranjit Barot, a long-time associate of A. R. Rahman.

In 2014, Ali sang the song "Jeenay Chaley" for the soundtrack of the critically acclaimed film Dukhtar which criticised the practice of child marriage in Pakistan. The film was Pakistan's official submission for Best Foreign Language Film at the 87th Academy Awards in 2015.

Shafqat Amanat Ali's third solo album Muh Dikhai: Unveiling The Songs Of Eternal Love was released in March 2015 under the Times Music label and included songs in both Hindi and Punjabi languages. The album featured an assortment of sentimental ballads, pop, and Sufi devotional songs. Ali did not focus on any specific genre for this album, choosing to experiment with orchestration and arrangements instead. The album included a reimagined rendition of the popular ghazal, "Dil Dharhaknay Ka Sabab," originally composed by Ali's father, Ustad Amanat Ali Khan, and written by prominent Pakistani poet Nasir Kazmi, with veteran Indian actor Naseeruddin Shah featuring in the music video. The album also included the Sufi track "Rang," for which Ali adapted the well-known qawwali, Aaj Rang Hai, written by the 13th-century Sufi poet Amir Khusrau.

=== 2017: Return to Coke Studio ===
In 2017, after a long hiatus from Coke Studio, Ali appeared again in Season 10 and performed several songs: "Allahu Akbar" (a traditional hamd written, composed, and directed by Shuja Haider) and "Maula Tera Noor" and "Bol" (both composed by Shani Arshad). Ali sang "Bol" as a musical tribute to eminent Pakistani poet Faiz Ahmed Faiz, and received particular praise and critical acclaim for his dynamic vocal performance and versatility in "Allahu Akbar." He also sang the national anthem of Pakistan in the same season, along with Rahat Fateh Ali Khan, Ali Sethi, Aima Baig, Quartulain Balouch, Shuja Haider, Sahir Ali Bagga, and Ahmed Jahanzeb among others. All four songs were produced by Strings. Reflecting on the legacy of Coke Studio Pakistan and his own contributions to it, Ali remarked: "Coke Studio has played a big part in promoting Pakistani music globally. They've managed to bring our forte and our specialty to attention; these are the sounds that make Pakistani music different."

=== 2018–2019: Notable performances and work with United Nations Pakistan ===
On the occasion of Mahatma Gandhi's 150th birth anniversary in October 2018, the Indian Ministry of External Affairs commissioned and released a medley of Gandhi's favourite bhajan, "Vaishnava Jana To," featuring 124 artistes from 124 countries. Ali represented Pakistan in the medley, paying homage to Gandhi, and stated: "this is a gesture of peace and the first step towards dialogue for peace. There are a lot of people...working for peace in both the countries because, at the end of the day, war doesn't do good to any country. I thought this is going to be a good way to melt [the] ice between both the countries."

In 2019, on the occasion of Iqbal Day, Ali performed Allama Muhammad Iqbal's celebrated verse, "Khudi Ka Sirr-e-Nihan," at the historic Lahore Fort in honour of the celebrated poet and philosopher. To commemorate International Youth Day in Pakistan in 2019, Ali sang the song "Aao Badlein Ik Achhey Kal Ke Liye" (transl. let’s change for a better future), commissioned by United Nations Pakistan to affirm Pakistan's commitment to the 2030 Agenda for Sustainable Development and its Sustainable Development Goals (SDGs). The song and its music video portrayed Pakistani youth as agents of social change and focused specifically on the issues of equity and inclusivity in education, poverty eradication, and gender equality.

=== 2020–present: Notable singles and fifth album ===
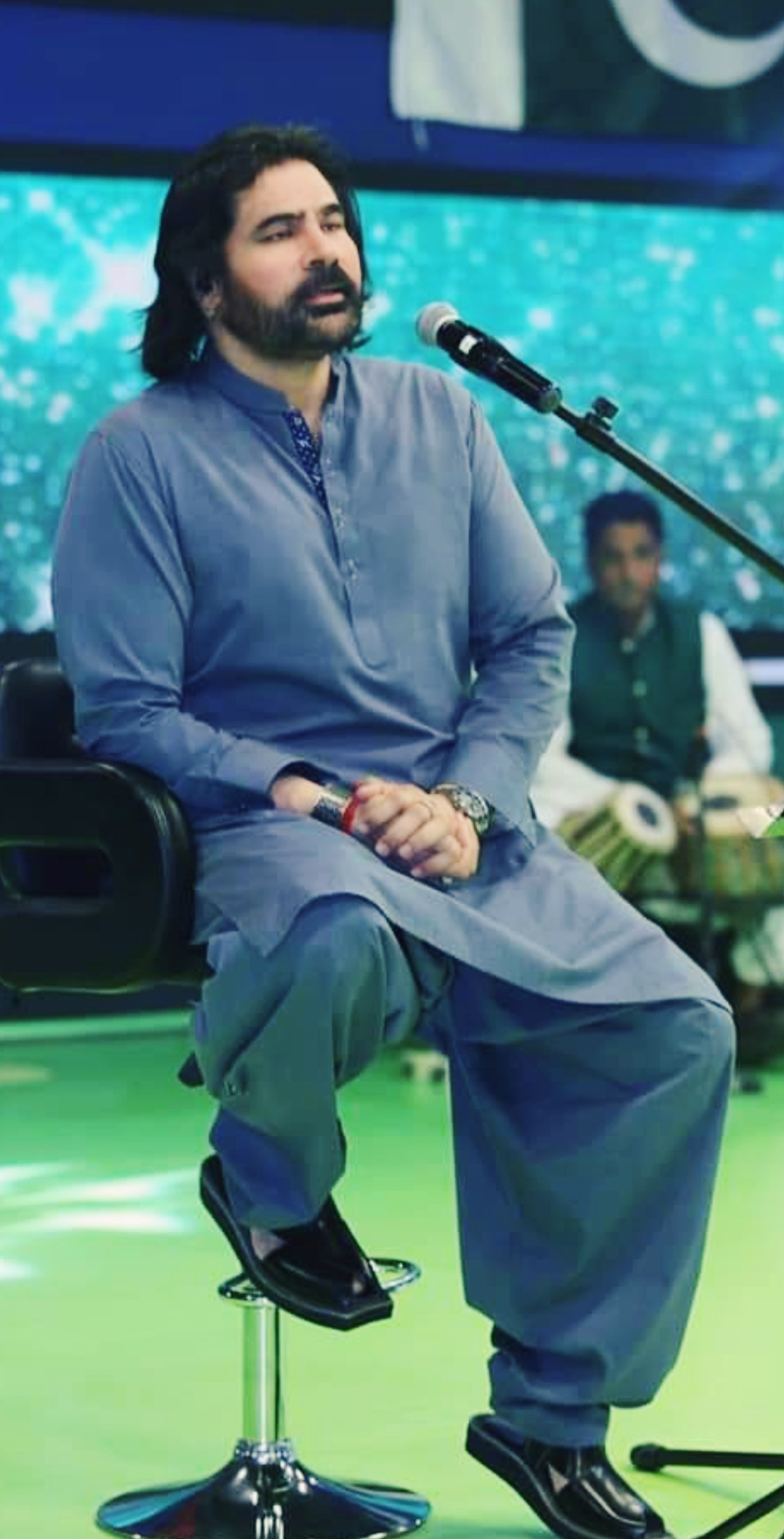
Ali performing on Pakistan Day, March 2020

In 2020, Ali released a number of singles under the newly established UK-based South Asian record label Sufiscore, which was founded during the COVID-19 pandemic. Notable among these singles were "Lassi" and "Main Kya Janu," the latter being a musical tribute to Indian singer K.L. Saigal. Also in 2020, under the Sufiscore label, Ali collaborated with classical vocalist Shafqat Ali Khan for a song titled "Shafqat with Shafqat," with the musical score being produced by the Budapest Symphony Orchestra. The same year, in response to the COVID-19 lockdown in Pakistan, Ali released a prayer song titled "Hey Daata," which was an adaptation of a song originally composed and sung by his father Ustad Amanat Ali Khan during a period of drought in the subcontinent in the 1960s.

In 2021, on the occasion of Pakistan's Defence Day, Ali collaborated with singers Abida Parveen and Sajjad Ali for a patriotic song titled "Mader-e-Meherban" which was released by ISPR, the media wing of the Pakistan Armed Forces.

On 30 September 2022, Ali released his fifth album titled A Tribute to Legends: Ghulam Ali under the Sufiscore label. The album included seven songs — covers of originals sung by Ghulam Ali and Noor Jehan — including "Bhul Jaan Sab Gham Duniya De" and "Jo Na Mil Sake Wohi Bewafa." Ali stated that his goal with this album was to revive classic melodies and pay tribute to the forgotten composers and music producers of Pakistan who "never really got the attention and kind of fame they deserved."

In December 2022, Ali sang the theme song for the launch of Green Entertainment — a new television channel in Pakistan — along with Abida Parveen, Atif Aslam, Rahat Fateh Ali Khan and others.

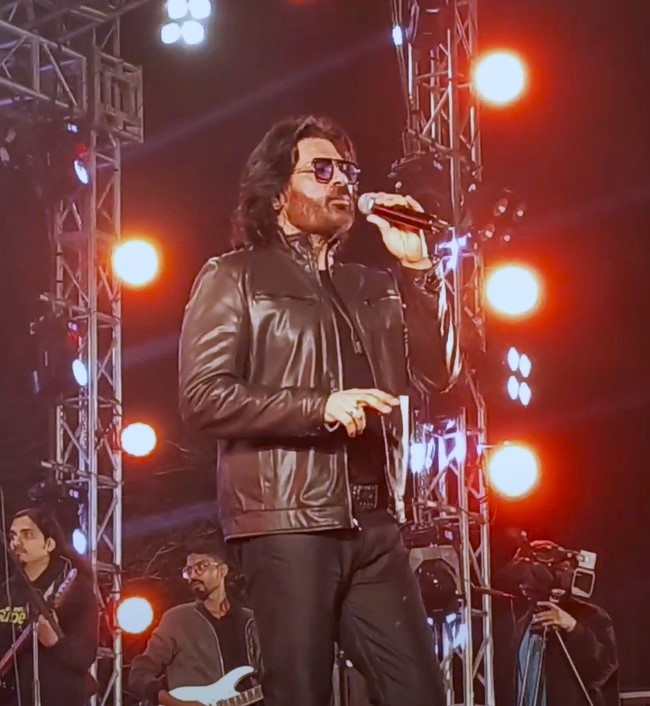
Ali performing at the Arts Council of Pakistan Karachi, January 2024

In January 2023, Ali collaborated on a song titled "Rabb" (transl. God) with Indian singers Rekha Bhardwaj and Tochi Raina and Pakistani singer Nirmala Maghani as part of the launch of Shaan-e-Pakistan Music League — an international music summit. The song focused on themes of religious harmony, peace, and unity. In February 2023, Ali performed at the 7th International Faiz Festival in Lahore. In March 2023, Ali performed at the closing ceremony of the 2023 Pakistan Super League, ahead of the final played between Lahore Qalandars and Multan Sultans at Gaddafi Stadium, Lahore.

In August 2023, Ali was among the headliners at the annual music program of the Canadian National Exhibition held at the CNE Bandshell in Toronto. The same month, Ali released the single "Laghzish-e-Mastana," his first duet with noted Sufi singer Abida Parveen.

In January 2024, Ali performed at the first alumni festival of the Arts Council of Pakistan, Karachi where he was also honoured with the Lifetime Achievement Award.

In May 2024, Ali collaborated again with the UK-based label Sufiscore to release a cover of the popular devotional song "Allah Tero Naam," written by Sahir Ludhianvi and originally sung by Lata Mangeshkar for the soundtrack of the film Hum Dono (1961).

In July 2024, in observance of Muharram and Ashura, Ali released a set of six Noha recitations to commemorate the martyrdom and sacrifices of Husayn ibn Ali and his companions in the Battle of Karbala, continuing a long-standing tradition of the Patiala Gharana.

== Artistry, musical style, and impact ==
=== Voice ===
Ali is widely acknowledged across the subcontinent as an accomplished and impeccable vocalist with a strong and deep voice. His vocals have been variously described as "soulful," "soothing," "haunting," "melodious," "emotive," and "effortless." He is often lauded for his "vocal histrionics," evocative vocal expressions, versatility, "expansive vocal range," and vocal depth and timbre. Ali is also noted for his unrestrained and intense singing style, raw and husky vocal texture, and his ability to hit high notes. Consistent with his classical training in the Patiala Gharana tradition, he is particularly adept at improvisations and intricate manoeuvres that require vocal agility such as taans and murkis.

Ali acknowledges his tenor-like ability to sing comfortably at a high-pitch and credits his brother, Asad Amanat Ali Khan, for helping him modulate his voice in the upper registers, stating: "...we have this ability to sing at a very high pitch. Normally when you reach...for the high notes, your voice gets shrill. From him [Asad] I learnt the ability to control that and maintain [a] certain roundness to the voice." Ali has said that he does not do anything specific to maintain his vocal health, but has mentioned in various interviews that diligent training and ongoing practice (riyaz) are important to him, saying, "I think training is important because it proves that you are honest with your work.

=== Musical philosophy and creative process ===
Ali is known for his fusion-based, experimental approach to music and has been described as an "experimental classicist." He enjoys working with intersecting musical styles and blending elements of different genres together, contending that "music has no fixed rules" and that "one should not stick to one genre as a musician." Ali does not believe in limiting himself as a vocalist, claiming that "there are no set rules that music adheres to" and that artistes "shouldn't be too rigid about any form of music." In an interview, he asserted that this is typical of Patiala Gharana vocalists who are known for experimenting with new musical styles: "the gharana I belong to [has] always loved to experiment with music. Whatever the genre, I always try out whatever comes my way."

Describing his approach to composing music, Ali stated in an interview, "blending eastern classical with western pop rock is what I love to do the most." Infusing elements of classical ragas into his pop, soft rock, and Sufi compositions is therefore a distinctive feature of Shafqat Amanat Ali's music, especially salient in his albums, including Saagar in which as many as seven songs incorporate various elements from Hindustani classical ragas. In all three of his solo albums, Ali similarly attempted to innovate and add a contemporary touch to traditional eastern classical music to reposition it in the global music scene. While not deliberately trying to break convention, he has experimented stylistically with ragas to make them more approachable and palatable for present-day audiences, asserting that "it's good to keep experimenting so that listeners do not get bored." He has also intentionally named some of his songs after the ragas they are based on.

Given his family heritage and classical training, Ali believes that traditional classical music has an enduring appeal, but that artistes need to present it in a simpler and more relatable way to popularise it with audiences today, claiming that "classical gayaki (singing) works with the modern audiences only when it is complemented with contemporary panache." In a 2020 interview, while referring to "Khamaj (Mora Saiyaan)", now a cult classic song, Ali stated: "With Mora Saiyaan, set in raga Khamaj, I introduced the contemporary audience to a thumri...that my elders had been singing for generations. This is the beauty and timelessness of our classical music." Similarly, in other interviews, he has noted that "it was important to carry the rich heritage of our forefathers, but we also must improvise to connect with the younger generation of listeners," because "it is important to keep good music alive — it's the soul of a civilisation."

=== Sufi style and influence ===
Ali has stated that he believes in Sufism. He also describes himself as being "inclined towards spirituality," asserting in an interview that "anybody can be spiritual and they could belong to any religion. When people turn fanatics and extremists in the name of religion, it's not spirituality. Spirituality, according to me, is tolerance and respect for every religion." Elaborating further, he states: "one can draw from every religion and marry it with what one has learnt from one's own religion to find a way to God. Being human, according to me, is spirituality. Someone who fights to bring peace and betterment to humanity is spiritual."

Much of Ali's music showcases these distinct Sufi influences by way of prominent Sufi themes and syncretic imagery. Several of his songs (particularly in his albums Tabeer and Muh Dikhai) revolve around familiar Sufi themes of transformative spiritual love, mysticism, oneness of humanity, spiritual awakening, and the anguish of being separated from God (as the Beloved). Ali also frequently uses or references the works of Sufi poets and philosophers such as Amir Khusrau, Bulleh Shah, and Khwaja Ghulam Farid in his own compositions. His singing style has been described as an "effortless collage of classical, Sufi, and new-age notes."

=== Impact ===
With his early work with Fuzön for their album Saagar (2002), Ali is credited with "playing a significant role in defining Pakistani youth and pop culture" at the turn of the century, along with other Pakistani bands like Strings, Junoon, and Vital Signs. By combining his traditional classical core with edgy and modern aesthetics, Ali is said to have charted his own musical course, broken musical boundaries, and extended the classical legacy of the Patiala Gharana by bringing it to a wider audience.

Specific songs from Saagar sung by Ali have also been singled out for their long-term musical and cultural impact on the South Asian soundscape. In 2012, The Express Tribune (Pakistan) wrote, "Songs like "Khamaj" and "Teray Bina"...are rendered timeless and will be written in golden words in the history of Pakistani pop." In 2015, referring to "Aankhon Ke Saagar", Rafay Mahmood of The Express Tribune wrote: "For the first time, people witnessed a trained singer from a classical gharana (in this case Patiala) making perfect use of his vocal range to add depth to rock and roll riffs in arrangements. "Aankhon Kay Saagar ... took the industry by storm as it was something truly unimaginable, especially at that time." Referring to another song from the album called "Akhian," Mahmood wrote, "Akhian changed the landscape of the music industry in the early 2000s."

Pakistani ghazal singer Muhammad Ali also credits Ali with the renewed interest in classical music in Pakistan, stating: "There was a time when it seemed that the likes of Mehdi Hassan, Ghulam Ali and Pervez Mehdi have completely disappeared, and forever. However, it was with the entry of Shafqat Amanat Ali that classical singing was revived and people redeveloped an interest in the genre."

At his 2021 concert in Abu Dhabi, Indian playback singer Arijit Singh expressed his admiration for Ali, listing him as one of his favourite singers.

== Other work ==
Ali has lent his vocals to dozens of Pakistani drama (soap opera) soundtracks (known as OSTs) over the years, including the popular song "Ik Sitam Aur Meri Jaan" from Saiqa (2009), which he sang as a tribute to the legendary ghazal singer Mehdi Hassan. Continuing a tradition established by his father, Ustad Amanat Ali Khan, Ali has also sung numerous patriotic songs throughout his career which have been released regularly on the occasion of Pakistan's Independence Day, Resolution Day, and Defence Day.

Ali made an appearance on the "Rubaroo" episode of Indian Idol Season 4 in 2008. From October 2015 to January 2016, he served as a judge on Zee TV's Asia's Singing Superstar along with Shankar Mahadevan. He has also performed frequently on Virsa Heritage Revived — an entertainment and live music show that aired on PTV, hosted by Yousaf Salahuddin.

In 2020, Ali was invited to serve on the Cultural, Heritage and Sports Advisory Board for the Parliamentary Special Committee on Kashmir by committee chairperson Shehryar Afridi. The advisory board was conceived as a creative alliance of media, music, and sports personalities with the goal of promoting Pakistan's cultural heritage and legacy within the country and abroad.

Ali has sung in numerous languages including Hindi, Urdu, Punjabi, Arabic, Bengali, and Gujarati, and performs regularly in shows and concerts around the world. He has fondly been nicknamed the "Rockstar Ustad" by Salim Merchant of the Indian musician duo Salim–Sulaiman.

== Discography ==
=== Albums and EPs ===
- Saagar (2002)
- Tabeer (2008)
- Kyun Dooriyan (2010)
- Muh Dikhai (2015)
- A Tribute to Legends: Ghulam Ali (2022)
  No.	Title	Lyrics	Length
  1.	"Bhul Jaan Sub Gham"	Khawaja Pervaiz; Nazir Ali	4:01
  2.	"Jo Na Mil Sakay" (re-release)	Khawaja Pervaiz; Nazir Ali	5:02
  3.	"Mainay Har Kanta"	Khawaja Pervaiz; Nazir Ali	4:48
  4.	"Naina Tosay Lagay"	Ghulam Ali; Naqsh Lyallpuri; Nazir Ali	4:05
  5.	"Tere Piyaar Main"	Mohsin Raza; Nazir Ali; Obaidullah Aleem	4:40
  6.	"Way Tu Paa Kay Judaiyan"	Ghulam Ali; Nazir Ali; Traditional folk	3:47
  7.	"Wo Mujsey"	Hussain Latif; Nazir Ali; Ghulam Mustafa Tabassum	4:32
- Tere Liye (EP, 2023)

=== Compilation albums ===
- The Very Best of Shafqat Amanat Ali (2012)
- Best of Me: Shafqat Amanat Ali (2013)
- Moods of Shafqat Amanat Ali (2014)
- Shafqat Amanat Ali: My Favourites (2015)

=== Singles ===
- "Aa Do Kadiyan" (2004)
- "Tere Bagair Sajna" (2004)
- "Josh" (2007)
- "Yaad Toh Aayengay Hum Tum Ko" (2007)
- "Mujrai Khalq Mein" (Noha recitation, 2008)
- "Paiman" (PAIMAN Project, 2008)
- "Jazba" (2009)
- "Ragon Mein Jitna Khoon Hai" (2009)
- "Lang Aaja" (2010)
- "Dil Hi To Hai" (from the compilation album Dil Se, 2010)
- "Pakida" (from the compilation album ARRK, 2010)
- "Yahaan" (2011)
- "Khird Kay Pass" (from the compilation album Adab E Khud Aa Gahi – Allama Iqbal Special, 2012)
- "Khudi Ka Sirr-e-Nihan" (from the compilation album Adab E Khud Aa Gahi – Allama Iqbal Special, 2012)
- "Ye Payam Day Gai Hai" (from the compilation album Adab E Khud Aa Gahi – Allama Iqbal Special, 2012)
- "Dua" (from the compilation album Global Sounds of Peace, 2013)
- "Dekho Kal Hamara Hai" (2014)
- "Muhafiz Aman Ke Hum Hain" (2015)
- "Ab Kaha Jao Gay" (from the compilation album Dil Ka Mehram, 2015)
- "Mitti Diye Maayen" (2015)
- "Ye Matti Apnay Wattan Ki Hai" (2015)
- "Laagi Re Tose Lagi" (from the compilation album Maestro's Studio Sessions, 2016)
- "Chhanan" (from the compilation album Existential Sufi, 2017)
- "Kal Hii Ki Baat" (from the compilation album Existential Sufi, 2017)
- "Samajh Na Aave" (2017)
- "Ae Watan Tera Bhala Ho" (2017)
- "Tu Salamat Watan" (2017)
- "Jashn-e-Azadi" (2017)
- Official anthem for Lahore Qalandars (2017 Pakistan Super League)
- "Jindadi" (2018)
- "Nain Mila" (2018)
- "Hain Ye Pasban" (2018) (Note: Also featured in the 2020 compilation album Dhanak Kay Rang by ISPR media productions)
- "Hamara Pakistan" (2018)
- "Sab Pakistani Miltay Hain" (2018)
- "Salam Ho Mere Watan Tujhe Salam" (2018)
- "Wardi" (2018)
- "Pehray Dekho Ya Ali" (Noha recitation, 2019)
- "Haye Haye Ay Lutiyan Vich Karbal De" (Noha recitation, 2019)
- "Fareyaad Mohammad Salay Aala" (Noha recitation, 2019)
- "Baal Ke Deeva Dua Kar Di" (Noha recitation, 2019)
- "Kya Hai Ali Ye Nutqay" (Manqabat, 2019)
- "Ja Chor Day Meri Waadi" (2020)
- "Zindagi Hai Pakistan" (2020)
- "Lassi" (2020)
- "Hey Daata" (2020)
- "Ghar Angan" (2020)
- "Dil Dharkey Levies Levies" (2020)
- "Jo Na Mil Sake" (2020)
- "Main Kya Janu" (2020)
- "Maujzaa" (2021)
- Celebrity Premier League (CPL) Anthem (2021)
- "Yaad" (2022)
- "Dil Hai Tera Ghar Ya Ali" (Manqabat, 2022)
- "Mahi Mahi" (2022)
- "Yeh Honsla" (Lo-fi, 2023)
- "Qabool Hai" (2023)
- "Raatan Nu" (2024)
- "Allah Tero Naam" (2024)
- "Chalay Hain Jaanib-e- Kufa" (Noha recitation, 2024)
- "Gham-E- Shabbir Mai" (Noha recitation, 2024)
- "Qaidi Ban Ke" (Noha recitation, 2024)
- "Aabad Reyn Veray" (Noha recitation, 2024)
- "Ye Sochta Hun" (Noha recitation, 2024)
- "Mujrai Khalq Mein" (Noha recitation, 2024)
- "Ho Salaam Us Par" (2024)
- "Raaz Keh Gaye" (2024)
- "Guru Nanak Aaya" (2024)
- "Meharma" (2024)

=== Collaborations ===
- "Mahi" (with Overload), 2006
- "Tu Hi Tu Hai" (from the compilation studio album Zindagi by Zubeen Garg), 2007
- "Ram Rai" (from the compilation studio album Guru Manyo Granth by Jagjit Singh), 2008
- "Yeh Hum Naheen" (with Strings, Ali Zafar, Shuja Haider et al.), 2008
- "Imtehan Hai Imtehan" (with Rahat Fateh Ali Khan), 2010
- "Aye Mere Watan Tez Qadam Ho" (with Fariha Pervez), 2010
- "Let Go" (with Fink and Salim–Sulaiman, for The Dewarists), 2012
- "Deedar" (with Northern Lights), 2017
- "Shafqat with Shafqat" (with Shafqat Ali Khan), 2020
- "Mader-e-Meherban" (with Abida Parveen and Sajjad Ali), 2021
- "Raat Jaga Pakhi" (with Shithi Saha), 2021
- "Ya Nabi Salam" (Durood recitation with Rahat Fateh Ali Khan), 2022
- "Kyun Kay Main Green Hoon" (with Abida Parveen, Rahat Fateh Ali Khan, Atif Aslam et al.), 2022
- "Rabb" (with Rekha Bhardwaj, Tochi Raina, and Nirmala Maghani), 2023
- "Laghzish-e-Mastana" (with Abida Parveen), 2023

=== Coke Studio Pakistan ===
==== Season 2 (2009) ====
- "Khamaaj"
- "Aankhon Kay Saagar"
- "Mahi Ve" (with the band Josh)
- "Ajab Khail"

==== Season 10 (2017) ====
- "Qaumi Taranah" (National Anthem of Pakistan)
- "Allahu Akbar" (with Ahmed Jahanzeb)
- "Bol"
- "Maula Tera Noor"

=== Coke Studio India, 2011 (Season 1, Episode 6) ===
- "Akhiyan"
- "Aay Hari He"
- "Kya Haal Sunawan"
- "Tere Bin Dil Laage Na"

=== MTV Unplugged, 2012 (Season 2, Episode 2) ===
- "Mora Saiyaan"
- "Aankhon Ke Saagar"
- "Yeh Honsla"
- "Kyun Main Jagoon"
- "Aavo Saiyon"
- "Manmaniyan"

=== Songs for Pakistani Drama Soundtracks (OSTs) ===
- "Jaye Kahan Yeh Dil" from Jaye Kahan Yeh Dil (2005)
- Theme song from Matti (2005)
- Theme song from Makan (2006)
- "Teri Yaad Aayi" from Khamoshiyan (2008)
- "Ik Sitam Aur Meri Jaan" from Saiqa (2009)
- "Kaisi Hain Dooriyan" from Kaisi Hain Dooriyan (2009)
- "Ishq Gumshuda" from Ishq Gumshuda (2010)
- "Haath Se Haath" from Aman (2010)
- "Jiya Na Jaye" from Jiya Na Jaye (2013)
- "Alvida" from Alvida (2015)
- "Makhmal" from Makhmal (2015)
- "Alif Allah Aur Insaan" from Alif Allah Aur Insaan (2017)
- "Lakin" from Lakin (2017)
- "Kahaan Mil Sake" from Dhund (2017)
- "Dil-e-Majboor" from Dil-e-Majboor (2017)
- "Ishq Ramazan" from Ishq Ramazan (2017)
- "Gustakh Ishq" from Gustakh Ishq (2017)
- "Koi Ishq Na Janay" from Koi Ishq Na Janay (2017)
- "Kaahay Lagi Lagan" from Aik Mohabbat Kafi Hai (2018)
- "Tere Jaane Ke Baad" from Tere Jaane Ke Baad (2018)
- "Bewafa" from Bewafa (2019)
- "Thora Sa Haq" from Thora Sa Haq (2019)
- "Tum Akhiyon Ka Noor" from Main Agar Chup Hoon (2020)
- "Benaam Si Mohabbat" from Benaam (2021)
- "Tere Ishq Mein" from Jafaa (2024)

=== Songs for film soundtracks ===
Year	Song	Film	Co-singer	Music director
2022	"Dil Harray"	Chakkar	Momina Mustehsan	Naveed Nashad
2019	"Jaan e Mann"	Kaaf Kangana	Beena Khan	Naveed Nashad
2018	"Do Naina"	Bhaiaji Superhit	Aakanksha Sharma	Amjad Nadeem
2018	"Piya Samaye"	Mulk	Arshad Hussain	Anurag Saikia
2018	"Bahon Mein Teri"	Na Band Na Baraati	Solo	Ayaz Sonu
2018	"Milon Ke Faasle"	Ishqeria	Altamash Faridi	Rashid Khan
2017	"Yaad Na Aawein"	Yalghaar	Solo	Syed Ali Hafeez
2017	"Tere Naal Naal"	Punjab Nahi Jaungi	Solo	Shani Arshad
2017	"Jogi (reprise)"	Shaadi Mein Zaroor Aana	Solo	Arko Pravo Mukherjee
2017	"Tu Ban Ja Gali Benaras Ki (reprise)"	Shaadi Mein Zaroor Aana	Solo	Rashid Khan
2017	"Pyar"	Bailaras	Solo	Jatinder Shah
2017	"Sahiba"	Firangi	Solo	Jatinder Shah
2017	"Ghawre Pherar Gaan"	Michael	Timir Biswas	Indrajit Dey
2017	"Dila Thora Thair"	Yaar Annmulle 2	Solo	Daljit Singh
2016	"Piya Dekhan Ko"	Mah e Mir	Solo	Various
2016	"Kuch Nahi"	Tubelight	Solo	Pritam
2016	"Sama Paye Gayian"	Main Teri Tu Mera	Solo	Gurcharan Singh
2016	"Yaari"	Bachaana	Solo	Prasad Sashte; Ali Sher
2016	"Bachaana Mashup"	Bachaana	Benny Dayal, Usman Qureshi, Komal Ghaznfar	Prasad Sashte; Ali Sher
2016	"Kaddi Aa Mil Yaar"	Bathinda Express	Solo	Gurcharan Singh
2016	"Rabba"	Sarbjit	Solo	Tanishk Bagchi
2016	"Ab Tu Hi Tu"	Jab Tum Kaho	Palak Muchhal	Anuj Garg; Kuwar Virk
2015	"Main Nai Jaana Pardes"	Tevar	Solo	Sajid–Wajid
2015	"Naina Baawre"	Munde Kamaal De	Solo	Farzan Faaiz
2015	"Maula Mere Maula"	Arshinagar	Madhuraa Bhattacharya	Debojyoti Mishra
2014	"Bhugol"	Filmistaan	Shabab Shabri	Arijit Datta
2014	"Bol"	Filmistaan	Solo	Arijit Datta
2014	"Jeenay Chaley"	Dukhtar	Solo	Sahir Ali Bagga, Peter Nashel
2014	"Manchala"	Hasee Toh Phasee	Nupur Pant	Vishal–Shekhar
2014	"Allah Waariyan"	Yaariyan	Solo	Arko Pravo Mukherjee
2014	"Jo Dikhte Ho"	Kya Dilli Kya Lahore	Solo	Sandesh Shandilya
2013	"Jera Vi"	Main Hoon Shahid Afridi	Solo	Shani & Kami
2013	"Tera Mera Naam"	Akaash Vani	Solo	Hitesh Sonik
2013	"Ras Ke Bharey Tore Nain"	Satyagraha	Solo	Aadesh Shrivastava
2013	"Teri Jhuki Nazar"	Murder 3	Solo	Pritam
2012	"Zindagi Se"	Raaz 3D	Solo	Jeet Gannguli
2012	"Ya Maula"	Maximum	Solo	Amjad Nadeem
2012	"Tu Hi Mera"	Jannat 2	Solo	Pritam
2012	"Jannat 2 (Mashup)"	Jannat 2	KK, Nikhil D'Souza, Javed Ali & Anupam Amod	Pritam
2012	"Darmiyaan"	Jodi Breakers	Clinton Cerejo	Salim–Sulaiman
2012	"Phir Le Aya Dil" (Redux)	Barfi!	Solo	Pritam
2011	"Dildaara (Stand by Me)"	Ra.One	Vishal Dadlani, Shekhar Ravjiani, Clinton Cerejo	Vishal–Shekhar
2011	"Chhayee Hai Tanhayee"	Love Breakups Zindagi	Salim Merchant, Shruti Pathak	Salim–Sulaiman
2011	"Jaane Kyun" (Sufi Version)	Always Kabhi Kabhi	Solo	Pritam
2011	"Tere Bin Mera Jeevan"	Love Possible	Solo	Afsar Sajid
2011	"Kyun Main Jagoon"	Patiala House	Solo	Shankar–Ehsaan–Loy
2011	"Kyun Main Jagoon" (Remix)	Patiala House	Solo	Shankar–Ehsaan–Loy
2011	"Kyun Main Jagoon" (Unplugged)	Patiala House	Solo	Shankar–Ehsaan–Loy
2011	"Poore Se Zara Sa Kam Hai" (Unreleased)	Mausam	Solo	Pritam
2010	"Tere Naina"	My Name Is Khan	Solo	Shankar–Ehsaan–Loy
2010	"Bin Tere"	I Hate Luv Storys	Sunidhi Chauhan	Vishal–Shekhar
2010	"Shukriya Zindagi"	Aashayein	Solo	Salim–Sulaiman
2010	"Shukriya Zindagi" (Sad)	Aashayein	Solo	Salim–Sulaiman
2009	"Tum Mile - Rock"	Tum Mile	Solo	Pritam
2008	"Caravan"	Hello	Solo	Sajid–Wajid
2008	"Allah Megh De"	Ramchand Pakistani	Solo	Debojyoti Mishra
2008	"Phir Wohi Raastey"	Ramchand Pakistani	Shubha Mudgal	Debojyoti Mishra
2008	"Tishna Tishna Dil"	Zindagi Tere Naam	Sunidhi Chauhan	Sajid–Wajid
2008	"Allah Ke Nur"	Chaturanga	Solo	Debojyoti Mishra
2008	"Moula Tere Bina"	Chaturanga	Solo	Debojyoti Mishra
2006	"Yeh Honsla"	Dor	Salim Merchant	Salim–Sulaiman
2006	"Yeh Honsla" (Sad Version)	Dor	Solo	Salim–Sulaiman
2006	"Mitwa"	Kabhi Alvida Naa Kehna	Shankar Mahadevan, Caralisa Monteiro	Shankar–Ehsaan–Loy
2006	"Mitwa" (Revisited)	Kabhi Alvida Naa Kehna	Shankar Mahadevan, Caralisa Monteiro	Shankar–Ehsaan–Loy

== Awards and honours ==
Year	Nominee / work	Award	Result	Notes
Lifetime Achievement Award
2023	Lifetime Achievement Award	by Government College University, Lahore	Won	
Filmfare Awards
2012	Filmfare Award for Best Male Playback Singer	"Dildaara" – Ra.One	Nominated	
2012	Filmfare Award for Best Male Playback Singer	"Bin Tere" – I Hate Luv Storys	Nominated	
IIFA Awards
2012	IIFA Award for Best Male Playback Singer	"Bin Tere" – I Hate Luv Storys	Nominated	
GiMA Awards
2012	GiMA Award for Best Male Playback Singer	"Bin Tere" – I Hate Luv Storys	Nominated	
BIG Star Entertainment Awards
2012	Best Playback Singer – Male	"Tere Naina" – My Name Is Khan	Nominated	
Zee Cine Awards
2012	Zee Cine Award for Best Playback Singer – Male	"Dildaara" – Ra.One	Nominated	
2013	Zee Cine Award for Best Playback Singer – Male	"Tu Hi Mera" – Jannat 2	Nominated	
Pakistan Media Award
2011	Best Playback Singer – Male		Nominated	
The Musik Awards
2008	Most Wanted Male		Won	
Pride of Performance Award
2008	Pride of Performance Award	by the President of Pakistan	Won	

== See also ==
- Patiala Gharana
- Ali Baksh Jarnail
- Akhtar Hussain
- Amanat Ali Khan
- Bade Fateh Ali Khan
- Asad Amanat Ali Khan
