= Tabeer (album) =

Studio album by Shafqat Amanat Ali
- Released: September 2008
- Recorded: Karachi, Pakistan
- Studio: Couple of Good Studios
- Genre: Pop, Sufi, Devotional, Folk
- Length: 42:45
- Label: Music Today, Fire Records
- Producer: Shani (Zeeshan) Haider

Shafqat Amanat Ali chronology
Saagar (2002)	Tabeer (2008)	Kyun Dooriyan (2010)

Tabeer (Urdu: تعبیر, Hindi: ताबीर; transl. Interpretation or manifestation of dreams) is the debut solo studio album by Pakistani classical and pop singer, songwriter, and composer Shafqat Amanat Ali, released in India on September 9, 2008 by the Music Today label.

== Background ==
After leaving the band Fuzön in 2006, Ali chose to focus on his solo career as a vocalist. Based on traditional folk and Sufi works, his first solo album Tabeer was commissioned and released in India in September 2008 by the Music Today label. The album was also released in Pakistan by the Fire Records label as their mega Eid release. Rohail Hyatt, the co-creator of Coke Studio, was initially roped in to produce Tabeer but was not ultimately able to work on it.

Tabeer amassed significant critical acclaim in both India and Pakistan and received praise for mixing "the earthy with the refined." Ali garnered praise for his "powerful vocals," his "command over the classical idiom and modern music, and for blending catchy pop melodies with folk vocals.

== Music and style ==
Rolling Stone (India) described Ali’s vocal stylings in Tabeer as "cull[ing] from Pakistan’s inherent Sufiana (mystical) traces and his traditional Patiala Gharana heritage," while Billboard magazine characterized the album as a modern reworking of "traditional Sufi poetry." Ali described the album as having "soulful music with some Sufi elements." He stated that Tabeer was "a very personal piece of work" for him and that the album was about establishing his own distinct identity as a vocalist: "these were the songs that I always thought I'd do someday, and when I was approached by the Indian record label Music Today, I thought I'd sing those songs." He further shared that his goal with Tabeer was to experiment "with the contemporary way of music, a mix of earthy and traditional tones, to give music lovers something fresh."

== Recording and production ==
Tabeer was recorded, mixed, and mastered by Shani (Zeeshan) Haider at Couple of Good Studios in Karachi, Pakistan. Rolling Stone (India) characterized Tabeer as having "compellingly softer tones," which was a marked departure from Ali's previous work with Fuzön in Saagar. Ali remarked that he enjoyed having a greater degree of creative control and artistic freedom while working on Tabeer as a solo artiste, compared to working on Saagar with Fuzön, stating: "with Fuzön, we had to use a fixed set of instruments even when they were not needed for a song. On this album, I had the freedom to incorporate only those instruments that are needed." Tabeer features guitar work by Imran Muhammad Akhoond and flute work by Sajid Ali.

Although Tabeer was designed to cater to Indian musical sensibilities and was also released first in India, Ali asserted in an interview that he was determined to record and produce the album in Pakistan "because Pakistani musicians and recordings [have] their own distinct sound," which he wanted to highlight in the album, while also trying to avoid the Bollywood music mold. Ali has mentioned that he ended up excluding some of the songs he originally wrote and composed for Tabeer because they were thematically "very dark" and he did not deem them commercially viable at the time.

== Composition and songwriting ==
Ali worked on developing tracks for Tabeer for a period of about ten months and mentioned: "I like to compose using ragas because that is my base and my foundation." Referring to his songwriting process for the album, he noted: "the music I make doesn't have rock tones anymore. I like sounds that relate to humanity, like Sufi music." Accordingly, several songs in the album have noticeably spiritual and devotional overtones.

"Khaireyan De Naal" was the lead single and opening track on Tabeer and was used heavily to promote the album across music channels in both India and Pakistan. Ali borrowed the primary chorus line of the song from Tufail Niazi's folk song of the same name and wrote and composed the song around it. The song tells the story of the tragic romance of Heer Ranjha, a Punjabi folktale written in 1766 by the poet Waris Shah. Ali received significant critical acclaim for "Khaireyan De Naal" and has mentioned that it is his favorite track in the album. He also composed and sang a version of this song for the soundtrack of the 2015 Hindi movie, Tevar.

The album has strong Sufi overtones and features five Sufi tracks – "Rang Le," "Bulleh Shah," "Dum Ali Ali Dum," "Rohi," and "Pagalpan":

- "Rang Le" is based on the well-known Sufi devotional song, Mohe Apne Hi Rang Mein Rang De, written by Sufi poet Amir Khusrau as a supplication to his spiritual guide — the Sufi saint Nizamuddin Auliya — beseeching him to dye Khusrau in the colors of divine love. The theme of immersive colors, dyes, and hues is a prominent motif in Sufi poetry and imagery and symbolizes union and oneness between the seeker and God (as the Beloved). Ali incorporated guitar- and accordion-led jazz improvisations into his arrangement of this track to lend it softer, romantic tones.
- The song "Bulleh Shah" is based on the Sufi devotional Kafi Aao Saiyo Ral Deo Ni Wadhai written by the 18th-century poet and philosopher, Bulleh Shah, in which he celebrates the ecstasy of finding his murshid (spiritual teacher) – the Sufi saint Shah Inayat Qadiri. Ali chose to name the song eponymously in honor of its writer. He also performed a version of this song for Season 2 of MTV Unplugged in 2012.
- Ali composed and wrote additional lyrics for the track "Dum Ali Ali Dum" which is a variation of the popular 600-year-old qawwali, "Dama Dam Mast Qalandar," originally written by Amir Khusrau and modified further by Bulleh Shah. The song is a much-celebrated and widely-sung tribute to the Sufi mystic and saint Hazrat Lal Shahbaz Qalandar and is part of the Indian subcontinent's cultural zeitgeist.
- "Rohi" is an adaptation of a Kafi titled "Jindri Luti Te Yaar Sajan" (also known as "Dilri Luti Te Yaar Sajan") written by the 19th-Century Sufi poet Khwaja Ghulam Farid. The Kafi was originally sung by Zahida Parveen, and various renditions of it have also been performed by Ustad Bade Ghulam Ali Khan, Pathanay Khan, Mehdi Hassan, and Abida Parveen among others. The original verses are written in the little-known Saraiki dialect from a remote region of Pakistan, which led Ali to alter some of the lyrics to make the song easier to understand. He also modified the composition of the original song to render it in a more contemporary style while retaining the traditional folk sounds of the original.
- "Pagalpan" is inspired by Sindhi folk music and plays with the familiar Sufi theme of seeking a path to God and enlightenment while also acknowledging that God is within oneself.

The song "Kartar," set in raga Darbari, is based on a time-honored Patiala Gharana bandish, originally sung by Ali's father Ustad Amanat Ali Khan and uncle Ustad Bade Fateh Ali Khan. Ali described the track as an "old traditional family song" and has shared that he extended the sthayi of the original bandish to develop it into a song. In 2009, Ali delivered a live performance of "Ajab Khail" — a modified rendition of "Kartar" — for Season 2 of Coke Studio Pakistan, produced by Rohail Hyatt. "Kartar" is particularly noted for its rock riffs and high-octane orchestration, and it was featured again as a bonus track in Ali's second solo album, Kyun Dooriyan (2010), with a slightly different arrangement.

== Track listing ==
Most tracks are written, composed, and arranged by Shafqat Amanat Ali. "Naina" is composed by Shani (Zeeshan) Haider. "Rohi" is written by Khwaja Ghulam Farid. The track "Tu Hi Tu Hai" was initially released as part of Zubeen Garg's debut (compilation) album, Zindagi, in 2007 but was later re-released as part of Tabeer with a modified arrangement.

No.	Title	Length
1.	"Khaireyan De Naal"	4:36
2.	"Naina"	4:13
3.	"Dum Ali Ali Dum"	5:52
4.	"Rang Le"	4:07
5.	"Bulleh Shah"	3:55
6.	"Pagalpan"	4:43
7.	"Rohi"	3:55
8.	"Kartar (Darbari)"	3:36
9.	"Tu Hi Tu Hai"	4:55
10.	"Manqabat (Ya Ali)"	2:53
Total length:		42:45

== See also ==
- Saagar
- Kyun Dooriyan
- Muh Dikhai
- Sufi music
