= Kyun Dooriyan =

Studio album by Shafqat Amanat Ali
- Released: March 2010
- Genre: Pop, pop rock, devotional, folk
- Length: 53:46
- Label: Music Today

Shafqat Amanat Ali chronology
Tabeer (2008)	Kyun Dooriyan (2010)	Muh Dikhai (2015)

Kyun Dooriyan (Hindi: क्यूँ दूरियाँ; transl. Why the Distances) is the second solo studio album by Pakistani classical and pop singer, songwriter, and composer Shafqat Amanat Ali, released in India on March 2, 2010 by the Music Today label.

== Background ==
Kyun Dooriyan was released two years after Ali's debut solo album Tabeer (2008) and features several high-energy tracks with a pronounced rock feel as well as a few romantic ballads. Ali stated that he wanted to release his second solo album in quick succession to make up for the long gap between the release of Saagar (2002) and Tabeer (2008). Kyun Dooriyan received positive reviews for its overall narrative structure and tight production, and Ali received praise for adapting "old traditional compositions and [giving] them new energy with his own interpretation and style."

== Music and style ==
Rolling Stone (India) described Kyun Dooriyan as a "heady spin of raga-rock" and Billboard magazine characterized the tone of album as a blend of "soul and rock." Ali referred to the album as "a mix of what I want – as well as what popular tastes demand from me." Consistent with his musical style, Ali rendered many of the songs in Kyun Dooriyan to blend elements of Hindustani classical music and Pakistani folk music, while also affording them more familiar contours of pop rock. Several tracks in the album feature arrangements where traditional instruments like the sarangi, sarod, dhol, and flute are interspersed with heavy guitar riffs, drums, and keyboards. The album includes songs in both Hindi and Punjabi languages.

== Composition and songwriting ==
Ali described the overall mood of the album as "more upbeat" and "energy-rich" compared to his previous album, Tabeer, which was mellower and more Sufi-spiritual and devotional in tone. Ali wrote and composed the songs "Paharhi" and "Naal Naal" while he was still the lead vocalist of Fuzön but modified the tracks to render them in a more contemporary style. The sentimental ballads in the album — "Kya Haal Sunawan," "Jaayein Kahan," "Mahiya," and "Paharhi" — revolve around melancholy themes of separation, pining for the beloved, yearning for reunion, and unrequited love. Ali has stated that the track "Saada Dil" was inspired by "We Will Rock You" by Queen, asserting: "I have always loved the beat to that song. Once while it was playing in the car, I started humming some of my own words to it which eventually became 'Saada Dil', but later major changes had to be made to the arrangement because of the melody, so it didn't really end up fitting the mold it initially took birth in."

Ali wrote the song "Wo Jaanta Hai" in the aftermath of the 2008 Mumbai attacks. Referring to the song, he stated that it was "an attempt to appeal to those who commit these heinous acts and tell them that God watches every injustice against His people and that before being anything else, every individual needs to be human first. As a musician I feel it is my responsibility to use whatever platform God has given me to spread this message. Islam teaches that if you have killed one human you have killed all of humanity and if you save one human, you have saved all of humanity. This begins at home, in our personal lives, with anybody we interact with. If every individual decided to be human first before anything else, we would definitely have a happier and more beautiful world to live in."

The title (and opening) track "Kyun Dooriyan," although originally conceptualized and written as a pop ballad, was eventually reimagined as a message of friendship and peace between India and Pakistan, with Ali noting, "it's a song for every relationship and I just feel that it is really a message for the Indo-Pak relationship right now." The song received a nomination in the 'Indie Pop Song of the Year' category at the 3rd Mirchi Music Awards in 2011, as did the track "Mahiya."

"Kya Haal Sunawan" is a Kafi based on the poetry of Khwaja Ghulam Farid, originally sung by Zahida Parveen. Ali borrowed the primary chorus line from the original but wrote new lyrics for the song, noting: "I am fascinated by that song and in some way wished to pay tribute to her forgotten legend." Similarly, in another interview he stated that this song was part of his "continued effort to pay tribute to yesteryear singers who were legends but have been forgotten simply because they existed in an era which lacked mass communication."

Ali recalled in an interview that "Tu Hi Sanam" was the first song he ever wrote and collaborated with noted guitarist Aamir Zaki to develop it. The track "Naukar Tere" was inspired by a traditional Saraiki wedding song from the pre-partition era that Ali heard his grandmother and aunts sing. "Paharhi" is a traditional thumri in raga Pahadi, reimagined in a rock arrangement, while "Jaayein Kahan" is partly based on raga Malkauns.

"Kartar (Darbari)" was originally released as part of Ali's debut solo album, Tabeer (2008), but was re-released as a bonus track in Kyun Dooriyan with minor modifications in its arrangement. For this track, Ali extended the sthayi of a traditional Patiala Gharana bandish — originally sung by his father Ustad Amanat Ali Khan and uncle Ustad Bade Fateh Ali Khan — to develop it into a complete song. Ali sang yet another variation of this track called "Ajab Khail" for Season 2 of Coke Studio Pakistan in 2009, produced by Rohail Hyatt.

== Track listing ==
All tracks written, composed and arranged by Shafqat Amanat Ali, except "Mahiya."

No.	Title	Length
1.	"Kyun Dooriyan"	4:55
2.	"Kya Haal Sunawan"	6:23
3.	"Jaayein Kahan"	6:04
4.	"Mahiya"	5:54
5.	"Naukar Tere"	4:10
6.	"Naal Naal"	3:56
7.	"Saada Dil"	3:41
8.	"Paharhi"	4:48
9.	"Tu Hi Sanam"	4:25
10.	"Wo Jaanta Hai"	5:58
11.	"Kartar (Darbari) (Bonus Track)"	3:32
Total length:		53:46

== See also ==
- Saagar
- Tabeer
- Muh Dikhai
