= Muh Dikhai =

Studio album by Shafqat Amanat Ali
- Released: March 20, 2015
- Genre: Pop, Sufi, devotional, folk
- Length: 51:02
- Label: Times Music

Shafqat Amanat Ali chronology
Kyun Dooriyan (2010)	Muh Dikhai (2015)	A Tribute to Legends: Ghulam Ali (2022)

Muh Dikhai: Unveiling the Songs of Eternal Love (Hindi: मुँह दिखाई; transl. Revealing One's Face) is the third solo studio album by Pakistani classical and pop singer, songwriter, and composer Shafqat Amanat Ali. It was released in India on March 20, 2015 by the Times Music label.

== Background and musical style ==
The album was released five years after Ali's previous album, Kyun Dooriyan, and does not specifically focus on a particular genre or theme. It features an eclectic mix of pop, folk, ghazal, sentimental ballads, and Sufi devotional songs and includes songs in both Hindi and Punjabi.

Rolling Stone (India) characterized the album as "genre-bending" and "rock-ballad-meets-symphony-meets-Hindustani classical." While discussing the overall tone of the album, Ali stated: "I have given a slight twist to the traditional forms in terms of orchestration and arrangements." Ali has stated that the songs "Rang," "Muh Dikhai (Teri Khoj)," "Dil Dharhaknay Ka Sabab," and "Ratiyaan" were especially significant for him, and that they formed the framework for the rest of the tracks in the album. Muh Dikhai received positive reviews for "fusing various genres to create timeless melodies" and several of its songs topped musical charts across both India and Pakistan.

== Composition and songwriting ==
Ali worked on the album for about three years and composed around 16 tracks for it, ultimately choosing nine of them for release. The track "Dil Dharhaknay Ka Sabab" is a popular ghazal originally composed by Ali's father, Ustad Amanat Ali Khan and written by prominent Pakistani poet Nasir Kazmi. The song has previously been sung by Ghulam Ali, Asha Bhonsle, and Pankaj Udhas using traditional ghazal arrangements. However, Ali rendered the song in an unconventional orchestral style for the album, using primarily a vocal-and-piano arrangement, in addition to utilizing the cello and oboe. In an interview with Rolling Stone (India), while referring to this track, Ali remarked: "when you think of ghazals, a certain idea comes to your mind; the conventional pattern usually, which involves tabla and harmonium. I wanted to change that. I wanted to do things differently.” Veteran Indian actor Naseeruddin Shah featured in the song's music video which was shot in Mumbai, India by renowned cinematographer Manu Anand, director of photography for Hindi movies such as Dum Laga Ke Haisha, Fan, and Zero. The music video also pays tribute to Pakistani singer Noor Jahan, who sang a version of the ghazal in 1984.

The sentimental ballads in the album—"Ratiyaan," "Tere Liye," and "Tum Nahi Aaye"—revolve around familiar romantic and emotional tropes of longing, loneliness, and memories. Consistent with love ballads, each of the three songs is narrative in nature and slower in tempo. They also follow a strophic form and feature musical arrangements that use acoustic instruments such as pianos, guitars, and orchestral sets.

The album features two Sufi tracks – "Muh Dikhai (Teri Khoj)" and "Rang."

- Referring to the name of the album and the eponymous title track, "Muh Dikhai" (literally: revealing one's face), Ali noted that the song "equates God to a bride whose face remains hidden under a veil. You have to let go of your corporeal existence to catch a glimpse of the divine." The notion of God's face being concealed behind a veil and yearning for the sight of God's face are prominent motifs in Sufi mysticism and Sufi mystical poetry. The song is based on the Punjabi poem titled "Rabb" from a collection of verses called Saave Pattar, written by noted Indian poet Mohan Singh.
- Ali adapted the track "Rang" from the well-known 700-year-old qawwali "Aaj Rang Hai," written by the 13th-century Sufi poet Amir Khusrau, where he (Khusrau) describes to his mother his ecstasy and joy upon finding his pir or murshid (spiritual guide) in the Sufi saint Nizamuddin Auliya. The original verses by Khusrau occupy a prominent space in the soundscape of Sufi music in South Asia. Numerous vocalists have sung variations of this popular song over the years — most notably Nusrat Fateh Ali Khan, Abida Parveen, and more recently, Rahat Fateh Ali Khan and Amjad Sabri for Coke Studio (Season 9). While the song is traditionally sung in a high-energy, fast-paced tempo consistent with the qawwali genre, Ali gave it a relatively softer and leisurely treatment, infusing mellow and earthy vocals into a contemporary arrangement, while still retaining rapturous elements of the qawwali.

== Track listing ==
Most tracks are written and composed by Shafqat Amanat Ali. The title track "Muh Dikhai (Teri Khoj)" is written by noted Indian poet Mohan Singh. "Rang" is written by Amir Khusrau. "Dil Dharhaknay Ka Sabab" is written by Nasir Kazmi, composed by Ali's father, Ustad Amanat Ali Khan, and arranged by Pakistani record producer Shani Arshad.

No.	Title	Length
1.	"Dil Kookay"	4:25
2.	"Janiya"	4:27
3.	"Ratiyaan"	5:51
4.	"Sun Lo"	5:32
5.	"Rang"	4:36
6.	"Tere Liye"	5:36
7.	"Muh Dikhai (Teri Khoj)"	6:12
8.	"Tum Nahi Aaye"	5:38
9.	"Dil Dharhaknay Ka Sabab"	8:45
Total length:		51:02

== See also ==
- Saagar
- Tabeer
- Kyun Dooriyan
