= Abbas Afridi =

Abbas Afridi may refer to:

- Abbas Afridi (cricketer) (born 2001), Pakistani cricketer
- Abbas Khan Afridi, Pakistani politician
