= Dilawar Shah =

Pakistani politician

Member of the National Assembly of Pakistan
- In office 2008–2013
- Constituency: NA-14 (Kohat)

Pir Dilawar Shah is a Pakistani politician who had been a member of the National Assembly of Pakistan from 2008 to 2013.

== Political career ==
He was elected to the National Assembly of Pakistan from Constituency NA-14 (Kohat) as a candidate of Awami National Party (ANP) in the 2008 Pakistani general election. He received 30,681 votes and defeated an independent candidate, Malak Mohammad Asad Khan.

In 2013, he quit ANP and joined Pakistan Peoples Party (PPP).

He ran for the seat of the National Assembly from Constituency NA-14 (Kohat) as a candidate of PPP in the 2013 Pakistani general election but was unsuccessful. He received 10,041 votes and lost the seat to Shehryar Khan Afridi.
