= Ibrar Sultan =

Pakistani politician

Mufti Ibrar Sultan MNA

Member of the National Assembly of Pakistan
- In office 2002–2007
- Constituency: NA-32 (Kohat)

Personal details
- Party: Muttahida Majlis-e-Amal (MMA)
- Occupation: Politician

Mufti Ibrar Sultan is a Pakistani politician who had been a member of the National Assembly of Pakistan from 2002 to 2007.

== See also ==
- List of Deobandis
