= Chaudhry Muhammad Sarwar Khan =

Pakistani politician

Chaudhry Muhammad Sarwar Khan چوہدری محمد سرور خان
- Chaudhary Sahab
- Ch. Muhammad Sarwar Khan (Left) meeting President Suharto (Right) of Indonesia

Member of the National Assembly of Pakistan
- In office 25 February 1985 – 12 October 1999
- Constituency: Sialkot / Narowal District

Member of the Provincial Assembly of Punjab & West Pakistan
- In office 9 March 1951 – 25 March 1969
- Constituency: Sialkot-VIII

Personal details
- Born: Mohammad Sarwar Khan; 1919
- Died: 2003 (aged 83–84) Sialkot, Pakistan

Chaudhry Muhammad Sarwar Khan (Urdu: چوہدری محمد سرور خان; 1919–2003) was the longest serving Parliamentarian in the history of Pakistan. He served in Provincial Assembly of the Punjab and National Assembly of Pakistan from 1951 to 1999 and was the longest serving member. The first direct elections held in Pakistan after independence were for the Provincial Assembly of the Punjab between 10–20 March 1951. He was elected as a Member of Legislative Assembly in 1951. He was again elected in the 1962 and 1964 Provincial Assembly elections in Pakistan. He remained Member National Assembly of Pakistan from 1985–1999. He was also member of Mājlis-e-Shūrā Pākistān, The Federal Council from 1982–1984.

== Family background ==
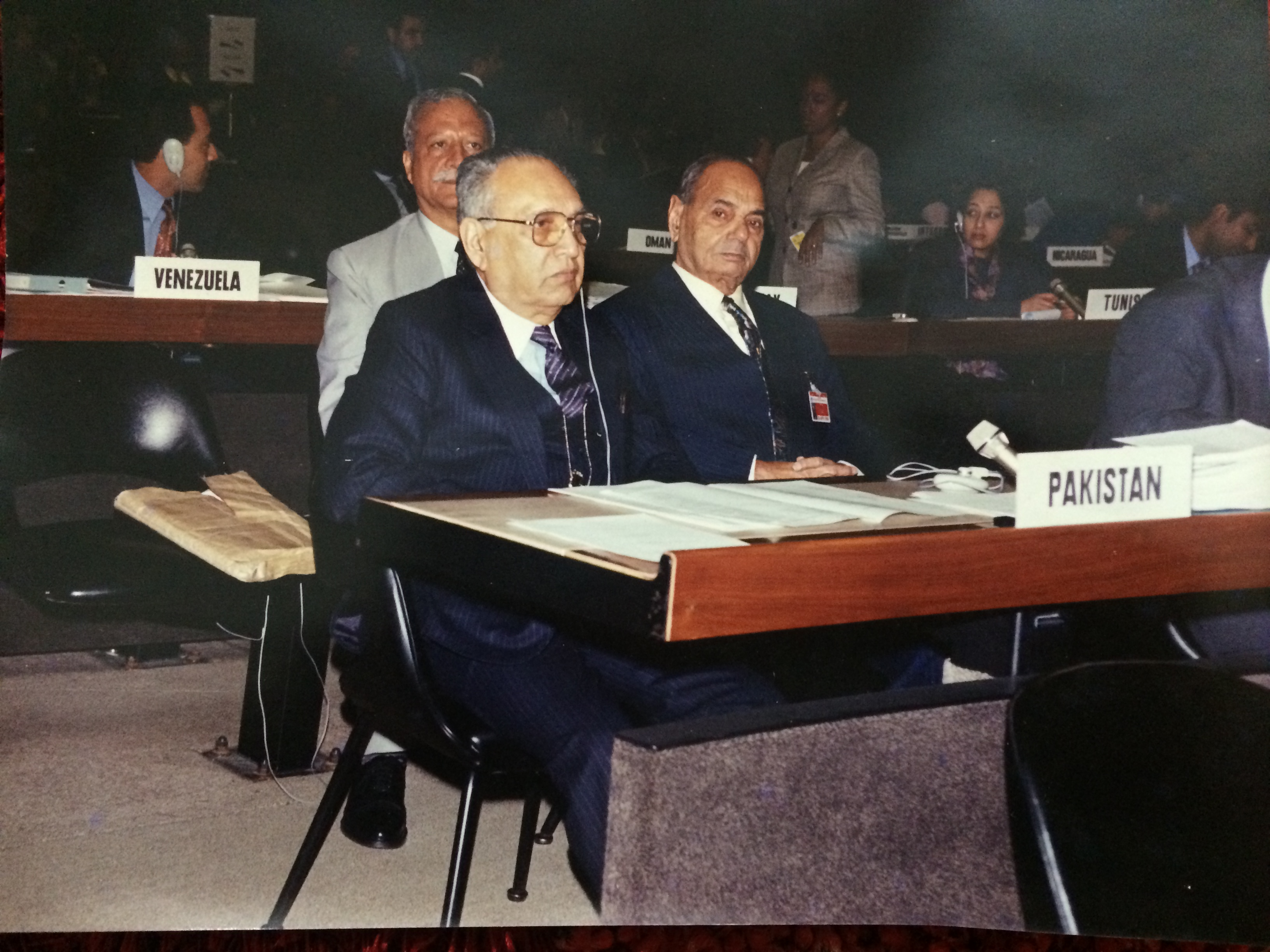
Chaudhry Sarwar (Right) representing Pakistan at United Nations Geneva, Switzerland.

Chaudhry Muhammad Sarwar Khan was born into a well known Sulehria Rajput family, who have Dogra Rajput ancestry in Rupochak, District Narowal cum Sialkot. He was a respected politician from Rupochak, Narowal. Chaudhry Sarwar's father Khan Bahadur Qasim and uncle Kazim Khan both served in the British Indian army. Khan Bahadur Qasim won the 1937 election from the state of Kashmir and Jammu and his younger brother Kazim khan held a top bureaucratic post in British Raj after retirement. Chaudhry Sarwar's Grandfather Hashim Khan also served in the British Indian Army during World War I in "58th Vaughan's Rifles (Frontier Force)" regiment and was awarded the Highest "Medal of Gallantry" during his service with Reginald Dyer in the Third Anglo-Afghan War. Chaudhry Sarwar's Great Grandfather father Sazawar Khan died fighting against the British during 1857 Indian Mutiny. Chaudhry Sarwar's Great Grandfather Abdul Nabi Khan was a Nawab in the Mughal court (No Hazari) and was under an obligation to provide 9000 troops to the Mughal Empire.

== Political career ==
=== Early politics ===
Chaudhry Sarwar's younger brother Chaudhry Ghulam Ahmed Khan was a seasoned right-wing politician of Pakistan Muslim League. He was elected Member Provincial Assembly of Punjab (MPA) for five consecutive terms dating 1985 to 1999.

Chaudhry Muhammad Sarwar's son, Mansoor Sarwar Khan was the first elected President of Central Punjab, Member Core-Committee and National Council Pakistan of Pakistan Tehreek-e-Insaf. Central Punjab is composed of Lahore and Gujranwala divisions having ten districts altogether. His son is also the author of the book titled Reclaiming Pakistan Imran Khan's Quest for Freedom: Leadership, Reforms. the Struggle for National Renewal https://www.amazon.com/Reclaiming-Pakistan-Imran-Khans-Freedom/dp/B0DWCVJ31P

=== Later politics and office ===
Chaudhry Sarwar was elected as Member of the National Assembly of Pakistan in 1985, 1988, 1990, 1993 and 1997 General Elections. Despite being a stalwart of Pakistan Muslim League, Mr Sarwar accompanied Prime Minister Zulfikar Ali Bhutto for Simla Agreement in India in 1972 to ease the tensions between the two countries following the Indo-Pak war of 1971. On 24 December 1981, a Federal Council (Majlis-e-Shoora) was constituted by then President General Muhammad Zia-ul-Haq, Its members were nominated by the President. Khan served in the Federal Council from 1982–1984. In 1997, he was appointed as chairman Parliamentary Special Committee on Kashmir by then Prime Minister of Pakistan Muhammad Nawaz Sharif. He led Kashmir Committee composed of 26 MNA's from May 1997 to October 1999.

Following the landslide victory of Pakistan Muslim League (PML-N) in the 1997 parliamentary elections, Khan was nominated as the presidential candidate by the party but ultimately Nawaz Sharif appointed Rafique Tarar as the president of Pakistan.

After the 1999 coup d'état staged by General Pervez Musharraf, Prime Minister Nawaz Sharif was exiled to Saudi Arabia. Following the exile, Khan was nominated as the party president, however due to old age and deteriorating health he refused the party presidency and it was passed on to Makhdoom Javed Hashmi. Khan was referred as "Baba-e-Muslim League" by Nawaz Sharif due to his lifelong services in politics of Pakistan.

== Role in Kargill War ==
During Kargil War, as the Chairman of National Assembly Kashmir Committee, Khan addressed the United Nations Commission on Human Rights (UNCHR) in Geneva and asked the world powers to give Kashmiris the right of self-determination according to UN resolutions.

== Death ==
He died in 2003, at the age of 83 years in Sialkot District, Pakistan.
