= Amjad Khan Afridi =

Pakistani politician

- امجد خان آفریدی

Member of the Provincial Assembly of Khyber Pakhtunkhwa
- In office 13 August 2018 – 18 January 2023
- Constituency: PK-80 (Kohat-I)
- In office 31 May 2013 – 28 May 2018
- Constituency: PK-37 (Kohat-I)
- In office 20 March 2008 – 20 March 2013
- Constituency: PF-37 (Kohat-I)

Personal details
- Party: JIP (2025–present)
- Other political affiliations: PPP (2021-2025); IND (2018–2021); PTI (2013–2018); ANP (2008–2013)
- Relations: Abbas Khan Afridi (brother)
- Parent: Shammim Afridi (father)
- Occupation: Politician

Amjad Khan Afridi (Urdu: امجد خان آفریدی) is a Pakistani politician from Kohat District who thrice served as a member of the Provincial Assembly of Khyber Pakhtunkhwa, from March 2008 to March 2013, from May 2013 to May 2018, and from August 2018 to January 2023.

== Political career ==
He was elected to the Provincial Assembly of the North-West Frontier Province as an independent candidate from PF-37 (Kohat-I) in the 2008 North-West Frontier Province provincial election. He received 12,927 votes and defeated Aurangzeb Khan, another independent candidate. After the election, he joined the Awami National Party (ANP).

He was re-elected to the Provincial Assembly of Khyber Pakhtunkhwa as an independent candidate from PK-37 (Kohat-I) in the 2013 Khyber Pakhtunkhwa provincial election. He received 18,071 votes and defeated Ghulam Habib, a candidate of Jamiat Ulema-e-Islam (F) (JUI-F). After the election, he joined the Pakistan Tehreek-e-Insaf (PTI).

He was expelled from the PTI for violating party discipline in the 2015 local elections.

He was re-elected to the Provincial Assembly of Khyber Pakhtunkhwa as an independent candidate from PK-80 (Kohat-I) in the 2018 Khyber Pakhtunkhwa provincial election. He received 29,279 votes and defeated Aftab Alam Afridi, a candidate of PTI.

On 17 February 2021, he joined the Pakistan People's Party (PPP) with his father, Shammim Afridi.

He contested the 2024 Khyber Pakhtunkhwa provincial election as a candidate of the PPP from PK-90 Kohat-I, but was unsuccessful. He received 35,143 votes and was defeated by Aftab Alam Afridi, an independent candidate supported by the PTI.
