= Asia's Singing Superstar =

- Hosted by: Ahsan Khan; Shweta Pandit
- Judges: Shafqat Amanat Ali; Shankar Mahadevan; Ghulam Ali; Suresh Wadkar
- Winner: Muhammad Taqui

Release
- Original release: 31 October 2015 – 30 January 2016

Asia's Singing Superstar was a televised Pakistani singing competition. It was hosted by Shweta Pandit and Ahsan Khan, and the winner was Sneha Shankar.

The judges were Shafqat Amanat Ali and Shanker Mahadevan.

== Show ==
The competition took place from late October 2015 to late January 2016. Two contestants were neither Indian nor Pakistani: Yasmina Alidodva from Tajikistan, and Ian Cris Tocle from the Philippines.

There was no age limit for the contestants.

== Grand finale ==
The show's grand finale was held on 30 January 2016. Ghulam Ali, one of the judges, was absent, and Suresh Wadkar replaced him on the panel. The winner was Sneha Shankar from Shafqat Amanat Ali Team.
