= Piracha =

Muslim community in Pakistan and India

Paracha (Punjabi: پَراچہ) or Piracha (Urdu: پِراچہ) is a Muslim trading community and surname in Pakistan and India, most common in the Punjab region.

== Etymology ==
The name "Piracha" is believed to have been derived from parcha (lit. 'cloth'), one of the main items which they used to trade in. According to Ahmad Hasan Dani, however, the term is derived from prachyas (lit. 'eastern').

== History ==
According to Christophe Jaffrelot, Pirachas were the early Khatri converts to Islam. The historians Robina Yasmin and J. S. Grewal also consider them to have converted to Islam from the Khatri and Arora castes of Punjab. According to B. N. Puri, the Parachas of the Salt Range had their headquarters at Makhad. They are reported to have moved there during the reign of Shah Jahan, although another account states them to be the Khatris of Lahore who were deported there by Zaman Shah. Another reference suggests that "Paracha" as a tribal designation had been in common use in the ancient Gandhara region, with Dani stating them to have been engaged in trade between central Asia and the Indus valley since the era of Kushan Empire. According to Jaffrelot, the community takes pride in its ancient origins and some of them add the title of rajah to their names.

== Notable people with surname ==
- Ehsan-ul-Haq Piracha, Pakistani politician
- Farid Ahmad Paracha, Pakistani politician
- Hamza Paracha, Pakistani cricketer
- Javed Ibrahim Paracha, Pakistani politician
- Nadeem Farooq Paracha, Pakistani cultural critic
- Saifullah Khan Paracha, Pakistani politician
- Saifullah Paracha, Pakistani Islamist
- Uzair Paracha, Pakistani Islamist

=== Fictional characters ===
- Kaneez Paracha, a character from Ackley Bridge
- Nasreen Paracha, a character from Ackley Bridge

== See also ==
- Khatri Muslims
- Punjabi Saudagaran-e-Delhi
