= Aaj Rang Hai =

Song
- Genre: Qawwali
- Songwriter(s): Amir Khusrau

Aaj Rang Hai (Urdu: آج رنگ ہے; Hindi: आज रंग है; transl. Today There is a Glow) also known as Rang or Rung (transl. Color) is a Qawwali written by the 13th-century Sufi poet, Amir Khusrau in Hindavi and Braj Bhasha dialects. In the song, Khusrau describes to his mother his ecstasy upon finding his murshid (spiritual master) in the Sufi saint Nizamuddin Auliya. The song is a staple of most Qawwali sessions in North India and Pakistan, especially in the Chishti shrines of Delhi. It is traditionally sung as a closing piece at the end of a Qawwali session.

The song is celebratory in tone and holds a prominent place in the landscape of Sufi music. The word "rang" or "rung" literally translates into "color." The theme of saturated colors, dyes, and hues is a well-known motif in Sufi poetry and imagery and is understood to symbolize union between the seeker and God (as the Beloved). In the context of the song, however, "rang" or "rung" refers to the happiness, splendor, or glow that Khusrau feels after having met his pir (spiritual guide). In this sense, "rang" or "rung" symbolizes Khusrau's euphoric and enraptured state, and this is borne out later in the song where Khusrau repeatedly refers to his world now being ablaze with divine light and a sublime glow. Consistent with Sufi poetry, the song intentionally blurs the lines between the seeker, the beloved, the spiritual master, and God.

The 1978 Indian film Junoon opens with a rendition of Aaj Rung Hai, and the film's plot sees the poem employed as a symbol of rebellion. In 2015 movie indian musical trio Nizami Bandhu sung Aaj Rang Hai in the movie Bajrangi Bhaijaan. The song has been sung by numerous vocalists over the years, notably by renowned qawwali singer Nusrat Fateh Ali Khan and Sufi vocalist Abida Parveen. Excerpts from the qawwali were incorporated into the song Jhin Min Jhini from the soundtrack of Vishal Bhardwaj's 2004 film, Maqbool. In 2012, prominent Pakistani singer Hadiqa Kiani performed a rendition of the song in Season 5 of Coke Studio Pakistan. In 2015, a version of this song was released by Shafqat Amanat Ali Khan as part of his third solo album Muh Dikhai. The renowned Qawwali singer Amjad Sabri also performed this song with Rahat Fateh Ali Khan in the season finale of Coke Studio Season 9. It was also featured in the 2017 Indian Hindi-language film Angrezi Mein Kehte Hain, where it was sung by Jatinder Pal Singh, Sameer Naza, Mahesh Kumar Rao, and Mustafa with additional lyrics by Yogesh and music by Oni-Adil.
