= Abbas Khan Afridi =

Pakistani politician (1970–2025)

Senator Abbas Khan Afridi
- عباس خان آفریدی

Minister for Textiles
- In office March 2014 – June 2015
- President: Mamnoon Hussain
- Prime Minister: Nawaz Sharif
- Preceded by: Khurram Dastgir

Personal details
- Born: Abbas Khan Afridi; 1 September 1970 Kohat, North-West Frontier Province, Pakistan
- Died: 6 June 2025 (aged 54) Kohat, Khyber Pakhtunkhwa, Pakistan
- Party: PMLN (2018–2024)
- Relations: Amjad Khan Afridi (brother)
- Children: 5
- Parent: Shammim Afridi (father)
- Occupation: Politician; Businessman

Abbas Khan Afridi (Urdu: عباس خان آفریدی; 1 September 1970 – 6 June 2025) was a Pakistani politician and businessman who served as the Federal Minister of Textile Industry in 2014-2015 and had been a member of the Senate of Pakistan. Afridi was the second-highest tax payer in the country in 2013.

== Background ==
Belonging to Kohat in the North-West Frontier Province (now Khyber Pakhtunkhwa), his father Shammim Afridi and his brother Amjad Khan Afridi are both politicians.

== Business career ==
Afridi was the founder and CEO of Afridi Traders and held shares in other projects as well.

== Political career ==
Afridi was elected to the Senate of Pakistan in March 2009 as an Independent candidate. He was sworn in as Federal Minister of the Textile Industry on 19 March 2014.

He contested the 2018 Pakistani general election from NA-32 Kohat as a candidate of the Pakistan Muslim League (N) (PML(N)), but was unsuccessful. He received 44,154 votes and was defeated by Shehryar Afridi, a candidate of Pakistan Tehreek-e-Insaf (PTI).

He contested the 2024 Pakistani general election from NA-35 Kohat as a candidate of PML(N), but was unsuccessful. He received 58,034 votes and was defeated by Shehryar Afridi, an independent candidate supported by PTI.

On 25 June 2024, he left the Pakistan Muslim League (N).

== Death ==
Afridi died on 6 June 2025 of burn injuries from a gas explosion, at his residence in Kohat. He was 54.
