= Javed Ibrahim Paracha =

Pakistani politician (1947–2023)

Mawlānā Javed Ibrahim Paracha
- جاوید ابراہیم پراچہ

Member of the National Assembly of Pakistan
- In office 1990–1997

Personal details
- Born: 29 May 1947 Kohat, NWFP Pakistan
- Died: 28 December 2023 (aged 76)
- Cause of death: Chronic kidney disease
- Party: Jamiat Ulema-e-Islam (F)
- Other political affiliations: PML (N)

Javed Ibrahim Paracha (1947 – 27 December 2023) was a Pakistani Islamic scholar and politician, who was a member of the National Assembly from Kohat.

Paracha died at the age of 76 in 2023.

== Biography ==
Paracha belonged to the Hindko-speaking Punjabi Paracha community of Kohat. He got his master's degrees in Islamiyat and Arabic from the Islamia University of Bahawalpur and the University of Peshawar.

He contested in 1997 Pakistani general election on the ticket of Pakistan Muslim League (N) and was elected MNA from Kohat. He later left PMLN and joined Jamiat Ulema-e-Islam (F) headed by Maulana Fazl-ur-Rehman.

Paracha was the chairman of World Prisoners Relief Commission and aided in the release of many Soviet soldiers from the custody of mujahideen. He was widely known for his sympathies with the al-Qaeda and the Taliban and made consistent efforts for the release of their members from the Pakistani prisons. He was termed as "al-Qaeda's lawyer" by the Jamestown Foundation and The Express Tribune.

Paracha died from chronic kidney disease in Kohat at the age of 76 in 2023.
