= Syed Iftikhar Hussain Gillani =

Pakistani politician

Syed Iftikhar Hussain Gilani (Urdu: سید افتخار حسین گیلانی; born 18 July 1940) is a Pakistani politician who served as Federal Minister of Law. He was born in Kohat, Khyber-Pakhtunkhwa Province, Pakistan.

He studied at Islamia College, Peshawar and later joined Forman Christian College, Lahore, in 1956. After studying law at the University of the Punjab from 1959–61, Iftikhar moved to Peshawar in 1967 to practice the Law.

In 1970 elections Iftikhar contested for the Provincial Assembly as an independent candidate. Losing his first election he joined the PPP in 1971.

Elected to Parliament in 1988 he served as Federal Minister for Law in the first government of Benazir Bhutto. He joined Pakistan Tehreek-e-Insaf on December 21, 2011 in Islamabad. On 26 October 2012, along with Iftikharuddin Khattak, he announced his decision to quit PTI and joined PML-N.

On 31 January 2021, reports of his second marriage with a 21-year-old girl circulated across social media in Pakistan which was verified by mainstream media outlets.
