= Parliamentary Special Committee on Kashmir =

The Parliamentary Special Committee on Kashmir is predominantly composed of senior MNAs and Senators of Pakistan. Its fundamental function is to raise the critical issue of Kashmir at national and international level. Its other key feature is its continuous progress in bringing all major political forces in one platform in order to pursue Kashmir cause. During the nineties, two Parliamentary Committees were established. The Kashmir Committee comprising 31 members, is one of the most important parliamentary bodies, and the slot of its chairman goes to a seasoned and respected politician. In the past, stalwarts like Nawabzada Nasrullah Khan, Chaudhry Muhammad Sarwar Khan Ch. Hamid Nasir Chattha, and Maulana Fazl-ur-Rehman held this important position. Because of the importance of the issue, when the Parliament was not in position the former president Pervez Musharraf also formulated a National Kashmir Committee headed by the Kashmir veteran leader Sardar Abdul Qayyum.

The first one, comprising 24 members (MNAs: 21 & Senators: 3) was headed by late Nawabzada Nasrullah Khan, MNA (December, 1993 – November, 1996); whereas the second, with 26 members (MNAs) was led by late Chaudhry Muhammad Sarwar Khan, MNA (May, 1997 – October, 1999). The third Parliamentary Kashmir Committee was established in June, 2004 with Ch. Hamid Nasir Chattha, MNA its chairman. The Committee comprised 49 members (MNAs: 36 & Senators: 13) and continued until November, 2007. Fourteen of its Members were Ministers also. Chairman of Kashmir Committee has been accorded status of Federal Minister in Pakistan.

Current chairman of Kashmir Committee is Shehryar Khan Afridi.
