= Shammim Afridi =

Pakistani politician

Senator Shammim Afridi
- شمیم آفریدی

Member of the Senate of Pakistan
- In office 12 March 2018 – 12 March 2024

Personal details
- Party: PPP (2021–present)
- Other political affiliations: PMLN (2018–2021)
- Children: Abbas Khan Afridi; Amjad Khan Afridi

Shammim Afridi is a Pakistani politician who has been a Member of the Senate of Pakistan, since March 2018. He was Secretary Finance JWP Balochistan when Nawab Akbar Bugti was President of JWP.

== Political career ==
Afridi was elected to the Senate of Pakistan as an independent candidate on general seat from FATA in the 2018 Pakistani Senate election. He joined Pakistan Muslim League (N) (PML-N) after getting elected. He took his oath as Senator on 12 March 2018 and joined the treasury benches, led by PML-N.
