= Fuzön =

Musical band from Pakistan

- Origin: Karachi, Sindh, Pakistan
- Genres: Pop; pop rock
- Years active: 2001–2004; 2007–present
- Labels: Sound Master (2001 – 2004); The Musik Records (2007 – present)
- Members: Khurram Iqbal; Shallum Asher Xavier; Imran Momina
- Past members: Rameez Mukhtar; Shafqat Amanat Ali

Fuzön (Urdu: فیوزن – literal English pronunciation: "fusion") is a pop rock band from Karachi, Sindh, Pakistan formed in 2001. The name was derived from fusion, as the former lead vocalist of the band, Shafqat Amanat Ali describes the band as a fusion of Pakistani classical music and modern soft rock music blended with the Sufi Style of singing.

Fuzön encompasses hybrid styles of pop and rock instrumentation. "Fuzon was one of the innovative bands of the new millennium, as they gave us a timeless album like Saagar."

== History ==
Shallum Asher Xavier and Imran Momina were the founding members, who decided to put their heads together as they realised the similarities between their musical ideas and tastes.

Meanwhile, Shafqat Amanat Ali, who had been singing for a few years, had happened to drop into Immo's recording studio for an assignment. Shafqat's vocals so impressed the duo, that he was signed up with Shallum and Immu to form the band "Fuzön". "The year 2011 marks the 10th anniversary of the three-member band that has made a significant contribution to Pakistani music."

Shafqat had to leave the band to concentrate more on his solo projects. He was replaced by Rameez Mukhtar, the main vocalist in 2011.

== Band members ==
- Emu (Imran Momina) – keyboards

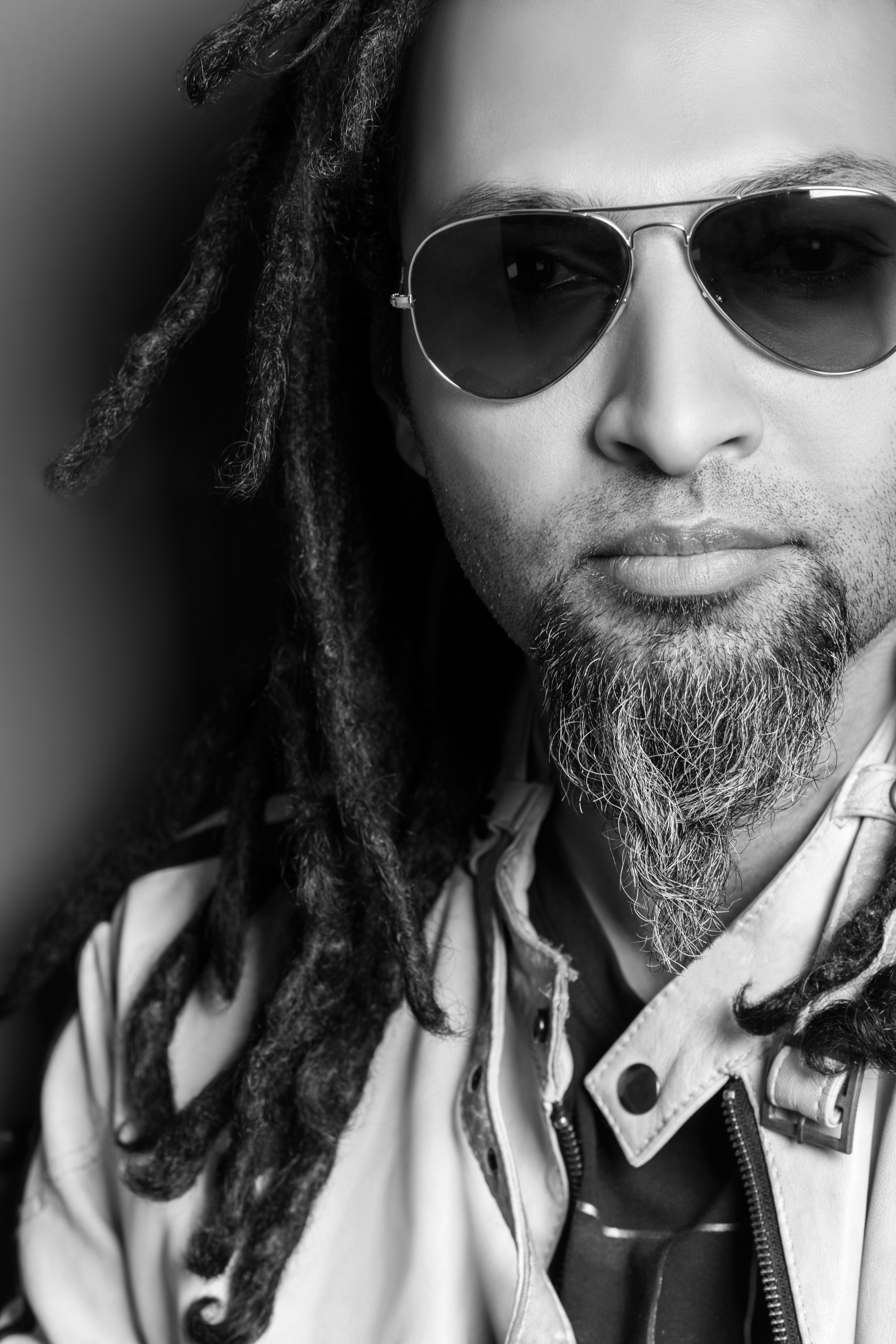
Imran momina aka Emu

- Shallum Asher Xavier – Guitarist

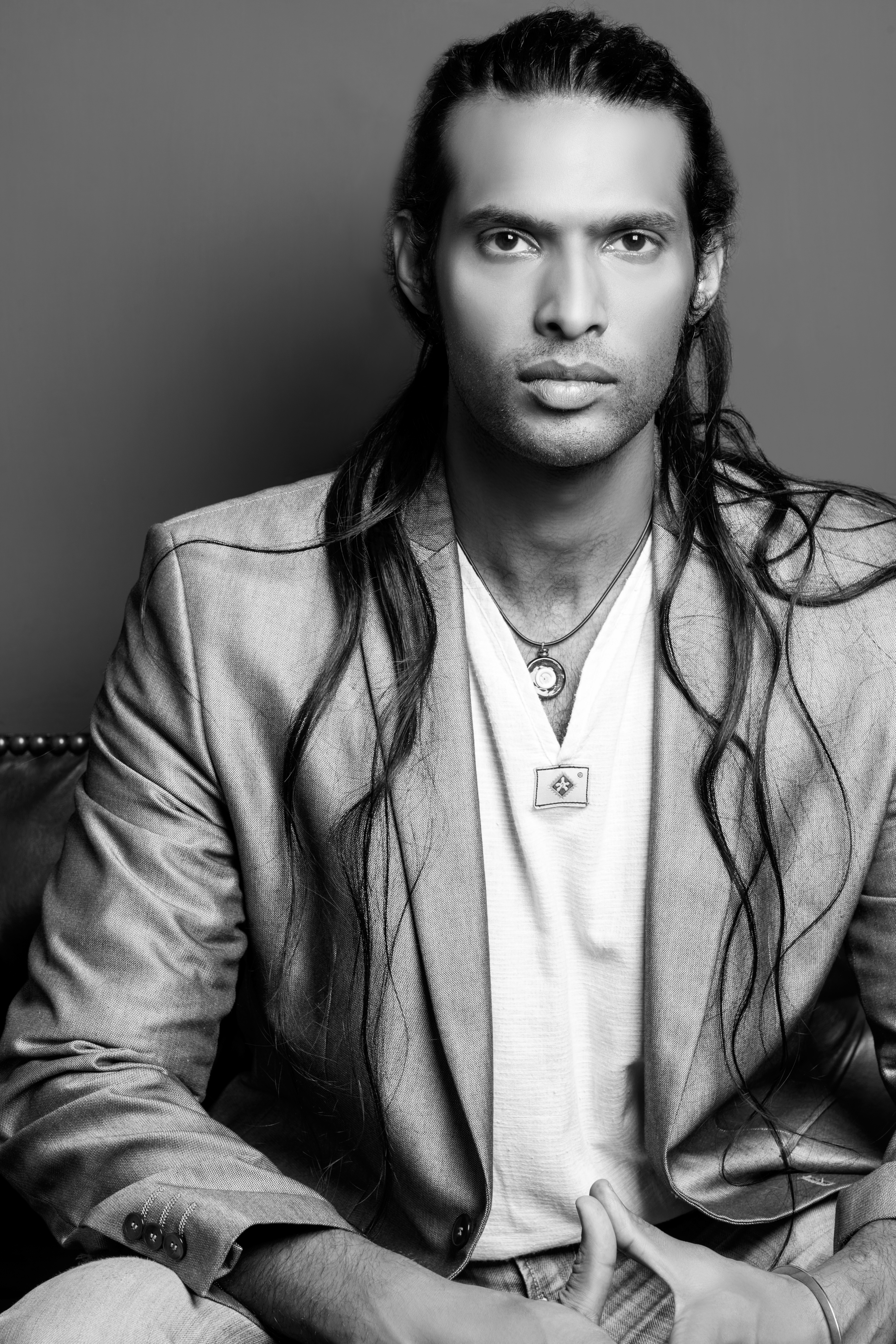
Shallum Xavier-Guitarist

- Rameez Mukhtar (main vocalist in 2011)
- Khurram Iqbal – Vocalist

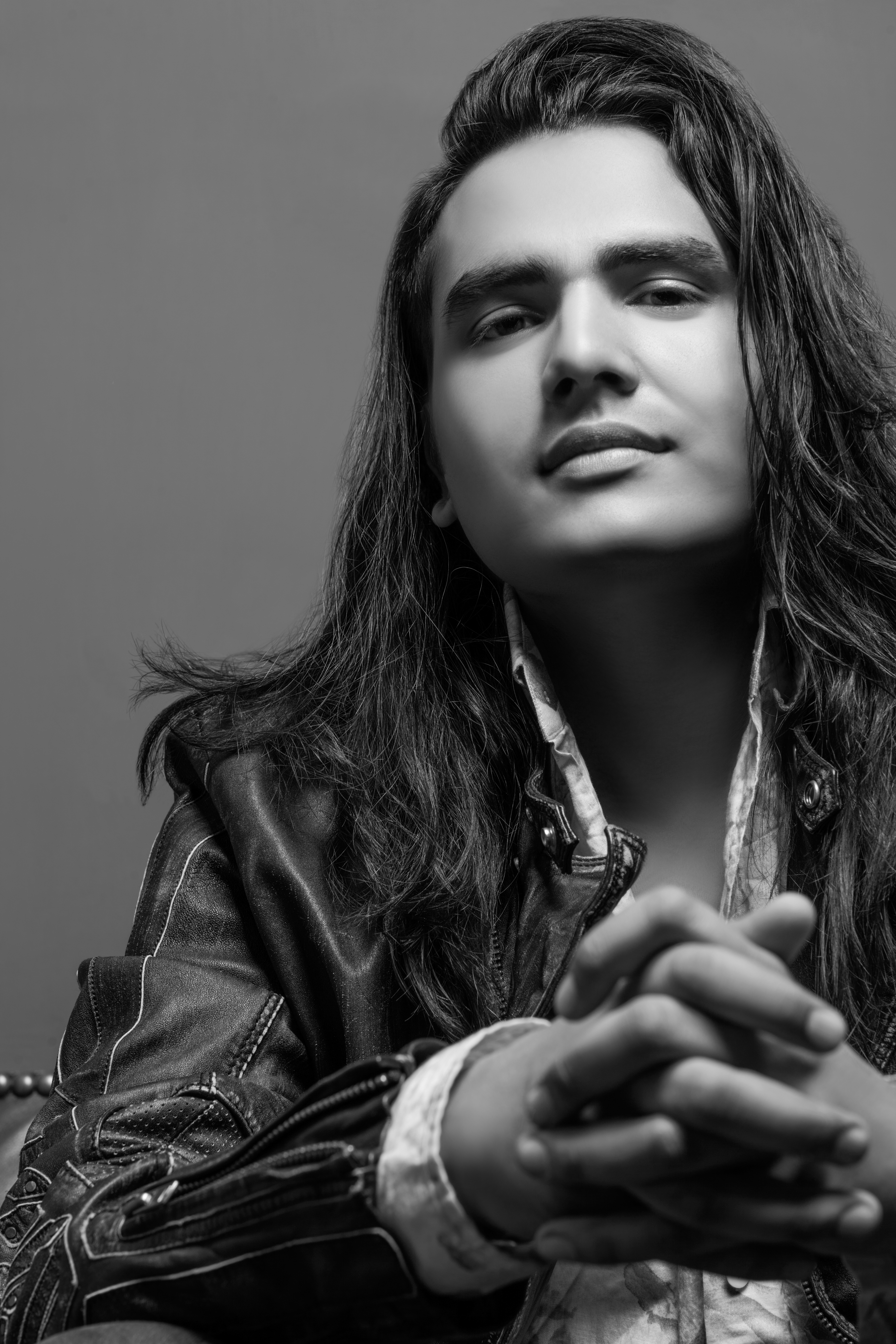
Khurram Iqbal- Vocalist

== Discography ==
Saagar (Virgin Records; CD; Rs. 199, Cassette; Rs. 65) features 12 tracks, with a common strain of pop melodies blended with Pakistani classical and folk vocals. The opening track Aakhon Kay Saagar gave rise to their popularity within Pakistan. Following songs, Akhiyaan, Terey Bina and Khamaaj were played in heavy circulation on the TV and FM stations of Pakistan and India. Fuzon was the first band to release their debut album Saagar concurrently in both Pakistan and India. "Khamaaj is a very old song and Thumri was composed by the Patiala Gharana, while I composed Saagar."

=== Regular studio albums ===
- Saagar (2002)
- Journey (2008)
- Ik Ranjha (2015)

=== Singles ===
- Akhiyan Tou Olay Olay
- Aankhon Ke Sagar by Ali Hamza
- Khamaaj- Mora Saiyyan Mo Se Bole Na
- Tere Bina
- Deewane
- Neend Na Aaye
- Suna Suna
- Naadanian
- Pyar Na Raha

== Trivia ==
- 2001 – "Fuzon is formed as a band, fusing deeply meditative ragas with rock and jazz."
- Shafqat's first entry into Bollywood, India's Hindi language film industry, was the song "Mitwa" from the film Kabhi Alvida Na Kehna (2006).
- Shafqat can be heard in the song Yeh Hausla from the Nagesh Kukunoor film Dor.
- Shafqat has released his debut solo album "Tabeer" in September 2008.
- Fuzön's songs "Mora Saiyyan" and "Tere Bina" are featured in Nagesh Kukunoor's Hyderabad Blues 2.
- Fuzon Band wins the Best Video for Khamaaj at the Lux Style Awards.
- 2006 – "Shafqat Amanat Ali leaves the band and releases Mitwa, while Shallum wins the Best Guitarist Award in Pakistan at The Musik Awards."
- 2012 – Fuzon band members' newspaper interview about their Norway tour in 2012.

== See also ==
- List of Pakistani music bands
