= Nasir Kazmi =

Pakistani poet (1925–1972)

Nasir Raza Kazmi
- Born: Syed Nasir Raza Kazmi; 8 December 1925; Ambala, Punjab, British India
- Died: 2 March 1972 (aged 46); Lahore, Punjab, Pakistan
- Education: Islamia College, Lahore, Pakistan
- Occupations: Urdu poet, journalist, staff editor at Radio Pakistan, writer
- Writing career
- Pen name: Nasir
- Genre: Ghazal

Nasir Raza Kazmi (Urdu: سید ناصِر رضا كاظمی; 8 December 1925 - 2 March 1972) was an Urdu poet from Pakistan. Kazmi was born in Ambala, Punjab, British India.

Kazmi used simple words in his poetry, including "Chand", "Raat", "Baarish", "Mausam", "Yaad", "Tanhai", "Darya" and gave them life by his style of poetry. He was known for using chhotee beher or short verses in his poetry. His poetry continues to be used on Pakistan Television (PTV) shows as well as in India in Bollywood films.

== Early life and career ==
Kazmi emigrated from Ambala, India to Lahore, Pakistan (residing in Krishan Nagar / Islampura) in August 1947. In Lahore, he worked as the editor of the literary magazines Auraq Nau and Khayal. He also worked as a staff editor for Radio Pakistan, Lahore. He was frequently thought of as a melancholic poet, though most of his poetry is based on romantic happiness and hope.

Nasir Kazmi was influenced by the romantic poetry of Akhtar Sheerani and also took guidance in his poetry from the poet Hafeez Hoshiarpuri. He also had great admiration for the poetry of Mir Taqi Mir.

Some of his poetic collections were published as books, including Berg-i-Nai (1952), Deewaan (1972), Pehli Baarish (1975), Hijr Ki Raat Ka Sitara and Nishat-i-Khwab (1977). A few days before his death, Kazmi said in a television interview:

"Horse riding, hunting, wandering in a village, walking along the riverside, visiting mountains etc., were my favourite pastimes and probably this was the time when my mind got nourishment for loving nature and getting close to the expression of poetry. All my hobbies are related with fine arts, like singing, poetry, hunting, chess, love of birds, love of trees. ... I started writing poetry because I used to reflect that all the beautiful things, those I see and those in nature, are not in my hands, and they go away from me. Few moments of time which die, cannot be made alive. I think [they] can come alive in poetry, that is why I started writing poetry!"

== Commemorative postage stamp ==
In 2013, Pakistan Post released a commemorative postage stamp of Rs 15 denomination in its 'Men of Letters' series to commemorate Kazmi's death.

== Family ==
Kazmi's elder son, Basir Sultan Kazmi (born 1955, Pakistan), became a poet and dramatist. Writing in both Urdu and English, he earned an MBE for services to poetry. He has resided in England since 1990, where he was awarded the North West Playwrights Workshop Award in 1992 and published an abridged translation of his long play Bisaat (entitled "The Chessboard") along with several volumes of poetry both in Urdu and English. He is currently the Royal Literary Fund Fellow at the University of Chester.

Hassan Sultan Kazmi, the younger son of renowned poet Nasir Kazmi, is a distinguished poet, writer, and retired professor of Economics. Throughout his teaching career, he served at prominent institutions such as Islamic College Civil Lines and MAO College. Hassan pursued his education at Government College Lahore between 1969 and 1970. After a long and impactful career in academia, he retired on 31 December 2015.

== Death ==
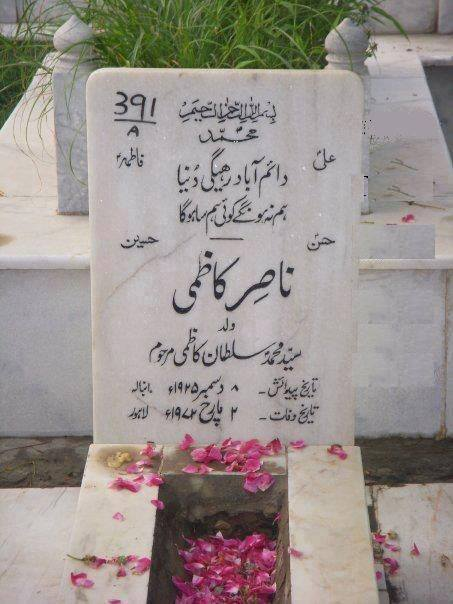
Nasir Kazmi's grave at Mominpura graveyard, Lahore, Pakistan

Nasir Kazmi died on 2 March 1972 at Lahore, Pakistan due to stomach cancer.

== Bibliography ==
Some of his books include:

=== Poetry ===
- Berg-i-Nai (1952)
- Deewaan (1972)
- Pehli Baarish (1975)
- Hijr Ki Raat Ka Sitara
- Nishat-i-Khwab (1977)
- Woh Tera Shaair, Woh Tera Nasir

=== Others ===
- San sattāvan merī nazạr men̲. On the Sepoy Rebellion of 1857.
- Sur kī chāyā : ek kathā. Versified play.
- K̲h̲ushk cashme ke kināre. Critical articles on Urdu literature.
- Nasir Kazmi ki dairy : chand pareshan kaghaz. Memoirs.
