= Saagar (album) =

Studio album by Fuzön
- Released: January 2002 (re-released in January, 2004)
- Recorded: 2001–2002
- Studios: Planet Audio, Karachi, Pakistan; Sound Master, Karachi, Pakistan
- Genres: Pop rock, alternative rock, fusion
- Length: 62:50
- Labels: Virgin Records; Amazing Productions/Empire Music Limited
- Producers: Imran Momina, Shallum Asher Xavier

Fuzön chronology
Saagar (2002)	Jöurney (2008)

Saagar (Urdu: ساگر; Hindi: सागर; transl. Sea) is the debut album by the Pakistani pop rock band, Fuzön, released in January, 2002 by Amazing Productions/Empire Music Limited in Pakistan and by Virgin Records in India. The album is also known eponymously as Fuzön and was re-released in 2004 by the Sound Master record label. Saagar is noteworthy for embedding elements of Hindustani classical ragas within pop rock and jazz compositions, and it is widely considered a pathbreaking album for the way it revolutionized Pakistani music in the 2000s. The album also made history by becoming the first album to be released by a band simultaneously in both India and Pakistan.

== Overview ==
Recorded at Planet Audio Studios and mixed and mastered in Sound Master Studios (both in Karachi, Pakistan), Saagar was among the first albums in Pakistan to be produced entirely using digital recording equipment at a time when the analog format was still the norm. The overall reaction to Saagar was generally positive and it was both commercially successful and critically well received. All three founding members of Fuzön — producer and keyboardist Imran (Emu) Momina, guitarist Shallum Asher Xavier, and lead vocalist Shafqat Amanat Ali — were propelled into fame across the subcontinent as a result of the unprecedented success of Saagar.

The lead single of the album, "Aankhon Ke Saagar" as well as the songs "Khamaj" (also known as "Mora Saiyaan") and "Akhian" received significant airtime on music channels and FM radio stations in both India and Pakistan. The tracks "Khamaj (Mora Saiyaan)" and "Teray Bina" were also featured in the soundtrack of Nagesh Kukunoor's 2004 film, Hyderabad Blues 2. Lead vocalist Shafqat Amanat Ali has delivered live performances of several tracks from the album — with variations in arrangement — including "Khamaj (Mora Saiyaan)," "Aankhon Ke Saagar," and "Akhiyan" for Coke Studio Pakistan, Coke Studio India, and MTV Unplugged India.

== Composition and songwriting ==
The album is notable for its unique soundscape that showcases influences of Persian, Arabic, and Indian music, as well as western pop rock. The songs in the album feature a common strain where aspects of Hindustani classical ragas are woven into pop melodies, combined with traditional Pakistani folk vocals and the Sufi rock style of singing. Discussing Fuzön's approach to composing the tracks for Saagar, Ali shared: "It wasn’t like I was trying to be a rebel; breaking convention. I was only taking a fresh route to the ragas to place them in a global soundscape. After all, classical elements lend soul to a composition. Music derives its meditative quality from them." The overall tone of the album is pensive and meditative, with varying notes of rock and jazz.

"Aankhon Ke Saagar" was the first song to be composed and recorded for the album and went on to become immensely popular in India and Pakistan, including becoming the number one song in Pakistan. Recalling how the song came about, Shallum Asher Xavier narrates that he and Shafqat were at Momina's recording studio and were feeling bored. He started strumming a melody on his guitar that he had been developing for a while and Shafqat starting humming along spontaneously. Shafqat recalls, "I really liked the melody, so I started writing some dummy lyrics [and] wrote the lines 'aankhon kay saagar, honton kay saaghar' then and there, and by the end of the jamming session, we had a rough picture of the song in mind." The song is based on raga Aiman, also known as Yaman.

"Khamaj (Mora Saiyaan)" is a reimagined rendition of a traditional thumri from the Patiala gharana tradition of music. Lead vocalist Shafqat Amanat Ali stated in an interview: "with Mora Saiyaan...set in raag Khamaj, I introduced the contemporary audience to a thumri (evocative love poetry) that my elders had been singing for generations." Seven out of the 12 songs in Saagar incorporate elements from Hindustani classical ragas and some of them — "Khamaj," "Madhbanti," and "Malhaar" — are eponymously named after the ragas upon which they are based.

== Reception and impact ==
Saagar achieved significant commercial success and sold a record 500,000 copies in Pakistan, a singular feat for an album at the time. It was also critically acclaimed for its innovative use of classical ragas in pop rock compositions, its "experimentation and collaboration between different soundscapes and musical disciplines," and its "stylistic reinventions."

Saagar has been described as "timeless" and "game-changing" and has been lauded for making a "significant contribution to Pakistani music." The album was also praised for being among the first to make fusion music "commercially palatable for a mass audience." Reflecting on the legacy of the album, Rafay Mahmood of The Express Tribune (Pakistan) wrote: "For the first time, people witnessed a trained singer from a classical gharana (in this case Patiala) making perfect use of his vocal range to add depth to rock and roll riffs in arrangements. "Aankhon Ke Saagar" by the trio of Immu, Shallum, and Shafqat took the industry by storm as it was something truly unimaginable, especially at that time. This was a mainstream rock band finding a following across age brackets in every household." Referring to the track, "Akhian," Mahmood wrote: "Featuring Shafqat Amanat Ali, one of the most impeccable vocalists of the subcontinent, along with Imran Momina, and Shallum Xavier, "Akhian" changed the landscape of the music industry in the early 2000s." The Express Tribune (Pakistan) wrote, "songs like “Khamaj” and “Teray Bina”...are rendered timeless and will be written in golden words in the history of Pakistani pop." In 2022, The Telegraph (India) described the song "Khamaj" as a "timelessly soothing classic."

== Awards ==
Saagar went on to win multiple awards. In 2003, it won Best Emerging Talent at the Lux Style Awards, and Best Composer Award and Best Ballad Award at the Indus Music Awards. In 2004, the music video of "Khamaj (Mora Saiyaan)," directed by Saqib Malik, starring Pakistani actor Shaan Shahid, won the Best Video Award at the Lux Style Awards. The video was inspired by Guru Dutt's romantic drama film Kaagaz Ke Phool, and it was the most expensive music video made in Pakistan at the time.

== Track listing ==
All music is written, arranged, and composed by Fuzön. "Piyar Na Raha" is written by John Mall and supplemental lyrics for "Dooriyan" are written by Muhammad Nasir.

Saagar
No.	Title	Length
1.	"Akhian"	4:03
2.	"Teray Bina"	6:30
3.	"Aankhon Ke Saagar"	5:45
4.	"Piyar Na Raha"	4:54
5.	"Dooriyan"	5:18
6.	"Madhbanti"	6:03
7.	"Deewane"	4:10
8.	"Malhaar"	3:58
9.	"Baatein"	5:42
10.	"Khamaj"	6:58
11.	"Nadanian"	4:19
12.	"Aankhon Ke Saagar (Guitar mix)"	5:45
Total length:		62:50

== Credits ==
- Shafqat Amanat Ali – vocals, backing vocals
- Shallum Asher Xavier – lead guitar, backing vocals
- Imran (Emu) Momina – keyboards, backing vocals
