= Shehryar Afridi =

Pakistani politician

Shehryar Khan Afridi
- شہریارخان آفریدی
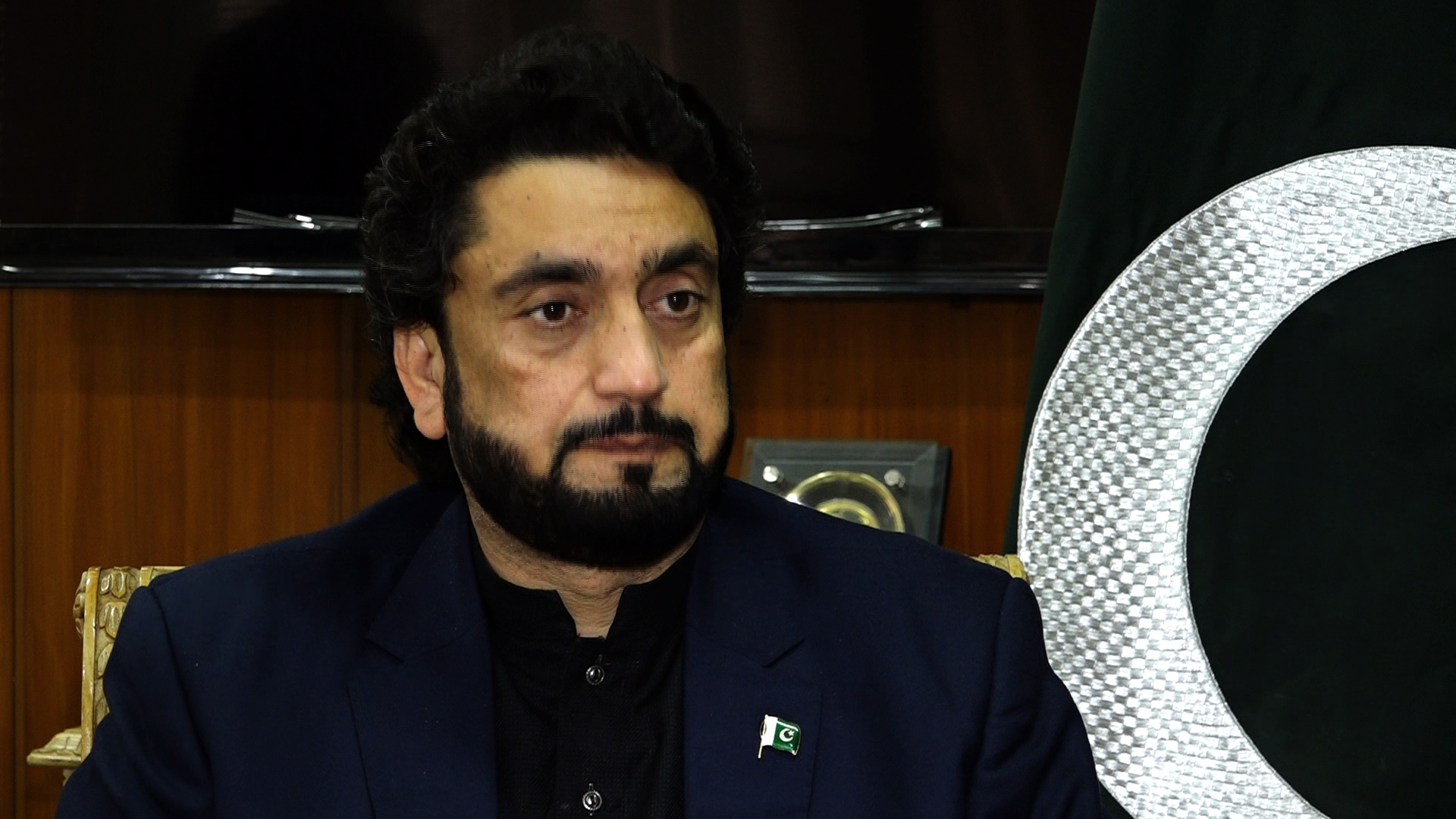

Chairperson of the Parliamentary Special Committee on Kashmir
- In office 13 May 2020 – April 2022
- President: Arif Alvi
- Prime Minister: Imran Khan
- Preceded by: Syed Fakhar Imam

Minister of State for Narcotics Control
- In office 9 April 2020 – 25 September 2020
- President: Arif Alvi
- Prime Minister: Imran Khan
- Minister: Azam Swati
- In office 11 June 2019 – 6 April 2020
- President: Arif Alvi
- Prime Minister: Imran Khan
- Preceded by: Ali Mohammad Mahar

Minister of State for States and Frontier Region
- In office 18 April 2019 – 25 September 2020
- President: Arif Alvi
- Prime Minister: Imran Khan
- Minister: Sahabzada Mehboob Sultan

Minister of State for Interior
- In office 31 August 2018 – 18 April 2019
- President: Arif Alvi
- Prime Minister: Imran Khan
- Succeeded by: Ijaz Ahmed Shah as Federal Minister

Member of the National Assembly of Pakistan
- Incumbent
- Assumed office 29 February 2024
- Constituency: NA-35 Kohat
- In office 13 August 2018 – 17 January 2023
- Constituency: NA-32 (Kohat)
- In office 1 June 2013 – 31 May 2018
- Constituency: NA-14 (Kohat)

Personal details
- Born: 12 March 1971 (age 55) Kohat, Khyber Pakhtunkhwa, Pakistan
- Party: PTI (2013–present)
- Other political affiliations: IND (2002)
- Education: University of Peshawar

Shehryar Khan Afridi (Urdu: شہریار خان آفریدی; born 12 March 1971) is a Pakistani politician who served as Chairperson of the Parliamentary Special Committee on Kashmir, in office from 13 May 2020 to April 2022. He served as the Minister of State for Interior from 31 August 2018 to 18 April 2019. He has been a member of the National Assembly of Pakistan since February 2024 and previously served as a member from August 2018 till January 2023 and June 2013 to May 2018. He also served as the Minister of State for States and Frontier Regions (SAFRON) from 18 April 2019 until 25 September 2020. He was also given an additional charge of the Ministry of Narcotics Control after the death of Ali Mohammad Mahar.

He resigned from National Assembly of Pakistan on order of Imran Khan on 10 April 2022.

== Early life and education ==
Afridi was born on 12 March 1971 into a Pashtun family of the Afridi tribe.

A native of Kohat in Khyber Pakhtunkhwa, his father Nadir Shah Afridi served as a district counsellor and later became a member of parliament, while one of his brothers, Major (r) Tariq Javed, worked in the bureaucracy following his retirement from the armed forces.

He received a Master's degree in International Relations from the University of Peshawar.

In May 2020, Afridi tested positive for COVID-19 during the coronavirus pandemic in Pakistan.

== Professional career ==
Before entering politics, Afridi worked for a multinational company in Germany.

== Political career ==
=== Member of the National Assembly of Pakistan ===
Afridi ran for the seat of National Assembly of Pakistan as an independent candidate from Constituency NA-14 (Kohat) in the 2002 Pakistani general election but was unsuccessful. He received 12,083 votes and lost the seat to a candidate of Muttahida Majlis-e-Amal.

Afridi was elected to the National Assembly as a candidate of Pakistan Tehreek-e-Insaf (PTI) from Constituency NA-14 (Kohat) in the 2013 Pakistani general election. He received 68,129 votes and defeated a candidate of Jamiat Ulema-e Islam (F) (JUI-F). He was re-elected to the National Assembly as a candidate of PTI from Constituency NA-32 (Kohat) in the 2018 Pakistani general election. He received 82,248 votes and defeated Gohar Mohammad Khan Bangash, a candidate of Muttahida Majlis-e-Amal (MMA).

=== Minister of State for Interior ===
On 28 August 2018, he was named by Prime Minister Imran Khan as Minister of State for Interior. On 31 August 2018, he was sworn in as Minister of State for Interior in the federal cabinet of PM Imran Khan.

=== Minister of State for States and Frontier Regions ===
On 18 April 2019, he resigned as Minister of State for Interior, and was appointed as the minister of state for States and Frontier regions.

=== Minister of State for Narcotics Control (Additional Charge) ===
Later he was given the additional portfolio of Ministry of Narcotics Control. On 29 September 2020 after the approval of Prime Minister Imran Khan, Minister of State for Narcotics Shehryar Afridi was removed from the post.

== Controversies ==
=== Residence ===
In October 2018, Afridi was accused of using public funds worth millions of rupees to renovate and redecorate his new residence. Following which Prime Minister Imran Khan took notice of the issue and ordered Federal Investigation Agency to carry out the investigation.

=== May 9 riots ===
In 2023, he was put under arrest along with many leaders of the PTI following the May 9 riots and the perceived attack on the country's institutions and military by the party.
