= Ali Baksh Jarnail =

Musician from India (1850–1920)

- Born: 1850
- Died: 1920 (aged 69–70)
- Genre: Hindustani Classical Music
- Occupation: vocalist (Founder of Patiala gharana along with Fateh Ali Khan (Aliya-Fattu duo)) in the 19th century

Ustad Ali Baksh Jarnail Khan (1850 – 1920) was classical singer from Indian subcontinent. Together with his friend Fateh Ali Khan, he founded the Patiala Gharana in the 19th century. They used to sing together as a team back then and were called Aliya-Fattu duo.

== Biography ==
Patiala gharana has claimed to combine the musical traditions of Delhi gharana, Gwalior gharana and Jaipur-Atrauli Gharana. Patiala gharana has many notable pupils including Ustad Bade Ghulam Ali Khan (1902–1968), Malika Pukhraj (1912 – 4 February 2004), Gauhar Jan (1875–1930) and the renowned ghazal singer of Pakistan Ghulam Ali.

Ustad Ali Baksh Jarnail regularly sang with Fateh Ali Khan in late 19th century and early part of the 20th century. They both were trained in music by Tanras Khan and Kalu Khan of Delhi gharana as well as Haddu Khan and Hassu Khan of Gwalior gharana.

Before the partition of India in 1947, Ali Baksh Jarnail was the court musician of the Maharaja in Patiala. Ali Baksh Jarnail had one son, Ustad Akhtar Hussain (1900–1972) who, then, had 3 sons Amanat Ali Khan (1922 – 18 September 1974), Bade Fateh Ali Khan and Hamid Ali Khan who have been carrying the torch of Patiala gharana in Pakistan for many decades now. In India, khyal Singers such as Bade Ghulam Ali Khan and Gohar Ali Khan had innovated syncretic "Patiala-Kasuri" styles. Asad Amanat Ali Khan and Shafqat Amanat Ali are the newer generation names in Patiala gharana in Pakistan. In India, the torch is borne by Munawar Ali Khan, Jawaad Ali Khan, Mazhar Ali Khan, Johar Ali Khan, and Raza Ali Khan.
