= Raga Boyz =

Pakistani musical band

Raga Boyz راگا بوائز
- Origin: Lahore, Punjab, Pakistan
- Genres: Sufi rock; Classical
- Years active: 2006–present
- Labels: T-Series; Zee Music; Beyond Records
- Members: Wali Hamid Ali Khan; Nayab Ali Khan; Inam Ali Khan
- Website: www.ragaboyzband.com

Raga Boyz (راگا بوائز) is a Pakistani sufi rock band from Lahore, Pakistan belonging to the Patiala Gharana of classical music. The band consists of three brothers Nayab Ali Khan, Wali Hamid Ali Khan and Inam Ali Khan. Being the sons of Pakistani classical legend Ustad Hamid Ali Khan, they are the ninth generation of Patiala Gharana...

Raga Boyz is led by Wali Hamid Ali Khan who is the lead vocalist, a pop, semi-classical singer and music composer. The eldest member Nayab Ali Khan is a classical and semi-classical singer while Inam Ali Khan is a hardcore classical singer.

== History ==
Raga Boyz was formed in 2006. The name of the band was coined by Pakistani classical maestro Ustad Hamid Ali Khan who is the father of the sibling trio of Raga Boyz Band.

== Music ==
Raga Boyz launched their first music album ‘Yeh Jaan Lo’ in 2008. Their second album ‘Raga Rocks’ was released in 2013 by Times Music India. The Bollywood film Maximum (2012) featured the band's song ‘Maan Quntu Mola’ in 2012. Raga Boyz's track 'Ali Ali' was featured in Indian Bengali film Bangla Naache Bhangra.

Raga Boyz did music of the 2016 Pakistani romantic comedy film Ishq Positive, directed by Noor Bukhari. The music was released in the official soundtrack album by Beyond Records in July 2016.

In 2019, Zee Music Company released Wali Hamid Ali Khan's solo track "Mahi Ve". It has been composed and sung by Wali Hamid Ali Khan.

Raga Boyz made the music of the Pakistani film Qulfi, directed by Mashhood Qadri. Wali Hamid Ali Khan served as the composer for the film's soundtrack, while Rahat Fateh Ali Khan was also featured. Ustad Hamid Ali Khan also recorded a track for the film.

In 2021, the band collaborated with the legendary Sufi singer Abida Parveen for the track ‘Ghareeb Nawaz’ - an ancient fusion of Sufi and rock. The band released their single ‘Karam’ in collaboration with the classical singer Ustad Hamid Ali Khan. Their latest release "Ghan Garjat" is a Bandish in Raag Miya Malhar by Patiala Gharana.

In 2025, Raga Boyz composed and produced the official anthem for the Pakistan Super League franchise Lahore Qalandars, titled "Hum Hein Lahore Qalandar", with music production by Wali Hamid Ali Khan and lyrics composed by Ali Sajid. It was officially released on 12 April 2025 as the Lahore Qalandars’ anthem for the PSL's tenth edition.

== Performances ==
Raga Boyz has performed in over 18 countries including United Kingdom, United States, India, Morocco, China, Saudi Arabia. In 2016, Raga Boyz was invited at the Fez Sacred Music Festival in Morocco to represent Pakistan.

The band has also performed at India's Kala Ghoda Arts Festival Raga boyz performs frequently in the United States. They performed at Pakistan United Nations Mission in New York in 2015. The band was invited by the Ismaili Centre, Toronto in Canada for a concert series in 2023.

== Discography ==
=== Films ===
Year	Song	Film
2012	"Man Kunto Maula"	Maximum
2013	"Ali Ali"	Bangla Naache Bhangra
2016	"Dil Ka Panchi"	Ishq Positive
2016	"Tera Nika Jiya"	Ishq Positive
2016	"Naughty"	Ishq Positive
2016	"Kina Tenu"	Ishq Positive
2024	"Party song"	Qulfee

=== Singles ===
Year	Song title	Music label
2023	Ghan Garjat	Sufiscore
2021	Ghareeb Nawaz	Sufiscore
2021	Karam	Sufiscore
2025	Hum Hain Lahore Qalandar Anthem PSL10	Lahore Qalandar

Awards

*2008* Asia youth pacific Award From China

*2009* Zee Punjabi music award

*2010* MTV Pakistan Award

*2010* world music festival award from Australia

*2013* Zee Cine Award from India

*2018* House of Commerce Award from London UK

*2022* USA Senator citation certificate for the best Asian singers.

*2024* Pakistan Music & Media Award from United Kingdom.

== See also ==
- Patiala Gharana
- Hamid Ali Khan
- Akhtar Hussain
- Bade Fateh Ali Khan
- Amanat Ali Khan
- Asad Amanat Ali Khan
- Shafqat Amanat Ali Khan
