= Sadaat Shafqat Amanat =

Pakistani singer, songwriter, composer

- سادات شفقت امانت
- Born: Sadaat Ali Baksh; 12 November 1997 (age 28); Lahore, Punjab, Pakistan
- Education: Regent's University London
- Occupations: Singer; songwriter; composer
- Years active: 2019–present
- Father: Shafqat Amanat Ali
- Relatives: Amanat Ali Khan (grandfather); Bade Fateh Ali Khan (granduncle); Hamid Ali Khan (granduncle); Asad Amanat Ali Khan (uncle)
- Family: Patiala Gharana
- Musical career
- Genres: Pop; synthwave; sentimental ballad; Hindustani classical; semi-classical
- Instruments: Vocals; piano; guitar
- Labels: Coke Studio; 5P Records; Rearts Records; Ali Mustafa Productions

Sadaat Shafqat Amanat (Urdu: سادات شفقت امانت; pronounced [ˈsaːdaːt ˈʃəfkət əˈmaːnət]; born 12 November 1997) is a Pakistani pop singer, songwriter, and composer belonging to the Patiala Gharana tradition of music. Son of noted playback singer and classical vocalist Shafqat Amanat Ali, Amanat started training in Hindustani classical music at the age of three under the tutelage of his granduncles and prominent Patiala Gharana exponents Ustad Bade Fateh Ali Khan and Ustad Hamid Ali Khan.

== Early life and background ==
Sadaat Shafqat Amanat was born on 12 November 1997 in Lahore, Pakistan. He graduated from SICAS Lahore and attended Regent's University London from 2022 to 2023 where he pursued a bachelor's degree in film and screen production, but did not graduate, choosing to move back to Pakistan to focus on his music career.

Being born into a vocal gharana, Amanat has shared that he has learned music from many member of his family, but lists his father Shafqat Amanat Ali and granduncles Ustad Bade Fateh Ali Khan and Ustad Hamid Ali Khan as his primary teachers and musical influences.

== Career ==
Amanat made his singing debut in 2019, with the single "Tu," which he composed when he was 14 years old. The track was described as "a fresh take on the 80s revivalist sound" and Amanat was noted for his "diverse range." In 2021, he was among the 75 Pakistani artists who collaborated on the single "Ao Ehad Karain," released by Coke Studio and the ISPR in observance of Pakistan's 81st Republic Day.

== Discography ==
=== Singles ===
- "Tu" (2019)
- "Ali Moula" (2019)
- "Kol Kol"(2020)
- "Ao Ehad Karain" (2021)
- "Mader-e-Meherban" (2021)
- "Mein Laonga" (2022)
- "More Saiyaan" (2023)
- "Kyun" (2024)
- "Chahd K Gayi" (2024)
- "Bahaar" (2024)

== See also ==
- Patiala Gharana
- Amanat Ali Khan
- Bade Fateh Ali Khan
- Shafqat Amanat Ali
