= Mazhar (disambiguation) =

The mazhar is a tambourine used in Arabic music.

Mazhar (Arabic: مظهر Maẓhar), an Arabic male given name meaning "appearance", may refer to:

== Given name ==
- Azrinaz Mazhar Hakim (born 1979), third wife of Sultan Hassanal Bolkiah of Brunei
- Mazhar Abbas (born 1958), Pakistani journalist
- Mazhar Alam Miankhel (born 1957), Justice of the Supreme Court of Pakistan
- Mazhar Alanson (born 1950), Turkish actor and pop musician
- Mazhar Ali Khan (disambiguation)
  - Mazhar Ali Khan (Journalist) (1917–1993), Pakistani left-wing journalist
  - Mazhar Ali Khan (painter), 19th century artist from Delhi
  - Mazhar Ali Khan (Singer) (born 1958), Hindustani classical vocalist of the Patiala Gharana
- Mazhar Hussain (born 1967), Pakistani cricketer
- Mazhar Kaleem (1942–2018), Pakistani novelist
- Mazhar Khaleghi (born 1939), Kurdish singer
- Mazhar Khan (cricketer) (born 1964), Pakistani cricketer who played for Oman
- Mazhar Khan (actor, born 1905) (1905–1950), Indian actor, producer, and director
- Mazhar Khan (actor, born 1955) (1955–1998), Bollywood actor and director
- Mazhar Krasniqi (1931–2019), Muslim community leader in New Zealand
- Mazhar Mahmood Qurashi (1925–2011), Pakistani physicist
- Mazhar Majeed (born 1975), British sporting agent and bookmaker
- Mazhar Müfit Kansu (1873–1948), Turkish civil servant and politician
- Mazhar Munir, British Pakistani television and film actor
- Mirza Mazhar Jan-e-Janaan (1699–1781), Urdu poet
- Mazhar Zaidi, British Pakistani film producer and journalist

== Surname ==
- Ahmed Mazhar (1917–2002), Egyptian actor
- Sanaa Mazhar (1932–2018), Egyptian actress

== Byname ==
- Osman Mazhar Pasha (1789–1861), Ottoman commander and governor

== See also ==
- Mazar (disambiguation)
- Mazaher
