= Samrat Pandit =

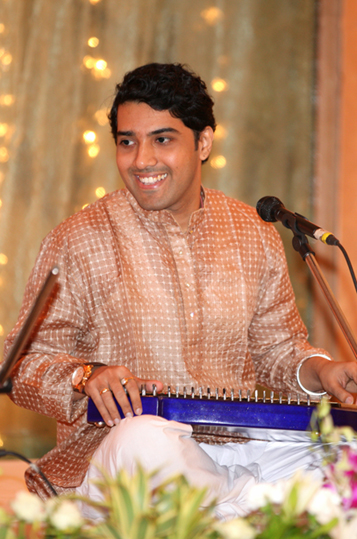
- Samrat performing in Mumbai in 2014

Background information
- Also known as: Samrat
- Born: 1982 (age 43–44); Kolkata, West Bengal, India
- Genres: Hindustani classical music : khayal, thumri, tappa, bhajan
- Occupation: Vocalist
- Years active: 2001–present
- Label: Questz World
- Website: samratpandit.com

Samrat Pandit (born in 1982) is an Indian classical vocalist. He sings khyal (pure classical genre) in the Patiala gharana (singing style), and semi-classical like thumri and Tappa.

== Early life ==
Samrat Pandit was born in Kolkata, India. He belongs to a family of musicians and is the 6th generation from his family into music. He was taught music by his father, Jagdish Prasad, a Hindustani classical singer, himself a direct disciple of Bade Ghulam Ali Khan.

At age five, Samrat participated in the "Bal Kalakar" program of All India Radio in Bhopal. He started touring with his father when he was adolescent, accompanying him on stage.

His mother, Sandhya Pandit, an English teacher at Kendriya Vidyalaya (Central Government school), accompanies him on stage, playing the tanpura.

== Career ==
Samrat launched his solo career in 2001, while continuing to offer vocal support in his father’s performances. He is a certified All India Radio artist since 2009. He participated in TV shows accompanying his father and as a solo artist, in local channels Om Bangla TV, government channel Doordarshan and national channel Zee 24 Taas.

He did his first solo album in 2012 "Patiala Prince", released with the support of Girija Devi, Satish Vyas, Samresh Chowdhury and Rashid Khan.

Samrat sings thumri, bhajan, tappa and khyal.

=== Performances in India ===
He performed at the Sawai Gandharva Bhimsen Festival as a solo artist in Pune, in 2012 and 2017.

He also performed at the Thumri Festival in Delhi, organized by Sahitya Kala Parishad, department of Art, culture and languages of the Government of Delhi, at Kamani Auditorium. In his native Kolkata, Samrat appeared in notable venues including the ITC Sangeet Research Academy in 2010 and the Salt Lake Music Conference in 2011. He performed with other musicians like Ramdas Palsule, Dilshad Khan and Ramkumar Mishra.

=== Tours ===
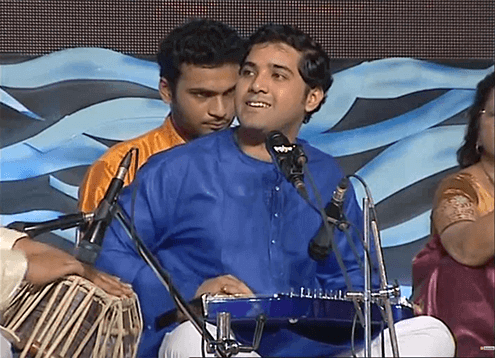
Samrat Pandit singing at Sawai Gandharva Bhimsen Festival, Pune 2012

- 2013 Europe : he participated in the fusion project of Nevcivan Özel in Cemal Reşit Rey Concert Hall, one of Turkey's major concert halls.
- 2015 North America and Europe, including concerts in London and Toronto.
- 2016 Europe : he was the first khayal singer to perform in the country of Lithuania in the capital Vilnius.
- 2018 Europe including shows in Germany and Greece

=== Music influences ===
Samrat's musical influences are his father Jagdish Prasad, Barkat Ali Khan, Bade Ghulam Ali Khan, Bhimsen Joshi, Ali Akbar Khan, Ravi Shankar, and the Ghazal He also listens to other musicians including Michael Jackson, and he appreciates world music and Balkan music.

== Personal life ==
Samrat has graduated in English at the University of Calcutta. He is also an ex-boxer and likes physical activities. He appreciates adventure sports like mountain hiking and still does yoga.

== Award ==
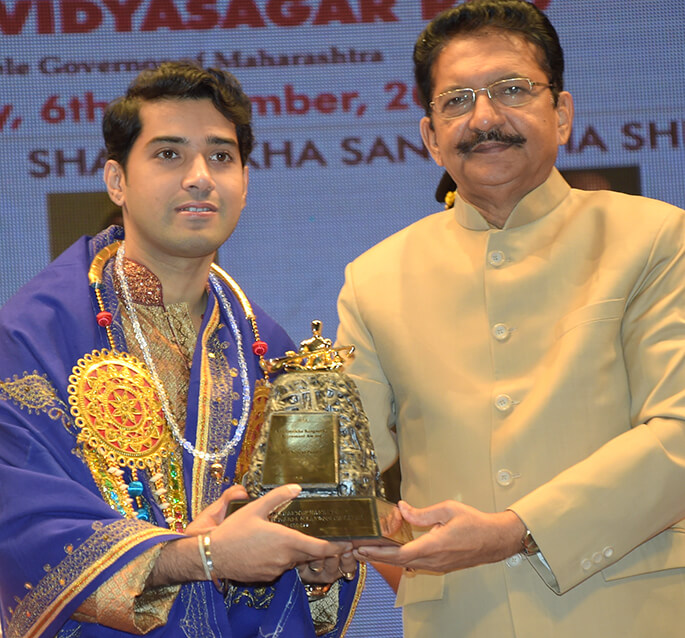
Samrat receiving Award from the state of Maharastra

He received the Sangeet Shiromani Award from the governor of Maharashtra in 2014.

== Discography ==
- 2009: In rare moods with Pandit Jagdish Prasad - double DVD
- 2012: Patiala Prince
- 2016: Live in Goa - DVD
- 2017: Live in Delhi
