= Bade Fateh Ali Khan =

Pakistani classical vocalist (1935–2017)

Ustad Bade Fateh Ali Khan PP
- بڑے فتح علی خان
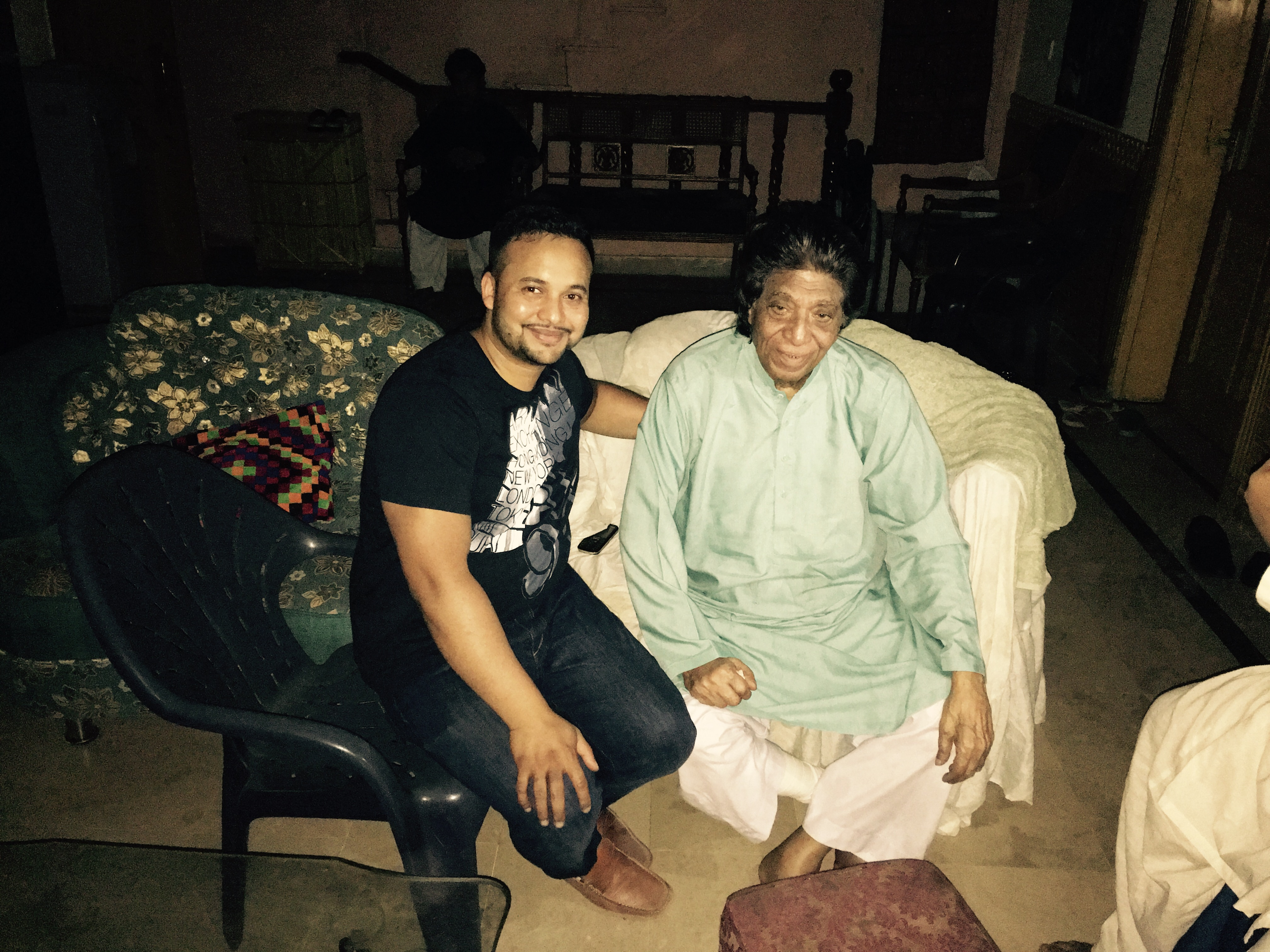
- Born: 20 April 1935; Hoshiarpur, Punjab Province of British India (present-day Punjab, India)
- Died: 4 January 2017 (aged 82); Pakistan Institute of Medical Sciences, Islamabad
- Occupation: Classical vocalist
- Years active: 1945–2016
- Known for: Hindustani classical; Dhrupad; Khyal; Ghazal; Thumri; Tarana
- Children: 2
- Father: Akhtar Hussain
- Relatives: Amanat Ali Khan (brother); Hamid Ali Khan (brother); Asad Amanat Ali Khan (nephew); Shafqat Amanat Ali (nephew)
- Awards: Pride of Performance by the President of Pakistan (1969)

Ustad Bade Fateh Ali Khan PP (Urdu: بڑے فتح علی خان; 20 April 1935 - 4 January 2017) was among the foremost Khyal vocalists in Pakistan, and a leading exponent of the Patiala gharana tradition of music. He was the younger of the legendary singing duo Amanat Ali and Fateh Ali, who enjoyed immense prestige and success across the subcontinent and beyond until the sudden and unexpected death of Ustad Amanat Ali Khan in 1974 at the relatively young age of 52. For his contributions to classical music, Fateh Ali was honoured (along with Amanat Ali) with the highest national literary award of Pakistan — the Pride of Performance — by the President of Pakistan in 1969.

== Early life ==
Fateh Ali was born in Shamchaurasi, Hoshiarpur district in Punjab, British India in 1935. He was named after his grandfather Ali Bakhsh Jarnail's close friend and singing partner, 'Colonel' Fateh Ali Khan. Along with his elder brother Amanat Ali, he was trained by their father, Akhtar Hussain Khan, a distinguished vocalist in the patronage of the princely state of Patiala in colonial British India. Their grandfather had also served as the musician – along with 'Colonel' Fateh Ali Khan – in the same royal court. The Patiala gharana was founded in the mid to late 19th century by his great-grandfather Mian Kallu (also known as Kalu-miya Khan) who had received classical music training from the last Mughal emperor Bahadur Shah Zafar's court musician Mir Qutub Bakhsh Tanrus Khan of Delhi gharana of classical musicians.

== Career ==
Fateh Ali started singing at the age of nine. The duo of Amanat Ali and Fateh Ali had a glorious singing debut in 1945 in Lahore, sponsored by the influential connoisseur, Pandit Jeevanlal Mattoo. In 1949, the duo performed at the prestigious All Bengal Music Conference in Calcutta (now Kolkata), India, which brought them widespread recognition in both India and Pakistan. Thereafter, both brothers toured South Asia extensively and became representatives of the Patiala gharana across the subcontinent.

=== After Partition of India ===
Life changed dramatically for the budding stars after the partition of India in 1947, and the family decided to migrate to Pakistan. Overcoming destitution in their new home, the duo swung back while still in their teens to earn their rightful place amongst the foremost vocalists of the subcontinent. Fateh Ali was dealt a devastating blow with the demise of his brother Amanat Ali in 1974. Fateh Ali is reported to have suffered from severe depression for over a year and a half, following which he joined Radio Pakistan as a supervisor.

The two brothers neatly divided their singing by specialisation. Amanat Ali Khan had a gifted voice and he embellished his singing in broad sweeps by lagao, and blossoming out in the upper register while Fateh Ali engaged in intricacies of the countless behlawas and complex taans, in a much lower and gravelly voice, respectively drawing inspiration from two elders of their gharana, Ustad Bade Ghulam Ali Khan and Ustad Ashiq Ali Khan.

Fateh Ali did not sing for a few years following the death of his brother, but eventually resumed public performances, first with his younger brother Hamid Ali Khan and later with his nephews, Asad Amanat Ali Khan (1955–2007) and Amjad Amanat Ali Khan – both sons of Amanat Ali Khan. The absence of Amanat Ali made Fateh Ali redevelop and realign his singing style. He had to fill the void left by Amanat Ali in the middle of his career, which was not easy to do.

Although also trained in the medieval Dhrupad genre, the uncle-nephew duo restricts its repertoire to the modern mainstream genre, Khayal, and the romanticist genres, Thumris, Dadra, and Ghazal. The pair had, since their alliance, performed widely in Europe, North America, the Middle East, and South Asia, and released several recordings. One highly unusual CD released in 1992 on the ECM label is entitled Ragas and Sagas, which is a collaboration with Norwegian saxophonist Jan Garbarek. Fateh Ali has performed all over the world and has many students internationally. One of his favourite students was Deeyah from Norway. She is originally half Afghan and half Pakistani. She was born in Norway. And now she is in UK and have become an Emmy Award winner film maker.

In the latter half of the 20th century, the Patiala style of Khyal singing has been represented by two streams of the gharana. One stream, gave the music world the Amanat Ali Khan and Bade Fateh Ali Khan duo. The other stream, through its training of Patiala-Kasur gharana vocalists, produced Bade Ghulam Ali Khan (1903–1968), his brother Barkat Ali Khan (1907–1963), and the former's son, Munawar Ali Khan (1933–1989). With the stylistic distinctiveness and continuity of Khayal gharanas having fallen prey to socio-cultural changes on both sides of the India-Pakistan border, Bade Fateh Ali Khan is hailed as the last of the thoroughbred Patiala Gharana vocalists.

=== Notable students ===
On Bade Fateh Ali Khan's death, his younger brother Hamid Ali Khan described him as a father figure for their entire family and also his teacher who taught him everything he knows about classical music.

His disciple, Ahmad Wali of Afghanistan, had shown such talent at a young age that Ustad bestowed upon Ahmad Wali his own name thus calling him Ahmad Wali Fateh Ali Khan. Ahmad Wali Fateh Ali Khan was born in 1987 and was first taught by Syed Muhibullah Hashimi and now Wali Fateh Ali Khan is a popular vocalist in Afghanistan. The famous nohakhawan Haider Rizvi Alhussaini was also a student of the great Bade Fateh Ali Khan. In 2016, he teaches classical music classes at Pakistan National Council of Arts (PNCA) in Islamabad as he has gotten older.

Ustad Fateh Ali Khan's signature vocal style has influenced many singers around the world, including classical vocal prodigy, Shyam Panchmatia, about whom the Ustad said, "we are fortunate that such young talent exists around the world; the future of our music is safe in their hands." Shyam's exposition of Raag Megh from the Patiala Gharana has been featured on the BBC after being performed internationally.

Other notable students include Amanat Ali Khan's son, Shafqat Amanat Ali, an accomplished classical, pop, and playback singer who has brought attention to several Patiala gharana compositions penned by Fateh Ali and Amanat Ali by arranging the scores in more contemporary styles.

== Death ==
Khan developed lung disease in late 2016 and was admitted to PIMS Hospital in Islamabad where he died on 4 January 2017 at the age of 82. His funeral prayers were held in Lahore, Pakistan. In March 2017, a tribute event was organised at the Arts Council of Pakistan, Karachi in his honour and remembrance. He was buried at Mominpura Graveyard in Lahore where his brother and singing partner Amanat Ali Khan and nephew Asad Amanat Ali Khan are also buried.

== Awards and recognition ==
- Pride of Performance Award in 1969 by the President of Pakistan (honoured together with Amanat Ali Khan).
- Tamgha-e-Imtiaz (Medal of Distinction) by the Government of Pakistan.
