= Mazhar Khan =

Mazhar Khan may refer to:

- Mazhar Khan (actor, born 1905) (1905–1950), Indian actor, producer and director
- Mazhar Khan (actor, born 1955) (1955–1998), Indian actor, producer and director
- Mazhar Khan (cricketer) (born 1964), Pakistani cricketer
- Mazhar Khan, Pakistani diplomat implicated in the financing of the terrorist organization Jamaat-ul-Mujahideen Bangladesh in 2015

== See also ==
- Mazhar Ali Khan (disambiguation)
