= Jagdish Prasad =

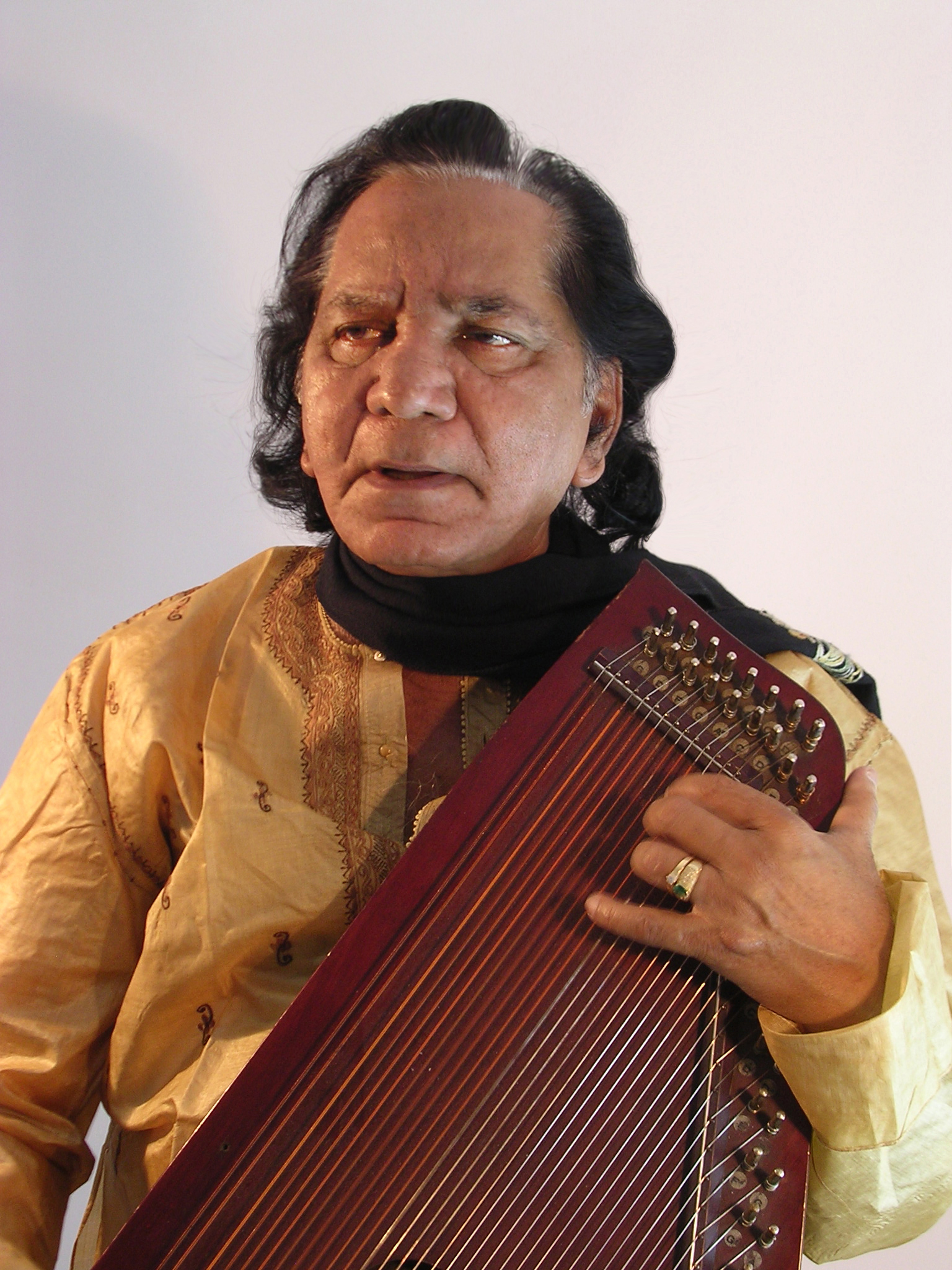

Background information
- Born: 1937; Bilaspur, Chhattisgarh, India
- Died: July 2011 (aged 73–74) Kolkata, West Bengal, India
- Genres: Hindustani classical music
- Occupation: Singer
- Years active: 1938–2011

Jagdish Prasad (1937 - 18 July 2011) was a Calcutta-based Indian classical vocalist of the Patiala gharana.

== Early life and training ==
He received his initial training from his father Badri Prasad. Badri prasad ji was the court musician of the former principality of Raigarh, situated in the modern state of Chhattisgarh. Later Jagdish ji became a student of Bade Ghulam Ali Khan.

== Career ==
He was associated with the ITC Sangeet Research Academy. He joined ITC-SRA in 1977 as a musician-scholar. Later on he became a lecturer at the Khairagarh University in Madhya Pradesh. He was a Top grade All India Radio radio artist.

He has performed in all the major conferences held all over the country and has also toured abroad in countries like US, Canada, UK and several parts of Europe.

He was a winner of the civilian honour Padma Shri (1991).

== Legacy ==
His legacy is being carried on by his son Samrat Pandit who launched his solo career in 2001.

== Recordings ==
- Dawning Dewdrops (2011) (Label: Questz World): Ragas: Gurjari Todi, Bhatiyar & Kafi Thumri
- Shraddhanjali (2 CDs) (2011) (Label: Saregama India): Ragas: Bageshri, Gujri Todi, Bhairavi Thumri, Vacahspati, Desh Thumri, Pahadi Thumri
