= Pandit Iman Das =

Indian musician

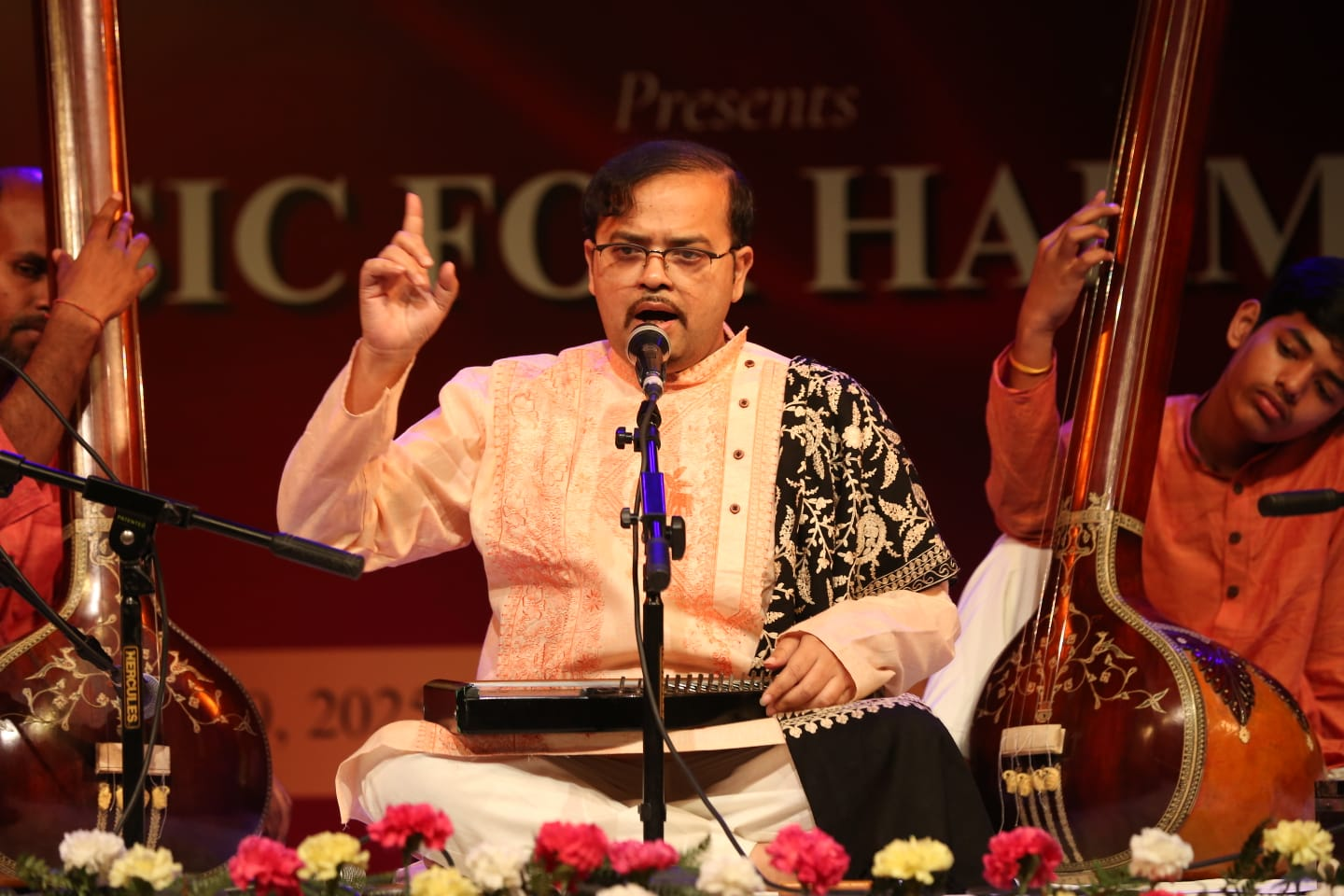
- Pandit Iman Das performing live
- Born: September 9, 1982 (age 43); India
- Occupations: Hindustani classical vocalist, composer
- Years active: 2000–present
- Known for: Patiala gharana exponent; founder of Omkar Music Academy
- Awards: Basavaraj Rajguru Memorial Yuva Kalakar Award (2023); Bhasha-e-Kala Samman (2024)

Pandit Iman Das (born September 9, 1982) is an Indian Hindustani classical vocalist and composer based in Bengaluru, Karnataka. He is known for his association with the Patiala gharana and for initiatives that blend traditional Indian classical music with contemporary and global influences.

== Early life and training ==
Das was born into a musical family and trained under many noted musicians, including Pandit Ajoy Chakraborty, Pandit Shantanu Bhattacharyya, and Pandit Kalyan Basu, a disciple of Ustad Bade Ghulam Ali Khan. He also studied Rabindra Sangeet under Enakshi Chattopadhyay and received guidance from sitar maestro Pandit Subroto Roychowdhury.

== Career ==
Das began performing publicly in his teens and has since presented concerts across India and abroad, including in the United Kingdom, Germany, Austria, Belgium, France, Switzerland, Australia and the United Arab Emirates. He is an A‑grade artist of All India Radio and Doordarshan.

In addition to classical performances, Das leads a fusion ensemble called Iman Das’s Shringar and has composed music for theatre and collaborative projects. He is the founder of Omkar Music Academy in Bengaluru and Kolkata, which trains students in Hindustani classical music and organises the annual Omkar Music Festival.

== Projects and compositions ==
In 2022, Das composed and produced Urche Bangla, a concept song featuring 25 members of the Bengali community in Bengaluru. He created the raga Swarnadesi, which was performed by visually impaired musicians at the closing ceremony of the 2024 Summer Paralympics in Paris.

Das has also worked in theatre, composing music for the multilingual production Amrito-Sandhane, and launched the Morning Mantra programme that combines early‑morning ragas with yoga practice.

Iman Das also contributed additional vocals to two tracks of Qala (soundtrack).

== Discography ==
Year	Song
2020	Ananda Karo
2021	Jab Tak Rahe Saans
2022	Maa Meera
2022	Bhig Jau Mae Piya
2024	Prem Ki Maare Katar
2025	Urche Bangla

== Awards and recognition ==
- Basavaraj Rajguru Memorial Yuva Kalakar Award (Government of Karnataka, 2023)
- Selected as one of the “Top Ten Bengalis of Bangalore” in 2020
- Bhasha‑e‑Kala Samman (2024) for the book One Nation, One Music: Ek Bharat, Ek Sangeet
- Recognised by WNYR New York radio among the “World’s Top Emerging Artists” for the Sanskrit composition Maa Meera
