= Johar Ali Khan =

Musician from India

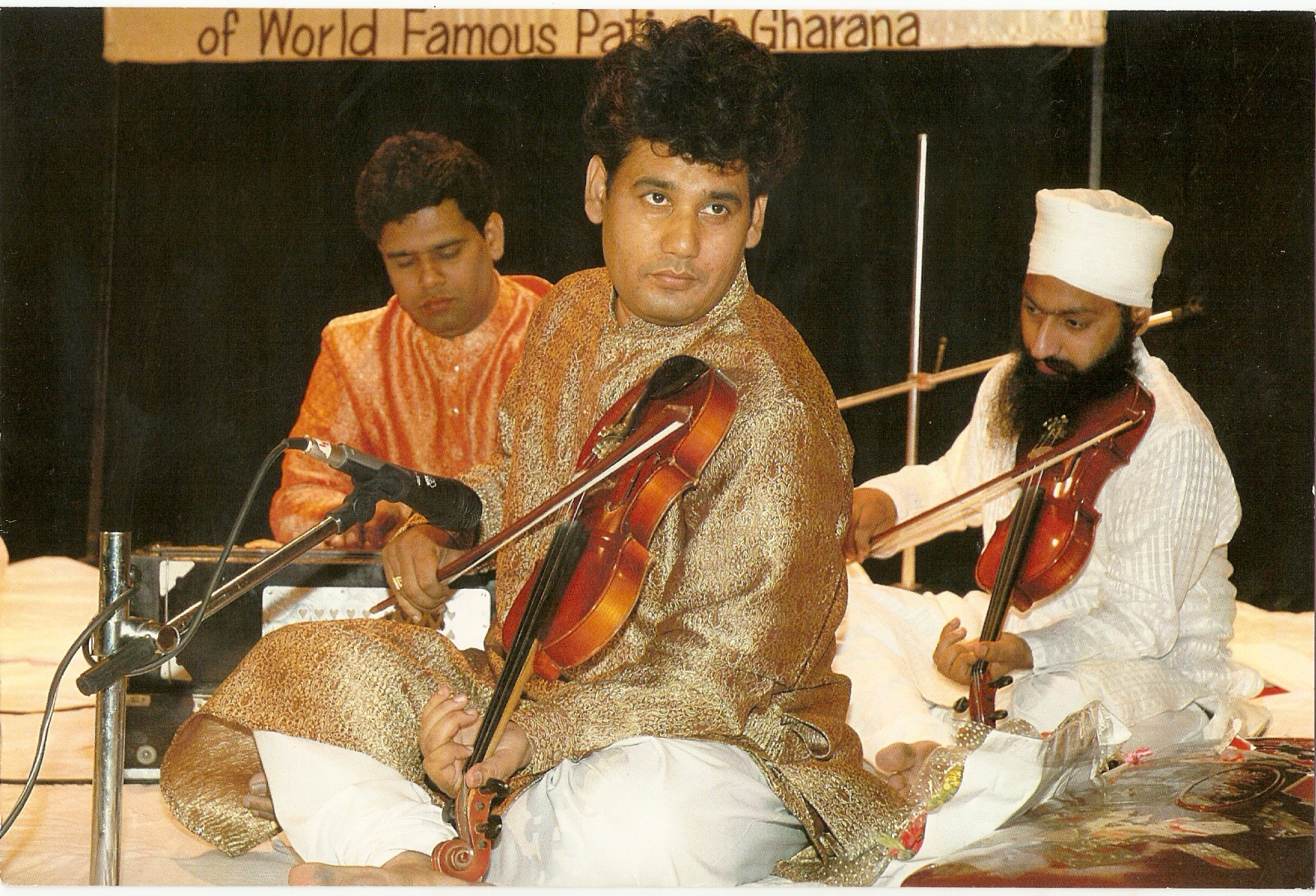
- Saaz Aur Awaaz Performance, New Delhi, 27 May 2007
- Occupations: Conductor, pedagogue, violinist, writer
- Years active: 1980 – present
- Known for: violin player - Suns of Arqa
- Notable credit: Hindustani classical music

Johar Ali Khan (born 22 December 1967) is an Indian classical violinist. He is the son and disciple of Gohar Ali Khan of Rampur, and belongs to the Patiala Gharana of Rampur. His grandfather was Ali Baksh Jarnail, the founder of Patiala Gharana.

== Career ==
Johar Ali Khan represented India at the 60th anniversary of UNESCO in Paris, where he had composed music for melody of dialogue among Civilizations Association.

He also represented India at the South Asian Association for Regional Cooperation Summit in Bangladesh. He has performed or taught, as part of Indian government programs or through private organisations, in Nepal, Bangladesh, England, Syria, Fiji, Djibouti, Addis Ababa, the Netherlands, Estonia, Spain, Germany, Switzerland, Austria, Hungary, Czech Republic, France, Belgium, Finland, Sharjah, Dubai, several African countries, and Indonesia. Johar Ali Khan has composed music for the South Pacific Games on behalf of Indian Council for Cultural Relations (ICCR), New Delhi.

Johar Ali Khan has performed for several government and non-government organizations. He was a member of the advisory committee and general assembly of the ICCR (2003–2019). He has created his own band, Sargam, with members from traditional musical families and Gharanas.

== Discography ==
- Raag Lalit by VPRO Records
- Suns of Arqa – Cosmic Jugalbandi (1999)
- Suns of Arqa – Cosmic Jugalbandi (2000)
- Suns of Arqa – Suns of Arqa Meet The Gayan Uttejak Orchestra
- Suns of Arqa – Live With Prince Far-I (1999)
- [Suns of Arqa – Solar Activity 1979–2001
- Tribal Futures: The Way Ahead
- Amadou & Mariam – Sou Ni Tilé (1999)
- Faya Dub (2001)
- The Pyramid (VCD)

== Films ==
- Blueberry (2004) – A French movie
