= Barkat Sidhu =

- Born: 18 September 1946
- Origin: Kaniya village near Shahkot, Jalandhar, Punjab, India
- Died: 17 August 2014 (aged 67) Ludhiana
- Occupation: Singer

Barkat Sidhu (18 September 1946 – 17 August 2014) was a Sufi singer from Moga district, Punjab, India, and a fine exponent of the Patiala Gharana. Barkat was born at Kaniya village near Shahkot in Jalandhar district in 1946. In his early days, he got his musical training from his maternal uncle Niranjan Das (father of Puran Shahkoti). He then became disciple of Pandit Kesar Chand Narang and learnt Indian classical music.

== Discography ==
- Deedar Mahi Da
- Har Surat Vich Tu
- Rom Rom Vich Tu
- The best of Barkat Sidhu

=== Gabu Schalabi ===
- Alif Allah
- Dekho Ni Ki Kar Gaya Mahi
- Uth Gaye Gawandon Yaar- the year of the supernatural

== Death ==
Barkat Sidhu died of cancer in a hospital in Ludhiana on 17 August 2014. Punjab Chief Minister Parkash Singh Badal had directed the authorities of the private hospital in Ludhiana, where Barkat was admitted, to provide him treatment at free of cost. He died in the presence of his friends and family.
