= Mazhar Ali Khan =

Mazhar Ali Khan may refer to:

- Mazhar Ali Khan (journalist), Pakistan journalist and intellectual
- Mazhar Ali Khan (painter), 19th century painter from Delhi
- Mazhar Ali Khan (singer), Hindustani classical vocalist

== See also ==
- Mazhar Khan (disambiguation)
