= Jawaad Ali Khan =

Classical music vocalist

Jawaad Ali Khan is a Hindustani classical music vocalist of the Kasur Patiala Gharana.

He was trained in music by his father, Karamat Ali Khan, the son of Ustad Bade Ghulam Ali Khan, and from his uncle Ustad Munawar Ali Khan.

Khan started his musical career in the early 1980s. He is also a vocalist of All India Radio. He has performed at many music conferences of India with his elder brother Mazhar Ali Khan.
