= Sanjukta Ghosh =

Indian singer

Sanjukta Ghosh is an Indian vocalist in Hindustani classical music from the Patiala Gharana.

== Early life ==
Initially, she was under the guidance of Prasun Banerjee and later, for almost two decades, from Munawar Ali Khan.

== Career ==
She performed for most of the top Indian conferences, some of them being Tansen Sangeet Sammelan, Sadarang Music Conference, and the Haridas Sangeet Sammelan.

She joined the Ali Akbar College of Music at San Francisco, California in 1968. She worked with many artists including Pandit Ravi Shankar, who invited her to sing on his Bangladesh benefit EP, Joi Bangla.

== Personal life ==
She is married to tabla player Shankar Ghosh. Her son is Bickram Ghosh, percussionist.
