= Dilshad Khan =

Indian singer (1941-2026)

Ustad Dilshad Khan
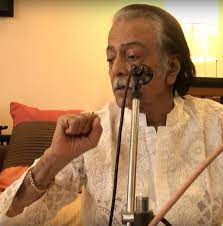
- Khan in 2018

Background information
- Born: Arabinda Dasgupta; 7 August 1941
- Origin: Kolkata, India
- Died: November 8, 2026 (aged 85) Mumbai
- Genres: Khyal, Thumri
- Occupation: Hindustani classical music
- Instrument: Vocal
- Years active: 1959–2026
- Spouse: Parveen Sultana
- Relative: Buddhadev Das Gupta

Dilshad Khan (born Arabinda Dasgupta) (7 August 1941 - 8 November 2026) was a Hindustani classical singer and the husband of Parween Sultana. Ustaad Dilshad was the younger brother of sarod musician Buddhadev Das Gupta.

== Early life and background ==
Khan was born in Kolkata. He was the younger brother of sarod musician Buddhadev Das Gupta. He attended St. Xavier's Collegiate School, Kolkata, where future music composer R. D. Burman was his classmate.

He started learning tabla at the age of four, but later took up singing under the guidance of N.C. Chakravorty, Hidan Banarjee and Gyan Prakash Ghosh. He was inspired by Bade Ghulam Ali Khan. After moving permanently to Mumbai, Khan became a disciple of Kirana Gharana vocalists Ustad Faiyyaz Ahmed Khan and Ustad Niaz Ahmed Khan.

== Personal life ==
Khan was married to classical vocalist, Begum Parveen Sultana. They have a daughter; Shadaab Sultana Khan.
