= Som Dutt Battu =

Indian Classical Singer

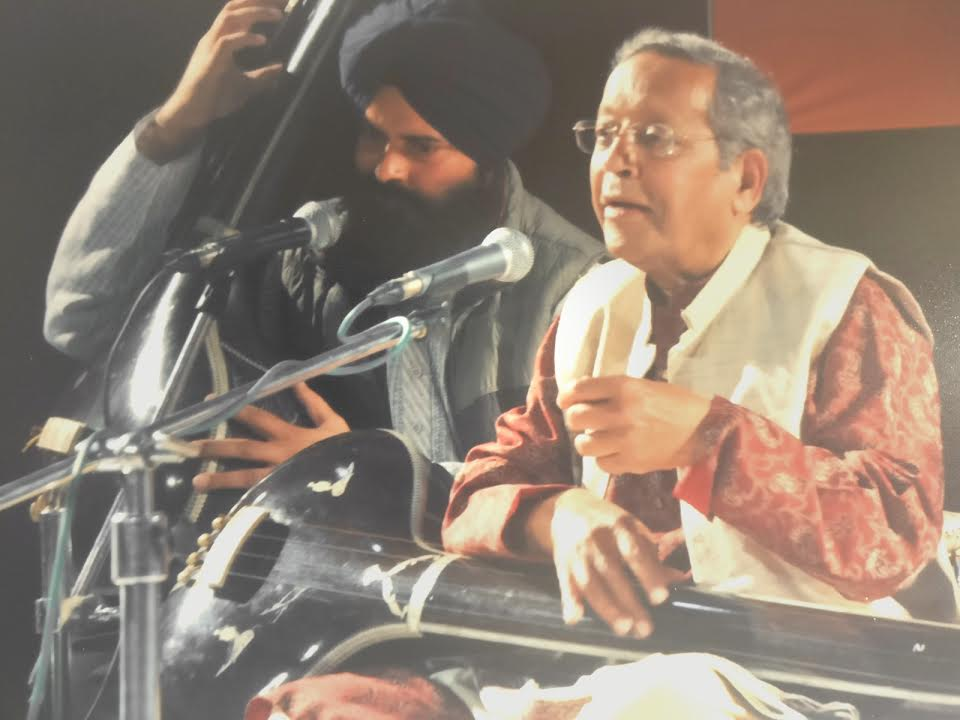

Professor Music Department Himachal Pradesh University

Personal details
- Occupation: Classical Singer, Musicologist

Som Dutt Battu (born 5 July 1938) is a Shimla-based Hindustani classical vocalist of the Patiala Gharana. He was a winner of the civilian honour of Himachal Gaurav. He is also a member of Empanelment Committee for Hindustani Music at Indian Council for Cultural Relations New Delhi.

== Early life and background ==
Born in a family of musicians, Som Dutt Battu was initiated into Hindustani vocal music by his father Ram Lal Battu, a follower of the Sham Chaurasia gharana. He received training in music from Kunj Lal Sharma, a disciple of Vishnu Digambar Paluskar. He also learned the techniques of the gayaki (singing style) of Patiala gharana from Kundan Lal Sharma, a noted disciple of Ashique Ali Khan.

== Writer ==
Indian Institute of Advanced Studies published ‘MAN AND MUSIC IN INDIA’ in the year 1992; in this work, some research papers including Battu's were published.

== Awards ==
1. Life Time Achievement and Param Sabhayachar Samman Award by Punjabi Academy New Delhi, Government of Delhi.
2. Punjab Sangeet Rattan Award.
3. Sangeet Natak Akademi Award
4. Padma Shri Award

5.Himachal Gaurav Award 2017
