= Sabrang Utsav =

- Genre: Indian classical
- Locations: Delhi, India
- Years active: 1968-present
- Founders: Malti Gilani

Sabrang Utsav is a single-day Indian classical music festival held in memory of the singer Bade Ghulam Ali Khan, and was started by his disciple Malti Gilani. The festival has been held every year since 1968 (the year of Khan's death in Hyderabad, India). It takes place in the winter months in Delhi and typically has two recitals.
