= Sou Ni Tilé =

Studio album by Amadou & Mariam
- Released: April 13, 1999
- Recorded: August 1997
- Length: 70:48
- Label: Tinder; PolyGram
- Producer: Amadou Bagayoko; Marc Antoine Moreau

Amadou & Mariam chronology
Se Te Djon Ye (1999)	Sou Ni Tilé (1999)	Tje Ni Mousso (2000)

Sou Ni Tilé is an album by Malian duo Amadou & Mariam, released in 1999. It was their first album to be released internationally. The album reached No. 61 on the French albums chart. "Je Pense à Toi" reached No. 43 on the French singles chart.

In a review for Allmusic, Brian Beatty gave the album a rating of four stars out of five and described it as "mature, intelligent pop music".

== Track listing ==
1. "Je Pense à Toi" (I Think of You) – 5:16
2. "Combattants" (Warriors) – 4:26
3. "Mouna" (I Wonder Why?) – 4:44
4. "Pauvre Type" (Poor Guy) – 4:35
5. "Dogons" – 4:04
6. "Baara" (Work) – 4:33
7. "Dounia" (The World) – 3:17
8. "A Radio Mogo" – 4:49
9. "Djandjola" (Adventure) – 4:06
10. "On Se Donne La Main" (Hand in Hand) – 4:34
11. "Mon Amour, Ma Chérie" (My Love, My Darling) – 5:23
12. "A Chacun Son Problème" – 4:40
13. "Teree La Sebin" (Evil Eye) – 5:33
14. "Toubala Kono" (Lonely Bird) – 5:22
15. "C'est La Vie" (That's Life) – 5:26

== Personnel ==
Music

- Walde Baba Sissoko – tama
- Amadou Bagayoko – composer, guitar, vocals
- Shihab M'Ghezzi Bekhoughe – bass
- Sameh Catalan – violin
- Mariam Doumbia – vocals
- Sanata Doumbia – background vocals
- Barbara Teuntor Garcia – trumpet
- Alain Hatot – flute, transverse flute
- Idwar Iskandar – Arabian flute, flute, ney
- Johar Ali Khan –violin
- Loïc Landois –harmonica
- Matu – Fender Rhodes, Hammond organ
- Alberto Rodriguez – arranger, trombone
- Stephane San Juan – drums, percussion
- Babbaro Teunter Garcia – trumpet
- Awa Timbo – vocals, background vocals
- Andrés Viáfara – arranger, trombone

Production

- Jean-Philippe Allard – executive producer
- Amadou Bagayoko – producer
- Laurent Jaïs – engineer, mixing
- Sherif Megahed – assistant engineer, mixing assistant
- Marc Antoine Moreau – producer
- Daniel Richard – executive producer

Design

- Marie Laure Dagnaux – photography
- Thomas Delepière – photography
- Frederic Fauchet – liner notes, lyric translation
- Philippe Savoir – design, visuals
