= Qala (soundtrack) =

Soundtrack album by Amit Trivedi and Sagar Desai
- Released: 11 November 2022
- Recorded: 2021–2022
- Genre: Feature film soundtrack
- Length: 25:24
- Language: Hindi
- Label: Sony Music India
- Producer: Amit Trivedi

Amit Trivedi chronology
Thai Massage (2022)	Qala (2022)	Mrs Chatterjee Vs Norway (2023)

Sagar Desai chronology
Tora's Husband (2022)	Qala (2022)	Sukhee (2022)

Qala is the official soundtrack to the 2022 Indian psychological drama of the same name, directed by Anvita Dutt, and produced by Clean Slate Filmz. The soundtrack was composed by Amit Trivedi, with lyrics by Amitabh Bhattacharya, Varun Grover, Swanand Kirkire and Kausar Munir. The drama's chronology was by Sagar Desai. The album is known for its fusion of classical Indian music and modern cinematic elements.

== Background ==
Qala is set in the 1940s, during the early days of the Hindi film industry. Trivedi aimed to create melodies that felt authentic to vintage Hindi musical films while appealing to contemporary listeners. He studied the works of C. Ramchandra, S. D. Burman, and Naushad to inform his compositions, focusing on Dutt's "mother-daughter" story, which he felt had a "real haunting quality."

In an interview with Swati Chopra of The Quint, when asked about the soundtrack's inspiration from Guru Dutt's filmography, Dutt stated, "We never specifically talked about any particular director or composer while working on the songs, because we didn't want anybody to be influenced. We only spoke about the character and the story."

The songs were composed in three days during a Goa staycation with Dutt and lyricist Swanand Kirkire. The script narration took one day, and the scoring took two. He also mentioned that he almost abandoned the project before finishing it.

To suit the early 1940s setting, the soundtrack avoided electronic instruments, opting for classical Indian instruments. These included the ⁣⁣tabla⁣⁣, ⁣⁣dholak⁣⁣, ⁣⁣rebab⁣⁣, ⁣⁣sitar⁣⁣, and ⁣⁣accordion⁣⁣. Sireesha Bhagavatula sang the songs, and Mallya described this experience as a "golden opportunity" and expressed gratitude to Amit Trivedi for trusting her. Bengaluru-based musician Pandit Iman Das contributed additional vocals to two tracks.

== Songs ==
The album consists of eight tracks, each designed to reflect the film's period setting and emotional depth:

1. "Ghode Pe Sawar" – Vocals by Sireesha Bhagavatula
2. "Shauq" – Vocals by Swanand Kirkire, Sireesha Bhagavatula, and Shahid Mallya
3. "Rubaiyaan" – Vocals by Shahid Mallya and Sireesha Bhagavatula
4. "Nirbhau Nirvair" – Vocals by Shahid Mallya
5. "Phero Na Najariya" – Vocals by Sireesha Bhagavatula
6. "Udh Jaayega" – Vocals by Swanand Kirkire
7. "Kahani Kya Hai" – Vocals by Amit Trivedi and Rupali Moghe
8. "Bikta Hai Sach Yahan" – Vocals by Romy

__________________________________________________________________________

Dutt and Trivedi drew inspiration for the songs from the film's narrative. The ballad "Shauq" depicts the relationship between Qala's mother and a record executive. Dutt visualized the scene with the characters in a boat at night, with the Howrah Bridge visible.

"Phero Na Najariya" is described as a song of redemption for Qala, and "Nirbhau Nirvair" portrays the competition between Qala and Jagan. "Udh Jayega" features imagery of death and freedom, playing after Jagan's death.

Deepansh Duggal of First-post interpreted "Ghode Pe Sawaar" as a critique of stalking in Hindi songs, depicting Qala's rebellion. Trivedi incorporated an accordion melody reminiscent of O. P. Nayyar's signature style to evoke nostalgia. Anushka Sharma, the film's producer, made a brief cameo in the music video for "Ghode Pe Sawar".

"Rubaiyaan" was recorded but not included in the final film.

== Track listing ==
No.	Title	Lyrics	Music	Singer(s)	Length
1.	"Ghode Pe Sawaar"	Amitabh Bhattacharya	Amit Trivedi	Sireesha Bhagavatula	3:14
2.	"Rubaaiyaan"	Swanand Kirkire	Amit Trivedi	Shahid Mallya, Sireesha Bhagavatula	4:13
3.	"Shauq"	Varun Grover	Amit Trivedi	Swanand Kirkire, Shahid Mallya, Sireesha Bhagavatula	3:39
4.	"Phero Na Najariya"	Kausar Munir	Amit Trivedi	Sireesha Bhagavatula	4:00
5.	"Nirbhau Nirvair"	Sant Kabir, Anvitaa Dutt	Amit Trivedi	Shahid Mallya	5:08
6.	"Udh Jaayega"	Sant Kabir	Sagar Desai	Shahid Mallya	4:37
Total length:					24:57

== Reception ==
Qala received positive reception. Deepansh Duggal noted that "the music is a character. There are times when it acts like an oracle prophesying future events." Vipin Nair stated that "Anvita Dutt makes up for the lack of songs in her [previously released] debut movie with style!".

Manjeet Singh of Leisure Byte called the music "the core element of the film". Bhavya Sadhwani of India Times described the songs as "original and authentic". Anish Mohanty of Planet Bollywood wrote that "Qala serves as a reminder of how Amit Trivedi is a gifted composer." Roktim Rajpal of India Today offered a more mixed review, stating that "Amit Trivedi tunes prove to be a mixed bag."

The soundtrack was praised by some listeners for its "transcendental music and lyrics". "Ghodey Pe Sawaar" gained popularity, leading to cover versions by fans and celebrities, including Madhuri Dixit. A fan-made male version by Jainam Barot received mixed reactions.

== Accolades ==
Award	Category	Recipients	Result	Ref.
8th FOI Online Awards	Best Music Direction -Songs	Amit Trivedi & Sagar Desai	Won	
8th FOI Online Awards	Best Original Song	Amit Trivedi, Swanand Kirkire & Shahid Mallya for "Rubaaiyaan"	Won	
8th FOI Online Awards	Best Playback Singer - Male	Shahid Mallya for "Rubaaiyaan"	Won	
8th FOI Online Awards	Best Playback Singer - Male	Swanand Kirkire & Shahid Mallya for "Shauq"	Nominated	
8th FOI Online Awards	Best Playback Singer - Female	Sireesha Bhagavatula for "Ghodey Pe Sawar"	Nominated	
8th FOI Online Awards	Best Playback Singer - Female	Sireesha Bhagavatula for "Phero Na Najariya"	Won	
8th FOI Online Awards	Best Lyricist	Amitabh Bhattacharya for"Ghodey Pe Sawar"	Nominated	
8th FOI Online Awards	Best Lyricist	Swanand Kirkire for "Rubaaiyaan"	Won	
8th FOI Online Awards	Best Lyricist	Varun Grover for "Shauq"	Nominated	
17th RMIM Puraskaar	Song Of The Year	Amit Trivedi, Varun Grover, Shahid Mallya, Sireesha Bhagavatula & Swanand Kirkire for "Shauq"	Won	
17th RMIM Puraskaar	Lyricist Of The Year	Amitabh Bhattacharya for Ghodey Pe Sawar"	Won	
17th RMIM Puraskaar	Best Composed and Arranged Song	Amit Trivedi for "Shauq"	Won	
17th RMIM Puraskaar	Best Composed and Arranged Song	Amit Trivedi for "Ghodey Pe Sawar"	Nominated	
17th RMIM Puraskaar	Best Composed and Arranged Song	Amit Trivedi for "Rubaaiyaan"	Nominated	
17th RMIM Puraskaar	Best Composed and Arranged Song	Amit Trivedi for "Phero Na Najariya"	Nominated	
17th RMIM Puraskaar	Best Written Song	Varun Grover for "Shauq"	Won	
17th RMIM Puraskaar	Best Written Song	Swanand Kirkire for "Rubaaiyaan"	Nominated	
17th RMIM Puraskaar	Best Written Song	Amitabh Bhattacharya for "Ghodey Pe Sawar"	Nominated	
17th RMIM Puraskaar	Best Sung Song (Solo)	Shahid Mallya for "Rubaaiyaan"	Won	
17th RMIM Puraskaar	Best Sung Song (Solo)	Sireesha Bhagavatula for"Ghodey Pe Sawar"	Nominated	
17th RMIM Puraskaar	Best Sung Song (Duet or Group)	Shahid Mallya, Sireesha Bhagavatula & Swanand Kirkire for "Shauq"	Won	
Showsha Reel Awards	Best Music (Film)	Amit Trivedi	Won	
Showsha Reel Awards	Best Playback Singer - Male	Shahid Mallya for "Rubaaiyaan", "Shauq" & "Nirbhau Nirvair"	Won	
Showsha Reel Awards	Best Playback Singer - Female	Sireesha Bhagavatula for"Ghodey Pe Sawar" & "Phero Na Najariya"	Nominated	
15th Mirchi Music Awards	Album Of The Year	Whole Musical Team	Nominated	
15th Mirchi Music Awards	Song Of The Year	Amit Trivedi, Amitabh Bhattacharya, Sireesha Bhagavatula for "Ghodey Pe Sawar"	Nominated	
15th Mirchi Music Awards	Song Of The Year	Amit Trivedi, Varun Grover, Shahid Mallya, Sireesha Bhagavatula & Swanand Kirkire for "Shauq"	Nominated	
15th Mirchi Music Awards	Female Vocalist Of The Year	Sireesha Bhagavatula for "Phero Na Najariya"	Nominated	
15th Mirchi Music Awards	Music Composer Of The Year	Amit Trivedi for "Ghodey Pe Sawar"	Nominated	
15th Mirchi Music Awards	Music Composer Of The Year	Amit Trivedi for "Shauq"	Nominated	
15th Mirchi Music Awards	Lyricist Of The Year	Amitabh Bhattacharya for "Ghodey Pe Sawar"	Nominated	
15th Mirchi Music Awards	Lyricist Of The Year	Kausar Munir for "Phero Na Najariya"	Nominated	
15th Mirchi Music Awards	Upcoming Female Vocalist Of The Year	Sireesha Bhagavatula for "Ghodey Pe Sawar"	Won	
15th Mirchi Music Awards	Upcoming Female Vocalist Of The Year	Sireesha Bhagavatula for"Phero Na Najariya"	Nominated	
15th Mirchi Music Awards	Listener's Choice - Album Of The Year	Whole Team	Cancelled	
