= Mazhar Ali Khan (singer) =

Classical music vocalist

Ustad Mazhar Ali Khan

Background information
- Born: 16 November 1958; Mumbai, India
- Died: 6 September 2021 (aged 62) New Delhi, India
- Genres: Hindustani classical music
- Occupation: vocalist
- Instrument: Vocals
- Labels: Weston Company of India
- Awards: The Best Classic Vocalist of Punjab (1995); The Best Classic Performer (2005)

Ustad Mazhar Ali Khan (16 November 1958 – 6 September 2021) was a Hindustani classical music vocalist of the Kasur Patiala Gharana. He received various accolades from the Government of India, including the title of the best classical vocalist of Punjab (1995) and the best classic performers (2005). Alongside his younger brother, Ustad Jawaad Ali Khan, he was a top-grade artist at Doordarshan and All India Radio. They have represented India internationally through the Indian Council for Cultural Relations (ICCR), performing in numerous countries across Europe, North America, Russia, Germany, and Pakistan, and have appeared at major festivals and cultural events, including Sabrang Utsav, in India and abroad. The duo founded the Bade Ghulam Ali Khan Music Foundation of India to promote Indian classical music and cultural heritage.

== Early life and family ==
Mazhar Ali Khan was born on 16 November 1958 in New Delhi into the Kasur–Patiala gharana.

He was the son of Karamat Ali Khan, a grandson of Ustad Bade Ghulam Ali Khan, and the elder brother of Jawaad Ali Khan.

The initial musical guidance and environment for Khan came from their grandfather Bade Ghulam Ali Khan, their granduncle Barkat Ali Khan, and their father Karamat Ali Khan, all of whom played a formative role in nurturing their interest in Hindustani classical music.

Later he received his formal training under his uncle and guru, Munawar Ali Khan, the second son of Bade Ghulam Ali Khan. He was trained in the Chamukhia style of the Patiala gharana.

== Style ==
He was noted for his command over complex tān patterns, precise control of swar and laya, and a powerful, robust vocal approach characteristic of the Patiala–Kasur gharana tradition.

== Career ==
Khan along with his brother was top grade artist at Doordarshan and the All India Radio. Their audio recording "Yād-e-Sabrang" featuring thumris and dadras dedicated to Bade Ghulam Ali Khan, was released by the Weston Company of India. The recording has received notable demand among listeners in India, Pakistan, and Canada.

He had performed along with his brother Jawaad Ali Khan at various festivals and cultural events including the Sabrang Utsav.

They represented India through the Indian Council for Cultural Relations in numerous countries, including Canada, Europe, Germany, Russia, Pakistan, and many more countries worldwide.

== Recorded works ==
- "Peelu" – featuring Ustad Jawaad Ali Khan
- "Hameer" – featuring Ustad Jawaad Ali Khan
- "Des" – featuring Ustad Jawaad Ali Khan
- "Yād-e-Sabrang" – featuring Ustad Jawaad Ali Khan
- "Shahana" – featuring Ustad Jawaad Ali Khan
- "Durga" – featuring Ustad Jawaad Ali Khan

== Philanthropy ==
Ustad Mazhar Ali Khan and Ustad Jawaad Ali Khan founded the Bade Ghulam Ali Khan Music Foundation of India with the objective of promoting Indian classical music and cultural heritage, as well as supporting humanitarian initiatives.

== Awards ==
- In 1995, Awarded for the best classic vocalist of Punjab, by Government of Punjab, India
- In 2005, Awarded as the best classic performers, by Delhi Government
- Awarded by Bade Ghulam Ali khan Music Academy of Toronto (Canada)
- Lahore (Pakistan) Awarded for the best classic performer.
