= Parween Sultana =

Indian Hindustani classical singer (Born: 1950)

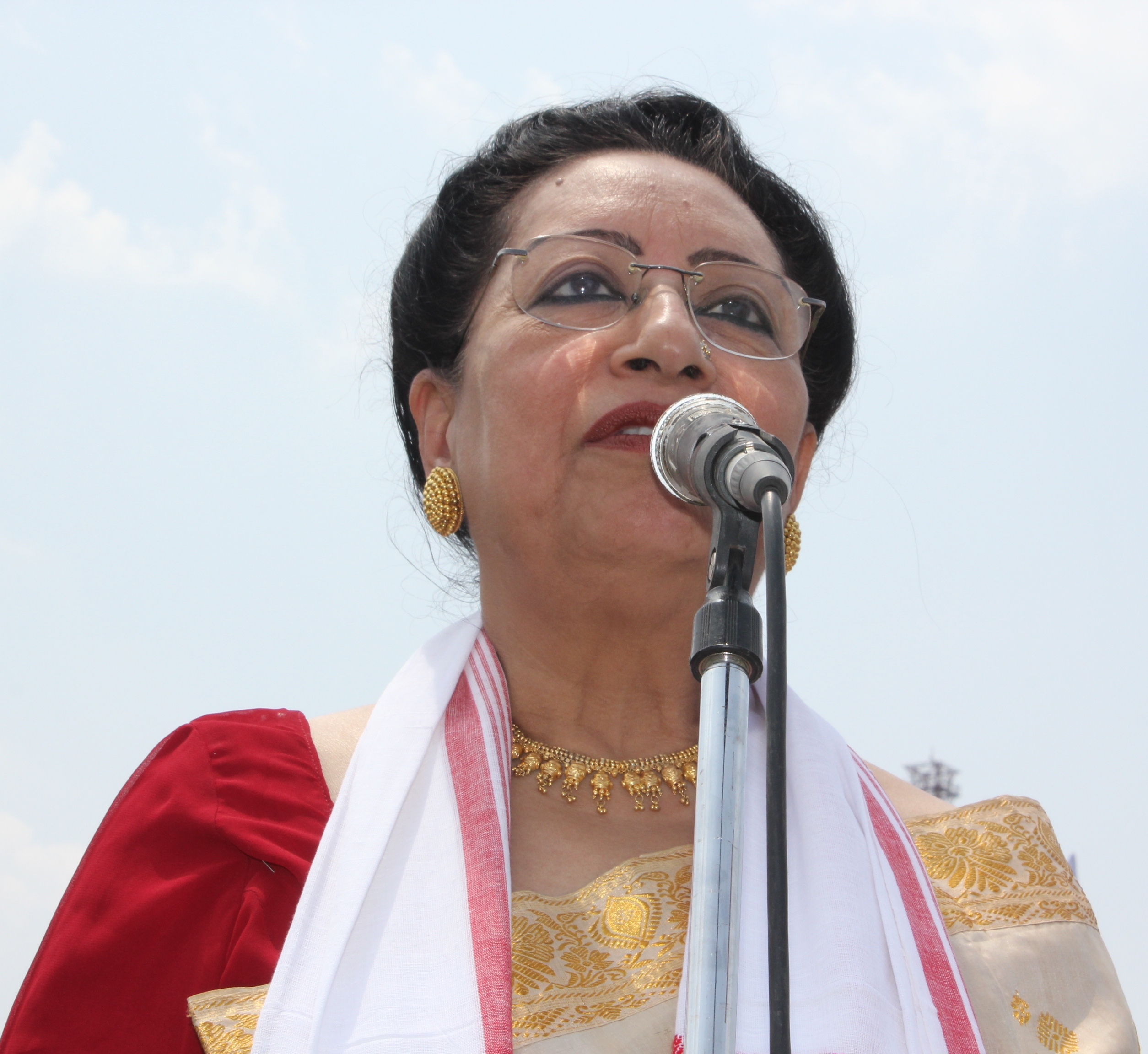
- Sultana in 2012

Background information
- Born: May 1950 (age 75–76); Puranigudam, Nagaon, Assam, India
- Origin: Nagaon, Assam, India
- Genres: Hindustani classical music; khayal; ghazal; bhajan; thumri; pop; filmi
- Occupation: Singer
- Instruments: Vocals, tanpura
- Years active: 1962–present
- Labels: His Master's Voice; Polydor Records; Music India; Bharat Records; Auvidis; Magnasound; Sonodisc; Amigo
- Spouse: Ustad Dilshad Khan
- Parents: Ikramul Majid (father); Marufa Majid (mother)
- Awards: Padma Bhushan (2014) Padma Shri (1976); Sangeet Natak Akademi Award (1998)

Begum Parween Sultana (Assamese pronunciation: [bɛɡɔm paɹwin sultana]; born 24 May 1950) is an Indian Hindustani classical singer of the Patiala Gharana. She was awarded the Padma Shri in 1976 and the Padma Bhushan in 2014 by the Government of India and the Sangeet Natak Akademi Award by the Sangeet Natak Akademi in 1998.

== Career ==
Begum Parween Sultana received training from Chinmoy Lahiri, among others. She started her professional career with Abdul Majid's Assamese Film Morom Trishna. She has sung for Bollywood movies such as Gadar, Kudrat, Do Boond Pani, and Pakeezah, and several other Assamese films. Recently, she sang the theme song of Vikram Bhatt's 1920. She also sang Humein Tumse Pyaar Kitna for the film Kudrat in 1981.

She has recorded for His Master's Voice, Polydor, Music India, Bharat Records, Auvidis, Magnasound, Sonodisc, and Amigo.

Sultana is often accompanied by Pandit Shrinivas Acharya on the harmonium. Her vocal range is nearly 4 and a half octaves.

== Personal life ==
Sultana is married to Ustad Dilshad Khan from whom she also took lessons of music. They have one daughter named Shadab Sultana Khan.

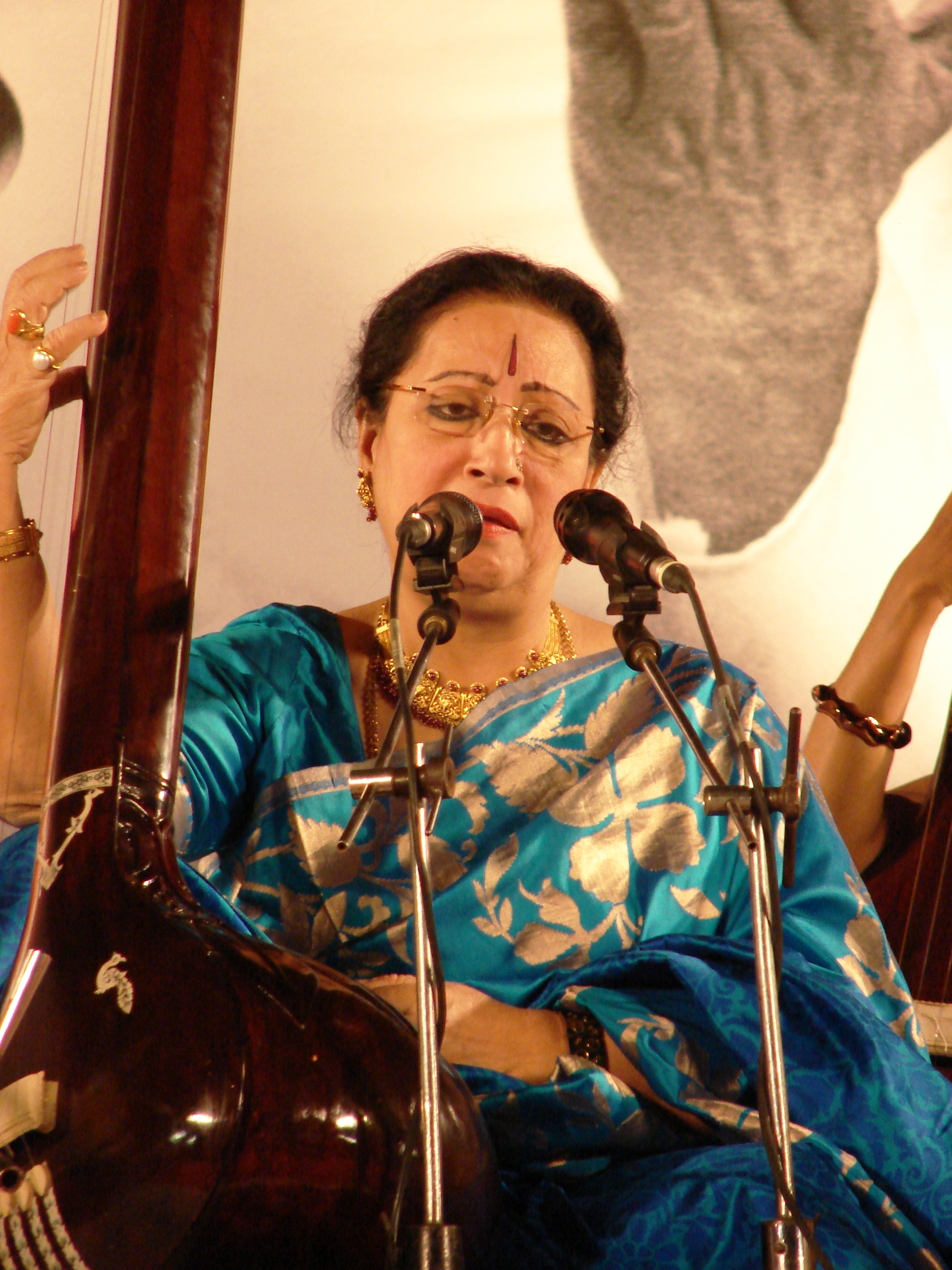
Parveen Sultana performing in Arghya 2011

== Awards and recognition ==
- Gandharva Kalanidhi, 1980
- Miyan Tansen Prize, 1986
- Sangeet Samraggi conferred by the Assam Government, 1994
- 1982: Filmfare Best Female Playback Award--film Kudrat (1981) for the song "Hamein Tumse Pyar Kitna"
- Sangeet Natak Akademi Award, 1999
- Srimant Sankardev award by the Assam government
- 2014: Padma Bhushan by Government of India

== Discography ==
- An hour of Ecstasy (Raga Madhuwanti/Raga Gorakh Kalyan/Raga Mishra Bhairavi thumri/Bhajan)
- Narayani (Raga Narayani)
- Ghazals
- Young Voices of India (Modern Ghazals)- Maikada se utha ke pila Saaqiya
- Begum Parveen Sultana- (Raga Salag Varali todi/Raga Lalita/ Raga Khamaj thumri)
- Enchanting Bhajans (Raga Rageshri/Bhajan/Bhajan/Bhajan)
- Ethereal Duo- with Dilshad Khan (Raga Marwa/Raga Kaushi Nat/Raga Mishra Bhairavi thumri)
- Genius of Parveen Sultana (Raga Kalavati/Raga Rageshri/Hori thumri/Malhar Mala bhajan)
- Homage to Guru (Raga Shyam Kauns/Raga Shuddh Sarang/Raga Mishra Kafi hori thumri)
- Impeccable Soprano Parveen Sultana & Innovative Tenor Dilshad Khan- with Dilshad Khan (Raga Rageshri/Raga Hansdhwani)
- Innovation Greets Tradition (Raga Sarang Kauns/Raga Miya ki Malhar)
- Khayal & Thumri (Raga Kusumi Kalyan/Raga Mangal Bhairav/Raga Bhairavi thumri)
- Marvellous Jugalbandi- with Dilshad Khan (Raga Bhatiyaar/Raga Kaushi Kanada)
- Megh-Manavi (Raga Megh/Raga Manavi/Raag Hemant thumri)
- One Plus One...In Harmony- with Dilshad Khan (Raga Multani/Raga Puriya Dhanashri)
- Le Chant Khayal de Parveen Sultana et Dilshad Khan- with Dilshad Khan (Raga Kalavati/Raga Megh Malhar/Raga Bageshri/Raga Mishra Pahadi thumri)
- Two Voices- with Dilshad Khan (Raga Puriya Dhanashri/Raga Hansdhwani/Raga Bhairavi sadra)
- Phenomenal Performance (Raga Ahir Bhairav/Raga Nand Kauns/Raga Bhairavi sadra)
- Parveen Sultana Sings Rare Melodies (Raga Rajni Kalyan/Raga Deen Todi)
- Khayal Se Bhajan Tak- with Dilshad Khan (Vol 1 to Vol 4)
- Duologue in Raga- with Dilshad Khan (Raga Kedar bhajan/Raga Leelavati/Raga Rageshri/Raga Todi) 1992
- From Dawn Until Night (De l'aube à la nuit) – with Dilshad Khan (Raga Gujri todi/Raga Kuvalaya Bhairav/Raga Ambika Sarang/Raga Bhoopali tarana/Raga Amba Manohari/Raga Jog/Raga Mishra Bhairavi thumri/Meera bhajan/Brahmanand bhajan) 1995
- Parveen (Raga Rageshri/Raga Mishra Mand) 2004
- Simply Divine (Raga Puriya Dhanashri/Raga Mishra Khamaj thumri/Raga Mishra Kedar bhajan) 2004
- Maestro's Choice Parveen Sultana (Raga Maru Bihag/Raga Amba Manohari/Raga Hansdhwani tarana) 2006
- Safar (Raga Maru Bihag/Raga Hansdhwani tarana/Raga Bhairavi sadra/Meera bhajan/Sai bhajan)
- Live from Savai Gandharva Music Festival (Raga Gujri todi/Raga Jaunpuri/Kabir Bhajan); (Raga Jog/Raga Gurjri todi/Marathi song); (Raga Lalit/Raga Komal Bhairav)
- Par Excellence (Raga Madhuwanti/Raga Jog/Raga Maluha Mand) 2011
- Zen Harmony (Raga Gujri todi/Meera Bhajan)

== Filmography ==
Parween Sultana also lent her voice to several songs in films throughout the years.

- Pakeezah (1972) – Kaun gali gayo Shyam, Ban ban bole Koyaliya
- Do Boond Paani – Pital ki meri Gaagri
- Parwana (1971) – Piya ki gali
- Mukti Asm (1973 Assamese film) – Sakhiyoti Jhilmil Paakhi
- Sonma (Assamese) – Notun Tomaar Chorandhani
- Khoj (1971) – Ram kare mora Saiyaa ho aise
- Razia Sultan – Shubh Ghadi aayi re
- Ashray (the Shelter) – Shab-e-Intezaar mein kyu hai Gumsum Tamannaaye, Ae Mohabbat yu hi to tu Badnaam nahi, Dev puji puji Hindu muye
- Preet (1972; unreleased) – Yaad Sataaye din rain Mitwaa
- Tohfa Mohabbat ka – Prem ka Granth Padhaau
- Shaadi kar lo – Na tum hato...na tum hate (Qawwali)
- Vijeta (1982)- Bichhurat mose Kanha
- Kalankini Kankabati (Bengali) – Bedechhi Beena gaan Shonaabo
- Sharda – Yeh Bahut Khushi ki Nishaani hai
- Kudrat – Hame tum se Pyaar Kitna
- Anmol – Koi ishq ka rog
- Gadar: Ek Prem Katha – Aan milo Sajna (Thumri)
- 1920 – Vaada tum se hai Vaada
