= Ragas and Sagas =

Studio album by Jan Garbarek & Ustad Fateh Ali Khan
- Released: 1992
- Recorded: May 1990
- Genre: Jazz
- Length: 52:15
- Label: ECM; ECM 1442
- Producer: Manfred Eicher

Jan Garbarek chronology
I Took Up the Runes (1990)	Ragas and Sagas (1992)	StAR (1991)

Ragas and Sagas is an album by Norwegian jazz saxophonist Jan Garbarek and Pakistani Khyal vocalist Ustad Fateh Ali Khan recorded in May 1990 and released on ECM in 1992. The sextet features sarangi player Ustad Nazim Ali Khan, percussionists Ustad Shaukat Hussain and Manu Katché, and singer Deepika Thathaal, also known as Deeyah Khan.

== Reception ==
The AllMusic review by Mark W. B. Allender awarded the album 4 stars stating "For aficionados of Indian or Pakistani music, this is a great recording; Garbarek's lines are right in step with the traditional styles of improvisation. Listeners unacquainted with these traditions will find this recording a mesmerizingly exotic disc. Those familiar with Garbarek's work will be very surprised. This is a unique recording for him; one can only hope that he makes further explorations in this vein."

Professional ratings
Review scores
Source	Rating
AllMusic	4/5 stars
The Penguin Guide to Jazz Recordings	3.5/4 stars

== Track listing ==
All compositions by Ustad Fateh Ali Khan except as indicated

1. "Raga I" – 8:44
2. "Saga" (Jan Garbarek) – 5:28
3. "Raga II" – 13:08
4. "Raga III" – 11:56
5. "Raga IV" – 12:56

== Personnel ==
- Jan Garbarek – soprano saxophone, tenor saxophone
- Ustad Fateh Ali Khan – voice
- Ustad Nazim Ali Khan – sarangi
- Ustad Shaukat Hussain – tabla
- Deepika Thathaal – voice
- Manu Katché – drums
