= Raza Ali Khan =

Indian singer (born 1962)

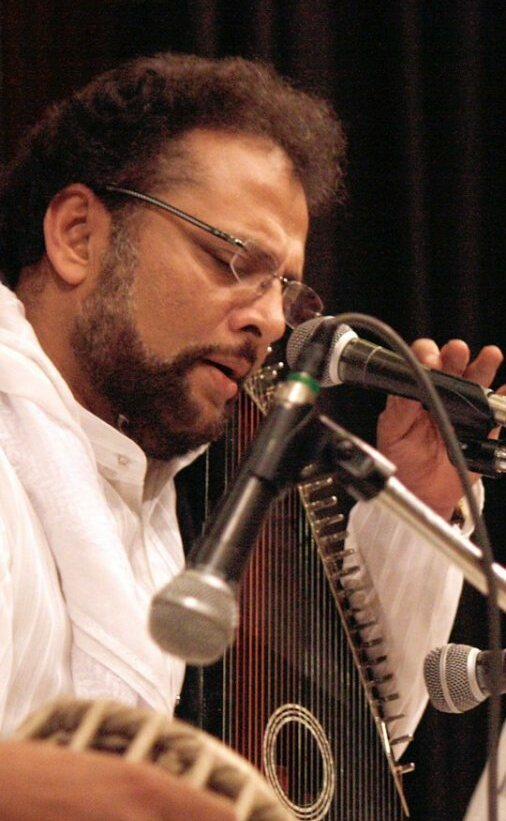
- Raza Ali Khan, performing

Background information
- Born: 8 August 1962 (age 64); Bombay, India
- Genre: Hindustani classical music
- Occupation: Hindustani classical vocalist

Raza Ali Khan (born 8 August 1962) is an Indian classical vocalist of the Patiala gharana.

He was formerly married to Indian film and television actress Neelima Azeem.

== Early years ==
Raza Ali Khan was born in Bombay to Hindustani classical vocalist Ustad Munawar Ali Khan, who was the son of Ustad Bade Ghulam Ali Khan. He received his early training from his grandfather and then from his father. He also accompanied his father on concerts.

== Career ==
Raza Ali performs Khayal, Thumri, Dadra, Ghazal, Geet, Sozkhani, Noha Khani, and Manqabat.

He gave his first solo performance at the Youth Festival in 1977 at the Eden Garden Stadium at Calcutta.

He has composed Ghazals for Ghulam Ali which were released by Venus, 'Moods and Emotions' and for Penaz Masani which was released by Polydor, 'Dharkan'. He remained the chief music director of Venus for four years. He also gave music in a Telefilm named Bindia which was produced by Doordarshan and was directed by Uma Vasudeva.

== Discography ==
- Gharana Lineage (NAVRAS Records, London)
- 3 Generations (Gathani Records, Calcutta)
- A Tribute to Ustad Bade Ghulam Ali Khan, (Audio Rec, London)
- Homage to Ustad Bade Ghulam Ali Khan, Raagleela and Shadab released from Venus
- Ustad Raza Ali Khan live in Karachi released by APMC.
