= Patiala gharana =

Classical music vocal traditional singing style

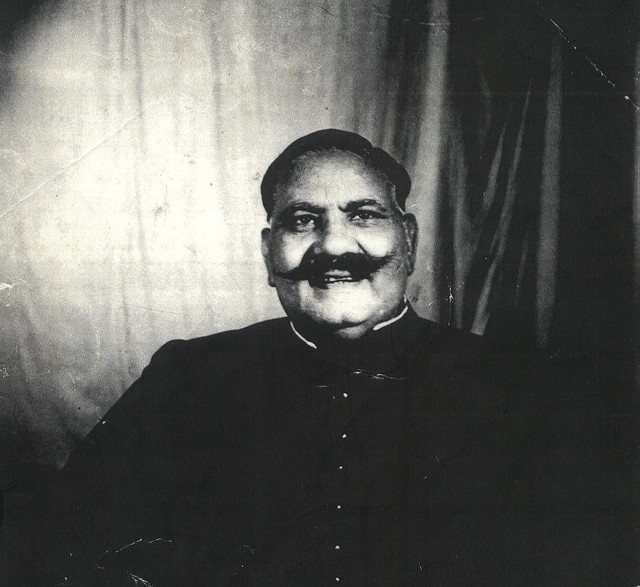
Ustad Bade Ghulam Ali Khan (1902 – 1968), the most prominent exponent of the Patiala gharana

The Patiala gharana is one of the vocal gharanas (tradition, school, or style of music) of Hindustani classical music, named after the city of Patiala in Punjab, India where it was established. The gharana was founded in the mid to late 19th century by Mian Kallu (also known as Kalu-miya Khan), a sārangi player of the Jaipur durbar. He received his musical training from the last Mughal king Bahadur Shah Zafar's court musician Qutub Bakhsh 'Tanras' Khan (Delhi gharana) and went on to become the court musician to the Maharaja of Patiala. Eventually, the mantle was passed on to his son, Ustad Nabi Baksh Khan 'General' Ali Baksh Khan and his close friend 'Colonel' Fateh Ali Khan, both of whom became court musicians in the court of Maharaja Rajinder Singh. The titles of 'general' and 'colonel' of music were bestowed upon them by the Victor Alexander Bruce, the 9th Earl of Elgin, after the duo had enthralled him with their performance. Their pairing was popularly referred to as 'Ali-a-Fattu ki Jodi.'

Although the Patiala gharana was originally founded by Mian Kallu, it is widely acknowledged that it was Ustad Nabi Baksh khan, Ali Baksh Khan and Fateh Ali Khan who popularised the Patiala singing tradition by bringing its acclaim and attention across the subcontinent. The Patiala gharana was inspired and influenced by four musical gharanas – Delhi, Gwalior, Riva, and Jaipur, and it is particularly noted for its ghazal, thumri, and khayal singing styles. Of the numerous vocal gharanas in Hindustani classical music, the Patiala gharana is estimated to have the broadest and most prominent representation on both sides of the India-Pakistan border.

In the latter half of the 20th century, the Patiala style of khayal singing took on two distinct forms. The first form was originated by siblings Ustad Amanat Ali Khan (1922 – 1974) and Ustad Bade Fateh Ali Khan (1935 – 2017) Ustad Baqur Hussain khan (1923 - 2003 Punjab, India). The other, originating from Kasur, Pakistan, was produced by siblings Ustad Bade Ghulam Ali Khan (1902 – 1968) and Ustad Barkat Ali Khan (1907 – 1963). Ustad Bade Ghulam Ali Khan is generally acknowledged to be the most influential exponent of the Patiala gharana, while Ustad Amanat Ali Khan is widely considered its most prominent scion. The gharana is now generally referred to as the Kasur-Patiala gharana.

== History ==
Due to the decline of the Mughal empire, former musicians in its orbit migrated elsewhere to find new patronage (leading to musical innovation and experimentation), one such location was Patiala. The Patiala gharana developed in the 19th and 20th centuries owing to the courtly patronage afforded to musicians by the ruling dynasty of Patiala, such as during the reigns of rulers Karam Singh, Rajinder Singh, Bhupinder Singh, and Yadvinder Singh, being linked to Ustad Ali Baksh and Ustad Fateh Ali Khan. Various regional musical traditions influenced its development, including from Delhi, Gwalior, Lahore, Jaipur, Tonk, Kasur, Kashmir, and Kapurthala. Karam Singh hired Miyan Ditte Khan as his court musician, who was succeeded by his son Miyan Kallu Khan. Miyan Kallu Khan is attributed as being the founder of the Patiala gharana and was trained by Tanras Khan of the Delhi gharana. He was succeeded by his son Ali Bakhsh and relative Fateh Ali, whom were trained by Goki Bai of the Jaipur gharana. The musicians trained by Ali Bakhsh and Fateh Ali are known as Aliya-Fattu. The Patiala gharana shares a foundational link to the Gwalior gharana (such as in regards to the ashtang tradition and khayal gayaki), as many of its early proponents were trained in that gharana. The Patiala gharana was innovative in regards to layakari, taans, and tappa.

The most prominent practitioner in the 20th century was Ustad Bade Ghulam Ali Khan, who was taught by Ustad Kale Khan. Under Bhupinder Singh and Yadvinder Singh, secular, religious, courtly, and popular music such as by the muscians Ustad Ali Bakhsh, Ustad Fateh Ali Khan, Ustad Kale Khan, the rababi Bhai Mehboob Ali ("Booba Rababi"), and the kirtani Mahant Gajja Singh were patronized. In the early 20th century, patronage shifted to major cities, such as Calcutta and Bombay as courtly patronage declined. Thus, musicians sought new avenues of expression, such as via radio, music conferences, and urban listening circles. Despite Ustad Bade Ghulam Ali Khan never performing in Patiala, being based in Calcutta, he was responsible for popularizing the Patiala gharana via thumri records and his popular renditions of the Bhopali, Hameer, and Adana ragas. Some of Bade Ghulam Ali Khan's son was Munawar Ali Khan and students of either the father and son include Parveen Sultana, Ajoy Chakraborty, and Kaushiki Chakraborty. After the partition of India in 1947, some musician lineages associated with the Patiala gharana migrated to Pakistan, such as family of Ali Baksh Jarnail, namely Amanat Ali Khan and Fateh Ali Khan, meanwhile Bade Ghulam Ali Khan and his ilk briefly stayed in Pakistan but returned to India. The India-based tradition is characterized by esoteric khayal gayaki in regards to raga, aalaap, taal, and thumris. Meanwhile, the Pakistan-based tradition focused on qawwali.

== Characteristics ==
=== Improvisations ===
The Patiala gharana is known to be an amalgamated vocal style of singing and is influenced to some extent by the folk music of Punjab. The Patiala singing tradition is known for its creative improvisations by borrowing freely from other gharanas and merging them aesthetically to enhance the khayal form of singing. The original thumri compositions of Ali Baksh Khan and Fateh Ali Khan were known for their swift taans set in the traditional tappe folk style of Punjab. The influence of these Punjabi tappe as well as the Sindhi Kafi style of singing is said to have substantially altered the Patiala approach to khayal singing.

The Patiala technique of music is noted for its delicate style, use of intricate vocal embellishments (such as gamak, meend, and murki) and for its numerous bandishes – structure-bound "summaries" of ragas. Pandit Iman Das, an exponent of the Patiala gharana from Bangalore, India explains that the distinguishing features of the Patiala style of singing are "long meends, heavy gamaks, electrifying taans, shuddha aakar, bol-banavat, and some elements of Punjabi folk interspersed with surprise elements like murkis and harkats."

A special feature of the Patiala gharana approach to singing is its rendering of intricate taans. These are very rhythmic, vakra (complicated) and firat taans, and are not bound by the rhythmic cycle. Taans with clear aakar are presented not through the throat but through the navel. Specifically, singers in the gharana tend to sing from the chest or diaphragm and not with their head voice. Vocalists in the Patiala tradition sing in a strong, open-throated voice with intricate and analytical use of notes in three octaves.

The Patiala singing form tends to favour pentatonic ragas such as Malkauns for their ornamentation. Other ragas popular with singers of this gharana are Darbari Kanhra, Ramkali, Shuddha Kalyan, and Bageshree. Ektaal and teentaal are the most common taals favoured by vocalists in the gharana. Pandit Shantanu Bhattacharayya, a well-known Patiala vocalist, notes about the Patiala singing style that "akaars, bol banaavs and bolbants exhibit the temperament of a painter. Each phrase is rendered like colouring a picture – vivid with imagery. There are certain features of this gharana that surface suddenly. Taans and boltaans can intersperse the bandish. There is an element of unpredictability."

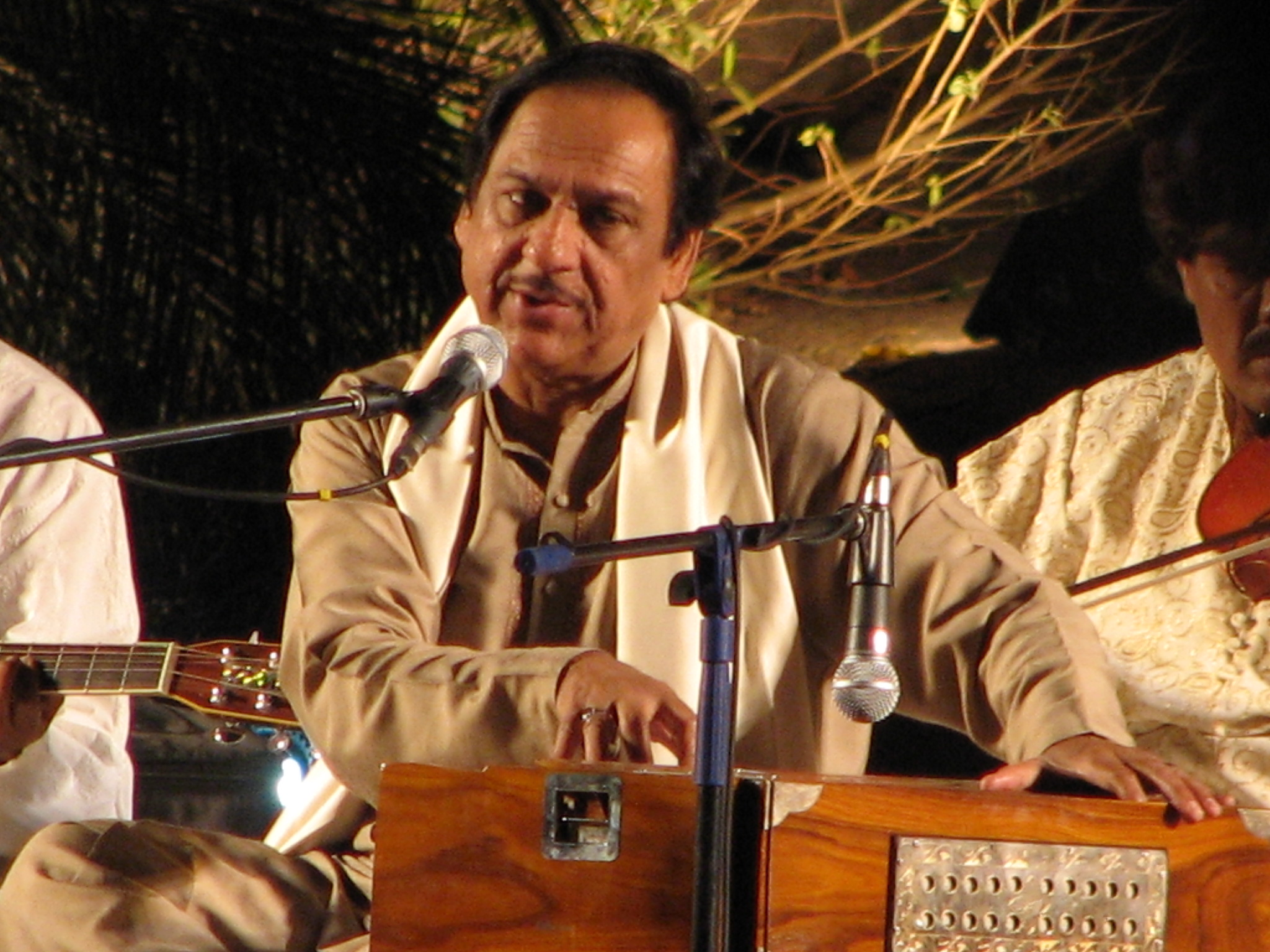
Renowned ghazal singer Ghulam Ali, an exponent of the Patiala gharana

=== Singing style and training ===
Singers in the gharana are known for their emotionally evocative and sensual singing style, and particular emphasis is placed on clear diction and enunciation. Patiala exponent Raza Ali Khan states: "the voice culture in this gharana has a beautiful, emotive aspect, and you will see that in all the vocalists who sing this gayaki. You can hear elation, sorrow and mischief, among others, all in the voice." The gharana also has lyrical compositions that have been passed down from generation to generation, and even to disciples and students from outside the family. Singers in the Patiala tradition especially excel in Malkauns, Darbari, Adana, Des, Bhopali, and Multani ragas, according to noted gharana exponent Ustad Hamid Ali Khan. Patiala vocalists are also known for their highly complex expositions of ragas.

Pandit Ajoy Chakrabarty, a noted vocalist in the Patiala tradition today, has explained that Patiala gayaki (singing) is particularly difficult to master and requires dedicated, years-long practice and preparation. He notes that essential requirements of the Patiala manner of singing are correct enunciation (bani), correct voice throw (aakar), correct articulation of scales (sargam) and above all, excellent tayyari (practice). Pandit Iman Das concurs and has stated that the Patiala technique of singing is "an extremely complex style to learn" and requires "rigorous riyaz for years." Vocalists in the Patiala gharana typically perform in pairs. Ustad Hamid Ali Khan explains: "Our ancestors devised this method of singing in pairs, so that the next generation always sticks together. So, while both partners have a full range, in public performances one would take care of the durat (fast tempo) while the other would take on alap (improvised sections of ragas)."

=== Experimentation ===
Exponents of the Patiala gharana are known for their willingness to experiment and blend traditional musical forms with newer genres and styles of music. In an interview, Shafqat Amanat Ali noted: "We are as much rooted to our gharana as we are adapting to modern music. As musicians, we have been embracing modern music. Nobody in my family objected to my singing pop or any other genre. In fact, musicians from Patiala gharana have time and again experimented fearlessly. My father sang ghazals when it was not the taste of classical artistes. He was, in fact, criticised for that. Many classical vocalists were shocked and surprised when we sang Khayal, which again was a bold step for Dhrupad vocalists."

=== Sufi traditions ===
The early Patiala vocalists were known to be associated with Chishti Sufis. This is reflected in the fact that lyrics of many of the gharana's compositions have recurring Sufi leitmotifs – most clearly evident in their signature raga, Ram Saakh which was composed by Mian Kallu himself. In fact, the bandish of this raga alludes to the gharana's devotion to the Sufi master Moinuddin Chishti, also known as Khwājā Ghareeb Nawaz. Later and modern-day Patiala exponents have continued to incorporate elements of Sufi music into their classical and pop compositions.

=== Marsiya recitations ===
The Patiala family (descendants of Ali Baksh Khan and Akhtar Hussain) has a generations-old tradition of performing marsiya, noha, and soz-o-salaam recitations during Muharram to commemorate the martyrdom of Husayn ibn Ali and elegize the events of the Battle of Karbala. "Mujrai Khalq Mein" and "Yeh Sochta Hoon" are among the most well known of these lamentations.

== Patiala gharana exponents ==
=== 19th Century ===
- Ali Baksh "Jarnail" (1850–1920), founder and member of "Ali-a-Fattu" duo with Fateh Ali "Karnail."

=== 20th Century ===
- Akhtar Hussain Khan (1900–1974) – Father of Amanat Ali Khan, Bade Fateh Ali Khan and Hamid Ali Khan already listed below.
- Bade Ghulam Ali Khan (1902–1968), disciple of Ali Baksh Khan, Kale Khan, and Ashiq Ali Khan.
- Barkat Ali Khan (1908–1963), brother and disciple of Bade Ghulam Ali Khan.
- Abdul Rehman Khan (1927–1996), son and disciple of Ata Mohammad Khan.
- Vasantrao Deshpande (1920–1983), disciple of Ashiq Ali Khan.
- Mohammad Hussain Sarahang (1924–1983), disciple of Ashiq Ali Khan.
- Prasun Banerjee (1926–1997), disciple of Bade Ghulam Ali Khan.
- Lakshmi Shankar (1926–2013), disciple of Abdul Rehman Khan.
- Farida Khanum (b. 1929), disciple of Ashiq Ali Khan.
- Amanat Ali Khan (1922–1974), son and disciple of Akhtar Hussain Khan.
- Bade Fateh Ali Khan (1935–2017), son and disciple of Akhtar Hussain Khan.
- Jagdish Prasad (1937–2011), disciple of Bade Ghulam Ali Khan.
- Ghulam Ali (b. 1940), disciple of Bade Ghulam Ali Khan.
- Parveen Sultana (b. 1950), disciple of Ikramul Majid Khan.
- Hamid Ali Khan (b. 1953), son and disciple of Akhtar Hussain Khan.
- Munawar Ali Khan (1930–1989), son of Bade Ghulam Ali Khan.
- Mazhar Ali Khan (1959 - 2021), son and disciple of Karamat Ali Khan, and his grandfather Munawar Ali Khan
- Jawaad Ali Khan (b. 1962), son and disciple of Karamat Ali Khan, and his grandfather Munawar Ali Khan
- Raza Ali Khan (b. 1962), son and disciple of Munawar Ali Khan.

=== 21st Century ===
- Sajjad Ali, disciple of his uncle Munawar Ali Khan in India
- Sadaat Shafqat Amanat, son of Shafqat Amanat Ali Khan
- Shiv Dayal Batish
- Som Dutt Battu
- Ajoy Chakraborty, disciple of Munawar Ali Khan
- Kaushiki Chakraborty, daughter and disciple of Ajoy Chakraborty
- Rahul Deshpande, grandson and disciple of Vasantrao Deshpande
- Sanjukta Ghosh
- Asad Amanat Ali Khan
- Johar Ali Khan
- Shafqat Amanat Ali Khan
- Samrat Pandit
- Barkat Sidhu
- Mohammad Aizaz Sohail
