= Mominpura Graveyard =

Cemetery in Lahore, Pakistan

- مومن پورہ قبرستان
- Interactive map of Mominpura Graveyard

Details
- Established: late 18th century
- Location: Lakshmi Chowk, opposite Empire Cinema, Lahore, Punjab, Pakistan
- Coordinates: 31.5644°N 74.3159°E
- Type: Private Shia Muslim cemetery
- Owned by: Mominpura Graveyard Committee (Qizilbash family trustees)
- No. of graves: 10,000+

The Mominpura Graveyard is a Shia cemetery in Lahore, Pakistan. It is one of the oldest graveyards in Lahore, and contains over 10,000 burials according to its records. Many graves are hundreds of years old. Established by the Qizilbash family, the cemetery is situated near the Lakshmi Chowk, opposite Empire Cinema.

== History ==
On 11 January 1998 (8.15am PST), unidentified gunmen stormed the graveyard and opened fire on a congregation of people offering prayers. The attack, believed to be motivated by sectarianism, resulted in 22 deaths and 51 injuries. Sunni militants were blamed for the massacre. The shooting was condemned by Punjab's chief minister Shahbaz Sharif as a "most heinous and inhuman act of terrorism."

== Notable burials ==
Several notable individuals are buried here, including first home secretary of Punjab Syed Ahmad Ali, film director Qamar Zaidi, Nasir Kazmi, Sayyid Sajjad Rizvi, Mushaf Ali Mir, and singers Ustad Amanat Ali Khan, Ustad Fateh Ali Khan, and Asad Amanat Ali Khan.
