= Akhtar Hussain Khan (musician) =

Pakistani classical musician (1896-1974)

Akhtar Hussain Khan (1896 – 12 June 1974) was a Pakistani classical vocalist and musician belonging to one of the major vocal gharanas (musical traditions) of Hindustani classical music – the Patiala Gharana.

== Early life and career ==
Akhtar Hussain Khan was the only son as well as a student of one of the founders of the Patiala Gharana, Ali Baksh Jarnail (1850-1920). Besides his father, Khan also studied music under Mian Qadir Bakhsh II of Sialkot.

He was the father and teacher of Ustad Fateh Ali Khan and Ustad Amanat Ali Khan, the renowned classical music duo from Pakistan. Other notable students include Ghulam Hussain Khan, Ghulam Rasool, Ustad Talib Hussain, Qazi Habib Ullah, and Tahira Syed.

In addition to being a classical vocalist, Khan also served as a supervisor at Radio Pakistan, Lahore.

== Death ==
Khan died on 12 June 1974 in Lahore, Pakistan, at the age of 78, just a few months prior to the death of his son, Amanat Ali Khan (1922 - 18 September 1974). He is buried in Mominpura Graveyard in Lahore, Pakistan.
