= Amanat Ali Khan =

Pakistani classical vocalist (1922–1974)

Ustad Amanat Ali Khan PP
- امانت علی خان
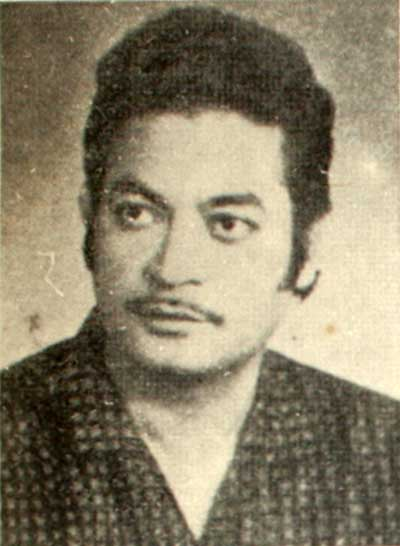
- Born: 1922; Hoshiarpur, Punjab, British India (present-day Punjab, India)
- Died: 18 September 1974 (aged 52); Lahore, Punjab, Pakistan
- Occupations: Classical vocalist; ghazal singer; composer
- Years active: 1945 – 1974
- Children: 7, including: Asad Amanat Ali Khan; Shafqat Amanat Ali
- Father: Akhtar Hussain
- Relatives: Bade Fateh Ali Khan (brother); Hamid Ali Khan (brother)
- Awards: Pride of Performance by the President of Pakistan (1969)

Ustad Amanat Ali Khan PP (Urdu: امانت علی خان; pronounced [əˈmaːnət əˈliː xaːn]; 1922 – 18 September 1974) was a Pakistani classical vocalist from the Patiala gharana tradition of music and is widely regarded as one of the finest classical and ghazal singers of all time. Together with his younger brother, Ustad Bade Fateh Ali Khan (1935 – 2017), he formed a famed singing duo that garnered widespread popularity across the Indian subcontinent. For his contributions to classical music, Amanat Ali was honoured (along with Fateh Ali) with the highest national literary award of Pakistan – the Pride of Performance – by the President of Pakistan in 1969. Khan was especially noted for khayal, thumri, and ghazal styles of singing and has been described as "the maestro of the Patiala gharana." He stands with singing icons like Mehdi Hassan and Ahmed Rushdi, having left behind a legacy of hundreds of classical and semi-classical songs.

== Early life and background ==
Amanat Ali Khan was born in 1922 in Hoshiarpur (in present-day Punjab, India) to Ustad Akhtar Hussain Khan who was a distinguished vocalist in the patronage of the Maharaja of Patiala. He was the grandson of Ali Baksh Jarnail, one of the founders of the Patiala vocal gharana of classical music. Amanat Ali and Fateh Ali both trained under the tutelage of their father. After the partition of India in 1947, Amanat Ali migrated to Pakistan with his family.

== Career ==
Khan, along with his brother Fateh Ali, started performing at the Maharaja of Patiala Yadavindra Singh's court when he was still in his mid-teens. Both brothers made their public singing debut in 1945 in Lahore, at a concert sponsored by an influential music patron, Pandit Jeevanlal Matoo. In 1949, the duo performed at the prestigious All Bengal Music Conference in Kolkata (then Calcutta), India, which brought them widespread recognition in both India and Pakistan. Thereafter, both brothers toured South Asia extensively and became representatives of the Patiala gharana across the subcontinent. Khan was a prolific performer on PTV and Radio Pakistan and was one of the few vocalists in the 1960s and 1970s to gain popularity and critical acclaim for both classical and ghazal formats of singing.

Khan possessed an in-depth understanding of Urdu poetry which helped him not only select the works of renowned Urdu poets to use in his ghazals but also interpret their meanings fully in his musical renditions. He was especially known for his skill with melodic ornamentations and progressive intensification of taans. One of the best-known thumris sung by the Amanat Ali-Fateh Ali duo – Kab Aaoge Tum Aaoge – was composed by Amanat Ali and is considered a classic. The song is also representative of the duo's efforts in making classical music accessible and appealing to all segments of the population.

Indian playback singer Lata Mangeshkar (1929 – 2022) trained in Hindustani classical music with Amanat Ali Khan for a brief period of time in the early stages of her career, before Khan migrated to Pakistan with his family in 1947.

Throughout his career, Khan sang numerous patriotic songs, most notably "Chand Meri Zameen, Phool Mera Watan" and "Aye Watan Pyare Watan." Along with composers such as Sohail Rana and Mian Shehryar, Khan is credited with recognising "the necessity of establishing simple-to-grasp anthems that would augment the national morale of the masses" and for incorporating literary knowledge into his work.

== Artistry and voice ==
Amanat Ali was said to have possessed "prodigious talent" and a "gifted voice." It is said that while Fateh Ali had mastery over ragas, Amanat Ali had great command and dexterity in sur (svara). He was particularly well known for his full-throated and flamboyant singing style in the upper registers, while Fateh Ali was more adept at singing lower notes, thus complementing each other during their performances. Khan was lauded for simplifying the structure of complex Hindustani classical ragas and his vocals have been variously described as soft, sensuous, and smooth. He is considered by many as the most prominent scion of the Patiala gharana.

== Death ==
Khan died of a ruptured appendix at the relatively young age of 52 in Lahore, Pakistan on 18 September 1974, only a few months after the death of his father, Akhtar Hussain. One of his sons, Asad Amanat Ali Khan (1955 – 2007), after a highly successful career as a classical vocalist and ghazal singer, died from cardiac arrest on 8 April 2007 in London, United Kingdom. Both father and son are buried in Mominpura Graveyard near Lakshmi Chowk in Lahore. After the passing of his brother and lifelong singing partner, Fateh Ali struggled with depression and stopped singing for two years. He eventually resumed performing with his youngest brother Hamid Ali Khan and Amanat Ali's son Asad Amanat Ali Khan.

== Discography ==
Some of Amanat Ali Khan's most popular songs are:

- "Mora Jiya Na Lage"
- "Pyar Nahi Hai Sur Se"
- "Kab Aaoge Tum Aaoge"
- "Dil Mein Meethe Meethe Dard"
- "Aalam-o-Masaib Se"
- "Piya Nahi Aaye"
- "Chup Dhawen Te"
- "Mah-e-Nau Ko Kya Pata"
- "Piya Dekhan Ko"
- "Kabhi Jo Nikhate Gul"
- "Data Tore Dwar"
- "Piya Nahi Aaye"
- "Tum Re Daras"
- "Chand Meri Zameen, Phool Mera Watan"
- "Aye Watan Pyare Watan"

Some of Khan's most well-known ghazals are:

- "Yeh Aarzoo Thi Tujhe Gul Ke"
- "Mausam Badla"
- "Yeh Na Thi Hamari Qismat"
- "Insha Ji Utho" (first performed on Pakistan Television in January 1974)
- "Honton Pe Kabhi Unke"
- "Ab Haq Mein Baharon Ke"
- "Meri Dastaan-e-Hasrat"
- "Ae Dila Hum Hue Paband"
- "Kaise Guzar Gai Hai Jawani"
- "Yaar Ko Maine"
- "Jo Guzri Mujh Pe"
- "Ek Khalish Ko"
- "Khudi Ka Nasha Charha"
- "Har Ek Simt"
- "Ae Dil Hum Huwe"
- "Aa Mere Pyar Ki"
- "Maze Jahaan Ke Apni Nazar Mein"
- "Tere Hote Huwe"
- "Har Ek Simt"
- "Mujhe Dil Ki Khata Par"

== See also ==
- Hamid Ali Khan (a noted exponent of the Patiala gharana and youngest brother of Amanat Ali Khan).
- Asad Amanat Ali Khan (an accomplished classical and ghazal singer and a son of Amanat Ali Khan).
- Shafqat Amanat Ali Khan (an accomplished pop, classical, and playback singer and the youngest son of Amanat Ali Khan).
