= Mazhar Khan (cricketer) =

Pakistani cricketer (born 1964)

Mazhar Saleem Khan, born 11 September 1964 in Rawalpindi, Pakistan, is a Pakistani-born former cricketer who played for the Oman national cricket team. He played a right-handed batsman and right-arm off-spin bowler. He made several appearances for the Omani national team as a batsman in the 2005 ICC Trophy. He later coached Oman at the 2007 World Cricket League Division Two tournament.
