= Hamid Ali Khan =

Pakistani classical singer (born 1953)

- Born: 1953 (age 72–73); Lahore, Pakistan
- Occupations: Classical music vocalist, Pakistan Television performer (Patiala gharana of classical music with nephew Asad Amanat Ali Khan)
- Years active: 1970s - present
- Known for: Ghazal singing, Pakistani classical music
- Children: Raga Boyz
- Awards: Pride of Performance Award by the President of Pakistan in 2007; Sitara-i-Imtiaz (Star of Excellence) Award by the Government of Pakistan in 2010

Ustad Hamid Ali Khan (Urdu: استاد حامِد علی خان; born 1953) is a Pakistani classical singer. He belongs to the Patiala gharana, and as such is an exponent of ghazal and classical singing. He has released several records and performed with many famous artists, including some from India. He has also collaborated with many UK-based artists, some of the recent ones being Partha Sarathi Mukherjee (tabla) and Fida Hussain (harmonium).

== Early life and career ==
He is the son of Ustad Akhtar Hussein Khan and the youngest brother of famous Pakistani classical singers Bade Fateh Ali Khan and Amanat Ali Khan. Hamid Ali Khan has three sons – Nayab Ali Khan, Wali Hamid Ali Khan and Inam Ali Khan – who follow in his footsteps and have created their own band called Raga Boyz. One of his sons, Wali Hamid Ali Khan, apart from singing, has stepped into acting with his first serial Kaisi Aurat Hoon Main.

"Since most of the newer singers like Shafqat Amanat Ali have moved away from classical Patiala style singing, this leaves Amanat's only brother Hamid Ali Khan, as the last of the Patiala legends."

"He inherits the unrestrained style of singing from his father, the late Ustad Akhtar Hussain Khan and shares the flair with his brothers, Bade Fateh Ali Khan and Amanat Ali Khan. An authentic moving portrait of the Patiala gharana. Hamid Ali Khan creates his own world. A world set mostly within the comfort of his unfaltering sense of raags and rhythm, immaculate melodies and unparalleled control over his voice."

In 2016, the two brothers Hamid Ali Khan and Bade Fateh Ali Khan performed together on stage in a live concert.

== Awards ==
- Hamid Ali Khan joined his brother, Amanat Ali Khan, by also winning the Pride of Performance Award in 2007.
- In 2010, the Government of Pakistan presented him with the Sitara-i-Imtiaz Award.
- Hamid Ali Khan was presented several awards for lifetime achievement in the field of classical music in his tour of India in 2007.

He is one of the few Pakistani artists that has won the Presidential Award more than once.

== Death rumours ==
On 1 August 2019, a fake news about the death of Hamid Ali Khan was fuelled by social media. His son, Wali Hamid Ali Khan said "Hamid Ali Khan is absolutely fine".
