= Asad Amanat Ali Khan =

Pakistani singer (1955–2007)

Asad Amanat Ali Khan PP
- اسَد امانت علی خان
- Born: 25 September 1955; Lahore, Pakistan
- Died: 8 April 2007 (aged 51); London, United Kingdom
- Occupations: Classical vocalist; ghazal singer
- Years active: 1975 – 2007
- Father: Amanat Ali Khan
- Relatives: Bade Fateh Ali Khan (uncle); Hamid Ali Khan (uncle); Shafqat Amanat Ali (brother)
- Awards: Pride of Performance by the President of Pakistan (2007)

Asad Amanat Ali Khan PP (Urdu: اسَد امانت علی خان; pronounced [ˈəsəd əˈmaːnət əˈliː xaːn]; 25 September 1955 – 8 April 2007) was a Pakistani classical vocalist and ghazal singer belonging to the Patiala Gharana tradition of music. In a career spanning 32 years, Khan sang over 1,000 songs for Pakistan Television and movie soundtracks, in addition to performing traditional classical music across the world. He was particularly noted for his command over the ghazal style of singing. Khan was the son of the prominent classical vocalist Ustad Amanat Ali Khan. For his significant contributions to classical music, he was awarded the Presidential Pride of Performance, Pakistan's highest national award in the field of art, on 23 March 2007, only a fortnight before his sudden death.

== Early life and background ==
Asad Amanat Ali Khan was born in Lahore, Pakistan to renowned classical singer Ustad Amanat Ali Khan and his wife. His great-grandfather, Ali Baksh Khan, was the founder of the Patiala Gharana discipline of music and his grandfather, Akhtar Hussain, was an eminent musician in the patronage of the Maharaja of Patiala. Asad was 19 years old when his father died, and he trained in classical music primarily with his uncle, Bade Fateh Ali Khan who also encouraged Asad to form a singing duo with his youngest brother (Asad's uncle), Hamid Ali Khan.

Asad's youngest brother Shafqat Amanat Ali Khan is a pop, classical, and playback singer. He was the lead singer of the Pakistani music band Fuzön until 2006. Shafqat describes his brother as being an innovator of Eastern music: "What we call fusion music today...Asad bhai started doing it in the 70s and 80s. He had released this album from London...It was arranged in such a way that it had one classical piece, followed by a ghazal or a Punjabi folk song and then a popular number. [He] started singing arifana kalam and gave them a new spin. This Sufi wave that is so popular today, I would say Asad bhai is one of its pioneers."

== Career ==
Khan started his musical career performing Patiala gharana thumris and recorded his first song at the age of 10. He began singing professionally after completing his FA (two year) degree and rose to prominence after singing his father's popular ghazal, Insha Ji Utho, which subsequently featured in almost every live concert he performed. He performed traditional classical music as part of the very successful singing duo with his uncle, Hamid Ali Khan, in the 1970s and 1980s, performing not only in Pakistan and India but also in the United States, Canada, The Netherlands, Australia, New Zealand, and Switzerland.

Like his father before him, Khan is credited with demystifying and simplifying complex classical ragas and adapting them for easy listening, thereby boosting their popularity and appeal among contemporary audiences.

Khan worked for Pakistan Television for many years and performed over 1,000 songs on live television. Nisar Bazmi, composer and PTV producer, who died one week before him, gave him his first break in live television singing. Khan also sang for a number of Pakistani movie soundtracks.

== Death ==
Khan traveled to London, United Kingdom in January 2007 to receive treatment for a condition known as hypertrophic cardiomyopathy. He returned to Pakistan during his treatment to receive the Pride of Performance Award from the President of Pakistan on 23 March 2007. After receiving the award, he left Pakistan for London on 3 April 2007 to continue his treatment. In London, he suffered a cardiac arrest and collapsed in Cassiobury Park while he was with his family. He died in London on 8 April 2007. Khan is survived by his wife Sharmeen Khan and their two children, Sikander and Tanya Khan.

== Discography ==
Some of his most well-known songs are as follows:

- Awaz Wo Jado Sa Jagati Hui Awaz (Saheli)
- Insha Ji Utho
- Ghar Wapis Jab Aaoge Tum
- Jo Bhi Dil Ki Hai
- Abhi Wahan Chal Diya
- Abhi Kaliyon Mein Chatak
- Umraan Langiyaan
- Main Tere Sang
- Kabhi Kaha Na Kisi Se
- Pyaar Nahii Hai Sur Se Jisko
- Abhi Kalion Mein
- Diyaar Yaar Geya
- Gham Tera Ham Ne Paa Liya
- Ham Yeh Samajh Kar Aaye
- Jo Bhi Dil Ki
- Dayar-e-Yaar Gaya
- Kal Chowdhwin Ki Raat Thi
- Tujhe Adam Nahin Milta
- Chand Sitaron Se
- Doob Gayen Sab Yaadein
- Zara Zara Dil Mein Dard Hua
- Apne Haathon Ki Lakiiron Mein
- Piya Dekhan Ko
- Hum Pyar Ke Deewane (from the film Naqshe Qadam)
- Kisi Aur Gham Mein Itni (lyrics: Mustafa Zaidi)
- Ek Lamha-e-Wisal Tha (Poet: Raees Warsi )
- Yuun Bhi Tou Raas Rooh Ko ( Poet: Raees Warsi )
- Bahot Mushkil Palat Kar Dekhna Tha (Poet: Faisal Hanif)
- Hasti Meri Mera Nizam (Poet: Muhammad Iqbal)
- Kachi Jai Tand Teri Yaari Si
- Main Nay Kaha Aaye (duet with Irum Hassan)
- Ankhain Ghazal Hain Apki

== See also ==
- Patiala Gharana
- Ali Baksh Jarnail
- Akhtar Hussain
- Amanat Ali Khan
- Bade Fateh Ali Khan
- Shafqat Amanat Ali Khan
