= Munawar Ali Khan =

Indian classical singer

- Born: Munawar Ali Khan; 15 August 1930; Lahore, Punjab, British India
- Died: 13 October 1989 (aged 59) Kolkata, West Bengal, India
- Genre: Hindustani classical music
- Occupation: Vocalist

Munawar Ali Khan (15 August 1930 – 13 October 1989) was an Indian classical and light classical vocalist of Kasur Patiala Gharana. He was the younger son of Bade Ghulam Ali Khan.

== Early life and career ==
Munawar Ali was born in 1930 in Lahore, British India. He was taught by his father Bade Ghulam Ali Khan and his uncle Barkat Ali Khan. He accompanied his father Bade Ghulam Ali Khan to all his concerts and became an integral part of his father's recital after his father had a paralytic attack in early 1961.

Munawar Ali Khan had a full-throated voice with open aakar and his style differed from his father's quicksilver style. After his father's death in 1968, he started giving solo concerts.

Munawar Ali Khan was a top-grade artist at All India Radio. He also joined Bharatiya Kala Kendra in Delhi as a music teacher. He performed in major music festivals in India and abroad. He toured extensively in Germany, Switzerland, United Kingdom, France, Australia and represented India in Afghanistan in 1986 and in Pakistan in 1984. He has several discs to his credit both in India and abroad, released by Audiorec, His Master's Voice, EMI Music and Sony Nad. With Sandhya Mukherjee he also sang for a Bengali film "Jaijawanti" (1971).

Munawar Ali Khan created many khyal and thumri bandishes as well as geet and ghazal bandishes. He sang ragas which were not very popular in his gharana, such as Shuddh Kalyan, Bairagi Bhairav, Abhogi Kanada, Suha Kanada, Devgiri Bilawal, and Ahir Bhairav, and he created a new raga named Malini Basant.

Munawar Ali Khan taught many students including his son Raza Ali Khan; his nephews Mazhar Ali Khan, Jawaad Ali Khan, and Naqi Ali Khan; Ajoy Chakraborty, Indira Misra, Primila Puri, Sanjukta Ghosh, Sangeeta Bandyopadhyay, Sajjad Ali, Adnan Salem and Kumar Mukherjee. This Kasur Patiala legacy is now carried on by his son Raza Ali Khan and his nephews Jawaad Ali Khan, Mazhar Ali Khan, Naqi Ali Khan, and Abdul Aziz Khan.

== Death ==
Munawar Ali Khan died at the age of 59 in Kolkata on 13 October 1989.

== Discography ==
- Durbar-e-Khaas (2 volume CDs)
