= Barkat Ali Khan =

Pakistani classical singer (1908-1963)

Ustad Barkat Ali Khan
- Born: 1908; Kasur, Punjab, British India
- Died: 19 July 1963 (aged 54–55) Lahore, Pakistan
- Genres: Hindustani classical music
- Occupations: Singer of ghazals, geets and classical music in Pakistan

Ustad Barkat Ali Khan (1908 – 19 June 1963) was a Pakistani classical singer, younger brother of Bade Ghulam Ali Khan and elder brother of Mubarak Ali Khan, and belonged to the Patiala gharana of music.

== Early life and career ==
Barkat Ali Khan was born in 1908 in Kasur in the Punjab province of then British India. He was initially trained by his father, Ali Baksh Khan Kasuri, and later by his elder brother Bade Ghulam Ali Khan. After the Partition of British India in 1947, Barkat Ali Khan, with his family, migrated to Pakistan and focused on the lighter aspects of Hindustani classical music. He was widely acknowledged as one of the great exponents of Thumri, Dadra, Geet and Ghazal, and was well known for both Purab and Punjab Ang Thumris. The great Mohammad Rafi was a shagird (disciple) of Barkat Ali Khan.

Many still consider Barkat Ali Khan a superior thumri singer than his elder brother, though he didn't receive acknowledgement comparable to Bade Ghulam Ali Khan. He taught noted ghazal singer Ghulam Ali. Many people in Pakistan say that simplicity and humility were the hallmarks of his personality. He started a new trend of ghazal-singing in Pakistan. Before Mehdi Hassan became known as the 'King of ghazals' in the 1970s, Barkat Ali Khan and Begum Akhtar were considered the stalwarts of ghazal-singing during the 1950s and 1960s. Barkat Ali Khan, in a rare live interview with Radio Pakistan, Lahore, had said," My forefathers, at one time, lived in the hilly tracts of Jammu and Kashmir, so they used to sing 'songs of the hills' (Pahari Geet). I learned to sing those Pahari Geets from them".

== Super-hit ghazals and geets ==
- "Woh jo hum main tum main qaraar tha, tumhe yaad ho ke na yaad ho"

Ghazal sung by Barkat Ali Khan, lyrics by the famous poet Momin Khan Momin

- "Donaun Jahan Teri Mohabbat Mein Haar Ke, Woh Jaa Raha Hai Koi Shab-e-Gham Guzaar Ke"

Ghazal sung by Ustad Barkat Ali Khan, lyrics by the renowned poet Faiz Ahmad Faiz

- "Baghon Mein Paray Jhoolay, Tum Bhool Gaey Humko, Hum Tumko Nahin Bhoolay"

Sung by Ustad Barkat Ali Khan, a folk 'Mahia' geet. Later the same song was made even more popular by his grandson Sajjad Ali

- "Abb Kay Sawan Ghar Aa Ja", a Thumri Pahari geet sung by Barkat Ali Khan
- "Hasti apni habab ki si hai", Ghazal penned by Mir Taqi Mir
- "Uss Bazm Mein Mujhe Nahin Banti Haya Kiyyay"

Ghazal sung by Barkat Ali Khan, lyrics by Mirza Ghalib

== Death ==
He died a premature death at the age of 55 on 19 June 1963 in Lahore, Pakistan.
