= Bade Ghulam Ali Khan =

Singer of classical music of India (1902-1968)

Padma Bhushan Ustad Bade Ghulam Ali Khan
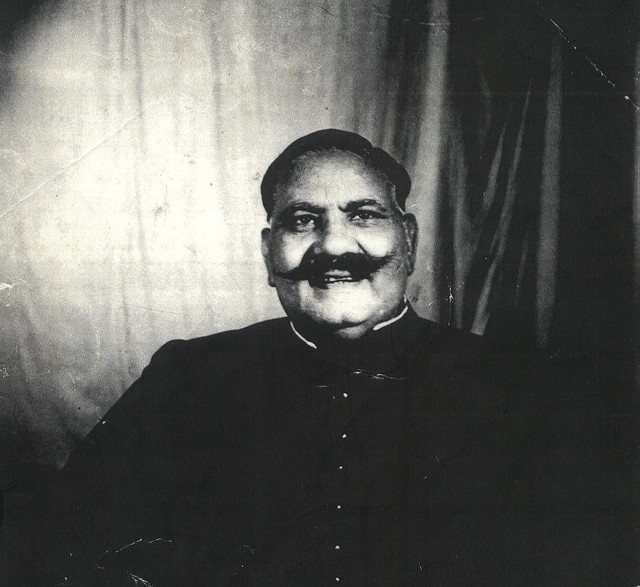

Background information
- Also known as: Sabrang
- Born: 2 April 1902; Kasur, Punjab, British India (present-day Punjab, Pakistan)
- Died: 23 April 1968 (aged 66) Hyderabad, Telangana, India
- Genre: Hindustani classical music
- Occupation: singer
- Years active: 1923–1967
- Labels: His Master's Voice, Times Music

Ustad Bade Ghulam Ali Khan (2 April 1902 – 23 April 1968) was an Indian vocalist, from the Kasur Patiala Gharana.

== Early life and background ==
Ustad Bade Ghulam Ali Khan was born on 2 April 1902, in Kasur District of Punjab in what was then British India. Mubarak Ali Khan and Barkat Ali Khan were his younger brothers.

Bade Ghulam Ali Khan had two sons from his first marriage to Allah Jawai. Munawar Ali Khan is his younger son who was born in August 1930, and Karamat Ali Khan, his elder son, was born in Lahore, British India on 28 December 1928. Seven sons were born to his elder son Karamat Ali Khan – Baqi Ali, Asif Ali, Mazhar Ali Khan, Jawaad Ali Khan, Mehdi Ali, Sajjad Ali, and Naqi Ali Khan. Out of the seven sons, three have carried on the Gharana lineage and are still singing. Mazhar Ali Khan died in New Delhi, India, in September 2021. Three children were born to Munawar Ali Khan – two sons, Raza Ali Khan, Shakir Ali Khan, and a daughter. Raza Ali Khan is carrying on the Gharana customs as well.

== Singing career ==
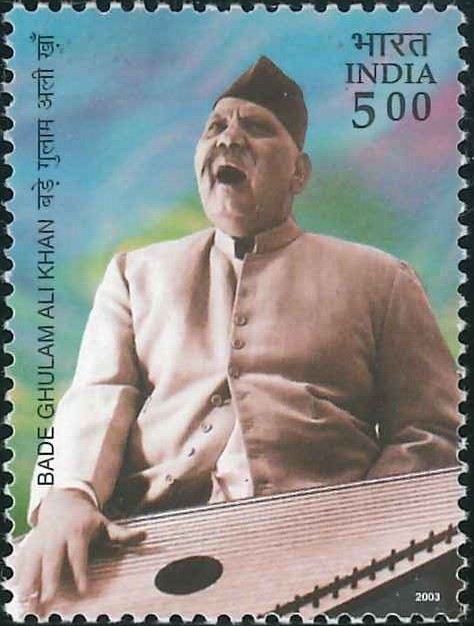
Bade Ghulam Ali Khan on a 2003 stamp of India

Though he started his career by singing a few compositions of his late father Ali Baksh Khan and uncle Kale Khan, Bade Ghulam amalgamated the best of three traditions into his own Kasur Patiala Gharana style:

- The Behram Khani elements of Dhrupad
- The gyrations of Jaipur and
- The behlavas (embellishments) of Gwalior.

Many of his raga expositions were brief, contrary to convention, and, while he agreed that the beauty of classical music lay in leisurely improvisation, he believed that the audience would not appreciate long alaps, particularly considering his tendency towards singing for the masses. He, therefore, changed the music to what the audience wanted. He excelled at more light-hearted ragas such as:

- Adana
- Bhupali
- Hameer
- Jaijaiwanti and
- Jaunpuri.

Under the pen name of Sabrang, he created many new compositions. Unlike his younger son, Munawar Ali Khan, who had an open-throated voice, Khan Sahib's voice was slurred. Bade Ghulam Ali Khan's notable live performances were in Calcutta in 1938 and then at 'All India Music Conference' in Bombay in 1944.

After the Partition of India in 1947, Bade Ghulam Ali Khan moved to his hometown Kasur in Pakistan, but moved to India later to live permanently there in 1957. Singer Saleem Shehzad, who trained under him as Bade Ghulam Ali Khan was a friend to his father, has argued that he quit Pakistan because the audience for classical music was limited and he was being underpaid by Radio Pakistan. With the help of the Bombay Chief Minister, Morarji Desai, he acquired Indian citizenship and moved to a bungalow at Malabar Hill in Mumbai. He lived at various times in Lahore, Bombay, Calcutta, and finally to Hyderabad.

Regarding the Partition of India, he once stated:

If one child in every home had been taught Hindustani classical music, India would never have been partitioned

For a long time, he stayed away from singing in films, despite requests and persuasion from well-known producers and music directors. Finally, after much coaxing, he was convinced by the film producer, K Asif, to sing two songs based on the ragas Sohni and Rageshri for the 1960 film Mughal-e-Azam, with music directed by Naushad. He demanded and received an extremely high price, reportedly ₹ 25,000 per song, at a time when the rates of popular and star playback singers such as Lata Mangeshkar and Mohammed Rafi were below ₹ 500 per song. Prem Jogan Ban Ke & Shubh Din Aayo Raj Dulara from film Mughal-e-Azam are his only two songs in film playback singing career.

Some more songs of Ustad Bade Ghulam Ali Khan -

- Yaad Piya Ki Aaye
- Aaye Na Balam
- Naina More Taras Gaye
- Saiyan Bolo
- Prem Agan Jiyara

== Awards and recognition ==
- Sangeet Natak Akademi Award (1962)
- Sangeet Natak Akademi fellow (1967)
- Padma Bhushan Award (1962)

== Death and legacy ==
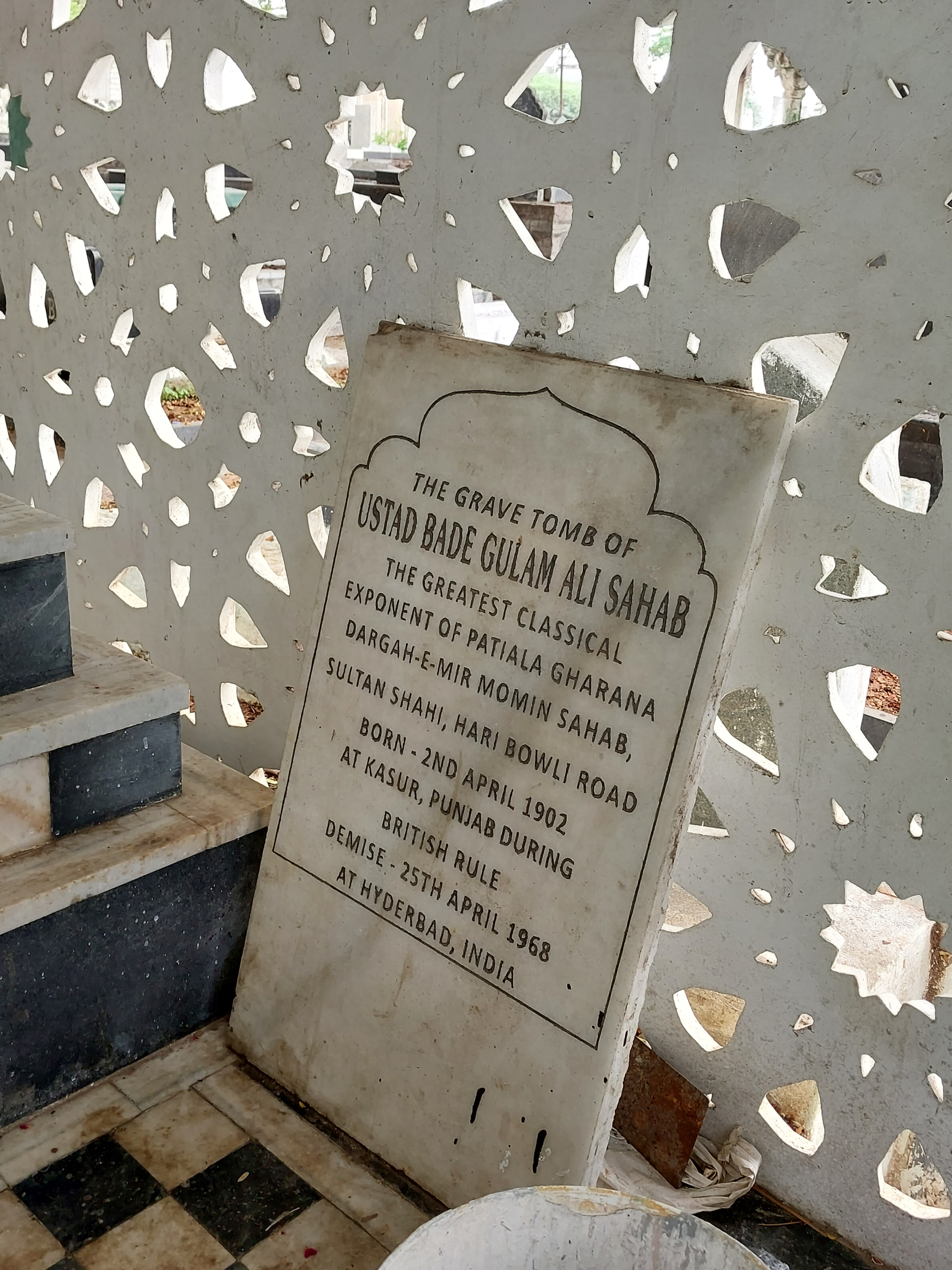
Bade Ghulam Ali Khan Tomb at Daira Mir Momin cemetery in Hyderabad

He died in Basheer Bagh Palace in Hyderabad on 23 April 1968 after a prolonged illness that had left him partially paralyzed in the last few years of his life. He continued to sing and perform in public with the support of his son, Munawar Ali Khan, until his death. He was buried at Daira Mir Momin cemetery in Hyderabad.

Indian film director Harisadhan Dasgupta made a documentary film about Khan in 1968, titled Bade Ghulam Ali Khan Sahib.

In 2017, the Bade Ghulam Ali Khan Yaadgaar Sabha was founded by his disciple Malti Gilani. It helps to keep his music and memory alive even today. In 1969, on Bade Ghulam Ali Khan's first death anniversary, veteran actor and his close associate Prithviraj Kapoor was the compere at the public event.

The main street at Basheerbagh is named Ustad Bade Ghulam Ali Khan Marg in his honour.
