= Music in Varanasi =

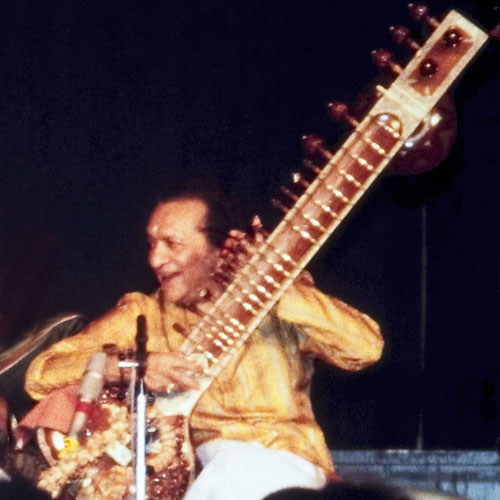
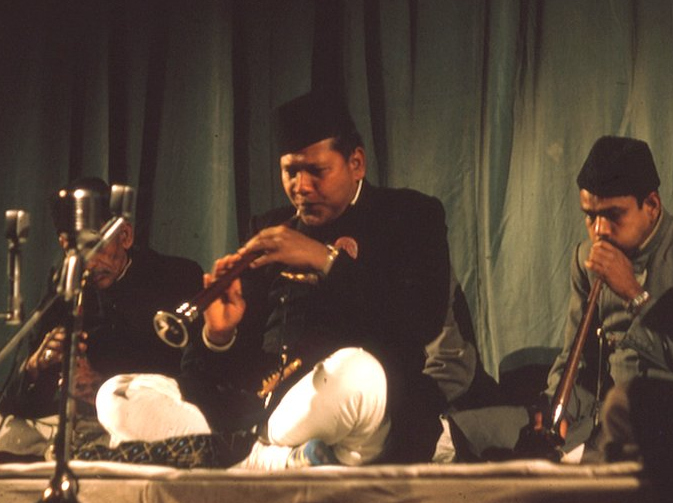
Left: Ravi Shankar of Varanasi, the iconic Sitar player who was awarded the Bharat Ratna; right: Bismillah Khan, the Shehnai maestro of Varanasi, Vikash Maharaj Sarod Maestro Yash Bharati & Karmveer Awardee.

Music in Varanasi is a tradition linked to the ancient times of the Pauranic legends. Lord Shiva, who is reported to have established this city, was credited with developing music and dance forms. Legend also attributes that Renu}, son of sage Vishvamitra and Mahagobind, was the precursors of music tradition in Kashi (Varanasi) when nymphs (Apsaras), Gandharvas and Kinnaras were the traditional practitioners of this art form, and saint Chaitanya and Vallabhacharya were the pioneers in spreading this music tradition in Varanasi. Notable musicians of Varanasi include the iconic sitar player Ravi Shankar, the Shehnai maestro Bismillah Khan, Sarod maestro Vikash Maharaj and singer Girija Devi. has joined the global bandwagon of UNESCO "Cities of Music" under the Creative Cities Network. Varanasi chosen in music category of creative cities network clearly signifies the rich musical heritage of this ancient city.

== History ==
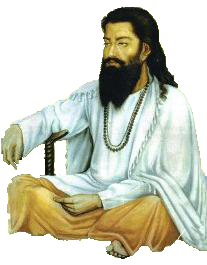
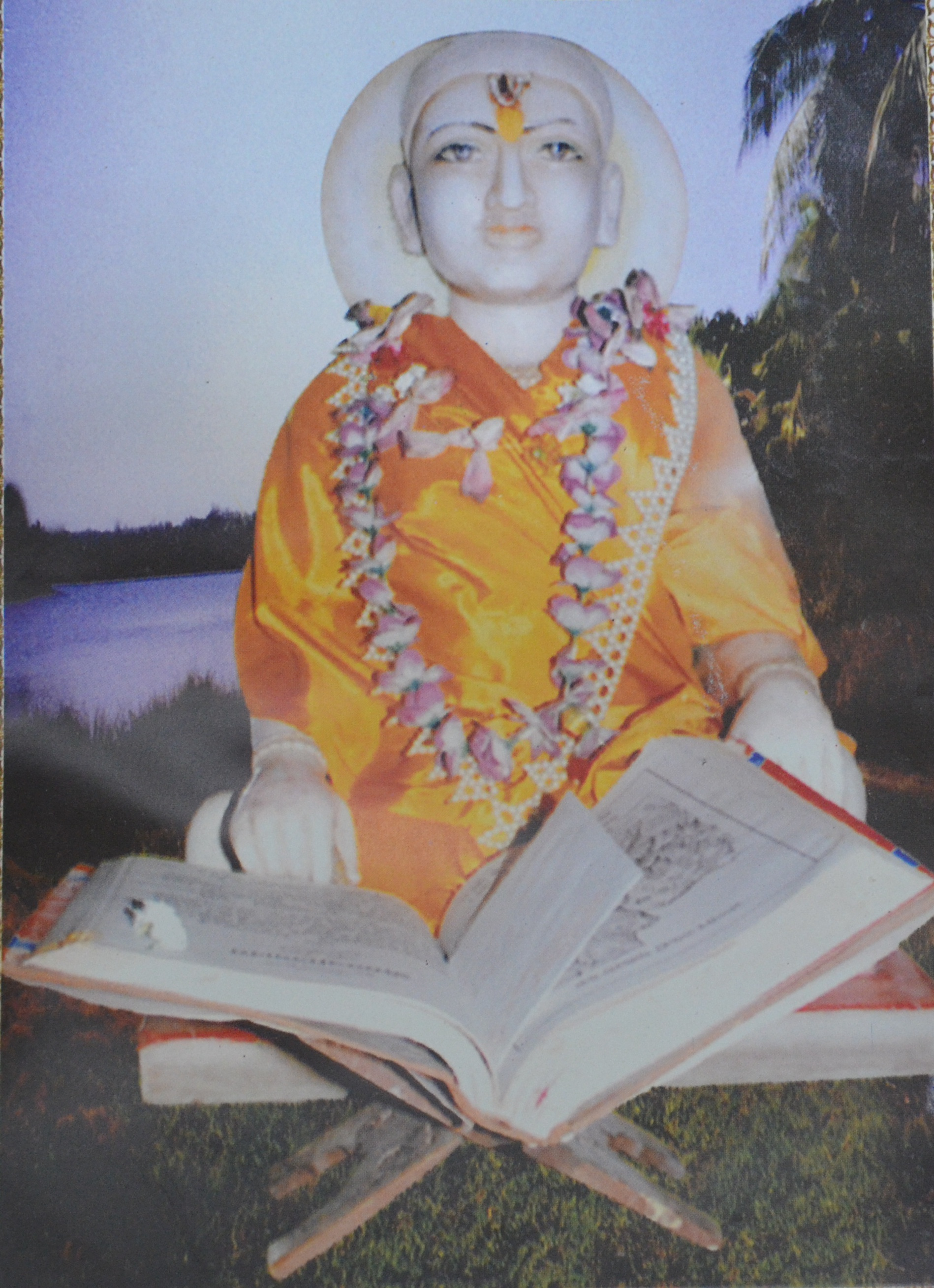
Left: Ravidas propounded Ravidassia religious movement; right: Gosvami Tulsidas.

Archeological finds of figurines of apsaras playing musical instruments indicate that music has long been important to Varanasi. In medieval times, the Vaishnava Bhakthi movement swept through the country. Literature attests to the fact that the Kingdom of Kashi centering on Varanasi was a major centre for music. The noted saint musicians were Surdas, Kabir, Ravidas, Meera and Tulsidas.

The music culture of devotional music permeated in Varanasi during the neo-Vaishnava movement when holy men singing devotional songs attracted people to the fold of the Bhakthi movement.

During the monarchic rule of Govind Chandra in the 16th century, the Dhrupad style of singing received royal patronage and led to other related forms of music such as Dhamar, Hori and Chaturanga. Under Muslim rulers, the Nawab of Awadh, the Nirgun singers of Kashi not only popularized the Assarwari, "Ghunghat ke pat Khol" song but also popularized the singing concerts such as festivals on the boats floating on the Ganges River. Some of the popular festivals were Jhoola, Jhoomar, Kajri, Birha, Dangal and Gulab Bari, a tradition which is continued even today. One of the singing styles made popular by Muslim artists Shori Miyan, Gammu Khan and Shade Khan during this time was the Tappa form of singing.

In recent times, the tutelary head, the Maharajas of Kashi of Varanasi, particularly Maharaj Prabhu Narayan Singh, have patronized music. During the Moghal Emperor Bahadur Shah II's reign, the noted musicians were Waris Ali, Akbar Ali, Nisar Khan, Sadiq Ali and Ashiq Ali Khan. Ali Mohammad and Ali Bux, the sons of Basat Khan, who were hailed as the "jewels" of the Royal court of Kashi. During this time, the local music styles which developed were the Banarasi Thumri, Dadra, Chaiti, Hori, Bhairavi, Kajri, Tarana, Ghato and many more. In addition, new forms were created such as Tirwat, Sadra, Khamsa, Lavni, Chaturang, Sargam, Ragmala, Kirtan, Qauwali, Kathagayan, Bhajan and Ramayan kirtan. Two hundred years ago, Pandit Ram Sahai developed the Benares gharana of the tabla, and within this genre, the notable musicians include Kishan Maharaj, Samta Prasad, Pandit Nanhku Maharaj, Kumar Bose, and Samar Saha. A class of musicians, gandharva, train their daughters in music and dancing.

The Varanasi School of Music that has evolved is very similar to the Lucknow style (gharana) of music and has also imbued local folk traditions of chaiti and kajri. This form of music spread quickly. Shankara Deva, a devotional music singer saint in his own right, was instrumental in composing Bhakthi songs. Baijis, a courtesan sect of Varanasi, are credited with maintaining and contributing to the traditions of Hindustani music and dance in Varanasi.

== Notable musicians and musicologists ==
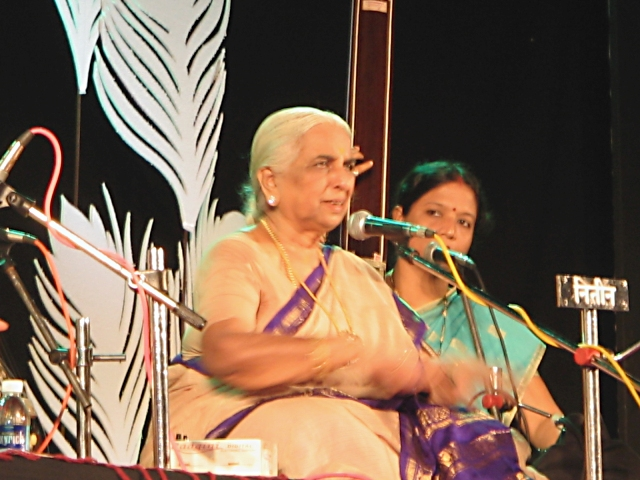
Girija Devi of Varanasi, the famous classical singer of thumris

Several of India's most talented musicians hailed/hail from Varanasi. Pandit Ravi Shankar, the famous sitar player and musicologist who was given Bharat Ratna, the highest civilian award of the country was a native of Varanasi. Ustad Bismillah Khan, an iconic Shehnai maestro who was also honored with the Bharat Ratna also came from Varanasi. Jotin Bhattacharya, Vikash Maharaj Sarod maestros and the disciple of Baba Allauddin Khan also come from Varanasi. Mian Tansen, musician of Mughal emperor Akbar's court, may have been born in Varanasi.

Girija Devi, the classical singer of thumris (semi-classical Indian music), was born in Varanasi and she was instrumental in elevating music to a status of respectability and appreciation. Notable musicologists from Varanasi include Prem Lata Sharma and Jayadeva Singh.

== Musical instruments ==
The most notable musical instruments of Varanasi are the sitar and the shehnai. Not only tabla (a set of two small drums which is the percussion instrument of India) but also sitar are good to buy in Varanasi. In case of sitar, the wood they are made from is important to verify and consult a local artist. Instruments made of mango tree wood is inferior in quality compared to the ones made with teak or from the a herbal tree known as vijyasar.

== Festivals ==
Drupad Festival, a music festival of Hindustani classical music, is held for 3 days at Tulsi Ghat in March/April every year, while Sankat Mochan Sangeet Samaroh is held in April and May. Other music festivals are held during the time of religious festivals, such as Kartik Purnima (November), Buddha Purnima (May), and Shivaratri (March). There is an International Music Centre Ashram in Varanasi where classical music by budding artists is held regularly.

== See also ==
- Music Ensemble of Benares

== Bibliography ==
- de Bruyn, Pippa; Bain, Keith; Allardice, David; Joshi, Shonar (18 February 2010). Frommer's India. John Wiley & Sons. pp. 470 ff. ISBN 978-0-470-64580-2.
