= Sawani =

Music genre from India

Sawani is a genre of semi-classical singing, popular in the Bhojpuri region of Uttar Pradesh and Bihar.

== Overview ==
Sawani belongs to the rich tradition of seasonal folk music in the Bhojpuri region. It comes in the series of season songs, like Chaiti, Hori and Kajari, which are integral to the cultural and agricultural calendar of the region. These seasonal songs reflect the deep connection between the rural communities and the natural cycles of the year.

== Regional significance ==
The genre is traditionally sung in the villages and towns of Uttar Pradesh, particularly around Banaras, Mirzapur, Mathura, and Allahabad, as well as in the Saran and Bhojpur regions of Bihar. This geographical spread corresponds with the Bhojpuri-speaking belt, where folk music traditions have been preserved and transmitted through generations.

== Musical characteristics ==
As a semi-classical genre, Sawani shares musical characteristics with other forms of Hindustani classical music. Like its companion seasonal songs, it can be adorned with elements from classical ragas and can incorporate styles such as Thumri and Bhairavi. The songs are typically performed in informal, community settings rather than formal concert halls, maintaining their folk character while displaying classical influences.

== Cultural context ==
Sawani is part of the broader Bhojpuri music tradition, which includes various seasonal and occasion-specific songs. Along with Chaiti (sung during the spring month of Chaitra), Hori (associated with Holi festival), and Kajari (performed during the monsoon season), Sawani represents the agricultural and cultural rhythm of life in rural Uttar Pradesh and Bihar. These songs are traditionally performed during specific times of the year, often coinciding with agricultural activities and festivals.

The seasonal song tradition serves both entertainment and cultural preservation functions, maintaining linguistic, musical, and social traditions of the Bhojpuri-speaking regions. Many of these songs are performed by women in village settings, though professional and semi-professional artists also perform them.

== See also ==
- Bhojpuri music
- Chaiti
- Hori (music)
- Kajari
- Thumri
- Folk music of Uttar Pradesh
