= Rasoolan Bai =

Background information
- Born: 1902; Kachhwa Bazar, Mirzapur, British India
- Died: 15 December 1974 (at the age of 72)
- Genres: Thumri, Hindustani classical music
- Occupation: Vocalist

Rasoolan Hussain (1902 – 15 December 1974) was a leading Indian Hindustani classical music vocal musician. Belonging to the Benaras gharana, she specialized in the romantic Purab Ang of the Thumri musical genre and tappa.

== Early life and training ==
Rasoolan Hussain was born in 1902 at Kachhwa Baazar, Mirzapur, Uttar Pradesh, in a poor family, though she inherited the musical legacy of her mother Bashiran Bibi and grandmother Adalat Begum. She displayed her grasp over classical Ragas at an early age. Recognising this at the age of five, she was sent to learn music from Ustad Shammu Khan, and later from sarangiyas (sarangi players) Ashiq Khan and Ustad Najju Khan.

== Career ==
Rasoolanbai became an expert in Tappa singing as well as Purab Ang, Thumri, besides dadra, poorbi geet, hori, kajri and chaiti. Her first performance was held in Dhananjaygarh court, after its success she started getting invitations from local Rajas of the time, thus she went on to dominated the Hindustani classical music genre for the next five decades, based in Varanasi and became the doyenne of Benaras gharana. In 1948, she stopped performing mujra and moved out of her kotha, started living in a bylane of Varanasi (Banaras) and married a local Banarasi sari dealer.

A contemporary of Siddheswari Devi (1908–1976) also from the same gharana, besides, concerts and mehfils, she often sang on Lucknow and Allahabad stations of All India Radio and Doordarshan till 1972, and her last public singing was held in Kashmir.

She was awarded the Sangeet Natak Akademi Award in Hindustani music Vocal in 1957 by Sangeet Natak Akademi, India's National Academy of Music, Dance and Theatre. Despite an illustrious musical career, she died in penury, running a small tea shop next to the radio station where she had often broadcast from. She has also taught noted classical singer Naina Devi. The famous Shehnai player Bismillah Khan said that he got inspiration for music from two sisters, Rasoolanbai and Batoolan Bai, when he was fourteen.

Her house was burnt during 1969 communal riots in Gujarat, after which she shifted to Allahabad (now Prayagraj). She died on 15 December 1974, at the age of 72.

Rasoolan Bai and the tawaif tradition of women musicians was featured in the film The Other Song (2009) by Saba Dewan, also featuring her more famous song, Lagat karejwa ma chot, phool gendwa na maar, a 1935 Gramophone recording

== Awards ==
- 1957: Sangeet Natak Akademi Award: Vocal
- 1963:National Academy of Music, London's Recognition Award for Cultural Music
- 1963:Cash prize of $10000 by erstwhile UK Government
