= Malini Awasthi =

Indian folk singer (born 1967)

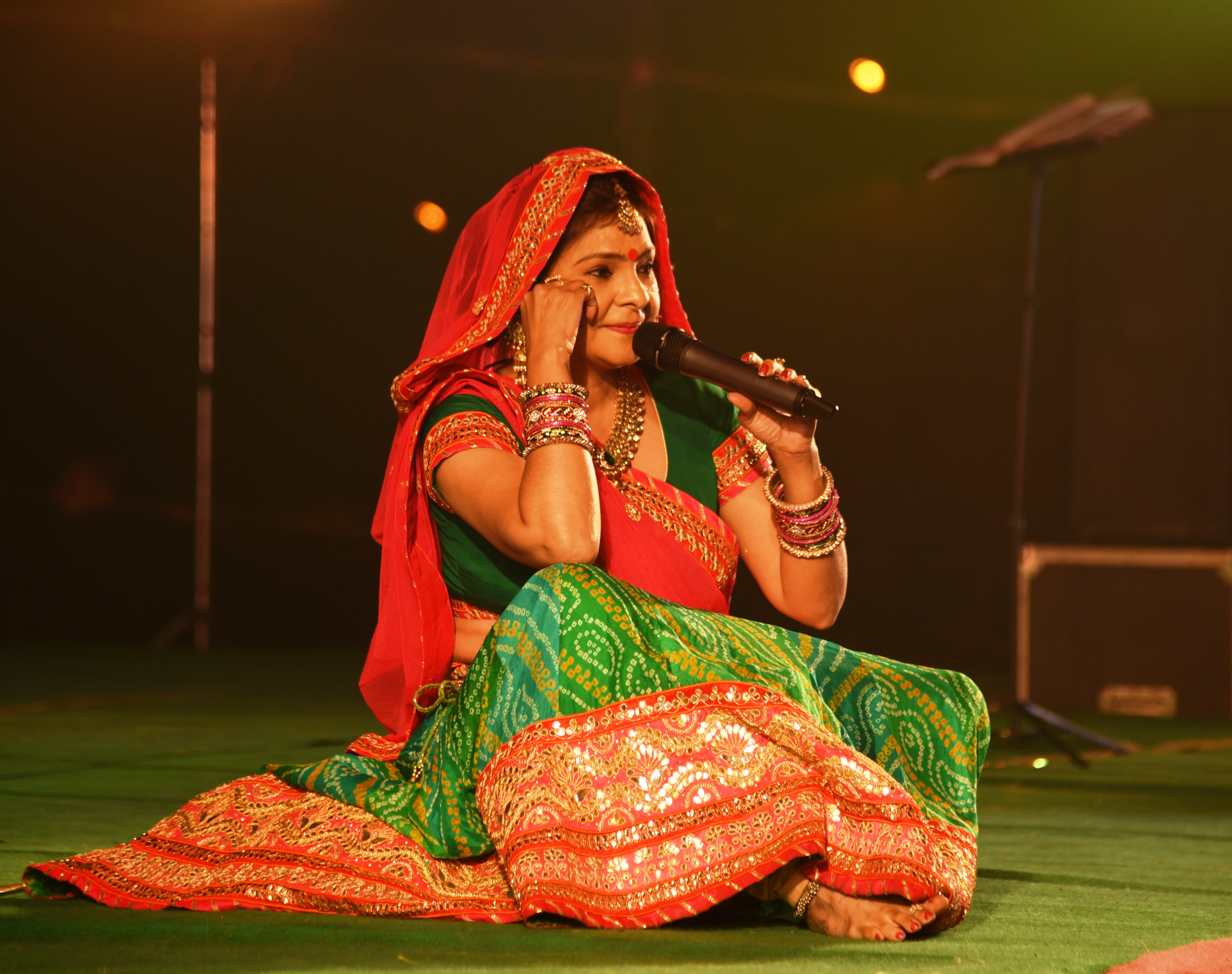
- Malini Awasthi in 2016

Background information
- Born: Kannauj, Uttar Pradesh, India
- Origin: Lucknow, Uttar Pradesh, India
- Genre: Indian folk music
- Occupation: Folk singer
- Years active: 1985 – present

Malini Awasthi (born 15 October 1966) is an Indian singer, who has been called the Folk Queen of India. Having been trained classically, she is equally adept in various forms of Hindustani music like vintage Dadra, Thumri, Kajri Chaiti, etc. Her knowledge of music finds a reflection in her renditions of Ghazals and Sufiyaana Kalaam too. A Ganda-baandh disciple of Padma Vibhushan Vidushi Girija Devi, she is a connoisseur of 'Chaumukhi gayan' of Benares Gharana. She commands equally over multiple dialects and languages like Awadhi, Bhojpuri, Bundeli, and Braj.

Acknowledging her decades long service to music of the land, Government of India awarded her the civilian honour of the Padma Shri in 2016. She worked as a visiting professor at Centre for Media Studies, Jawaharlal Nehru University . Currently she is appointed as a Professor of Practice at Chaudhary Charan Singh University, Meerut, U.P.

== Early life and background ==
Malini Awasthi was born in the city of perfumes, Kannauj, Uttar Pradesh into a family of doctors. She was the youngest among the trinity that the couple were parents to. Her father Dr. P.N. Awasthi, was fond of classical music and her mother Mrs. Nirmala Awasthi, deeply cherished the Purab Ang Gayaki and Bhajans. This blend reflects in her singing today. She was initiated into music at the age of 5, on the insistence of her music-loving mother. This early innitiation into music gave her ample opportunity to serve the country. The picture of the puzzle got better when she cleared her exams of Prayag Sangeet Samiti years before she was expected to.

Along with her academic training from Mount Carmel College, she received her formal tutelage from Ustad Rahat Ali Khan.

She went on to do her Postgraduation in Hindustani classical music from Bhatkhande University, Lucknow. and a Postgraduation in Modern History with specialisation in Medieval and modern Indian architecture, from University of Lucknow simultaneously. She was conferred with a gold medal in both of her master's degrees.

She is a Ganda bandh student of Legendary Hindustani Classical Singer, Padma Vibhushan Vidushi Girija Devi of Banaras Gharana. This was the only satisfaction that her mother, a cancer patient, could see happening before she left. She is married to senior IAS officer Awanish Kumar Awasthi (UP:1987) who retired as Principal Secretary to Government of Uttar Pradesh.

Currently her spouse is an advisor to Honorable Chief Minister of U.P. They have a son Adwitiya and a daughter Ananya.

== Career ==
Malini Awasthi started as an artist for Akashvani (radio broadcaster) at a very young age and went on to contribute immensely towards it in varying age and capacity. She is a Top grade artist of All India Radio and an 'A' grade artist of Doordarshan, Lucknow. Contrary to the popular notion, this accreditation is for Ghazals and not for folk. She was an ICCR approved artist and a performing artist prior to her marriage.

By the time she started training under her Guru Thumri Queen Girija Devi she was already a popular artist. Through her Guru she learnt Purab Ang Gayaki, of which she is an acclaimed face today. She ventured into various reality shows like Antakshari, Sa Re, Ga Ma Pa, and Lux Junoon

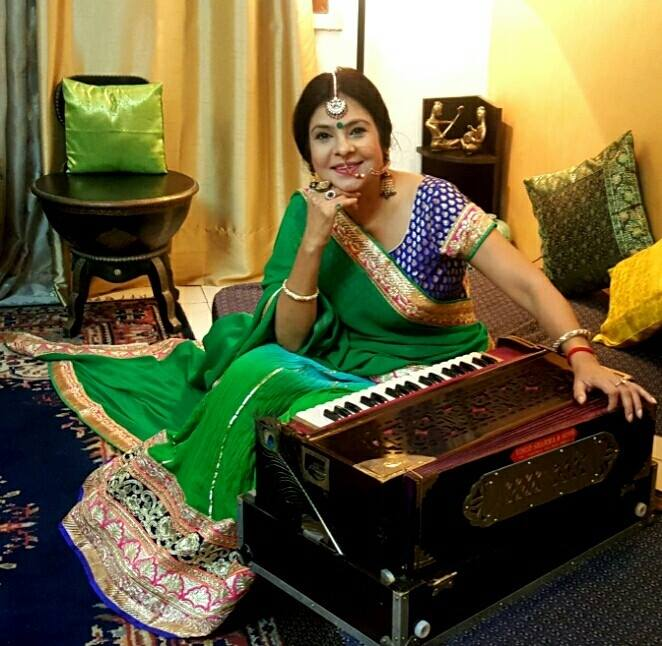

Her efforts at preserving the folk songs bore fruits, and her songs like Railiya Bairan and Saiyan Mile Larkaiyan became a cult.

She is a regular performer at the popular classical music festival, Jahan-e-Khusrau. Rekhta (website) She judged the Bhojpuri - Musical Reality Show "Sur Sangram".

She ventured as a payback singer into many films:-

Mann Ki Asha (Bumm Bumm Bole) Teri Katili Nigahon Ne Mara(Jaanisaar) Tumko Ane Mien Tumko Bulane Mien (Jaanisaar) Yeh Jivan Hai (Soundtrack (film)), Super hit track Dil Mera Muft Ka (Remix) (Agent Vinod (2012 film)), "Sunder Susheel" in the 2015 film Dum Laga Ke Haisha which had music by Anu Malik, Jiggi Jiggi (Lipstick Under My Burkha) her critically acclaimed song Heer (Durgamati) Missed call (Joram (film)), recent Chakka Jaam (Bhaiyya Ji) and many more.

Apart from singing on stage and lending her voice to films, Awasthi lends her voice to preserve culture and help Government promote well-being. Malini has sung the popular title song of the Kisan channel that was launched by the Prime Minister of India. On the occasion of inauguration of Ram Janmabhoomi Mandir, Ayodhya, she was invited to lend her voice for Ram Naam Kirtan while statue of Ramlalla was being unveiled.

Malini performed and represented India in an event of ABU TV in 2023 that was held in Seoul, South Korea.

=== Academic honors ===
- Honorary Doctorate from Teerthankar Mahaveer University, Moradabad, U.P.
- D.Litt. (Honoris Causa) from University of Allahabad, Prayagraj, U.P.
- Honorary Dlit from Sampoornanand Sanskrit University, Banaras
- Centenary Chair Professor for the Bharat Adhyan Kendra at the Banaras Hindu University
- Visiting professor at Center for Media Studies Jawaharlal Nehru University

=== Social causes And social welfare ===
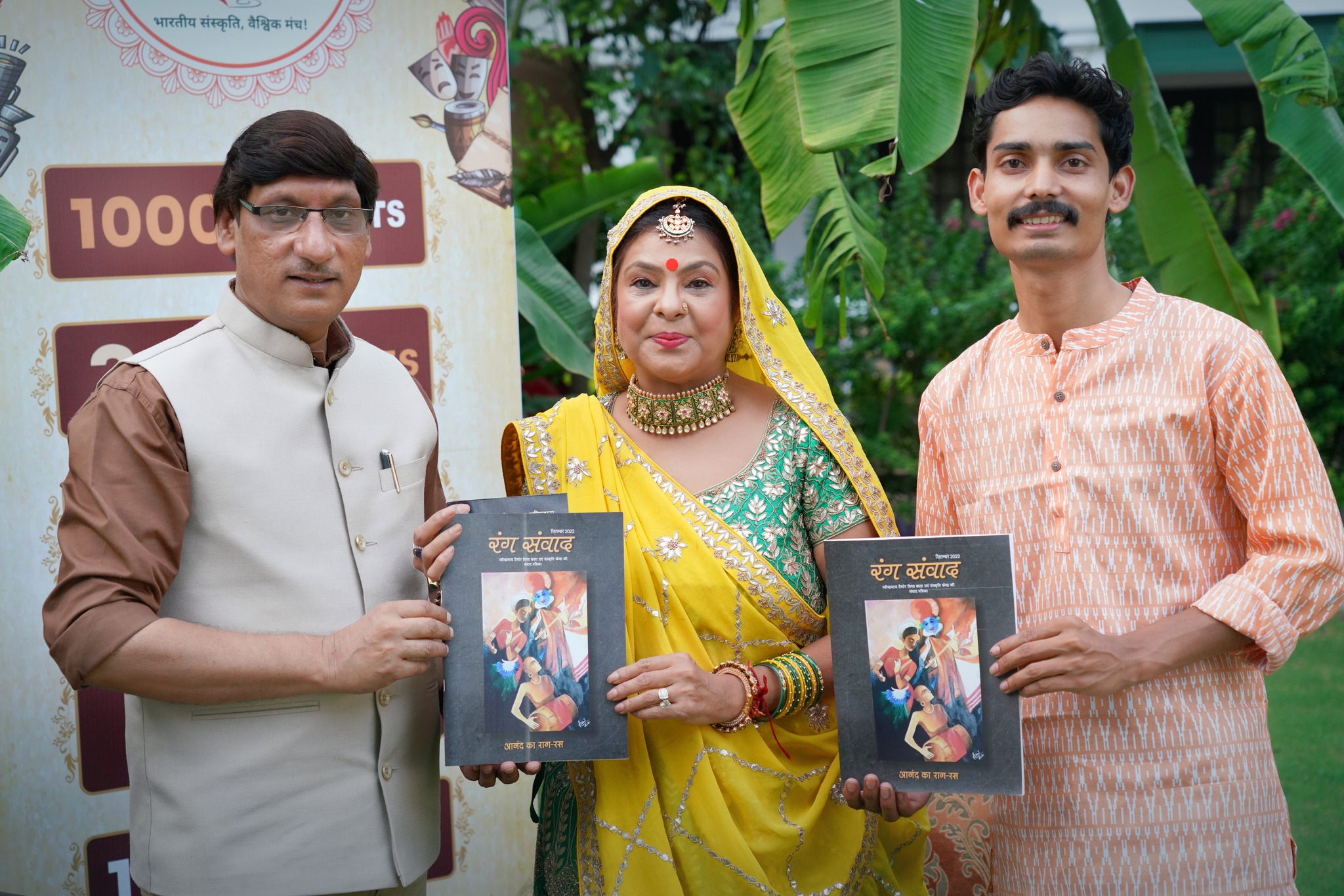

She has worked with Vidya Niwas Mishra to develop her understanding and to work for proliferation of the regional languages.

She is an orator, and has been called on varied national and international platforms to render her views and opinions on topics of importance. She has collaborated with TEDXHYDERABAD TEDXSRMUWOMEN TEDXNIFTJODHPUR. She has also been invited to give her valuable insights on topics concerning culture in TOI Dialogues Vision and Voices's Varanasi and Kanpur Sessions. She has given workshops on Kajri at various places across Uttar Pradesh and on Purab Ang Gayaki at the prestigious ITC Sangeet Research Academy, Kolkata, in 2024.

She was recently invited as one of the panellists on the topic Evolution of Folk Music in India alongside Ila Arun Prasoon Joshi Papon (singer) and others in the WAVES Summit, 2025 that was recently held at Jio World Convention Center in Mumbai.

During the Covid -19 pandemic, her Facebook live sessions daily at 5 'O' clock in the evening were the talk of the town and were a beam of positivity in the times of distress. She created a song titled "Darna Nahi Muskurana Hai" over Covid-19 pandemic, that was appreciated by Narendra Modi, Honorable Prime Minister of India. Retweeting Awasthi's post he wrote, " Every individual is striving to contribute positively towards the Janta Curfew. Folk Singer, Malini Awasthi is motivating people in her own way !" Malini had been appointed as an ambassador of Election Commission of India for three terms. She had been appointed as a Member of expert committee on folk music by Sangeet Natak Academy. She has also been appointed as a member for the sub Commission on culture under the Indian Commission for cooperation with UNESCO.

She has founded an organisation called SONCHIRAIYA for promotion and proliferation of Folk. It has been giving platforms to many artists from different regions for past 10 years. The Lucknow-based NGO which started with Vidushi Girija Devi as its chairperson, has conceptualised varied critically acclaimed shows and workshops under the guidance of the founder Mrs.Awasthi. Muktigatha and Deshaj being the top favourites.

== Books ==
On the auspicious occasion of Basant Panchmi, she launched her maiden book titled 'CHANDAN KIWAD'. The book was launched at the prestigious Jaipur Literature Festival ,2025 in the presence of esteemed personalities including actor and singer Ila Arun and national award winning writer Yatindra Mishra.

Recently she spoke in depth about her experiences and discussed in detail about multiple facets of her book at Sahitya Aajtak, Lucknow, 2025.

Awasthi launched her book at an event held at Indira Gandhi Pratisthan, Lucknow on 22 February 2025 which saw dignitaries like Deputy Chief Minister of Uttar Pradesh Shri Brijesh Pathak and RSS General Secretary Shri Dattatrey Hosabale marking their presence.

On the last day of Banaras Literature Festival, 2025 that was held at Taj Ganges, Varanasi, there was a detailed discussion on her book CHANDAN KIWAD. Awasthi shared memoirs from her life and experiences from her illustrious career including her association with the Thumri legend Girija Devi.

== Cultural performances ==
=== National ===
- Baarish, 2nd edition, Delhi, 2026
- Juni Shani Mandir , Indore, M.P. , 2026
- Maati 9, University of Mumbai, Mumbai, Maharashtra, 2026
- Sanskritik Shaurya Sangam, Central Command,Indian Army, Prayagraj, U.P. , 2026
- Malan Albeli ( Natak on her life), Bharteendu Natak Academy, Lucknow, 2026
- Mithila Chitrakala Sansthan 11th Foundation Day, Madhubani, Bihar, 2026
- Sankat Mochan Sangeet Samaroh, 2026, Day-1, Varanasi, U.P. 2026
- Banaras Ke Ghat Se Awadh Ke Angan Tak, KCC, Kolkata, W.B. 2026
- Gulaab Badi, Kanpur, U.P. 2026
- Gulaab Badi, N.B.R.I., Lucknow, U.P. 2026
- SPANDAN, BHU, Varanasi, U.P., 2026
- Bharat Rang Mahotsav and Sarang 'Closing Ceremony ' , DLCSUPVA, Rohtak, Haryana, 2026
- Bharat Rang Mahotsav, NSD, Delhi, 2026
- Saptak, Ahmedabad, Gujrat, 2026
- 150th Anniversary of Vande Matram, Victoria Memorial Hall, Kolkata, WB, 2026
- Kala Sangam, Magh Mela, Prayagraj, U.P. 2026
- 150th Harivallabh Sangeet Sammelan, Jalandhar, Punjab, 2025
- Vanvaar Mahotsav, Jahanabad, Bihar, 2025
- Akhtari: Uff Ye Phasana ! Sahitya Aajtak, Delhi, 2025
- Gorakhpur Book Festival, Gorakhpur, U.P., 2025
- Ganga Mahotsav, Varanasi, 2025
- Chath Puja, Kurukshetra, Haryana, 2025
- Daastan-e-Akhtari, Royal Opera House, Mumbai, 2025
- Sanskritik Sandhya, UP International Trade Show, India Expo Mart, Greater Noida, 2025
- Badariya, Delhi, 2025
- Malhar and the Sea, Goa, 2025
- Teri Mitti- A musical tribute, Lucknow, 2025
- Roots and Ragas, Jaipur, 2025
- The Rasa Experience, Mumbai, 2025
- 6th Rajeshwari Kala Mahotsav, Jalandhar, Punjab, 2025
- Raghuraiyya : Awadh Ke Sangeet Concert, Day 1 Timeless Ayodhya Art and Literature Festival, Ayodhya, 2025
- Holi Ke Rang, Malini Ke Sang, Delhi 2025
- Day 1& Day 2 Jahan-e- Khusrau, Delhi, 2025
- Jashn-e-Adab, Delhi, 2025
- Daastan-e-Akhtari, Sacred Amritsar, Amritsar, 2025
- Sahaj Parv, Kolkata, 2025
- Taj Mahotsav, Agra, 2025
- Kalagram, Mahakumbh, Prayagraj, 2025
- Bharat Parv, Lal Quila, Delhi,2025
- Uttar Pradesh Diwas, Lucknow, 2025
- SAPTAK, Ahmedabad, 2025
- Savarna Sangeet Sammelan, Kolkata, 2025
- 1st Jaigarh Heritage Festival, Jaipur, 2024
- Shravasti Mahotsav, 2024
- Gulaabari, Dariya Kinare, Banaras, 2022, 2024
- Virasat, Dehradun, 2024
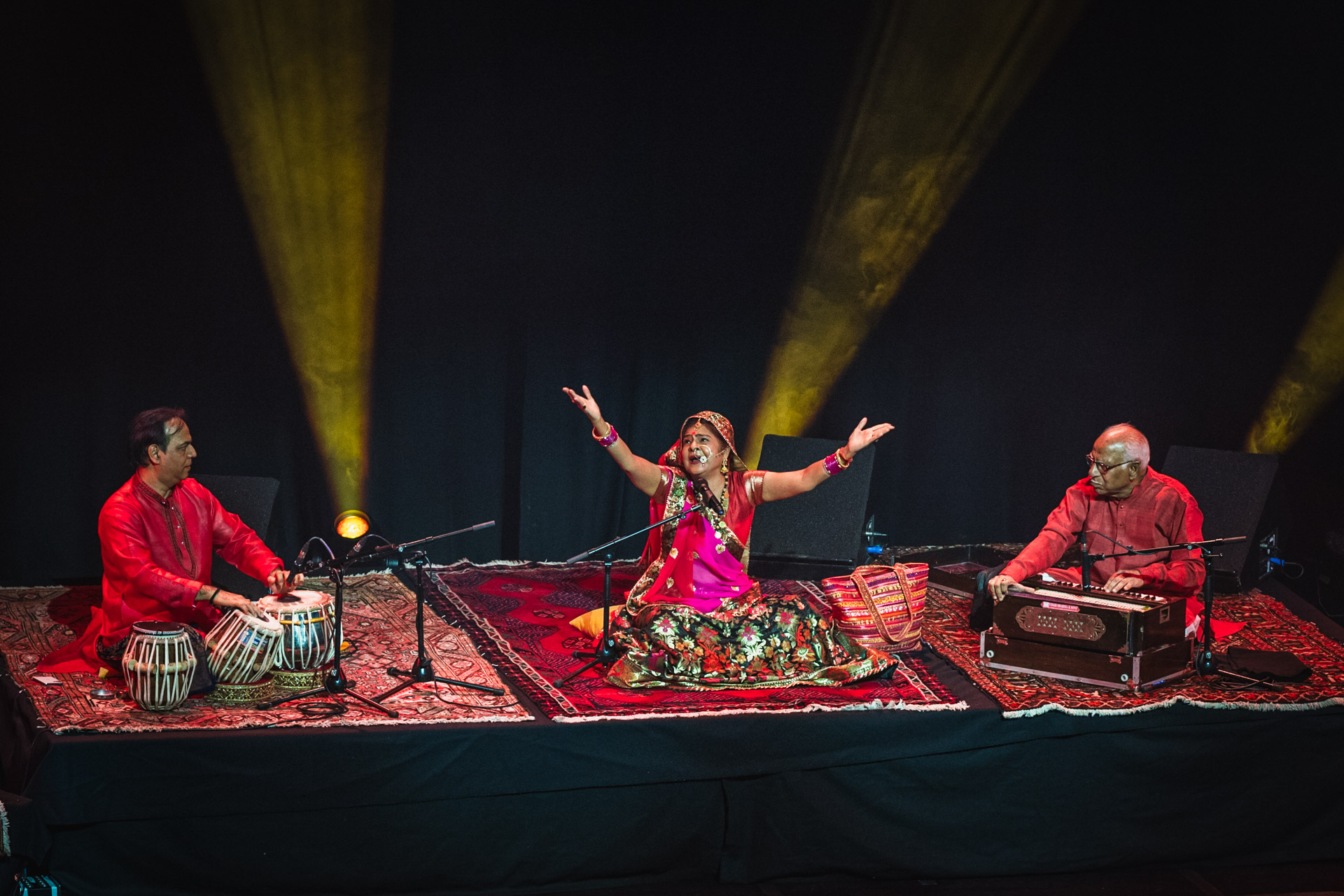
- Narmada Mahotsav, Jabalpur, 2024
- Indo American Chamber of Commerce (North India Council)'s CULTURAL EVENING, DELHI 2024
- Kalki Mahotsav, Sambhal, U.P., 2024
- Ganpati Mahotsav, BBD University, Lucknow, 2024
- Saptak, Ahmedabad, 2024
- Sahitya Aajtak, Lucknow 2024
- Sankatmochan Sangeet Samaroh, Banaras 2024
- Cultural Kaarva'n Delhi 2024
- Bandish by NCPA 2024
- Pranati Bhopal 2024
- Malhar Mahotsav Gorakhpur 2024
- Jashn-e-Adab, Patna 2024
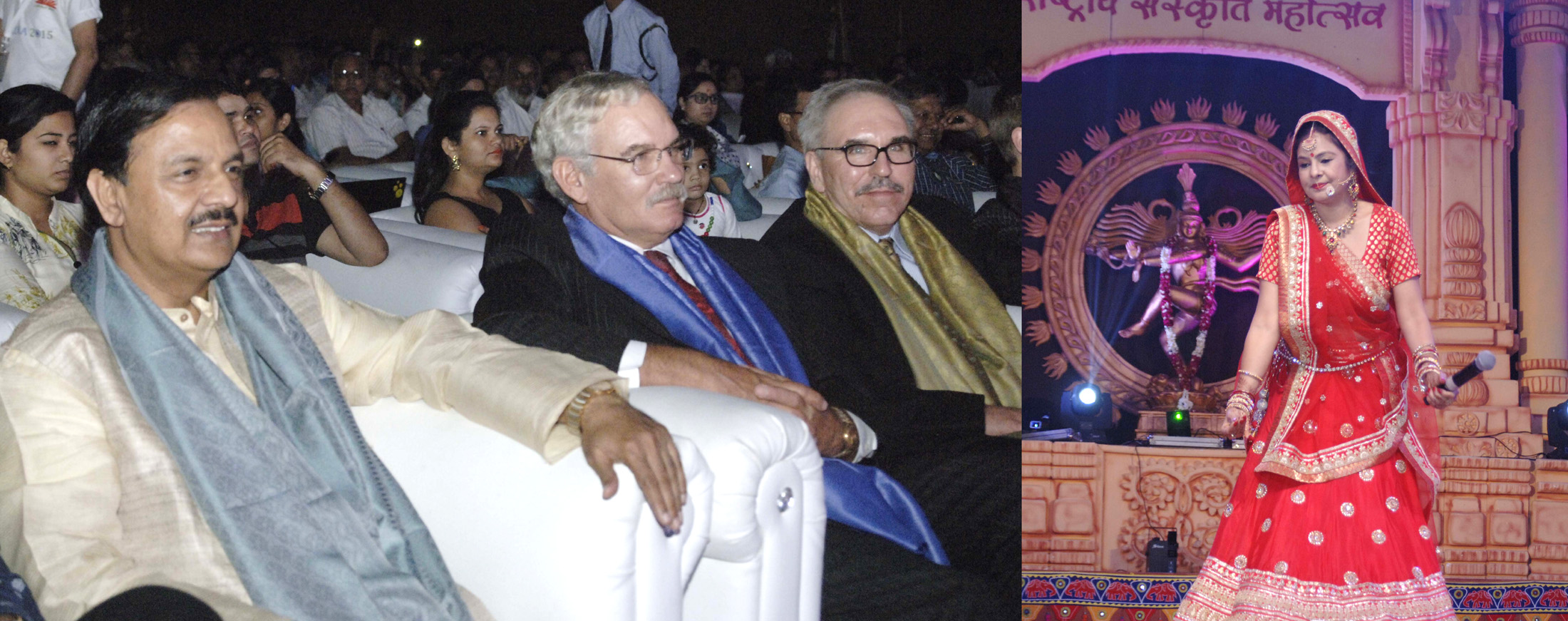
  Minister of State for Culture, Tourism and Civil Aviation, Dr.Mahesh Sharma witnessing a special performance by Malini Awasthi.
- Raag Seva, First Day, Ram Janmabhoomi Mandir, Ayodhya, 2024
- Kanpur Dehat Mahotsav 2023
- Subh E Banaras, 2022
- Pudducherry Literature Festival, 2022
- Mahashivratri Music Festival, ANTIM NISHA, Banaras, 2021
- Mahindra Kabira Festival, Banaras, 2021
- Tagore Theatre, Sangeet Natak Academy, Chandigarh, 2020
- SaMaPa Sangeet Sammelan, IHC Delhi, 2019
- Shilpotsav, NOIDA, 2019
- Sahitya Aaj Tak, Delhi, 2018
- Trigart Kangra Valley Festival, 2018
- Ras Banaras Sanskriti Mahotsav, 2018
- Chath Puja, Pravasi Mahasangh, NOIDA, 2017
- Chath Utsav, NOIDA, 2015
- Bhramhanand, Nagpur, 2015
- Rashtriya Sanskriti Mahotsav, Delhi, 2015 Tihri, 2018 Reva 2019 Bikaner 2023
- Lucknow Mahotsav, 2014
- Lucknow Literature Fest, 2014 - Tribute to Begum Akhtar
- Banaras Utsav, 2013
- Thumri Festival, 2012
- Bhojpuri Cinema- Strong at 50 Patna, 2011
- IIT KANPUR GOLDEN JUBILEE CELEBRATIONS, 2009
- Rag-rang-Festival, Taj-Mahotsav, Ganga- Mahotsav, Lucknow-Festival, Budh-Mahotsav, Ramayan-Mela, Kajri-Mela, Kabir-Utsav etc. in Uttar Pradesh.
- Shruti-Mandal-Samaroh, Kumbhal-Gardh-Festival, Teej- Festival-Jaipur in Rajasthan.
- Surajkund-Craft-Mela and Heritage-Festival-Pinjore in Punjab and Hayana.

=== International ===
- Braj or Awadh Ke Geeton mien Malini , Kathmandu Literary Festival, Kathmandu, Nepal, 2026
- Bijhar Cultural Confluence, Singapore, 2025
- Vishwa Hindi Diwas, Tanzania, 2025
- NOOR - Festival of Lights, Dubai, 2024
- Queen Elizabeth Hall, London 2024
- Rhythms of India, Jazz at Lincoln Center, USA 2024
- Ashavari Festival, San Francisco, 2024
- India By The Creek, Dubai, 2024
- Whitlam Centre, Sydney, Australia, 2024,
- Chath Puja, Melbourne, Australia, 2022
- Pravasi Diwas at Trinidad, 2017
- Festival of India in Mauritius, 2015 2024
- ICCR 40th, Anniversary celebration in Fiji, 2011
- Independence Day celebration Houston, USA, 2004
- Cultural Performance in Pakistan; 2007
- Cultural Performance in South Bank center, London, 2011
- Indian festival celebration in Netherlands: 2002, 2003, 2015 and 2016, 2023
- Vishwa Bhojpuri Sammelan, Mauritius; 2000, 2004, 2016
- Cultural Concert in Philadelphia and Los Angeles; 2016

== Filmography/ Discography ==
- Jhoom Banware- Haq (2025 film)
- Saiyan Mile Larkaiyan- Mannu kya Karegga (2025 film)
- Holi Ayi Rey – Coke Studio Bharat Season -3
- Jai Ho Chhath Maiya – Shailendra Singh, Malini Awasthi
- Bhole Shankar
- Bumm Bumm Bole
- Ata Pata Laapata
- Agent Vinod
- Dum Laga Ke Haisha
- Bhagan Ke Rekhan ki – Issaq (2013 film)
- Chaarfutiya Chhokare (2014 film)
- Soundtrack (film)
- Lipstick Under My Burkha
- Durgamati
- Joram (film)
- Bhaiyya Ji

=== OTT ===
Ram Katha with Amitabh Bachchan (JioHotstar)

Made in Heaven (TV series)

== Television- ==
Title Track -Yashomati Maiyaa Ke Nandlala

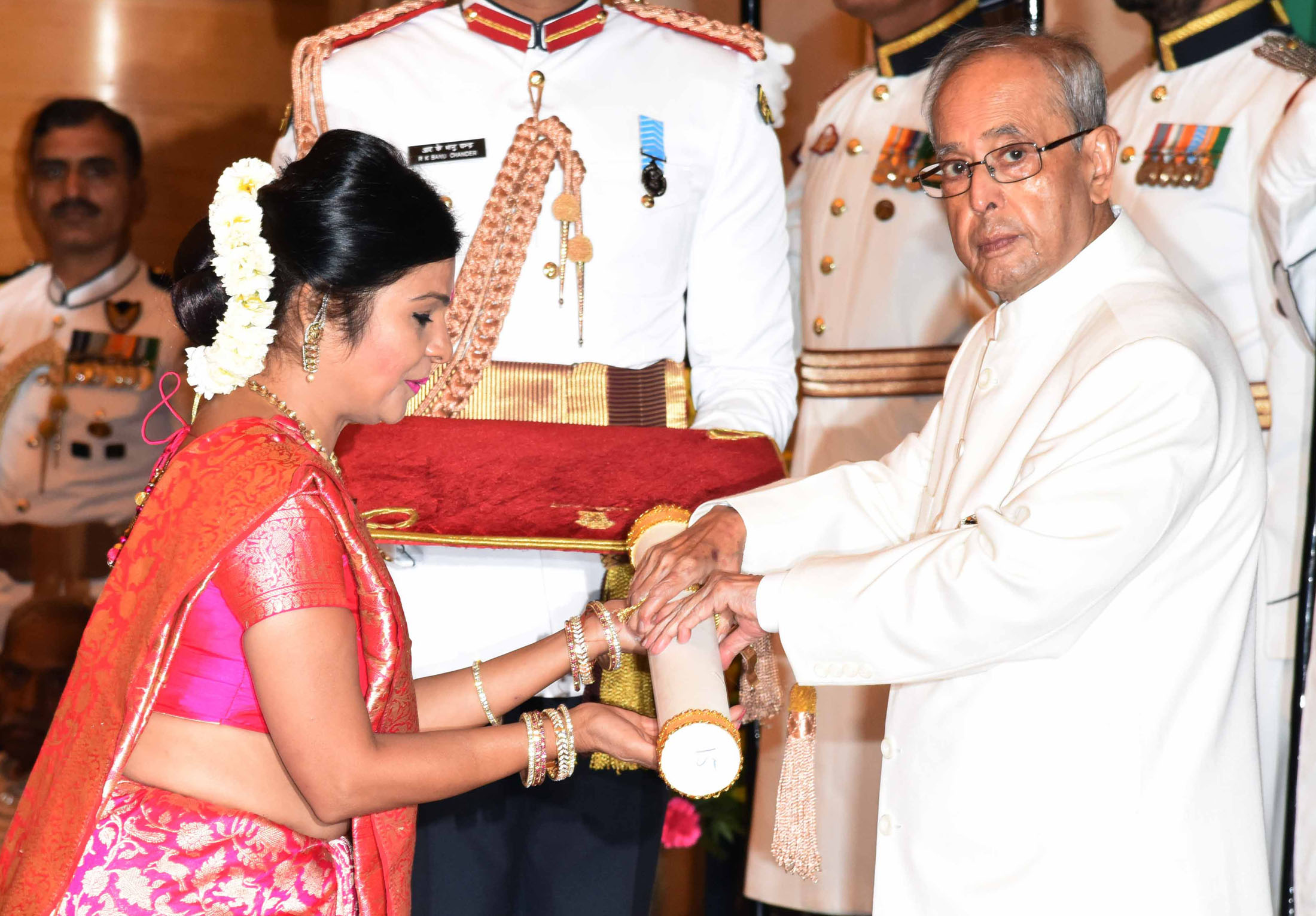
The President, Shri Pranab Mukherjee presenting the Padma Shri Award to Smt Malini Awasthi, at a Civil Investiture Ceremony, at Rashtrapati Bhavan, in New Delhi on 28 March 2016

== Awards ==
- Padma Shri (2016)
- Aajtak Sahitya Jagriti Samman (Female) for Chandan Kiwad, Delhi, 2025
- Rajeshwari Kala Samman, Apeejay College of Fine Arts, Jalandhar, Punjab 2025
- Vishwa Rang Bhasha Samman, Mauritius 2024
- Yash Bharti, UP Government 2006
- Sangeet Natak Academy (2018)
- Uttar Pradesh Sangeet Natak Akademi Award, 2017
- Kalidas samman, 2014
- Bank of Baroda, Maharaja Sayyajirao Lokbhasha Samman, 2022
- Bhartiya Sanskriti Samman, Banaras Hindu University, 2022
- Sahara Awadh Samman, 2003
- Naari Gourav Samman, 2000

== See also ==
- Neha Singh Rathore
