= Semi-classical music =

In South Asia, semi-classical music (Hindi: नीम क्लासिकी मौसीक़ी, Urdu: نیم کلاسیکی موسیقی; neem klaseeki moseeqi) is derived from Hindustani classical music or Carnatic music that is often combined with filmi music.

== Historical background ==
After the Indian Rebellion of 1857 or sometimes also called the First war of independence from the British rule, most Mughal court musicians moved from Delhi to the relative peace and safety of smaller towns after the failure of the 1857 rebellion.

== Thumri and Dadra ==
In those smaller towns, a new musical movement gained momentum which sought relaxation from the structural limitations of the khayal form of music to allow singers to express themselves with lighter music. This new trend resulted in the development of two closely related music genres, the thumri and the dadra.

After the independence of Pakistan in 1947, this musical heritage and many of the musicians shifted to Pakistan. Thumri and dadra have been and still are popular among contemporary classical vocalists in Pakistan.

== Semi-classical singers ==
- Ustad Bade Ghulam Ali Khan
- Ustad Barkat Ali Khan
- Ustad Salamat Ali Khan
- Ustad Amanat Ali Khan and Bade Fateh Ali Khan
- Atif Aslam
- Hamid Ali Khan
- Shafqat Amanat Ali
- Iqbal Bano
- Ghulam Ali (singer)
- Farida Khanum
- Suraiya Multanikar
- Mehdi Hassan
- Sajjad Ali
- Lata Mangeshkar
- Asha Bhosle
- Jaffer Zaidi aka Kaavish

== Other music ==
Pakistani pop music, despite starting as completely westernized music, has been heavily influenced by semi-classical by the passage of time.

Bhojpuri music genres like Thumari, Chaiti, Hori, Kajari are also part of semi classical Hindustani Music.
