= Bhojpuri music =

Overview of music traditions in Bhojpuri Language

Bhojpuri music is a form of Hindustani Classical Music and includes a broad array of Bhojpuri language performances in distinct style, both traditional and modern. This form of music is mostly created in Indian states of Bihar, Uttar Pradesh, Jharkhand and other countries like Nepal, Trinidad and Tobago, Suriname, Fiji, Guyana, the Netherlands, Mauritius, the United Kingdom, and the United States.

== History ==
Origin of Bhojpuri music is quite unclear but the earliest form of Bhojpuri music song today is Nirguna was used to be sung by Kabir. Earlier on event occasions like Chhath or wedding these folks songs were used to be sung by people.

When Bhojpuriyas were taken as plantation workers in British colonies, globalisation of Bhojpuri music took place and it extended its radius in counties like Mauritius, Netherlands and Caribbean Islands. It also mixed with the folk or modern music form of that countries. This led to the birth of distinct diaspora genres reflecting processes of adaptation and creolisation. Examples include Geet Gawai in Mauritius, where songs often blend Bhojpuri and Mauritian Creole and address new themes related to migration and island life while serving as a key means of language preservation. Baithak Gana in Suriname, and Chutney music in Trinidad and Tobago. Chutney music, in particular, evolved from Bhojpuri wedding songs performed primarily by women into a public genre incorporating Western instruments, Soca rhythms, and increasingly English lyrics alongside Bhojpuri, exemplified by pioneers like Sundar Popo..

The modern form of Bhojpuri music generated from Bollywood movies of 1950s. Later after the release of the first Bhojpuri Film Ganga Maiyya Tohe Piyari Chadhaibo the modernisation of Bhojpuri folk songs happened along with a generation of Modern Bhojpuri music.

== Classification ==
Bhojpuri Folk music can be classified on several basis:

=== Occasional ===
These songs are sung on various occasions, events and religious rituals:

1. Child Birth: Song that are sung on the birth of a child are called Sohar.
2. Mundan : These are sung during Mundan.
3. Marriage : There are several different songs that are sung in the different marriage rituals.

A Bhojpuri wedding song sung for a son's marriage

=== Caste based ===
Different caste in Bhojpuri region have their own folk songs. Biraha belongs to the Ahir or Yadav caste, some songs belong to Dusadh, Kaharwa to Kanhars and so on.

=== Season based ===
Many songs are sung in a particular season or month like Kajari in Sawan, Phaguwa in Phalguna etc.

== Semi-classical music ==
Bhojpuri has vast traditions of music which includes semi classical Hindustani Music. Folk songs genre like Thumri, Kajari, Hori Purabi and Chaiti is considered to be semi classical.

== Traditional music ==
The traditional music of Bhojpuri is either sung is special occasions like weddings, child birth, festivals or in every month of Vikram Samvat.

- Barahmasa : Barahmasa refers to songs describing a widow's pain of separation each month of the year.
- Biraha : The word Biraha is derived from the Sanskrit word virah which means separation. Birha is a lengthy narrative tale which is sung to a series of melodic fragments.
- Chaiti : Chaiti or Chaita is sung during the Chait month (March-April), celebrating the arrival of spring. These songs are filled with the joys of nature’s rebirth, making them a symbol of hope and renewal.
- Chhath Geet : It is sung during Chhath Puja. These songs praise the Sun God and Chhathi Maiya and express the fasting people’s enthusiasm and faith. The songs also tell about the importance of natural resources, and the conservation and use of diversity for the benefit of human welfare.
- Godhan Geet : These songs are sung on the occasion of Godhan festival.
- Godna Geet : Traditional songs for tattooing rituals.
- Janeo Geet : These songs are sung during Upnayan Sanskar (sacred thread ceremony).
- Jantsar : These songs are sung by women while grinding something in a hand-mill made of stone (jāṃtā). These songs describe the hard and painful labour undergone by women who grind wheat in heavy Grinding wheel.
- Jhijhiya : Jhijhiya songs are sung during Durga Puja.
- Jhumar : The Jhumar is a song of gaiety sung on festive occasions, especially weddings.
- Kajari : Kajari is sung during the season of Monsoon or in the month of Sawan.
- Lachari : These are amusing, gently teasing songs sung by women during wedding ceremonies.
- Nirbani : These songs are sung on the occasion of Marriage by Chamar women.
- Nirgun : Nirgun songs are spiritual in nature and focus on the formless and attribute-less divine, often praising Lord Rama, Lord Krishna, or other deities. These songs carry profound philosophical messages and delve into the deeper meaning of life and existence.
- Pachra : It is a song genre sung in the praise of Goddess Durga. It is sung on various auspicious occasions including Durga Puja.
- Pidiya Geet : These songs are sung on the occasion of Pidiya festival. Pidiya songs describe the love between brothers and sisters.
- Ropani : Ropani songs are sung while transplanting paddy.
- Sama Chakeva Geet : These songs are sung in the Shukla Paksha of Kartik month (October-November) during the Sama Chakeva festival.
- Sohani : Sohani songs are sung while weeding the fields
- Sohar : Sohar is sung on the occasion of child birth.
- Thumri : Thumri is a light classical Bhojpuri music genre focusing on romantic and devotional themes.

A Bhojpuri Godhan Geet, sung during the Godhan festival

== Modern music ==
Modernisation of Bhojpuri Music started with Bollywood songs like Nain Lad Jaihe.

== International Music ==
Bhojpuri Music is sung internationally in different countries. Some of them are Lokgeet in Fiji, Chutney Music, Soca Music, Chutney Soca in Trinidad and Guyana, Baithak Gana in Suriname, Geet Gawai in Mauritius and Taal Talaiya.
