= Siddheshwari Devi =

Background information
- Born: 8 August 1908; Benares, British India
- Died: 18 March 1977 (aged 68) New Delhi, India
- Genres: Hindustani
- Occupation: Musician
- Awards: Padma Shri (1966); Sangeet Natak Akademi Award

Siddheswari Devi (8 August 1908 – 18 March 1977) was a legendary Hindustani singer from Varanasi, India, known as Maa (mother). Her music embodied the Banaras Gharana style, which focuses on conveying deep emotions and feelings through musical notes and voice modulations. A stalwart figure in thumri, Siddheshwari's repertoire also encompassed khayals, dhrupads, dadras, tappas, kajris, chaitis, horis, and bhajans.

She is considered one of the greatest Thumri singers of the 20th century and was called the 'Thumri Queen' by her contemporaries like Kesarbai Kerkar.

== Personal life ==
Born in 1908, she was the grand daughter of acclaimed singer Maina Devi. When she lost her parents while still an infant, she was brought up by her aunt, the noted singer Rajeshwari Devi.

She had a daughter, Savita Devi who was also an acclaimed Thumri singer. Savita Devi died in 2019.

== Initiation into music ==
She started her musical training under celebrated Sarangi player, Pandit Siyaji Maharaj. Despite living in a musical household, Siddheswari came to music by accident. Rajeshwari had arranged musical training for her own daughter, Kamleshwari, while Siddheswari would do small chores around the house. Once, while the noted sarangi player Siyaji Mishra was teaching Kamleshwari, she was unable to repeat the tappa that she was being taught. Rajeshwari ran out of patience, and started to cane Kamleshwari, who cried out for help.

The only person to help her was her close friend Siddheswari, who ran from the kitchen to hug her cousin, and took the thrashing on her own body. At this point, Siddheswari told her weeping cousin, "It's not so difficult to sing what Siyaji Maharaj was telling you." Siddheswari then showed her how to sing it, performing the whole tune perfectly, much to the amazement of everyone.

The next day, Siyaji Maharaj came to Rajeshwari, and asked to adopt Siddheswari into his own family (they were childless). So Siddheswari moved in with the couple, eventually becoming a great friend and support for them.

This moving incident was very vivid in Siddheswari's mind, and is detailed in the biography Maa co-authored by her daughter Savita Devi.

== Musical career ==
Subsequently, she also trained under Rajab Ali Khan of Dewas and Inayat Khan of Lahore, but considered Bade Ramdas as her main guru.

She sang khyal, thumri (her forte) and short classical forms as dadra, chaiti, kajri etc. On several occasions she would perform through the night, for example on the overnight boating expeditions of Maharaja of Darbhanga.

The Carnatic singer M. S. Subbulakshmi learned bhajan singing from Siddheshwari Devi to widen her repertoire to include an occasional Hindi bhajan, in particular for her concerts to larger audiences across India. In 1989, noted director Mani Kaul made an award-winning documentary, Siddheshwari, on her life

Devi's popular "Dadra Tarpe Bin Balam Mora Jiya" is considered her most evocative song, which continues to haunt music lovers many years after her death.

== Awards and honours ==
- Padma Shri by the Government of India (1966)
- Sangeet Natak Akademi Award
- Honorary D.Lit. degree by the Ravindra Bharati Vishwavidyalaya in Kolkata (1973)
- Deshikottam degree by the Vishwa Bharati Vishwavidyalaya.

== Death ==
She died on 18 March 1977 in New Delhi.
