= Phaguwa =

Folk song genre of Bhojpuri

Phaguwa or Fagua (Bhojpuri: 𑂤𑂏𑂳𑂥𑂰) is a folk song genre, focusing on Bhojpuri music sung in the month of Phagun. It is sung in a group with traditional instruments such as kartal, dholak, and manjira. Phaguwa songs are based on devotion and celebrate duos of Shiva-Gauri, Radha-Krishna and Rama-Seeta playing Holi. Phaguwa songs are specially sung on the eve of Holi festival.

Apart from Bhojpuri region, it is sung in parts of the West Indies and more specifically in Trinidad and Tobago, Guyana and Suriname and Mauritius and Fiji.
