= Rekha Surya =

Indian singer

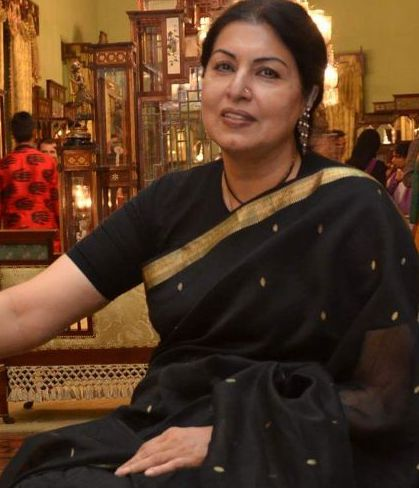

Rekha Surya (born 17 November 1959) is a Hindustani light classical singer.

== Early life ==
Rekha Surya was born in Lucknow to Inder Prakash Sur and Chand Sur. The couple migrated from Lahore to Lucknow during partition.

== Education ==
Surya did her initial schooling at Lucknow and later graduated from the Delhi University.

== Career ==
Surya got her training from Begum Akhtar and Girija Devi. She also turned out to be Begum Akhtar's last student. After Akhtar's death, Surya went to Varanasi intermittently to learn from Girija Devi. She got a scholarship at the Sangeet Natak Academy in the 1980s where Devi, employed as a Guru, trained her. Veteran Sarangi player Bashir Khan was her other Guru.

Surya recorded for the archives of Sangeet Natak Academy (SNA) in 1994. She has written a booklet "Sung In A Certain Style" which was published by SNA.

She represented India at the Asian Music Festival, Sri Lanka (1999) and at the International Falak Festival, Tajikistan (2006). Surya has performed both in India and abroad.

== The classical side ==
Surya's style of singing revolves around Sringara Rasa, which connects her with mystical poetry. She sings Dadra, Kajri, Jhoola, Hori, Chaiti and Sufiana kalaam in Dadra and Ghazal style.

== Awards ==
Surya is a Karamveer Chakra Awardee for 2012-13 under the category "Artistes 4 Change."
