= Awanish Kumar Awasthi =

Additional Chief Secretary of Uttar Pradesh

- Born: 19 August 1962 (age 64); Kanpur, Uttar Pradesh, India
- Education: IIT Kanpur
- Occupation: IAS officer
- Years active: 1987–2022
- Employer: Government of India
- Organization: Indian Administrative Service
- Spouse: Malini Awasthi
- Children: 1 daughter & 1 son

Awanish Kumar Awasthi (born 19 August 1962) is a retired Indian Administrative Service officer of Uttar Pradesh cadre, from the 1987 batch.

Awanish Kumar Awasthi was appointed as chief advisor of Chief Minister Yogi Adityanath in 2022. Awasthi is very close to CM Yogi Adityanath according to report.

The Yogi government of Uttar Pradesh has also given additional charge of energy to Additional Chief Secretary Avnish Awasthi. A. K. Sharma is the Energy Minister in the state.

== Early life and education ==
Awanish Kumar Awasthi was born on 19 August 1962. He received his B.Tech. degree in electrical engineering in 1985 from IIT Kanpur. After his graduation he passed the Civil Services Examination in 1987 and became an IAS officer.

== Career ==
Awasthi has worked at the Uttar Pradesh government in multiple roles including being the District Magistrate of Lalitpur, Badaun, Azamgarh, Varanasi, Faizabad, Meerut and Gorakhpur. He held the position of Chairman and Managing Director of Uttar Pradesh Power Corporation Limited (UPPCL) from September 2005 to January 2009. He retired as Additional Chief Secretary in the Government of Uttar Pradesh, in charge of several portfolios, such as Home and Confidential, Religious Affairs and Information. He was seen as CM Yogi Adityanath's "right-hand man".

== Personal life ==
Awanish Kumar Awasthi is married to Indian folk singer and Padma Shri (2016) awardee Malini Awasthi. They have a son Adwitiya and a daughter Ananya.
