= Jantsar =

Bhojpuri folk song

Jantsar (Kaithi: 𑂔𑂢𑂹𑂞𑂮𑂰𑂩; Devanagari: जंतसार; IAST: jāṃtasār) are a type of Bhojpuri folk songs sung by women while by grinding something in a hand-mill made of stone (jāṃtā). These songs describe the hard and painful labour undergone by women who grind Wheat in heavy Grinding wheel. These songs are considered as the labour songs in Bhojpuri folk culture as they are sung while doing labour. The labour songs sung by women (i.e. Jatsaar) are different from that of men. These songs are sweet and full of pathos. They are sung to a characteristic melody which fits well with the movement of the mill.

== Name ==
Jantsar (jāṃtasāra) is composed of two words: jāṃt and sār. Jant is the name of the grinding wheel on which wheat is ground and sar means house or place. Thus, it refers to the songs that are sung in the room in which wheat is ground.

== Types ==
akhara gaṃhuā ke choṭī-choṭī jhikiyā
sīdhavā girelā jhajhakari nu re rāmā
hathavā pirāi jaba jaṅghiyā pirāle
muhavā se chuṭe jantasāra nu re rāma
sāsu gāve "serahī", nanada mora "paserahī"
ta gotinī "duserahī" ke rāga nu re rāma

𑂃𑂎𑂩 𑂏𑂧𑂹𑂯𑂳𑂄 𑂍𑂵 𑂓𑂷𑂗𑂲-𑂓𑂷𑂗𑂲 𑂕𑂱𑂍𑂱𑂨𑂰
𑂮𑂲𑂡𑂫𑂰 𑂏𑂱𑂩𑂵𑂪𑂰 𑂕𑂕𑂍𑂩𑂱 𑂢𑂳 𑂩𑂵 𑂩𑂰𑂧𑂰
𑂯𑂟𑂫𑂰 𑂣𑂱𑂩𑂰𑂅 𑂔𑂥 𑂔𑂑𑂹𑂐𑂱𑂨𑂰 𑂣𑂱𑂩𑂰𑂪𑂵
𑂧𑂳𑂯𑂫𑂰 𑂮𑂵 𑂓𑂳𑂗𑂵 𑂔𑂢𑂹𑂞𑂮𑂰𑂩 𑂢𑂳 𑂩𑂵 𑂩𑂰𑂧
𑂮𑂰𑂮𑂳 𑂏𑂰𑂫𑂵 "𑂮𑂵𑂩𑂯𑂲", 𑂢𑂢𑂠 𑂧𑂷𑂩 "𑂣𑂮𑂵𑂩𑂯𑂲"
𑂞 𑂏𑂷𑂞𑂱𑂢𑂲 "𑂠𑂳𑂮𑂵𑂩𑂯𑂲" 𑂍𑂵 𑂩𑂰𑂏 𑂢𑂳 𑂩𑂵 𑂩𑂰𑂧

Translation:

I am grinding wheat in the grinding wheel
The flour is falling below gradually
My hands and thighs are paining
And in this situation I am expressing my pain by singing Jantsar
My mother in laws sings "Serahi" while my sister in laws sings "Paserahi"
and my Husband's Brother's wife sings "Duserahi"

Jantsar songs can be categorized on the basis of quality and quantity of the wheat viz. Chhatkahi, Pavahi, Serahi, Duserahi, Teen-Serahi, Paserahi.
