= Samuel Singh =

Nigerian singer and YouTube personality (born 1991)

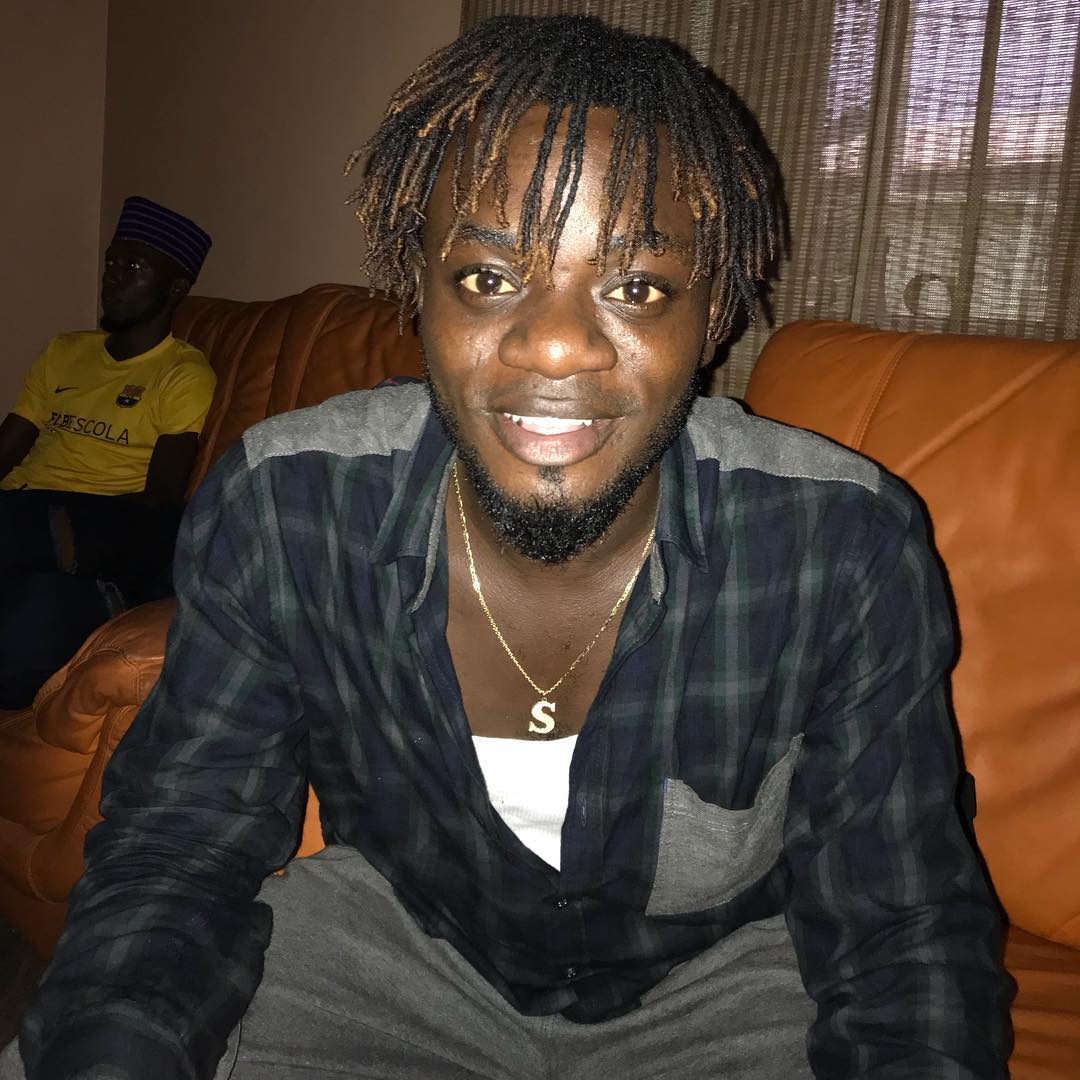
- Samuel in 2020

Background information
- Born: Samuel Adepoju; 20 March 1991 (age 35); Ota, Ogun, Nigeria
- Genres: Bollywood, Reggae, Pop
- Occupations: Singer; songwriter; record producer
- Years active: 2017–present

Samuel Singh (born 20 March 1991) is a Nigerian singer and YouTube personality. He is famous for his Bhojpuri cover songs. He got recognition when he uploaded "Lollipop Lagelu" (Bhojpuri Song) cover on his YouTube channel. He graduated from Suresh Gyan Vihar University in Jaipur.

== Early life ==
Samuel was born as Samuel Adepoju in Ogun state in Nigeria. In June 2017, he started uploading videos on his YouTube channel.
