= Durgamati =

2020 Indian film by G. Ashok

- Official release poster
- Directed by: G. Ashok
- Written by: G. Ashok
- Based on: Bhaagamathie (2018)
- Produced by: Bhushan Kumar; Krishan Kumar; Vikram Malhotra
- Starring: Bhumi Pednekar; Arshad Warsi; Jisshu Sengupta; Mahie Gill
- Cinematography: Kuldeep Mamania
- Edited by: Sanjeev Kumar
- Music by: Songs: Tanishk Bagchi; Naman Adhikari; Abhinav Sharma; Malini Awasthi; Background Score: Jakes Bejoy
- Production companies: T-Series Films; Abundantia Entertainment; Cape Of Good Films
- Distributed by: Amazon Prime Video
- Release date: 11 December 2020
- Running time: 156 minutes
- Country: India
- Language: Hindi

Durgamati (transl. The Wisdom of Durga) is a 2020 Indian Hindi-language horror thriller film written and directed by G. Ashok which is a remake of his own Telugu–Tamil bilingual film Bhaagamathie (2018). It stars Bhumi Pednekar as an IAS officer, with Arshad Warsi, Jisshu Sengupta and Mahie Gill playing supporting roles. The film is produced by Bhushan Kumar, Krishan Kumar and Vikram Malhotra under T-Series, Cape Of Good Films and Abundantia Entertainment.

The official announcement for the film was made on 30 November 2019. First shot was taken on 23 January 2020 in Madhya Pradesh and filming begun there on 30 January. Due to the COVID-19 pandemic, the film has been available to stream worldwide from 11 December 2020 on Amazon Prime Video.

== Plot ==
The film starts with Ishwar Prasad, a politician who vows to resign from his post if the government fails to recover idols stolen over six months ago. This troubles his political rivals, who forge a plan to destroy his credibility with CBI Joint Director Satakshi Ganguly and Assistant Commissioner of Police Abhay Singh. The two plan to interrogate IAS Chanchal Chauhan, a close confidante of Ishwar, who is in jail for murdering her fiancé Shakti, Abhay's brother. To avoid attention, they shift her to Durgamati Bungalow, a dilapidated, supposedly haunted house in the outskirts of a city, for the interrogation. The CBI question Chanchal to get some clues against Ishwar, but she repeats that he is a good man and doubts his integrity without proof in a cryptic but leading manner.

Later that night, the spirit of Durgamati, the Queen of the house before independence, takes control of Chanchal. The CBI team calls upon a psychiatrist to investigate the matter, who concludes that Chanchal must be schizophrenic as she seems to take on a different persona and narrate some story from a book as if it were her own. He suggests that the CBI commit her to an asylum. However, Abhay suspects that this might be a ploy by her to escape and arranges for a spiritual guru to find out if there is paranormal activity. The guru suggests a few indicators. Later, Abhay discovers that those indicators indicate the presence of ghosts in the bungalow. He also finds Chanchal hurting herself under the influence of the spirit. This leads to Abhay taking Chanchal to a mental hospital.

Ishwar visits her at the mental asylum, and it is revealed that Chanchal had planned the entire thing to escape the CBI in return for a 300 Crore kickback from Ishwar. It is also shown that Ishwar had forced Chanchal to kill Shakti (her fiancé) to hide his scam regarding a welfare project.

Meanwhile, Satakshi realizes that Chanchal was trying to convey the truth of Ishwar's crimes using the story of Queen Durgamati, which she came across from the various writings and artifacts she had discovered in the bungalow. She also finds evidence of Ishwar's misdeeds and the site where he hid the villagers after killing Shakti with a gun.

Thus vindicated, Chanchal is seen running a charity organization in memory of Shakti. Satakshi then tells her that they thought they knew everything about her but never knew that she was a great magician in her childhood and learned Arabic. Chanchal replies by saying that she does not know Arabic, which shocks them, hinting that there was actual paranormal activity in the house.

== Cast ==
- Bhumi Pednekar as Chanchal Chauhan IAS / Durgamati
- Arshad Warsi as Central Minister Ishwar Prasad
- Jisshu Sengupta as ACP Abhay Singh (Shakti's Elder Brother)
- Mahie Gill as CBI Chief Satakshi Ganguly
- Karan Kapadia as Shakti Singh
- Prabhat Raghunandan as Ajay Yadav
- Ashok Sharma as Ajay's father
- Dhanraj as Nand Singh
- Brij Bhushan Shukla as Gopi
- Ada Singh as Satakshi's daughter
- Shoeb Ali as Sodhi
- Shubhendra Gupta as Analyser
- Chandan Vicky Roy as Darruk
- Amit Behl as Jose
- K. Durga Prasad as Selvam
- Muskan Lalwani as Malti Sharma
- Anant Mahadevan as Psychiatrist
- Tanya Abrol as PSI Peetal Devi (Constable)

== Release ==
On 23 November 2020, the title of the film was changed to Durgavati from Durgamati.

Due to the COVID-19 pandemic, the film was available to stream worldwide from 11 December 2020 on Amazon Prime Video. The film's satellite rights were sold to Sony Max.

== Reception ==
On the review aggregator website Rotten Tomatoes, 0% of 9 critics' reviews are positive, with an average rating of 3.7/10.

Joginder Tuteja of Planet Bollywood gave the film 2.5/5 stars writing 'Durgamati-An Entertaining Horror Drama with Abbas Mustan Style twist pe twist'. He Concluded that 'All in all~~,~~ Durgamati turns out to be one of those rare films (especially in the current times) that you can watch comfortably with your family. Play it on and you won't be disappointed. Pallabi Dey Purkayastha of Times of India gave the film 2.5/5 stars by saying that 'Durgamati is relevant but the storytelling lacks the spirit it needed'. She praised Sengupta's performance by saying that he charms us the way he always does, effortlessly. She concluded that Durgamati could be delivered better.

== Soundtrack ==
Durgamati

Soundtrack album by Tanishk Bagchi, Naman Adhikari, Abhinav Sharma and Malini Awasthi
- Released: 11 December 2020
- Genre: Feature film soundtrack
- Length: 8:09
- Language: Hindi
- Label: T-Series

Official audio
- Durgamati - Full Album on YouTube

The film score was composed by Jakes Bejoy and the songs were composed by Tanishk Bagchi, Naman Adhikari, Abhinav Sharma and Malini Awasthi while lyrics written by Tanishk Bagchi and Dipti Misra.

Track listing
No.	Title	Lyrics	Music	Singer(s)	Length
1.	"Baras Baras"	Tanishk Bagchi	Tanishk Bagchi	B Praak, Altamash Faridi	3:20
2.	"Heer"	Dipti Misra	Naman Adhikari, Abhinav Sharma, Malini Awasthi	Malini Awasthi	4:49
Total length:					8:09
