= Geet-Gawai =

Geet-Gawai (Bhojpuri language: 𑂏𑂲𑂞 𑂏𑂫𑂰𑂆) also called Geet Gawai is a pre-wedding ceremony of Bhojpuri speaking people of Indian descent in Mauritius. In 2016, this ritual was added to the UNESCO's Intangible Cultural Heritage List. This pre-wedding ceremony is a combination of certain traditional rituals, prayers to the gods and the goddesses, songs, music and dance. The ceremony may be done at the residence of the bride or the groom, and is carried out by female family members and neighbours. This ceremony represents collective cultural memory. By breaking barriers of caste and class, it contributes to the building of smooth and cohesive community identity. Presently, Geet-Gawai has come out of the confines of being a family function, and public performances also take place. Now-a-days, apart from women, men are also participating in these events.
