= Music Ensemble of Benares =

Indian music ensemble

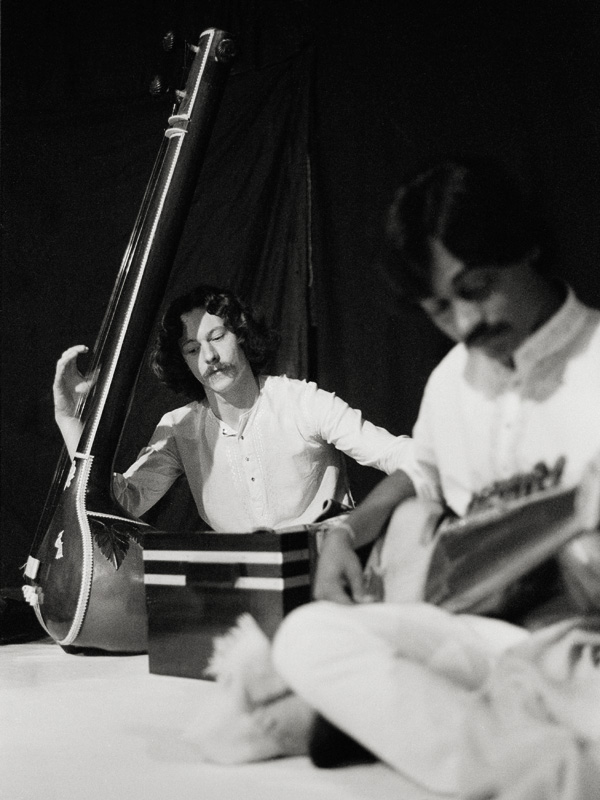
Music Ensemble of Benares, Moers/Germany 1983

The Music Ensemble of Benares is a musical ensemble from the north Indian city of Benares (Varanasi) that primarily plays Indian classical music. The ensemble was conceived in 1975 and founded in 1982 by the German musician Gunther Paust (born 1954).

== The origins ==
Through Ravi Shankar's appearance at the 1969 Woodstock Festival the Paust first came in touch with Indian classical music. In 1975 Paust left Germany and travelled overland to India by car. His purpose was initially to take sitar lessons, however he soon realised that the sitar was an immensely complex instrument. Nevertheless, inspired and enchanted by the music he had encountered, Paust decided to pursue a different avenue and upon his return to Europe he immediately began organising concerts and producing records to further popularise, and introduce others to the sounds of Indian music. In 1982, Paust founded the collective Music Ensemble of Benares with which he started his first European tour. From that point forth, this ensemble has performed regularly in Europe as a more or less open unit encompassing many different musicians and various instruments.

Since that time Paust has striven to bring new ideas and explore new facets of musical development. Besides presenting traditional raga and Kathak dance he has organised more experimental musical projects, most notably, between 1989 and 1994, the "Jazz meets India" sessions with jazz musicians from the USA: Paul Horn, John Handy, David Friensen et al.

His latest project, since 1994, fuses Northern Indian 'Kathak Dance' and Flamenco. These unique forms possess similar elements and it is the aim of this project to further extend and explore the common roots of the two cultures.

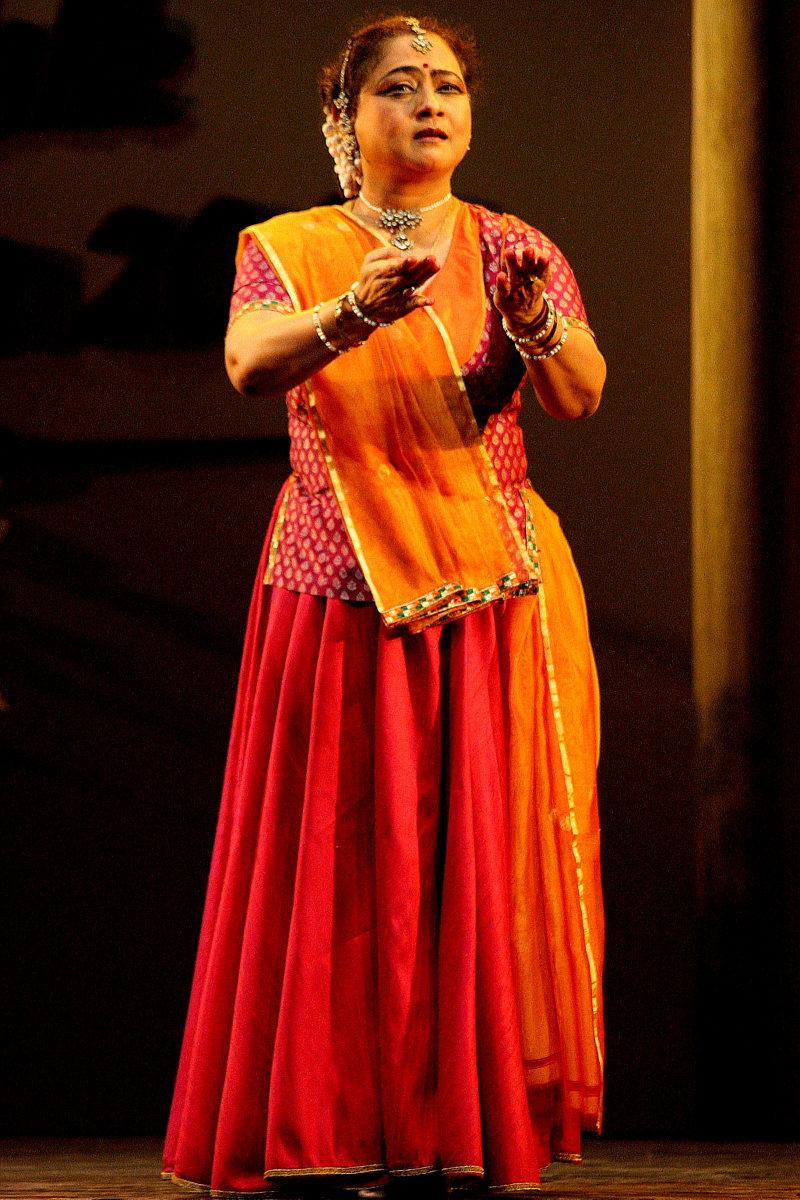
Vaswati Mishra performing in2011

== List of current members ==
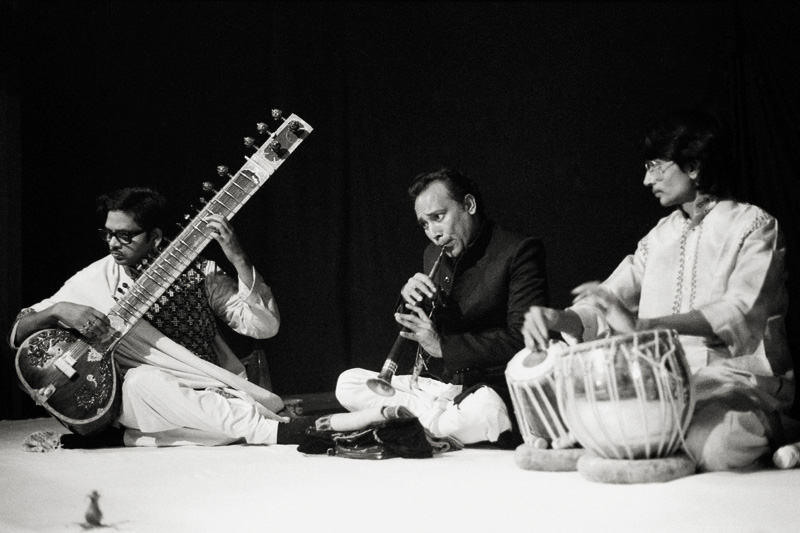
Music Ensemble of Benares, Moers/Germany 1983

- Dayal, Jyotika (born 1967, Benares, India) An upcoming artist who has completed her Post Diploma in the field of Hindustani classical vocal music under the guidance of Pandit Amarnath and Smt. Shanti Sharma at the "Shri Ram Bharatiya Kala Kendra" in New Delhi. She was a recipient of a senior scholarship from the government of India from 1995 to 1998. Dayal has performed at the Yuva Mahotsav festival, organised by Sahitya Kala Parishad, New Delhi and given several performances at Shri Ram Bharatiya Kala Kendra, also for "All India Radio". At the age of eighteen, she began her training in Kathak dance under Smt. Reba Vidyarthi of the Lucknow Gharana. Under the guidance of Smt. Vaswati Mishra, Dayal has since been awarded her second Post Diploma at the Kathak Kendra in New Delhi. Her first experiences abroad were in Europe and Mauritius in the years 1995/1996 as a member of a company of twelve artists. Since 1998 she has been a member of the Music Ensemble of Benares, where she has played an important part not only as a singer and kathak dancer but also as a composer and choreographer.
- Moreno, Ursula, Rosalia (born 1973, Malaga, Spain). Originating from a family of Spanish artists, her uncle, Antonio Molina, was one of the best Flamenco singers in Andalucia. Moreno studied performing arts at the "Real Conservatorio de Musica y Danza de Malaga" after which she learned from Flamenco masters Tona Radely (Malaga), Loli Flores & Matilde Coral (Sevilla), Maria Magdalena, Antonio Canales, Carmen Cortes "La China" and Adrian Galia (Madrid). Morena toured with the company of Conchita del Mar and Luis Ponce for many years until she founded her own dance studio in Switzerland. She was leading this studio for five years successfully. Since 2001 she has returned to her home-town Malaga and is the solo-dancer of the Compania Flamenca Alhama and the project Antonio Andrade & Fiesta Flamancea. She also teaches Flamenco dance in Europe, USA and Japan.
- Khan, Allarakha (born 1980, Jaipur, India). Khan belongs to a family of illustrious Sarangi players; Ustad Noorkhan and Ustad Madari Khan of Sikar in Rajasthan. As a child he began taking Sarangi lessons, first from his father Ustad Yamin Khan and later from his grandfather Ustad Imamuddin Khan. At sixteen he gave public concerts and has accompanied masters such as: Shuba Mudhgal, Atul Desai, et al. Khan is also a studio musician at All India Radio. Though his main subject is classical Indian music he is also interested in fusion projects. He has composed music for theatre and worked together with a DJ. As he says: "I would like to experience all that is possible to play on the Sarangi".
- Andrade, Antonio (born 1963, Puebla de Cazalla, Seville, Spain). He comes from a family that has a close connection to Flamenco. He was particularly influenced by his relative Jose Menez, one of the greatest living Flamenco singers. Andrade started playing the guitar at a young age under the tutelage of Romero de Badajoz, Miquel Perez Sr., Miquel Perez Jr. and Antonio Amador. During his long career Andrade has worked with numerous artists such as Javir Baron, Israel Galvon, Antonio "El Pipa", Javier Cruz, Pilar Astola, Sara Baras, Carmen Ledesma, Meme Mengibar, Concha Vargas, Manolo Marin, Andr� Heller, et al. He has demonstrated his artistic talents in numerous concerts and tours at home and abroad. He is the founder and art director of the Compania Flamenca Alhama & Maria Serrano and has started a second project called "Fiesta Flamenca". Since 1995 Andrade has been working with the Music Ensemble of Benares and their Kathak Flamenco project, in which he has an important part as guitar player and composer.
- Joy, Joby (born 1978, Wayanad, India). It is rare for someone born in Southern India to play the north Indian tabla. These days Joy is teaching at the Kadamb University in Ahmedabad and accompanying the Kathak dance. He first came to Europe in 2005. He does not only play for Kathak dance but also has a good understanding of Flamenco.
- Parrondo, Jose (born 1959, Carmona, Sevilla, Spain). Flamenco singer. During his international career Parrondo has won many awards. He is the only one to gain three first prizes in the Concurso de Cante de Antonio Mairena and also the Antorcha del Cante. He is also the winner of the Concurso Memorial Camaron de la Isla in Cadiz and he has got five first awards of the International Festival de la Union (Murcia). Among his numerous TV and CD productions the album "Agua Limpia" with Pedro Bacan and "Locuras del Carazon" with Manuel Herrera are noteworthy.
- Paust, Gunther (born 1954, Mannheim, Germany). In 1978/79 he took sitar lessons at the Sanskrit University in Benares. In 1981 he organised concerts in Europe and founded the Music Ensemble of Benarees in 1982. Paust has introduced more than eighty artists to the European audience, mostly from Benares. He produced quite a few LPs in the 1980s and has also added five CDs. In 1997 he completed a diploma course in 'Nada Brahma' music therapy with Vemu Mukunda of Bangalore. Paust is also co-author of the 1997 book "Indische Musik in Deutschland" (Indian music in Germany). More recently Paust has been working as a moderator for the South West Radio Station in Baden-Baden Germany. Paust spends several weeks a year in India to contact new talents and artists. He has organised 44 concert tours with about 1500 concerts in Europe.

== CD discography ==
- 1983, 1986. Music Ensemble of Benares, AMF Music (AMF CDF 102)
- 1991. John Handy's Musical Dreamland, Hammer Musik (BLD 515)
- 1992. 10 Years Music Ensemble of Benares, Hammer Musik (BLD 518)
- 1997. Music Ensemble of Benares presents Kathak Dance, Hammer Musik (BLD 537)
- 2000. Music Ensemble of Benares presents Circle of the Day, Hammer Musik (BLD 550)
