= Neha Singh Rathore =

Indian folk singer (born 1997)

- Born: 1997 (age 28–29); Jandaha, Bihar, India
- Education: Kanpur University (B.Sc.)

Neha Singh Rathore (born 1997) is a political satirist. She is known for songs with a focus on political and social issues.

== Early life and education ==
Neha Singh Rathore was born in 1997 and raised in Jandaha. Her father is an architect and her mother is a singer and a homemaker, and Rathore is the youngest of three siblings. Rathore completed a B.Sc. at Kanpur University in 2018.

== Career ==
In 2019, Rathore began her career as a composer and singer of Bhojpuri folk songs, started recording song videos on a phone, and uploaded video to Facebook. Rathore has said she considers the work of Bhojpuri poets Bhikhari Thakur and Mahendar Misir to be inspirations for her songs. During the COVID-19 pandemic in India, after learning about the impact of the March 2020 lockdown on migrant workers, she began her YouTube channel in May 2020 so she could use social media and music to raise awareness.

She has posted her work on YouTube, Facebook, Instagram, and Twitter, and by October 2020, had about fifty popular videos, with recognition for satire about politics and political figures. In her music videos, she wears a bindi and sari in the pallu style - according to Jyoti Yadav, writing for ThePrint, "The combination of this unthreatening visage and excoriating lyrics challenging the highest echelons of power soon had people paying attention."

In 2021, Rathore received the YouTube Silver Creator Award after her channel reached 100,000 subscribers. By November 2023, her YouTube channel had 1.2 million subscribers, and she was producing between two and four song videos per month.

Rathore’s 2020 rap “Bihar Mein Ka Ba” adapted a Manoj Bajpayee song “Bambai Mein Ka Ba” to highlight issues of Bihar workers during elections. In 2022, her “UP Mein Ka Ba?” criticized governance over COVID-19 deaths, Lakhimpur violence, and the Hathras case. She continued with “UP Mein Ka Ba? Session-2” in 2023 after deaths during an eviction in Kanpur Dehat, drawing a police notice and public criticism of the action. Later that year, a BJP worker filed a case against a post captioned “MP Mein Ka Ba?” referencing a urination incident in Madhya Pradesh. She then released a matching song that circulated widely during the state elections.

Rathore received a notice by Varansi police in connection with a case registered in 2025 alleged objectionable remarks against Prime Minister Narendra Modi.

== Personal life ==
In 2022, Rathore married Himanshu Singh.
