= Chaiti =

Semi-Classical music genre

Chaiti or Chaita (Bhojpuri: 𑂡𑂆𑂞𑂲) are semi-classical songs, originating from Bhojpuri region corresponding to the calendar month of Chait. These songs are rendered during the holy month of Sri Rama Navami in March/April. It falls under the light classical form of Hindustani classical music. It is a part of the rich Bhojpuri music tradition. The songs typically invoke the name of Lord Rama and celebrate the spring season.

It comes in the series of season songs, like Kajari, Hori, and Sawani, and is traditionally sung in the states of Jharkhand and Bihar. Girija Devi is among the most popular and renowned singers of Chaiti.

== Origin and cultural context ==
Chaiti songs emerged from the folk traditions of the Bhojpur region encompassing Northern Jharkhand and Southern – western Bihar. The genre derives its name from the Hindu month of Chaitra (March-April), which marks the arrival of spring and is considered auspicious in Hindu tradition. This period coincides with several important festivals, particularly Ram Navami, celebrating the birth of Lord Rama, which explains the predominance of devotional themes in Chaiti compositions.

The songs reflect the agricultural calendar and the joy associated with spring harvest. In rural areas, Chaiti was traditionally performed by folk singers during community gatherings, weddings, and religious festivals. Over time, the genre was adopted and refined by classical musicians, transforming it into a semi-classical form while retaining its folk essence.

== Musical characteristics ==
=== Structure and composition ===
Chaiti compositions typically follow a simple melodic structure that bridges folk and classical traditions. The songs are usually set in ragas appropriate for spring, such as Khamaj, Bhairavi, Kafi, and Pilu. These ragas lend themselves to the emotional expression of devotion and the celebration of nature's renewal.

The rhythmic patterns (tala) used in Chaiti are generally moderate to fast-paced, commonly employing Tintal (16 beats), Keherwa (8 beats), or Dadra (6 beats). The tempo allows for expressive melodic elaboration while maintaining rhythmic vitality that engages listeners.

=== Lyrical content ===
The lyrics of Chaiti songs are predominantly in Bhojpuri, Awadhi, or a mixture of Eastern Hindi dialects. The poetic content typically includes:

- Devotional themes: Invocations to Lord Rama and Sita, narrations from the Ramayana, and descriptions of Rama's virtues
- Seasonal descriptions: Celebrations of spring (Vasant), blooming flowers, mango blossoms, and the kokil (cuckoo) bird
- Romantic imagery: Expressions of viraha (separation), longing, and the joy of union, often using Krishna and Radha as metaphors
- Social commentary: Occasional references to daily life, agricultural activities, and social customs of the region

== Performance practice ==
=== Traditional context ===
In its folk avatar, Chaiti was performed during community celebrations called Chaiti mela or gatherings during the Chaitra month. Women would sing Chaiti songs while performing household tasks or during collective activities like fetching water or grinding grain. Male folk singers, often accompanied by simple percussion instruments like the dholak and manjira (cymbals), would perform at temples and public spaces.

=== Classical adaptation ===
When adapted into the semi-classical repertoire, Chaiti performances acquired more sophisticated characteristics:

- Use of classical instruments: tabla, harmonium, sarangi, or violin for accompaniment
- Incorporation of classical techniques: meend (glides), murki (fast ornamental passages), and gamak (oscillations)
- Extended improvisations within the raga framework
- Formal concert settings rather than informal gatherings

Despite these refinements, classical renditions of Chaiti maintain the genre's folk flavor and emotional directness, distinguishing it from more elaborate forms like khyal or thumri.

== Regional variations ==
While Chaiti is most strongly associated with the Bhojpuri-speaking regions, variations exist across North India:

- Eastern Uttar Pradesh: Emphasizes devotional content with elaborate descriptions of Rama's virtues, often performed during Ramcharitmanas recitations
- Bihar: Features more folk-oriented style with simpler melodic patterns and stronger rhythmic elements
- Banaras (Varanasi): The classical tradition of Banaras gharana has produced highly refined Chaiti compositions that balance classical sophistication with folk authenticity

== Notable exponents ==
=== Girija Devi ===
Vidushi Girija Devi (1929-2017), the legendary vocalist from Varanasi, is considered the foremost exponent of Chaiti in the classical tradition. Her renditions brought Chaiti to national and international audiences, establishing it as a sophisticated semi-classical form. She masterfully combined the folk earthiness of Chaiti with classical refinement, creating performances that were both accessible and artistically profound.

=== Shobha Gurtu ===
Shobha Gurtu (1925-2004), another stalwart of semi-classical music, included Chaiti in her extensive repertoire of light classical forms. Her interpretations emphasized the emotional and devotional aspects of the genre.

=== Chhannulal Mishra ===
Pandit Chhannulal Mishra (born 1936), a vocalist from Varanasi specializing in semi-classical music, is renowned for his authentic renditions of Chaiti that preserve the folk character while demonstrating classical virtuosity.

=== Contemporary artists ===
Several contemporary artists continue the Chaiti tradition:

- Malini Awasthi - Known for reviving folk traditions including Chaiti
- Shubha Mudgal - Performs Chaiti as part of her semi-classical repertoire
- Rashid Khan - Occasionally includes Chaiti in his concerts
- Various folk artists from Bihar and Uttar Pradesh who maintain the traditional style

== Relationship to other seasonal genres ==
Chaiti belongs to a family of seasonal songs (Ritu geet) in North Indian music, each associated with specific times of the year:

- Hori: Sung during Holi festival (February-March), celebrating spring and Krishna's playfulness
- Chaiti: Performed during Chaitra month (March-April), marking Ram Navami and spring harvest
- Kajari: Associated with the monsoon season (July-August), expressing the joy and longing of the rainy season
- Sawani: Sung during Sawan month (July-August), depicting monsoon themes and feminine emotions

These genres share similar folk origins, regional languages, and the practice of combining seasonal imagery with devotional or romantic themes. Together, they form an important part of the semi-classical tradition that connects rural folk culture with urban classical music.

== Contemporary status and preservation ==
In contemporary times, Chaiti faces challenges common to many folk-based art forms. The decline of rural community gatherings and the migration of populations to urban areas have reduced opportunities for traditional Chaiti performances. However, several initiatives are working to preserve and promote this genre:

- The Sangeet Natak Akademi and state cultural departments organize Chaiti festivals during the Chaitra month
- Music schools in Uttar Pradesh and Bihar include Chaiti in their semi-classical curriculum
- Recording projects have documented traditional and classical renditions of Chaiti for archival purposes
- Contemporary folk fusion artists are experimenting with Chaiti, introducing it to younger audiences through modern arrangements

Radio and television programs during the Chaitra month continue to feature Chaiti performances, helping maintain public awareness of this seasonal tradition. Digital platforms and social media have also provided new avenues for Chaiti artists to reach audiences beyond regional boundaries.

== See also ==
- Thumri
- Dadra (music)
- Kajari
- Hori (music)
- Bhojpuri music
- Hindustani classical music
- Folk music of Uttar Pradesh
- Ram Navami
