= Thumri =

Vocal style in Indian music

“Aan Baan Jiya Mein Lago”, sung by Gauhar Jaan in 1904, collection of William Sinkler Darby

Thumri (Bhojpuri: [ˈʈʰʊmɾiː]) is a vocal genre or style of Indian music. The term derives from the Sanskrit-rooted thumak, which describes a rhythmic, dancing walk that makes ankle-bells jingle. The form is thus connected with dance, dramatic gestures, mild eroticism, and evocative love poetry and folk songs (specially from the Bhojpuri, Awadh and Braj regions of Indian subcontinent.

The texts range from the romantic to the devotional, often layering both, with lyrics typically composed in Awadhi, Bhojpuri, or Brij Bhasha. Thumri is defined by this sensuality, and a melodic flexibility that allows the performer to venture beyond the raga’s strict structure to heighten emotional expression (rasa).

Thumri is also used as a generic name for stylized regional lyrical forms such as Dadra, Hori, Kajari, Sawani, Jhoola, and Chaiti, even though each of them has their own structure and content—either lyrical or musical or both—and so the exposition of these forms vary. Like Indian classical music itself, some of these forms have their origin in folk literature and music.

Thumri stands apart from the austere dhrupad and structured khayal styles of Hindustani music. While it flourished in the 19th-century court of Wajid Ali Shah, the genre shares a direct functional lineage with the dhruvas described in Bharata's Natyasastra. Specifically, it embodies the characteristics of the prasadiki dhruva: a medium-tempo form dedicated to shringara rasa and defined by emotional 'brightness' (prasada) and melodic delight (rangaraga).

In modern performance, thumri is characterized by:

1. Strong emphasis on poetic content
2. Lyricals themes of shringara rasa (romantic love), often with interwoven spiritual and quotidian meanings
3. Extensive melodic elaboration, but within a limited group of ragas
4. Preference for emotional impact over melodic rigidity, allowing expressive deviations from a raga’s strict structure to better serve the lyrics
5. Particularity in vocal expression and voice
6. Association with the Kathak dance style
7. Reliance on specialized talas that provide a fluid framework for emotive storytelling
8. Embellishments focus on 'word-painting', i.e., using melodic nuances to amplify the literal meaning and emotional subtext of the lyrics

== Structure ==
As in khayal, thumri has two parts, the sthayi and the antara. It favours talas such as Deepchandi, Roopak, Addha, and Punjabi. These tala-s are characterized by a special lilt, nearly absent in the tala-s used in khayal. Thumri compositions are mostly in ragas such as Kafi, Khamaj, Jogiya, Bhairavi, Pilu and Pahadi. A common feature of these and other such ragas is the free movement they allow the artist, since they do not depend for their identity on rigidly formulated tonal sequences, irrespective of the compositions involved. In fact, one may say that they have a built-in provision for mixing ragas or for moving out of the nominal raga to add color to the proceedings.

== Origins ==
The origins of Thumri can be traced back to the time of Jayadeva, Ramanuja, and Ramanand. It reached its peak popularity during the era of Shri Chaitanya (circa 16th century AD), whose Nagar Kirtan (Hare Krishna Hare Rama) stirred the masses into emotional ecstasies. The evolution of Thumri was inspired by the Vaishnavism sect, especially the devotion to Krishna, which expressed divine love. Later, the philosophies of Vaishnavism and Sufism played a key role in shaping both Thumri and Kathak. The Thumri style of singing primarily developed from festival and seasonal folk songs such as Holi, Chaiti, Sawan, Kajri, and Dadra, originating from eastern Uttar Pradesh.

A mention of Thumri is found in the 19th century, with a link to the classical dance form Kathak. This was the bandish ki thumri or bol-baant and it found great patronage and evolved mostly in Lucknow in the court of nawab Wajid Ali Shah. At that time, it was a song sung by tawaifs or courtesans. According to historical records, a new version of thumri arose in the late 19th century, which was independent of dance, and much more slow-paced. This form was called bol-banav and it evolved in Varanasi.

== Thumri and khayal ==
Unlike the khayal, which pays meticulous attention to unfolding a raga, thumri restricts itself to expressing the countless hues of shringar by combining melody and words. The contours of a khayal are most definitely broader and fluid. Thus, a khayal singer is capable of encompassing and expressing a wide range of complex emotions. A thumri singer goes straight to the emotional core of a composition and evokes each yarn of amorous feeling, each strand of sensuous sentiment, with great discretion. Khayal aims at achieving poise and splendour; thumri is quicksilver in tone and ardently romantic in spirit. It needs a delicate heart, and a supple and soulful voice capable of expressing several shadings and colours of tones to bring out its beauty.

== Noted thumri artists ==
=== Purab ang ===
Well-known artists of the 'purab ang' thumri' of the Benaras gharana or Banaras gayaki include Rasoolan Bai (1902–1974), Siddheshwari Devi (1908–1977), Girija Devi (1929–2017), Mahadev Prasad Mishra (1906–1995), Chhannulal Mishra (b. 1936) and PURNIMA CHAUDHURI (1945-2013).

Some other singers of thumri are Gauhar Jan (1873–1930), Begum Akhtar (1914–1974), Shobha Gurtu (1925–2004), Noor Jehan (1926–2000) and Nirmala Devi (1927-1996). The bol banao style has a slow tempo and is concluded by a laggi, a faster phase where the tabla player has some freedom of improvisation.

Another stalwart in the genre of thumri was Naina Devi (1917–1993), who was married to a royal family but later devoted her life to the singing of the song of Tawaifs. For a member of the royal family to take such a step in those days meant fighting countless social stigmas that had enough power to totally alienate someone from the society, but she had the support of her husband.

=== Classical thumri ===
Some khyal singers took an interest in thumrī and sang it their own way, as in the case of Abdul Karim Khan, Faiyaz Khan, Bade Ghulam Ali Khan, Bhimsen Joshi, Madhav Gudi, Rajan and Sajan Mishra, Barkat Ali Khan, Jagdish Prasad and Prabha Atre.

Today thumrī is sometimes sung at the end of khyal concerts as a concluding item. Besides the tabla and the tanpura, other typical instruments in thumri are sarangi, harmonium and swarmandal. The reason as to why thumri concludes an occasion is because it has a lasting emotional impact on the audience.

== Lyrics ==
Thumri singers pay considerable attention to the lyrics, though they may be difficult to follow in the ornamented enunciation. This is especially where the focus is on love, and many lyrics deal with separation or viraha. Krishna's ras leela or love play with Radha and other gopis of Vrindavan appear frequently. As an example, here are the lyrics of a thumrī composed by the medieval poet Lalan, celebrating Krishna's flute – how its tunes are driving Radha mad. Braj or Vrindavan is where Krishna is indulging in this love play; Radha is the "Girl of Braj".

Ab naa baajaao Shyaam
bansuriyaa naa baajaao Shyaam
(e rii) Byaakul bhaayii Brajabaalaa
bansuriyaa naa baajaao Shyaam
nit merii galiin me aayo naa
aayo to chhup ke rahiyo
bansii ki teri sunaayo naa
bansii jo sunaayo to suniye
phir Shyaam hame aapnaayo naa
aapnaayo to suniye Laalan
phir chhoDo hame kahi jaaiyo naa
bansuriyaa naa baajaao Shyaam

Enough! Now stop
playing on your flute, dark lover
this Braja girl's heart is aflutter,
I ask you, please stop playing
don't come to my lane all the time
and if you have to come,
just don't play your flute
I am warning you now:
if you have to play that flute
then you'll have to be mine
you won't be able to go elsewhere
so will you please stop playing now?
