= Girija Devi =

Indian classical singer (1929–2017)

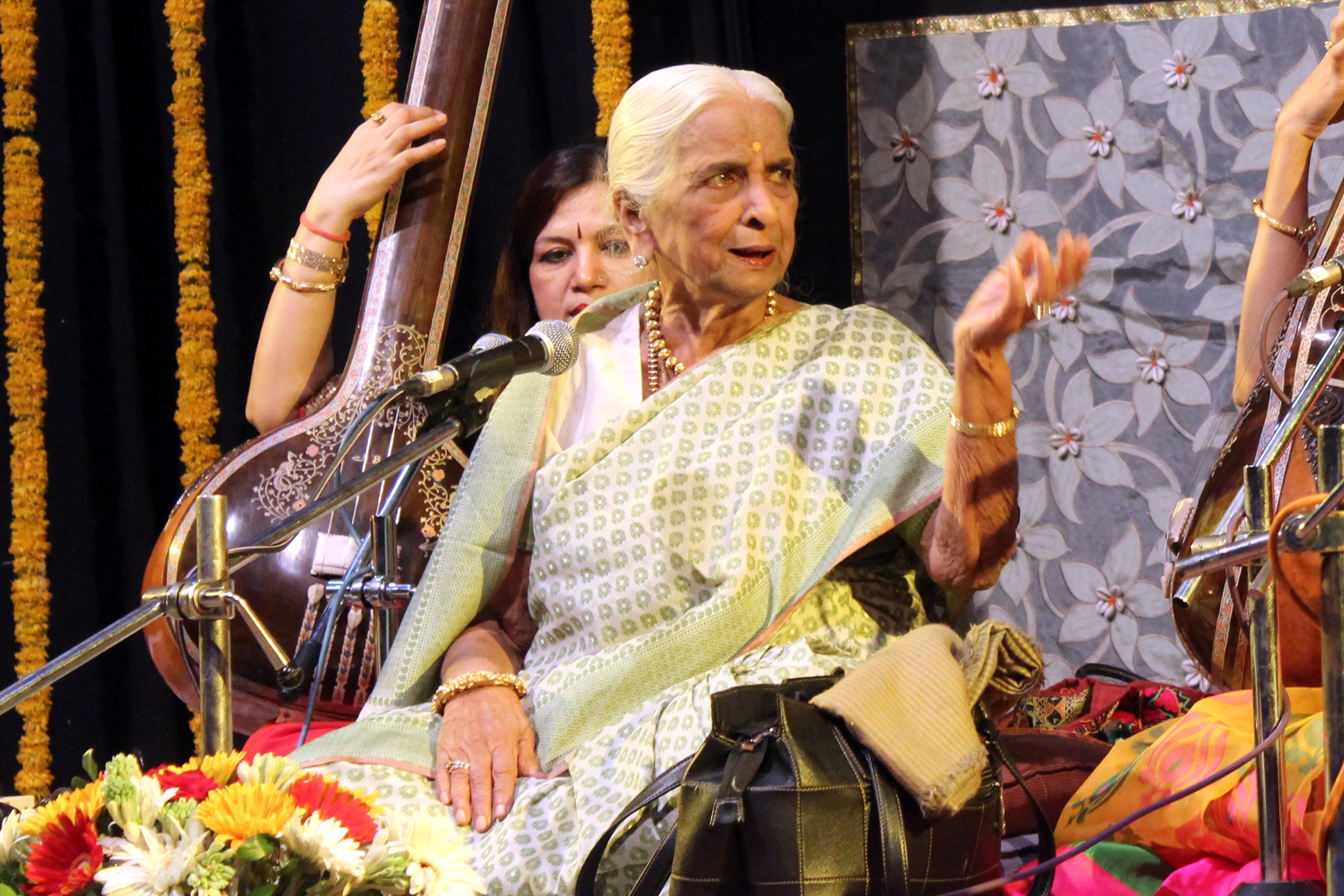
- Devi performing in Bharat Bhavan, Bhopal (July 2015)

Background information
- Born: 8 May 1929; Benares, Benares State, British India
- Died: 24 October 2017 (aged 88) Kolkata, West Bengal, India
- Genre: Hindustani classical music
- Instrument: vocal
- Years active: 1949–2017

Girija Devi (8 May 1929 – 24 October 2017) was an Indian classical singer of the Seniya and Banaras gharanas. She performed classical and light classical music and helped elevate the profile of thumri. She was dubbed as the 'Queen of Thumri' for her contribution to the genre. She died on 24 October 2017.

== Early life ==
Girija Devi was born in Varanasi, on 8 May 1929, to Ramdeo Rai, a zamindar. Her father played the harmonium and taught music, and had Girija Devi take lessons in singing khyal and tappa from vocalist and sarangi player Sarju Prasad Misra starting at the age of five. She starred in the movie Yaad rahe aged nine and continued her studies under Chand Misra in a variety of styles.

== Performing career ==
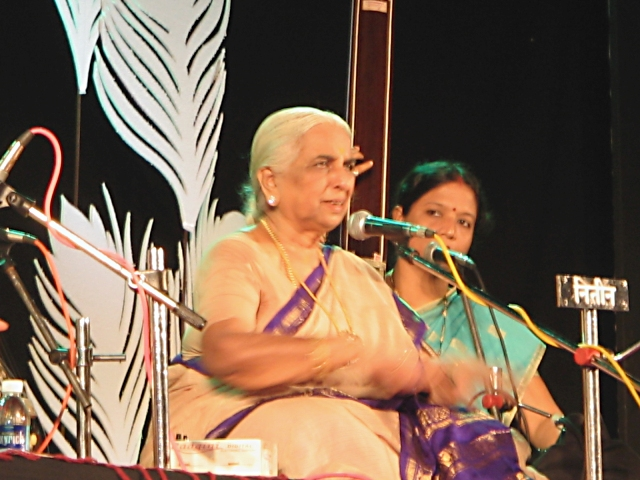
Devi in 2006

Girija Devi made her public debut in 1949 on All India Radio Allahabad, after marrying a businessman circa 1946, but faced opposition from her mother and grandmother due to the rigid social norms of the time, which dictated that women from upper-class families should not perform music in public. Girija Devi agreed not to perform privately for others, but gave her first public concert in Bihar in 1951. She studied with Sri Chand Misra until he died in the early 1960s, worked as a faculty member of the ITC Sangeet Research Academy in Kolkata in the 1980s and of the Banaras Hindu University during the early 1990s, and taught several students to preserve her musical heritage. Girija Devi often toured and continued to perform in 2009.

Girija Devi sang in the Banaras gharana and performed the purabi ang thumri style typical of the tradition, whose status she helped elevate. Her repertoire included the semi-classical genres kajri, chaiti, and holi and she sang khyal, Indian folk music, and tappa. The New Grove Dictionary of Music and Musicians once stated that her semi-classical singing combined her classical training with the regional characteristics of the songs of Bihar and eastern Uttar Pradesh.

She died on 24 October 2017 following a cardiac arrest at the BM Birla Heart Research Centre in Kolkata at the age of 88.

== Awards ==
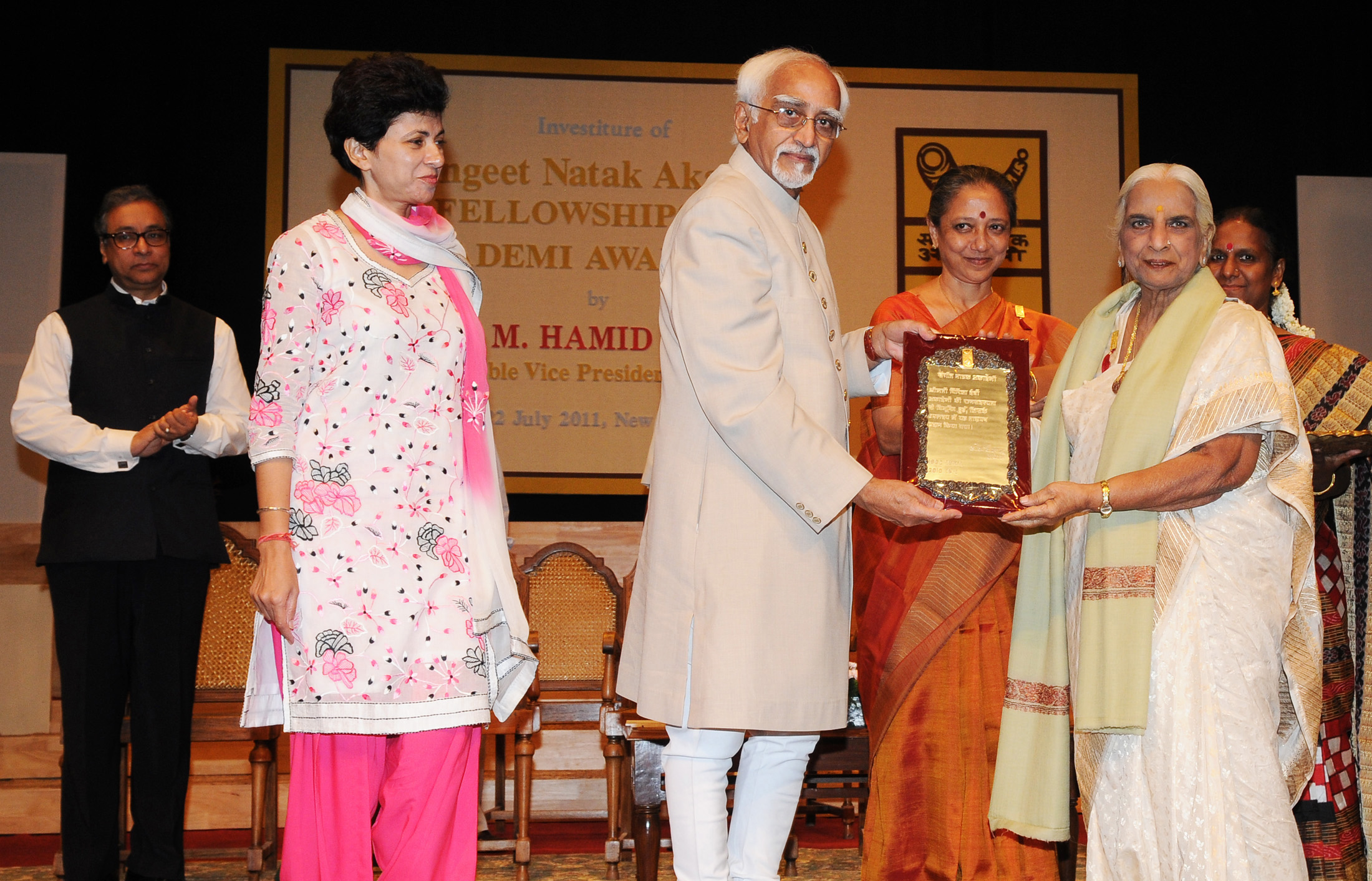
Mohd. Hamid Ansari presenting the Sangeet Natak Akademi Fellowship 2010 to Girija Devi, at the investiture ceremony of the Sangeet Natak Akademi Fellowships and Sangeet Natak Akademi Awards 2010

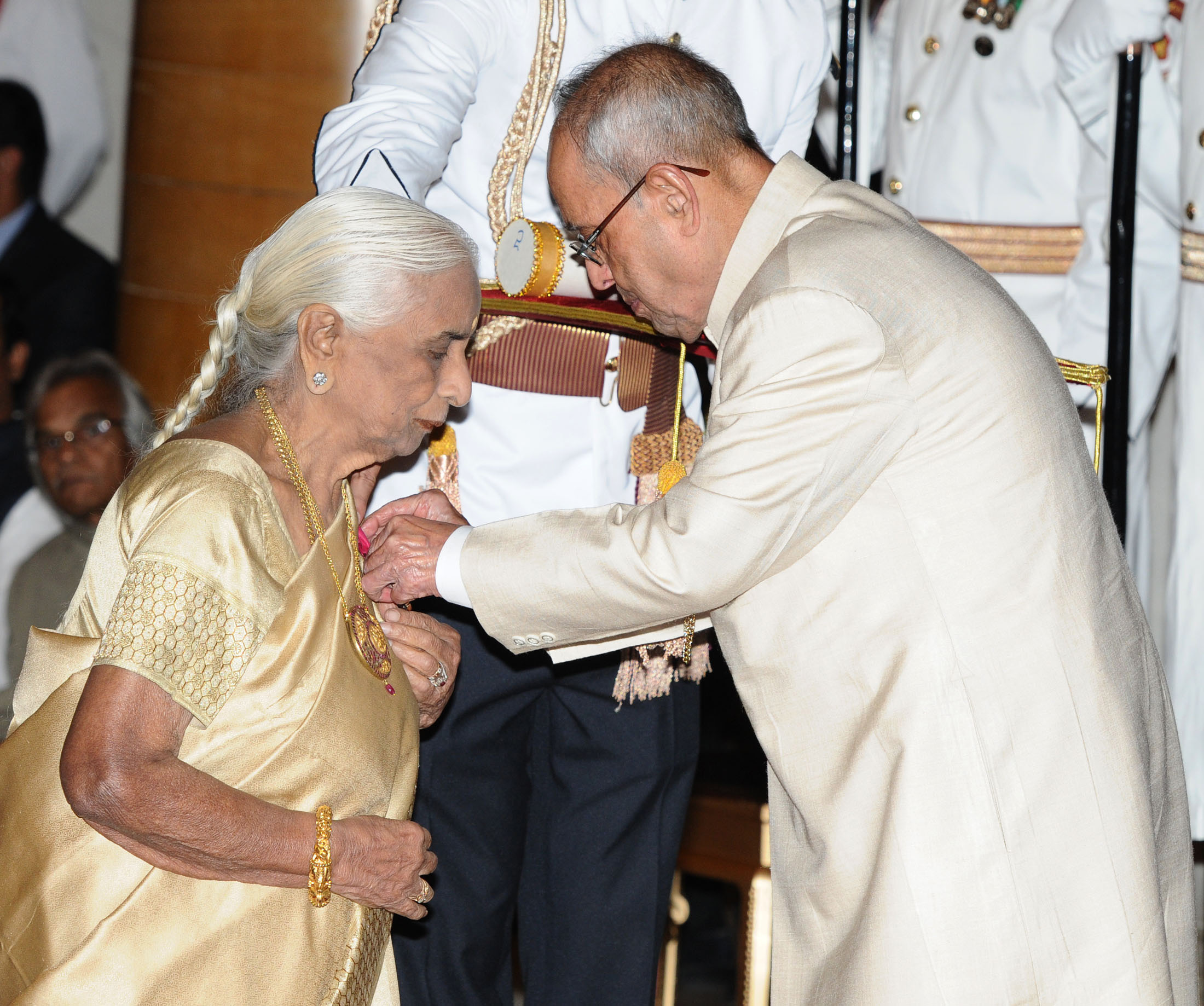
The President, Shri Pranab Mukherjee presenting the Padma Vibhushan Award to Dr. Girija Devi, at a Civil Investiture Ceremony, at Rashtrapati Bhavan, in New Delhi on April 12, 2016

- Padma Shri (1972)
- Padma Bhushan (1989)
- Padma Vibhushan (2016)
- Sangeet Natak Akademi Award (1977)
- Sangeet Natak Akademi Fellowship (2010)
- Maha Sangeet Samman Award (2012)
- Sangeet Samman Award ( Dover Lane Music Conference)
- GiMA Awards 2012 (Lifetime Achievement)
- TanaRiri Puraskar
