= Hori (music) =

Semi-classical singing genre from India

- Stylistic origins: Folk music; Devotional; Semi-classical
- Cultural origins: Braj Region
- Typical instruments: Dholak; Taal; Harmonium

Hori refers to a genre of folk songs in Braj Bhasa traditionally sung during the Holi festival, particularly in the Braj region of Uttar Pradesh in India. These songs are an integral part of the Holi festivities and contribute significantly to the celebratory atmosphere.

== Themes and Significance ==
Hori songs often depict the playful and romantic interactions between Krishna and Radha, key deities in Hindu mythology, whose stories are deeply embedded in the cultural fabric of the Braj region. The lyrics frequently allude to the throwing of colors and the joyous spirit of the festival. These compositions are mainly based on the love pranks of ‘Radha-Krishna’ known for its connection with Vrindavan, the native place of Lord Krishna.

== Musical Characteristics ==
Characterized by lively rhythms and melodies, Hori songs are often accompanied by traditional Indian instruments like the dholak, manjira, and harmonium. The call-and-response structure is common. In classical renditions, Hori follows the Dhrupad form, set to the 14-beat Dhamaar tala. These versions showcase tempo variations (dugun, tigun, chaugun) and precise raga development. Semi-classical Hori incorporates elements of Thumri, often using lighter talas. When Dhamaar is sung in lighter talas and in a semi-classical repertoire incorporating elements of Thumri, the resulting composition is also known as Hori. Raga Kafi, known for its passionate character, is frequently used, especially in semi-classical and Thumri styles.

== Regional Variations ==
While originating in the Braj region, variations of Hori songs are also found in other parts of North India, including Uttar Pradesh, Madhya Pradesh, Bihar, and regions further east. Mathura, Ayodhya and Kashi are 3 major centers for Hori. These regional variations often reflect local dialects, musical styles, and specific traditions associated with Holi celebrations. The traditionally sung Horis often describe Krishna's celebrations, romance with Radha, and pranks with the gopis, depicting the Shringara Rasa (romantic love) with underlying devotion. "Holi khelat Nand Lal" is a traditional example.

== Preservation and Contemporary Relevance ==
Although Hori remains a vibrant part of Holi festivities in many areas, there are concerns about the preservation of its traditional forms, especially in urban settings. Efforts to document and promote Hori songs are crucial for ensuring the continuation of this rich cultural tradition.

== Hori in Bollywood ==
Shailaja Tripathi of The Hindu observed, "Holi khele raghubira Awadh mein from the film Baghban and the hugely popular Rang barse are ulharas which have their roots in Awadh. In the film Kati Patang, the Holi song Aaj na choddenge bas humjoli has shades of Dhamar. This form begins with a slow tempo but as it progresses it becomes extremely fast. Holi aayi re kanhai from Mother India is a hori but interestingly has a kajri tune."
