= Kajari =

Folk song of eastern Uttar Pradesh

Kajari is a folk song and dance form from Bhojpuri region of Uttar Pradesh and Bihar. It is one of the Hindustani semi-classical music genre, performed during the rainy season usually late June to September when lush greenery reappears and agricultural labor begins again. Kajari derives from word kaajar or kohl. It is primarily sung in Uttar Pradesh and parts of western Bihar.

Kajari fall in the category of folk songs and are set in the semi-classical mold. The tradition of the Kajari originated in Bhojpuri region and maintained and brought into the classical fold by musicians from the Benares gharana school, such as Rasoolan Bai, Sidhdheshwari Devi, and Girija Devi. Kajari is celebrated as a festival in Mirzapur. It is also sung in nearby Awadhi-speaking areas.

Kajari dwell on such themes as the separation of women from their beloved, for it is believed that the gloom cast by the rains intensifies their feeling of loneliness. In these songs are highlighted the moods and pangs of separation of the women, and the rains are said to evoke in them a longing for their beloved. The kaga (crow) is often described as a messenger carrying a message to the Pardeshi Sainya (that is, the lover) in faraway lands.

== Notable contributors ==
- Lachhimi Sakhi : Bhojpuri saint-poet of the Sakhi Sampradaya from Gopalganj, Bihar. His literary works include Kajari compositions, along with devotional poetry associated with the Sakhi tradition.
- Lal Khadag Bahadur Malla : Bhojpuri writer, poet and ruler of Majhauli Raj (present-day Deoria district, Uttar Pradesh), whose Sudhabund (1884) is a collection of 60 Kajari songs.
- Mahendar Misir : Bhojpuri poet, folk singer and freedom fighter from Saran district, Bihar, known for his Kajari compositions.
- Pandit Beniram – Bhojpuri poet and composer from Banaras, Uttar Pradesh, and a contemporary of Bhartendu Harishchandra, who composed Kajari songs, including Kajari Bidesiya in the 1860s.
- Bhikhari Thakur : Bhojpuri poet, playwright and folk artist from Kutubpur, Saran district, Bihar, who composed Kajari songs.

A monsoon-season (Kajari-style) rice-transplanting folk song
