= Chupke Chupke =

Chupke Chupke (lit. 'Silently, Silently') may refer to:

- Chupke Chupke (film), a 1975 Indian Hindi-language comedy film by Hrishikesh Mukherjee
- Chupke Chupke, an Indian Hindi-language television series aired on &TV
- Chupke Chupke (TV series), a 2021 Pakistani television series
- "Chupke Chupke" or "Chupke Chupke Raat Din", a ghazal poem by Hasrat Mohani, later recorded by Ghulam Ali and featured in the 1982 Indian film Nikaah

== See also ==
- Chup Chup Ke, a 2006 Indian film by Priyadarshan
- Chupki, village in Punjab, India
