= Katiyabaaz =

2013 Indian movie

- Directed by: Deepti Kakkar; Fahad Mustafa
- Story by: Fahad Mustafa
- Produced by: Globalistan Films; ITVS
- Starring: Loha Singh; Ritu Maheshwari
- Cinematography: Maria Trieb; Amith Surendran; Fahad Mustafa
- Edited by: Namrata Rao; Maria Trieb
- Music by: Indian Ocean (Amit Kilam and Rahul Ram); Nora Kroll-Rosenbaum; Varun Grover (lyrics); Gingger Shankar (background score)
- Release dates: February 2013 (Berlin); 22 August 2014 (India)
- Running time: 84 minutes
- Country: India
- Language: Hindi/English
- Budget: ₹1 crore (US$100,000)

Katiyabaaz (English: Electricity Thief, however this fails to capture the pun in the Hindi title), released under the alternate title Powerless for English-speaking audiences, is a 2013 Indian Hindi documentary film directed by Deepti Kakkar and Fahad Mustafa about the problem of power theft in Kanpur. Released in India on 22 August 2014, the film is shot in Kanpur city, which faces long power cuts, giving rise to the profession of Loha Singh, a local electricity thief or katiyabaaz in localities like Chaman Ganj. He provides illegal electricity connections to people, while Ritu Maheshwari, MD of KESCo, Kanpur Electricity Supply Company, tries to tackle the issue of rampant electricity theft.

The film premiered at the Berlin International Film Festival 2013 and later won the Best Film in the India Gold Section at the 15th Mumbai Film Festival. At the 61st National Film Awards the film won the ward for Best Investigative Film. Katiyabaaz premiered on American television on Independent Lens - PBS on 3 November 2014.

== Plot ==
Katiyabaaz is a story of Kanpur's electricity crisis, resulting in loadshedding. Power cuts of up to 15 hours a day cause great trouble to residents and factories alike. This gap in supply and demand becomes the bedrock of local electricity thieves like Loha Singh, who provide illegal power connection to people, by plugging into the official supply through live wires. However such free connection causes heavy financial losses to the power supply company, whose MD struggles to fight the menace of power theft, and local fixers. The film follows Loha Singh, an electricity thief, and Ritu Maheshwari, an official with Kanpur Electricity Supply Company.

== Production ==
The film was made on a small budget of ₹1 crore (US$100,000) and had music by fusion rock band Indian Ocean who composed and sang the song Kanpoora for the film. The film was shot over a period of nearly two years, with a crew of 10-12 people. Instead of staying at hotels, the crew rented a bungalow and furnished it, which was economical.

The film's co-director, Fahad Mustafa, originally from Kanpur, researched the subject for six months before he started filming. However, they came across Loha Singh, the "katiyabaaz" (electricity thief) around whom the film is based, only after the shooting had already started and another katiyabaaz had backed out at the last moment. Loha Singh, himself was initially apprehensive about allowing himself be filmed, as he thought it to be a sting operation on his work or the crew to be of the Dabangg film series. The rumour about the latter, drew large crowds to filming locations, hampering production. The fact that some of the crew were foreigners also created much curiosity. Gradually Loha Singh and the locals became comfortable with the film crew. The crew shot candid conversations, several individual stories and the crippling effects of electricity crisis in the area on the common man, local industries as well as small business owners.

== Release ==
After its premiere at the Berlin International Film Festival 2013, the film traveled to various film festivals including the Tribeca Film Festival, the Melbourne International Film Festival, the Motovun Film Festival and the London Raindance Film Festival.

The film received backing for commercial released when Phantom Films, co-owned by filmmaker Anurag Kashyap, Vikramaditya Motwane and Vikas Bahl, with funding from international sources, signed on to present the film. In end July, The film's trailer was released by director-producer Anurag Kashyap in Mumbai. The film was commercially released on 22 August 2014. It had a limited release across 50 screens in cities like Mumbai, Lucknow, Pune, Bangalore, Hyderabad and Kanpur.

== Reception ==
The film was very well received by both international and well as national press. The largest German national paper, Süddeutsche Zeitung, gave Katiyabaaz a fantastic review after its premiere at the Berlin International Film Festival. According to Tom Brook from BBC's Talking Movies, "the filmmakers very effectively bring what could be rather dry subject to life". Aarti Virani wrote in The New York Times that the film was "a jarring glimpse at India’s rampant energy crisis". Abhimanyu Das wrote an extensive article about the film, Creatures of Light and Darkness in the Caravan magazine.

Deepanjana Pal of Firstpost called the film a "beautifully-shot documentary". Leading film critics gave it glowing reviews. Rajeev Masand called it a "Slice of Life" film. Anupama Chopra referred to it as a "sad love letter to Kanpur". Mihir Fadnavis reviewed the film for DNA India, where he called it "more hilarious, insightful and gorgeous than a feature film". Mumbai's leading lifestyle website, Mumbai Boss, called Katiyabaaz a "crackling documentary!"

On 28 August 2014, the Government of Uttar Pradesh exempted the film from entertainment tax and also directed engineers of state power department to watch the film and "draw inspiration to stop illegal connections".
