= Sajjad Ali =

Pakistani singer, poet, actor, film director and producer (born 1966)

Sajjad Ali سجاد علی SI
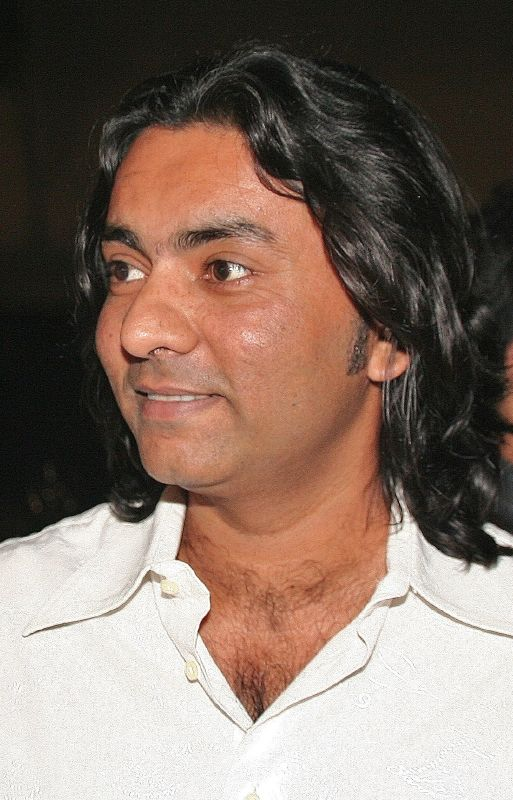

Background information
- Also known as: Sajjad Bhai, Gagi bhai
- Born: Sajjad Ali; 1966 (age 59–60); Karachi, Pakistan
- Origin: Karachi
- Genres: Classical; semi-classical; pop; rock
- Occupations: Singer-songwriter; musician
- Instruments: Vocals; piano
- Years active: 1979–present
- Labels: EMI-Pakistan; Sound Master

Sajjad Ali (born 1966) is a Pakistani semi-classical, pop and rock singer, poet, actor, film director as well as a film producer from Karachi, Pakistan.

== Early life and education ==
His father, Shafqat Hussain (Sajan), was a Pakistani film actor and cricketer, who appeared for the first time in the 1971 film Badal Aur Bijli (lit. Clouds and Lightening). Sajjad completed his F.A. degree from National Arts College, Karachi and later studied piano at the University of Karachi. After that, his uncle, Tassaduq Hussain started teaching music to him with his classical music collections.

During Sajjad's training, Hussain played music from classical artists such as Ustad Bade Ghulam Ali Khan, Ustad Barkat Ali Khan and Ustad Mubarak Ali Khan who were all Sajjad Ali's grand-uncles also. He was also briefly trained by his uncle Ustad Munawar Ali Khan from India who himself was the son of Ustad Bade Ghulam Ali Khan. Sajjad Ali belongs to the Kasur Patiala Gharana of classical musicians. He has family roots in Patiala (now Punjab, India) and began singing at the age of 7.

== Career ==
=== Music ===
Sajjad Ali's first classical hit album, Master Sajjad Sings Memorable Classics was released in 1979 by EMI-Pakistan. The musicians were Ustad Ghulam Ali (singer), Mehdi Hassan, Ghulam Ali and Amanat Ali Khan, while most of Sajjad Ali's songs were renditions of poetry by Hasrat Mohani, Momin and others.

Sajjad made his television debut in many programs before his debut program, Aap Janab by Athar Shah Khan. After this, he appeared in Rung Barangi Duniya by musician Sohail Rana. He also performed in the program Rag Rung in 1980 at the age of 14. He became famous at the 25th anniversary of PTV's stage show, called Silver Jubilee by Shoaib Mansoor, by singing the song "Banwari Chakori", originally sung by Noor Jehan. On 26 November 1983 during a show, Sajjad sung the songs "Lagi Ray Lagay Lagan Yehe Dil Mein" and "Bawari Chakuri".

He produced the music albums Babia 93, Chief Saab and Sohni Lag Di.

Sajjad Ali performs at the launch of a US sponsored music video to promote health awareness about mothers and newborns.

His brother Waqar Ali is also in the music industry. Sajjad, along with his brother, wrote lyrics for most of the songs in his albums, while lyricists Sabir Zafar, Mohammad Nasir, Nadeem Asad, and Ali Moin have also written some songs.

In July 2006, Sajjad released a single called "Chal Rein De", a more classical song. On 3 September 2006, he released another single in a totally different genre with the help of Meloscience Corp. The song is known as "Sajjad-Ali Sinsym Fligh", and it has an experimental, jazzy, Sufi beat. In late April 2008, Sajjad released his album, Chahar Balish, which contained new tracks as well as some previous tracks such as "Chal Rein De".

Two new compositions of Sajjad Ali from the film Bol by Shoaib Mansoor were released by Tips music on 22 May 2011 in India and on 30 May 2011 by Fire Records in Pakistan. He also appeared in the second episode of Coke Studio with his song "Kir Kir", which was broadcast on major television channels across Pakistan on 5 June 2011.

In 2017, Sajjad released his single with Bohemia (rapper) (Tamasha), a massive hit on YouTube and social media. It was his first collaboration.

=== Films and television ===
Sajjad directed his first telefilm, Love Letter in 1989, and then his first full-length motion picture, Aik Aur Love Story in 1998. Before that, he also performed as an actor and a singer in a film, Munda Tera Deewana which was directed by Zahoor Husain Gillani. Sajjad has also sung songs for drama serials, Teri Yaad (Album) in the PTV drama serial Thori Khushi Thora Ghum, "Na Boloon Gi" in Na Tum Jano Na Hum Janain (ARY Digital) and "Sunn Leyna" in Sunn Leyna (ARY Digital). His brother Waqar Ali is also credited with the making of these songs.

Sajjad composed songs in Shoaib Mansoor's 2011 film Bol. Sajjad stated that the songs were recorded in his own studio in Dubai and by the name of Din Pareshan hai, having two versions. According to Sajjad Ali this song is different from the song in his album Chahar Balish which also has the same title.

=== Critical acclaim ===
Musician A. R. Rahman has described Sajjad as the original crossover: "From the realm of the classical, he metamorphosed into one of the brightest lights of Pakistani pop. Always striking the right note, and never missing a beat, even the most hardened purist has to give Sajjad his due. This man can breathe life in a Ghazal even as he puts the V back into verve. He is one of the few singers in Pakistan who seems a complete singer. As far as skill is concerned I feel nobody compares to Sajjad Ali. He is simply too good at everything he chooses to create."

== Personal life ==
Sajjad married his uncle's daughter Naureen in 1990. They have four children; two sons and two daughters. He lives in Dubai Marina, United Arab Emirates with his family, where he has been based for many years.

His daughter Zaw Ali is a singer and film maker and has featured in Coke Studio Pakistan, in 2017 singing "Ronay Na Diya" alongside Sajjad Ali for season 10. His son Khubi Ali launched his professional music career in 2021 with the single Udaas, a rendition of Sajjad's 2005 track. His other son Shabi Ali is a musician as well.

His two brothers, Waqar Ali and Lucky Ali, have also made a name in the Pakistan music industry.

== Discography ==
=== Albums ===
Title	Tracks listing	Released	Label
Master Sajjad Sings Memorable Classics	1. Aaye Na Balam, آۓ نہ بالم; 2. Yaad Piya Ki Aaye, یاد پیا کی آۓ; 4. Tori Tirchi Najarya Kay Baan, توری ترچھی نجریا کے بان; 5. Maran Mithon Galri, مارن مٹھون گالڑی; 6. Bajuband Khul Khul Jaye, باجو بند کھل جاۓ; 7. Baghoon Main Paday Jhoolay, باغوں میں پڑے جھولے; 8. Dekh To Dil, دیکھ تو دل; 9. Jin Ke Hontoon Pay, جن کے ہونٹوں پے; 10. Chaltay Ho To Chaman, چلتے ہو تو چمن; 11. Chupkay Chupkay Raat Din, چپکے چپکے رات دن; 12. Nawek Andaz Jidhar, ناوک انداذ	1979	EMI-PAKISTAN TC-EMCP-5114
Goldies Not Oldies	1. Nahin Mila, نہیں ملا; 2. Zindagi Hai, ذندگی ہے دھواں; 3. Kya Saman Hai, کیا سماء ہے; 4. Aatey Rahain, آتی رہی ہوائیں; 5. Teri Yaad, تیری یاد ستاۓ; 6. Chala Main Wahan, چلا میں وہاں; 7. Pyar Ki Rahoon, پیار کی راہوں; 8. Bahoon Main, باہوں میں آجا; 9. Na Janain, نا جانیں میں کہاں کھو گیا ہوں; 10. Tum Ho Jahan, بم ہو جہاں; 11. Bewafa tou, بیوفا تو; 12. Meray Dil Main, میرے دل میں	1987	EMI-PAKISTAN TC-CEMCP-5783
Love Letter	1. Aik Baat Purani, ایک بات پرانی; 2. Jal Pari, جل پری; 3. Tum Narazz Ho, تم ناراض ہو; 4. Nahin Mila, نہی ملا; 5. Be Wafa, بیوفا; 6. Gaate Rahen, گاتے رہیں; 7. Khirki Main Woh(Vicky), کھڑکی میں وہ آ گئ(وکی); 8. Yeh Baat, یہ بات; 9. Ruksana, رخسانہ; 10. Love Letter, لو لیٹر; 11. Kahan Kahan, کہاں کہاں ڈھونڈا نہیں; 12. Daman Lagian, دامن لگیاں مولا	1990	EMI-PAKISTAN TC-CEMCP-6030
Silver Jubilee Star Sajjad Ali	1. Jaa ray uur ja ray panchi, جا رے' اڑ جا رے پنچھی; 2. Bolay ray papiha, بولے رے پاپیہہ; 3. Sanwaray Sanwaray, سانورے'سانورے; 4. A ree aa raay piya bin, اے ری آرے پیا بن; 5. Pawan dewani, پون دیوانی; 6. A reھ pawan, اے ری پون; 7. Nindia na aay, نندیا نہ آۓ; 8. Moray nainaan sawan, مورے نینا ساون; 9. Poocho na kaisay, پوچھو نہ کیسے; 10. Baiyan na, بیاں نہ; 11. Aab kay na sawan barsay, اب کے نہ ساون برسے; 12. Hai jia roay, ہاۓ جیا روۓ; 13. Rena beeti jai, رینا بیتی جاۓ; 14. Chanda ray, چندا رے; 15. Piya mein to hoi banwari, پیا میں تو ہوئی بانوری; 16.Akhiyan sang aakhian, اکھی ین سنگ اکھیاں 17.Nainoon mein badra chaay, نینوں میں بدرا چھاۓ	–	Universal Recording Company URC-
Sajjad Ali in Gold Sartaj Geet Vol-2	Not Available	–	PMC-1930
Golden Jubilee-2 Sajjad Ali Vol-2	Not Available	–	PMC-1930
Golden Jubilee-84 Sajjad Ali	Not Available	–	–
Sajjad Ali Humaira Channa Vol-3	Not Available	–	–
Diamond Jubilee	Not Available	–	ARC GOLD ARC-1960
Remix Sajjad Ali	Not Available	–	PMC GOLD PMC-3879
Sajjad Ali Vol-1	Not Available	1985	SONIC ENTERPRISES
Sajjad Ali Vol-2	Not Available	1986	SONIC ENTERPRISES
Wachan	1. Wachan, 2. Tony Ki Party, 3. Saath Saath, 4. Kia Saman Hai, 5. Yeh Kaisay Sehr Main, 6. Kehkashan, 7. Chalo Chaltay Hain, 8. Dil Layna, 9. Teri Yaad Satay, 10. Jaab Koe Mushkil, 11. Kya Saman Hai(Reno), 12. Poora Dukh Aur Adha Chand	1990	SRC-1021
Babia 93	1. Babia, 2. Chal Uddja, 3. Kuch Larrkiyan, 4. Bolo Bolo, 5. Pani ki Chadaron se, 6. Rap, 7. Neeli Neeli, 8. Teetli Jaisa Pyar, 9. Aisa Laga, 10. Boliyann, 11. Bolo Bolo Ali Ali	1993	Sound Master SM-100
Chief Saab	1. Chief Saab; 2. Mahiwal, 3. Bul Bul, 4. Yaad, 5. Naraz, 6. Rikshay, 7. IM Back, 8. Mano, 9. Ali Ali, 10. Tum, 11. Mehndi	1995	Sound Master SM-240
Moody	1. Mood, 2. Chal Jhooti, 3. Jal Peri, 4. Naraz, 5. Aysa Laga, 6. Neeli Neeli, 7. Aab Kay Hum, 8. Daman Lagian Maula	1996	Sound Master SM-400
Munda tera dewana	Not Available	1996	SOUND MASTER SM-281
Aik Aur Love Story	1. Jhulay Laal, 2. Bhegay Mausam, 3. Kya Samaan Hai, 4. Patta bata Do, 5. Sohni Lag Di, 6. Lari Ada, 7. Marina Marina, 8. Dua Karo, 9. Pyaar Hai, 10. Theme	1998	Sound Master SM-600
Sohni Lag Di	1. Sohni Lag Di, 2. Larri Adda, 3. Jadoo (Remix), 4. Mahiwal, 5. Chief Saab, 6. Chal Jhoothi, 7. Mood Nahi Hai, 8. Chal Ud Ja, 9. Naraz, 10. Tum Say Pyar	1999	SOUND MASTER SM-612
Cinderella	1. Album Intro, 2. Cinderella, 3. Layan Layan, 4. Pahle Saal, 5. Payar Hai, 6. Sanwar De, 7. Sayane, 8. Tasvirain, 9. Toota Sapna (Aisa Laga Remix), 10. Wachan, 11. Paniyon Mein	2003	Sound Master SM-656
Teri Yaad	1. Teri Yaad	2004	Sound Master SM-
Koi to baat hoo...	1. Baghon Mein Pade Jhole, 2. Bane They Dost Dil Dukhane, 3. Har Zulam Tera Yaad Hai, 4. Jawani Zindagani Hai, 5. Koi To Baat Ho Aisi, 6. Mehkashi To Aazab Hoti Hai, 7. Meray Aangan Ko Ujalon Se, 8. Mujh Se Khushiyaan Le, 9. Saqiya Ek Nazar Kafi Hai, 10. Tum Aa Gay Ho To, 11. Woh Aaake Baithe They Pal	2002	PMC GOLD-44227
Sajjad's Rangeen	1. Koi Nahee, 2. Is Tarha, 3. Maaf Kia, 4. Na Bolloon Gi, 5. Chaad De, 6. Jeenay Do, 7. Yeh Zindagi, 8. Cheete Cheete, 9. Pehlay Saal, 10. Tasveerain, 11. Wachan	2005	Sound Master SM-747
Best of Sajjad Ali Collection 2	1. Cinderella, 2. Layan Layan, 3. Pata Bata Do, 4. Sohni Lagdi, 5. Lari Adda, 6. Yaad Tu, 7. Mahiwal, 8. Mehndi, 9. Bul Bul, 10. Mood, 11. Chal Jhooti, 12. Babia, 13. Panyuoon Main	2003	Sound Master SM-692
Chal Rein De	1. Chal Rein De, 2. Sun Lay Na, 3. Koe Naheen, 4. Teri Yaad, 5. Pehlay Saal, 6. Panyuoon Main, 7. Iss Terha, 8. IM Back, 9. Tesverain, 10. Aisa Laga, 11. Pehlay saal, 12. Maaf Kia, 13. Na Boloon Gi	2006	Sound Master SM-786
Chahar Balish	1. Pekar, 2. Rang Laga, 3. Gaddiye, 4. Katna Nai, 5. Nai Thakda, 6. Dil Pareshaan Hai, 7. Kia Naam Doon, 8. Chal Rein De, 9. Gaddiye (Club mix)	2008	Sound Master SM-786

=== Singles ===
- "Babia"(Inspied by Arabic song "Didi")
- "Chal Urrja"
- "Kuch Larrkiyan Mujhe"
- "Chief Saab"
- "Mahiwal"
- "Tasvirain"
- "Jadoo"
- "Abhi Mood Nahi Hai"
- "Jhullay Lal"
- "Chal Jhooti"
- "Pyar Hai"
- "Charsi Hon Mai"
- "Lari Adda"
- "Pata Bata do"
- "Paniyon Mein"
- "Sohni Lag Di"
- "Cinderella"
- "Teri Yaad"
- "Aisa Laga"
- "Koi Nahin"
- "Cheti Cheti"
- "Na Boloon Gi (Rangeen)"
- "Chal Rein De" (July 2006)
- "Pekar" (2008)
- "Din Pareshan Hai" (2011)
- "KirKir KirKir" (2011)
- "Rung Laga feat Sanam Marvi (Duet)" (2011)
- "Qeemay Aalay Pooray" (2012)
- "Har Zulm Tera Yaad Hay"
- "Tasveer Bana Ke"
- "Bhoola Naa Ye Dil" for Meri Beti (2013)
- "Yaad Tu Ati Hogi"
- "Tum Naraz Ho"
- "Na Tum Samjhe" (2015)
- "Naakhun" (2016)
- "Tamasha", Sajjad Ali ft Bohemia (2017)
- "Lagaya Dil (2018)"
- "Bhejo Darood o Salam" (2019)
- "RAVI"(2019)
- "Barish"(2020)
- "DOST" (2020)
- " SANWAR DE " (2021)
- " INTEZAR " Official Audio (2021)
- "QARAR " (2022)
- "Aatish " (2022)
- Salami (2023)
- Door Gayun (2023)
- Chehre (2023)
- Kya Sama Hai (2023)

== Filmography ==
=== As composer ===
- Love Letter (1990)
- Aik Aur Love Story (1999)
- Mujhe Chand Chahiye (2000)
- Bol (2011)
- Na Maloom Afraad (2014)

=== As director ===
- Love Letter(1989)
- Aik Aur Love Story (1999)

=== As actor ===
- Love Letter (1989)
- Munda Tera Deewana (1996)
- Aik Aur Love Story (1999)

== See also ==
- List of Lollywood actors
