= Master Sajjad Sings Memorable Classics =

Studio album by Sajjad Ali
- Released: 1979
- Genre: Classical - semi-classical
- Label: EMI-Pakistan TC-EMCP-5114
- Producer: EMI-Pakistan

Sajjad Ali chronology
Chahar Balish	Master Sajjad Sings Memorable Classics

Master Sajjad Sings Memorable Classics is the debut album of Pakistani singer, songwriter, actor, director, musician, and composer Sajjad Ali. The album was released by EMI-Pakistan in 1979.

An audio sample of "Chupkay Chupkay Raat Din"

An audio sample of "Naweek Andaz"

An audio sample of "Aaye na baalam"

== Musicians ==
The musicians were:

- Ghulam Ali (singer)
- Mehdi Hassan
- Ghulam Ali
- Amanat Ali Khan

== Lyricist ==
The album lyrics were written by the famous Urdu poets

- Hasrat Mohani
- Momin

== Track listing ==
The album has 12 songs.

1. "Aaye Na Balam, آۓ نہ بالم"
2. "Yaad Piya Ki Aaye, یاد پیا کی آۓ"
3. "Nainan More Taras Rahe Hain, نینا مورے ترس رہے ہیں"
4. "Tori Tirchi Najarya Kay Baan, توری ترچھی نجریا کے بان"
5. "Maran Mithon Galri, مارن مٹھون گالڑی"
6. "Bajuband Khul Khul Jaye, باجو بند کھل کھل جاۓ"
7. "Baghoon Main Paday Jhoolay, باغوں میں پڑے جھولے"
8. "Dekh To Dil, دیکھ تو دل"
9. "Jin Ke Hontoon Pay, جن کے ہونٹوں پے"
10. "Chaltay Ho To Chaman, چلتے ہو تو چمن"
11. "Chupkay Chupkay Raat Din, چپکے چپکے رات دن"
12. "Nawek Andaz Jidhar, ناوک انداذ"
