= Ritu Maheshwari =

Indian Administrative Service officer

Ritu Maheshwari IAS
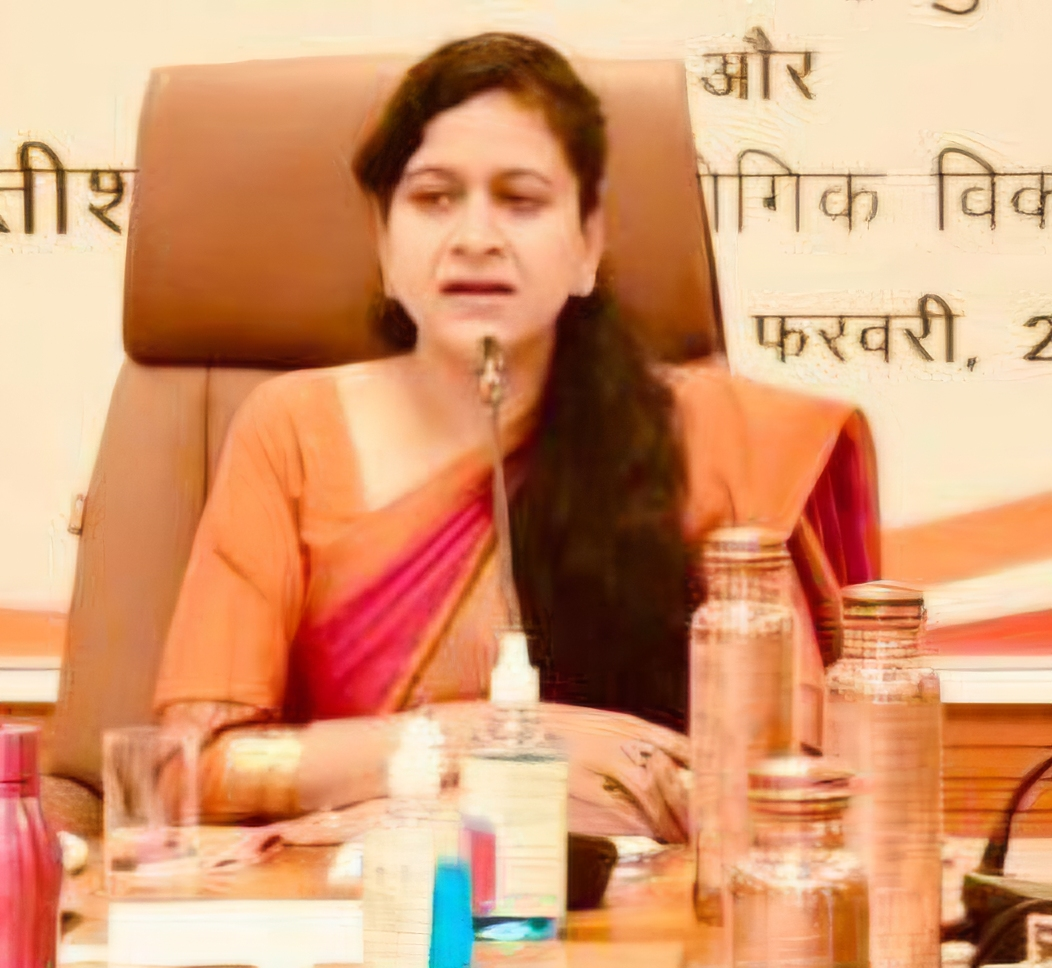
- Ritu Maheshwari

Secretary of Secretary Medical health and family welfare Government of Uttar Pradesh
- Incumbent
- Assumed office February 2025

Divisional Commissioner of Agra Division
- In office July 2023 – August 2025
- Preceded by: Amit Gupta

Chief Executive Officer of Noida Authority
- In office 2019 – July 2023
- Succeeded by: Lokesh M

Personal details
- Born: July 14, 1978 (age 48) Punjab, India
- Spouse: Mayur Maheshwar
- Parents: C.D. Singla (father); Saroj Singla (mother)
- Education: MBA (Executive Development); B.Tech (Electrical Engineering)
- Alma mater: Punjab Engineering College; Amity University, Noida
- Occupation: IAS officer, Civil servant

Ritu Maheshwari is an Indian Administrative Service officer serving as the Secretary of secretary medical health and family welfare for the Government of Uttar Pradesh since August 2025. She previously served as the Divisional Commissioner of Agra, Uttar Pradesh and as the chief executive officer of the New Okhla Industrial Development Authority She has also been the managing director of Noida Metro Rail Corporation.

== Early life ==
Ritu Maheshwari was born on 14 July 1978 in Punjab, India, to a Hindu family of C.D. Singla and Saroj Singla. She married Mayur Maheshwari, an IAS officer of the Uttar Pradesh cadre.

== Education ==
Ritu Maheshwari is from Punjab and completed her primary education at DAV Public School, Amritsar. She attended Punjab Engineering College and earned a Bachelor of Engineering in Electrical Engineering. Later, she joined pursued a Master of Business Administration in Executive Development from Amity University, Noida. Ritu comes from a family with a business background and is the first member of her family to join the civil services.

== Career ==
Ritu Maheshwari is a 2003 batch IAS officer. She started her career as a Joint Magistrate and Collector of Lucknow in 2005. In 2007, she held the post of District Magistrate and Collector of Ghazipur.

Ritu has also served as a chief executive officer of Noida and Greater Noida. Presently, she is serving as Divisional Commissioner of Agra.

She also served as the Divisional Commissioner of Agra Division from July 2023 to August 2025. During her tenure as the CEO of the Noida Authority, generated a record revenue of ₹7,000 crore in the financial year 2022-23 the highest in the preceding 12 years.

In February 2025 Ritu Maheshwari was appointed as the Secretary of Medical Education, Health and Family Welfare in the Government of Uttar Pradesh.

== Biographical film ==
Katiyabaaz (Electricity Thief) movie is based on Ritu Maheshwari's life when she worked in Kanpur as the managing director of Kanpur Electricity Supply Company.

== Awards and recognition ==
- United Nations Public Service Delivery Award (2012) for the innovative health project Aarogyam, a mother and child tracking programme.
- Uttar Pradesh State E-governance Award (2009–10) for the Udyog Bandhu – A Helping Hand for Entrepreneurs initiative.
- National E-Governance Award (2010–11).
- Finalist, Stockholm Challenge Award (2010) for the Aarogyam ICT-based digital health mapping programme.
- Cleanest Medium City Award and 5-Star Garbage-Free City Award (2021) for Noida by the Ministry of Housing and Urban Affairs, Government of India.
- Best Self-Sustainable Medium City Award for Noida (2022) by the Ministry of Housing and Urban Affairs, Government of India.
- Water Digest Water Reuse Award (2022–23) for Noida, in the World Water Awards sponsored jointly by UNESCO and the Government of India.
- Best Urban Development Project – greenfield development for dumpsite remediation in Noida, by Smart City–Empowering India Awards in collaboration with the Ministry of Housing and Urban Affairs, Government of India.
- Awarded as District Magistrate of Ghaziabad for steering the district to one of the Top 10 District Awards on World Toilet Day organised by the Ministry of Drinking Water and Sanitation, Government of India (2018).
- Awarded as District Magistrate of Ghaziabad for Best District in Urban Cleanliness in Uttar Pradesh by the State Government’s Department of Urban Development (2018).
- Awarded as Commissioner of Agra for Agra Smart City projects (social aspects, water, COVID-19 response, ICCC business models), securing overall second national rank in Smart City rankings 2023.
