= Agha Bismil =

Indian Urdu poet

- Occupation: Poet
- Writing career
- Genre: Ghazal
- Subjects: Love, philosophy

Agha Bismil is an Indian Urdu poet.

== Career ==
Agha Bismil's most popular ghazal is Mehfil Mein Baar Baar, which was made popular by Ghulam Ali.
