= Electricity theft =

Criminal practice of stealing electrical energy

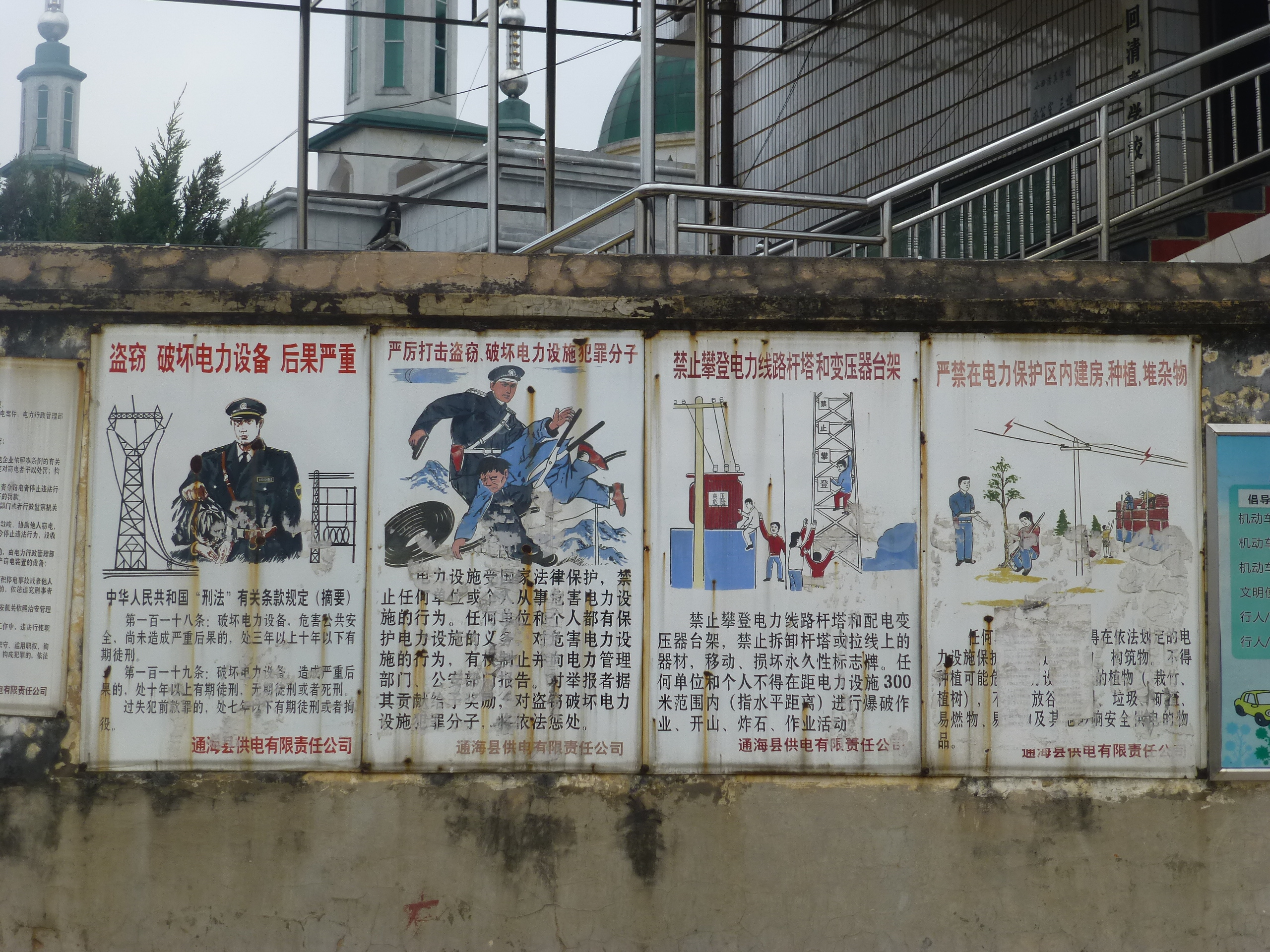
Posters explaining the illegality of the theft of electric cables, outside of a mosque in Tonghai County, Yunnan.

Electricity theft is the criminal practice of stealing electrical power. The practice of stealing electricity is nearly as old as electricity distribution. Electricity theft is accomplished via a variety of means, from methods as rudimentary as directly hooking to a power line, to manipulation of computerized electrical meters. Electricity theft is most common in developing countries where power grids deliver inadequate and unreliable power. The global cost of electricity theft was estimated at $96 billion every year. Some punishments for the crime include fines and incarceration. The electricity losses caused by the theft are classified as non-technical losses.

== History ==
On March 27, 1886 it was reported that electricity espionage was accomplished by unscrupulous persons tapping into Edison Electricity in New York. The Superintendent of the power station sent a power surge into the line to burn out or destroy foreign objects trespassing on the line.

== Types ==
A cluster of illegal electrical connections that have been directly hooked from the main electrical line short-circuiting.

There are various types of electrical power theft, including Tapping a line or bypassing the energy meter. According to a study, 80% of worldwide theft occurs in private dwellings and 20% on commercial and industrial premises. The various types of electrical power theft include:

=== Direct hooking from line ===
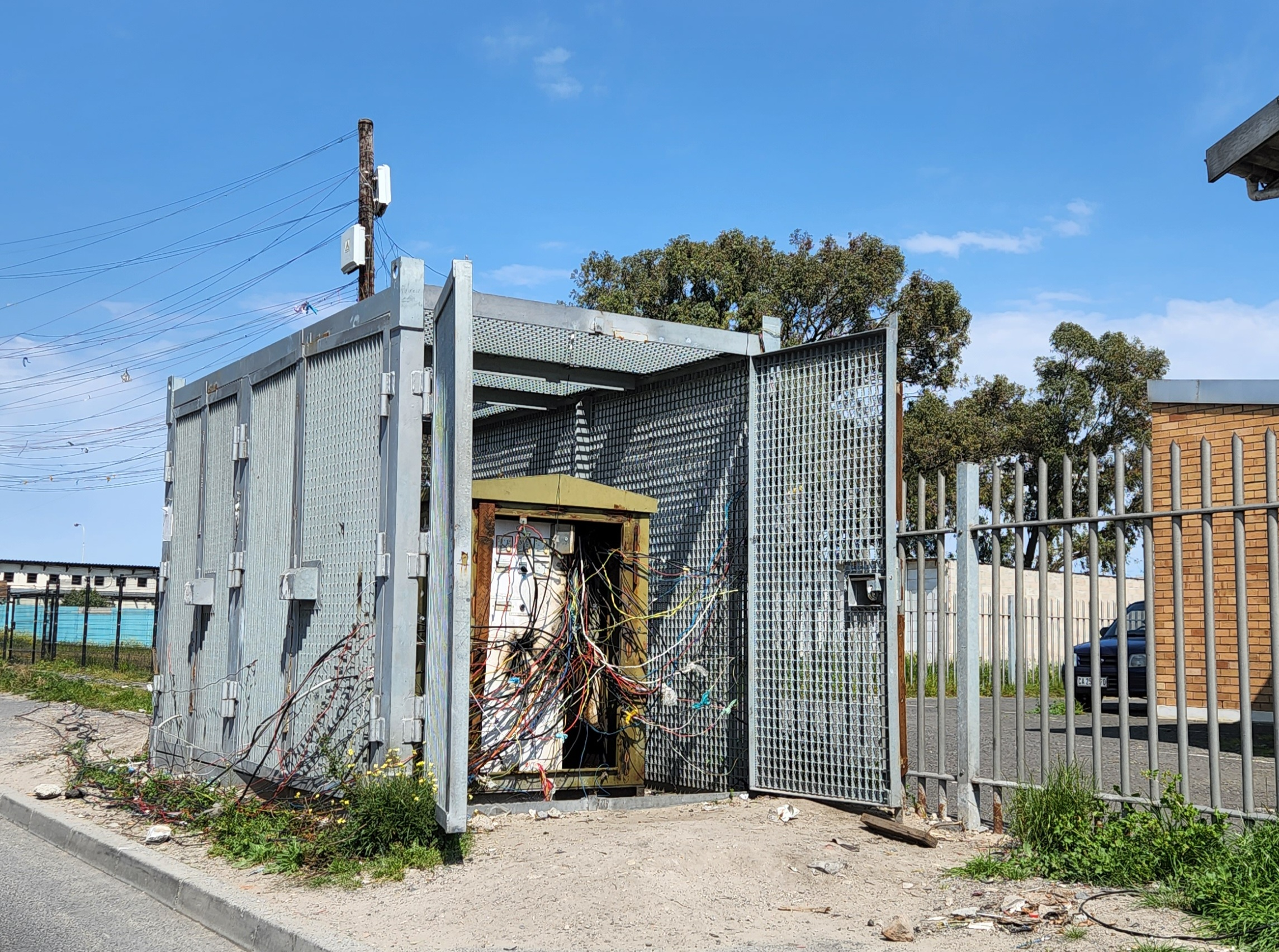
An electrical utility power box that has been forced open to allow electricity to be illegally accessed by directly hooking it from the line.

What's known as "cable hooking" is the most used method. 80% of global power theft is by direct tapping from the line. The consumer taps into a power line from a point ahead of the energy meter. This energy consumption is unmeasured and procured with or without switches. It can cause severe electric shock or fire outbreak.

=== Bypassing the energy meter ===
In this method, the input terminal and output terminal of the energy meter is bridged, preventing the energy from registering in the energy meter.

=== Injecting foreign element in the energy meter ===
Meters are manipulated via a remote by installing a circuit inside the meter so that the meter can be slowed down at any time. This kind of modification can evade external inspection attempts because the meter is always correct unless the remote is turned on.

=== Physical obstruction ===
This type of tampering is done to electromechanical meters with a rotating element. Foreign material is placed inside the meter to obstruct the free movement of the disc. A slower rotating disk signals less energy consumption.

=== ESD attack on electronic meter ===
ESD tampering is done on electronic meter to make it either latent damage or permanent damage. Detection can be done correctly in high end meters only.

== Detection ==
A number of approaches to detect electricity theft have been proposed. The predominant direction in research and development is employing artificial intelligence, and in particular machine learning methods, to detect customers that steal electricity.

== By country ==
According to the annual Emerging Markets Smart Grid: Outlook 2015 study by the Northeast Group, LLC, the world loses US$89.3 billion annually to electricity theft. The highest losses were in India ($16.2 billion), followed by Brazil ($10.5 billion) and Russia ($5.1 billion).

=== Brazil ===
Brazil is South America's largest single energy user, accounting for around 36% of total energy consumption. The incidence of energy theft is roughly 15%, and it exceeds 50% in the country's north. Electricity theft cost BRL 6.5 billion (about €1.15 billion) in 2020 alone.

=== India ===
President of Northeast Group Ben Gardner stated: "India loses more money to theft than any other country in the world. The state of Maharashtra—which includes Mumbai—alone loses $2.8 billion per year, more than all but eight countries in the world. Nationally, total transmission and distribution losses approach 23% and some states' losses exceed 50%."

=== Pakistan ===
In Karachi, a parallel power supply has been running for years as a result of electricity theft. In 2013, it was declared in the Senate of Pakistan, that Pakistan had lost Rs90 billion (equivalent to ₨149.1 billion in 2021) in the last 5 years to electricity theft and line losses.

=== Turkey ===
In Turkey electricity theft is mainly concentrated in the Southeastern and Eastern Anatolia regions, meanwhile in the Aegean Region it has the lowest prevalence. Dicle and Van Gölü companies were the most heavily affected electricity distributors in the country. In 2020 Mardin (72.7%), Şırnak (70.9%) and Diyarbakır (65.4%) provinces have had the highest use of stolen electricity. In contrast Denizli (1.3%) have had the lowest prevalence among Turkish provinces with regard to electricity theft.

The cost of the electricity theft is compensated nationally, where users in every province pay an equal amount of electricity theft tax, independent from the prevalence of theft in respective province. Since 2013 there had been efforts to regionalize the theft tax, but these were not implemented. The national tax system is planned to be continued until the end of 2025.

== In popular culture ==
Katiyabaaz (Powerless), a 2014 Indian documentary film, dealt with issue of power theft in the city of Kanpur, Uttar Pradesh.

== See also ==
- Electricity theft in Pakistan
- Metal theft of the cables that carry electricity
