= Salma Agha =

British actress and singer (born 1954)

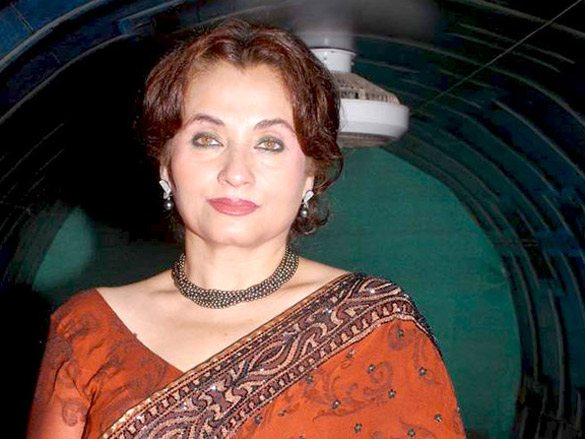
- Salma Agha at an event in 2011
- Born: 25 October 1956 (age 70); Rawalpindi, Punjab, Pakistan
- Citizenship: United Kingdom
- Occupations: Singer, actress
- Years active: 1974–present
- Spouses: Jawed Sheikh (m. 1981; div. 1987) Rahmat Khan (m. 1989; div. 2010) Manzar Shah (m. 2011)
- Children: Zara Khan
- Family: Agha family

Salma Agha (born 25 October 1956) is a British singer and actress who worked in Indian and Pakistani films and in the 1980s and the early 1990s. She is best known for her acting and singing the song "Dil ke Armaan" in the film Nikaah (1982).

== Early life ==
She was born and raised in Rawalpindi and later moved to Karachi. After marrying Javed Ameer, she moved to Brussels, Belgium. Her family later relocated to London. Following her divorce from Javed Ameer, she also moved to London.

Salma's father was a tradesman dealing in rugs and belonged to an Urdu-speaking Pashtun family from Amritsar. Agha traces the origin of her surname 'Aagha' to her Pashtun ancestors from Afghanistan. Her father traded in precious stones and antiques in Iran. He was given the title Aagha there, an honorific given to a businessman of repute."

Her mother, a musician, was the daughter of music composer Rafiq Ghaznavi and his wife Anwari Bai Begum, who was one of the earliest actresses of Indian cinema, starring in Heer Ranjha (1932). Anwari and Rafiq Ghaznavi separated after Nasreen's birth, and Anwari then married an Indian businessman named Jugal Kishore Mehra, who legally adopted Nasreen. Mehra was a Punjabi Hindu who converted to Islam and took the name Ahmed Salman and later moved to Pakistan after the partition of India.

Mehra was a first cousin of Indian actors Raj Kapoor, Shammi Kapoor and Shashi Kapoor of the Kapoor family, because their mother, Ramsarni Kapoor (née Mehra), was the sister of his father.

Raj Kapoor, who met Agha in London when she was young saw her and was interested in casting her in his film Henna. However, Mehra, Agha's maternal grandfather, objected. Later, at Neetu Singh and Rishi Kapoor's wedding ceremony in London, Raj Kapoor introduced Agha to director and film producer B. R. Chopra, who cast her as the female lead in his blockbuster 1982 film Nikaah, replacing Zeenat Aman.

== Career ==
Her first film was the romance Nikaah (1982), in which she starred as the female lead and also sang several of the film's songs herself. She was nominated for the Filmfare awards that year in both the Best Actress category and the Best Female Playback Singer category. It was for her singing that she won the Filmfare Best Female Playback Award. She is also known for her role in Kasam Paida Karne Wale Ki (1984) opposite Mithun Chakraborty, and for her song "Come Closer" from the same film.

== Personal life ==
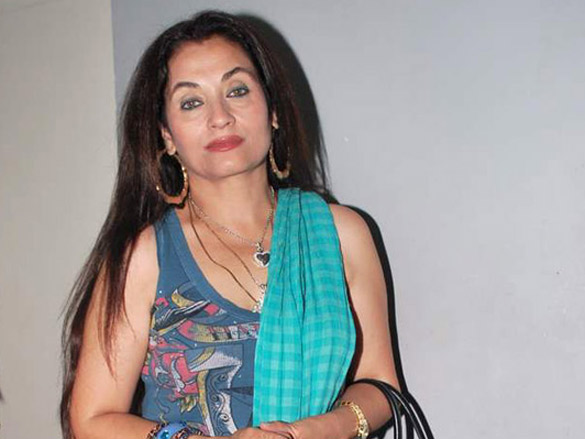
Agha in 2010

Salma Agha was in a relationship in the 1980s with London-based businessman Mahmud Sipra. This relationship lasted many years, during which time Salma made her film debut, but it did not develop into marriage.

She has been married three times. Her first husband was Pakistani actor Javed Sheikh in the 1980s. She was then married to the Pakiatani squash player Rahmat Khan of the Khan squash family (and the father of Natasha Khan through his first marriage) from 1989 to 2010 and they have two children together – Zara "Sasha" Agha Khan and Ali Agha Khan (Liaqat Ali Khan).

In 2011, she married Manzar Shah, a Dubai-based businessman. She lives in Mumbai, where her daughter Zara works in Bollywood films.

In January 2017, she was granted Overseas Citizenship of India status by the Indian government.

== Filmography ==
=== Film ===
==== Indian films ====
Year	Title	Role	Notes
1982	Nikaah	Nilofar	Won—Filmfare Award for Best Female Playback Singer; Nominated—Filmfare Award for Best Actress
1984	Kasam Paida Karne Wale Ki	Leena	Nominated—Filmfare Award for Best Female Playback Singer
1985	Salma	Salma Banarasi	
1985	Oonche Log	Poonam Singh	
1988	Jungle Ki Beti	Bela	
1988	Paanch Fauladi	Julie	
1988	Mahaveera	Don's dancer	
1988	Kanwarlal	Item girl	
1990	Pati Patni Aur Tawaif	Gauri	
1991	Meet Mere Man Ke	Jyoti	
1992	Jethaa		
1996	Gehra Raaz	Vasundhara	
2010	Bachao – Inside Bhoot Hai...		

==== Pakistani films ====
Year	Title	Role	Language	Notes
1984	Bobby		Urdu	
1985	Ham Aur Tum		Urdu	
1986	Ham Ek Hayn		Urdu	
1986	Da Mor Inteqam		Pashto	
1986	Bhabi Dian Choorian	Aamna	Punjabi	
1987	Ek Say Barh Kar Ek		Urdu	
1988	Qatilon Kay Qatil		Urdu	
1988	Choron Ka Badshah		Urdu	
1988	Aag Hi Aag		Urdu	
1988	Daagh		Punjabi	
1988	Bazar-e-Husn		Urdu	
1988	Da Bhabhi Bangri		Pashto	
1988	Gharibon Ka Badshah		Urdu	
1988	Sherni		Punjabi / Urdu	
1989	Taqat Ka Toofan		Urdu	
1989	Phoolan Devi		Punjabi	
1990	Damoor Inteqam		Pashto	
1990	Number One		Punjabi / Urdu	
1991	Aakhri Shikar		Punjabi / Urdu film	
1991	Cobra		Punjabi / Urdu	
1993	Ghunghru-o-Klashankoff		Pashto	
2016	Hijrat	Feriha	Urdu	

== Discography ==
Songs	Film	Co-singer
"Dil Ke Armaan"	Nikaah	Solo
"Dil Ki Yeh Arzoo Thi"	Nikaah	Mahendra Kapoor
"Chehra Chupa Liya Hai"	Nikaah	Asha Bhosle, Mahendra Kapoor
"Faza Bhi Hai Jawaan Jawaan"	Nikaah	Solo
"Zara Zara Tu Pyaar kar"	Maine Jeena Seekh Liya	Salma Agha
"Chala hai Balamwa"	Sheeshay ka Ghar	Salma Agha
"Mukhtaar si baat"	Sheeshay ka Ghar	Salma Agha
"Na Todo piya"	Sheeshay ka Ghar	Salma Agha
"Tarana"	Sheeshay ka Ghar	Salma Agha
"Maa hoon na Suhagan hoon"	Kanoon Meri Mutthi Mein	Salma Agha
"Tu Mera Kya Lage"	Oonche Log	Kishore Kumar
"Shah-E-Madina"	Salma	Solo
"Tarasti Hain Deedar Ko"	Salma	Anwar
"Zindagi Tere Dar Pe"	Salma	Solo
"Kehna Na Tum Yeh Kisise"	Pati Patni Aur Tawaif	Mohammed Aziz
"Mujhe Log Kehte Hain"	Pati Patni Aur Tawaif	Solo
"Teri Mohhabbat Meri Jawani"	Pati Patni Aur Tawaif	Mohammed Aziz
"Mera Naam Salma"	Aap Ke Saath	Solo
"Chumma Chumma"	Pataal Bhairavi	Solo
"Ae Mere Mehboob"	Salma	Shabbir Kumar
"Kaahe Baithe Ho"	Salma	Penaz Masani
"Come Closer"	Kasam Paida Karne Wale Ki	Solo
"Dance Dance"	Kasam Paida Karne Wale Ki	Bappi Lahiri
"Jeena Bhi Kya Hai Jeena"	Kasam Paida Karne Wale Ki	Bappi Lahiri
"Pyar Ek Nasha Hai"	Kanwarlal	Solo
"Pehla Pehla Pyaar Na Bhoole"	Mazdoor	Solo
"Aaina Haseen Hua Hai"	Dunno Y2... Life Is A Moment	Solo
" Meet mere Man ke (Title Track)"	Meet Mere Man ke 1991	Solo
"Chale Aao"	Meet Mere Man ke 1991	Salma Agha & Manhar Udas
"Shama Hoon Main Jalna"	Meet Mere Man ke 1991	Salma Agha (Solo)
"Jahan Aaj Hum Mile Hain"	Bobby 1984 (Urdu)	Salma Agha (Solo)
"Ek Baar Milo Humse"	Bobby (Urdu)	Salma Agha (Solo) & With Ghulam Abbas
"Ghar Nahi Jana"	Gumraah	Salma Agha (Zahrah Khan & Armaan Malik )

== Awards and recognition ==
Year	Award	Category	Result	Title	Ref.
1983	30th Filmfare Awards	Best Female Playback Singer	Won	Nikaah	
1983	30th Filmfare Awards	Best Actress	Nominated	Nikaah	
1985	32nd Filmfare Awards	Best Female Playback Singer	Nominated	Kasam Paida Karne Wale Ki	
1988	Nigar Award	Best Actress	Won	Bazar-e-Husn	
