= Nishatunnisa Mohani =

Indian freedom fighter (1884 – 1937)

Nishatunnisha Mohani
- Born: 1884; Lucknow, India
- Died: 18 April 1937 (aged 52–53)
- Political party: Indian National Congress
- Movement: non-cooperation movement and Khilafat movement
- Spouse: Hasrat Mohani

Begum Nishatunnisha Mohani (1884 – 18 April 1937) was an Indian freedom fighter, journalist and social worker. She was a staunch critic of the British rule and supported the movement, which started by Bal Gangadhar Tilak. Tilak was a supporter of the Non cooperation movement.

== Early life and background ==
Born in Lucknow in 1885, Nishatunnisa received her education at home, following the tradition of that era. She was proficient in Urdu, Arabic, Persian, and English.

== Life and movements ==
Nishatunnisa worked extensively in the non-cooperation movement and Khilafat movement. It was Nishatunnisa who started the first Khadi clothes shop by the name of Aligarh Khilafat Store. With the income earned from this, she supported Mahatma Gandhi's magazine Young India. She vehemently opposed the legal actions taken by the British and persevered in the publication of Hasrat Mohani's newspaper Urdu-e-Mualla.

She condemned and criticised Mahatma Gandhi for not standing up for the resolution for Complete Independence that had been suggested by her husband, Hasrat Mohani.

Later she left Indian National Congress and she continued fighting for the interests of farmers and laborers.

== Personal life ==
She was married to Hasrat Mohani, a tenacious independence warrior and the one who gave the phrase “Inquilab Zindabad”

== Death ==
Nishatunnisa died on 18 April 1937.
