= Hungama Hai Kyon Barpa =

Single by Ghulam Ali

from the album Aap Ka Khadim (Mehdi Hassan) Ghazal Ka Safar/Awaargi
- Released: 1990
- Recorded: 1990
- Genre: Ghazal
- Length: 0:08:26
- Songwriter: Akbar Allahabadi
- Producer: Wazir Ali

"Hungama Hai Kyon Barpa" is a popular ghazal, most prominently sung by Ghulam Ali. It is written by Akbar Allahabadi and is composed in Raag Darbari Kanada. This ghazal was used for the first time in a Pakistani film Aap Ka Khadim, which was directed by Wazir Ali. Its music was composed by Khalil Ahmed and sung by Mehdi Hassan, but the lyrics were credited to Tasleem Fazli, the lyricist for the remainder of the songs in the film. Later, Ghulam Ali covered it with the same basic music composition and made it popular.
