= Kal Chaudhvin Ki Raat Thi =

"Kal Chaudhvin Ki Raat Thi کل چودہویں کی رات تھی"

Song
- Genre: Ghazal
- Songwriter: Ibn-e-Insha

Kal Chaudhvin Ki Raat Thi (کل چودہویں کی رات تھی) is a popular ghazal from the movie Khamoshi. It was originally sung by Jagjit Singh but the versions by Ghulam Ali, Asad Amanat Ali and Abida Parveen are also popular. It is written by Ibn-e-Insha. This song was also sung by Kumar Sanu in the movie Jiyala, which was also a semihit in the 1990s. The song was also sung by Nighat Akbar on PTV (Pakistan Television) in 1970s before the separation of East Pakistan and becoming Bangladesh.
