= Adithya Srinivasan =

Indian singer (born 1992)

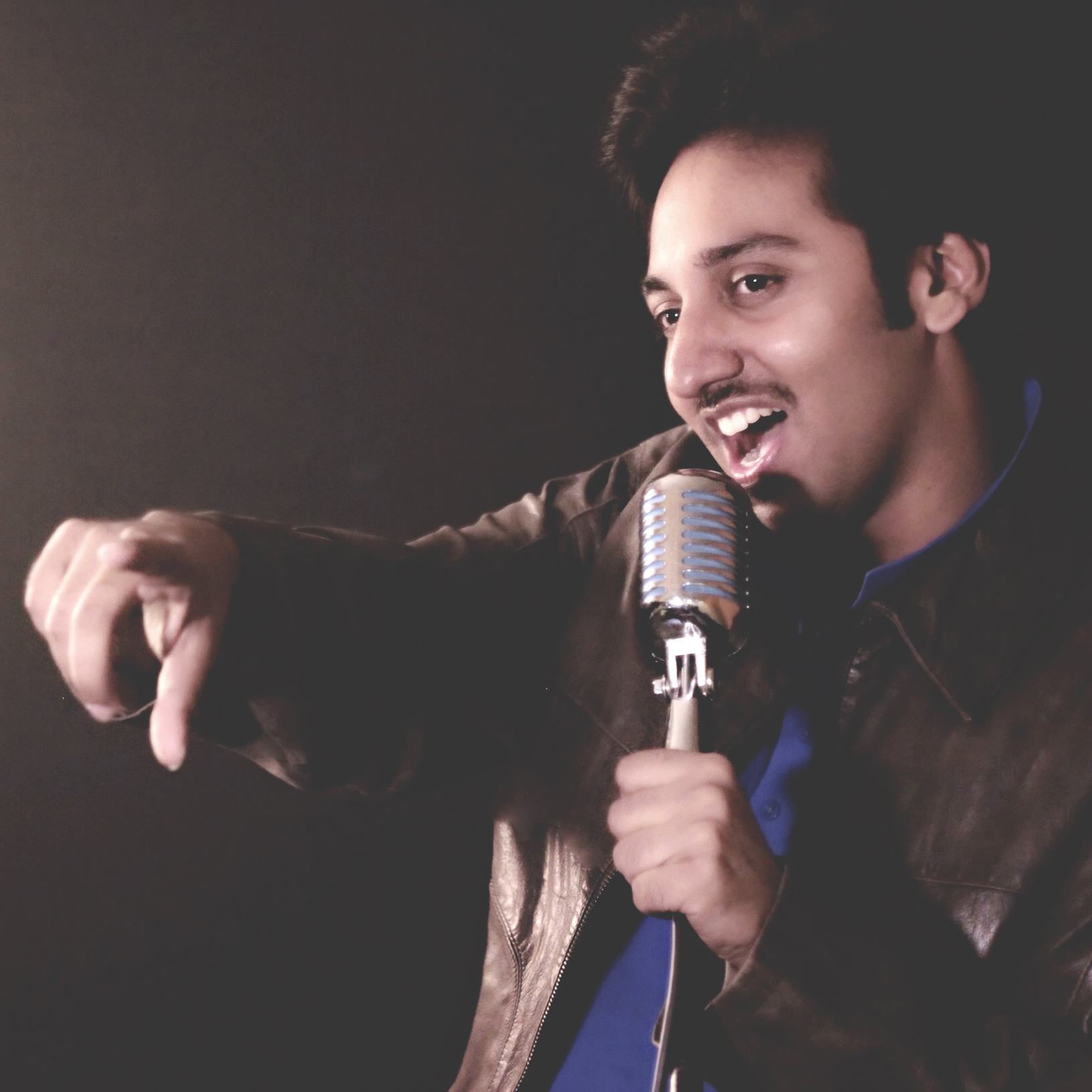

Background information
- Born: 19 June 1992 (age 34)
- Genres: Ghazal, Classical, Pop, World
- Label: Independent
- Website: adithyasrinivasan.com

Adithya Srinivasan is an Indian singer. He is best known for his award winning ghazals, and international singles in classical, pop, and world music genres. His notable performances include sharing stage space with Hariharan and opening for Ghulam Ali.

== Education ==
Adithya studied leadership at Harvard Business School and business analytics at the Singapore Management University in collaboration with The Wharton School.

== Career ==
=== Music career ===
Adithya's tribute to 6 ghazals originally rendered by Mehdi Hassan, Jagjit Singh, Hariharan, Ghulam Ali and Pankaj Udhas won him the Singer of the Year Silver Award from Swar Switzerland.

Adithya's first international single, Gham-e-Duniya, written by the Mughal poet Mirza Ghalib, featuring a Miss Universe finalist, earned a 5-star rating on Apple iTunes, and went viral on YouTube.

In 2014, Adithya featured Grammy nominated pianist Jonathan Wesley and flautist Parth Chandiramani for Tu Hi Dilruba, landing a consideration in the 57th Grammy Awards ballot, and a Silver Award in the Southeast Asian VIMA Music Awards.

Adithya collaborated with Massachusetts based composer Sonaljit and Hollywood screen & stage actress Yanna Fabian for Devanke in 2015, landing a consideration in the 58th Grammy Awards ballot, a nomination in the 3rd Radio City Freedom Awards, and a Judge's Special Award in the Southeast Asian VIMA Music Awards.

In 2017, Adithya released Aarzu, an all acoustic ghazal written by Daagh Dehlvi. The single featured musicians from across India, and was mastered by The Beatles’ Grammy winning engineer at the Abbey Road Studios, United Kingdom.

Adithya was featured on Grammy winning composer Laura Sullivan's single 900 Voices.

In 2020, Adithya's music also served as the main theme song in Saad Khan's film Loneliness, based on an account of the prevalent national social distancing during the COVID-19 pandemic.

=== Corporate career ===
Adithya has worked in strategy and business development across Singapore and The United Arab Emirates.

== Discography ==
- 2011: Ghazal Ka Mausam – A Tribute to the Legends
- 2012: Kaash Aisa Koi Manzur Hota
- 2013: Gham e Duniya
- 2014: Tu Hi Dilruba
- 2015: Devanke
- 2016: Signature
- 2017: Aarzu
- 2021: Ghazal Ke Ishaare (Unreleased)
- 2023: Aayiram (Unreleased)
- 2024: Sri Hari Stotram
- 2025: Sri Hanuman Chalisa
- 2026: Spiritual Sounds of The Gayatri Mantra

== Awards and nominations ==
Organisation	Year	Category	Work	Result	Ref.
Swar Switzerland Award	2014	Singer of the Year	Ghazal Ka Mausam – A Tribute to the Legends	Silver Award	
57th Grammy Award	2014	Best Pop Solo Performance	Tu Hi Dilruba	First round Ballot	
58th Grammy Award	2015	Record of The Year	Devanke	First round Ballot	
3rd Radio City Award	2016	Best Indie Collaboration of The Year	Devanke	Nominated	
VIMA Southeast Asia Music Award	2016	Best Indian Song	Devanke	Judge's Special Award	
VIMA Southeast Asia Music Award	2016	Best Indian Song	Tu Hi Dilruba	Judge's Special Award	
VIMA Southeast Asia Music Award	2017	Best Pop Song	Tu Hi Dilruba	Silver Award	
