= Chupki =

- Village
- Location in Punjab, India Chupki (India)
- Coordinates: 30.7950226°N 75.834074°E
- Country: India
- State: Punjab
- District: Ludhiana

Government
  - Type: Panchayati raj (India)
  - Body: Gram panchayat

Languages
  - Official: Punjabi
  - Other spoken: Hindi
- Time zone: UTC+5:30 (IST)
- Telephone code: 0161
- ISO 3166 code: IN-PB
- Vehicle registration: PB-10
- Website: ludhiana.nic.in

Chupki is a village located in the Ludhiana East tehsil, of Ludhiana district, Punjab, India.

== Administration ==
The village is administered by a Sarpanch Rajveer Singh. Baldev Singh Grewal. GREWAL HOUSE ਮਿੱਲਵਾਲੇ is an elected representative of the village as per the constitution of India and Panchayati raj system (India).

Particulars	Total	Male	Female
Total No. of Houses	161		
Population	967	503	464
