= Nikaah (film) =

1982 film

- Directed by: B. R. Chopra
- Written by: Dr. Achla Nagar.
- Produced by: B. R. Chopra
- Starring: Raj Babbar; Deepak Parashar; Salma Agha
- Narrated by: Tanuja
- Cinematography: Dharam Chopra
- Edited by: S. B. Mane
- Music by: Ravi
- Distributed by: B. R. Films
- Release date: 24 September 1982
- Running time: 144 minutes
- Country: India
- Language: Hindi

Nikaah (lit. marriage) is a 1982 Indian Hindi-language romantic drama film produced and directed by B. R. Chopra.

The film stars Raj Babbar, Deepak Parashar and Salma Agha in her Hindi film debut. The film also had Asrani and Iftekhar in supporting roles. The film's music was composed by Ravi and was a huge hit. The original name of the film was Talaq Talaq Talaq, but was renamed Nikaah on the insistence of Islamic clerics.

The film won Filmfare Award for Best Dialogue and Filmfare Award for Best Female Playback Singer for 1982. It was the sixth highest grossing Bollywood film of 1982.

== Plot ==
Haider and Nilofar are students in the Osmania University. Haider, an aspiring poet, falls in love with Nilofar without knowing she is already engaged to Wasim, who is a Nawab. Nilofar and Wasim eventually marry while Haider becomes a successful poet and editor of a magazine.

After marriage, Nilofar learns that Wasim is a workaholic and also has the tendency of picking up fights on petty issues. During their honeymoon, Wasim gets a new business contract and spends most of his time at work. Nilofar, who was expecting a blissful married life is disappointed and feels neglected and lonely. Wasim repeatedly fails to keep his promises to Nilofar and keeps her in waiting on numerous occasions, often leaving her in tears. On the occasion of their first wedding anniversary, Wasim and Nilofar arrange a party for which Wasim fails to turn up. Nilofar can't face the guests and retires to her bedroom. The guests feel insulted by the absence of the hosts and leave the party. This leads to a heated argument between the couple and in a moment of rage Wasim divorces Nilofar by saying Talaq three times.

Nilofar, now a divorcee is offered a job by Haider in his magazine. During this period, she realizes Haider is still in love with her. Wasim who has divorced her in a moment of anger, wants to reconcile and marry her again. He approaches the Imam and asks his advice on the matter. The Imam tells him the complexity of the Sharia law of Nikah halala for remarrying a woman after divorcing her. This requires her to marry someone else, consummate the union and get a divorce later. Only then will Wasim be able to remarry Nilofar.

During this time Haider expresses his love towards Nilofar and his desire to marry her. They marry with the consent of their parents. Wasim sends a letter to Nilofar asking her to divorce Haider and marry him. Haider reads this letter and thinks that Nilofar and Wasim are still in love. He decides to offer her a divorce, so that she can marry Wasim. He brings Wasim to her and offers his consent to divorce her through Talaq. But Nilofar turns it down and questions both of them on their treating of her like a property rather than as a woman. She says she wants to continue her life with Haider. Wasim gives them his blessing and leaves.

== Cast ==
- Raj Babbar as Afaque Haider
- Deepak Parashar as Wasim Ahmed
- Salma Agha as Nilofar Haider
- Asrani as Saif
- Iftekhar as Jumman Chacha
- Heena Kausar as Wasim's sister
- Urmilla Bhatt as Mrs. Ahmed
- Yunus Parvez as Qazi Sahab (Guest appearance)
- Archana Puran Singh (Guest appearance)
- Ghulam Ali (Guest appearance)
- Tanuja as Narrator

== Production ==
=== Filming ===
Major part of Nikaah was filmed in multiple locations in Hyderabad - Osmania University, Eat Street or Necklace Road (Hussain Sagar), Government Nizamia Tibbi College located near Charminar, Shahi Masjid in Public Gardens and Ravindra Bharathi auditorium. The honeymoon segment and the songs were filmed in Taj Lands End and around.

== Music ==
All lyrics are written by Hasan Kamal except 'Chupke Chupke Raat Din..' written by Hasrat Mohani; all music is composed by Ravi

Songs
No.	Title	Playback	Length
1.	"Beete Hue Lamhon Ki Kasak Sath Toh Hogi -"	Mahendra Kapoor	5:57
2.	"Chehra Chhupa Liya Hai Kisine Hijab Me"	Mahendra Kapoor, Salma Agha, Asha Bhosle	6:32
3.	"Chupke Chupke Raat Din"	Ghulam Ali	7:48
4.	"Dil Ke Armaan Aansuon Me Bah Gaye"	Salma Agha	4:23
5.	"Dil Ki Ye Aarzoo Thi Koi Dilruba Mile"	Mahendra Kapoor, Salma Agha	5:42
6.	"Faza Bhi Hai Jawaan Jawaan" (1)	Salma Agha	4:02
7.	"Faza Bhi Hai Jawaan Jawaan" (2)	Salma Agha	5:07
Total length:			39:31

== Awards and nominations ==
Year	Nominee / work	Award	Result
1982	Salma Agha (for "Dil Ke Armaan")	Best Female Playback Singer	Won
1982	Achla Nagar	Best Dialogue	Won
1982	B. R. Chopra	Best Film	Nominated
1982	B. R. Chopra	Best Director	Nominated
1982	Salma Agha	Best Actress	Nominated
1982	Dr. Achla Nagar	Best Story	Nominated
1982	Ravi	Best Music Director	Nominated
1982	Hassan Kamaal (for "Dil Ke Armaan")	Best Lyricist	Nominated
1982	Hassan Kamaal (for "Dil Ki Ke Yeh Arzoo")	Best Lyricist	Nominated
1982	Salma Agha (for "Faza Bhi Hai Jawan")	Best Female Playback Singer	Nominated
1982	Salma Agha (for "Dil Ki Yeh Arzoo Thi")	Best Female Playback Singer	Nominated
