= Chupke Chupke Raat Din =

Single by Ghulam Ali
- Released: 1976
- Genre: Ghazal
- Length: 7:59
- Songwriter: Maulana Hasrat Mohani

Chupke Chupke Raat Din (Urdu: چپکے چپکے رات دن, romanized: Cupkē-Cupkē Rāt-Din, lit. 'quietly-quietly night & day') is a popular ghazal written by Maulana Hasrat Mohani. The music composition is based on Raga Kafi. It is a classical Urdu poem that represents the culture of the Mughal Dynasty. The ghazal became famous after it was sung by Ghulam Ali. A shorter version of the ghazal is included among the songs in the film Nikaah.

The ghazal was also used as background music in Aditya Dhar's 2025 spy action thriller film Dhurandhar.

== Original lyrics ==
چپکے چپکے رات دن آنسو بہانا یاد ہے

ہم کو اب تک عاشقی کا وہ زمانہ یاد ہے

با ہزاراں اضطراب و صد ہزاراں اشتیاق

تجھ سے وہ پہلے پہل دل کا لگانا یاد ہے

بار بار اُٹھنا اسی جانب نگاہ ِ شوق کا

اور ترا غرفے سے وُہ آنکھیں لڑانا یاد ہے

تجھ سے کچھ ملتے ہی وہ بے باک ہو جانا مرا

اور ترا دانتوں میں وہ انگلی دبانا یاد ہے

کھینچ لینا وہ مرا پردے کا کونا دفعتاً

اور دوپٹے سے ترا وہ منہ چھپانا یاد ہے

جان کرسونا تجھے وہ قصد ِ پا بوسی مرا

اور ترا ٹھکرا کے سر، وہ مسکرانا یاد ہے

تجھ کو جب تنہا کبھی پانا تو ازراہِ لحاظ

حال ِ دل باتوں ہی باتوں میں جتانا یاد ہے

جب سوا میرے تمہارا کوئی دیوانہ نہ تھا

سچ کہو کچھ تم کو بھی وہ کارخانا یاد ہے

غیر کی نظروں سے بچ کر سب کی مرضی کے خلاف

وہ ترا چوری چھپے راتوں کو آنا یاد ہے

آ گیا گر وصل کی شب بھی کہیں ذکر ِ فراق

وہ ترا رو رو کے مجھ کو بھی رُلانا یاد ہے

دوپہر کی دھوپ میں میرے بُلانے کے لیے

وہ ترا کوٹھے پہ ننگے پاؤں آنا یاد ہے

آج تک نظروں میں ہے وہ صحبتِ راز و نیاز

اپنا جانا یاد ہے،تیرا بلانا یاد ہے

میٹھی میٹھی چھیڑ کر باتیں نرالی پیار کی

ذکر دشمن کا وہ باتوں میں اڑانا یاد ہے

دیکھنا مجھ کو جو برگشتہ تو سو سو ناز سے

جب منا لینا تو پھر خود روٹھ جانا یاد ہے

چوری چوری ہم سے تم آ کر ملے تھے جس جگہ

مدتیں گزریں،پر اب تک وہ ٹھکانہ یاد ہے

شوق میں مہندی کے وہ بے دست و پا ہونا ترا

اور مِرا وہ چھیڑنا، گُدگدانا یاد ہے

با وجودِ ادعائے اتّقا حسرت مجھے

آج تک عہدِ ہوس کا وہ فسانا یاد ہے

== Popularity ==
This ghazal has been sung by many notable singers of Pakistan such as Ghulam Ali, who popularized it by singing it in the 1982 film Nikaah. Indian singers Asha Bhosle and Hans Raj Hans, and Ghazal singer Jagjit Singh, have also rendered their voices to this ghazal.
