= Chaman Ganj, Kanpur =

Chaman Ganj
- Neighbourhood
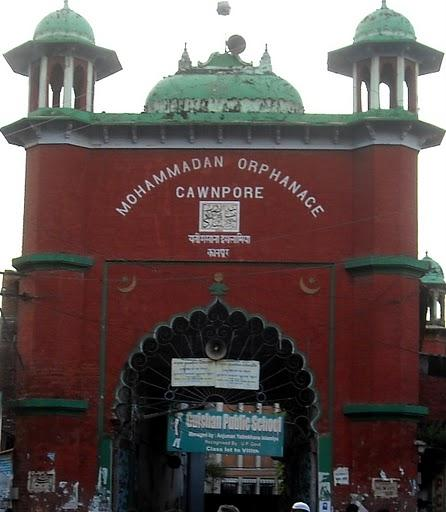
- Cawnpore Orphanage, built during the British Raj

- Location in Uttar Pradesh, India
- Coordinates: 26°28′N 80°20′E
- Country: India
- State: Uttar Pradesh
- District: Kanpur Nagar

Government
  - Body: Kanpur Municipal Corporation

Languages
  - Official: Hindi, Urdu, English & Awadhi
- Time zone: UTC+5:30 (IST)
- PIN: 208 001
- Vehicle registration: UP-78
- Nearest city: Kanpur
- Literacy: 85%
- Lok Sabha Constituency: Kanpur Nagar
- Vidhan Sabha Constituency: Sisamau, Arya Nagar
- Civic agency: 2

Chaman ganj is a residential area situated in the heart of Kanpur in the Indian state of Uttar Pradesh.

== Demography ==
Religions in Chaman Ganj
Religion	Percent
Muslims	94%
Hindus	3.5%
Jains	0.2%
Others†	2.2%
Distribution of religions †Includes Sikhs (0.2%), Buddhists (<0.2%).
