= Kanpur Electricity Supply Company =

Energy company in Uttar Pradesh, India

Kanpur Electricity Supply Company Limited
- Type: State-owned company
- Industry: Electric power distribution
- Founded: 14 January 2000
- Headquarters: Kanpur, Uttar Pradesh, India
- Area served: Kanpur Municipal Corporation area
- Key people: Saumya Aggarwal (Managing Director)
- Services: Electricity distribution and bulk power supply
- Owner: Government of Uttar Pradesh
- Parent: Uttar Pradesh Power Corporation Limited

The Kanpur Electricity Supply Company Ltd. (KESCo) is a Government of Uttar Pradesh undertaking, part of Uttar Pradesh Power Corporation Limited, it was formed on 14 January 2000, and supplies power to the entire area under the Kanpur Municipal Corporation.

KESCo is responsible for distribution and bulk supply of power in Kanpur and provides power to over 427,158 consumers, consisting of approximately 350,000 domestic, 73,000 commercial, and 8,000 others including small, medium, large, and heavy power connections. Maintaining all the consumers through a network based on 61 electrical substations of 33/6.6 kV level, 333 feeders of 11 kV level and more than 3,000 distribution transformers of different levels. Currently Saumya Aggarwal is the managing director at KESCo.
