= Hasrat Mohani =

Indian freedom fighter and poet of the Urdu language

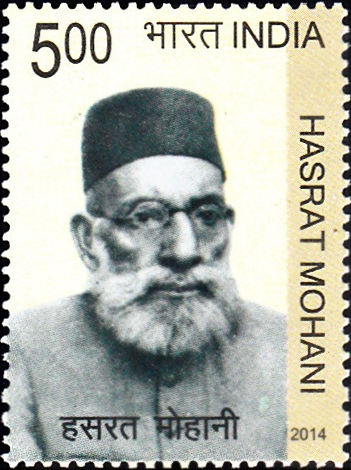
- Mohani on a 2014 stamp of India
- Born: Syed Fazl-ul-Hasan; 1 January 1875; Mohan, North-Western Provinces, British India (Present-day Uttar Pradesh, India)
- Died: 13 May 1951 (aged 76); Lucknow, Uttar Pradesh, India
- Other name: Hasrat Mohani (Pen Name)
- Education: Muhammadan Anglo-Oriental College (BA) in 1903,
- Occupations: Poet, Indian independence activist, politician, philosopher
- Known for: ...
- Political party: Indian National Congress, Communist Party of India
- Movement: Indian independence movement
- Spouse: Nishatunnisa Mohani

Syed Fazl-ul-Hasan (1 January 1875 – 13 May 1951), known by his pen-name Hasrat Mohani, was an Indian independence activist and a poet in Urdu. He is regarded as the first person to demand complete independence for India in 1921 at the Ahmedabad Session of Congress. Maghfoor Ahmad Ajazi supported the complete independence motion demanded by Hasrat Mohani.

== Biography ==
He was born in 1875 [though the year of his birth is variously mentioned as 1880 and 1881 in many books] as Syed Fazl-ul-Hasan at Mohan, a town in the Unnao district of United Provinces in British India.

Hasrat was his pen name (takhallus) that he used in his Urdu poetry whereas his last name 'Mohani' refers to Mohan, his birthplace.

His ancestors migrated from Nishapur, in Iran.

Hasrat Mohani championed the freedom struggle.

=== Education ===
He received his primary education at Kanpur Vernacular Middle School in Fatehpur Haswah, a town near Kanpur. He achieved a top position in Grade 8 in Uttar Pradesh and then came first in mathematics in the Matric (Grade 10) exam. He received two scholarships, one from the government and the other from Muhammadan Anglo-Oriental College. He completed his BA in 1903 at Muhammadan Anglo-Oriental College which later became Aligarh Muslim University but before that he had been expelled from the college on three occasions for his criticism of the British government. Some of his colleagues at Aligarh was Mohammad Ali Jouhar and Shaukat Ali. His teachers in poetry were Tasleem Lucknawi and Naseem Dehlvi. To honor him, Aligarh Muslim University has a hostel named after him.

=== Academic ===
A few of his books are Kulliyat-e-Hasrat Mohani (Collection of Hasrat Mohani's poetry), Sharh-e-Kalam-e-Ghalib (Explanation of Ghalib's poetry), Nukaat-e-Sukhan ( Important aspects of poetry), Mushahidaat-e-Zindaan (Observations in Prison), etc. A very popular ghazal Chupke Chupke Raat Din sung by Ghulam Ali and 'Ghazal King' Jagjit Singh was penned by him. He was also featured in the film Nikaah (1982). The famous slogan of Indian freedom fighters Inquilab Zindabad was coined by Mohani in 1921.

He also wrote verses expressing deep love for Krishna, and often went to Mathura to celebrate Krishna Janmashtami.

=== Political ===
Mohani was a member of the Indian National Congress for many years and also joined the All India Muslim League, serving as its president in 1919. He opposed the partition of India. After the declaration of the Partition Plan on 3 June 1947, Mohani resigned as a member of the All India Muslim League and when the division of the country occurred, he chose to live in independent India. He became a member of the Constituent Assembly of India which drafted the Indian Constitution. To represent the remaining Indian Muslims on different platforms, Hasrat Mohani chose to live in India rather than migrate to Pakistan.

He never accepted Government allowances or stayed at official residences. Instead, he stayed in mosques and used to go to the Parliament in a shared Tonga. He was a religious practicing Muslim and led a simple life. Maulana had gone for Hajj (pilgrimage to Mecca, Saudi Arabia) several times. He used to travel in third-class railroad cars. When asked why he traveled third class, he quipped because there is no fourth class.

== Struggle for Indian independence ==
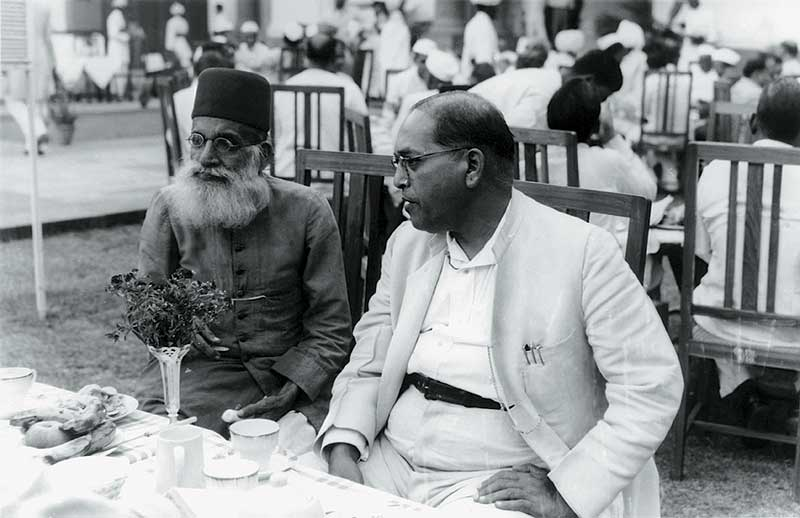
B. R. Ambedkar and Mohani (left) at Vallabhbhai Patel's reception

Mohani participated in the struggle for Indian Independence (end of British Raj); and was jailed in 1903 for many years by British authorities. At that time political prisoners were treated like common criminals and forced to do manual labor.

In 1904, he joined the Indian National Congress Party. He was the first person in Indian History who demanded 'Complete Independence' (Azadi-e-Kaamil) in the 1921 annual session of the Indian National Congress, in Ahmedabad, along with Swami Kumaranand. In December 1929, his campaign for 'complete independence' resulted in the shape of Indian National Congress session in Lahore.

Mohani opposed the partition of India. After complete independence from the British rule, Maulana Hasrat Mohani wanted a confederal set-up on the pattern of Union of Soviet Socialist Republic (USSR). He wanted to see a confederal constitution in India after freedom from the British. His proposal had six federations: 1. East Pakistan; 2. West Pakistan; 3. Central India; 4. South-eastern India; 5. South-western India; and 6. Hyderabad Deccan.

=== Urdu-e-Mualla ===
He was also imprisoned for promoting anti-colonial British ideas, especially for publishing an article against British policies (to protect imperial trade routes, control Egyptian finances, safeguard European financial investments, suppress nationalists, and maintain colonial power) in Egypt, in his magazine 'Urdu-e-Mualla'. Afterward, unlike some Urdu poets like Josh Malihabadi and many Muslim leaders, he chose to live in India rather than move to Pakistan after independence (1947) to represent Indian Muslims on various platforms. In recognition for his efforts, he was made a member of the constituent assembly, which drafted the Indian constitution. But unlike other members, he never signed it.

=== Communist movement ===
He was among the founders of the Communist Party of India.

He was deeply influenced by the Russian Revolution. His house in Kanpur was the center of preparations for the 1925 Kanpur Communist Conference, the first all-India Communist conference that was held in December 1925. K.N. Joglekar wrote in his reminiscences that he and the Bombay group came to know through VH Joshi, going to meet S. A. Dange in Kanpur jail, that Satya Bhakta, Hasrat Mohani and others were taking initiative to convene a communist conference in December 1925. The Bombay group extended full support.

He was elected chairman of the Reception Committee (RC) of the conference. Hasrat Mohani was included in the Central Executive Committee elected at the conference. He was again included in CEC in the 1927 extended meeting.

He later attended the foundation conference of Progressive Writers’ Association (PWA) in Lucknow in 1936.

== Death and legacy ==
Maulana Hasrat Mohani died on May 13, 1951, in Lucknow, India.

Hasrat Mohani Memorial Society was founded by Maulana Nusrat Mohani in 1951. In Karachi, Sindh, Pakistan, the Hasrat Mohani Memorial Library and Hall was established by the Hasrat Mohani Memorial Library and Hall Trust. Every year, on his death anniversary, a memorial meeting is conducted by this Trust as well as many other organizations in India and Pakistan. Also Hasrat Mohani Colony, at Korangi Town in Karachi, Sindh, Pakistan, was named after Maulana Hasrat Mohani. A famous road is named after him in the financial hub of Karachi. Hyderabad, Sindh has one library with name of Hasrat Mohani near to Haider Chowk.

There is a Street Named Maulana Hasrat Mohani in Kadar Palace, Mumbra, Dist: Thane, Maharashtra.

Maulana Hasrat Mohani Hospital is situated in Chamanganj, Kanpur. There is also a road named Maulana Hasrat Mohani Street in Kanpur. Maulana Hasrat Mohani Gallery is situated at Bithoor Museum.

A hostel in Aligarh Muslim University is also named after him.

Department of Post released a commemorative postage stamp on Maulana Hasrat Mohani on 25 February 2014 to honour his contribution in freedom struggle.

== Publications ==
- Urdu-e-Moalla (magazine) (launched in July 1903)
- Kulliyat-e-Hasrat Mohani (Collection of Hasrat Mohani's poetry) (Published in 1928 and 1943)
- Sharh-e-Kalam-e-Ghalib (Explanation of Ghalib's poetry)
- Nukaat-e-Sukhan (Important aspects of poetry)
- Tazkira-tul-Shuara (Essays on the Poets)
- Mushahidaat-e-Zindaan (Observations in the Prison)

== See also ==
- Mawlānā
