= Ghulam Ali (singer) =

Pakistani singer (born 1940)

Ustad Ghulam Ali Khan غلام علی خان
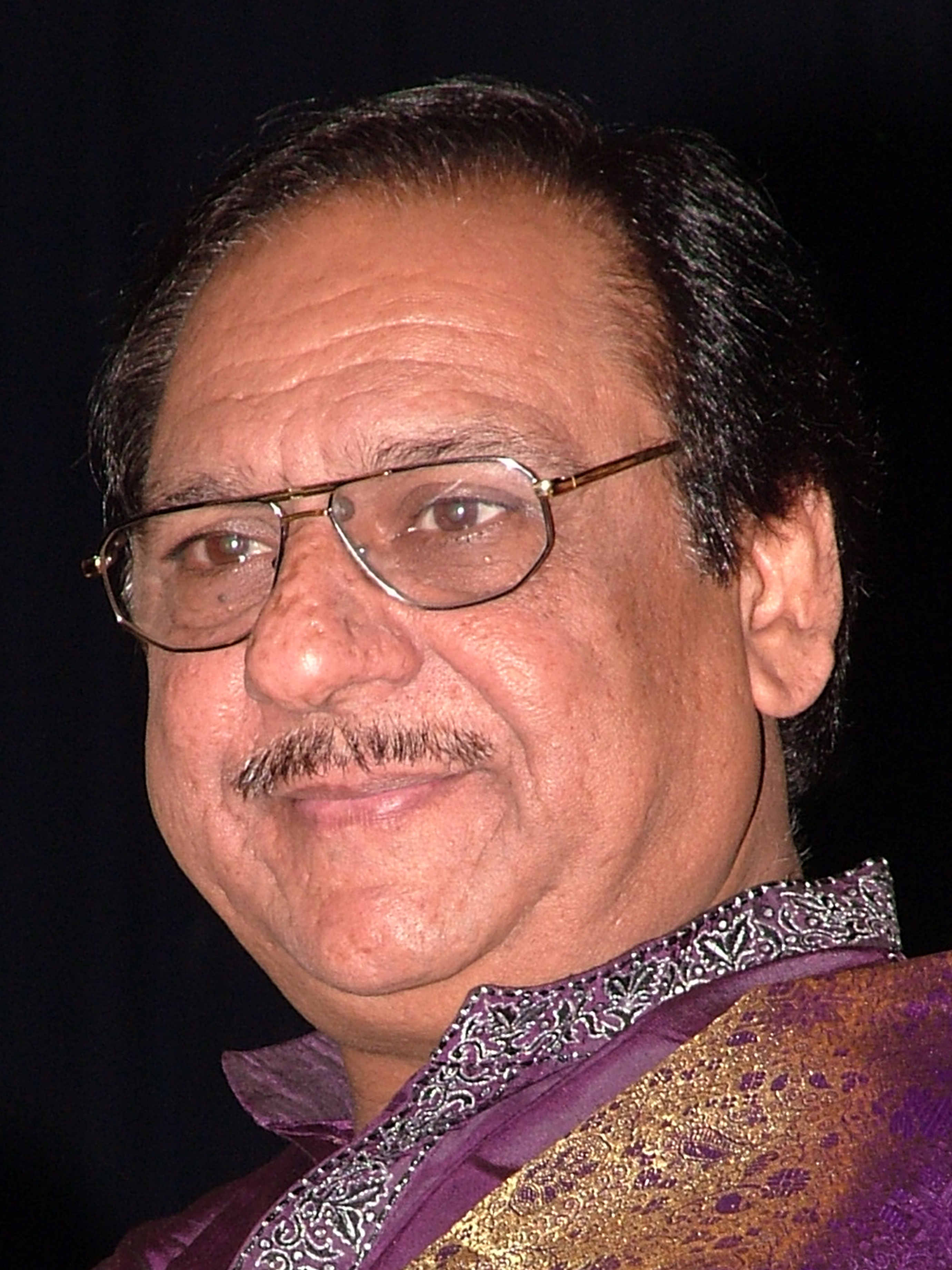
- Ghulam Ali in Chennai

Background information
- Born: 5 December 1940 (age 85); Galotian Khurd, Daska, Punjab, British Raj (now in Sialkot, Pakistan)
- Genres: Hindustani classical music; Ghazal; Playback singing
- Instruments: Vocals; Harmonium; Tabla
- Years active: 1960– present
- Labels: Radio Pakistan, PTV

Ustad Ghulam Ali (Punjabi: غُلام علی; born 5 December 1940) is a Pakistani ghazal singer of the Patiala Gharana. He is regarded as one of the leading ghazal singers of his era who has also been a prominent playback singer in Bollywood. He is a disciple of Bade Ghulam Ali Khan. Ali was also trained by Bade Ghulam Ali's younger brothers, Barkat Ali Khan and Mubarak Ali Khan.

His style and variations in singing ghazals are unique, as he blends Hindustani classical music with ghazals, unlike any other ghazal singer. He is highly popular in Pakistan, India, Afghanistan, Nepal, Bangladesh, as well as among South Asian diaspora in the US, the UK and the Middle Eastern countries. Many of his hit ghazals have been used in Bollywood movies. His famous ghazals are "Chupke Chupke Raat Din", "Kal Chaudhvin Ki Raat Thi", "Hungama Hai Kyon Barpa", "Chamakte Chand Ko", "Kiya Hai Pyar Jise", "May Nazar Se Pee Raha Hoon", "Mastana Peeye", "Ye Dil Ye Pagal Dil", "Apni Dhun Mein Rehta Hoon", and a ghazal by Nasir Kazmi, "Ham Ko Kiske Gham Ne Maara". His album Hasratein was nominated in the Best Ghazal Album category at the Star GIMA Awards 2014.

== Early life ==
Ghulam Ali was born in 1941 in the Sialkot district of present-day Pakistan and was a child during the Partition of India, an event he recalls only faintly. He was introduced to music at an early age, coming from a musical family; his father was a musician, being a vocalist who could play the sarangi, and recognized his talent when one of his teachers noticed him humming a song at school and encouraged him to sing. At the age of 8, Ghulam Ali began formal training under his father, who assigned him a raaga to practise intensively on the harmonium, laying the foundation for his musical discipline. Though his grandmother initially objected to the rigorous training, his father believed early childhood was essential for building a strong musical base. He was named after the classical vocalist Ustad Bade Ghulam Ali Khan, whom his father greatly admired, and later had the opportunity to train under the legendary musician. His father aspired for him to become a ghazal singer, and Ghulam Ali began practising seriously from the age of 9.

Ghulam Ali encountered Ustad Bade Ghulam Ali Khan, for the first time, when he was in his early teens. Ustad Bade Ghulam Ali Khan had toured Kabul, Afghanistan and, on the way back to India, Ghulam Ali's father requested the Ustad to take his son as a disciple. But Khan insisted that since he was hardly in town, regular training wouldn't be possible. But after repeated requests from Ghulam Ali's father, Ustad Bade Ghulam Ali Khan asked the young Ghulam Ali to sing something. It wasn't easy to have the courage to sing before him. He mustered the courage to sing the thumri Saiyyan Bolo Tanik Mose Rahiyo Na Jaye. After he finished, Ustad hugged him and made him his disciple. Apart from the harmonium, he would also learn to play the tabla.

== Personal life ==
He was married to Afsana Ali, with whom he has a daughter, Manjari Ghulam Ali. His sons Aamir Ghulam Ali and Nazar Ali Abbas are also musicians.

== Career ==
=== Pakistan ===
A strong student academically, Ghulam Ali’s musical talent was soon recognized beyond his household. While practising on a terrace, he was noticed by a representative from Radio Pakistan, leading to an invitation to perform. At the age of 14, he began singing for a children’s programme on Radio Pakistan and within six months advanced to performing at the highest level, marking the beginning of his professional musical career.

Along with singing ghazals, Ghulam Ali composed music for his ghazals. His compositions are raga-based and sometimes include a scientific mixture of ragas. He is known for blending gharana-gaaiaki into ghazal and this gives his singing the capability to touch people's hearts. He sings Punjabi songs too. Many of his Punjabi songs have been popular and have been part of Punjab's own cultural diaspora.

On being questioned about Pakistani pop groups, Ghulam Ali replied, "Frankly, I am really bewildered at their style of singing. How can you sing a song by running and jumping around the stage? The stage is meant for performing not for acrobatics."

=== India ===
Though from Pakistan, Ghulam Ali remains as popular in India as in Pakistan. He first came to India in 1980. Asha Bhosle has done joint music albums with him, beginning with Meeraj-E-Ghazal in 1984. He was introduced to Bombay cinema with an Urdu film song Chupke Chupke Raat Din written by the poet Hasrat Mohani in B R Chopra's film, Nikaah (1982). Other popular ghazals include Hungama Hai Kyun Barpa and Awaargi. He tends to select the ghazals of famous poets.

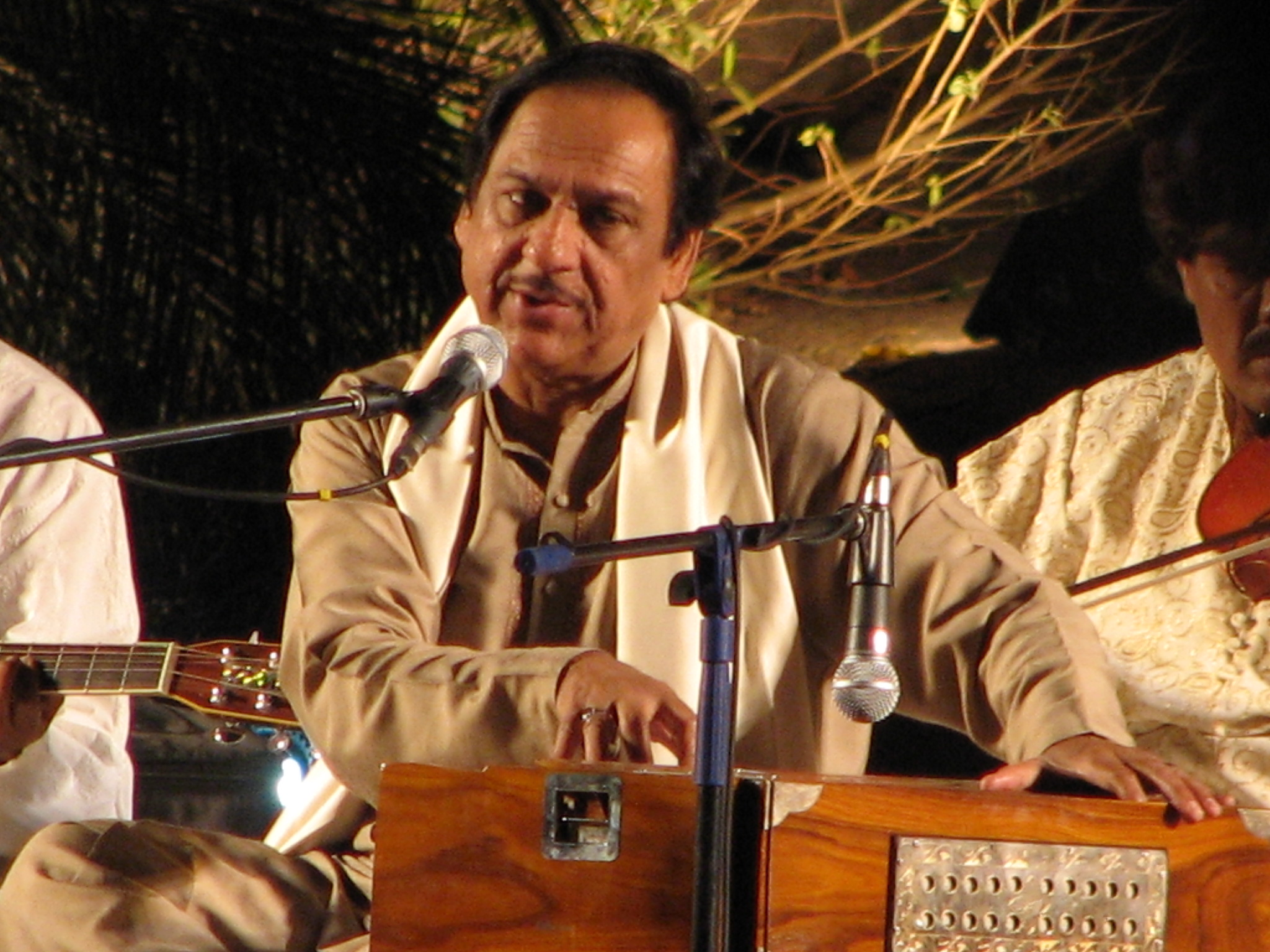
Ghulam Ali in Hyderabad, 2007

One of his memorable concerts was at the Taj Mahal. On being asked about the future of ghazal singers, he said he enjoyed popular ghazal singer Adithya Srinivasan's ghazals, who performed the opening act at his concert in 2012 at Bangalore.

Recently, in February 2013, the maestro became the first person to receive the Bade Ghulam Ali Khan award. Commenting on this, he said," I am indebted to the Indian government for giving me this award. For me, it is the greatest award I have received because it is named after my guru." He also received the first Swaralaya Global Legend Award (2016) at Trivandrum, Kerala, India.

=== Nepal ===
Ghulam Ali has also sung some Nepali ghazals which include Kina Kina Timro Tasbir, Gajalu Ti Thula Thula Aankha, Lolayeka Ti Thula and Ke Chha Ra Diun, which were written by King Mahendra of Nepal and composed by Deepak Jangam. These songs were compiled in an album entitled Narayan Gopal, Ghulam Ali Ra Ma, and are popular among Nepali music lovers to this day.

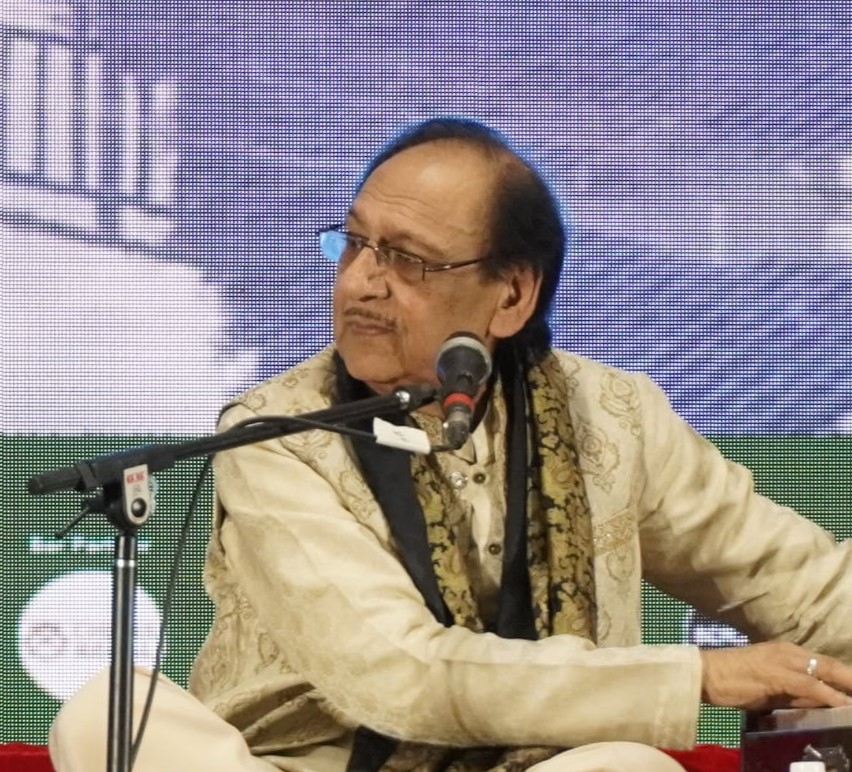
Ghulam Ali in Lalitpur, Nepal, 2025

Furthermore, Ghulam Ali was the singer of choice for His late Majesty the King of Nepal Mahendra Bir Bikram Shah Dev. Ghulam Ali sang a number of popular songs written by King Mahendra.

== Musical style ==
Ghulam Ali is known for composing the majority (he estimates at up to 95%) of the ghazals he performs, stating that most of his repertoire consists of his own compositions, while remaining open to singing works by other composers if he finds them musically strong. Over time, he has increasingly performed self-composed material, which has become a defining feature of his musical output.

His ghazal singing is firmly grounded in the Hindustani classical tradition, drawing extensively from classical raagas while adapting them to the lyrical and emotive structure of the ghazal. He has emphasized that ghazal singing requires rigorous training, particularly in precise pronunciation of Urdu poetry and accurate melodic execution, describing the form as technically demanding and time-intensive to master.

== Controversies ==
=== Performances in India ===
In 2015, due to protest by Shiv Sena at Mumbai, his concert was cancelled. After this, he received invitations from Delhi Chief Minister Arvind Kejriwal, West Bengal Chief Minister Mamata Banerjee and Uttar Pradesh Chief Minister Akhilesh Yadav. After this cancellation, he performed in Lucknow, New Delhi, Thiruvananthapuram, and Kozhikode, India.

In a news item reported in 2015, Ghulam Ali has said that he won't perform in India until situation is right for music. He, however, assured that he will visit India when ‘the atmosphere is right.’ He said that he does not want to be used for political mileage.

== Notable ghazals/songs ==
Title	Poet / Lyricist	Raga	Year	Album / Collection	Film	Notes
Aah ko chahiye ik umr asar hone tak	Mirza Ghalib	—	c. 1975	Classical Ghazals	Non-film	
Ae husn-e-beparwah tujhe shola kahoon ya shabnam	Bashir Badr	—	c. 1980	Ghazals Vol. 3	Non-film	
Aa gayi yaad shaam dhalte hi	Munir Niazi	—	c. 1979	Ghazals Vol. 2	Non-film	
Apni dhun mein rehta hoon	Nasir Kazmi	—	c. 1976	Ghazals Vol. 1	Non-film	
Apni tasveer ko aankhon se	Shahzad Ahmad	—	c. 1977	Ghazals Vol. 1	Non-film	
Arz-e-gham se bhi faida to nahin	Raees Warsi	—	c. 1982	Ghazals Vol. 4	Non-film	
Awaargi	Mohsin Naqvi	Bhairavi (light)	1988	Awaargi	Non-film	Title ghazal
Baharon ko chaman yaad aa gaya	—	—	c. 1981	Ghazals Vol. 3	Non-film	
Barsan lagi sawan bundiya	Traditional	—	c. 1984	Folk & Ghazals	Non-film	Folk-based
Bata do tum humein bedaad karna	Riaz Khairabadi	—	c. 1978	Classical Ghazals	Non-film	
Bechain bahut phirna	Munir Niazi	—	c. 1979	Ghazals Vol. 2	Non-film	
Chamakte chand ko toota hua taara bana dala	Anand Bakshi	—	1982	Awargi (OST)	Awargi	Film song
Chhup chhupa ke piyo	—	—	c. 1977	Ghazals Vol. 1	Non-film	
Chupke Chupke Raat Din	Hasrat Mohani	Kafi (light)	1982	Nikaah (OST)	Nikaah	Widely accepted
Dard-e-dil dard-e-aashna jaane	Bahadur Shah Zafar	—	c. 1976	Classical Ghazals	Non-film	
Dareeche be-sada koi nahin hai	Sabir Zafar	—	c. 1983	Ghazals Vol. 4	Non-film	
Dil dhadakne ka sabab yaad aaya	Nasir Kazmi	—	c. 1980	Ghazals Vol. 3	Non-film	
Dil mein ek lehar si uthi hai abhi	Nasir Kazmi	Pilu (light)	c. 1979	Ghazals Vol. 2	Non-film	
Fasle aise bhi honge	Adeem Hashmi	—	c. 1985	Ghazals Vol. 5	Non-film	
Gajalu ti thula thula aankha	King Mahendra (Nepal)	—	c. 1986	Nepali Ghazals	Non-film	Nepali
Heer	Punjabi traditional	—	c. 1984	Punjabi Classics	Non-film	
Hum tere shehar mein aaye hain	—	—	c. 1981	Ghazals Vol. 3	Non-film	
Humko kiske gham ne maara	Masroor Anwar	—	c. 1977	Classical Ghazals	Non-film	
Hungama Hai Kyun Barpa	Akbar Allahabadi	Darbari Kanada	c. 1978	Classical Ghazals	Non-film	Strong consensus
Itni muddat baad mile ho	Mohsin Naqvi	—	c. 1987	Ghazals Vol. 5	Non-film	
Kachchi deewar hoon thokar na lagana	—	—	c. 1982	Ghazals Vol. 4	Non-film	
Kal Chaudhvin Ki Raat Thi	Ibn-e-Insha	Yaman (light)	c. 1978	Classical Ghazals	Non-film	
Kehte hain mujhse ishq ka afsana chahiye	Qamar Jalalabadi	—	c. 1979	Ghazals Vol. 2	Non-film	
Khuli jo aankh	Farhat Shehzad	—	c. 1980	Ghazals Vol. 3	Non-film	
Khushboo jaise log mile	—	—	c. 1984	Ghazals Vol. 4	Non-film	
Kiya hai pyaar jise	Qateel Shifai	—	c. 1981	Ghazals Vol. 3	Non-film	
Koi ummeed bar nahin aati	Mirza Ghalib	—	c. 1976	Classical Ghazals	Non-film	
Main nazar se pee raha hoon	—	—	c. 1977	Ghazals Vol. 1	Non-film	
Mehfil mein baar baar	Agha Bismil	—	c. 1978	Classical Ghazals	Non-film	
Mere shauq da nai aitbaar tenu	Ghulam Mustafa Tabassum	—	c. 1983	Punjabi Classics	Non-film	Punjabi
Niyat-e-shauq bhar na jaaye kahin	Nasir Kazmi	—	c. 1982	Ghazals Vol. 4	Non-film	
Ni chambe diye bandh kaliye	Punjabi traditional	—	c. 1984	Punjabi Classics	Non-film	
Patta patta boota boota haal hamaara jaane hai	Mir Taqi Mir	Kafi (light)	c. 1976	Classical Ghazals	Non-film	
Phir kisi raahguzar par shayad	Ahmed Faraz	—	c. 1986	Ghazals Vol. 5	Non-film	
Phir saawan rut ki pawan chali	Nasir Kazmi	—	c. 1980	Ghazals Vol. 3	Non-film	
Roya karenge aap bhi	Momin Khan Momin	—	c. 1979	Classical Ghazals	Non-film	
Tamaam umr tera intezaar kiya	Hafeez Hoshiarpuri	—	c. 1981	Ghazals Vol. 3	Non-film	
Tumhare khat mein naya ik salaam kis ka tha	Daagh Dehlvi	—	c. 1977	Classical Ghazals	Non-film	
Woh kabhi mil jaayen to	Akhtar Sheerani	—	c. 1982	Ghazals Vol. 4	Non-film	
Woh jo hum mein tum mein qaraar tha	Momin Khan Momin	—	c. 1976	Classical Ghazals	Non-film	
Yeh baatein jhooti baatein hain	Ibn-e-Insha	—	c. 1984	Ghazals Vol. 4	Non-film	
Yeh dil yeh paagal dil	Mohsin Naqvi	—	c. 1989	Awaargi	Non-film	
Zehaal-e-miskin makun taghaful	Amir Khusro	—	c. 1980	Classical Ghazals	Non-film	

== Discography ==
- Tere Shehar Mein – 1996
- Lamha Lamha – 1997
- Mahtab – 1997
- Madhosh – 1999
- Khushboo – 2000
- Rabba Yaar Milaade – 2000
- Passions – 2000
- Sajda – 2001
- Visaal – 2004
- Aabshaar – 2006
- Parchhaiyan – 2006
- Husn-E-Ghazal – 2007
- The Enchanter – 2010
- Anjuman Behtareen Ghazalein
- At His Very Best Ghulam Ali
- Aawargee
- Dillagee
- Ghazalain – Live at Islamabad
- Ghazals
- Great Ghazals
- Geet Aur Ghazals
- Hungama Live in Concert Vol.1
- Haseen Lamhe
- Khwahish
- Live in USA Vol 2 – Private Mehfil Series
- Live in USA Vol 1 – Private Mehfil Series
- Mast Nazren -Ecstatic Glances Live in London, 1984
- Narayan Gopal, Ghulam Ali Ra Ma (Nepali Ghazals)
- Once More
- Poems of Love
- Saadgi
- Suraag – In Concert
- Suno
- Soulful
- Saugaat
- The Golden Moments – Patta Patta Boota Boota
- The Finest Recordings of Ghulam Ali
- The Golden Collection
- With Love
- Kalaam-E-Mohabbat (Ghazals written by Sant Darshan Singh Ji)
- Chupke Chupke – Live in Concert, England
- Rang Tarang vol 1,2
- Janay Walay
- Heer
- Ghulam Ali – The Very Best
- Ghulam Ali – Mehfil – Collection From Live Concerts
- The Best of Ghulam Ali
- Awargi—Ghulam Ali – Vocal CDNF418/419 Live. Vol.3 & 4.
- Aitbaar
- Aadaab Ustad (Ghazals)
- Ghulam Ali Vol.1 and 2
- A Ghazal Treat – Ghulam Ali in Concert;;
- Ghulam Ali in Concert
- Awargi (Live) Vol 1 and 2
- Moods and Emotions
- Ek Ehsaas – A Confluence of the Finest Ghazal Voices
- Best of Ghulam Ali
- Greatest Hits Of Ghulam Ali
- The Golden Moments Ghulam Ali (Vol.1)
- A Live Concert
- The Best of Ghulam Ali
- Once More
- Mehraab
- Ghulam Ali Live at India Gate – Swar Utsav 2001 – Songs of the Wandering Soul
- Ghalib – Ghazals – Ghulam Ali – Mehdi Hassan
- The Latest, the best"\
- Meraj-E-Ghazal, Ghulam Ali & Asha Bhosle

== Awards and recognition ==
- Pride of Performance Award in 1979 by the President of Pakistan
- Sitara-i-Imtiaz Award (Star of distinction) in 2013 by the President of Pakistan
