= A. R. Rahman discography =

Discography of A. R. Rahman

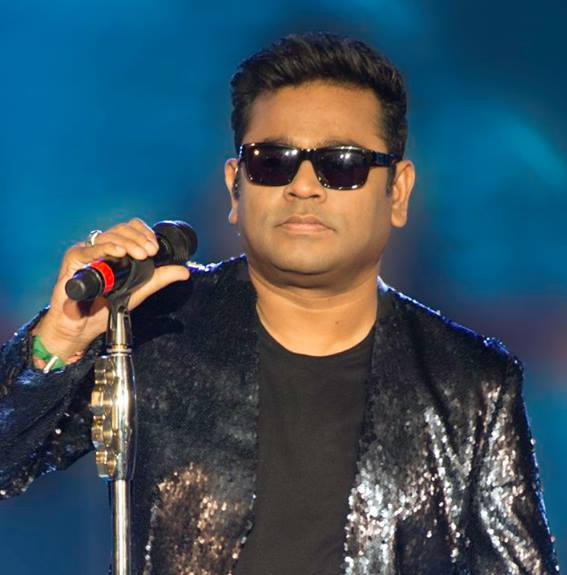
- A. R. Rahman at a musical concert in Chennai, India
- Studio albums: 20
- Extended plays: 1
- Soundtrack albums: 284 (including dubbed releases)
- Live albums: 3
- Compilation albums: 5
- Tribute albums: 1
- Singles: 10
- Video albums: 2
- Music videos: 22
- Original scores: 175
- Lyricist: 4 (8 songs)
- Web shows: 2

A. R. Rahman made his debut in Indian Music Industry with the 1992 Tamil film Roja. In his three decade long career, he has composed and produced original scores and songs for more than 175 films in various languages, namely Tamil, Hindi, Telugu, Malayalam, English, Persian and Mandarin.

== Original scores ==
=== 1990s ===
List of A. R. Rahman 1990s film credits
Year	Title	Director	Language	Notes
1992	Roja	Mani Ratnam	Tamil	
1992	Yoddha	Sangeeth Sivan	Malayalam	
1993	Pudhiya Mugam	Suresh Chandra Menon	Tamil	
1993	Gentleman	S. Shankar	Tamil	
1993	Nippu Ravva	A. Kodandarami Reddy	Telugu	Score only
1993	Kizhakku Cheemayile	Bharathiraja	Tamil	
1993	Uzhavan	Kathir	Tamil	
1993	Thiruda Thiruda	Mani Ratnam	Tamil	
1994	Vandicholai Chinraasu	Manoj Kumar	Tamil	
1994	Duet	K. Balachander	Tamil	
1994	Super Police	K. Murali Mohana Rao	Telugu	
1994	Gangmaster	B. Gopal	Telugu	
1994	May Maadham	Balu	Tamil	
1994	Kaadhalan	S. Shankar	Tamil	
1994	Pavithra	K. Subash	Tamil	
1994	Karuththamma	Bharathiraja	Tamil	
1994	Pudhiya Mannargal	Vikraman	Tamil	
1995	Bombay	Mani Ratnam	Tamil	
1995	Indira	Suhasini Maniratnam	Tamil	
1995	Rangeela	Ram Gopal Varma	Hindi	
1995	Muthu	K. S. Ravikumar	Tamil	
1996	Love Birds	P. Vasu	Tamil	
1996	Indian	S. Shankar	Tamil	
1996	Anthimanthaarai	Bharathiraja	Tamil	
1996	Kadhal Desam	Kathir	Tamil	
1996	Mr. Romeo	K. S. Ravi	Tamil	
1997	Minsara Kanavu	Rajiv Menon	Tamil	
1997	Iruvar	Mani Ratnam	Tamil	
1997	Daud	Ram Gopal Varma	Hindi	
1997	Fire	Deepa Mehta	Hindi	
1997	Ratchagan	Praveen Gandhi	Tamil	
1998	Kabhi Na Kabhi	Priyadarshan	Hindi	
1998	Jeans	S. Shankar	Tamil	
1998	Uyire..	Mani Ratnam	Tamil	
1998	Dil Se..	Mani Ratnam	Hindi	
1998	1947 Earth	Deepa Mehta	Hindi	
1998	Doli Saja Ke Rakhna	Priyadarshan	Hindi	
1999	En Swasa Kaatre	K. S. Ravi	Tamil	
1999	Padayappa	K. S. Ravikumar	Tamil	
1999	Kadhalar Dhinam	Kathir	Tamil	
1999	Sangamam	Suresh Krishna	Tamil	
1999	Taal	Subhash Ghai	Hindi	
1999	Jodi	Pravin Gandhi	Tamil	
1999	Mudhalvan	S. Shankar	Tamil	
1999	Taj Mahal	Bharathiraja	Tamil	
1999	Thakshak	Govind Nihalani	Hindi	

=== 2000s ===
List of A. R. Rahman 2000s film credits
Year	Title	Director	Language	Notes
2000	Pukar	Rajkumar Santoshi	Hindi	
2000	Fiza	Khalid Mohammed	Hindi	
2000	Alaipayuthey	Mani Ratnam	Tamil	
2000	Kandukondain Kandukondain	Rajiv Menon	Tamil	
2000	Rhythm	Vasanth	Tamil	
2000	Thenali	K. S. Ravikumar	Tamil	
2001	Zubeidaa	Shyam Benegal	Hindi	
2001	One 2 Ka 4	Shashilal K. Nair	Hindi	
2001	Lagaan	Ashutosh Gowariker	Hindi	
2001	Nayak: The Real Hero	S. Shankar	Hindi	
2001	Paarthale Paravasam	K. Balachander	Tamil	
	Star	Praveen Gandhi	Tamil	
2002	Alli Arjuna	Saran	Tamil	
2002	Kannathil Muthamittal	Mani Ratnam	Tamil	
2002	The Legend of Bhagat Singh	Rajkumar Santoshi	Hindi	
2002	Boys	S. Shankar	Tamil	
2002	Baba	Suresh Krissna	Tamil	
2002	Kadhal Virus	Kathir	Tamil	
2002	Saathiya	Shaad Ali and Mani Ratnam	Hindi	
2003	Parasuram	Arjun Sarja	Tamil	
2003	Warriors of Heaven and Earth	He Ping	Mandarin	
2003	Enakku 20 Unakku 18	Jyothi Krishna	Tamil	
2003	Nee Manasu Naaku Telusu	Jyothi Krishna	Telugu	
2003	Kangalal Kaidhu Sei	Bharathiraja	Tamil	
2003	Tehzeeb	Khalid Mohammed	Hindi	
2004	Meenaxi: A Tale of Three Cities	M. F. Hussain	Hindi	
2004	New	S. J. Suryah	Tamil	
2004	Naani	S. J. Suryah	Telugu	
2004	Aayutha Ezhuthu	Mani Ratnam	Tamil	
2004	Yuva	Mani Ratnam	Hindi	
2004	Swades	Ashutosh Gowariker	Hindi	
2004	Netaji Subhas Chandra Bose: The Forgotten Hero	Shyam Benegal	Hindi	
2005	Kisna: The Warrior Poet	Subhash Ghai	Hindi	Composed with Ismail Darbar
2005	Mangal Pandey: The Rising	Ketan Mehta	Hindi	
2005	Anbe Aaruyire	S. J. Suryah	Tamil	
2005	Water	Deepa Mehta	English	
2005	Rang De Basanti	Rakeysh Omprakash Mehra	Hindi	
2006	Sillunu Oru Kaadhal	Obeli N. Krishna	Tamil	
2006	Varalaru	K. S. Ravikumar	Tamil	
2007	Guru	Mani Ratnam	Hindi	
2007	Provoked	Jag Mundhra	English; Hindi	
2007	Bombil and Beatrice	Kaizad Gustad	English	
2007	Sivaji	S. Shankar	Tamil	
2007	Azhagiya Thamizh Magan	Bharathan	Tamil	
2007	Elizabeth: The Golden Age	Shekhar Kapur	English	Composed with Craig Armstrong
2008	Jodhaa Akbar	Ashutosh Gowariker	Hindi	
2008	Jaane Tu... Ya Jaane Na	Abbas Tyrewala	Hindi	
2008	Ada... A Way of Life	Tanvir Ahmad	Hindi	
2008	Sakkarakatti	Kala Prabhu	Tamil	
2008	Yuvvraaj	Subhash Ghai	Hindi	
2008	Ghajini	A. R. Murugadoss	Hindi	
2008	Slumdog Millionaire	Danny Boyle	English	
2009	Delhi-6	Rakeysh Omprakash Mehra	Hindi	
2009	Blue	Anthony D'souza	Hindi	
2009	Couples Retreat	Peter Billingsley	English	

=== 2010s ===
List of A. R. Rahman 2010s film credits
Year	Title	Director	Language	Notes
2010	Vinnaithaandi Varuvaayaa	Gautham Vasudev Menon	Tamil	
2010	Ye Maaya Chesave	Gautham Vasudev Menon	Telugu	
2010	Raavan	Mani Ratnam	Hindi	
2010	Raavanan	Mani Ratnam	Tamil	
2010	Komaram Puli	S. J. Suryah	Telugu	
2010	Enthiran	S. Shankar	Tamil	
2010	Jhootha Hi Sahi	Abbas Tyrewala	Hindi	
2010	127 Hours	Danny Boyle	English	
2011	Rockstar	Imtiaz Ali	Hindi	
2011	Ekk Deewana Tha	Gautham Vasudev Menon	Hindi	
2012	People like Us	Alex Kurtzman	English	
2012	Jab Tak Hai Jaan	Yash Chopra	Hindi	
2012	Kadal	Mani Ratnam	Tamil	
2013	Maryan	Bharat Bala	Tamil	
2013	Raanjhanaa	Anand L. Rai	Hindi	
2014	Highway	Imtiaz Ali	Hindi	
2014	Kochadaiiyaan	Soundarya Rajinikanth	Tamil	
2014	Million Dollar Arm	Craig Gillespie	English	
2014	Lekar Hum Deewana Dil	Arif Ali	Hindi	
2014	The Hundred-Foot Journey	Lasse Hallström	English	
2014	Kaaviya Thalaivan	G. Vasanthabalan	Tamil	
2014	Lingaa	K. S. Ravikumar	Tamil	
2014	I	S. Shankar	Tamil	
2015	O Kadhal Kanmani	Mani Ratnam	Tamil	
2015	Tamasha	Imtiaz Ali	Hindi	
2015	Muhammad: The Messenger of God	Majid Majidi	Persian	
2016	24	Vikram Kumar	Tamil	
2016	Achcham Yenbadhu Madamaiyada	Gautham Vasudev Menon	Tamil	
2016	Sahasam Swasaga Sagipo	Gautham Vasudev Menon	Telugu	
2016	Pele	Jeff Zimbalist, Michael Zimbalist	English	
2016	Mohenjo Daro	Ashutosh Gowariker	Hindi	
2017	OK Jaanu	Shaad Ali	Hindi	
2017	Kaatru Veliyidai	Mani Ratnam	Tamil	
2017	Sachin: A Billion Dreams	James Erskine	Hindi	
2017	Cinema Veeran	Aishwarya Rajinikanth	Tamil	Documentary
2017	Mom	Ravi Udyawar	Hindi	
2017	Viceroy's House	Gurinder Chadha	English	
2017	Mersal	Atlee	Tamil	
2017	Daughters of Destiny	Vanessa Roth	English	Documentary
2018	Beyond the Clouds	Majid Majidi	Hindi	
2018	Love Sonia	Tabrez Noorani	Hindi	
2018	Chekka Chivantha Vaanam	Mani Ratnam	Tamil	
2018	Sarkar	A. R. Murugadoss	Tamil	
2018	2.0	S. Shankar	Tamil	
2019	The Fakir Of Venice	Anand Surapur	Hindi	
2019	Blinded by the Light	Gurinder Chadha	English	
2019	Sarvam Thaala Mayam	Rajiv Menon	Tamil	
2019	Bigil	Atlee	Tamil	

=== 2020s ===
List of A. R. Rahman 2020s film credits
Year	Title	Director	Language	Notes
2020	Shikara	Vidhu Vinod Chopra	Hindi	
2020	99 Songs	Vishwesh Krishnamoorthy	Hindi	
2020	Karthik Dial Seytha Yenn	Gautham Vasudev Menon	Tamil	Short film
2020	Dil Bechara	Mukesh Chhabra	Hindi	
2021	Mimi	Laxman Utekar	Hindi	
2021	Navarasa	Arvind Swamy	Tamil	Segment: Rowthiram
2021	House of Secrets: The Burari Deaths	Leena Yadav and Anubhav Chopra	Hindi	Documentary
2021	No Land's Man	Mostofa Sarwar Farooki	English	
2021	Atrangi Re	Aanand L. Rai	Hindi	
2022	Heropanti 2	Ahmed Khan	Hindi	
2022	Iravin Nizhal	R. Parthiban	Tamil	
2022	Malayankunju	Sajimon Prabhakar	Malayalam	
2022	Cobra	R. Ajay Gnanamuthu	Tamil	
2022	Vendhu Thanindhathu Kaadu	Gautham Vasudev Menon	Tamil	
2022	Ponniyin Selvan: I	Mani Ratnam	Tamil	
2022	Mili	Xavier Mathkutty	Hindi	
2022	Le Musk	A. R. Rahman	English	
2023	Gandhi Godse - Ek Yudh	Rajkumar Santoshi	Hindi	
2023	Pathu Thala	Obeli N. Krishna	Tamil	
2023	Ponniyin Selvan: II	Mani Ratnam	Tamil	
2023	Maamannan	Mari Selvaraj	Tamil	
2023	Pippa	Raja Krishna Menon	Hindi	
2024	Ayalaan	R. Ravikumar	Tamil	
2024	Lal Salaam	Aishwarya Rajinikanth	Tamil	
2024	Aadujeevitham	Blessy	Malayalam	
2024	Maidaan	Amit Sharma	Hindi	
2024	Amar Singh Chamkila	Imtiaz Ali	Hindi	
2024	Raayan	Dhanush	Tamil	
2025	Kadhalikka Neramillai	Kiruthiga Udhayanidhi	Tamil	
2025	Chhaava	Laxman Utekar	Hindi	
2025	Thug Life	Mani Ratnam	Tamil	
2025	Ufff Yeh Siyapaa	G. Ashok	Sound	
2025	Tere Ishk Mein	Aanand L. Rai	Hindi	
2026	Gandhi Talks	Kishor Pandurang Belekar	Sound	
2026	Baab	Nayla Al Khaja	Arabic	
2026	Peddi	Buchi Babu Sana	Telugu	
2026	Main Vaapas Aaunga	Imtiaz Ali	Hindi	
2026	Batwara 1947	Rajkumar Santoshi	Hindi	
2026	Ramayana: Part 1	Nitesh Tiwari	Hindi	Composed with Hans Zimmer

=== Upcoming ===
List of A. R. Rahman upcoming film projects
Year	Title	Director	Language	Notes
2027	Inji Vellam	Mani Ratnam	Tamil	Post-Production
2028	Ramayana: Part 2	Nitesh Tiwari	Hindi	Filming
TBA	Moon Walk	Manoj N. S	Tamil	Completed
TBA	Genie	Bhuvanesh Arjunan (Arjunan Jr.)	Tamil	Delayed
TBA	Banaras	BharatBala	Hindi	Completed
TBA	Dilkashi	Lijo Jose Pellissery	Hindi	Post-Production
TBA	Killer	S.J. Suryah	Tamil	Filming
TBA	Gandhi	Hansal Mehta	Hindi	Completed (TV series)

== Original soundtracks ==
Year	Tamil	Hindi	English	Other languages
1992	Roja			
1992				Yoddha (Malayalam)
1993	Uzhavan			
1993	Thiruda Thiruda			
1993	Vandicholai Chinraasu			
1993	Kizhakku Cheemayile			Palnati Pourusham (1994) (Telugu) ♦
1993	Pudhiya Mannargal			
1993	Pudhiya Mugam	Vishwavidhaata (1997) ♦		
1993	Gentleman			
1994				Super Police (Telugu)
1994	Pavithra			
1994	May Madham			Hrudayanjali (1998 - Telugu)
1994	Karuththamma			
1994	Kaadhalan			
1994	Duet			
1994				Gangmaster (Telugu)
1995	Indira			
1995	Bombay			
1995		Rangeela		
1995	Muthu			
1996	Love Birds			
1996	Indian			
1996	Kadhal Desam			Duniya Dilwalon Ki(Hindi),Prema Desam (Telugu)
1996		Fire	Fire	
1996	Mr. Romeo			
1996	Anthimanthaarai			
1997	Minsara Kanavu	Sapnay		Meruppu Kalalu (Telugu)
1997	Iruvar			Iddaru (Telugu)
1997		Daud		Ottam (Tamil); 50-50 (Telugu)
1997	Ratchagan			
1998	Jeans			
1998	Uyire..	Dil Se..		
1998	Mona Lisa	Kabhi Na Kabhi		
1998		Earth	Earth	
1998	Oonjal	Doli Saja Ke Rakhna		
1999	En Swasa Kaatre			
1999	Jodi			Sajni (2006) (Kannada) ♦!
1999	Padayappa			
1999	Thaalam	Taal		
1999		Thakshak		
1999	Kadhalar Dhinam			
1999	Sangamam			
1999	Taj Mahal			
1999	Mudhalvan	Nayak (2001)		
2000	Alaipayuthey	Saathiya (2002) ♦		
2000		Fiza ✦		
2000	Kandukondain Kandukondain			
2000		Pukar		
2000	Rhythm			
2000	Thenali			
2000		Zubeidaa		
2001		One 2 Ka 4		
2001		Love You Hamesha		
2001	Star			
2001		Lagaan		
2001	Paarthale Paravasam			
2001	Alli Arjuna			
2002	Kannathil Muthamittal			
2002		The Legend of Bhagat Singh		
2002	Baba			
2002	Kadhal Virus			
2003	Udhaya !			
2003	Parasuram			
2003	Boys			
2003		Tehzeeb		
2003	Enakku 20 Unakku 18			Nee Manasu Naaku Telusu (Telugu)
2003				Warriors of Heaven and Earth (Mandarin)
2003	Kangalal Kaidhu Sei			
2004		Meenaxi: A Tale of Three Cities		
2004	Aaytha Ezhuthu	Yuva		
2004	Udhaya			
2004	New			Naani (Telugu)
2004		Dil Ne Jise Apna Kahaa !		
2004		Lakeer – Forbidden Lines		
2004		Swades		
2005		Kisna: The Warrior Poet		
2005		Netaji Subhas Chandra Bose: The Forgotten Hero		
2005		Mangal Pandey: The Rising		
2005	Anbe Aaruyire			
2005		Rang De Basanti		
2005		Water		
2006	Varalaru			Godfather (2012) (Kannada) ♦ !
2006	Sillunu Oru Kaadhal			
2006		Guru		
2007	Sivaji			
2007			Provoked	
2007			Bombil and Beatrice	
2007			Elizabeth: The Golden Age	
2007	Azhagiya Thamizh Magan			
2008		Jodhaa Akbar		
2008		Jaane Tu... Ya Jaane Na		
2008		Ada... A Way of Life		
2008	Sakkarakatti			
2008		Yuvvraaj		
2008		Ghajini		
2008			Slumdog Millionaire	
2009		Delhi-6		
2009		Blue		
2009			Couples Retreat	
2010	Vinnaithaandi Varuvaayaa	Ekk Deewana Tha (2011) ♦		Ye Maaya Chesave (Telugu)
2010	Raavanan	Raavan		
2010				Komaram Puli (Telugu)
2010	Enthiran			
2010		Jhootha Hi Sahi		
2010			127 Hours	
2011		Rockstar		
2012			People Like Us	
2012		Jab Tak Hai Jaan		
2012	Kadal			
2013	Maryan			
2013		Raanjhanaa		
2014		Highway		
2014	Kochadaiiyaan			
2014			Million Dollar Arm	
2014		Lekar Hum Deewana Dil		
2014			The Hundred-Foot Journey	
2014	Kaaviya Thalaivan			
2014	I			
2014	Lingaa			
2015	O Kadhal Kanmani	Ok Jaanu (2017)		
2015		Tamasha		
2015				Muhammad: The Messenger of God (Persian)
2016	24			
2016	Achcham Yenbadhu Madamaiyada			Sahasam Swasaga Sagipo (Telugu)
2016			Pele	
2016		Mohenjo Daro		
2017	Kaatru Veliyidai			
2017			Viceroy's House	
2017		Mom		
2017		Sachin: A Billion Dreams		
2017	Mersal			
2018	2.0			
2018		Beyond the Clouds		
2018		Sanju		
2018		Love Sonia		
2018	Chekka Chivantha Vaanam			
2018	Sarkar			
2019		The Fakir of Venice		
2019			Blinded by the Light	
2019	Sarvam Thaala Mayam			
2019	Bigil			
2020		Dil Bechara		
2021		99 Songs		
2021		Mimi		
2021		Atrangi Re		
2022				Malayankunju (Malayalam)
2022		Heropanti 2		
2022	Iravin Nizhal			
2022	Cobra			
2022	Vendhu Thanindhathu Kaadu			
2022	Ponniyin Selvan: I			
2022		Mili		
2023		Gandhi Godse – Ek Yudh		
2023	Pathu Thala			
2023	Ponniyin Selvan: II			
2023	Maamannan			
2023		Pippa		
2023		Animal		
2024	Ayalaan			
2024	Lal Salaam			
2024				Aadujeevitham (Malayalam)
2024		Maidaan		
2024		Amar Singh Chamkila		
2024	Raayan			
2025	Kadhalikka Neramillai			
2025		Chhaava		
2025	Thug Life			
2025		Ufff Yeh Siyapaa		
2025		Tere Ishk Mein		
2026				Gandhi Talks
2026				Peddi (Telugu)
2026		Main Vaapas Aaunga		
2026		Batwara 1947		
2026		Ramayana: Part 1		

Notes:

- The films are listed in order that the music released, regardless of the dates the film released.
- The year next to the title of the affected films indicates the release year of the either dubbed or remade version in the named language later than the original version.
- ♦ Indicates a film remade in another language with a different cast, featuring music reused from Rahman's compositions for the original.
- ! indicates only the songs are composed by Rahman, while the background score is composed by another composer.
- ✦ indicates only one song are composed by Rahman, while other songs are composed by another composer.
- The films Nayak: The Real Hero (2001, Hindi), Saathiya (2002, Hindi), Godfather (2012, Kannada), and Ok Jaanu (2017, Hindi) were remakes of the films Mudhalvan (1999, Tamil), Alai Payuthey (2000, Tamil), Varalaru (2006, Tamil) and O Kadhal Kanmani (2015, Tamil) respectively. The soundtracks were reused with changes and additional songs.
- The films Yuva (2004, Hindi), Raavanan (2010, Tamil) and Ye Maaya Chesave (2010, Telugu) were simultaneous makes of the films Aaytha Ezhuthu (2004, Tamil), Raavan (2010, Hindi) and Vinnaithaandi Varuvaaya (2010, Tamil), respectively. Ekk Deewana Tha was a remake of Vinnaithaandi Varuvaaya (2010, Tamil) and Ye Maaya Chesave (2010, Telugu). The soundtracks were reused with changes and additional vocals.
- He has contributed one song: "Piya Haji Ali" to Fiza (1999, Hindi).
- He reused the songs from May Maadham for Love You Hamesha although the film wasn't a remake.
- He has also contributed a promotional song with Tamil lyrics in the movie Lavender (Malayalam).

== As playback singer ==
Year	Song	Work	Co-singer	Language
1992	"Chinna Chinna Aasai"	Roja	Minmini	Tamil
1994	"Urvasi Urvasi"	Kaadhalan	Suresh Peters	Tamil
1995	"Humma Humma"	Bombay	Suresh Peters, Swarnalatha	Tamil
1995	"Kannalanae"	Bombay	K. S. Chithra & Chorus	Tamil
1995	"Poovukkenna Poottu"	Bombay	Noel, Anupama, Shubha & G. V. Prakash Kumar	Tamil
1995	"Mangta Hai Kya"	Rangeela	Shweta Shetty	Hindi
1996	"No Problem"	Love Birds	Apache Indian	Tamil
1996	"Mustafa Mustafa"	Kadhal Desam	Solo	Tamil
1996	"Hello Doctor"	Kadhal Desam	Storms, Neol, Anupama	Tamil
1996	"Kalloori Salai"	Kadhal Desam	Hariharan, Aslam Mustafa	Tamil
1997	"Aayirathil Naan Oruvan"	Iruvar	Mano	Tamil
1997	"Kannai Katikolathe"	Iruvar	Hariharan	Tamil
1998	"Columbus Columbus"	Jeans	Solo	Tamil
1998	"Dil Se Re"	Dil Se..	Anupama, Anuradha Sriram	Hindi
1999	"Ishq Bina"	Taal	Anuradha Sriram, Sujatha Mohan, Sonu Nigam	Hindi
2000	"Piya Haji Ali"	Fiza	Srinivas, Murtaza Khan, Qadir Khan	Hindi
2001	"Chale Chalo"	Lagaan	Srinivas	Hindi
2002	"Vellai Pookal"	Kannathil Muthamittal	Solo	Tamil
2002	"Mere Yaar Mila De"	Saathiya	Solo	Hindi
2004	"Jana Gana Mana"	Aaytha Ezhuthu	Karthik	Tamil
2004	"Yaakai Thiri"	Aaytha Ezhuthu	Sunitha Sarathy, Pop Shalini	Tamil
2004	"Yeh Jo Des Hai Tera"	Swades	Solo	Hindi
2005	"Aazadi"	Netaji Subhas Chandra Bose: The Forgotten Hero	Anuradha Sriram	Hindi
2005	"Zikr"	Netaji Subhas Chandra Bose: The Forgotten Hero	Solo	Hindi
2005	"Al Maddath Maula"	Mangal Pandey: The Rising	Kailash Kher, Murtuza Khan, Kadir	Hindi
2005	"Aararai Kodi"	Anbe Aaruyire	Solo	Tamil
2006	"Khalbali"	Rang De Basanti	Mohammed Aslam, Naccim	Hindi
2006	"Lukka Chuppi"	Rang De Basanti	Lata Mangeshkar	Hindi
2006	"Rubaroo"	Rang De Basanti	Naresh Iyer	Hindi
2006	"Theeyil Vizhunda"	Varalaru	Solo	Tamil
2006	"New York Nagaram"	Sillunu Oru Kaadhal	Solo	Tamil/Telugu
2007	"Tere Bina"	Guru	Chinmayi Sripaada, Murtuza Khan, Qadir Khan	Hindi
2007	"Ay Hairathe"	Guru	Hariharan, Alka Yagnik	Hindi
2007	"Jaage Hain"	Guru	K.S.Chithra, Madras Chorale Group	Hindi
2007	"Athiradee"	Sivaji	Sayanora Philip	Tamil
2007	"Sahana Saaral"	Sivaji	Udit Narayan, Chinmayi Sripaada	Tamil
2007	"Ellapugazhum"	Azhagiya Thamizh Magan	Solo	Tamil
2008	"Khwaja Mere Khwaja"	Jodhaa Akbar	Solo	Hindi
2008	"Tu Bole Main Boloon"	Jaane Tu... Ya Jaane Na	Solo	Hindi
2008	"Meherbaan"	Ada... A Way of Life	Solo	Hindi
2008	"Marudaani"	Sakkarakatti	Madhushree	Tamil
2008	"Tu Muskura"	Yuvvraaj	Javed Ali, Alka Yagnik	Hindi
2008	"Tu Mera Dost Hai"	Yuvvraaj	Benny Dayal, Shreya Ghoshal	Hindi
2008	"Dil Ka Rishta"	Yuvvraaj	Sonu Nigam, Roop Kumar Rathod, Clinton Cerejo, Suzanne, Sunaina, Vivienne Pocha, Naresh Iyer, Benny Dayal, Blaaze	Hindi
2008	"O...Saya"	Slumdog Millionaire	M I A	English
2009	"Rehna Tu"	Delhi-6	Benny Dayal, Tanvi Shah	Hindi
2009	"Kuru Kuru"	Couples Retreat	Solo	English
2009	"NaNa"	Couples Retreat	Blaaze, Vivian Chaix, A. R. Ameen, Clinton Cerejo & Dominique Cerejo	English
2010	"Mannipaaya"	Vinnaithaandi Varuvaayaa	Shreya Ghoshal	Tamil
2010	"Maaralante Lokam"	Komaram Puli	Solo	Telugu
2010	"Pudhiya Manidha"	Endhiran	S. P. Balasubrahmanyam, Khatija Rahman	Tamil
2010	"Irumbile Oru Irudhaiyam"	Endhiran	Kash n' Krissy	Tamil
2011	"Kun Faya Kun"	Rockstar	Javed Ali, Mohit Chauhan	Hindi
2011	"Naadaan Parindey"	Rockstar	Mohit Chauhan	Hindi
2012	"Kya Hai Mohabbat"	Ekk Deewana Tha	Solo	Hindi
2012	"Sharminda Hoon"	Ekk Deewana Tha	Madhushree	Hindi
2012	"Nenjukkule"	Kadal	Shakthisree Gopalan	Tamil
2012	"Elay Keechaan"	Kadal	Solo	Tamil
2013	"Nenje Yaezhu"	Maryan	Solo	Tamil
2013	"I Love My Africa"	Maryan	Blaaze, Madras Youth Choir	Tamil
2013	"Kadal Raasa Naan"	Maryan	Yuvan Shankar Raja	Tamil
2013	"Tu Mun Shudi"	Raanjhanaa	Rabbi Shergill	Hindi/Tamil
2013	"Aise Na Dekho"	Raanjhanaa	Karthik	Hindi/Tamil
2014	"Maahi Ve"	Highway	Solo	Hindi
2014	"Patakha Guddi (Male Version)"	Highway	Solo	Hindi
2014	"Karma Veerane"	Kochadaiyaan	A. R. Raihanah	Tamil
2014	"Khalifa"	Lekar Hum Deewana Dil	Shweta Pandit, Suzanne D'Mello, Hriday Gattani, Mahesh Vinayakram	Hindi
2014	"My Mind Is a Stranger Without You"	The Hundred-Foot Journey	Solange Merdinian	English
2014	"Indiane Vaa"	Lingaa	Solo	Tamil
2015	"Mental Manadhil (Male)"	O Kadhal Kanmani	Jonita Gandhi	Tamil
2015	"Theera Ula"	O Kadhal Kanmani	Darshana, Nikita Gandhi	Tamil
2015	"Malargal Kaettaen"	O Kadhal Kanmani	K. S. Chitra	Tamil
2015	"Tu Koi Aur Hai"	Tamasha	Alma Ferovic, Arjun Chandy	Hindi
2016	"Laakhon Salaam"	Jugni	Solo	Hindi
2016	"Tu Hai"	Mohenjo Daro	Sanah Moidutty	Hindi
2016	"Sindhu Ma"	Mohenjo Daro	Sanah Moidutty	Hindi
2016	"Mohenjo Mohenjo"	Mohenjo Daro	Arijit Singh, Bela Shende, Sanah Moidutty	Hindi
2017	"OK Jaanu"	OK Jaanu	Srinidhi Venkatesh	Hindi
2017	"Jee Lein"	OK Jaanu	Arjun Chandy, Neeti Mohan	Hindi
2017	"O Sona Tere Liye"	Mom	Shashaa Tirupati	Hindi
2017	"Neethanae"	Mersal	Shreya Ghoshal	Tamil
2018	"I Am More"	Love Sonia	Bishop Briggs	English
2018	"Mazhai Kuruvi"	Chekka Chivantha Vaanam	Solo	Tamil
2018	"Oru Viral Puratchi"	Sarkar	Srinidhi Venkatesh	Tamil
2018	"Jai Hind India"	Hockey World Cup	Solo	Hindi
2019	"Wako Naam Fakir"	The Fakir of Venice	Arjun Chandy, Abhay Jodhpurkar	Hindi
2019	"Marvel Anthem"	Promotional Track for Avengers: Endgame	Backing Vocals by Arjun Chandy, Nakul Abhyankar, MC Heam, Suryansh, Hiral Viradia, Lavita Lobo, Deepthi Suresh, Veena Murali, Srinivas, Sowmya, Madumitha, Shenbagaraj, Jaganjoth, Mayank, Soundarya, Aravind Srinivas, Jithin, Santosh, Akshara	Hindi/Tamil/Telugu
2019	"Singappenney"	Bigil	Shashaa Tirupati	Tamil
2020	"Sai Shirdi Sai"	99 Songs	Bela Shende	Hindi/Tamil/Telugu
2020	"Sofia"	99 Songs	Shashwat Singh	Hindi/Tamil/Telugu
2020	"O Aashiqa"	99 Songs	Shashwat Singh	Hindi/Tamil/Telugu
2020	"Dil Bechara Title Track"	Dil Bechara		Hindi
2020	"Hum Haar Nahi Manenge"	HDFC Bank COVID-19	Khatija Rahman, Mika Singh, Clinton Cerejo, Jonita Gandhi, Javed Ali, Mohit Chauhan, Sashaa Tirupathi, Sid sriram, Shruti Hassan, Harshdeep kaur	Hindi
2021	"Rihaayi De"	Mimi		Hindi
2022	"DaFa Kar"	Heropanti 2	Hiral Viradia	Hindi
2022	"Muthu's Journey"	Vendhu Thanindhathu Kaadu		Tamil
2022	"Marakuma Nenjam"	Vendhu Thanindhathu Kaadu		Tamil
2022	"Ponni Nadhi"	Ponniyin Selvan: I	A. R. Raihanah, Bamba Bakya	Tamil
2022	"Uyir Urugudhey"	Cobra	Solo	Tamil
2023	''Namma Satham''	Pathu Thala	Yogi Seker	Tamil
2023	"PS Anthem"	Ponniyin Selvan: II	Nabyla	Tamil
2023	''Jigu Jigu Railu''	Maamannan	Solo	Tamil
2024	"Vera Level Sago"	Ayalaan	Solo	Tamil
2024	"Maanja Nee"	Ayalaan	A. R. Ameen	Tamil
2024	"Jalali"	Lal Salaam	Sarath Santhosh	Tamil
2024	"Adangaatha Asuran"	Raayan	Dhanush	Tamil
2024	"Oh Raaya"	Raayan	Ganavya Doraisamy	Tamil
2024	"Oh Raaya" - (((D)))	Raayan	Ganavya Doraisamy	Telugu
2024	"Oh Raaya" - (((D)))	Raayan	Ganavya Doraisamy	Hindi
2024	Hope Song	The Goat Life	Rianjali	Malayalam, Tamil, Telugu, Hindi & English
2024	''Bol Mohabbat''	Amar Singh Chamkila	Kailash Kher	Hindi
2024	"Team India Hai Hum"	Maidaan	Nakul Abhyankar	Hindi
2024	"Jaane Do"	Maidaan	Hiral Viradia	Hindi
2025	"Yennai Izhukkuthadi"	Kadhalikka Neramillai	Dhee	Tamil
2025	"Aaya Re Toofan"	Chhaava	Vaishali Samant	Hindi
2025	"Zinda Rahey"	Chhaava	Hiral Viradia	Hindi
2025	"Anju Vanna Poove (Reprise)	Thug Life		Tamil
2025	"Deewaana Deewaana"	Tere Ishk Mein		Hindi
2025	"Kannae Kanmaniye"	Tere Ishk Mein - (((D)))		Tamil
2025	"Dil Parinda"	Ufff Yeh Siyapaa		Hindi

Note

- In the language column, "/" is used for dubbed in other languages.
- ", " shows that the original song have contain many languages.

== As lyricist ==
Year	Song	Work	Co-lyricist	Language
2010	"Naan Varuvene"	Raavanan	Vairamuthu	Tamil
2013	"Nenjae Ezhu"	Maryan	Kabilan, Kutti Revathi	Tamil
2013	"Innum Konjam Neram"	Maryan	Kabilan	Tamil
2013	"Yenga Pona Raasaa"	Maryan	Kutti Revathi	Tamil
2015	"Kaara Attakkaaraa"	O Kadhal Kanmani	Mani Ratnam, Aaryan Dinesh Kanagaratnam	Tamil
2015	"Mental Manadhil" (Male)	O Kadhal Kanmani	Mani Ratnam	Tamil
2015	"Mental Manadhil" (Female)	O Kadhal Kanmani	Mani Ratnam	Tamil
2024	"Maanja Nee"	Ayalaan	Sivakarthikeyan, ThoughtsForNow	Tamil

== Studio albums ==
Year	Title	Tracks
2017	The Flying Lotus	Track list: 1. Tiranga (4:19); 2. Masoom (1:15); 3. Pukaar (1:40); 4. Bechain (1:52); 5. Demonetisation 2016 (4:25); 6. Subah (2:44); 7. Manuhaar (1:34); 8. Mustakbil (1:11); 9. The Flying Lotus (19:03)
2014	Raunaq	
2013	Coke Studio	
2011	SuperHeavy	With SuperHeavy
2011	Gems (Studio album by Michael Bolton)	Track list: 1. Sajna - Michael Bolton feat. A. R. Rahman; 1 out of 12 tracks
2011	Connections	Track list: 1. Silent Invocation 1; 2. Silent Invocation 2; 3. Silent Invocation 3; 4. Mylapore Blues; 5. Himalaya; 6. Machhar Khan; 7. Kural; 8. Mann Chandra
2011	Connections... A Journey Through Anthems	Track list: 1. Jiya Se Jiya - A. R. Rahman, Karthik, Raqeeb Alam; 2. Meherbaan; 3. Pray for me brother-Rahman, Blaaze; 4. Dil Se Re; 5. Ek Mohabbat; 6. Bombay Theme; 7. Pray For Me Brother (Instrumental); 8. Jiya Se Jiya (club mix)
2008	Nokia Connections	Track list: 1. Jiya Se Jiya - Karthik, Raqeeb Alam; 2. Mann Chanda Re - Sukhwinder Singh; 3. Kural - Blaaze; 4. Silent Invocation A - instrumental 5. Silent Invocation B - instrumental 6. Silent Invocation C - instrumental 7. Mylapore Blues - instrumental 8. Himalaya - instrumental 9. Mosquito - instrumental
2004	Choreography (Studio album by Vanessa-Mae)	Track list: 1. Raga's Dance - instrumental; 1 out of 10 tracks
2003	Harem (Studio album by Sarah Brightman)	Track list: 1. The Journey Home - Sarah Brightman; 1 out of 14 tracks
2001	Indian Mantra	Track list: 1. Maa Tujhe Salaam - A. R. Rahman; 2. Gurus of Peace - Nusrat Fateh Ali Khan, A. R. Rahman; 3. Only You - A. R. Rahman; 4. Jana Gana Mana - instrumental 5. Jana Gana Mana - various artists; 5 out of 10 tracks
2000	Jana Gana Mana	Track list: 1. Jana Gana Mana Collective Vocal Version - various artists
1998	Gurus of Peace	Track list: 1. Masoom - A. R. Rahman; 1 out of 4 tracks
1997	Vande Mataram	Track list: 1. Maa Tujhe Salaam - A. R. Rahman; 2. Revival - various artists, arranged by A. R. Rahman; 3. Gurus of Peace - Nusrat Fateh Ali Khan, A. R. Rahman; 4. Tauba Tauba - A. R. Rahman; 5. Only You - A. R. Rahman; 6. Missing - instrumental 7. Thai Mannai Vanakkam - A. R. Rahman; 8. Masoom - A. R. Rahman; 9. Musafir - A. R. Rahman, Faye
1994	Fantasy / Andhi Maalai	Track list: 1. Nilavukku Pakkam - S. P. Balasubrahmanyam, S. Janaki, Chorus; 2. Andhi Maalai Kovil - S. Janaki; 3. Thottaach Chinungi Chediye - Mano, Chorus; 4. Kaathal Sugamaanathu - Mano, S. Janaki; 5. Muthal Muththam - S. Janaki; 6. Iniya Kalloori - Dinesh; 7. Pengal Ingu Yaarum - Mano; 8. Instrumental Track 1 - instrumental 9. Instrumental Track 2 - instrumental 10. Instrumental Track 3 - instrumental 11. Instrumental Track 4 - instrumental; as a keyboardist only
1992	Then Vandhu Paayedhu	Track list: 1. Kadhalithu Paar - recital 2. Viragu - recital 3. Irakka Mudiyadha Siluvai - recital 4. O Nayagara - recital 5. Maji Manthiri - recital 6. Kadhal Chithan - recital 7. Yendiyamma Kuthavacha - recital 8. Andhi - recital 9. Rathiri Raagam - recital 10. Nadhiyodu Vuraiyadi - recital 11. Kadaisippagal - recital 12. Avasarathalattu - recital; background score only
1992	Colours	Track list: 1. Quest For Music - instrumental 2. Valliya Naayaganae - instrumental 3. Evolution - instrumental 4. Samaja Varagamana - instrumental 5. Abharaama Bhakti - instrumental; as a keyboardist only
1991	Shubhaa – Set Me Freeee	Track list: 1. Over The Hill - Shubha; 2. Zombie - Shubha; 3. Boogie Night - Shubha; 4. Set Me Free - Shubha; 5. Heart Break - Shubha; 6. She Says - Shubha; 7. Dark Moon - Shubha; 8. Take Nine - Shubha
1989	Deen Isai Maalai	Track list: 1. Allahu - Mano; 2. Arputhangal - Shahul Hameed; 3. Enthisaiullorum - Shahul Hameed; 4. Ellapugazhum Iraivanukke - Shahul Hameed; 5. Idhayangalellam - Sujatha Mohan; 6. Iraiyoreen Irai Petra - Shahul Hameed, Sujatha Mohan; 7. Deen Valarkum - Mano; 8. Nabi Natharin - Shahul Hameed; 9. Arulin Vadivaaga - Sujatha Mohan; 10. Aalum Nayagar - Mano; 11. Arpootham Oongum - Shahul Hameed
1987	Gotte Kanakavva	record producer

== Singles ==
=== As lead artist ===
Year	Title	Notes
2026	"Aamaasee"	composed for Netflix movie 'Best of the best'
2021	"Amar Shonar Bangla"	YouTube Single with lyrics by Zulfiqer Russell
2019	"Light Upon Light"	YouTube Single ft. Sami Yusuf
2019	"Ahimsa"	Collaboration with U2
2019	A. R. Ameen's "Sago"	Credited for composition and as a co-producer
2019	Amal Maher's "Asl El Ehsas"	credited for "Music Arrangement" (collaboration with Egyptian singer Amal Maher)
2021	"Allipoola Vennela"	Telugu YouTube Single ft. Mekha Rajan, Anagha, Angelina
2015	"Humko Mann Ki Shakti Dena"	More A tribute song to the victims of the 2008 Mumbai attacks. The song was originally written by poet Gulzar and composed by Vasant Desai for the film Guddi. A. R. Rahman has sung and re-composed the track retaining the lyrics by Gulzar.
2012	"Infinite Love	More The song was recorded to instill faith and optimism in people prior to the predicted Doomsday on 21 December 2012.
2012	"Nimma Nimma"	More The song was composed for the 2012 Summer Olympics and was released through the album Isles of Wonder.
2012	"Oscar Sangamam"	More Rahman's interpretation of the theme for the 84th Academy Awards, composed originally by Hans Zimmer. The song was performed at the ceremony by Rahman and was later released for digital download as a track in the album "Celebrate the Music – The 84th Academy Awards".
2011	"Satyameva Jayathe"	More Sanskrit song for SuperHeavy.
2011	"Miracle Worker"	More "Miracle Worker" is the debut single by rock supergroup SuperHeavy from their self-titled debut studio album.
2010	"Semmozhiyaana Tamizh Mozhiyaam"	More Tamil song composed by A. R. Rahman, penned by M. Karunanidhi and performed by several leading Tamil artistes of over three generations. It is officially the theme song for the World Classical Tamil Conference 2010.
2010	"Jai Jai Garavi Gujarat"	More Gujarati song composed by A. R. Rahman, penned by Narmad and performed by various artists. It was composed as part of the 50th year of formation of Gujarat state.
2009	"Jai Ho! (You Are My Destiny)" (with The Pussycat Dolls featuring Nicole Scherzinger) (Charts – US:#15 UK:#3 AUS:#1CAN:#5)	More Pop song composed by A. R. Rahman and performed by The Pussycat Dolls featuring Nicole Scherzinger, from the album Doll Domination 2.0. The song is the English interpretation of the song Jai Ho from Slumdog Millionaire.
2008	"Marhaba Mustapha"	More Islamic Sufi song composed and performed by A. R. Rahman for the film Al Risalah.
2007	"One Love"	More Song composed by A. R. Rahman, performed by A. R. Rahman, Karthik, Naresh Iyer and penned by Raqeeb Aalam in six different languages, Hindi, Tamil, Malayalam, Telugu, Kannada and Bengali. It was made to commemorate the beauty of Taj Mahal and celebrate its status as one of the Seven Wonders of the World. Track list: 1. Ek Mohabbat; 2. Kaadal Ondrallava; 3. Pranayam Onnu Allo; 4. Prema Okkatega; 5. Premavu Illi Onde; 6. Bhalobasha Ek Hoye
2007	"Pray for Me Brother"	More English pop song composed and performed by A. R. Rahman, featuring Blaaze. The song was conceived as an anti-poverty anthem for the Millennium Goals for the United Nations. It is part of a joint venture between the A. R. Rahman Foundation and Nokia.
2005	"We Can Make It Better"	More Song composed by A. R. Rahman from the album Donasian and featuring Shaan, Jaspinder Narula, Sukhwinder Singh, Hans Raj Hans, Am'nico, Apache Indian, Palvinder Dhami, Channi Singh, Djinn Mistri, E=MC, Sumeet, Shahin Badar, Surinder Sandhu and Shahbaz Khan. It was composed as part of aiding the Tsunami victims of Asia. Track list: 1. We Can Make It Better – Shaan, Jaspinder Narula, Sukhwinder Singh, Hans Raj Hans, Am'nico, Apache Indian, Palvinder Dhami, Channi Singh, Djinn Mistri, E=MC, Sumeet, Shahin Badar, Surinder Sandhu, Shahbaz Khan; 2. Tsunami Theme – Instrumental
2002	"Ek Rahen Ek Nazaria"	More A. R. Rahman set to tune, a song based on a poem written by Dr. APJ Abdul Kalam, Song of Youth from his book, Ignited Minds. The song was performed on the occasion of Children's Day on 14 November 2002 by a group of children.
2002	"Love's Never Easy" (with Preeya Kalidas)	More All songs composed originally for the musical Bombay Dreams. Track list: 1. Love's Never Easy – Preeya Kalidas; 2. Wedding Qawwali – Sukhwinder Singh
2002	"Shakalaka Baby" (with Preeya Kalidas)	More All songs composed originally for the musical Bombay Dreams. Track list: 1. Shakalaka Baby – Preeya Kalidas; 2. Shakalaka Baby (Shri Mix) – Preeya Kalidas; 3. Tak Dheen – Preeya Kalidas
1999	"Hey Jawan Tujhe Salaam"	More Song composed and performed by A. R. Rahman and chorus in the Kargil Benefit Evening organised by Sahara at the Jawaharlal Nehru Stadium, Delhi on 11 July 1999. The song was penned by Mehboob and shared the same tune as well as lyrics (except for the phrase Hey Jawan Tujhe Salaam) with Maa Tujhe Sallam.
1998	"Ekam Satyam"	More Song composed and performed by A. R. Rahman in the AIDS Awareness Concert organised by Mukti, a Smita Thackeray foundation in association with the UB group at the Andheri Sports Complex, Mumbai on 24 December 1998.
1996	"Oh Bosnia"	More Malay song composed by A. R. Rahman, and performed by a choir of children in the A.R.Rahman Malaysia Concert and was in aid of Bosnian war victims. This song was reused as "Ek Tu Hi Bharosa" in Pukar.

=== As featured artist ===
Year	Details	Notes
2010	"We Are the World 25 for Haiti" (with Artists for Haiti) (Charts – US:#2 UK:#50 AUS:#18 CAN:#7)	More A. R. Rahman was one among the featured artists in the Artists for Haiti who recorded the song for aiding the victims of 2010 Haiti earthquake.
2010	"Phir Mile Sur Mera Tumhara"	More A. R. Rahman was one among the featured artists in Phir Mile Sur Mera Tumhara.

=== Writer ===
Year	Details	Notes
2014	"It's My Birthday" (with will.i.am and Cody Wise) (Charts – UK:#1 AUS:#4 NZ:#16)	More Based on his previous song "Urvasi Urvasi" from the 1994 film Kaadhalan.

Year	Details	Notes
1995	"Rama" (with A R Rahman and Raam Shetty) (Charts – Canada:#1 Arjun:#4 IN:#16)	More
