= Pookkalae Sattru Oyivedungal =

2014 Indian song

- Official song cover

Song by A.R. Rahman featuring Shreya Ghoshal and Haricharan

from the album I
- Released: 10 September 2014
- Genre: Filmi
- Length: 5:08
- Label: Sony Music India
- Composer: A. R. Rahman
- Lyricist: Madhan Karky
- Producer: A. R. Rahman

I track listing
- 1. "Mersalaayitten"; 2. "Ennodu Nee Irundhaal"; 3. "Ladio"; 4. "Pookkalae Sattru Oyivedungal"; 5. "Aila Aila"; 6. "Ennodu Nee Irundhaal (Reprise)"; 7. "Mersalaayitten (Remix)"

Music video
- "Pookkalae Sattru Oyivedungal" on YouTube

"Pookkalae Sattru Oyivedungal" (transl. Oh flowers... Rest a while) is a romantic Tamil song from the 2015 Tamil film, I. Composed by A. R. Rahman, the song is set in Bilahari Ragam and is sung by Shreya Ghoshal and Haricharan, with lyrics penned by Madhan Karky. The music video of the track features actors Vikram and Amy Jackson. The song was re-dubbed in two other languages. The Hindi version of the song "Tu Chale", sung by Arijit Singh and Ghoshal is written by Irshad Kamil while the Telugu version of the song "Poolane Kunukeyamantaa" was sung by Haricharan and Ghoshal with lyrics penned by Ananta Sriram. The music video of the song was shot in several locations of China.

Original version of the song was released on 10 September 2014, while the Hindi version of the song was released on 26 December 2014 and the Telugu version on 30 December 2014. Upon its release, "Pookkalae Sattru Oyivedungal" was met with positive reviews from critics; most of the critics praising the vocals by Haricharan and Ghoshal and its "simple yet beautiful" composition by Rahman.

== Background ==
The song is composed by A. R. Rahman, which marks the tenth time Rahman collaborated with the director of the song and film, Shankar. The song is sung by Haricharan and Shreya Ghoshal while the lyrics is penned by Madhan Karky. The song was released in two other languages. The Hindi version of the song titled "Tu Chale" was rendered by Arijit Singh and Ghoshal while the lyrics for the version is penned by Irshad Kamil. The Telugu version of the song "Poolane Kunukeyamantaa" was sung by Haricharan and Ghoshal and the lyrics for the version is written by Ananta Sriram.

Scenes in the song were shot in scenic locales— Red Seabeach in Panjin and on Li river in Guilin. Shooting of the song was completed over a month. It is choreographed by Bosco-Caesar. The song is composed using instruments like Harp and Haiku with programmed beats and blues type guitar riff. The sound of dripping water is added into the guitar-led arrangement of the song.

== Release ==
The song was released on 10 September 2014, and was available for digital download and on music-streaming platforms at the same day of release. The musical promo video of the song was released on 8 October 2014, and the full video of the song unveiled on 24 January 2015. The Hindi version of the song was released on 26 December 2014, while the Telugu version of was released on 30 December 2014.

Singer Haricharan, performed the song live at the grand music launch event of the album held at Nehru Indoor Stadium in Chennai on 12 September 2014, where other tracks of the album released at the event.

== Critical reception ==
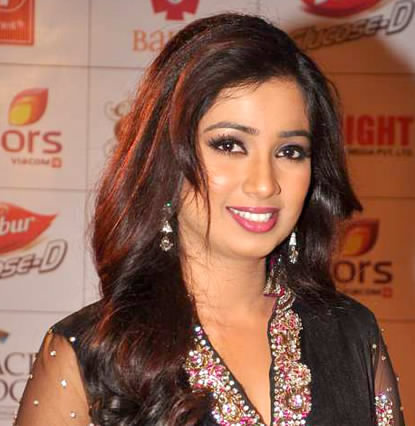
The Tamil, Hindi and Telugu version of the song is sung by Shreya Ghoshal.

Reviewers from Sify called the song "The album's melody quotient". He praised the lyrics by Madhan Karky and vocals by the lead singers: "The way Shreya Ghoshal's humming has been used in the first interlude laced with classical improvisations is top-notch". Behindwoods Review Board commented: "Haricharan's crystal clear voice, Shreya's Hindustani driven singing lead to a chart-buster, here".

== Telugu and Hindi versions ==
=== Background ===
Arijit Singh replaced Haricharan in the Hindi version of the song, titled "Tu Chale" while the female vocalist, Shreya Ghoshal was retained in the version along with the Telugu version of the song. The song marks the second collaboration of Singh with composer A. R. Rahman, the first where Singh dubbed for Hindi version of "Medhuvaagathaan", titled "Dil Chaspiya" from Kochadaiiyaan (2014). Ghoshal and Rahman had earlier worked during the year, in the film Kochadaiiyaan where she rendered the song "Mera Gham" which is the Hindi version of the Tamil song "Idhayam", originally sung by Chinmayee. She also worked with Rahman in the song "Kismat Se" from his studio album Raunaq, released in 2014.

=== Release ===
The song was released as a single on 26 December 2014. The music rights of the Hindi version of the album were acquired by T-Series. The full audio song was uploaded to YouTube account of T-Series, within the day of release. The dubbed Hindi version of the music video was released officially on 10 January 2015. The full song video released on 28 February 2015.

=== Views ===
As of 22 February 2019, the song has 16,025,144 views.

== Track listing ==
- Digital download
1. "Pookkalae Sattru Oyivedungal" – 5:08
2. "Tu Chale" – 5:08
3. "Poolane Kunukeyamantaa" – 5:06

== Release history ==
Song	Country	Date	Format	Label	Ref
"Pookkalae Sattru Oyivedungal"	India	10 September 2014	Digital download	Sony Music India	
"Pookkalae Sattru Oyivedungal"	India	24 September 2014	iTunes	Sony Music India	
"Pookkalae Sattru Oyivedungal"	United States	5 November 2014	CD single	Sony Music Entertainment	
"Pookkalae Sattru Oyivedungal"	United Kingdom	5 November 2014	CD single	Sony Music Entertainment	
"Pookkalae Sattru Oyivedungal"	Germany	5 November 2014	CD single	Sony Music Entertainment	
"Pookkalae Sattru Oyivedungal"	France	5 November 2014	CD single	Sony Music Entertainment	
"Tu Chale"	India	26 December 2014	Digital download	Super Cassettes Industries	
"Poolane Kunukeyamantaa"	India	30 December 2014	Digital download	Sony Music India	
