= Bombay (soundtrack) =

Soundtrack album by A. R. Rahman
- Released: 24 December 1994
- Recorded: Panchathan Record Inn
- Genres: Film score; Filmi; Indian classical; Qawwali; Sufi; World
- Length: 40:50
- Labels: Pyramid; PolyGram
- Producer: A.R. Rahman

A. R. Rahman chronology
| Gangmaster (1994) | Bombay (1994) | Indira (1995) |

Bombay is the soundtrack to the 1995 Indian film of the same name, with eight tracks composed by A. R. Rahman. The film was directed by Mani Ratnam, and stars Arvind Swamy and Manisha Koirala, while the soundtrack album was released on 24 December 1994 by Pyramid. The Indian film was originally a Tamil film dubbed into Hindi, Telugu and Malayalam. The soundtrack was thus released in multiple languages. The lyrics for the Tamil version were written by Vairamuthu, except for the songs, Humma Humma & Halla Gulla, which was written by Vaali. The lyrics for the Hindi and Telugu versions were written by Mehboob and Veturi, respectively.

The soundtrack of the film became one of the best-selling Indian music albums of all time, with sales of 15 million units. The soundtrack was included in The Guardian's "1000 Albums to Hear Before You Die" list, and the Hindi version of the song "Kannalane", titled "Kehna Hi Kya" by K S Chitra was included in their "1000 Songs Everyone Must Hear" list. The song "Hamma" was later reused in Ok Jaanu (2017) as "The Humma Song". "Bombay Theme" has appeared in various international films and music compilations, while "Kannalanae" and "Bombay Theme" have been sampled by various international artists.

== Release ==
The soundtrack album was originally released in Tamil in December 1994. Soon after the original released, in 1995 it was also released in Hindi and in Telugu by Polygram MIL.

== Critical reception ==
Since its release, the soundtrack for Bombay has been influential, both nationally and internationally. The soundtrack also found success across India in its dubbed Hindi and Telugu versions. In 2007, the soundtrack was included in The Guardian's "1000 Albums to Hear Before You Die" list, and the Hindi version of the song "Kannalane", titled "Kehna Hi Kya", was included in their "1000 Songs Everyone Must Hear" list in 2009. In 2014, BBC Music listed Bombay among their "20 Greatest Soundtracks" of all time, and selected the instrumental "Bombay Theme" as its standout track.

A. R. Rahman won the Filmfare Best Music Director Award (Tamil) for the soundtrack. Vairamuthu won the Tamil Nadu State Film Award for Best Lyricist, and K. S. Chithra won the Tamil Nadu State Film Award for Best Female Playback for the song "Kannalane".

== Songs ==
=== Kannalane ===
"Kannalane" is based on Qawwali, a form of Islamic Sufi music. K. S. Chithra won the Tamil Nadu State Film Award for Best Female Playback for the song "Kannalane". Backing vocals were sung by A. R. Rahman, Sujatha Mohan, Ganga and Reshmi.

"Kehna Hi Kya", like the other songs on the Hindi soundtrack, was written by Urdu lyricist Mehboob. "Kehna Hi Kya" was included in The Guardian's list of "1000 Songs Everyone Must Hear". The Hindi version of the song was also sampled by Ciara for her 2009 song "Turntables", featuring Chris Brown.

=== Bombay Theme ===
"Bombay Theme"
"Bombay Theme" (1995), composed by A. R. Rahman.

The track "Bombay Theme" is an instrumental orchestral piece composed and arranged by A. R. Rahman. It has been sampled by many artists in the world. The track featured in various compilations and films besides being sampled by many major artists. Major compilation albums on which it appeared include Chakra Seven Centers (1995; in which it was credited as "Ajna Chakra"), Anokha - Soundz of the Asian Underground (1997), Café del Mar Vol 5 (1998), Ambient Chillout Mix Vol. 1 (2002) and Paradisiac 2 . The track is alternatively credited as "Bombay Theme Tune," "Mumbai Theme Tune" or "Bombay Theme Music" in compilations. It was featured in the Italian film Denti by Gabriele Salvatores in 2000, in the Palestinian film Divine Intervention in 2002, in the 2005 Hollywood film Lord of War, and in Julian Schnabel's Miral (2010). Rahman reused the track as "Bombay Theme Intro" in the score of the 1996 film, Fire, by Deepa Mehta. It also appeared on a French TV commercial for Volvic starring Zinedine Zidane in 2000. Theme is inbedded in the Song "Still Nr. 1" by Artist Neophyte. The theme was also sampled by the German band Löwenherz for their song "Bis in die Ewigkeit", and by the American rapper Lloyd Banks for his song "Rather By Me" (2009).

=== Humma ===
Composer A R Rahman experimented with adding rap style music into Indian cinema with Humma Humma. officially known as "Antha Arabic Kadaloram" (transl. On that Arabian seaside). It sung by Rahman, Remo Fernandes and Swarnalatha.

Tanishk Bagchi and Badshah composed a remake version of the song for the remake of O Kadhal Kanmani, Ok Jaanu (2017), and Badshah added his rap to the song. Although the song was well received, Remo Fernandes, the singer of the original, critised it for adding nothing new.

=== Uyire ===
The track "Uyire" was among the most popular and acclaimed songs of the 1990s. It was sung by Hariharan, who believes it is the best one he has ever sung. After composing the song, Rahman had three choices for the vocalist - S. P. Balasubrahmanyam, K. J. Yesudas and Hariharan. Rahman says: "I had three options for that song. SPB sir, Yesudas sir, Hariharan. Then I imagined all of them singing it. Since I had not heard Hari in a non-ghazal kind of song, I decided to take the gamble. Then when he did, he had a whole new flavour for the song." The song also incorporates elements of Sufi music.

The female vocals have been provided by K. S. Chithra for Tamil and Telugu, and the Hindi version was sung by Kavita Krishnamurthy. The song was called "Tu Hi Re" in Hindi while it was called "Urike Chilaka" in Telugu. The Hindi version was first sung by K.S.Chithra but music company wanted Hindi singer to sing henceforth it was sung by Kavita Krishnamurthy. The background voice was by Hariharan & Sunandha

The song was shot at Bekal Fort in Kerala.

== Track listing ==
The Tamil track "Andha Arabic Kadaloram" had two different versions. The original release contained only A. R. Rahman's version; whereas the re-released version contained the rap portions by Remo Fernandes which were recorded for the Hindi dubbed version.

All music is composed by A. R. Rahman.

Tamil
| No. | Title | Lyrics | Singer(s) | Length |
|---|---|---|---|---|
| 1. | "Antha Arabic Kadaloram (Humma Humma)" | Vaali | A. R. Rahman, Swarnalatha, Suresh Peters | 5:11 |
| 2. | "Kannalanae" | Vairamuthu | K. S. Chithra, A. R. Rahman, chorus (Sujatha Mohan, Reshmi, Ganga) | 5:48 |
| 3. | "Uyire Uyire (Raga Charukeshi)" | Vairamuthu | Hariharan, K. S. Chithra, Sunanda (humming) | 7:14 |
| 4. | "Kuchi Kuchi Rakamma" | Vairamuthu | Hariharan, Swarnalatha, G. V. Prakash Kumar, Bombay Saradha, Shweta Mohan | 5:01 |
| 5. | "Poovukkenna Poottu (Halla Gulla)" | Vaali | S. P. Pallavi, Noel James, Anupama, Malgudi Subha, Srinivas | 5:55 |
| 6. | "Bombay Theme" | | Instrumental | 5:17 |
| 7. | "Malarodu Malaringu" | Vairamuthu | Sujatha Mohan, Anuradha Sriram, chorus | 2:43 |
| 8. | "Idhu Annai Bhoomi" | Vairamuthu | Sujatha Mohan, Noel James, Srinivas, Sivanesan, Ganga Sitharasu, Renuka, Anuradha Sriram | 3:28 |
| 9. | "Antha Arabic Kadaloram (Hamma Hamma)" (Rap Vocals by Remo Fernandes) | Vaali | A. R. Rahman, Swarnalatha, Remo Fernandes, Suresh Peters | 5:11 |

All lyrics are written by Mehboob; all music is composed by A. R. Rahman.

Hindi (including Urdu)
| No. | Title | Singer(s) | Length |
|---|---|---|---|
| 1. | "Hamma Hamma" | Remo Fernandes, A. R. Rahman, Suresh Peters & Swarnalatha | 5:10 |
| 2. | "Kehna Hi Kya" | K. S. Chithra, A. R. Rahman, chorus (Sujatha Mohan, Reshmi, Ganga) | 5:48 |
| 3. | "Tu Hi Re (Raga Charukeshi)" | Hariharan, Kavita Krishnamurthy, Sunandha (humming) | 7:14 |
| 4. | "Kuchi Kuchi Rakkamma" | Udit Narayan, Kavita Krishnamurthy, G. V. Prakash Kumar, Sharadha | 5:01 |
| 5. | "Kuch Bhi Na Socho" | Pallavi, Shubha, Anupama, Noel James, Srinivas | 5:55 |
| 6. | "Bombay Theme" | Instrumental | 5:18 |
| 7. | "Aankhon Mein Ummeedon" | Sujatha Mohan, Chorus | 2:43 |
| 8. | "Apna Zameen Yeh" | Sujatha Mohan, Noel James, Srinivas, Sivanesan, Ganga Sreenivasan, Renuka, Anuradha Sriram | 3:28 |

All lyrics are written by Veturi; all music is composed by A. R. Rahman.

Telugu
| No. | Title | Singer(s) | Length |
|---|---|---|---|
| 1. | "Adi Arabi Kadalandam" | Remo Fernandes, Suresh Peters, A. R. Rahman, Swarnalatha | 5:10 |
| 2. | "Kannanule" | K. S. Chithra, A. R. Rahman, chorus (Sujatha Mohan, Reshmi, Ganga) | 5:48 |
| 3. | "Urike Chilaka" | Hariharan, K. S. Chithra | 7:14 |
| 4. | "Kuchi Kuchi Koonamma" | Hariharan, Swarnalatha, G. V. Prakash Kumar, Sharadha | 5:01 |
| 5. | "Poolakundi Komma" | Pallavi, Shubha, Anupama, Noel James, Srinivas | 5:55 |
| 6. | "Kulamela Mathamela" | Sujatha Mohan, chorus | 2:43 |
| 7. | "Bombay Theme" | Instrumental | 5:18 |
| 8. | "Idhu Maathrubhoomi" | K.S.Chithra, Shankar Mahadevan, Sujatha Mohan, Noel James, Srinivas, Sivanesan, Ganga Sreenivasan, Renuka, Anuradha Sriram | 3:28 |
