= I (soundtrack) =

- Soundtrack cover art

Soundtrack album by A. R. Rahman
- Released: 6 September 2014
- Recorded: 2012–2014
- Studios: Panchathan Record Inn and AM Studios, Chennai; Panchathan Hollywood Studios, Los Angeles
- Length: 33:56
- Language: Tamil
- Label: Sony Music India
- Producer: A. R. Rahman

A. R. Rahman chronology
Kaaviya Thalaivan (2014)	I (2014)	Lingaa (2015)

Singles from I
- 1. "Pookkalae Sattru Oyivedungal" Released: 10 September 2014

I is the soundtrack album to the 2015 Indian romantic thriller film of the same name written and directed by S. Shankar. A. R. Rahman composed the original songs and background score for the film. The album consists of seven tracks, which include a remix and a reprise. Songs in the film vary in genre like EDM, bhangra, opera, urban. The original version of the soundtrack has youth oriented voices. The original version of the album was released on 6 September 2014. The audio was launched at a grand function at the Jawaharlal Nehru Indoor Stadium, Chennai on 12 September 2014, with Arnold Schwarzenegger as the chief guest.

The soundtrack as well as the score received a very positive critical reception and it was declared one of the top twenty best selling albums of 2014 by iTunes India. At the 2016 Filmfare Awards, A. R. Rahman won the Filmfare Award for Best Music Director whereas lyricist Madhan Karky won Filmfare Award for Best Lyricist for his lyrics to the song "Pookkalae Sattru Oyivedungal". Shreya Ghoshal was nominated for the same track under Filmfare Award for Best Female Playback Singer. Lyricist Kabilan was nominated for Filmfare Award for Best Lyricist for the track "Ennodu Nee Irundhaal". However, Sid Sriram won the Filmfare Award for Best Male Playback Singer for the song.

== Development ==
A. R. Rahman was selected to compose the original songs and background score for the film. In early July 2012, singer Vijay Prakash recorded the track "Pareshanayya" (Telugu version of "Mersalayitten"). In January 2013, the song "Aila Aila" was recorded. Karky called it as the "most challenging song" he had ever worked on. As some part of the film's story is about modeling, his team created a compilation of six-seven commercials that play to this song. According to Karky, "The lyrics of Aila Aila was the most difficult to pen as each line will have two different meanings, one is what you hear and one is what you are going to watch on the screen". The five and a half minute track blends genres like pop, bhangra, opéra comique elements and electronic beats. In an interview with The Hindu, S. Shankar stated that he wanted unusual music for I with extensive experimentation. He called the experimentation most evident in this track especially the operatic part. The song slightly touches underlying feeling of romance. Portions of the track "Ennodu Nee Irundhaal" sung only by Sunitha Sarathy were recorded on 14 February 2013. Rahman was supposed to have sung "Ennodu Nee Irundhaal" but chose Sid Sriram because the latter sang it well and Rahman felt that Sriram didn't earn the deserving recognition through track "Adiye" from Kadal, thus gave a second opportunity. Lyricist Madhan Karky's third song in the film was recorded by mid – September 2013. In May 2014, Rahman through Reddit stated that the film songs have more youth-oriented voices. The track "Mersalaayiten" was recorded by Anirudh Ravichander and Neeti Mohan in the span of July – August 2014. On 4 July 2014, the recording of all the songs for both the versions – the original Tamil version and the dubbed Telugu version were completed. Pravin Mani was involved in post-production of the album for two months. He was recruited for the work of recording ancillaries and corrections. Madhan Karky explained the meanings of the Tamil words he had used in the song "Ladio" on his Twitter page.

== Release ==
On 24 March 2014, Sony Music India acquired the audio rights of the film. The official soundtrack album cover of the film was released on 6 September 2014. The audio launch was planned for a release in Canada, but the film's producer, V. Ravichandran, asserted that the music of the Tamil version would be released at a grand event at the Nehru Indoor Stadium in Chennai on 13 September 2014. On 1 September 2014, Arnold Schwarzenegger confirmed himself as an invitee at the forthcoming event; also Kannada actor and singer Puneeth Rajkumar and Telugu actor Rana Daggubati was as chief guests. Ravichandran said Rahman would present the songs in a fashion similar to a live music concert.

International bubble artist Ana Yang, wife of the 16-time Guinness World Record holder, Fan Yang, performed as part of the event. Weta Workshop artists who have worked on the film would provided the makeup for the background dancers, who delivered the performances wearing the actual costumes from the respective songs. A fashion show by the film's costume designer took place. A rough cut version of the song "Merasalaayiten" leaked onto the internet a day prior to the music launch.

Bobby Simha and singer Chinmayi hosted the audio launch. Anirudh Ravichander, Karthik, Keba Jeremiah, Neeti Mohan, Haricharan, Natalie Di Luccio, A. R. Rahman, Amy Jackson and Vikram were part of the stage performances. The team from Weta Workshop was introduced after the song "Ennodu Nee Irundhaal" was performed. In addition to the songs from the soundtrack album, Rahman also performed a few tracks from his previous compositions, which were "Oorvasi Oorvasi", "Chikku Bukku Rayile", "Ottagathai Kattiko", "Muqabala", "Petta Rap", "Maya Machindra", "Shakalaka Baby", "Girlfriend", "Colombus Columbus", "Athiradi Kaalam" and "Irumbile Oru Irudhaiyam". The audio launch event was telecasted on Jaya TV on 3 October 2014, coinciding with Vijayadasami celebrations.

== Critical reception ==
=== Songs ===
The album received very positive reviews upon release. Critic Baradwaj Rangan for The Hindu called the soundtrack "wholly individual" that liberates A. R. Rahman. He felt, "The soundtrack that sets Rahman apart. At his most playful, he's capable of synthesising sound and tunesmanship to produce music that's the equivalent of a modern-art mural. You may not want it on your wall, but this isn't about wanting it on your wall." Sify said, "Despite the fact it is not among Isaipuyal's greater works, 'I' still has 2-3 numbers that are bound to get stuck in our playlists. The simpler tunes like "Ennodu Nee Irundhaal" and "Pookale Satru Oyvedungal" are here to stay while the peppy "Mersalaayiten" and the Shankar-esque "Aila Aila" are bound to get enriched by the visuals." and rated the album 3.5 out of 5. Behindwoods chose "Merasalaayiten", "Pookkalae Sattru Oyivedungal" and the track "Ennodu Nee Irudhaal" as well as its reprise as the album's picks and gave a rating of 3.5 out of 5, concluding that "Rahman & Shankar are back to doing what they do best, churn out chart busters !" Vipin of Music Aloud stated, "Three winning songs in a half-and-half soundtrack from A R Rahman. Still would rate in the lower half of the ARR-Shankar repertory". However, he called "Pookkalae Sattru Oyivedungal" as "the best of the soundtrack, a charming melody", and gave the album a rating of 8 out of 10.

=== Background score ===
Writing the critical reception for Firstpost, Latha Srinivasan stated, "Shankar has done justice to A.R. Rahman's tunes and that's a visual treat in the film." Rachel Saltz of The New York Times wrote called it a score that 'engage ones senses', further noting, "I could easily be a silent movie—though a noisy one, with a boom-boom score by A.R. Rahman that signals at each turn how the audience should feel, and with flurries of drums, speeds the film along." Gulte called, Rahman's music 'average', comparing it its standards to his previous works done for Shankar's films. Nandini Ramnath at Scroll writes that the film has, "AR Rahman's least memorable scores with background music set at the level that reads 'This has the potential of damaging eardrums.'" An IANS review mentions, "A.R. Rahman's score to the film doesn't make much of a difference but for remaining mostly soothing and melodic." Subramanian Harikumar of Bollywood Life stated, "The songs, composed by Rahman, are brilliant, especially Tum Todo Na (Ennodu Nee Irunthaal) song will leave you mesmerised. A great background score from AR Rahman." Suhani Singh for India Today writes, "Music by A.R. Rahman is top class! He has obviously given his best to match up to Shankar's vision." R. Vishal at United Internet wrote, "The songs fail to allure the viewer in the way Shankar's previous movies have." For Bangalore Mirror, R. S. Prakash stated, "A R Rahman has been the composer of all of Shankar's directorial ventures, but here Rahman seems to have been in a hurry to wrap up as none of the songs are effective." Surabhi Redkar for Koimoi writes, "A R Rahman's music too does not turn out endearing and overall during the songs." Writing for Mumbai Mirror, Rahul Desai praised the score in film, calling it 'throbbing hours of an operatic musical'. Critic based at Bollywood Hungama felt, "The film suffers in the music department (A. R. Rahman), wherein the songs seem to be thrusted into the film's situation."

== Track listing ==
=== Tamil ===
The official track listing of the original version was released by Sony Music South on 10 September 2014.

Label: Sony Music India
No.	Title	Lyrics	Singer(s)	Length
1.	"Mersalaayitten"	Kabilan	Anirudh Ravichander, Neeti Mohan	5:00
2.	"Ennodu Nee Irundhaal"	Kabilan	Sid Sriram, Sunitha Sarathy	5:52
3.	"Ladio"	Madhan Karky	Nikhita Gandhi	4:42
4.	"Pookkalae Sattru Oyivedungal"	Madhan Karky	Haricharan, Shreya Ghoshal	5:08
5.	"Aila Aila"	Madhan Karky	Aditya Rao, Natalie Di Luccio	5:34
6.	"Ennodu Nee Irundhaal" (Reprise)	Kabilan	Chinmayi, Sid Sriram	4:12
7.	"Mersalaayiten" (Remix)	Kabilan	Anirudh Ravichander, Neeti Mohan	3:20
Total length:				33:56

=== Hindi ===
All lyrics are written by Irshad Kamil.

Label: T-Series
No.	Title	Singer(s)	Length
1.	"Issak Taari"	Nakash Aziz, Neeti Mohan	5:01
2.	"Tum Todo Naa (Male version)"	Ash King, Sunidhi Chauhan	5:49
3.	"Lady O"	Nikhita Gandhi	4:38
4.	"Tu Chale"	Arijit Singh, Shreya Ghoshal	5:08
5.	"Aiyla"	Shiraz Uppal, Natalie Di Luccio	5:32
6.	"Tum Todo Naa (Female version)"	Ash King, Bela Shende	4:12
7.	"Issak Taari (Remix)"	Nakash Aziz, Neeti Mohan	3:24

=== Telugu ===
Label: Sony Music India
No.	Title	Lyrics	Singer(s)	Length
1.	"Pareshanayya"	Suddala Ashok Teja	Vijay Prakash, Neeti Mohan	5:01
2.	"Nuvvunte Naa Jathagaa"	Ramajogayya Sastry	Sid Sriram, Issrath Quadhri	5:50
3.	"Ladiyo"	Anantha Sreeram	Nikhita Gandhi	4:41
4.	"Poolane Kunukeyamantaa"	Anantha Sreeram	Haricharan, Shreya Ghoshal	5:06
5.	"Ayila Ayila"	Chandrabose	Haricharan, Natalie Di Luccio	5:34
6.	"Nuvvunte Naa Jathagaa" (Reprise)	Ramajogayya Sastry	Sid Sriram, Issrath Quadhri	4:13
7.	"Pareshanayya" (Remix)	Suddala Ashok Teja	Vijay Prakash, Neeti Mohan	3:20

== Release history ==
Album	Country	Date	Format	Label	Ref
I (Original)	Worldwide (All music streaming platforms)	12 September 2014	Digital download	Sony Music India	
I (Original)	Worldwide (iTunes)	24 September 2014	Digital download	Sony Music India	
I (Original)	India	31 October 2014	CD	Sony Music Entertainment	
I (Original)	United States	5 November 2014	CD	Sony Music Entertainment	
I (Original)	United Kingdom	5 November 2014	CD	Sony Music Entertainment	
I (Original)	Germany	26 November 2014	CD	Sony Music Entertainment	
I (Original)	France	26 November 2014	CD	Sony Music Entertainment	
I (Hindi)	India	31 December 2014	Digital download	T-Series	
I -Manoharudu (Telugu)	India	31 December 2014	Digital download	Sony Music Entertainment	

== Album credits ==
Backing Vocals

Nivas, Santhosh Narayanan, Deepak, Arjun Chandrasekar, Pooja A. V., Aanchal Singh, Maria Roe Vincent

K.M.M.C. Choir conducted by Neuman Pinto for the song "Ennodu Nee Irundhal"

Personnel

- Guitars: Keba Jeremiah
- Bass: Keith Peters, Keba Jeremiah
- Violin: Ganesh
- Indian Rhythm: T. Raja, Kumar, Neelakandan, Raju, Laxminarayan, Vedachalam

Production

- Producer: A. R. Rahman
- Mastering: S. Sivakumar
- Chennai Strings Orchestra: V. J. Srinivasamurthy (at AM Studios, Chennai)
- Engineers:
  - Suresh Permal, Srinidhi Venkatesh, Vinay S. Hariharan (at Panchathan Record Inn, Chennai)
  - Tony Joy, Kevin Doucette (at Panchathan Hollywood, LA)
  - S. Sivakumar, Kannan Ganpat, Karthik Sekaran, Anantha Krishnan, Pradeep (at AM Studios, Chennai)
- Vocal supervision: Srinivas, Srinidhi Venkatesh
- Mixing: Kevin Doucette, Suresh Permal | P. A. Deepak & Ishaan Chhabra for the song "Merasalaayiten (Remix)"
- Additional programming: Ranjit Barot, Pravin Mani, T. R. Krishana Chetan, Marc, Hentry Kuruvilla | Soumya Sejpal for the song "Ladio"
- Music co-ordinators: Noell James, Vijay Mohan Iyer
- Musicians' fixer: R. Samidurai
