= Tamasha (soundtrack) =

Soundtrack album by A. R. Rahman
- Released: 16 October 2015
- Recorded: 2014–15; Panchathan Record Inn and AM Studios, Chennai; A. R. Studios, Mumbai; K.M.M.C. Studios, Chennai
- Genre: Filmi
- Length: 46:00
- Language: Hindi
- Label: T-Series
- Producer: A. R. Rahman

A. R. Rahman chronology
O Kadhal Kanmani (2015)	Tamasha (soundtrack) (2015)	Muhammad: The Messenger of God (2015)

Singles from Tamasha
- 1. "Matargashti" Released: 9 October 2015.

Tamasha is the soundtrack album, composed by A. R. Rahman with song lyrics by Irshad Kamil, to the 2015 Hindi film of the same name, directed by Imtiaz Ali and produced by Sajid Nadiadwala. The film stars Ranbir Kapoor and Deepika Padukone in lead roles. The album features nine tracks, and was released on 16 October 2015 by T-Series. The songs cover genres like European dance, bhangra, opera, Hindustani classical and dubstep apart from experimental fusion of genres.

Upon release, music critics not only praised the trio–director, composer and lyricist for coming up with classy, catchy and commercial numbers but also censured the soundtrack album, calling the treatment to the album as irreverent and hangover of previous works Highway and Rockstar. The track "Matargashti" was released as the first single prior to the soundtrack album release. The tracks "Matargashti" and "Tum Saath Ho" were the chart toppers on the Indian Music Charts.

The soundtrack was adjudged as one of the best albums of 2015, wherein A. R. Rahman and Alka Yagnik were nominated under Filmfare Award for Best Music Director and Filmfare Award for Best Female Playback Singer, respectively. However, lyricist Irshad Kamil won the Filmfare Award for Best Lyricist.

== Development ==
Prior to his 2014 release Highway, A. R. Rahman agreed to work with Imtiaz Ali to compose for Tamasha. In an interview with Business Standard, Imtiaz Ali said that the music in the film has been used as a narrative to enhance the inherent drama of the situation without dialogue. Songs in the film were almost in the form of impresarios. According to the lyricist Irshad Kamil, the lyrical work present human emotions in such different flavours. It is the title of the film that was the first brief given to compose the music. Imtiaz Ali was inspired by Shakespeare's words full of sound and fury and All the World's A Stage. The film has performance oriented music and with the traditional, old-fashioned traditional Indian, contemporary form in the city that is westernized and so is the music.

The sounds in the song "Matargashti" and the instrumental track "Parade De La Bastille" are inspired by European Dance Music genre when the music parade is travelling to Corsica. For the track "Matargashti", Rahman wanted Mohit Chauhan to sing at a higher pitch when compared to his singing for the former's Rockstar. The song "Heer Toh Badi Sad Hain" belongs to the bhangra genre. This track was written in the same melodic meter compared to its original, titled "Heer". The track required least time to record. On opting for Alka Yagnik, Rahman spoke that she had recorded previously the score of The Hundred-Foot Journey and her voice would be suitable for the track "Tum Saath Ho". The song "Chali Kahani" is operatic and the lyrical work depicts mythological character Ravana's cry. It took six months for Rahman to mix the track. The track "Safarnama" is a spiritual journey song with minimal music arrangements. Initially, "Safarnama" was composed using more instruments, however, they were removed. On the same lines, the track "Tu Koi Aur Hai" is also a journey song but incorporates few musical instruments. To add another layer and texture to the song, Rahman made singer Arjun Chandy sing a bit of opera. The song combines various musical elements. A couple of songs in the film are narrative in nature that do not depict the actual moods of the characters, one such track is "Heer Toh Badi Sad Hai".

The record label T-Series had acquired the music rights in September 2014. In mid-September 2015, the soundtrack was mixed.

== Critical response ==
=== Songs ===
Joginder Tuteja who penned the critical review for Bollywood Hungama summarized, "The soundtrack of Tamasha delivers more than what on expected from it and is a good mix of classy and massy score. There are a few instantly catchy numbers as well which ensure that commercially too." He assigned a score of 4 out of 5 to the album. However, critic Kasmin Fernandes in her review for The Times of India, called the album 'purely experimental' The soundtrack album was awarded 4 stars (out of 5). In his critical review for The New Indian Express, Vipin Nair awards the album a score of 8.5 out of 10. He called the album a "winner", concluding, "The occasional hiccups aside, that’s three winners in a row for A. R. Rahman – Irshad Kamil – Imtiaz Ali." Critic Aelina Kapoor of Rediff, writes, "It has been a while since AR Rahman had delivered a popular score for a Hindi film. She gave 3.5 stars out of 5 to the album. Suanshu Khurana of The Indian Express gave the album 3.5 stars out of 5. The critic summarised, "Tamasha comes with some exhilarating layers. It falters sometimes, picks itself up to hit some high points, stays in the middle of the pack, and then suddenly wows you with its catchy hooks." For BBC India, critic Rohit Mehrotra writes, "Tamasha is filled with situational songs. The presentation of the album is grand, however, melodies were deprived." However, he assigned three stars out of five to the album.

Contrary to the positive reviews, writing for India West, critical review of R. M. Vijayakar noted, "A.R. Rahman’s scores for Imtiaz Ali (this is the third) show a clear irreverence to conventional meters and melodies — ditto Irshad Kamil’s lyrics. This results in substance here and there, but, in most cases, it is about being stylized, contemporary and thus irreverent, and not necessarily quality- or even appeal-oriented." In his review for The Hindu, critic Sankhayan Ghosh stated: "Tamasha is not as big an album as Rockstar and Highway. Tamasha comes with the gargantuan baggage of the early two films."

=== Original score ===
Critic based at Bollywood Hungama stated, "Despite A.R. Rahman at the helm of things, the music (sadly) does not help in lifting the proceedings. At the same time, one cannot ignore the melodious track in the film in the form of "Matargashti" that stays fresh in the minds of the viewers." Surabhi Redkar of Koimoi pointed out, "A. R Rahman’s music compliments extremely well for the film and of course the song placement is quite apt." In her review for The Hindu, critic Namrata Joshi said: "The music doesn’t rise to the occasion." Rachit Gupta of Filmfare mentioned, "The Mohit Chauhan and AR Rahman combination of music seems like a leftover from Rockstar" Satya Kandala of The Economic Times stated: "One of the two heroes of the film is the music (both tracks and background score) composed by A R Rahman." Critic Mehul of Deccan Chronicle stated, "A.R. Rahman’s music again stands out and all the songs are melodious and fit the situation. The songs play a crucial role in the film, which takes the story ahead, never once interfering with the storyline. " Ananya Bhattacharya of India Today wrote, "AR Rahman's music gets better the more you listen to it. Matargashti and Tum Saath Ho stand out from among this musical treat." For The Times of India, critic Priya Gupta said, ""Matargashti" and "Heer Toh Badi Sad Hai", two of Rahman's songs, are magical even as standalone numbers." Pallavi Patra of Zee News claimed, "Music by AR Rahman was soulful and touchy. The song "Tum Sath Ho" and "Tu Koi Aur Hai" are beautiful and moving."

== Track listing ==
All lyrics written by Irshad Kamil.

Tamasha (Original Motion Picture Soundtrack)
No.	Title	Singer(s)	Length
1.	"Matargashti"	Mohit Chauhan	05:28
2.	"Heer Toh Badi Sad Hai"	Mika Singh, Nakash Aziz	05:27
3.	"Safarnama"	Lucky Ali	04:11
4.	"Agar Tum Saath Ho"	Alka Yagnik, Arijit Singh	05:41
5.	"Chali Kahani"	Sukhwinder Singh, Haricharan, Haripriya	05:19
6.	"Wat Wat Wat"	Arijit Singh, Shashwat Singh	04:58
7.	"Parade De La Bastille (Instrumental version)"	A. R. Rahman	03:41
8.	"Wat Wat Wat (Vengeance Mix)"	Arijit Singh, Shashwat Singh	03:55
9.	"Tu Koi Aur Hai"	A. R. Rahman, Alma Ferovic, Arjun Chandy	07:20
Total length:			46:00

Notes

- "Tum Saath Ho" (track 4) is also referred as "Agar Tum Saath Ho" on the back of CD edition.
- The track "J'aime La Vie" written in French by Viviane Chaix and performed by Arpita Gandhi was used only in the film score.

== Music charts ==
A year end compilation by publications, The Indian Express, in its top ten singles compilation list ranked "Matargashti" on number two. They stated, "Mohit Chauhan, A. R. Rahman and Imtiaz Ali form an enviable combination right from Rockstar days. "Matargashti" was more peppy and had a mischievous ring to it. The kind of song one would love to sing while playing Antakshari." The album ranked at number three spot on the list of "Best Album of 2015" by The Hindu. Critic Kartik Srinivasan stated, "Rounding off the top three is Rahman’s Tamasha, a thematic soundtrack that so beautifully weaves through Imtiaz’s narrative." Critic Sankhayan Ghosh, also based at The Hindu specially noted the nuances of playback in the song "Matargashti", claiming: "Mohit Chauhan role-played Dev Anand mouthing a Kishore Kumar song in the last act of ‘Matargashti’ from Tamasha. He added, "Tamasha album was a rich audiovisual treat, the lyric, music and images deeply connected and realised with imagination and a madness that we now associate with Imtiaz Ali." In her view of Bollywood music in 2015, Juhi Chaturvedi of Hindustan Times called Alka Yagnik's voice "refreshing" and "yearning" in the song "Tum Saath Ho". Similarly, Bryan Durham of DNA India said: "Alka Yagnik returned to hit territory with Tamasha’s "Tum Saath Ho"." According to Scroll.in, the album was tied to the soundtrack of Bajirao Mastani on the first position, hailing both as: "The Best Bollywood Soundtrack of 2015. As on May 23, 2026, Agar Tum Saath Ho was the most-streamed Indian song on Spotify, accumulating more than 717 million streams. The remained on the platform’s "Top Songs" chart in India for 363 weeks since entering it in June 2019. The song currently records a daily stream count of 471,396

Chart (2015)	Peak position	Ref.
Indian Music Charts	1	

=== Singles ===
Chart (2015)	Song	Peak position	Ref.
Indian Music Charts	Matargashti	1	
Indian Music Charts	Tum Saath Ho	1	
Indian Music Charts	Heer To Badi Sad Hai	9	
Indian Music Charts	Safarnama	7	
Indian Music Charts	Tu Koi Aur Hai	9	
Bahrain Music Charts	Chali Kahani	21	
Bahrain Music Charts	Matargashti	35	
Bahrain Music Charts	Tum Saath Ho	22	
Music Chart of Fiji	Tum Saath Ho	13	
Qatar Music Charts	Matargashti	64	
Omani Music Charts	Matargashti	29	
Omani Music Charts	Tum Saath Ho	14	
Mauritian Music Charts	Tum Saath Ho	76	
UAE Music Charts	Tu Koi Aur Hai	57	
UAE Music Charts	Matargashti	18	
UAE Music Charts	Tum Saath Ho	24	
Radio Mirchi Top 20	Matargashti	2	
Radio Mirchi Top 20	Tum Saath Ho	4	
Radio Mirchi Top 20	Heer To Badi Sad Hai	5	
Shazam Top 100	Tum Saath Ho	3	
Shazam Top 100	Matargashti	54	
Fever 104 FM Top 10	Matargashti	—N/a	
Fever 104 FM Top 10	Heer To Badi Sad Hai	—N/a	
Fever 104 FM Top 10	Tum Saath Ho	—N/a	

== Release history ==
The soundtrack marks the first ever album by the record label T-Series to have an online streaming on Spotify.

Region	Date	Format	Reference
India	16 October 2015	Digital download	
India	1 November 2015	CD	
Australia	16 October 2015	Digital download	
Brasil	16 October 2015	Digital download	
Canada	16 October 2015	Digital download	
Denmark	16 October 2015	Digital download	
France	16 October 2015	Digital download	
Japan	16 October 2015	Digital download	
New Zealand	16 October 2015	Digital download	
United Kingdom	16 October 2015	Digital download	
United States	16 October 2015	Digital download	

== Accolades ==
Note – The lists are ordered by the date of announcement, not by the date of ceremony/telecast.

Award	Date	Category	Recipient(s) and nominee(s)	Result	Ref(s)
Stardust Awards	15 December 2015	Best Playback Singer (Male)	Mika Singh (for the song "Heer Toh Badi Sad Hai")	Nominated	
Stardust Awards	15 December 2015	Best Playback Singer (Female)	Alka Yagnik (for the song "Tum Saath Ho")	Nominated	
Guild Awards	21 December 2015	Best Music	A. R. Rahman	Nominated	
Guild Awards	21 December 2015	Best Male Singer	Mohit Chauhan (for the song "Matargashti")	Nominated	
Guild Awards	21 December 2015	Best Female Singer	Alka Yagnik (for the song "Tum Saath Ho")	Nominated	
Filmfare Awards	11 January 2016	Best Music	A. R. Rahman	Nominated	
Filmfare Awards	11 January 2016	Best Lyrics	Irshad Kamil (for the song "Tum Saath Ho")	Won	
Filmfare Awards	11 January 2016	Best Playback Singer (Female)	Alka Yagnik (for the song "Tum Saath Ho")	Nominated	
Zee Cine Awards	18 February 2016	Best Music Director	A. R. Rahman	Nominated	
Zee Cine Awards	18 February 2016	Best Lyrics	Irshad Kamil (for the song "Tum Saath Ho")	Nominated	
Zee Cine Awards	18 February 2016	Best Playback Singer – Male	Mohit Chauhan (for the song "Matargashti")	Won	
Mirchi Music Awards	1 March 2016	Listener's Choice Song of the Year	"Agar Tum Saath Ho"	Won	
Mirchi Music Awards	1 March 2016	Female Vocalist of the Year	Alka Yagnik (for the song "Tum Saath Ho")	Nominated	
Mirchi Music Awards	1 March 2016	Lyricist of the Year	Irshad Kamil (for the song "Tum Saath Ho")	Nominated	

== Album Credits ==
Credits adapted from A. R. Rahman's official website.

- Madras Musical Association Choir conducted by Arjun Chandy.
- Chennai Strings Orchestra Conducted By V. J. Srinivasamurthy

Backing vocals

Suzanne D'Mello, Samantha Edwards, Arjun Chandy, Nikhita Gandhi, Abhay Jodhpurkar, Bhavya, Nakul Abhyankar, Sashwat Singh, Parag Chhabra, Atikant Verma, Navdeep Dhatra, Pranav Joseph, Niranjana Ramanan, Sowmya M., Deepthi Suresh, Parvathy, Sharanya S., Madhumita R., Madhumita Srinivasan, S. Maalavika

Personnel

- Drums, bongos and congas – Mohammed Noor
- Uilleann pipe – Naveen Kumar (on the track "Parade De La Bastille")
- Darbuka – Kumar
- Tabla – Sai Shravanam, Neelakantan
- Dilruba – Saroja
- Guitar – Keba Jeremiah, Sunil Milner
- Charango – Keba Jeremiah
- Mandolin – Tapas Roy (on the track "Parade De La Bastille"), Cheenu, Prakash Hariharan
- Flute – Kamalakar (on the track "Parade De La Bastille"), Naveen Kumar, Kiran
- Bass – Keith Peters
- Tumbi – Ishaan Chhabra
- Accordion – Ishaan Chhabra (on the track "Parade De La Bastille")
- Violin – Prabhakar
- Shehnai – S. Ballesh
- Sitar – Kishore

Production

- Music producer – A. R. Rahman
- Engineers:
  - Suresh Permal, T. R. Krishna Chetan, Jerry Vincent, Karthik Sekaran, Vinay Sridhar Hariharan (at Panchathan Record Inn)
  - S. Sivakumar, Kannan Ganpat, Pradeep, Krishnan Subramanian (at A.M. Studios)
  - Srinidhi Venkatesh, R. Nitish Kumar, Ishaan Chhabra (at A. R. Studios, Mumbai)
  - Riyazdeen Riyan (at K.M.M.C. Studios, Chennai)
- Mastering – R. Nitish Kumar (at A.M. Studios)
- Additional mixing – Pravin Mani, Hari Dafusia (for the track "Wat Wat (Vengeance Mix)")
- Music production assistant – Ishaan Chhabra
- Vocal supervision – Nakash Aziz, Srinidhi Venkatesh
- Mixing – R Nitish Kumar
- Music supervisor – Srinidhi Venkatesh
- Additional programming – Hentry Kuruvilla, Marcmuse
- Music co-ordinator – Noell James, Vijay Iyer
- Musicians' fixer – R. Samidurai
