= Raunaq (album) =

Studio album by A. R. Rahman
- Released: 31 May 2014 (Introductory launch); 1 September 2014 (Music launch); 15 October 2014 (CD release)
- Recorded: 2013–2014
- Studios: Panchathan Record Inn and AM Studios, Chennai
- Genre: Indi pop
- Length: 37:06
- Language: Hindi
- Label: Sony Music
- Producer: A. R. Rahman

A. R. Rahman chronology
Connections (2009)	Raunaq (2014)

Raunaq: Conversation of Music and Poetry is a 2014 studio album composed by A. R. Rahman with lyrics penned by Kapil Sibal. The album is described as a conversation of music and poetry that takes one on a journey of varied emotions. Selected tracks of the album depict social scenario of India through Sibal's lyrics. The album was a result of Sibal's anthology of poems to which Rahman added visuals from Raja Ravi Varma's paintings, thus, developing songs and corresponding videos to it. A. R. Rahman has played the role of a visual storyteller and has conceived the narrative of the music video "Aa Bhi Jaa". The album was announced through an introductory video backed by the same song. The album being a visual story telling sort of, the marketing strategies developed were to have each song's individual marketing and promotional activity released over a period of time. The album had an introductory launch by Salman Khan at an event held in Mumbai on 31 May 2014. The album was released on 1 September 2014. The album was dedicated to Vogue Empower, a social awareness initiative that draws attention to women's empowerment.

== Development ==
In an interview with Mid-Day, Rahman stated that in the year 2013 he was gifted a book of Raja Ravi Varma's paintings. Influenced by those, he wished videos of the recorded songs to have visuals from paintings. Rahman met Kapil Sibal at a common friend's place who read out Sibal's poems at a function. Sibal showed Rahman the anthology of poems wherein Sibal added that how inspiration strikes him anywhere, anytime. Rahman was fascinated by the seven to eight poems from these collection of poems. Rahman began composing music for the same, around six months before March 2014. Adhering to the development, the record Sony Music agreed to back this musical production. The track "Aa Bhi Jaa" is based on a love-separation theme whereas the track "Laadli" is a tribute to all the women of the country. In the album, Rahman has played the role of a visual story teller and has conceived the narrative of the "Aabhi Jaa" music video, apart from his role as a music composer and singer. In April 2014, director Bejoy Nambiar with cameraman Sanu Varghese were involved in filming of the song "Laadli". On recording the track, Rahman stated that when he heard the lyrics of "Laadli" for the first time, he felt that Lata Mangeshkar would be the right voice for it. The singer heard the song and agreed to do it but not the same day as she was keeping unwell. At that time, Rahman had come to India for a day just to record that particular track and had to fly back immediately to continue recording film score of an international flick. Post three-and-half later, Rahman met singer Lata Mangeshkar and told that if now she'd disagree to recording the track then he won't release the album. Sibal on the song stated, "This song "Ladli" is for all the women in the world who spread cheer among the people around. For me, a woman is someone who stands tall despite difficult situations. She is a creator, nurturer, which is why we thought we would pay respects to a woman." In May 2014, whilst on board with Rahman's Infinite Love Concert in Singapore, K. S. Chithra had begun recording the track "Sach Kahoon" for the album.

== Track listing ==
The album contains seven tracks and reflects the current social scenario of India mixed with the lyricist Kapil Sibal's personal experiences. Sibal had worked on the songs for more than a year and half. The songs range from being an individual's journey through life to the story of a woman who struggles to eventually become successful.

All lyrics are written by Kapil Sibal; all music is composed by A. R. Rahman.

Raunaq
No.	Title	Artist(s)	Length
1.	"Laadli"	Lata Mangeshkar, A. R. Rahman	05:56
2.	"Sach Kahoon"	K. S. Chithra, A. R. Rahman	05:34
3.	"Geet Gaaon"	Jonita Gandhi	05:45
4.	"Aa Bhi Jaa"	Jonita Gandhi	05:48
5.	"Kismat Se"	Shreya Ghoshal	04:52
6.	"Kho Jaayein Hum"	Shweta Pandit, Jyoti	05:16
7.	"Khatta Meetha"	Mohit Chauhan	04:01
Total length:			37:06

== Marketing and release ==
A. R. Rahman announced the album through his YouTube channel on 1 May 2014. The 36 second teaser clip introduces the album title Raunaq, backed by the song "Aa Bhi Jaa" by Jonita Gandhi and an image where Rahman is working on the music with Sibal sitting next to him. A personal incident with his son A. R. Ameen wherein the story revealed that he was working on the post-production of the album during the same month. Kapil Sibal announced the album through his official website. As a part of the promotional purposes, stills from the music video inspired by Raja Ravi Varma's paintings were released on 28 May 2014, ahead of the album release with Yami Gautam being a part of the same video. Sanujeet Bhujabal, marketing director of Sony Music India, revealed that they were marketing the album across social and online paid media making initiatives on social media vary from meet and greets to music programming strategies. Moreover, the activity will take place across Facebook, Twitter, Google+, Line and on A. R. Rahman's and Kapil Sibal's social media handles. He further added that the album being a visual story telling sort of, the targets were to run multiple Cost Per View (CPV) campaigns. Each song will have an individual marketing and promotional activity releasing over a period of time. Sony Music Entertainment had exclusively partnered with Fever FM as the radio partner, Nokia digital download store and MTV Indies as their music channel partner.

The introductory launch for the album was held on 31 May 2014 at Mumbai, with the presence of Bollywood actor Salman Khan. Commercial music streaming service Gaana released the first track "Kismat Se" sung by Shreya Ghoshal as a single from the album on the same day. The track "Aa Bhi Jaa" sung by Jonita Gandhi was released on 29 June through 4K-Ultra high definition version and thus became India's first video song to be released in this format. Sony Music hosted the premiere of the video song exclusively on 28 June, owing to the anticipation of viewers and listeners, with Sanujeet opining that "watching a video in this format is an immersive experience in itself" and A. R. Rahman stating that "We wanted this video to be in a format that gives viewers a visual delight as the essence of the video is taken from Raja Ravi Varma's paintings". The song featured Yami Gautam and Muzammil Ibrahim which focuses on love and separation during the days of dynasties ruling India. The track "Laadli" sung by Lata Mangeshkar was released on 1 September 2014, during the occasion of the film's music launch. The video of the song starts with a girl running with a paper airplane. It proceeds with the phases of her life and the kind of laughter she brings among her friends and family. She fights for another girl who is molested by a group of men on the street and rescues her, whilst on-lookers do nothing about it. The song finishes with her fulfilling her ambition of becoming an air force pilot.

== Reception ==
After an introductory launch of the album in May 2014, Rahman published the eight-song soundtrack on 1 September 2014 at another function held in Mumbai, with lyricist Kapil Sibal among other celebrities being present. He further added the soundtrack will be dedicated to Vogue Empower, a social awareness initiative that focuses on women empowerment. The audio CD tracks were released directly into the market on 15 October 2014, a month after its launch.

The album received mostly mixed to positive reviews from listeners. Namrata Thaker of Bollywoodlife.com commented the track "Aa Bhi Jaa" in her review for the song, opined the music of the film as "fantastic" and commented " the Mozart of Madras (A. R. Rahman) has done a fine job with the music as always". For the visuals of the song, Namrata called it as "delightful" and stated "the track has been shot beautifully and the 4K ultra high definition makes it worth watching even more", further adding that "the visuals reminds us of the American fantasy series Game of Thrones". Vipin Nair of Music Aloud called "Raunaq has some nice music from A R Rahman, but lacks the wow element as an album. Given that this is the first proper non-film album from the maestro in over five years, one would have expected more", and added Geet Gaaoon, Sach Kahoon, Laadli and Kho Jaayein Hum as his favourite picks from the album, with a rating of 7 out of 10. Karthik Srinivasan of Milliblog had commented "Rahman provides more than adequate luster to this Raunaq". Critic Ramesh Bala in his review for Assorted Collections stated that "the album is filmy with great compostions by A R Rahman but lacks enough punch for multiple listens" and rated 7.5 out of 10. Sunil Khatar in his musical review for The Indian Express, stated that "the album hardly resembles anything that A. R. Rahman has offered before", but called "even by his standards, the album sounds very original and thus proving his stamina of setting trends is not worn out yet". He concluded the review saying that "the album should be a consolation for all the listeners who thought A. R. Rahman had drifted apart from his melodic days".

== Album credits ==
Credits adapted from A. R. Rahman's official website

Backing vocals

Dr. Narayan, Nivas, Santhosh Hariharan, Deepak Blue, Arjun Chandy, Yazin Nizar, Pooja Vaidyanath, Maalavika Sundar, Sowmya Raoh, Veena Murali, Niranjana Ramanan, Maria Roe Vincent, Varsha, Surbhi, Shashaa Tirupati, Debolina Bose, Swagatha Sundar & K.M.M.C. Choir

Personnel

- Flute: Naveen Kumar, Kiran Kumar
- Guitars: Keba Jeremiah, Vinay Sridhar
- Shehnai: Balesh
- Sitar: Asad Khan
- Tabla: Sai Shravanam
- Drums: Yash Pathak
- Percussions: Anandan Sivamani
- Woodwinds: Kamalakhar
- Brass: Raghav Sachar
- Indian Rhythm: T. Raja, Kumar, Neelakandan, Raju, Laxminarayan, Vedachalam Venkat, Kaviraj, Sai Shravanam, Satyanarayana

Production

- Producer: A. R. Rahman
- Mastering: S. Sivakumar
- Chennai Strings Orchestra: V. J. Srinivasamurthy (at AM Studios, Chennai)
- Sound Engineers:
  - Suresh Permal, T. R. Krishna Chetan, Hentry Kuruvilla, Srinidhi Venkatesh, R. Nitish Kumar, Santhosh Dhayanidhi, Ishaan Chhabra, Vinay Sridhar (at Panchathan Record Inn, Chennai)
  - S. Sivakumar, Kannan Ganpat, Karthik Sekaran, Ananthakrishnan, Pradeep Menon (at AM Studios, Chennai)
  - Tony Joy, Kevin Doucette (at Panchathan Hollywood Studios, Los Angeles)
- Music Supervision: Srinivas, Srinidhi Venkatesh
- Project Manager: Srinivas
- Mixing: Ishaan Chhabra, R. Nitish Kumar, P. A. Deepak
- Additional Programming: T. R. Krishna Chetan, Pravin Mani, Hentry Kuruvilla, Suresh Permal
- Music co-ordinators: Noell James, Vijay Mohan Iyer
- Musicians' Fixer: R. Samidurai
