= Lekar Hum Deewana Dil (soundtrack) =

Soundtrack album by A. R. Rahman
- Released: 13 June 2014 (Digital); 27 June 2014 (Physical)
- Recorded: 2013–2014
- Venues: Panchathan Record Inn and AM Studios, Chennai; Panchathan Hollywood Studios, Los Angeles
- Genre: Feature film soundtrack
- Length: 24:59
- Language: Hindi
- Label: Eros Music
- Producer: A. R. Rahman

A. R. Rahman chronology
Million Dollar Arm (2014)	Lekar Hum Deewana Dil (2014)	The Hundred-Foot Journey (2014)
External audio
- Audio Jukebox on YouTube

Singles from Lekar Hum Deewana Dil
- 1. "Khalifa" Released: 30 May 2014; 2. "Maaloom" Released: 6 June 2014

Lekar Hum Deewana Dil is the soundtrack album, composed by A. R. Rahman, to the 2014 Hindi film of the same name, directed by Arif Ali that stars Armaan Jain and Deeksha Seth in the lead roles. The film is jointly produced by Saif Ali Khan, Dinesh Vijan and Sunil Lulla under the banner of Eros International and Illuminati Films. The album features six tracks, and was digitally released on 13 June 2014 on Eros Music.

== Development ==
A. R. Rahman revealed his inclusion in the debut film of Arif Ali in early 2014. The first track "Khalifa" was written and composed in a single night, a result of the team's jamming sessions. The film's producer stated, "Khalifa was composed during the first recording session that we had with Rahman Sir. The track just came together with a life of its own and it sets the tone of the album." A discotheque cum party song, "Khalifa" translates to "leader" in English and the overall lyrical content represents— "The daredevil attitude of today's youth." The track was extensively programmed with electronic music base. Singer Mahesh Vinayakram has performed the Konnakol—an Indian form of vocal percussion in the song. Singer Shweta Pandit and Suzanne D'Mello have performed opening lines as a "rap" in Hindi. It was the former's first attempt to rap, diversifying her usual styles of singing. On the composition Rahman explained that he didn't wanted to do a regular club song. Lyricist Amitabh Bhattacharya, producer Dinesh Vijan and director Arif Ali were on board the flight to Chennai. The producer started playing the musical patches Arif Ali had taken from A. R. Rahman. He stated to Ali that the hook words "Nainon Se, Nainon Se" might work as a party number. However, it was the lyricist who was struck with the hook word "Khalifa". In an interview with Mumbai Mirror Rahman stated, "I liked the word Khalifa. There's a popular American rapper by the name too. The word's significance in the religious context dates back to a 1000 years, but it is also used today by the younger generation as a synonym for 'Hey Chief',". He added that he was supposed to sing "Alaahda" song but the team convinced him to record "Khalifa". The song was recorded at the end, just two days prior to its promotional release. On this development, Arif Ali quoted, "'Khalifa' took off a year after it was first planned. It is not a usual Rahman song yet I was confident it would work. But with all the music that is happening, I was not surprised that it took time to pick up. But as it is usual with Rahman sir, we recorded "Beqasoor", a song we were in no hurry for, first while this one kept getting pushed." Both the songs "Mawali Qawwali" with "Khalifa" were featured in the theatrical trailer of the film. The song received positive reception upon release.

The track "Beqasoor" was recorded in a hotel room in Singapore when she was on board with Rahman's Infinite Love Concert in Singapore. According to Rahman, the hook line of the track "Tu Shining" was inspired from an e-mail sent to him by Danny Boyle post their successes of 127 Hours. The last lines of the e-mail were "Shine like a diamond". Using these lines in the year span of 2011-2012 Rahman had composed a patch tune. In 2013, when the requirement of a song that began with "Tu Shining", during the recording session for the film the patch tune was approved by Ali. "Tu Shining" was a suggestive by Hriday Gattani whereas lyricist Amitabh Bhattacharya worked on the complete lyrics of the energetic track. Later, Hriday was also offered the free-spirited song "Maaloom" with Jonita Gandhi.

== Release ==
The video teaser of "Khalifa" sung by A. R. Rahman was released on 28 May 2014, and the single was released on 30 May 2014. The teaser of song "Maaloom" was released on 5 June 2014, and the full song was released the next day. The full songs were released on 13 June 2014.

As a promotional event, an unplugged concert was planned at Hard Rock Cafe in Worli, Mumbai whose venue was eventually shifted. Also reported as the physical launch of the music album, the concert was held on 27 June 2014 at JW Marriott in Mumbai. The concert had A. R. Rahman playing the piano to the vocal performance of singers on their respective songs of the soundtrack. The event was attended by the crew of the film and Imtiaz Ali, Karan Johar, Amit Sadh, Anita Adjania, Kapoor family—notably Karisma Kapoor, Kareena Kapoor Khan Rishi Kapoor, Neetu Singh, Randhir Kapoor, Babita.

== Critical response ==
=== Songs ===
The soundtrack album received mixed critical reception. Anish Mohanty of Planet Bollywood gave a positive review of the album praising all the songs in it. Behindwoods gave the album a rating of 3.25 / 5.0 and the verdict was Light, bright and lively!, Devesh Sharma of Filmfare gave the album 2 out of 5 and wrote, "Rahman sure keeps an ear to the ground and knows what today's youngsters are listening to. He's given them the best of the both worlds by peppering a Hindi film OST with strains of world music and EDM." At the Indian Express, Suanshu Khurana who assigned the album just one star stated, "A R Rahman fails to recreate magic with Lekar Hum Deewana Dil. One of Rahman's most scattered albums. Ever." Critical review board of Behindwoods quoted the album as– "Light, bright and lively !". At MusicAloud the soundtrack scores 8 (out of 10), the critic writes, "In a year (2014) that has seen A R Rahman in splendid form, Lekar Hum Deewana Dil is definitely a blip. But it does have some lovely music to offer." Joginder Tuteja for Rediff gave the album 3 stars out of 5 and mentioned, "Though not memorable, Lekar Hum Deewana Dil can't be dismissed either." Aishwarya for Koimoi assigned 3.5 (out of 5) and noted, "Being refreshingly innovative with the electronic sound base and Amitabh Bhattacharya's penmanship, this album is a relief from the stale churnings that Bollywood have recently seen in the name of item numbers being the USP for albums."Time Out magazine gave the album 3.5 stars (out of 5) and noted, "The latest Rahman album is a bit of a letdown". Pavan Jha of BBC Radio gave the album an average of 2.5 to 3 on a scale of 5 and stated that overall, the album falls short of expectations especially after Rahman's Hindi release Highway Rajiv Vijayakar of Bollywood Hungama assigned the album 2 stars (out of 5) and noted, "Taken by that exalted yardstick, Armaan Jain, Kapoor's grandson, gets the weakest musical debut. The music is intended to be cool and youthful, but frankly we see only a microcosm of GenY taking to it."

=== Background score ===
Madhureeta Mukherjee for The Economic Times said, "Few of the songs (AR Rahman) stand out."Rajeev Masand who compared the film as partial downgraded form of 2002 film Saathiya stated, "A. R. Rahman has come up with a lesser soundtrack than the one he composed then." Blessy Chettiar for Deccan Chronicle notes, "A.R. Rahman associated with the original score, the score and songs are expected great, but that remains undistinguished like the film." At the India-West critic R. M. Vijayakar criticised the songs and score stating, "A.R. Rahman's score has little purpose and is devoid of melody, meaning or substance, and Amitabh Bhattacharya is at his worst in his lyrics as well – sample meaningless words, especially the offensive "Mawwaali Qawwaali", which is an item song on an almost naked dancer when the word “Qawwali” actually stands for devotional Muslim music!" Sneha May Francis of Emirates 24/7 summarized, "Melodies tuned by music maestro A R Rahman, you can't help but ignore the similarity with Imtiaz’s own Rockstar." Anupriya Kumar for Reuters noted, "A.R. Rahman's score is uneven but dazzles at times – Khalifa works perfectly as the movie's peppy opening number, and if you could look past its bizarre picturisation, Mawwali Qawwali lends the film its most energetic minutes." Anuj Kumar for The Hindu stated, "Composer A. R. Rahman is unusually off colour in the film to help the cause." Shubhra Gupta for The Indian Express wondered on the inclusion of A. R. Rahman's for the score of this film, calling the fact 'unbelievable'. At Koimoi, critic Manohar Basu felt that A. R. Rahman's score is heart-breaking, forgettable, mediocre and shockingly bad. Rohit Khilnani for Headlines Today pointed out, "A R Rahman is not as melodious and below average just like the film." Soumya Srivastava for Hindustan Times said, "AR Rahman's score fails to deliver anything exceptional. "Khalifa" song is perhaps the only stand out, but the rest of the soundtrack is nowhere near what one expects from the maestro." At Mumbai Mirror, Saumil Gandhi figured out, "There are too many songs with too little diversity in the music on display, a problem that even A R Rahman's score cannot solve."

== Track listing ==
All lyrics written by Amitabh Bhattacharya.

Lekar Hum Deewana Dil (Original Motion Picture Soundtrack)
No.	Title	Artist(s)	Length
1.	"Khalifa"	A. R. Rahman, Shweta Pandit, Suzanne D'Mello, Hriday Gattani, Mahesh Vinayakram	5:03
2.	"Maaloom"	Jonita Gandhi, Hriday Gattani, Nakash Aziz	4:16
3.	"Alaahda"	Shiraz Uppal	4:04
4.	"Beqasoor"	Nakash Aziz, Shweta Pandit	4:11
5.	"Tu Shining"	Hriday Gattani	2:59
6.	"Mawali Qawwali"	Raghav, Tanvi Shah	4:26
Total length:			24:59

== Personnel ==
Credits adapted from CD liner notes.

Musician credits

- Backing vocals— Maria Roe Vincent, Aanchal, Pooja Vaidyanath, Bianca Pinto, Sunayana Das Gupta
- Guitar: Bappi, Keba Jeremiah
- Bass: Keith Peters, Keba Jeremiah
- Sarod: Seenu
- Drums: Satnam
- Whistle: Srinidhi Venkatesh

Production

- Producer: A. R. Rahman
- Mastering: Donal Whelan at Mastering World
- Mastering assistance: Gethin John
- Engineers: Suresh Permal, T. R. Krishna Chetan, Srinidhi Venkatesh, R. Nitish Kumar, Jerry Vincent, Vinay S. Hariharan (Panchathan Record Inn)
- Music supervisor: Srinidhi Venkatesh
- String engineer: V.J. Srinivasamurthy (Chennai Strings Orchestra)
- Mixing: Tony Joy, Ishaan Chhabra, Kevin Doucette (Panchathan Hollywood Studios)
- Music co-ordinator: Noell James, Vijay Mohan Iyer
- Musicians' fixer: R. Samidurai
