= Muhammad: The Messenger of God (soundtrack) =

Muhammad: The Messenger of God (Original Motion Picture Soundtrack)

Soundtrack album by A. R. Rahman
- Released: 23 December 2015
- Recorded: 2013–15; Scoring Stage Babelsberg, Germany; Studio Piccolo, Paris; Click Studio, Cairo; Panchathan Record Inn, Chennai; A. R. Studios, Mumbai
- Length: 1:09:44
- Language: Arabic
- Label: Sony DADC
- Producer: A. R. Rahman

A. R. Rahman chronology
Tamasha (2015)	Muhammad: The Messenger of God (Original Motion Picture Soundtrack) (2015)	24 (2016)

Muhammad: The Messenger of God—Original Motion Picture Soundtrack is the soundtrack album composed by A. R. Rahman (featuring the trio Le Trio Joubran) to the 2015 Iranian Islamic epic film of the same name. The film is directed by Majid Majidi and co-written with Kambuzia Partovi. The soundtrack was released by Sony DADC on 23 December 2015.

The soundtrack was adjudged as one of the "Best Scores of Asia in 2015" by Movie Music UK magazine.

== Background ==
A. R. Rahman's inclusion in the project was confirmed in May 2014. Rahman had already done a song for the 2008 Indian release of the 1976 film about the prophet The Message (Al-Risala). It took six months for him to understand the kind of score that Majid Majidi wanted for "Muhammad: The Messenger of God". He worked on the score for a year and a half. Singer Sami Yusuf has recorded a track featured only in the film. In November 2014, Rahman recorded with the Le Trio Joubran for the score. Further sessions of recording with the trio were held in Paris by February 2015. Orchestral music was recorded in Berlin.Geoff Foster co-produced the motion picture score with Rahman. The score comprises experimental melodies and rhythms. A. R. Rahman recorded the music along with Dilshaad Shabbir Shaikh son of playback singer Shabbir Kumar, across five countries including India, Iran, Germany, France and Egypt with 200 musicians .

The score of Muhammad: The Messenger of God combines emotional music performed by a symphony orchestra, blended with instruments and vocal soloists. This brings touches of geographic and historical specificity to the project. The opening track "Prologue – The Infinite Light" is an array of vocals, whispers, and chant which gradually emerges into a brass-led crescendo. The tracks "Signs of the Last Prophet," "The Birth," "Through the Sands," and "And He Was Named Muhammad (SAL)," is choral in arrangement. Tracks "Halima’s (RA) Healing," "A Mother’s Advice to Her Son," "The Last Hajj of Abdul Mutallib (AS)," and "The Sermon," use the voices extrovertly to depict religious feelings. Several cues of the score have traditional orchestral arrangement, especially the usage of strings and woodwinds. The track "Ababeel" is used in an action sequence, centered around brass clusters, drumbeats, and deep choral accents. The track "The Camel’s Divine Intervention," is upbeat with intricate pieces that layers orchestral music with sounds of oud.

== Track listing ==
Muhammad: The Messenger of God (Original Motion Picture Soundtrack)
No.	Title	Performer(s)	Length
1.	"Prologue - The Infinite Light"	Nikhita Gandhi, Faarooqi Parissa	02:36
2.	"Makkah 740 AD"	A. R. Rahman	02:07
3.	"Ababeel"	Dilshaad Shabbir Shaikh	05:51
4.	"Signs of the Last Prophet"	Nikhita Gandhi	03:59
5.	"The Birth..."	Arpita Gandhi	03:01
6.	"And He was Named Muhammad (SAL)"	Nikhita Gandhi	04:26
7.	"Le Trio Joubran's Roubama"	A. R. Rahman	02:53
8.	"The Camel's Divine Intervention"	Le Trio Joubran	02:39
9.	"Through the Sands"	Le Trio Joubran	04:02
10.	"Abraha"	A. R. Rahman	04:34
11.	"Halima's (RA) healing"	Sana Moussa	02:36
12.	"The Land of Friendship"	A. R. Rahman	02:36
13.	"Le Trio Joubran's Shajaan"	A. R. Rahman	01:06
14.	"Mother's Advice To Her Son"	Arpita Gandhi	03:51
15.	"The Search"	A. R. Rahman	02:06
16.	"Protecting the Innocent"	A. R. Rahman	03:54
17.	"The Last Hajj of Abdul Mutallib (AS)"	Le Trio Joubran & Dilshaad Shabbir Shaikh	03:08
18.	"The Sea Miracle"	Natalie Di Luccio	05:35
19.	"The Sermon"	A. R. Rahman	03:02
20.	"Ya Muhammad (SAL)"	A. R. Rahman, Sana Moussa, Dilshaad Shabbir Shaikh, Osama El-Khouly	05:24
Total length:			01:09:44

== Album credits ==
Credits adapted from the CD liner notes of soundtrack album.

=== Choirs and orchestra ===
- Music Assistant: Dilshaad Shabbir Shaikh
- Choirs – K.M.M.C. Choir, Babelsberg Choir
- Choir Supervision – Adam Greig, Arjun Chandy
- Orchestra –Filmochestra Babelsberg
- Orchestrator and conductor – Matt Dunkley
- Orchestra manager – Klaus-Peter Beyer,

Backing Vocals

A. R. Raihanah, Isshrath Quadhre, Arpita Gandhi, Arjun Chandy, Saranya Srinivasan, Ameena, Aisha Sayyed, Nitishree, Shashaa Tirupati, Aditi Paul

Personnel

- Oud – Le Trio Joubran, Additional Oud - Ebrahim Alavi, Tapas Roy
- Ney – Irfan (in Tehran), Kamlakar
- Duduk – Kamlakar
- Saz – Tapas Roy
- Flute – Kamalakar, Naveen Kumar
- Percussion – Youssef Hbeisch

Special credits for the track "Ya Muhammad (SAL)"

- Lyrics – Traditional
- Vocals – A. R. Rahman, Sana Moussa, Dilshaad Shabbir Shaikh, Osama El-Khouly
- Percussions – Hossam Ramzy, Youssef Hbeisch
- Youth choir (from Cairo) – Osama El-Khouly, Ashraf Seleem, Naser Hassan, Ahmad Effat, Jan Boushra
- Children's choir (from Cairo) – Miss. Basant Ashraf, Master Tarek Ashraf, Master Khaled Mohamad, Master Mazen Yosry
- Music engineer – Bassem Sobhy (in Cairo)

Production

- Score recording and mixing – Geoff Foster
- Music Assistant - Dilshaad Shabbir Shaikh
- Additional mixing – Ishaan Chhabra
- Score co-ordinator – Arpita Gandhi
- Assistant Scoring Engineers – Vinay Sridhar, Karthik Sekaran (at Y.M. Studio Mix Room)
- Engineers –
  - • Suresh Permal, Ishaan Chhabra, Vinay Sridhar Hariharan, TR Krishna Chetan, Srinidhi Venkatesh, R Nitish Kumar, Karthik Sekaran (at Panchathan Record Inn)
  - • Vincent Bruley (at Studio Piccolo, Paris)
- Music Programming – Ishaan Chhabra, Hentry Kuruvilla, Santhosh Dhayanidhi, Jerry Sylvester Vincent, TR Krishna Chetan, Dilshaad Shabbir Shaikh
- Musicians' fixer – R. Samidurai, Vijay Iyer
