= Jana Gana Mana (music video) =

2000 indian music video

Jana Gana Mana is a music video produced in 2000 featuring a number of prominent Indian musicians and singers performing the Indian national anthem "Jana Gana Mana." The video was released on 26 January 2000 to mark the 50th year of the Constitution of India and the Republic Day. It has the distinction of being released by the then President of India, in the Central Hall of the Indian Parliament. It was produced by Bharat Bala and Kanika Myer and published by Ministry of Culture, Youth Affairs and Sports, Government of India.

Bharat Bala and A. R. Rahman came together to create a historic album called 'Jana Gana Mana'. This was a project in which over 35 top artists of the nation came together to sing or play the national anthem. The project had started as "Desh Ko Salaam" which was telecast in Indian TV channels and on the web on 15 August 1999, in which several great Indian musicians, from the classical to the contemporary, came together to give a soulful and modern rendition of the National Anthem. The video was released on 26 January 2000.

== Artistes ==
The music was produced and arranged by A.R. Rahman.

=== Vocalists ===
The people in the music video include :

- Lata Mangeshkar
- M. Balamuralikrishna
- Kavita Krishnamurti
- S. P. Balasubrahmanyam
- Hariharan
- D. K. Pattammal
- Asha Bhosle
- Jagjit Singh
- Bhimsen Joshi
- Saddique Khan Langa
- Pandit Jasraj
- Bhupen Hazarika

Extra track include :

- Ustad Ghulam Mustafa Khan with Murtuza Mustafa Khan & Qadir Mustafa Khan
- Ajoy Chakrabarty with Kaushiki Chakraborty
- Shobha Gurtu
- Begum Parveen Sultana
- Rashid Khan
- Shruti Sadolikar (Kavita Krishnamurti solo backing voice track)
- P. Unnikrishnan with Sudha Raghunathan
- Nithyasree Mahadevan (D. K. Pattammal solo backing voice track)

=== Instrumentalists ===
- Bansuri: Hariprasad Chaurasia
- Sarod: Amjad Ali Khan, Amaan Ali Khan, Ayaan Ali Khan
- Santoor: Shivkumar Sharma, Rahul Sharma
- Ghattam: Vikku Vinayakram, Uma Shankar
- Mohan Veena: Vishwa Mohan Bhatt
- Saxophone: Kadri Gopalnath
- Chitraveena: N. Ravikiran
- Veena: E. Gayathri
- Sarangi: Sultan Khan
- Sitar: Kartick Kumar, Niladri Kumar
- Violin: Kumaresh, Ganesh

=== Orchestra ===
- Conductor: K. Srinivas Murthy
- Cello: Ramsekar, R K Vijayandran, Bidyur Khayal
- Tympany: Kumar, Karthikeyan
- Violin: M Kalyanasundaram, Jerry Fernandes, Cyril Fernandes, R Joseph, K Murali, B J Chandru, B Balu, Murali, Dinakar, Rex Isaac, Debu Ashish, PJ Sebastian, P S Ramachandran
- Mridangam: D A Srinivas
- Harp: R Visweswaran

== The Making ==
Bharat Bala and Kanika had been working together on various projects such as Vande Mataram (1996, 1998) and Desh Ka Salaam (1999) when they realised that there was not a single popular rendering of the Indian National Anthem. They thus decided to re-create the National Anthem in a year 2000 version, something that should be 'inspiring for young people to listen to.'

Bharat Bala Productions roped in A R Rahman to produce the music and 60 artistes were taken to Ladakh in North India to film the video for the instrumental version of the video. The final instrumental was a 40-piece string section along with Pandit Shiv Kumar Sharma, Vikku Vinayakram and other instrumental maestros of Indian classical music. Most of the performances included two generations of maestros - fathers and sons. In Kanika’s words, "It was a huge musical unification... this anthem has so much of soul."

It is also notable that during the filming of the anthem with the Ladakh Scouts, there were about 500 jawans who fought during the Kargil war. The producers hoisted a huge flag about 40 feet long for the video in their honour.

Thota Tharini, an artist based out of Madras painted what is now the Vande Mataram logo for the video.

== Error and Correction ==
There are many versions of this video in circulation. One of the versions has recitation of the words "Jaya He" (Victory to thee) four times, instead of three. This fourth time recitation of "Jaya He" by Asha Bhosle has been omitted in the corrected version.
