= Kaaviya Thalaivan (soundtrack) =

2014 soundtrack album by A. R. Rahman

- Soundtrack cover

Soundtrack album by A. R. Rahman
- Released: 21 August 2014
- Recorded: 2012–2014
- Venues: Panchathan Record Inn and AM Studios, Chennai
- Length: 33:58
- Language: Tamil
- Label: Sony Music India
- Producer: A. R. Rahman

A. R. Rahman chronology
The Hundred-Foot Journey (2014)	Kaaviya Thalaivan (2014)	I (2014)

Singles from Kaaviya Thalaivan
- 1. "Vaanga Makka Vaanga" Released: 1 September 2014; 2. "Yaarumilla" Released: 11 August 2014; 3. "Aye Mr. Minor!" Released: 18 August 2014

Kaaviya Thalaivan is the 2014 soundtrack album to the Tamil historical fiction film of the same name, written and directed by Vasanthabalan. It stars Prithviraj Sukumaran, Siddharth, Vedhika and Anaika Soti in the lead roles. A. R. Rahman has composed the original songs and score for the film. Being a period film, the music of film reflects the sounds during the 1920s pre-Independence Indian era. The album marks poet Vaalee's last lyrical work for this A. R. Rahman musical film. Prior to recording the original songs, Rahman carried out a research for six months for the music. Majority of the tracks were recorded by nine months, beginning from October 2012. Every song in the film has an underlying concept that justifies the screenplay. Prior to the album release, three tracks "Vaanga Makka Vaanga", "Yaarumilla" and "Aye Mr. Minor!" were released as singles on 1 September, 1 October and 17 October. The original version of the album that released on 19 August 2014 was aired through Suryan FM.

== Development ==
A. R. Rahman revealed that he backed out from the Hollywood fantasy film Seventh Son to compose for Kaaviya Thalaivan, because it gave him the scope to innovate with folk music like never before. He had done six months research for the music of the film, especially working on nuances of several ragas and folk music prior to recording actual compositions. From October 2012 to July 2013 Rahman finished composing 90% of the songs, prior to commencement of filming. The makers did not finish a schedule and waited for Rahman to give them another song. Initially, the makers were skeptical about A. R. Rahman's agreement to the project. For an undisclosed song in the album, Rahman composed the lyrical tuning to six different iterations. Rahman was well aware of singer Haricharan's strong foundation in classical music. Unlike usual recording routes, the composer and singer had an impromptu sort of jamming session. Haricharan was diffident on the over-dramatizing lyrical works but agreed later. As per The Hindu, he was quoted saying "It is a period movie about street theatre, I trained myself by listening to legendary singers such as S. G. Kittappa and M. K. Thyagaraja Bhagavathar." Haricharan has sung for ten tracks (inclusive of bit songs) in the album. The complete album was supposed to be written by Vaali but his untimely demise, he wrote the track "Alli Arjuna" for the soundtrack, his last poetic contribution to Tamil music. For this conversational track, Haricharan sang for both the characters 'Krishna' and 'Arjuna' by bringing alterations in his voice. As per the producer, S. Sashikanth, "Every song in this movie has a concept behind it. With "Yaarumilla" – that particular idea was based on the romance between Kitappa and KB Sundarambal. There were letters that Sundarambal had sent to Kitappa which are supposed to be on par with Shakespearan love letters! So the song's inspiration comes from that."

In an interview with Deccan Chronicle Rahman was quoted saying, "Being a period film and the subject being about a dramatic trouple, I needed to go into the subject in some depth. Apparently, it was done for people to relate with the music of that era with immediate ease." The film has 20 bit songs of varying lengths that partly form the score. At The Economic Times, Rahman noted, "The limitation was the throw (performing on stage needs high-pitched tunes with dynamism) at which the songs needed to be composed." In October 2013, singer Madhushree announced that she had performed a duet titled "Thamana" with S. P. Balasubrahmanyam, however the track eventually did not feature in the soundtrack album. Seven original songs in each of the plays are featured in the film. All the compositions reflect the sound and musical preferences of the 1920s era. Director Vasanthabalan selected old verses of Madurakavi Bhaskaradas so as to tune them for selected songs. All the songs were recorded by early May 2014. Vasanthabalan confirmed in early September 2014 that Rahman was working on the background score of the film in his studio in Los Angeles.

== Marketing and release ==
The audio rights of the film were sold to Sony Music India in April 2014. The first single track "Vaanga Makka Vaanga" was released on 1 September 2014. On 15 September 2014, preview clip of track "Sollividu Sollividu" (previously noted as "Karnamotcham") was released on Rahman's SoundCloud channel. The second single "Yaarumilla" was released on 1 October 2014. The video preview clip of the making of the track, "Aye Mr. Minor" was released on YouTube on 8 October 2014, and the full song was released as the third single on 17 October 2014. It was earlier reported that the album would launch on 24 September 2014, but sources confirmed that the album would release digitally on 31 October 2014.

An event for the digital release of the album was held at A. R. Rahman's studio was aired through Suryan FM 93.5 across Tamil Nadu on 31 October 2014. The highlight of the event was an audio – visual presentation of the experiences of five theater artistes. All five namely PC Kalaimani, Nellai Sriram, Anandan, Prasad Rajendran and Tamilarasan were felicitated by A.R. Rahman.

== Critical reception ==
The album received extremely positive reviews upon release. K. Siddharth of Sify stated that Rahman was "at his creative best!" in the album and gave it a rating of 4 out of 5 stars. Behindwoods chose "Vaanga Makka Vaanga", "Aye Mr. Minor!" and "Yaarumilla" as the picks of the album and rated the album 3.75 out of 5 stars, concluding, "Rahman brings back live instrumentation to its full glory !" Vipin of Music Aloud concluded, "One of the year's most awaited soundtracks, and A R Rahman delivers in style. Big props to the singers (not just Haricharan) for a top class effort! Kaaviya Thalaivan. Go listen!", and gave a rating of 9 out of 10 for the album. S. Saraswati of Rediff.com wrote "Music by AR Rahman anchors the film well. Every song takes you back to an era that glorified music and understood its nuances. They form an integral part of the film and give greater depth to the narrative. There are a multitude of songs, but every song is handled differently, ensuring a thoroughly enjoyable experience." R. S. Prakash of Bangalore Mirror called Rahman's work "soothing and adds value" though he felt that it was not the best. Avinash Gopalan of Oneindia Entertainment called the soundtrack and background score as the film's backbone. Haricharan Pudipeddi felt that Rahman's work is one of the places where Kaaviya Thalaivan works.

However, Baradwaj Rangan of The Hindu wrote "The film opens with a dedication to legends like S. G. Kittappa and K. B. Sundarambal, but a soundtrack filled with those kinds of voices would be booed off the screen today. The singers sound lighter, more contemporary, even while rendering bits like Kaayadha Kaanagathe, which was immortalised on screen by T. R. Mahalingam – again, a voice that would most likely make the audience collapse into giggles."

== Chart performance ==
Chart (2014)	Peak position
Top Indian Albums	1

== Release history ==
Album	Region	Release date	Format	Audio label	Ref
Kaaviya Thalaivan (Singles Release)	Worldwide	1 September 2014	Digital Download	Sony Music India	
Kaaviya Thalaivan (Singles Release)	Worldwide	1 October 2014	Digital Download	Sony Music India	
Kaaviya Thalaivan (Singles Release)	Worldwide	17 October 2014	Digital Download	Sony Music India	
Kaaviya Thalaivan (Album Release)	Worldwide	31 October 2014	Digital Download	Sony Music India	
Kaaviya Thalaivan (Album Release)	India	25 December 2014	CD	Sony Music India	
Kaaviya Thalaivan (Album Release)	United States	25 December 2014	CD	Sony Music Entertainment	
Kaaviya Thalaivan (Album Release)	United Kingdom	25 December 2014	CD	Sony Music Entertainment	
Pradhi Nayagan (Malayalam Version)	Worldwide	2 November 2014	Digital Download	Sony Music India	
Premaalayam (Telugu Version)	Worldwide	25 March 2016	Digital Download	Sony Music India	

== Track listing ==
The official track listing was released by Sony Music India on 29 October 2014. The soundtrack album for the original Tamil version was released on 21 August 2014.

=== Tamil Version ===
Kaaviya Thalaivan
No.	Title	Lyrics	Singer(s)	Length
1.	"Vaanga Makka Vaanga"	Na. Muthukumar	Haricharan, Dr. Narayanan	03:36
2.	"Aye Mr. Minor!"	Pa. Vijay	Shashaa Tirupati, Haricharan	04:43
3.	"Sollividu Sollividu"	Pa. Vijay	Mukesh Mohamed	04:24
4.	"Sandi Kuthirai"	Pa. Vijay	Haricharan	03:56
5.	"Yaarumilla"	Pa. Vijay	Shweta Mohan, Srinivas	04:32
6.	"Thiruppugazh^{[c]}"	Arunagirinathar	Vani Jayaram	02:18
7.	"Alli Arjuna^{[a]}"	Vaalee	Haricharan, Bela Shende	10:29
Total length:				33:58

=== Malayalam ===
The soundtrack album for the dubbed Malayalam version, Pradhi Nayagan was released on 2 November 2014.

All lyrics are written by Rafeeq Ahammed.

Pradhi Nayagan
No.	Title	Singer(s)	Length
1.	"Vaa Changaadhi Vaa Vaa"	Haricharan, Dr. Narayanan	03:36
2.	"Aye Kochu Kalla"	Parvathy Jayadevan, Haricharan	04:43
3.	"Mandi Kuthira"	Haricharan	03:56
4.	"Cholluga Nee"	Vishnu Raj	04:24
5.	"Aarumilla"	Bela Shende, Srinivas	04:32
6.	"Kaamasharakshigal"	Vani Jayaram	02:18
7.	"Naadaga Gaanangal^{[b]}"	Haricharan, K. S. Chithra	10:29
Total length:			33:58

=== Telugu ===
The soundtrack album for the dubbed Telugu version Premaalayam was released on 25 March 2016.

Premaalayam
No.	Title	Lyrics	Singer(s)	Length
1.	"Randi Babu Randi"	Vanamali	Haricharan, Dr. Narayanan	03:37
2.	"Hey Hey Mister"	Kandikonda	Shashaa Tirupati, Haricharan	04:42
3.	"Aye Kanya Gurram"	Vanamali	Haricharan	03:58
4.	"Arjunuda"	Vanamali	Hemachandra	04:22
5.	"Chalunaya"	Kandikonda	Bela Shende, Srinivas	04:30
6.	"Devagananvitha"	Kandikonda	Vani Jayaram	02:18
7.	"Vandhanam"	Vanamali	Haricharan, Shashaa Tirupati, Maalavika Sundar	10:26
Total length:				33:58

== Album credits ==
Backing Vocals

Malavika, Pooja A.V., Sharanya, Dr. Narayanan, Nivas

Personnel

- Rhythm & Percussions - T.Raja, Kumar, Vedachalam, Neelakandan, Vikraman
- Mridangam - Srinivasan
- Nadaswaram - P. K. Thirumurthy
- Harmonium - Prasad, Kovai Natraj, Kuldeep
- Guitar - Pradeep Kumar
- Tabla - Y. P. Prasad, Sai Sharvan
- Flute - Shashank, Kamalakar
- Melodica & Recorder - Kamalakar
- Shehnai - S. Ballesh
- Clarinet - Raju
- Trumpet - Babu
- Dilruba - Saroja
- Veena - Devi
- Mandolin - Seenu

Production

- Producer: A. R. Rahman
- Mastering: S. Sivakumar
- Engineers:
  - Suresh Permal, T. R. Krishna Chetan, Jerry Vincent, Srinidhi Venkatesh, R. Nitish Kumar, Vinay S Hariharan (at Panchathan Record Inn)
  - S. Sivakumar, Kannan Ganpat, Pradeep, Karthik Sekaran, Anantha Krishnan (at A.M. Studios)
- Music supervisor: Srinidhi Venkatesh
- Project Manager: Suresh Permal
- Chennai Strings Orchestra & Sunshine Orchestra: V.J. Srinivasamurthy (at AM Studios)
- Mixing: K. J. Singh
- Additional Programming: Jim Satya, T.R. Krishna Chetan, Hentry Kuruvilla, Marc, Satish Chakravarthy, Santhosh Dhayanithi
- Music co-ordinators: Noell James, Vijay Mohan Iyer
- Musicians' fixer: R. Samidurai

== Notes ==
- ^{^a} The total duration of "Alli Arjuna" as 10:28 but no individual track duration(s) are mentioned for each seven bit songs. The seven bit songs are - "Vandhanam Vandhanam", "Yaadhavanam", "Alli Varugiraal", "Priya Sakhiyae", "Kanna Kanna", "Naan Annathooviyil", "Gettimaelam" and "Nenju Porukkudhillaiyae".
- ^{^b}In the Malayalam version of the soundtrack, the track "Naadaga Gaanangal" is the Malayalam counterpart of "Alli Arjuna" with the same length but the names of individual bit-songs under it were not released officially.
- ^{^c} The song features lyrics from the compilation "Thiruppugazh" written by Saint Arunagirinathar
