= Arjun Chandy =

Indian singer

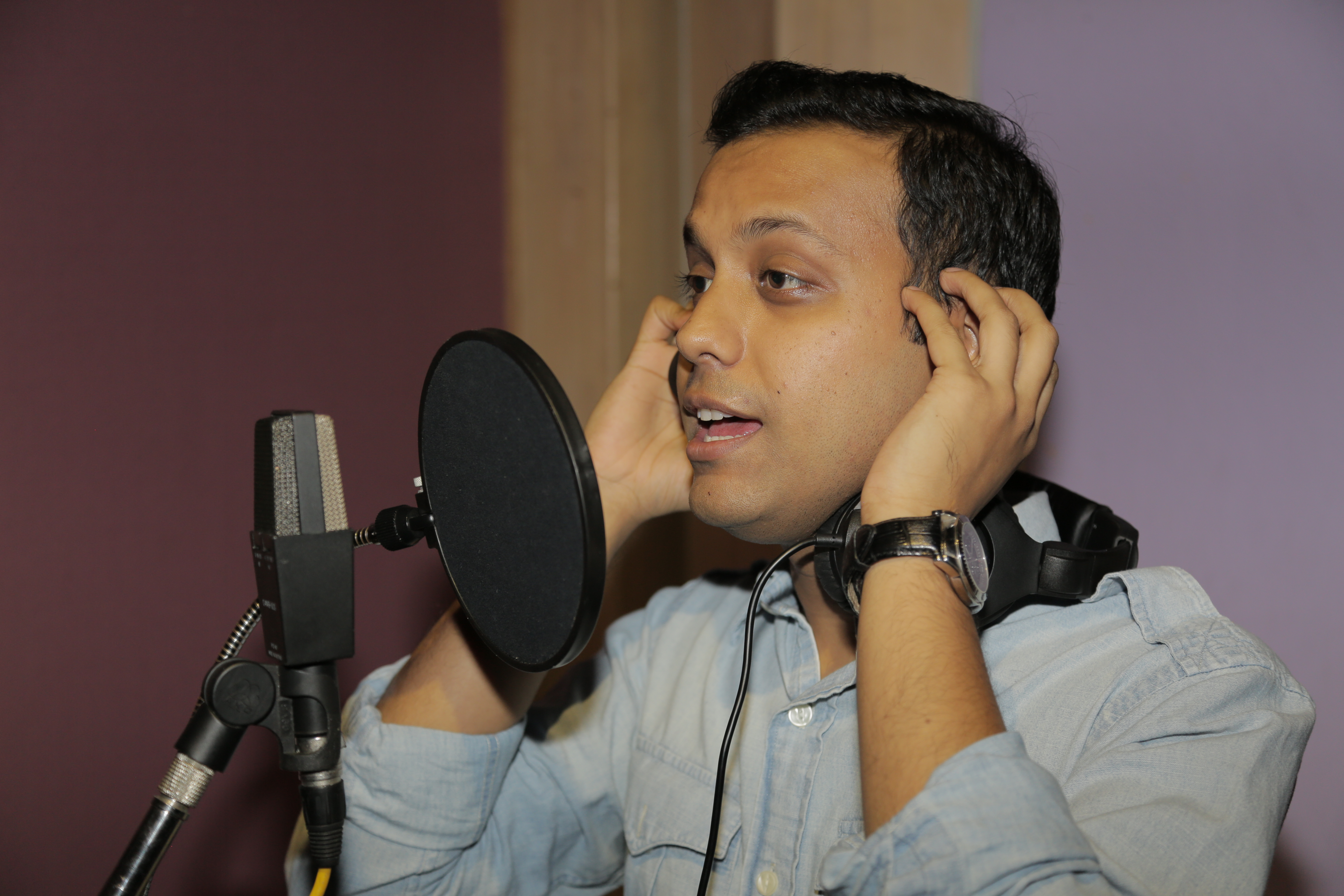
Arjun Chandy in studio

Arjun Chandy is an Indo-american singer, arranger, studio vocalist and vocal group coach from Dallas, Texas.

== Career ==
Chandy is from a family of artists. His infant years were spent heavily immersed in Indian classical music. He completed his vocal arangetram in Dallas and was accompanied by Dr. Venkat Raman on the Violin, Sri. Poovalur Sriji on the Mridangam and Sri. Ramana Indrakumar on the Ghatam. During his school days, he learned to read music and studied music theory, joining the school choir. This helped to understand western classical music. When he was 14, he started singing for a quartet in middle school.

At the age of 15, after getting involved in the world of jazz, he started working professionally, conducting and arranging music for groups in the United States. Later, he became a part of The Vocal Majority in the U.S. Chandy contributed to the formation of "NAFS- The Band" when A. R. Rahman called him to Chennai at the end of 2013. Chandy is presently the band's director and conductor. He spent a year post 2013 to train the band.

In an interview with Seychelles News Agency, Chandy said: "Rahman always wanted to put together a vocal band of sorts, because he loves vocal groups and harmonies, not necessarily a capella but just the sound of a group singing, even if it's a large choir, if there's vocal harmony, he's a big fan of jazz and all these things."

Year	Title	Song(s)	Media(s)	Role(s)	Co-artist(s)	Reference(s)
2013	Global Rhythm: Blueprints from Across the World	—N/a	Concert	Singer, Dialect	—N/a	
2014	Lingaa	—N/a	Film soundtrack	Backing vocals	—N/a	
2015	Tamasha	"Tu Koi Aur Hai"	Film soundtrack	Singer	A. R. Rahman, Alma Ferovic	
2015	Tamasha	—N/a	Film soundtrack	Choir Conductor	Madras Musical Association Choir	
2015	Muhammad: The Messenger of God	—N/a	Film soundtrack	Choir supervision Backing vocals	Adam Creig	
2016	24	"24 Carat"	Film soundtrack	Singer	—N/a	
2016	Mohenjo Daro	"Whispers of the Heart"	Film soundtrack	Singer	–	
2016	Mohenjo Daro	"Whispers of the Mind"	Film soundtrack	Singer	–	
2016	Ae Dil Hai Mushkil	"Bulleya (Film Version)"	Film soundtrack	Backing vocals, Backing vocal design	Geet, Ashwin & Himanshu	
2017	Kaatru Veliyidai	"Azhagiye"	Film soundtrack	singer	Haricharan, Jonita Gandhi	
2017	Hindi Medium	"Hoor"	Film soundtrack	singer	Atif Aslam, Sanjeev Chimmalgi	
2017	2.0	Raajali Nee Gaali	Film soundtrack	Singer	Blaaze, Sid Sriram	
2018	Sarvam Thaala Mayam	Sarvam Thaalamayam	Film soundtrack	Singer	Haricharan	
2018	Agnyaathavaasi	AB Yevaro Nee Baby	Film soundtrack	Singer	Nakash Aziz	
2019	Dev	Anangae Sinungalama	Film soundtrack	Singer	Hariharan, Christopher Stanley, Tippu, Krish, Bharath Sundar, Sharanya Gopinath	
2021	Tamilarasan	Thamizhan Da	Film soundtrack	singer	Nakash Aziz	
2025	The Paradise	The Paradise Theme	Film soundtrack	Singer	Anirudh Ravichander	
2026	DC (film)	Film soundtrack		Harmonies	Anirudh Ravichander	
