= A. S. Laxmi Narayanan =

Indian audio engineer

- Occupations: sound engineer mixer sound editor

A. S. Lakshmi Narayanan is an audiographer - Sound Designer, Production sound mixer and sound editor from Chennai, Tamil Nadu. He is based in Trinity Digi Labs Studio. He won the National Film Award for Best Audiography for his works on acclaimed feature films Kannathil Muthamittal (2002), directed by Mani Ratnam and Kaadhalan (1994), directed by S.Shankar. He has also won the Tamil Nadu State Film Award for Best Audiographer and Kerala State Film Awards for the various regional films over the years.

Some of the iconic films Lakshminarayanan has provided sound design for include Sarkar (2018), 24 (2016), Papanasam (2015), Kaththi (2014), Thuppakki (2012), Ko (2011), 13B (2009), Sivaji: The Boss (2007), Anniyan (2005), Kannathil Muthamittal (2002), Aayitha Ezhuthu (2004), Indian (1996), Bombay (1995) and Iruvar (1997) .

== Career ==
Lakshminarayanan started his career in the Tamil Nadu Film and Television Institute in 1979, and met his fellow audio professional Moorthy at Sujatha Dubbing Theatre, the first computerised dubbing theatre in South India. By 1995, the pair had overseen audiography for over 200 films, working on a number of projects directed by K. Viswanath, Balu Mahendra, Mani Ratnam and K. Balachander. For Aabavanan's Oomai Vizhigal (1986), the duo also completed work on the film's background score.

== Filmography ==
=== Sound designer ===
Year	Film	Director	Notes
1982	Moondram Pirai	Balu Mahendra	Sound Recordist
1983	Sagara Sangamam (Telugu)	K.Vishwanath	
1985	Pagal Nilavu	Mani Ratnam	Sound Recordist
1986	Mouna Ragam	Mani Ratnam	Sound Designer
1987	Nayakan	Mani Ratnam	Sound Designer
1988	Agni Natchathiram	Mani Ratnam	Sound Recordist
1989	Kodiparakkudu	Bharathiraja	Sound Recordist
1990	Anjali	Mani Ratnam	Sound Recordist
1990	Chatriyan	K.Subash	Sound Designer
