= The Hundred-Foot Journey (soundtrack) =

The Hundred-Foot Journey (Original Motion Picture Soundtrack)

Soundtrack album by A. R. Rahman
- Released: August 12, 2014
- Recorded: 2013–2014
- Studio: Manhattan Center Studios, (New York City); Panchathan Hollywood Studios, (Los Angeles); Panchathan Record Inn and AM Studios, (Chennai)
- Genre: World music
- Length: 58:18
- Language: English, Urdu
- Label: Hollywood
- Producer: A. R. Rahman; Geoff Foster

A. R. Rahman chronology
Lekar Hum Deewana Dil (2014)	The Hundred-Foot Journey (Original Motion Picture Soundtrack) (2014)	Kaaviya Thalaivan (2014)

The Hundred-Foot Journey: Original Motion Picture Soundtrack is the soundtrack album to the American comedy-drama film of the same name (based on the novel), directed by Lasse Hallström from a screenplay written by Steven Knight. A. R. Rahman composed the score for the film. Hollywood Records released the soundtrack on August 12, 2014.

== Development ==
In December 2013, a press release featured in The New York Times confirmed A. R. Rahman was scoring the film. The composer began scoring after the completion of filming, wherein he found the film pleasant. After seeing the first cut of the film, he took one and a half months to score it. He stated that the Indian part of the score featured the instruments sitar, sarod and santoor. According to him, a generic score wasn't the immediate requirement but he wanted to weave the screenplay into a theme that doesn't have a marked end or beginning. Thus, the score was organically mixed in a particular way, where the sound cues differentiate between Indian and French. The distinction was brought out dramatically through music when there is a war sort of sequence in the film where both the kitchens are working in parallel. Rahman stated that recording was seamlessly done as per requirement. He said the score has 'western classical music sensibilities'. The director and the composer worked together, communicating via Skype while Rahman was in Los Angeles finishing up Million Dollar Arm and Hallstrom was shooting the film in France.

Rahman hired Indian songwriter Gulzar for a Hindi and Urdu versed song ("Afreen"). Through this track, the score's main themes were developed.

In July 2014, singer Alka Yagnik was recorded for the score. Yagnik agreed to record after deciding that the melodies were meant for her voice quality. She tagged the track "extremely melodious", calling it "not a run of the mill song in an assembly line". Singer Nakash Aziz, through the song "Afreen", and Yagnik mark their respective Hollywood playback debuts through the soundtrack album.

On completion of the score the director of the film was quoted as saying, "The result score is fiercely personal and original." In an interview at Indiewire, Hallström noted that the story has an attraction that he could play around with the merging the sounds and the languages, hence the hybrid score.

"Music could underscore the differences in the culture and the similarities, so we played around a lot with that. I sat with A. R. Rahman in Los Angeles and worked out the score together. I got an opportunity to sit in his laboratory there and see him come up with ideas. That was a fantastic part of making this film, that he invited me to the creative process."

— Lasse Hallström

== Reception ==
"Peter Howell of The Star called it, "A smile-widening score by Slumdog Millionare's A.R. Rahman. The Washington Post's Mark Jenkins stated that the score was exuberant. Variety stated that the film features a "high energy score". Rex Reed of The New York Observer felt "The glittering, throbbing musical score by A. R. Rahman contributes a distinctive flavor of its own to the film." Critic Laura Clifford for Reeling Reviews wrote, "A lot of traditional Indian music in the score". Allison Loring for Film School Rejects wrote, "A wonderful, uplifting score, beautiful music from Rahman. It may not be wholly believable, but it is fantastic escapism. The score has an infectious backbeat and high-energy such was stated by the newspaper The Denver Post.

== Track listing ==
The Hundred-Foot Journey (Original Motion Picture Soundtrack)

All music is composed by A. R. Rahman.

No.	Title	Writer(s)	Length
1.	"Hassan Learns French Cooking"	A. R. Rahman	6:10
2.	"The Village of Saint Antonin"	A. R. Rahman	4:02
3.	"New Beginnings"	A. R. Rahman	4:40
4.	"Vintage Recipe"	A. R. Rahman	2:06
5.	"Mr. Kadam"	A. R. Rahman	1:55
6.	"The Clash"	A. R. Rahman	1:44
7.	"Destiny, Fire, War"	A. R. Rahman	5:40
8.	"The Gift"	A. R. Rahman	3:08
9.	"You Complete Me"	A. R. Rahman	4:39
10.	"Alone in Paris"	A. R. Rahman	3:11
11.	"India Calling"	A. R. Rahman	4:34
12.	"Reunion"	A. R. Rahman	1:25
13.	"End Credits Suite"	A. R. Rahman	2:36
14.	"My Mind Is a Stranger Without You ^{[a]}"	Solange Merdinian, A. R. Rahman	4:18
15.	"A La Hassan de Paris"	A. R. Rahman	4:05
16.	"Afreen (feat. Nakash Aziz, K.M.M.C. Sufi Ensemble)"	Gulzar, A. R. Rahman	4:05
Total length:			58:18

Notes

- ^{^a} Refers to a track not used in the film, but which is a part of the original motion picture soundtrack album recording.

== Personnel ==
- A. R. Rahman - composer, primary artist, producer, soundtrack producer, vocals
- Gaayatri Kaundinya, Shalini Laksmi - vocalists for score
- Prasanna, Peter Calo, George Doering - guitar
- Matt Dunkley - orchestra conductor
- Henry Hey - piano
- Chinna Prasad - tabla
- Naveen Kumar - flute
- Asad Khan - sitar
