= Kyarakoppa =

- Village
- Location in Karnataka, India Kyarakoppa (India)
- Coordinates: 15.79°N 74.75°E
- Country: India
- State: Karnataka
- District: Belgaum
- Talukas: Kittur

Population (2011)
  - Total: 500

Languages
  - Official: Kannada
- Time zone: UTC+5:30 (IST)
- PIN Code: 591112
- Vehicle registration: KA 24

Kyarakoppa is a small village in the taluk of Kittur (before this, it was a part of Bailhongal) of Belgaum district in North Karnataka, India. About 100 families, with total population of around 500 people, live in this village. This tiny village is surrounded by streams and the Malaprabha River. It comes under Devarashigihalli Village Panchayat and Marganakoppa as revenue village. This village is located around 40 km from Belgaum district headquarters to its north and around 17 km from Kittur taluk headquarters to its south. 475 km from State capital Bangalore.

Kyarakoppa is surrounded by Itagi to its south west, Marganakoppa to its south, Devarashigihalli to its south east, Dastikoppa to its west, M K Hubli to its North, Veerapur to its North West. The nearest market place is Itagi village in Khanapur Taluk and villagers are dependent on Itagi for their daily needs. The village's main business is agriculture, they grow sugar cane, paddy, banana and several types of vegetables.
