= Boss (2013 soundtrack) =

2013 soundtrack album

Boss (Original Motion Picture Soundtrack)
- Soundtrack album cover

Soundtrack album by Meet Bros Anjjan, Yo Yo Honey Singh, P. A. Deepak and Chirantan Bhatt
- Released: 9 September 2013
- Recorded: 2012–2013
- Genre: Feature film soundtrack
- Length: 39:45
- Language: Hindi
- Label: T-Series
- Producers: Meet Bros Anjjan; Yo Yo Honey Singh; P.A.Deepak; Chirantan Bhatt; Raghav Bahl; Bhushan Kumar

Meet Bros Anjjan chronology
Zanjeer (2013)	Boss (Original Motion Picture Soundtrack) (2013)	Ragini MMS 2 (2014)

Yo Yo Honey Singh chronology
Chennai Express (2013)	Boss (2013)	Yaariyan (2014)

P. A. Deepak chronology
Jhootha Hi Sahi (2010)	Boss (2013)	Gulaab Gang (2014)

Chirantan Bhatt chronology
Zanjeer (2013)	Boss (2013)	Ishq Actually (2013)

Singles from Boss
- 1. "Boss (Title Track)" Released: 30 August 2013

Boss (Original Motion Picture Soundtrack) is the soundtrack album to the 2013 Hindi-language action comedy film of the same name directed by Anthony D'Souza and stars Akshay Kumar. The album featured nine songs composed by Meet Bros Anjjan, Yo Yo Honey Singh, P. A. Deepak and Chirrantan Bhatt, with Sahil Kaushal (Lil Golu), Manoj Yadav and Kumaar as the lyricists. The title song of the film preceded as the lead single from the album released through digital download on 30 August 2013, and the soundtrack was released under the T-Series label on 9 September 2013. The music received positive reviews from critics.

== Background ==
The soundtrack accompanying the 2013 film Boss consisted of five musical numbers, a theme song, an alternative of one of the original tracks, a remix and a mashup mix, culminating nine tracks in total. Meet Bros Anjjan (Note: a musical project that consists of the duo Meet Bros (Manmeet and Harmeet Singh) and singer-songwriter Anjjan Bhattacharya) composed the title track "Boss Title Song", its remixes, the theme song and "Pitah Se Hai Naam Tera", while Yo Yo Honey Singh co-composed the rap verses for the title track and "Party All Night", P. A. Deepak and Chirrantan Bhatt composed the tracks, "Hum Na Thode" and "Har Kisi Ko", respectively. Manoj Yadav wrote lyrics for the song "Har Kisi Ko" and Sahil Kaushal (Note: credited as Lil Golu) did the same for "Party All Night", the rest of the songs—excluding the theme music—are written by Kumaar. Sandeep Shirodkar composed the film score.

Boss is directed by Anthony D'Souza, produced by Cape Of Good Films and Ashwin Varde Productions, and distributed by Viacom18 Motion Pictures. A remake of the Malayalam film Pokkiri Raja (2010), it stars Akshay Kumar in the lead role, along with Mithun Chakraborty, Shiv Panditt, Ronit Roy and Aditi Rao Hydari in supporting roles. The film was theatrically released on 16 October 2013 to mixed reviews.

== Album information ==
The titular track is the first song from the film and album, composed and performed by Meet Bros Anjjan, with lyrics written by Kumaar, and Yo Yo Honey Singh written, produced and co-composed the rap verses. The song had a remix version produced by DJ Khushi that was included as the album's eighth song. It was further reworked into the song "Boss Ganapati" which was recorded two days before the music launch, owing to Kumar's request. While the tune was similar to the title track, the lyrics were revised in praise of the Hindu god Ganesha. This song was not featured in the film.

The second song "Hum Na Tode" was composed by first-time composer and Grammy Award-winner P. A. Deepak, who previously worked as a music producer, sound engineer and programmer for A. R. Rahman. With lyrics written by Kumaar and sung by Vishal Dadlani, it was adapted from the popular Tamil song "Appadi Podu" from the Vijay-starrer Ghilli (2004) composed by Vidyasagar. "Pitah Se Hai Naam Tera" is the album's third song composed by Meet Bros Anjjan, written by Kumaar and performed by Sonu Nigam and the alap portions by Sanjay Misra. The fourth song "Party All Night" was composed and performed by Yo Yo Honey Singh and written by Sahil Kaushal. An objectionable word in the song was muted after a public interest litigation seeking a stay on the film, was filed at the Delhi High Court. However, Kumar stated that the muted word was not vulgar but had been misinterpreted.

The song "Har Kisi Ko Nahi Milta" composed by Kalyanji–Anandji for the film Janbaaz (1986), was adapted for the film by Chirrantan Bhatt and featured new lyrics written by Manoj Yadav. Two versions of the song were featured in the film—one is a solo version sung by Nikhil D'Souza and the other is a duet version performed by Arijit Singh and Neeti Mohan.

== Marketing and release ==
The title track was released for legal purchase as a digital single on the music platform iTunes on 30 August 2013. The song "Party All Night" was promoted with two teasers released on 5 September, and the full song was released the following day. It was launched on television during the grand finale of the reality television show Dance India Dance Super Moms, where Mithun Chakraborty being one of the judges. (Note: Mithun Chakraborty, also played Kumar's on-screen father in the film.)

The film's soundtrack was released on 9 September 2013, coinciding with Kumar's birthday and the Ganesh Chaturthi festival. It was released in digital and physical formats by the T-Series record label. The song "Boss Ganapathi" was distributed free of cost across all Ganesh pandals in Maharashtra (including Mumbai).

== Music videos ==
The title song featured Kumar along with the singers Yo Yo Honey Singh and Meet Bros Anjjan. Netizens pointed out the visuals of the song sharing similarities with the music video of the popular song "Bad Girls" (2012) featuring M.I.A.

"Party All Night" featured Sonakshi Sinha in a special appearance—her third stint after previously appearing in "Go Go Govinda" from OMG – Oh My God! (2012) and "Thank God Its Friday" from Himmatwala (2013) respectively—along with Kumar and Singh and 600 foreign dancers appearing in the background and was choreographed by Mudassar Khan. The song was shot at a production cost of ₹6 crore (equivalent to ₹10 crore or US$1.1 million in 2023), becoming the most expensive music video produced at that time, while Sinha was charged a fee of ₹60 lakh (equivalent to ₹1.0 crore or US$110,000 in 2023) as a special appearance. "Hum Na Tode" featured Kumar and Prabhu Deva, the latter also choreographed the song. It was released on 26 September 2013.

The solo version of the song "Har Kisi Ko" was released on 13 September 2013. This version featured in the film, was picturized on Panditt and Hydari which was extensively shot in Delhi and Pattaya and was choreographed by Laxman Utekar. The duet version of the song was picturized on Kumar and Sinha, which he described it as a tribute to Feroz Khan. The video song was launched in Dubai on 2 October.

== Critical response ==
Joginder Tuteja, in his review for Rediff.com assigned four stars to the album, stating "this soundtrack with multiple composers and lyricists at the helm of affairs turns out to be a largely entertaining affair with quite a few party tracks as well as a couple of soft songs that would go a long way." Rajiv Vijayakar of Bollywood Hungama assigned two-and-a-half out of five, stating "The music is completely heterogeneous and partly unoriginal, so the better songs will be dependent on how the film fares." Bryan Durham of The Times of India assigned three-and-a-half out of five stars and wrote "t's meant to be played loud, and is apt if you are the type that enjoys club-climbing tracks and songs that have the potential to be party perennials. Equally interesting are the lyrics, high-strung, situational, self-obsessed, quirky yet not entirely putting-off." DJ Munks of BizAsia Live rated 7 out of 10 and summarized "The OST lacks innovation but that does not make a lot of difference when you have decently well done songs that simply sound good and deliver a good melody to the ears." Karthik Srinivasan of Milliblog described it as a "largely insignficant soundtrack."

== Track listing ==
Boss (Original Motion Picture Soundtrack) track listing
No.	Title	Lyrics	Music	Singer(s)	Length
1.	"Boss" (Title Track)	Kumaar	Meet Bros Anjjan, Yo Yo Honey Singh	Meet Bros Anjjan, Ikka Singh (rap)	4:48
2.	"Hum Na Tode"	Kumaar	P. A. Deepak	Vishal Dadlani	4:32
3.	"Pitah Se Hai Naam Tera"	Kumaar	Meet Bros Anjjan	Sonu Nigam, Meet Bros Anjjan, Sanjay Misra (alap)	5:12
4.	"Party All Night"	Sahil Kaushal	Yo Yo Honey Singh	Yo Yo Honey Singh	4:44
5.	"Har Kisi Ko" (Solo)	Manoj Yadav	Chirantan Bhatt	Nikhil D'Souza	5:06
6.	"Boss Entry" (Theme)	Kumaar	Meet Bros Anjjan	Meet Bros Anjjan, Sonu Kakkar, Khushboo Grewal	3:25
7.	"Har Kisi Ko" (Duet)	Manoj Yadav	Chirantan Bhatt	Arijit Singh, Neeti Mohan	5:39
8.	"Boss" (Remix by DJ Khushi)	Kumaar	Meet Bros Anjjan, Yo Yo Honey Singh	Meet Bros Anjjan, Yo Yo Honey Singh (rap)	4:08
9.	"Boss Ganpati" (Mix)	Kumaar	Meet Bros Anjjan	Meet Bros Anjjan	2:11
Total length:					39:45

== Accolades ==
Accolades for Boss (Original Motion Picture Soundtrack)
Award	Date of ceremony	Category	Recipient(s) and nominee(s)	Result	Ref.
Global Indian Music Academy Awards	20 January 2014	Best Music Debut	P. A. Deepak – ("Hum Na Tode")	Nominated	
Global Indian Music Academy Awards	20 January 2014	Best Engineer – Film Album	Eric Pillai – ("Boss")	Nominated	
Mirchi Music Awards	27 February 2015	Upcoming Music Composer of The Year	P. A. Deepak – ("Hum Na Tode")	Nominated	
Mirchi Music Awards	27 February 2015	Song Recording and Engineering of the Year	Eric Pillai – ("Har Kisi Ko")	Nominated	
