= Raavanan (soundtrack) =

2010 soundtrack album to Raavanan by A. R. Rahman

Soundtrack album by A. R. Rahman
- Released: 9 May 2010
- Recorded: 2009–2010
- Studios: Panchathan Record Inn and AM Studios, Chennai
- Genre: Feature film soundtrack
- Length: 30:02
- Label: Sony Music India
- Producer: A.R. Rahman

A. R. Rahman chronology
| Ye Maaya Chesave (2010) | Raavan / Raavanan (2010) | Puli (2010) |

Raavanan is the soundtrack album composed by A. R. Rahman, who accompanied for the music and background score for the 2010 Indian Tamil film of the same name, written and directed by Mani Ratnam. It Stars Prithviraj Sukumaran, Vikram and Aishwarya Rai Bachchan in lead roles. Abhishek Bachchan reprise Vikram's role in hindi version. The film marks Rahman's second collaboration with actor Vikram after Pudhiya Mannargal (1994) and First collaboration with Prithviraj Sukumaran. The soundtrack album was released by Sony Music India on 9 May 2010.

The soundtrack features six songs with lyrics penned by Vairamuthu, except for the song "Veera", which was penned by Mani Ratnam himself. The same soundtrack was used for the Hindi version of the film, titled Raavan, and the dubbed Telugu version of the film Villain, with the lyrics for the former was penned by Gulzar and the latter was penned by Veturi, which is his last work before his death in May 2010. While the audio rights of both Tamil and dubbed Telugu version was released by Sony Music, the Hindi version was released by T-Series.

While the album has six songs in total, five additional songs, which were featured in the movie was released as a collector's edition special pack on 10 November 2010. One of these tracks "Naan Varuvaen" was later released as a music video titled Changing Seasons. A. R. Rahman himself wrote the lyrics for this track and made an impromptu performance during the audio launch. The choreography of the songs were done by Ganesh Acharya, Brinda, Shobhana and Astad Deboo. The soundtrack is especially noted for the use of rich instruments, Indian as well as Middle Eastern. Several new singers were introduced through this film.

== Track listing ==
=== Tamil version ===
All lyrics are written by Vairamuthu.

| No. | Title | Singer(s) | Length |
|---|---|---|---|
| 1. | "Veera" (co-writer: Mani Ratnam) | Vijay Prakash, Mustafa Kutoane, Keerthi Sagathia, A. R. Rahman | 3:15 |
| 2. | "Usure Pogudhey" | Karthik, Mohammad Irfan Ali | 6:04 |
| 3. | "Kodu Poatta" | A. R. Rahman, Benny Dayal | 4:58 |
| 4. | "Kalvare" | Shreya Ghoshal | 4:11 |
| 5. | "Kaattu Sirukki" | Shankar Mahadevan, Anuradha Sriram | 5:54 |
| 6. | "Keda Kari" | Benny Dayal, Bhakkiyaraj, A. R. Reihana, Tanvi Shah, Mili Nair, SuVi, Chorus | 5:11 |
| 7. | "Naan Varuvaen" (co-writer: A. R. Rahman) | A. R. Rahman, Jali Fily Cissokho | 4:47 |

Collector's edition

| No. | Title | Singer(s) | Length |
|---|---|---|---|
| 8. | "Lament of The Leaves" | Bruno Conn | 2:45 |
| 9. | "Restless Mystic" (Instrumental) | Seenu | 1:19 |
| 10. | "Yaaro Yevalo" | Chinnaponnu, Sangeetha | 3:18 |
| 11. | "Kalingathu Bharani" | The Chennai Strings Orchestra | 2:57 |

=== Telugu version ===
All lyrics are written by Veturi.

| No. | Title | Singer(s) | Length |
|---|---|---|---|
| 1. | "Veera" | Vijay Prakash, Mustafa Kutoane, Keerthi Sagathia, A. R. Rahman | 3:15 |
| 2. | "Usure Poyene" | Karthik, Mohammad Irfan Ali | 6:04 |
| 3. | "Kullu Pudithe" | Devi Sri Prasad, Benny Dayal | 4:58 |
| 4. | "Kaavule" | Ankitha | 4:11 |
| 5. | "Kaanala Chilaka" | Anuradha Sriram, Naresh Iyer | 5:54 |
| 6. | "Gudaa Gudaa" | Bhagyaraj, Tanvi Shah, Suvi, Shubha, Naresh Iyer, Sangeetha | 5:11 |

== Reception ==
Professional ratings
Review scores
| Source | Rating |
|---|---|
| Music Aloud | 8.5/10 stars |
| Behindwoods | 3.5/5 stars |
| Rediff | 3.5/5 stars |

The soundtrack for the movie has received positive reviews, with most reviewers hailing the album to be one of Rahman's best recent works, though it did not win any awards for the year. Ironically, most of the music awards were won by the soundtrack of another Tamil film, Vinnaithaandi Varuvaayaa, which was also composed by Rahman. Karthik of Milliblog praised the renditioning of "Kalvare" by Shreya Ghoshal and stated that "Keda Kari" was "a fantastic effort". Music Aloud gave 8.5/10 to the album stating "Raavanan still makes for a great listen. It is, after all, a Rahman composition!" Behindwoods gave 3.5 out of 5 and summarised "The trilingual aspect of this movie seems to have steered Rahman into expressing himself a tad cautiously as far as Carnatic ragas are concerned. Nevertheless, this is a brisk and riveting album. The percussive aspect certainly deserves applause because of its muted nature. Though Karthik’s song looms large, all songs have the possibility of hitting the charts." Rediff gave the same rating and summarised "The songs are geared more towards specific situations, emotions and characters; undoubtedly, their appeal is bound to the movie itself. Nevertheless, the range and depth of the numbers do impress you on repeated listens. A couple of numbers, you feel, don't scale the heights of brilliance; the transmutation from Hindi to Thamizh is obvious, and rather jarring at moments. But Rahman's brilliance in instrumental arrangement, choice of vocals and Vairamuthu's lyrics make up for it."

== Album credits ==
Credits adapted from A. R. Rahman's official website.

=== Personnel ===
Instruments

- Guitar - P. A. Deepak
- Flute - Naveen Kumar
- Sitar - Asad Khan
- Oud - Seenu, P. A. Deepak
- Shehnai - S. Ballesh, Krishna Ballesh
- Nadaswaram - Natarajan
- Percussions - T. Raja, Kumar, Vedachalam, Neelakandan, Lakshminarayanan, Chinna Prasad
- Strings - Chennai Strings Orchestra (conducted by V.J. Srinivasamurthy)

Backing vocals

Dr. Narayanan, Naresh Iyer, M. Kuldeep, Swetha Mohan, Gopika Purnima, Subhiksha, Sri Madhumita, SuVi, Mili Nair, Suzanne D'Mello, Sujatha Majumdar, Nikitha Nigam, Dilshad Shaikh, R. N. Iyer, Arun Ingle, Chintamani Sohoni, Gowtham Bharadwaj

Additional vocal supervisor

Srinivas Doraisamy

=== Sound Engineers ===
Panchathan Record Inn, Chennai - T. R. Krishna Chetan, Hentry Kuruvilla, Vivianne Chaix, Suresh Perumal, Srinidhi Venkatesh, P. A. Deepak

AM Studios, Chennai - S. Sivakumar, Kannan Ganpat, Pradeep

=== Production ===
- Mixed by - P. A. Deepak, K.J. Singh
- Mastered by - S. Sivakumar
- Music Production Assistant - T. R. Krishna Chetan
- Additional Programming - T. R. Krishna Chetan, P. A. Deepak, Hentry Kuruvilla, Ranjith Barot
- Musician's co-ordinator - Noell James, T. M. Faizuddin
- Musicians fixer - N. Samidurai
