= Changing Seasons =

Changing Seasons may refer to:

- Changing Seasons (music video) by A.R. Rahman in Hindi and Tamil versions
- Changing Seasons, 1980 jazz album by violinist Billy Bang
- Changing Seasons, 2002 jazz album by New Zealand pianist Mike Nock
- Changing Seasons (Phil Dwyer album), 2011
