= Nazim Hussain =

Indian tabla player

Ustad Nazim Hussain
- Born: Nazim Bhai, Naazimji, NazimSaheb; 1 June 1963 (age 62)
- Origin: Varanasi, Uttar Pradesh, India
- Genres: Hindustani classical music
- Occupation: Musician
- Instrument: Tabla
- Website: https://www.tansenacademy.com

Ustad Nazim Hussain (born June 1, 1963) is an Indian tabla player and popularly known as Ustad Nazim Hussain Bismillah Khan and also called as Nazim Bhai. He is the youngest son of shehnai master Ustad Bismillah Khan, whom he accompanied as well. Nazim Hussain has accompanied his father disciples Pandit Dr. S. Ballesh and Dr. Krishna Ballesh in several concerts on tabla

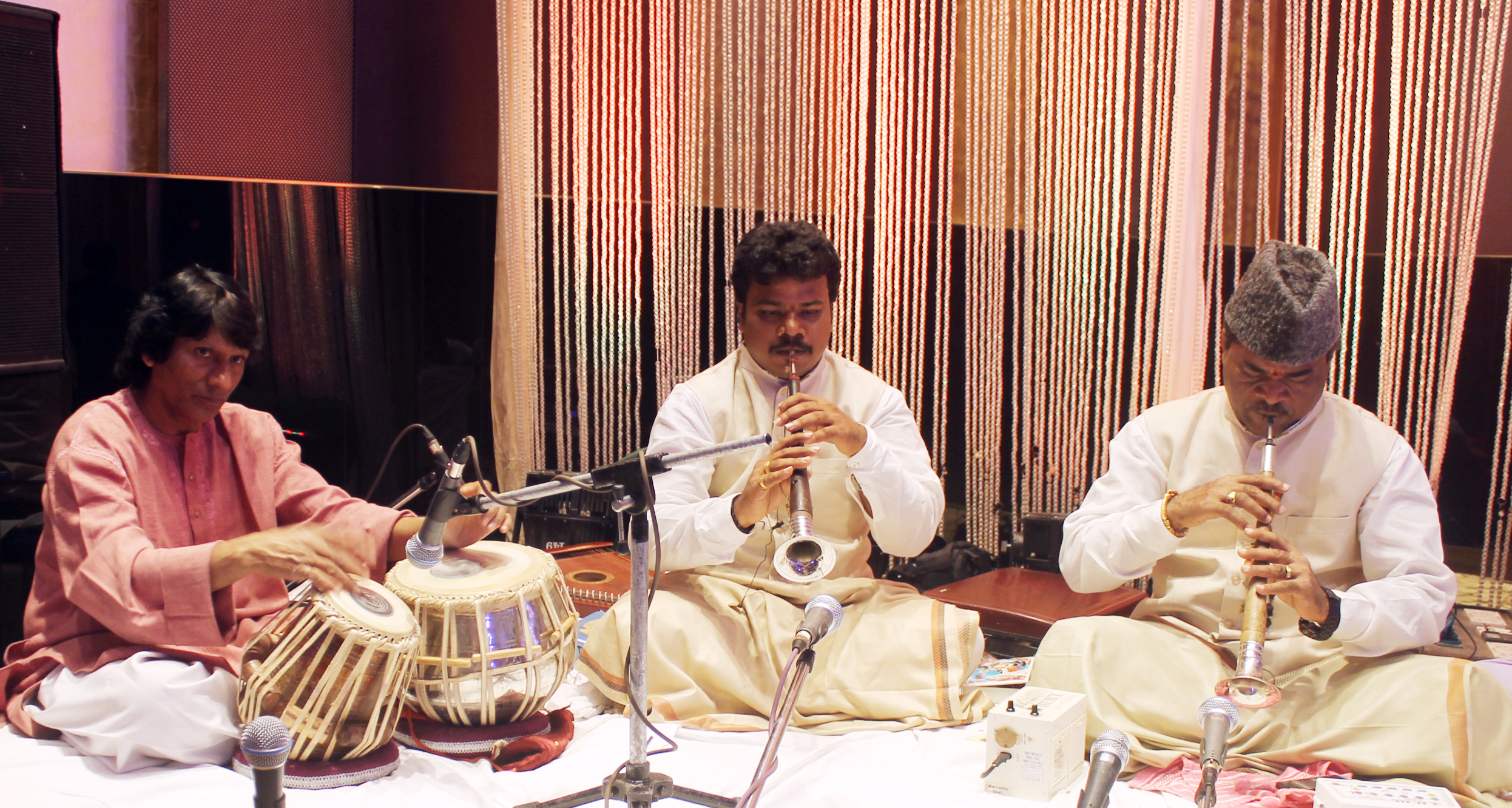
Ustad Nazim Hussain accompanying Shehnai Maestro Kalaimamani Pandit Dr. S. Ballesh and Kalaimamani Dr. Krishna Ballesh

== Career ==
Nazim gave his first concert in chennai at age sixteen in a Music conference accompanying his father along with performed by Ustad Bade Gulam Ali Khan and Ustad Vilayat Khan, Nazim is one of the Chief Patrons along Maestro Ilaiyaraaja and A.R. Rahman of Tansen Academy Of Music, founded by Ballesh and his son Krishna Ballesh, In 2005 he performed a tribute concert in Chennai organized by Tansen Academy of Music. He is teaching Guru of Tabla in the academy.

== Awards ==
Nazim was awarded with Yash Bharati Award, the highest civilian award conferred by Uttar Pradesh Chief Minister, in 2017
