= Raavan (soundtrack) =

2010 soundtrack album to Raavan by A. R. Rahman

- Soundtrack album cover

Soundtrack album by A. R. Rahman
- Released: 24 April 2010
- Recorded: 2009–2010
- Studio: Panchathan Record Inn and A.M. Studios, Chennai
- Genre: Feature film soundtrack
- Length: 30:02
- Label: T-Series
- Producer: A. R. Rahman

A. R. Rahman chronology
Ye Maaya Chesave (2010)	Raavan / Raavanan (2010)	Puli (2010)

Raavan is the soundtrack composed by A. R. Rahman, who accompanied for the music and background score for the 2010 Hindi film of the same name, directed by Mani Ratnam. It stars Vikram, Aishwarya Rai Bachchan, Abhishek Bacchan in the lead roles. In Tamil Version Prithviraj Sukumaran reprise Vikram's role. It was released on 24 April 2010, by the label T-Series. The soundtrack features six songs, with four additional tracks included in the film were released later; the lyrics being penned by Gulzar. The same soundtrack was used for the Tamil version of the film, titled Raavanan as well as the Telugu dubbed version, titled Villain.

== Development ==
The soundtrack is especially noted for the use of rich instruments, Indian as well as Middle Eastern. Several new singers are introduced through this film. Rahman as usual, brought some experimental tracks like "Beera Beera" and "Thok De Killi". There is a folk song "Kata Kata", a kind of Sufi song "Ranjha Ranjha" as well as melodies like "Behene De" and "Khilli Re" in the soundtrack. The choreography of the songs by Ganesh Acharya, Brinda, Shobhana and Astad Deboo is also considered the highlight of the songs.

The album kicks off with "Beera Beera", that was premiered on the official teaser of the film. It was sung by Vijay Prakash and it begins with an African chant that was sung by Mustafa Kutoane. It describes the lead character played by Abhishek Bachchan. This track was picturised on the introduction scene of Bachchan. The African chant explains the wild character of him. The song continues throughout the opening credits.

"Behene De", sung by Karthik and Mohammed Irfan was regarded as the highlight of the album by many reviewers. The song, which takes many fascinating turns mid way, was the first completely picturised song in the film. Its shot on the beauties of Athirapally waterfalls in Kerala and features Abhishek Bachchan and Aishwarya Rai. The song is widely regarded as the biggest song in Karthik's musical career. He recorded the song in 2009 October from Rahman's Chennai studio and has performed it live in many programmes.

The next track "Thok De Killi" is sung by one of Rahman's most trusted singers Sukhwinder Singh and is a fast and peppy number. Guitar is the major instrument used and it ends in a frenzy and uses Arabic esque phrases here and there. The song is picturised as a war dance by Abhishek Bachchan and his gang (consisting of Ravi Kishan, Ajay Gehi etc.). Aishwarya Rai is also featured in the music video, as watching Beera dance from a distance.

"Ranjha Ranjha" is a kind of Sufi song, with a little folk instrumentation and is sung by Javed Ali and Rekha Bhardwaj, who is noted for the rendering of another folk song "Genda Phool" from Delhi-6 by Rahman. The lyrics of the opening lines of the song is adapted from Sufi Saint and Poet Baba Bulleh Shah's "Ranjha Ranjha Kardi". The song is used in the background of the movie only.

"Khili Re" is a romantic song and is sung by Reena Bhardwaj, who was replaced by Shreya Ghoshal in the Tamil version. Its instrumentation is based on flute and sitar. Picturised on Aishwarya Rai and Vikram from Kolkata, the alap portion of this song features a classical dance performance by Aishwarya Rai. The song was choreographed by well known actress and dancer Shobhana.

"Kata Kata" is a situational song that is rich in percussions and was shot as a wedding song. The song was based on traditional Indian music and Middle Eastern music, and had oud and shehnai are used in the interludes. This song was shot with 1000 dancers in Orchha, Madhya Pradesh. "A huge set was created in Orchha to shoot this song which took four days to wrap up and has been choreographed by Ganesh Acharya," says a Unit hand. This song may seem a little similar in picturisation and mood to "Rukmani Rukmani" (from Roja), both being wedding songs involving a group of singers, but if "Rukmani Rukmani" was a mischievous set-up for the nuptial night, this one's sung like a warning, but with equal amount of revelry and fanfare. "Kata Kata" is reportedly the most lavish song that Mani Ratnam has ever shot in his career.

The only full song out of the four additional tracks "Jaare Ud Jaare" was performed by Rahman. According to Rahman, "The song was a very last minute addition. I saw the movie and felt like adding a song to a particular situation in the film. The lyrics of the song were ready for a while however I had to yet compose the tune." It was composed and recorded by Rahman in his Mumbai studio within a few hours. The song starts in the movie during the acclaimed climax scene of the movie and continues throughout the end-credits.

== Release ==
As Raavan became a major anticipated project, following the success of Rahman's previous album, several false rumours about the soundtrack of the film were disseminated to websites and magazines. Many songs claimed to be songs from Raavan, like "Pairon Pe Jannat Hain", "Kaadhale" etc. and another set of fake track lists were spread through internet. The audio release was scheduled in March 2010, but since the release date of the film was changed, the audio release was changed to April last week. The track list was officially published on 3 May 2010 and the music was launched officially on 7 May 2010 by Aishwarya Rai and Abhishek Bachchan. However, CDs were available in some stores on 6 May 2010 itself.

The soundtrack features 6 songs composed by A. R. Rahman with lyrics penned by Gulzar. During the audio release, an additional track was performed by Rahman, titled "Jaare Ud Jaare", which was not included in the CD. The song was cited to be an "instant composition" by Rahman, "The night before the launch, Rahman closeted himself in his Mumbai studio and worked through the night to compose the song", the source adds. This song is believed to be included in the later stages. The soundtrack also features three more additional songs that were featured in the movie. However the official track list has only 6 songs.

== Reception ==
Professional ratings
Review scores
Source	Rating
Bollywood Hungama	4/5 stars
Rediff	4/5 stars
The Hindustan Times	4/4 stars
IBN Live	4/5 stars

The soundtrack for the movie has received positive reviews, with most reviewers hailing the album to be one of Rahman's best recent works. The Hindu said, "Raavan is further proof that A.R. Rahman always saves some of his best stuff for old friend Mani Ratnam. There's no escaping Raavan. Or Rahman. They will get you." According to The Times of India, Raavan is an interesting audio track, although Rahman's earlier associations with Mani Ratnam remain unforgettable. A review on Bollywood Hungama said, "There are number of gems in the album, most notably being "Ranjha Ranjha", "Beera Beera" and "Thok De Killi". Go for it, this one is not to be missed as it has Rahman coming up with one of his best soundtracks in recent times." A review by the Hindustan Times said, The trio (Rahman, Gulzar and Mani) has brought out a lethal combination presenting a soundtrack that is fresh, high on energy and in tune with the soul of the movie. According to Rediff's Sukanya Verma, "A. R. Rahman stays true to the element of Ratnam's vision as there's never any attempt to show off or introduce unnecessary elements. The outcome is exquisite. Or should I say expected." A review by NDTV said, "The album is a musical treat and impresses thoroughly. When Rahman teams up with Gulzar and Mani Ratnam, the result is pure magic."

== Track listing ==
=== Hindi version ===
All lyrics are written by Gulzar.

No.	Title	Singer(s)	Length
1.	"Beera Beera"	Vijay Prakash, Mustafa Kutoane, Keerthi Sagathia	03:15
2.	"Behene De"	Karthik, Mohammad Irfan Ali	06:04
3.	"Thok De Killi"	Sukhwinder Singh, Am'nico	04:58
4.	"Khilli Re"	Reena Bhardwaj	04:11
5.	"Ranjha Ranjha"	Javed Ali, Rekha Bhardwaj, Anuradha Sriram	05:54
6.	"Kata Kata"	Ila Arun, Sapna Awasthi, Kunal Ganjawala	05:11

Additional tracks

No.	Title	Singer(s)	Length
7.	"Jaare Ud Jaare"	A. R. Rahman, Jali Fily Cissokho	04:59
8.	"Yudh Yudh Yudh"	Naresh Iyer, Rahul Nambiar, Dr. Narayan, Haricharan	03:28
9.	"Kora"	Jali Fily Cissokho	01:18
10.	"Mayama" (Bulgarian Vox)	Tsvetanka Vanmezova	02:46

== Album credits ==
Credits adapted from A. R. Rahman's official website.

=== Personnel ===
Instruments

- Guitar - P. A. Deepak
- Flute - Naveen Kumar
- Sitar - Asad Khan
- Oud - Seenu, P. A. Deepak
- Shehnai - S. Ballesh, Krishna Ballesh
- Nadaswaram - Natarajan
- Percussions - T. Raja, Kumar, Vedachalam, Neelakandan, Lakshminarayanan, Chinna Prasad
- Strings - Chennai Strings Orchestra (conducted by V.J. Srinivasamurthy)

Backing vocals

Dr. Narayanan, Naresh Iyer, M. Kuldeep, Swetha Mohan, Gopika Purnima, Subhiksha, Sri Madhumita, SuVi, Mili Nair, Suzanne D'Mello, Sujatha Majumdar, Nikitha Nigam, Dilshad Shaikh, R. N. Iyer, Arun Ingle, Chintamani Sohoni, Gowtham Bharadwaj

Additional vocal supervisor

Srinivas Doraisamy

=== Sound Engineers ===
Panchathan Record Inn, Chennai - T. R. Krishna Chetan, Hentry Kuruvilla, Vivianne Chaix, Suresh Perumal, Srinidhi Venkatesh, P. A. Deepak

AM Studios, Chennai - S. Sivakumar, Kannan Ganpat, Pradeep

=== Production ===
- Mixed by - P. A. Deepak, K.J. Singh
- Mastered by - S. Sivakumar
- Music Production Assistant - T. R. Krishna Chetan
- Additional Programming - T. R. Krishna Chetan, P. A. Deepak, Hentry Kuruvilla, Ranjith Barot
- Musician's co-ordinator - Noell James, T. M. Faizuddin
- Musicians fixer - N. Samidurai
