= P. A. Deepak =

Indian musician

Adrushta Deepak Pallikonda
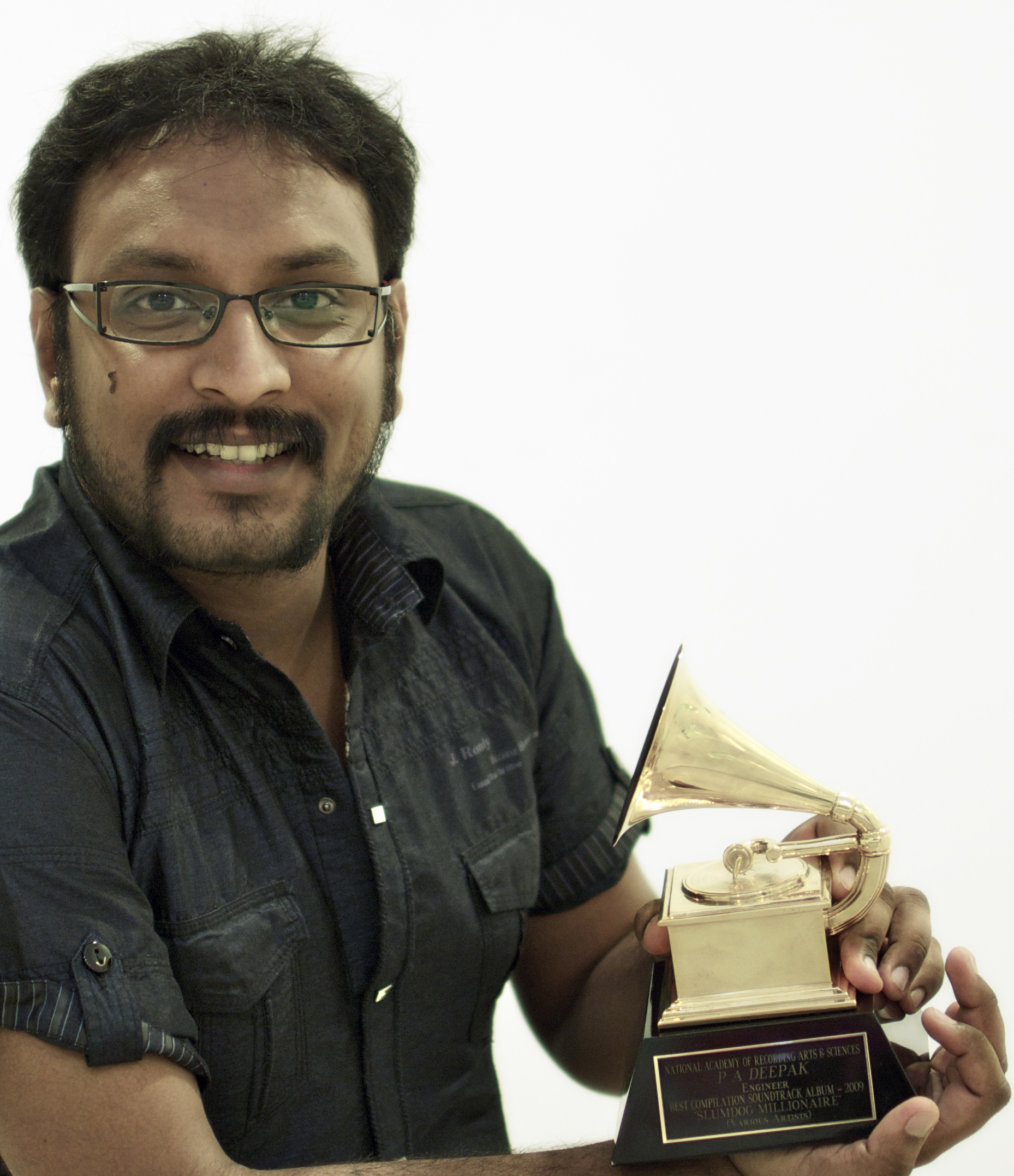
- Born: 10 January 1982 (age 44)
- Occupations: Mix engineer and record producer
- Spouse: Ramani
- Children: 2

P.A.Deepak (Adrushta Deepak Pallikonda) is a mix engineer and record producer. He is the winner of two Grammy Awards and a Grammy Certificate of Honor, including the 2010 Grammy Award for the "Best Compilation Soundtrack for Visual Media" for the movie Slumdog Millionaire.

Deepak also won the Grammy for his work as mixer and engineer on Divine Tides, which won the Best New Age Album at the 64th Grammys, as well as received a Certificate Of Honour in the year 2015 from The Recording Academy in recognition of his participation as Surround Mix Engineer on the Grammy Award Winning recording Winds of Samsara in the category Grammy Award for Best New Age Album of 57th Annual Grammy Awards.

== Awards and recognition ==
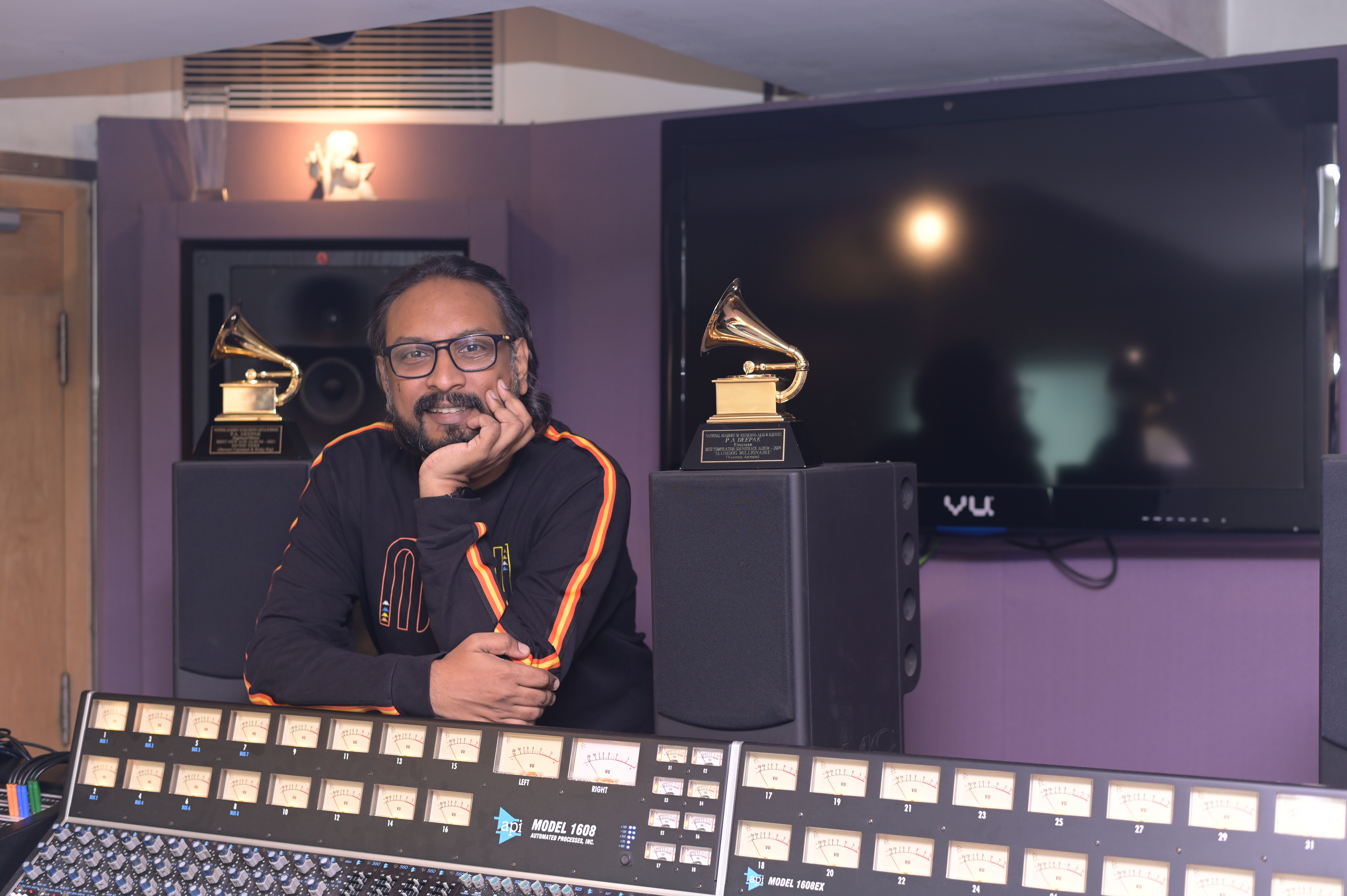
P.A. Deepak with his Grammy Awards for Slumdog Millionaire (2010) and Divine Tides (2022)

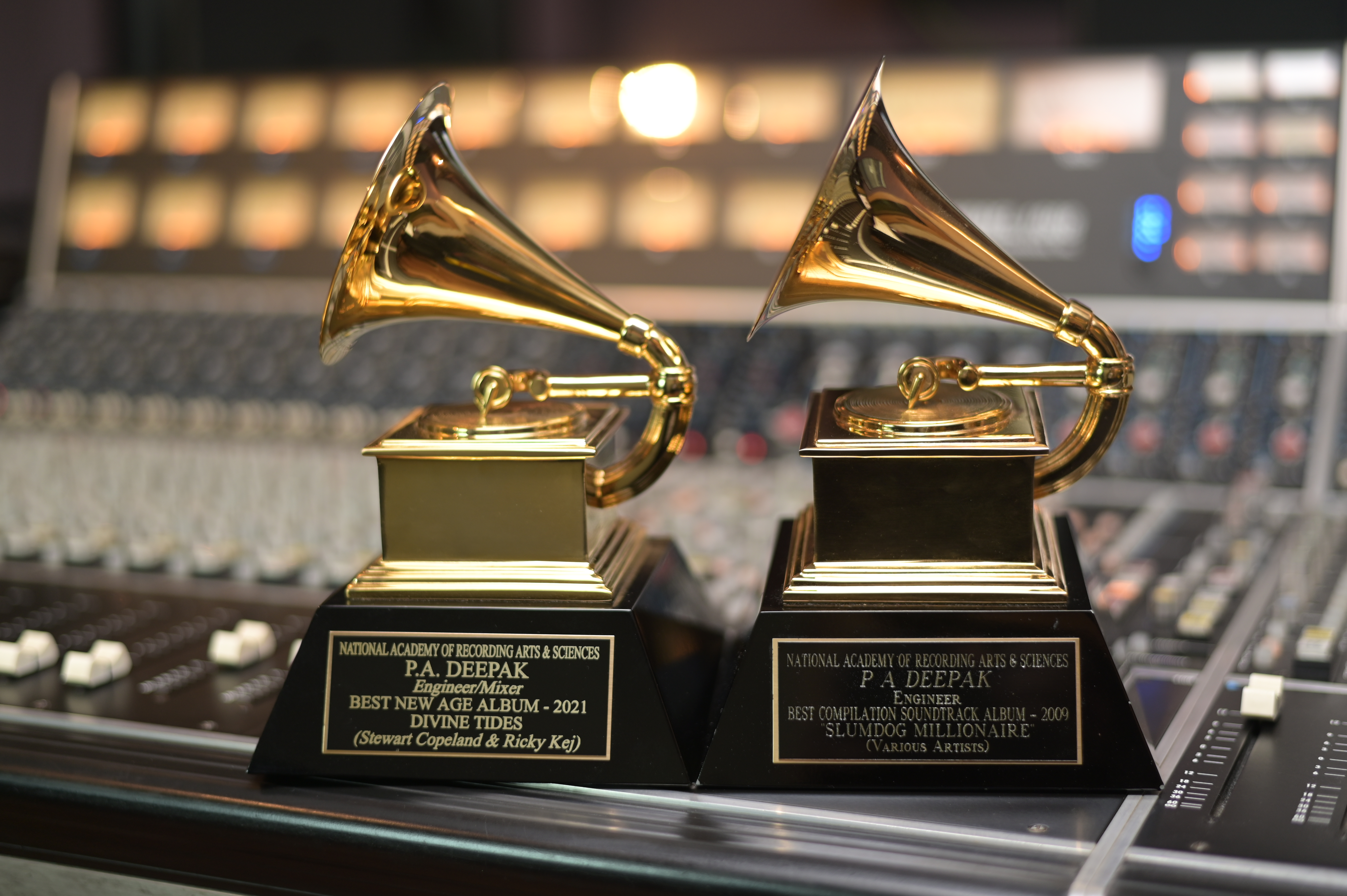
P.A. Deepak’s Grammy Awards for Slumdog Millionaire (2010) and Divine Tides (2022), photographed at In The Mix studio

Year	Award/Recognition	Category	Work	Role(s)
2022	Grammy Awards	Best New Age Album	Divine Tides	Recording engineer; Mixing engineer; Mastering engineer
2015	Grammy Awards	Recognition of participation (associated with Best New Age Album)	Winds of Samsara	Surround mix engineer
2012	Chevrolet Star GiMA Awards	Best Engineer	Rockstar	—
2011	Vijay Music Awards	Best Sound Mixing	Enthiran	—
2010	Grammy Awards	Best Compilation Soundtrack for Visual Media	Slumdog Millionaire	Recording engineer; Mixing engineer; Music producer
2009	Airtel Mirchi Music Award	Best Song Mixing & Engineering	Delhi-6	—
2005	AV MAX Award	Best Recording Engineer	Paheli	—

== Career ==
Deepak started his career as a guitarist and later became a recording engineer. Apart from being a full-time mix engineer, he plays various string instruments and does music programming out of passion & interest.

He is currently collaborating with various renowned artists and performing as a mix engineer & music producer.

== His works ==
As a musician, he played guitar and oud for the movie Raavan. He has done music programming for various songs and of which the Blue Theme was described as a Killer Mix.

Deepak worked as a music composer for the film Boss in which, the single Hum Na Tode, is an adapted track of the popular Tamil song composed by Vidyasagar, Appadi Podu. This track – boasted of ferocious and aggressive vocals by Vishal Dadlani, adapted by P. A. Deepak and lyrics by Kumaar which consolidated the album's positive impact on its audiences.

Deepak mixed the Deluxe Edition of 'Winds of Samsara' in 5.1 Blu-ray HD Surround Sound that won the 57th Grammy Award for Best New Age Album. 'Winds of Samsara' was the first collaboration between award-winning South African flautist Wouter Kellerman and award-winning Indian Composer/Producer/Artist Ricky Kej. The Album headed to the Number 1 spot on the Billboard New Age Charts.

The Recording Academy, previously known as 'NARAS' or National Academy of Recording Arts & Sciences, presented a Certificate Of Honour to Deepak in recognition of his participation as Surround Mix Engineer on the Grammy Award Winning recording 'Winds of Samsara' in the category of Grammy Award for Best New Age Album of 57th Annual Grammy Awards in the year 2015.

The Recording Academy feted Deepak in appreciation and recognition of 15 years of membership with the academy and for supporting the academy's mission to improve the environment for music and the lives of all members of their community in the year 2017.

Deepak has been recently honoured with Life Membership of International Film and Television Club of AAFT by Dr. Sandeep Marwah Chancellor of AAFT University on his visit to Noida Film City.

== Personal life ==
Deepak is married to Ramani. They have two sons.

== Discography ==
This is a partial discography

Year	Album	Language	Genre	Role	Music composer(s)
2020	Dil Bechara	Hindi & English	Feature Film	Sound Mixing for the songs (Track 1,2): Dil Bechara & Taare Ginn	A.R. Rahman
2020	Master	Tamil	Feature Film	Additional Mixing	Anirudh Ravichander
2020	Soorarai Pottru	Tamil	Feature Film	Additional Mixing	G.V. Prakash Kumar
2019	Nuvvu Thopu Raa	Telugu	Feature Film	Additional Composer	Suresh Bobbili
2015	I	Tamil	Feature Film	Mixing & Additional Programming for the song Merasalaayiten (Remix)	A.R. Rahman
2014	Winds of Samsara	English	Studio Album	Surround Mix for the Deluxe Edition	Ricky Kej, Wouter Kellerman
2014	Lingaa	Telugu & Tamil	Feature Film	Additional programming for the song "Mona Gasolina", Surround Mixing for Score, Songs & Album	A.R. Rahman
2015	O Kadhal Kanmani	Tamil	Feature Film	Additional Music Programming for the songs Kaara Aattaakkaara & Aye Sinamika, Song Mixer	A.R. Rahman
2019	Sarvam Thaala Mayam	Telugu & Tamil	Feature Film	Mixing	A.R. Rahman
2014	Gulaab Gang	Hindi	Feature Film	Co-Music Composer, Mastering & Mix Engineer	Soumik Sen
2013	Boss	Hindi	Feature Film	Music Composer	P.A.Deepak
2018	Sarkar	Tamil & Telugu	Feature Film	Additional Programming, Mixing for the songs "Simtaangaran" & "Top Tucker"	A.R. Rahman
2010	Jhootha Hi Sahi	Hindi	Feature Film	Sound Engineer	A.R. Rahman
2010	Enthiran	Tamil	Feature Film	Sound Engineer, Mixing, Programming	A.R. Rahman
2009	Delhi-6	Hindi	Feature Film	Sound Engineer, Mixing, Programming	A.R. Rahman
2010	Semmozhiyaana Thamizh Mozhiyaam	Tamil	Feature Film	Mixing	A.R. Rahman
2010	Raavanan / Raavan	Tamil & Hindi	Feature Film	Musician, Sound Engineer, Mixing, Programming	A.R. Rahman
2012	Kadal	Tamil	Feature Film	Programming & Mix (Track: "Magudi")	A.R. Rahman
2009	Blue	Hindi	Feature Film	Sound Engineer, Mixing, Additional Programming	A.R. Rahman
2010	Puli	Telugu	Feature Film	Sound Engineer, Mixing, Additional Programming	A.R. Rahman
2012	Ekk Deewana Tha	Hindi	Feature Film	Sound Engineer, Mixing, Additional Programming	A.R. Rahman
2011	Rockstar	Hindi	Feature Film	Sound Engineer, Mixing, Additional Programming	A.R. Rahman
2009	Jai Ho! ( You are my Destiny)	English	Single Album	Sound Engineer	A.R. Rahman
2012	Jab Tak Hai Jaan	Hindi	Feature Film	Sound Engineer	A.R. Rahman
2012	Classic Incantations	English	Live Album	Sound Engineer	A.R. Rahman
2011	127 Hours	English	Feature Film	Sound Engineer, Mixing, Additional Programming	A.R. Rahman
2010	Vinnaithaandi Varuvaayaa	Tamil	Feature Film	Sound Engineer, Mixing, Additional Programming	A.R. Rahman
2008	Ghajini	Hindi	Feature Film	Additional Programming	A.R. Rahman
2008	Yuvvraaj	Hindi	Feature Film	Sound Engineer, Additional Programming	A.R. Rahman
2008	Jaane Tu Ya Jaane Na	Hindi	Feature Film	Sound Engineer, Additional Programming	A.R. Rahman
2008	Jodhaa Akbar	Hindi	Feature Film	Recording Engineer	A.R. Rahman
2008	Connections	Hindi	Compilation Album & Studio Album	Additional Programming for Track "Kural"	A.R. Rahman
