= Classic Incantations: The German Film Orchestra Babelsberg performs A.R. Rahman =

Live album by A.R. Rahman
- Released: July 2012
- Recorded: December 2011–June 2012; Panchathan Record Inn and AM Studios, Chennai; Panchathan Hollywood Studio, Los Angeles; YRF Studios, Mumbai
- Genre: Orchestral
- Length: 27:06
- Languages: English; French
- Labels: K M Musiq; T-Series; Magnasound

A.R. Rahman chronology
L.A. Philharmonic Orchestra (Live) (2011)	Classic Incantations: The German Film Orchestra Babelsberg performs A.R. Rahman (2012)

Classic Incantations: The German Film Orchestra Babelsberg performs A.R. Rahman is a studio recording of the five-city concert tour in India of January 2012. The musical showcased over a hundred orchestral musicians as they performed live in India as part of the collaborative celebration titled Germany and India 2011-2011: Infinite Opportunities which marked celebration of 60 years of diplomatic ties between the two countries.

The concert tour also coincided with the celebration of the centenary year of studio of German Film Orchestra Babelsberg. The concert made its debut in Mumbai on 20 January 2012 and subsequently traveled to Delhi, Kolkata, Chennai and Bengaluru. The musical alliance between the German Film Orchestra Babelsberg and students of the KM Music Conservatory, Chennai, performed orchestral sweeps composed by A.R. Rahman for Roja, Swades, The Rising: Ballad of Mangal Pandey, Lord of the Rings, Passage, Slumdog Millionaire. Studio recordings of these pieces, performed in the concert are compiled in this album. Apart from these, scores from the film Elizabeth: The Golden Age, 127 Hours, Bombay, Warriors of Heaven and Earth were also performed at the concert.

== Development ==
On 23 September 2011, it was announced that as a part 60 years of diplomatic relations between Germany and India there would be a collaboration between A.R. Rahman and the German Film Orchestra, Babelsberg who will perform selective compositions by A.R. Rahman live in concert. The orchestra was directed by Klaus Peter Beyer. He stated that when he had visited India in 2010, he carried back home the recordings of their first rehearsals that were few selected pieces of A.R. Rahman's music. He added that the concert would also have over a hundred members of the German film Orchestra together performing with choir members from Rahman's KM Music Conservatory, soloists along with conductor Matt Dunkley. Dunkley claimed, "I think for myself and the orchestra this tour will be a journey in more than one way. Everybody tells me that your first visit to India is a life-changing event, so I'm looking forward to experiencing all that India has to offer. It will be fascinating too to see the reaction of an Indian audience exposed, some for the first time, to the glorious sound of a full symphony orchestra and classical choir performing some of maestro Rahman's beautiful orchestral film music. I feel very honoured to be part of this historic project." The lineup of performances would have the selective classical scores from A.R. Rahman's Roja, Bombay, Swades and Enthiran. In an interview with Times of India, Rahman quoted, "I am sure this will be a new experience to Indian score lovers. It will give them a great opportunity to experience and see how many people are involved in creating huge scores and create a thirst among the younger generation to become orchestral musicians."

== Tour schedules ==
The following were the schedules of the tour.

#	Date	City	Venue
1	20 January 2012	Mumbai	Jamshed Bhabha Theater, The National Centre of Performing Arts
2	22 January 2012	New Delhi	Siri Fort Auditorium
3	24 January 2012	Kolkata	Science City Auditorium
4	26 January 2012	Chennai	Sir Mutha Venkata Subba Rao Concert Hall
5	29 January 2012	Bengaluru	Tripuravasini, Palace Grounds

== Soundtrack ==
The scores for the songs that were selected to perform live were re-written. The orchestra played tunes, which were not the same as the original however the medley of songs was interwoven with the film's background score to create the orchestral impact. The concert recordings were released as an album, which features seven tracks. In July 2012, all the tracks were released on the label T-Series. They were simultaneously released on iTunes India with a bonus track "Cry of Rose" that was featured only in the iTunes version of the same album.

Standard track listing The track list was released on A.R. Rahman's official website in July 2012 itself. "Instrumental" in the track list depicts that the tracks are performed by the German Film Orchestra and KM Music Conservatory.

#	Track	Original Score	Singer(s)	Length (in mm:ss)
1	The Rising: Legacy	Mangal Pandey: The Rising	Instrumental	01:54
2	Swades Suite	Swades	Instrumental	05:02
3	Lothlorien	The Lord of the Rings	Instrumental; Solo Vocals:Arun Haridas Kamath, Kavita Baliga	04:04
4	Moi (Aria)	Passage	Instrumental; Solo Vocals:Kavita Baliga	05:16
5	The Waltz (Lux Aterna)	Passage	Instrumental; Solo Vocals:Kavita Baliga	03:20
6	Latika's Theme	Slumdog Millionaire	Instrumental	03:40
7	Mausam & Escape	Slumdog Millionaire	Instrumental	03:36

Bonus track (featured only in iTunes version of the album)

#	Track	Original Score	Singer(s)	Length (in mm:ss)
8	Cry of Rose (Music label: Magnasound)	Roja	Instrumental (Featuring: Navin Iyer as flautist, Asad Khan on Sitar)	06:24
