= Janbaaz =

1986 romantic action film by Feroz Khan

- Directed by: Feroz Khan
- Written by: K. K. Shukla
- Produced by: Feroz Khan
- Starring: Feroz Khan; Anil Kapoor; Dimple Kapadia; Sridevi; Shakti Kapoor
- Edited by: Feroz Khan
- Music by: Kalyanji Anandji
- Release date: 20 June 1986
- Running time: 182 minutes
- Country: India
- Language: Hindi
- Budget: ₹17 million
- Box office: ₹65 million

Janbaaz (lit. 'Daredevil') is a 1986 Indian action drama film, produced and directed by Feroz Khan, it stars Khan, Anil Kapoor and Dimple Kapadia. It is inspired by King Vidor's Duel in the Sun (1946; which is based on the 1944 novel of the same name by Niven Busch).

Sridevi appears in a special appearance opposite Khan. Capitalising on her stardom, Khan featured her in the song "Har Kisi Ko" which became a chart-topper. The film was a box office success. Kapadia's performance, with her chemistry and sex scene with co-star Anil Kapoor, became much discussed.

== Plot ==
Rana Vikram Singh lives in a huge farmhouse with his wife, Laxmi and has two sons, Rajesh, a police officer and Amar, a fun-loving playboy. Amar handles the family business and lives his life to the fullest, enjoying the company of women. Rajesh has gone through a traumatic experience of losing the girl he loved Seema, when she succumbed to drug addiction by Kingpin Teja and his son Raja. Teja and Raja had abducted Seema to extract their revenge on Rajesh, whose drug raids were causing them business losses. Teja kills Seema with an overdose, before Rajesh can trace his location and attack with the police force. Rajesh vows to fight this menace. Rajesh destroys the drug lab of Teja and Raja, but they had escaped him.

Raja murders Reshma's father to loot his estate. Raja had earlier duped Rai Sahab by beating him at the Darby (Raja had already bribed Rai Sahab's jockey to lose the race, in exchange for leaving his family alone. Rai Sahab lost Rs 15 Lakhs on the bet). Raja wanted to kill Rai Sahab as he and Teja want to use his wealth and estate to fund their drug business that is under attack from Rajesh. Raja also lusts after Reshma. Raja and Teja then cheat Rai Sahab at a cards poker game (they have observers who look at Rai Sahab's cards and relay the info to them to place bets accordingly). Rai Sahab bets his house and loses. Raja wants him to bet Reshma, which enrages Rai Sahab and he shoots at Raja (in the shoulder). Raja takes Rai Sahab out with a rifle and a grenade.

Amar is sleeping with Raja's sister and had met him in one of his drug clubs. Rajesh arrives at the club and arrests both Raja and Amar. Reshma goes to Rana's house as Rana's wife is her father's sister. Reshma's dad and mum didn't marry & hence she is a bastard. Reshma gets a lift from Amar, who lusts after Reshma. Reshma is surprised to learn that Amar is Laxmi's son. Reshma gets a job on the farm to pay her own way.

Amar continues to needle Reshma with his flirting on the farm. Reshma feeds beer to Amar's horse Macho, to exact her revenge. As a result, Macho misbehaves with Amar and Reshma makes fun of Amar. Eventually, Amar has sex with Reshma in a barn and then promises marriage to her. Reshma is elated and tells both Laxmi and Rajesh. But when Vikram confronts Amar, he denies any such thing. the evil Raja pursues them as Amar also be-fooled Raja's sister into sleeping with him. Amar finally ditches Reshma. Rajesh realises it and the two brothers have a fight. Vikram intervenes and announces that Reshma wanted to take advantage of Amar to stay at their home permanently. But Laxmi and Rajesh defend Reshma. Vikram agrees to let her stay in the house, but would not accept as his daughter-in-law. Raja was in the lockup when Reshma came to Rajesh and understands this brewing family feud and wants to take advantage of it.

Raja is bailed by his lawyers and plans with Teja to bring down Rajesh and his family. Raja reaches out to Amar and befriends him after being released from jail. Reshma makes Amar jealous by flirting with the farm manager Vikas. Amar kills the farm Manager & escapes his brother Rajesh (who wants to jail him), by going to Raja (who has befriended him). Meanwhile, Rajesh arrests Vikram for aiding and abetting a criminal. Amar meets Reshma in secret and admits that he loves her. He takes Reshma away to Raja's house. Raja and his sister wait anxiously for their heart-throbs. Reshma tells Amar that Raja is not a friend, but he is the enemy. Teja kills Raja's sister when she tries to save Amar.

Raja tries to sexually assault Reshma but Rajesh arrives to save them. Rajesh kills Teja and wounds Raja. But Raja kills Amar, who dies trying to save Reshma from Raja. Reshma is accepted by the Rana family as the widow of their dead son.

== Cast ==
- Feroz Khan as Rajesh
- Anil Kapoor as Amar Singh
- Dimple Kapadia as Reshma
- Rekha (guest appearance)
- Sridevi as Seema (guest appearance)
- Amrish Puri as Rana Vikram Singh
- Sushma Seth as Laxmi Singh
- Shakti Kapoor as Raja
- Raza Murad as Teja
- Puneet Issar as Rocky
- Dalip Tahil as Vikas
- Tej Sapru as John
- Barbie Wilde as Robotic Dancer
- Rajesh Vivek
- Aarti Gupta as Raja's sister, Amar's love interest

== Production ==
Anil Kapoor and Dimple replaced Sanjay Khan and Rekha who had originally been signed for the movie. Feroz Khan made use of the song and dance sequence "Pyaar Do Pyar Lo" picturised on Rekha for his shelved film Kasak.

== Soundtrack ==
The soundtrack was composed by Kalyanji-Anandji. The song "Tera Saath hai Kitna Pyara" by Kishore Kumar and Sapna Mukherjee was a chartbuster. The song "Har Kisi Ko" was later re-worked by Chirantan Bhatt for Boss (2013). The song "Pyaar Do Pyar Lo" was recreated twice for Thank You (2011) and Marjaavaan (2019), in which the song is renamed as "Ek To Kum Zindagani".

#	Title	Singer(s)
1	"Tera Saath Hai Kitna Pyara"	Kishore Kumar and Sapna Mukherjee
2	"Give Me Love"	Miriam Stockley
3	"Har Kisi Ko Nahi Milta" (Female)	Sadhana Sargam
4	"Har Kisi Ko Nahi Milta" (Male)	Manhar Udhas
5	"Har Kisi Ko Nahi Milta" (Duet)	Manhar Udhas, Sadhana Sargam
6	"Jab Jab Teri"	Mahesh Gadhvi and Sapna Mukherjee
7	"Janbaaz"	Mahesh Gadhvi and Nitu
8	"Pyar Do Pyar Lo"	Sapna Mukherjee
9	"Allah-O-Akbar"	Mahesh Gadhvi and Raju

== Watch Now ==
- https://www.youtube.com/watch?v=Zqagx2epLkk&t=101s
