= Har Kisi Ko =

Hindi song

Song by Nikhil D'Souza (Solo version) Arijit Singh and Neeti Mohan (Duet version)

from the album Boss soundtrack
- Released: 9 September 2013
- Genre: Pop; Filmi
- Length: 5:04 (Solo version); 5:37 (Duet version)
- Label: T-Series
- Composer: Kalyanji–Anandji,
- Lyricists: Indeevar (original lyrics), Manoj Yadav (new lyrics)
- Producer: Bhushan Kumar

Boss soundtrack track listing
- 1. "Boss"; 2. "Boss Entry (Theme)"; 3. "Boss (Remix)"; 4. "Har Kisi Ko"; 5. "Har Kisi Ko (Duet)"; 6. "Hum Na Tode"; 7. "Party All Night"; 8. "Pitah Se Hai Naam Tera"; 9. "Boss (Ganpati Mix)"

Music video
- "Har Kisi Ko" on YouTube

Har Kisi Ko (transl. For everyone) is a Hindi song from the 2013 Hindi film, Boss. Re-created by Chirantan Bhatt, the song is sung by Nikhil D'Souza, with lyrics by Manoj Yadav. The music video of this solo track features actors Shiv Panditt and Aditi Rao Hydari. A duet version of the same song was released as part of the film soundtrack, which was rendered by Arijit Singh and Neeti Mohan. This version is picturised on Akshay Kumar and Sonakshi Sinha. The song was originally composed by Kalyanji–Anandji, with lyrics by Indeevar and sung by Manhar Udhas and Sadhana Sargam for 1986 Bollywood film Janbaaz. The original version is picturised on Feroz Khan and Sridevi.

== Background ==
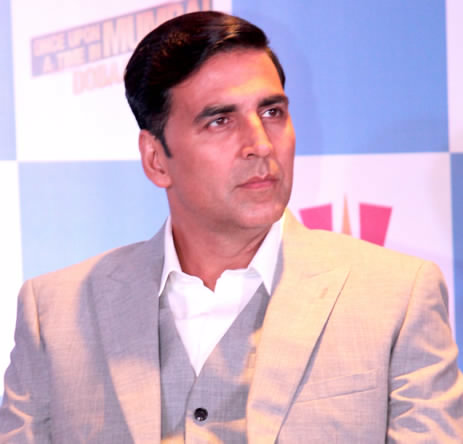
Akshay Kumar suggested to shoot the duet version of the song in a Feroz Khan style. Kumar appears in the version along with Sonakshi Sinha.

The song is re-adapted from the track of the same name in 1986 Bollywood film Janbaaz which is picturised on Feroz Khan and Sridevi. The original version penned by Indeevar was sung by Manhar Udhas and Sadhana Sargam and was composed by music director duo Kalyanji–Anandji. The renewed version of the song, re-mixed by Chirantan Bhatt has Shiv Panditt and Aditi Rao Hydari in the video. It has been extensively shot in Delhi and Pattaya.

The song is directed by Anthony D'Souza while cinematography is carried by Laxman Utekar. In the song Rao is presented in a bikini for which she responds; "I knew that my bikini shoot will never look cheap but pretty and sensual instead. That is a huge plus that I was riding on". Rao chose the song as the best track from the film.

On 2 October 2013, it was revealed that another version of the track "Har Kisi Ko" will be released as a promotional song which will be featured on Akshay Kumar and Sonakshi Sinha. Kumar and Sinha had earlier collaborated in films like Rowdy Rathore (2012), Joker (2012) and Once Upon ay Time in Mumbai Dobaara! (2013). In the duet version of the song Sinha is appeared wearing a white and a red saree while Kumar dons a cowboy style. They were seen romancing in a farm and shows a glimpse of Kumar wrestling a horse. Regarding the song, Kumar said; "I consider Feroz Khan to be the boss of coolness and style. I hope I have been able to do justice to his personality".

The duet version was shot by the suggestion of Kumar since it was a song from a Khan film, Kumar felt that they should shoot it like he would have. The version was choreographed by Ahmed Khan. Accordingly, he "wanted a lot of flamboyance to come across, which Feroz Khan was famous for". Moreover, he needed the version to be as different from the other songs in the film.

According to Sinha, "Nobody can recreate the kind of magic that [Sri Devi] did in that song". For the version Kumar requested producer of the film, Ashwin Varde for ten white horses to be appeared in the song but completed the shoot with five of them. Kumar picked the song as one of his favourite tracks from the album along with the song "Pitah Se Hai Naam Tera".

== Release and response ==
Both versions of "Har Kisi Ko" was released digitally as a part of the soundtrack of film on 9 September 2013. The music video of the solo version of the song was officially released on 13 September 2013, through the YouTube channel of T-Series, while the music video for the duet version was released on 2 October 2013 through the same platform.

== Critical reception ==
Both version of "Har Kisi Ko" received mixed response from music critics, due to the comparison between the composition and lyrics from the original to the re-created version.

Joginder Tuteja writing for Rediff.com was satisfied with the composition by Chirantan Bhatt. Giving its due credits, Tuteja stated; "The musical team does well in creating the kind of sound which is not like umpteen remixes or re-arranged versions that flood the music stands".

Writing for Koimoi, Mohar Basu was less enthusiastic about the song than the general consensus. Calling the song "an offensive gesture", Basu was disappointed "when young musicians rehash older tracks to make an entirely distorted version of it". Similarly, Bryan Durham from The Times of India felt the song is "average" compared to the original. Bollywood Hungama's Rajiv Vijayakar analysed that "Manoj Yadav's lyrics are not a patch on Indeevar's brilliant verse, and D'Souza's gasping, very Western rendition is also not in sync with the basic melody".

=== Solo version ===
Joginder Tuteja writing for Rediff.com felt the version "leaves an impact" with the company of both vocalists.

Same as for the solo version, Bollywood Hungama's Rajiv Vijayakar panned the version calling it "equally undistinguished" and criticising the "gimmicky high-pitched vocals". He further elaborated: "Every composition needs a specific octave and this is a classic example of a song pitched in the wrong scale". Bryan Durham from The Times of India not impressed about the song concluded that the version is better than solo version. Writing for Koimoi, Mohar Basu thought "Though singer Arijit Singh [is] first rate at [his] job, the lack of creativity in making something new is unimpressive".
