= Sange Meel Se Mulaqat =

- Directed by: Goutam Ghose
- Starring: Ustad Bismillah Khan
- Release date: 1989
- Country: India

Sang-e-Meel Se Mulaqat (from Urdu, meel = mile; sang = stone, mulaqat = meeting, Meeting the Milestone) is a 1989 documentary on life of Ustad Bismillah Khan by Goutam Ghose.

== Description ==
The film brilliantly captures the magic of Ustad Bismillah Khan's music: the shenai, Bismillah Khan the man himself and his hometown, Benaras. We learn how Bismillah Khan gradually evolved from a 14-year-old boy accompanying his Mamu (uncle) and guru Ali Baksh Khan at a concert in Allahabad to become, in course of time, one of India's all-time greats. The movie, replete with gripping incidents and anecdotes and stunning visuals of Beneras, is a rare glimpse of a legend that Ustad Bismillah Khan is.
