= Bismillah Khan =

Indian musician (1916–2006)

Ustad Bismillah Khan Bharat Ratna
- Born: Qamaruddin Khan; 21 March 1916; Dumraon, Bihar, British India
- Died: 21 August 2006 (aged 90) Varanasi, Uttar Pradesh, India
- Genre: Indian classical music
- Occupation: Musician
- Instrument: Shehnai
- Members: Afaq Haider, Savita Anand, Ajitesh Singh
- Past members: Zamin Husain Khan

Ustad Bismillah Khan (born Qamaruddin Khan, 21 March 1916 – 21 August 2006), often referred to by the title Ustad, was an Indian musician credited with popularizing the shehnai, a reeded woodwind instrument. His virtuosity made him a leading Hindustani classical music artist. While the shehnai had importance as a folk instrument played primarily by musicians schooled in traditional ceremonies, Khan elevated its status and brought it to the concert stage.

Khan was a devout Muslim but performed at both Hindu and Muslim ceremonies, and was considered a symbol of religious harmony. Owing to his fame, he was selected to perform for the ceremony at Delhi's historic Red Fort as the Indian flag unfurled at the hour of India's independence on 15 August 1947. Khan turned down invitations to perform in other countries before 1966, when the Indian government insisted that he play at the Edinburgh International Festival. This gained him a following in the West, and he continued to appear in Europe and North America thereafter.

In 2001, Bismillah Khan was awarded the Bharat Ratna, India's highest civilian honour, and the country observed a national day of mourning following his death in 2006. He became the third classical musician of India after M. S. Subbalakshmi and Ravi Shankar to be awarded the Bharat Ratna.

== Early life and training ==
Bismillah Khan was born into a family of traditional Muslim musicians at the big town of Dumraon, India, as the second son of Paigambar Bux Khan and Mitthanbai. His father was a court musician employed in the court of Maharaja Keshav Prasad Singh of Dumraon Raj. His two grandfathers Ustad Salar Hussain Khan and Rasool Bux Khan were also musicians in the Dumraon palace. He was named Qamruddin at birth, to rhyme with his elder brother's name Shamsuddin. Upon seeing the newborn, his grandfather Rasool Bux Khan, also a shehnai player, is said to have exclaimed "Bismillah", or "In the name of Allah", and thereafter he came to be known by Ustad Bismillah Khan.

== Career ==
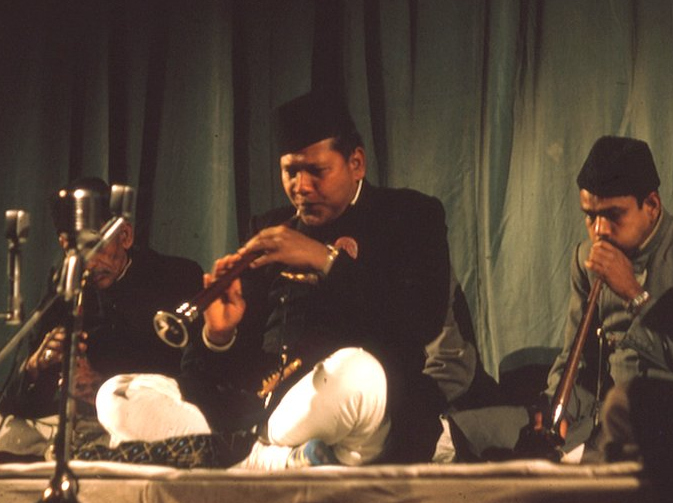
Bismillah Khan in Concert

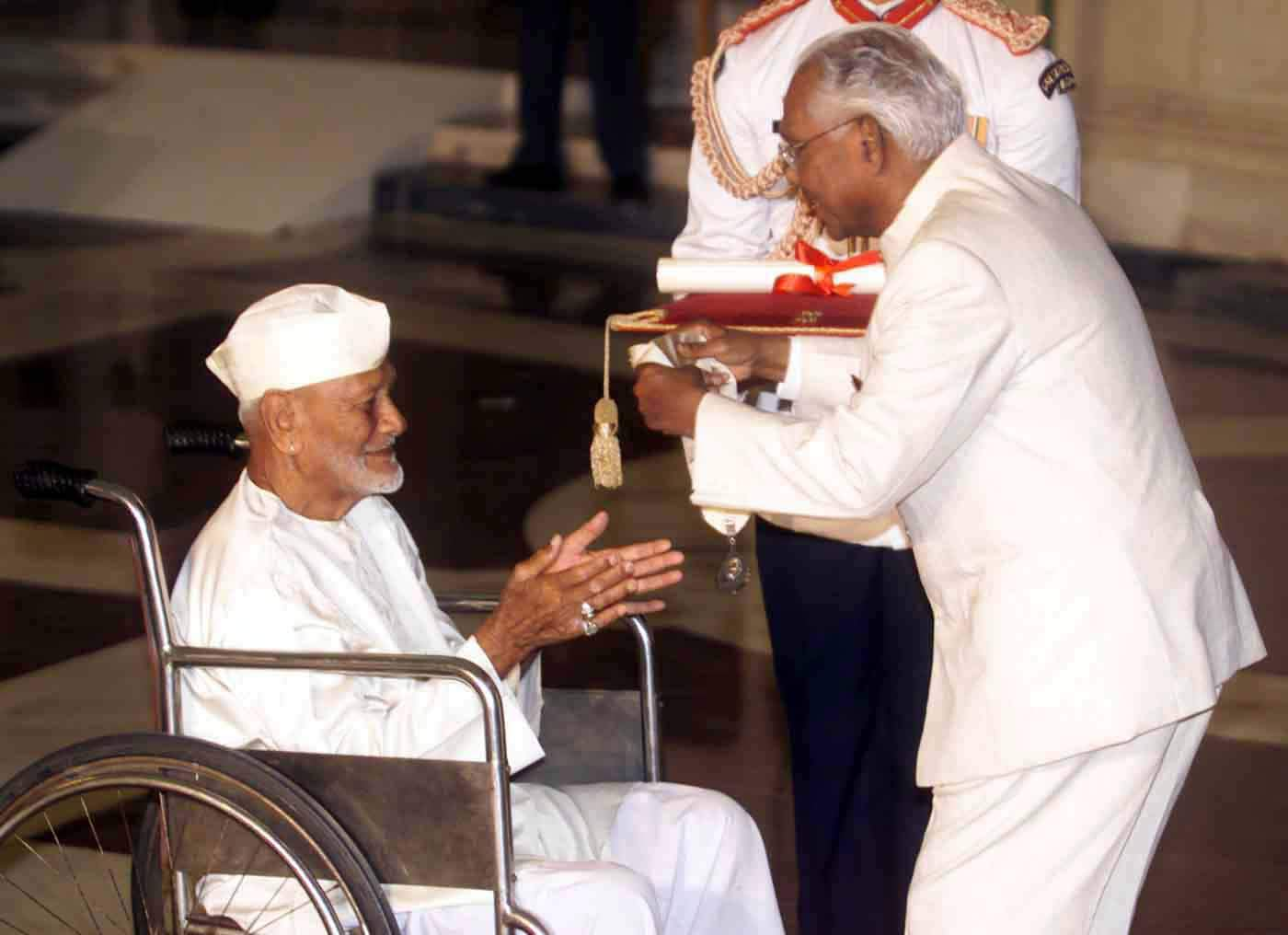
Ustad Bismillah Khan receiving India's highest civilian award, the Bharat Ratna, from then president K. R. Narayanan, New Delhi, 2001

At the age of 14, Bismillah accompanied his uncle to the Allahabad music conference. He used to practice with his shehnai on the banks of the river Ganga everyday.

Bismillah Khan began his career by playing at various stage shows. He got his first major break in 1937, when he played at a concert at All India Music Conference in Kolkata or Calcutta. This performance brought Shehnai into the limelight and was hugely appreciated by music lovers. He then went on to play in many countries.

== Teaching ==
Bismillah Khan attributed his skill to the blessings of nath (Shiva), and believed that there was little that he could teach his disciples. Khan seldom accepted students. He thought that if he would be able to share his knowledge it wouldn't be useful as it would only give his students a little knowledge. One of his senior most disciple is Pandit Shailesh Bhagwat, who was declared by Ustaad ji himself as "Second Bismillah".

Pandit Bhagwat has studied under Ustad ji's tutelage for 40 years. Some of his other notable disciples are Padmashri awardee Pandit S Ballesh Bhajantri, known as Dakshina Bharat Bismillah Khan and his son Krishna Ballesh Bhajantri, and Khan's own sons, Nazim Hussain, Zamin Hussain and Nayyar Hussain.

== Death ==
On 17 March 2006, Bismillah Khan's health deteriorated and he was admitted to the Heritage Hospital, Varanasi for treatment. Khan's last wish – to perform at India Gate, could not be fulfilled. He wanted to pay tributes to the martyrs. He waited in vain till his last rites. He died of cardiac arrest on 21 August 2006, at the age of 90.

The Government of India declared a day of national mourning on his death. His body along with a Shehnai was buried at Fatemaan burial ground of old Varanasi under a neem tree with a 21-gun salute from the Indian Army.

== Legacy ==
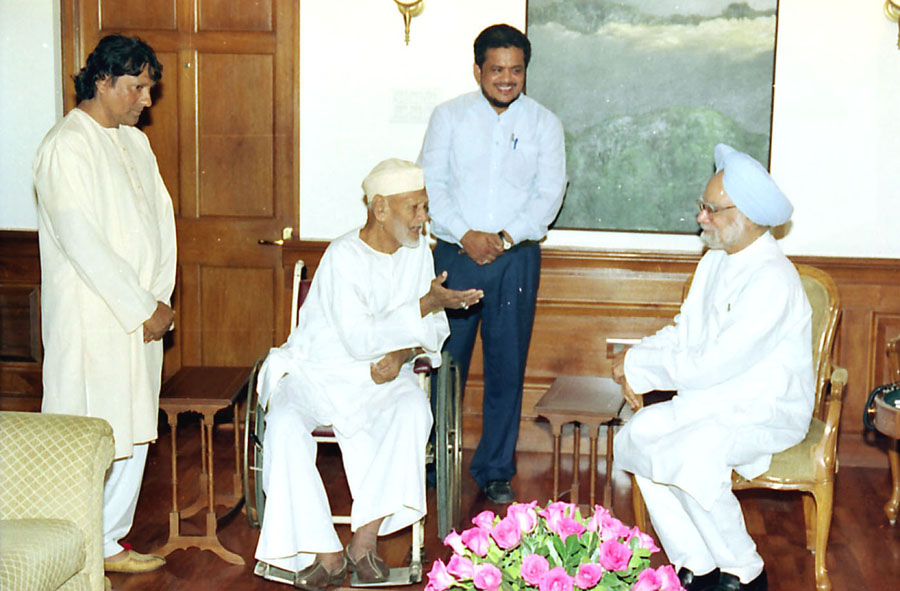
Shehnai maestro Ustad Bismillah Khan calls on the Prime Minister Dr. Manmohan Singh, in New Delhi on 30 September 2004

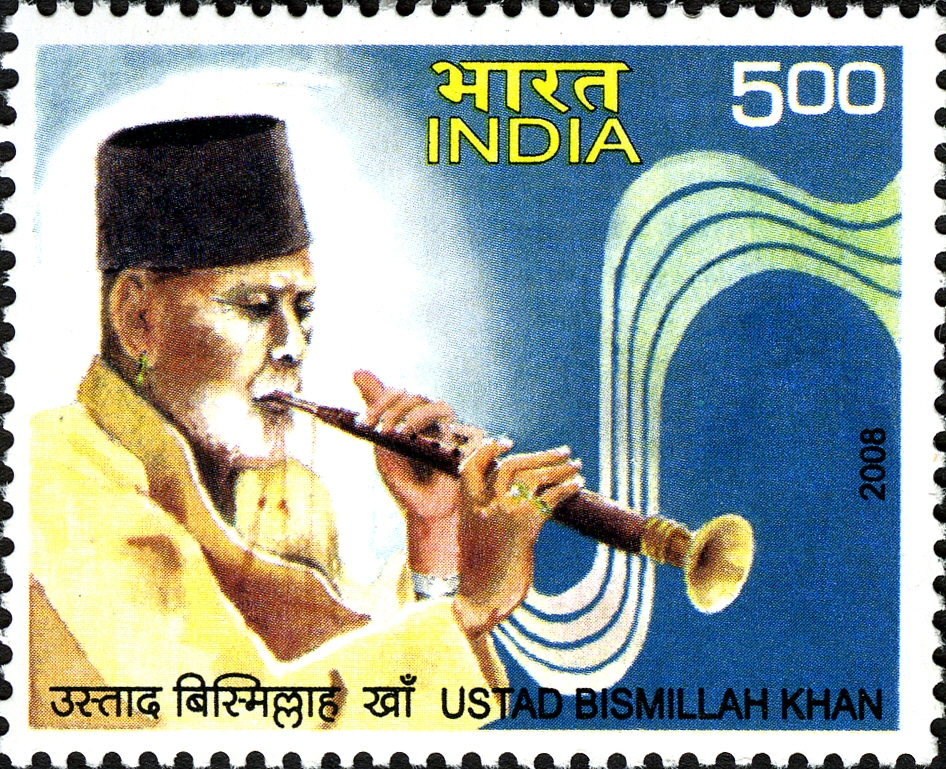
Khan on a 2008 stamp of India

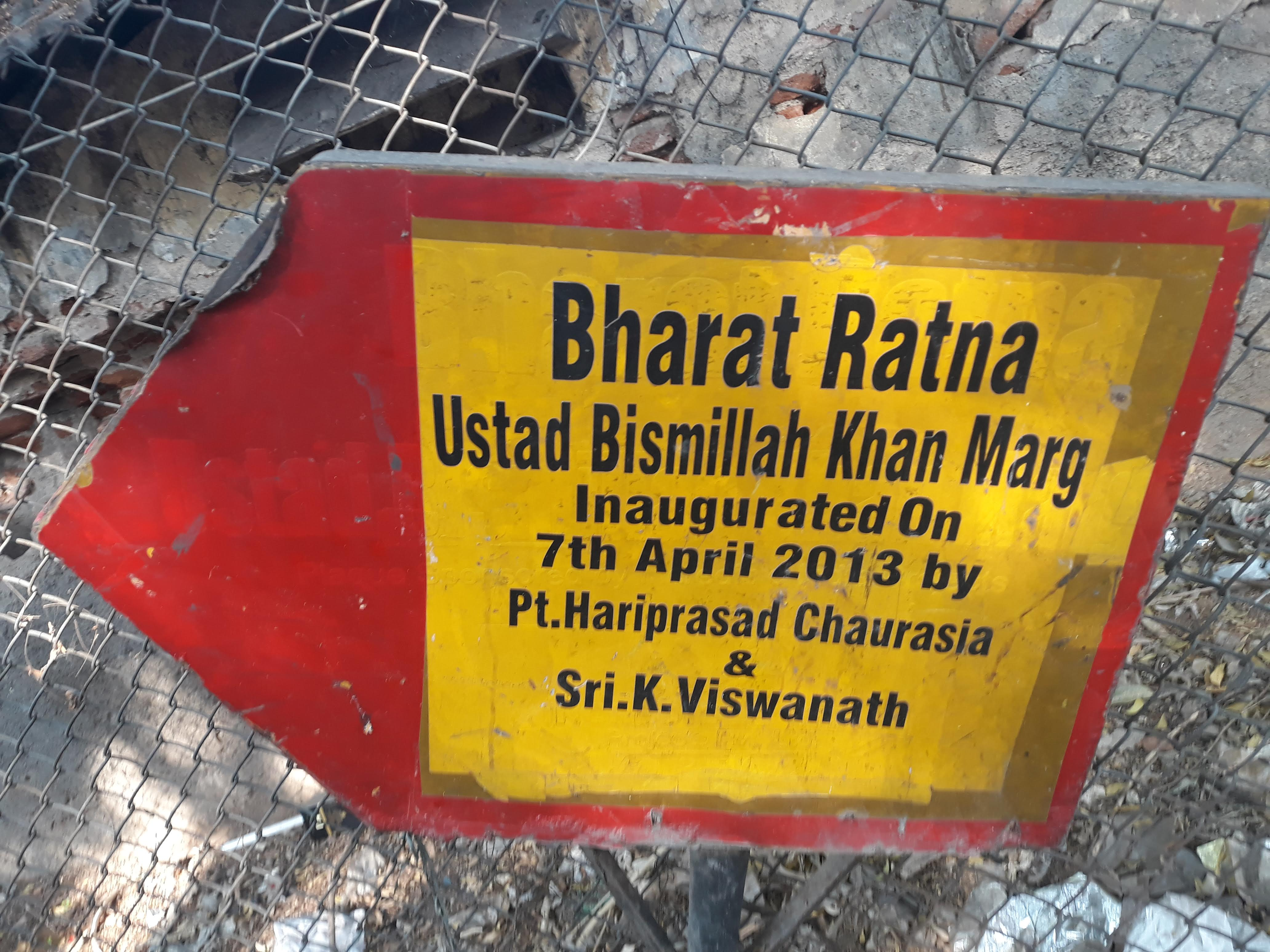
Street in Hyderabad, Telangana, named after Bismallah Khan which was inaugurated by Pandit Hariprasad Chaurasia and K Viswanath on 7 April 2013.

Sangeet Natak Akademi, New Delhi, instituted the Ustad Bismillah Khan Yuva Puraskar in 2006, in his honour. It is given to young artists in the field of music, theatre and dance. The Government of Bihar has proposed setting up of a museum, a town hall-cum-library and installation of a life-size statue at his birthplace in Dumraon.

Bismillah Khan was commemorated on his 102nd birth anniversary by Search Engine Google which showed a special doodle Google Doodle on its Indian home page for him on 21 March 2018.

In the documentary film, Eric Clapton: Life in 12 Bars, Clapton cites Bismillah Khan as an influence and how he tried to use his guitar to imitate the music of Khan's woodwind instrument.

== In popular culture ==
Khan had a brief association with films in India. He played the shehnai for Rajkumar's role of Appanna in the Vijay's Kannada-language film Sanaadi Appanna which became a blockbuster. He acted in Jalsaghar by Satyajit Ray and played the shehnai for Vijay Bhatt's Goonj Uthi Shehnai (1959).

Noted director Goutam Ghose directed Sange Meel Se Mulaqat (1989), an Indian documentary film about the life of Khan. Imtiaz Ali's Rockstar character Ustad Jameel Khan played by Shammi Kapoor was slightly inspired by Khan.

== Awards and recognitions ==
=== Awards ===
- Bharat Ratna, India's highest civilian award. (2001)
- Swathi Sangeetha Puraskaram (1998), Government of Kerala
- T Choudayya National Award (1995), Government of Karnataka
- Fellowship of Sangeet Natak Akademi (1994)
- Tahar Mausique from the Republic of Iran (1992)
- Padma Vibhushan, India's second highest civilian honor (1980)
- Padma Bhushan (1968)
- Padma Shri (1961)
- Sangeet Natak Akademi Award (1956)
- Tansen Award by Govt. of Madhya Pradesh.Sehore
- Three medals in All India Music Conference, Calcutta (1937)

=== Recognitions ===
Bismillah Khan had honorary doctorates from:

- Banaras Hindu University, Varanasi
- Visva-Bharati University, Shantiniketan

Others include

- Was invited by then Prime Minister of India Pandit Jawaharlal Nehru to play shehnai on the first Independence Day (15 August 1947) in Delhi's Red Fort.
- Participated in World Exposition in Montreal
- Participated in Cannes Art Festival
- Participated in Osaka Trade Fair
- India Post issued commemorative postage stamps of ₹5.00 denomination on 21 August 2008
- On the 102nd anniversary of his day of birth, Google honoured Bismillah Khan with a Google doodle.

== Selective discography ==
Albums

- Sanaadi Appanna – Played shehnai for Rajkumar's role in the movie.
- Goonj Uthi Shehnai (1959) – shehnai recitals throughout the movie for Rajendra Kumar's role.
- Maestro's Choice (February 1994)
- Megh Malhar, Vol. 4 (the other piece in the album is by Kishori Amonkar) (September 1994)
- Live at the Queen Elizabeth Hall (September 2000)
- Live in London, Vol. 2 (September 2000)
- Immortal Series

Contributing artist

- The Rough Guide to the Music of India and Pakistan (1996, World Music Network)

== Biographies ==
- Bismillah Khan: the shehnai maestro, by Neeraja Poddar. Rupa & Co., 2018. ISBN 81-291-0351-6.
- Monograph on Shehnai maestro Bismillah Khan, by Amar Jyoti, Shivnath Jha, Alok Jain, Anjali Sinha. Pub. Neena Jha & Shivnath Jha, 2019. ISBN 9788175256408.
- Bismillah Khan and Banaras: the seat of shehnai, by Rita Ganguly. Siddhi Books, 1994.
- Shahnai Vadak Ustad Bismillah Khan, by Murli Manohar Shrivguguiastava. Prabhat Prakashan, 2009. ISBN 9788173157356.
- Bismillah Khan: The Maestro from Benaras, by Juhi Sinha. Niyogi Books, 2011. ISBN 978-81-89738-91-4.
- Naubatkhane Mein Ibadat, by Yatindra Mishra. Chapter in NCERT's Hindi textbook for 10th Standard.
- In the NCERT English Textbook for 9th Grade he is credited largely in the chapter The Sound Of Music.
