= Roja (soundtrack) =

Soundtrack album by A. R. Rahman
- Released: 27 July 1992
- Recorded: Panchathan Record Inn, Chennai
- Genre: Feature film soundtrack
- Length: 25:33
- Labels: Lahari Music (Original); Magnasound Records (Hindi and Marathi); T-Series; Sony Music India

A. R. Rahman chronology
Roja (1992)	Yodha (1992)

Roja is the debut soundtrack album of music composer A. R. Rahman, featuring lyrics by Vairamuthu. It is the soundtrack to the 1992 Tamil film of the same name, directed by Mani Ratnam, and starring Aravind Swamy and Madhoo. The album features seven tracks in Tamil and Hindi, and six tracks in Malayalam, Telugu, Marathi and five tracks in the instrumental adaptation album.

The song "Thamizha Thamizha" is a poem written by Subramanya Bharathi. "Chinna Chinna Aasai" was the first song Rahman had composed for the film. The song "Kadhal Rojave" has two versions in both Tamil and Hindi; a solo and a duet in the former. The Hindi version of the song was titled "Roja Jaaneman" has two versions – one by S. P. Balasubrahmanyam and the other by Hariharan.

Released on Lahari Music & T-Series, it was also listed in Time magazine's "10 Best Soundtracks" of all time. It also fetched the National Film Award for Best Music Direction for A. R. Rahman and the National Film Award for Best Lyrics for Vairamuthu.

The Tamil and Hindi versions of the album sold over 3 million units in India, with the Tamil version selling over 200,000 units and the Hindi version selling 2.8 million units. The Hindi version of the album earned ₹7.5 crore (equivalent to ₹63 crore or US$6.7 million in 2026) in sales.

== Background ==
Mani Ratnam after his long relationship with Ilaiyaraaja, decided to collaborate with a newcomer. He initially approached advertisement jingle composer Mahesh Mahadevan, who refused since it required full-time commitment to the project. Ratnam happened to listen to some ad jingles, composed by Rahman, in an awards function, where Rahman received the award for Best Jingle Composer. Impressed with Rahman's works, Ratnam visited his studio and listened to a tune that Rahman had composed long back on the Kaveri River water dispute (later revealed to be "Tamizha Tamizha" from the soundtrack). Ratnam signed him immediately for his next project, Roja, which was the first one in his terrorism trilogy. In an August 2016 interview with Filmfare, Rahman recalled that he chose not to pursue education at Berklee College of Music because he got to work on Roja.

== Development ==
Rahman used instruments and grand arrangements to generate an expansive sound. Songs such as "Rukkumani" had a loud thumping feel and became ingrained in pop culture. The score was performed at the Panchathan Record Inn in Chennai. The song "Thamizha Thamizha" is a poem written by Subramanya Bharathi. According to some sources, "Chinna Chinna Aasai" was the first song Rahman had composed for the film in early 1992. He first composed a sad version before Mani Ratnam asked for a peppier version.

For the lyrics of song, Vairamuthu revealed that the song took two and half hours to write and he wrote 120 desires in the song but later shortened it into 16 and also revealed that he used the lines of a song which was originally composed for Doordarshan. The song "Kadhal Rojave" is set in the Kapi raga.

Regarding the music Mani Ratnam says, "I was trying to do a film, I wanted good music and I was searching for somebody who would and I heard a demonstration tape of his which he had sent across. I thought that in the first note of the piece that he had sent me was really brilliant, really outstanding piece. So I went across to his studio and he played me some more, lots of things which he had done for jingles and a few other musical pieces he has done for somebody else. They were quite amazing and I had no doubts that he would be right for my film." For the Hindi version of the soundtrack, Alka Yagnik and Kumar Sanu were offered to sing the songs, but both declined as they did not know about Rahman at that time.

== Release history ==
The soundtrack album was originally released in Tamil by Lahari Music on 27 July 1992. The soundtrack was later released in Malayalam and Telugu in 1993 and in Hindi and Marathi in 1994 by Magnasound. The instrumental special version featuring five songs was released in Tamil and Telugu by Lahari Music in 1993 and in Hindi by Magnasound in 1994.

== Reception and influence ==
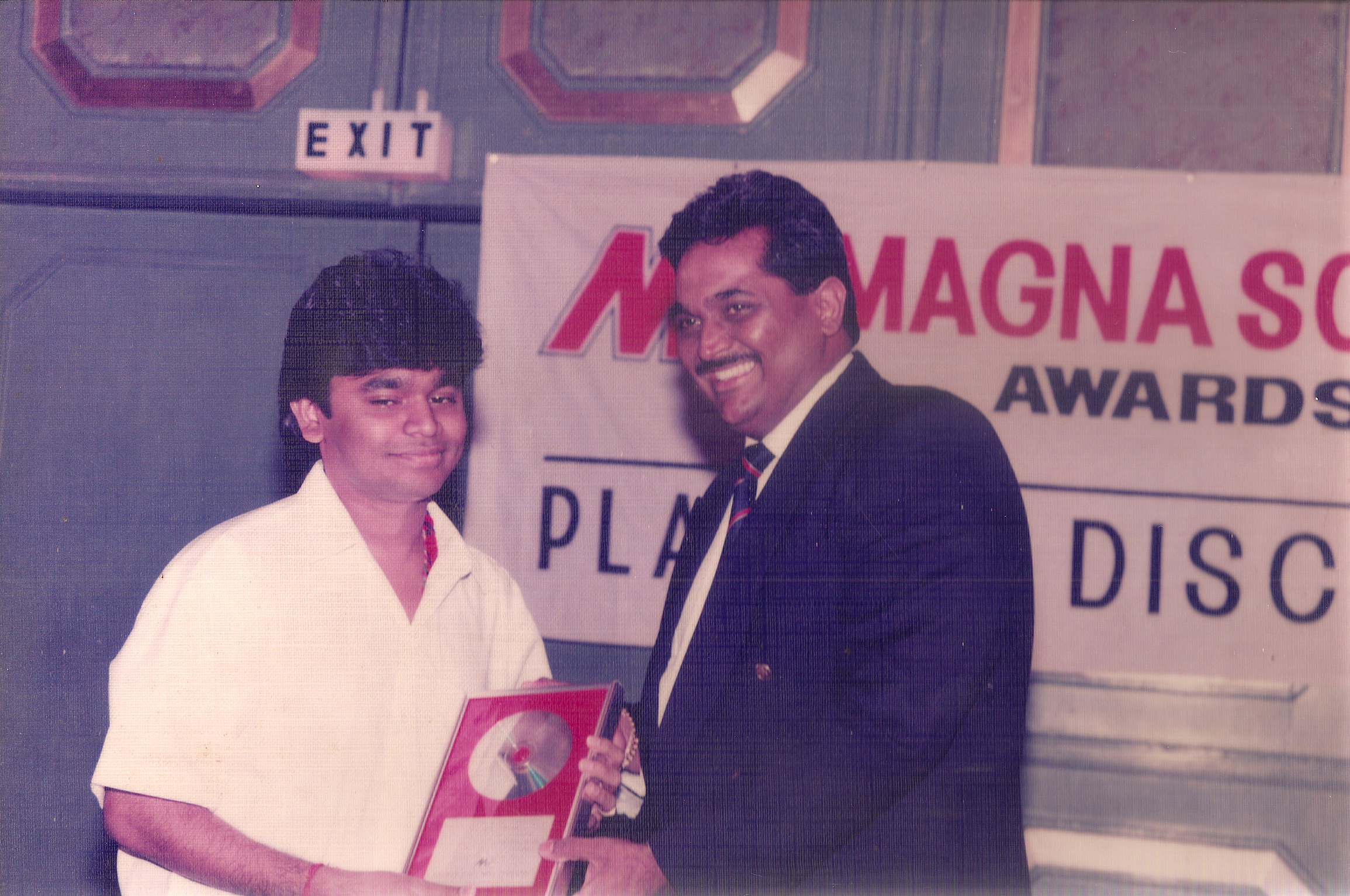
A. R. Rahman receiving a Platinum sales disc at the MagnaSound Awards for Roja

Rahman introduced new orchestral melodies in Indian film soundtracks, which till then was based on a few traditional Indian instruments. Time magazine's noted film critic, Richard Corliss stated in 2005 that the "astonishing debut work parades Rahman's gift for alchemizing outside influences until they are totally Tamil, totally Rahman," naming it one of the magazine's "10 Best Soundtracks" of all time.

Through Roja several singers got their breakthrough in the Tamil music scene as well. Sujatha Mohan, Unni Menon and Minmini, who is only known as the singer of "Chinna Chinna Aasai", probably her best known song in her entire career, were noticed following their performances in Roja, while noted ghazal singer Hariharan made his Tamil debut through this album. Rahman even had musically untrained elderly women sing. A Bengali song was made from song "Chinna Chinna Aasai", "Chotto ei grame choto ai aasha", from Bengali film Ranga Bou 1999.

In the 2023 film Animal, a medley of the instrumentals of Kadhal Rojave, Tamizha Tamizha and Chinna Chinna Aasai was used as background music during the introduction of Ranbir Kapoor's character.

In the 2025 film The Diplomat, the track "Bharat" was re-used during the end credits.

== Awards ==
A. R. Rahman won the National Film Award for Best Music Direction, the first time ever by a debutant. Rahman also earned Tamil Nadu State Film Award for Best Music Director and Filmfare Best Music Director Award (Tamil) for his work. Vairamuthu won the National Film Award for Best Lyrics for "Chinna Chinna Aasai", while Minmini won the Tamil Nadu State Film Award for Best Female Playback for the same song.

== Track listing ==
=== Tamil ===
All lyrics are written by Vairamuthu, except Thamizha Thamizha written by Subramanya Bharathi; all music is composed by A. R. Rahman.

Label : Lahari Music
No.	Title	Lyrics	Artist(s)	Length
1.	"Chinna Chinna Asai (Version 1)"	Vairamuthu	Minmini	4:55
2.	"Pudhu Vellai Mazhai"	Vairamuthu	Unni Menon, Sujatha Mohan	5:16
3.	"Kaadhal Rojave" (Duet)	Vairamuthu	S. P. Balasubrahmanyam, Sujatha Mohan	5:03
4.	"Chinna Chinna Asai (Version 2- Bit)" (Bit)	Vairamuthu	Minmini	1:05
5.	"Rukkumani Rukkumani"	Vairamuthu	S. P. Balasubrahmanyam, K. S. Chithra	6:02
6.	"Thamizha Thamizha"	Subramanya Bharathi	Hariharan, Chorus (Sujatha Mohan)	3:07
7.	"Kaadhal Rojave" (Solo)	Vairamuthu	S. P. Balasubrahmanyam	5:03

=== Hindi ===
All lyrics are written by P. K. Mishra; all music is composed by A. R. Rahman.

Label : Sony Music India
No.	Title	Artist(s)	Length
1.	"Chhoti Si Asha (Version 1)"	Minmini	4:56
2.	"Rukmani Rukmani"	Baba Sehgal, Shweta Shetty	6:05
3.	"Roja Jaaneman" (Version 1)	S. P. Balasubrahmanyam, Sujatha Mohan	5:07
4.	"Yeh Haseen Vaadiyaan"	S. P. Balasubrahmanyam, K. S. Chithra	5:21
5.	"Roja Jaaneman" (Version 2)	Hariharan, Sujatha Mohan	5:07
6.	"Chhoti Si Asha (Version 2)" (Bit)	Minmini	1:07
7.	"Bharat Hum Ko Jaane Se Pyaara Hai"	Hariharan	3:05

=== Malayalam ===
All lyrics are written by Mankombu Gopalakrishnan; all music is composed by A. R. Rahman.

Label : Sony Music India
No.	Title	Artist(s)	Length
1.	"Oru Mandhasmitham"	Sujatha Mohan, Unni Menon	5:18
2.	"Chella Chella Asha (Version 1)"	K. S. Chithra	4:57
3.	"Omal Poonkuyile"	Biju Narayanan, Sujatha Mohan	5:04
4.	"Thankamani Thankamani"	Sujatha Mohan, Unni Menon	6:02
5.	"Bharatham Ente"	G. Venugopal	3:05
6.	"Chella Chella Asha (Version 2)" (Bit)	K. S. Chithra	1:07

=== Telugu ===
All lyrics are written by Rajasri; all music is composed by A. R. Rahman.

Label : Lahari Music
No.	Title	Artist(s)	Length
1.	"Chinni Chinni Aasha"	Minmini	4:57
2.	"Nagamani Nagamani"	S. P. Balasubrahmanyam, K. S. Chithra	6:00
3.	"Na Cheli Rojave"	S. P. Balasubrahmanyam, Sujatha Mohan	5:04
4.	"Paruvam Vanaga"	S. P. Balasubrahmanyam, Sujatha Mohan	5:18
5.	"Vinaraa Vinaraa"	Mano	3:07
6.	"Chinna Chinna Aasha" (Bit)	K. S. Chithra	1:07

=== Marathi ===
All lyrics are written by Jagadish Khebudkar; all music is composed by A. R. Rahman.

Label : Sony Music India
No.	Title	Artist(s)	Length
1.	"Bhole Man Majhe"	Uttara Kelkar	4:57
2.	"Rukmini Rukmini"	Sudesh Bhonsle, Shweta Shetty	6:02
3.	"Roja Priyatam"	Suresh Wadkar, Sujatha Mohan	5:04
4.	"Dhundh Varshav Ha"	Anupama Deshpande, Suresh Wadkar	5:18
5.	"Bhole Man Majhe" (Bit)	Uttara Kelkar	1:07
6.	"Bharath Majha"	Ravindra Sathe	3:05

=== Instrumental adaptation ===
An instrumental adaptation album was also released. The album was released in Tamil, Telugu and Hindi.
