= Puli (soundtrack) =

Puli (Note: The soundtrack album was released under the title Komaram Puli (refer album cover), despite the film's title being changed to Puli.)

Soundtrack album by A. R. Rahman
- Released: 20 August 2010
- Recorded: Panchathan Record Inn and AM Studios, Chennai, India; K. M. Musiq Studios, Los Angeles
- Genre: Feature film soundtrack
- Length: 29:09
- Label: Sony Music
- Producer: A. R. Rahman

A. R. Rahman chronology
Raavan / Raavanan (2010)	Puli (Note: The soundtrack album was released under the title Komaram Puli (refer album cover), despite the film's title being changed to Puli.) (2010)	Enthiran (2010)

Puli is the soundtrack to the 2010 Telugu action film of the same name, directed by S. J. Suryah and starring Pawan Kalyan. The soundtrack includes six songs composed by A. R. Rahman and lyrics written by Chandrabose. The album was released on 20 August 2010 by Sony Music. The album was released under the film's working title Komaram Puli, with the title of the film being changed to Puli upon release.

The album and background score received positive critical reception upon release. It was nominated for various music awards such as Best Music Director and Best Background Score (Rahman), and Best Female Playback (Shweta Mohan for "Amma Thalle"), but most of the awards in the Best Music Direction and Background Score categories mainly lost to Ye Maaya Chesave, composed by Rahman himself. Shweta Mohan won Best Female Playback for the song "Amma Thalle" in the 2010 Mirchi Music Awards South.

== Release ==
The release rights of the album was purchased by Sony Music for ₹2 crore (US$210,000). The track listing was published on A. R. Rahman's official website on 13 August 2010. A 30 second promo of the song "Maaralente" was released through this website on the same day. Promos of other songs were released the next day. The audio was launched on 20 August 2010 by the then Andhra Pradesh Chief Minister K Rosaiah, Rahman and his mother Kareema Begum in a function held at H.I.C.C Novotel, Hyderabad. The function was attended by K. Rosaiah, S. J. Suryah, Allu Aravind, Pawan Kalyan, Nikeesha Patel, Shriya Saran, A. R. Rahman, Chandrabose, Anand Sai and many others.

== Overview ==
The picturisation of the songs were also noted. Two songs were choreographed by Bollywood choreographer Ahmed Khan. The songs choreographed by him were "Power Star", the introduction song of Pawan Kalyan and "Dochey", the item number featuring Shriya Saran. The songs were filmed in two schedules at Annapurna Studios beginning from 18 May. Out of the six songs, four songs were directly included while the remaining two were background songs. Lyricist Chandrabose collaborated with Rahman for the first time through this film. However, the lyrics penned by him got notably mixed reviews and even his name was not credited in the front CD cover. The lyricist was also criticised for using certain words like "heroin" and "cocaine" in the track "Power Star". He took almost three months to write the song "Amma Thale" while all it took to write the song "Maaralente" was 30 minutes. The original score, composed by Rahman also won critical appreciations. He collaborated with artists from three European countries for re-recording the background score.

The first song in the movie is "Namakame", picturised on Saranya, when she prays at a temple before the birth of her son. The next song, "Maham Maye" is a duet, picturised on Nikeesha Patel, when she tries to grab the attention of Pawan Kalyan. "Amma Thale" comes in close succession and is of the similar theme. Fourth song, "Dochey" is an item number by Shriya Saran, who is a casino dancer in the film. "Power Star", is picturised on Nikeesha and Pawan and it praises the style and hero qualities of Pawan. The last song, "Maaralente", is a background song used throughout the movie, notably during the Puli team formation and the climax scenes.

== Reception ==
The soundtrack got generally positive reviews and has become a hot seller during recent days. 3 lakh units of the audio CD was sold within few days after audio release.

Professional ratings
Review scores
Source	Rating
Musicaloud	8/10 stars
Behindwoods	(not rated)

The soundtrack has also received positive critical reviews. Behindwoods commented that the soundtrack as usual is a great piece from Rahman. A review on NDTV said, "As far as music is concerned, the re-recording is excellent, but the songs are only so good." However, a review by Rediff said, "Rahman's music is not as great as expected except for the song Maaralente which seems touching, fairly powerful and reverberates in the mind even after the film is over."

== Track listing ==
All lyrics written by Chandrabose.

Track listing
No.	Title	Singer(s)	Length
1.	"Power Star"	Vijay Prakash, Tanvi Shah	4:45
2.	"Amma Thale"	Naresh Iyer, Shweta Mohan	4:30
3.	"Maaralente"	A. R. Rahman, K. M. M. C. Choir	5:02
4.	"Maham Maye"	Javed Ali, Suchitra, Mili Nair	4:08
5.	"Dochey"	Shreya Ghoshal, Lady Kash n' Krissy	4:21
6.	"Namakame"	K. S. Chithra, Madhushree, Harini	6:25
