= Changing Seasons (music video) =

2011 music video by A. R. Rahman

- Produced by: Y. M. Movies
- Starring: Aishwarya Rai; A. R. Rahman
- Music by: A. R. Rahman
- Release date: 18 January 2011
- Running time: 4:41
- Languages: Hindi; Tamil

Changing Seasons is a music video by Indian composer A. R. Rahman. The video was simultaneously released in Hindi and Tamil on 18 January 2011. The song "Jaare Udd Jaare" (Hindi) / "Naan Varuvene" (Tamil) featured in the video was composed by Rahman and performed by Rahman and Jali Fily Cissokho. The video, produced by Y. M. Movies and filmed by John Warner, features Aishwarya Rai along with Rahman. The song was originally composed for Bollywood film Raavan and its Tamil version Raavanan. The song was previously released on the Hindi Raavan and the Tamil Raavanan soundtrack albums respectively in 2010.

== Song composition and information ==
Rahman reused the song "Jaare Udd Jaare" (Hindi) / "Naan Varuvene" (Tamil), which was composed for Raavan / Raavanan for the music video. Both the songs were featured in respective films but were not released in the soundtrack. However, the Tamil version was released in the Collectors' edition pack of the soundtrack. The song was originally composed and recorded by Rahman in his Mumbai studio taking only a few hours. The lyrics have been penned by Gulzar for the Hindi version, Vairamuthu for the Tamil version and Veturi for the Telugu Version.

== Music video ==
A promotional teaser of the video was released on 3 January. Rahman posted the teaser on his Twitter page and commented that his first international music video will be released soon. The music video premiered on YouTube on 18 January 2011. The video made use of several unused scenes and film images of Aishwarya Rai from Mani Ratnam's Raavan / Raavanan. The subject of the music video itself is inspired by the theme of the film. In a later interview, Rahman thanked Ratnam for allowing him to use the unused film images of Aishwarya Rai in the video.
