= Changing Seasons (Phil Dwyer album) =

Studio album by Phil Dwyer
- Released: 2012
- Genre: Contemporary jazz

Changing Seasons is a 2012 jazz album by the Phil Dwyer Orchestra featuring violinist Mark Fewer. It won the Juno Award for Contemporary Jazz Album of the Year in 2012.
