= Boss (2013 Hindi film) =

2013 Indian film by Anthony D'Souza

- Theatrical release poster
- Directed by: Anthony D'Souza
- Written by: Farhad-Sajid
- Based on: Pokkiri Raja by Vysakh
- Produced by: Ashwin Varde
- Starring: Akshay Kumar; Mithun Chakraborty; Ronit Roy; Shiv Panditt; Aditi Rao Hydari; Johnny Lever; Danny Denzongpa
- Narrated by: Amitabh Bachchan
- Cinematography: Laxman Utekar
- Edited by: Rameshwar S. Bhagat
- Music by: Score: Sandeep Shirodkar; Songs: Meet Bros Anjjan; Chirantan Bhatt; Yo Yo Honey Singh; P. A. Deepak
- Production companies: Viacom18 Motion Pictures; Cape of Good Films; Ashwin Varde Production
- Distributed by: Viacom18 Motion Pictures
- Release date: 16 October 2013
- Running time: 143 minutes
- Country: India
- Language: Hindi
- Budget: ₹70 crore
- Box office: ₹102.82 crore

Boss is a 2013 Indian Hindi-language action comedy film directed by Anthony D'Souza, written by Farhad-Sajid and produced by Viacom18 Motion Pictures, Cape of Good Films and Ashwin Varde. A remake of the 2010 Malayalam film Pokkiri Raja, it stars Akshay Kumar as the titular character, along with Mithun Chakraborty, Shiv Panditt, Ronit Roy and Aditi Rao Hydari. The film was released worldwide on 16 October 2013, coinciding with both Dusshehra and the fourth anniversary of D'Souza's directorial debut starring Kumar, Blue (2009).

== Plot ==
Transport businessman Tauji a.k.a. Big Boss, also known as a notorious gangster, based in Kurukshetra, is being escorted by his man Lallan on the way to Mirzapur for work. Enroute, they halt over at a stop where Tauji encounters an unnamed young boy who later saves his life after Lallan reveals his betrayal of Big Boss to his rival Dushyant. Big Boss takes the young boy in, calling him "Boss".

15 years later, retired schoolteacher Satyakant Acharya Shastri is shown to be reading an old report on the incident when his friend Raghunath asks him why he is not over it. Satyakant reveals that the young boy, in fact his son Suryakant "Surya" Shastri, is no longer his son but rather a criminal; he believes his only son is his other son, Shivakant "Shiv" Shastri. Satyakant and Raghunath send Shiv to Delhi to live with his maternal uncle Zorawar Singh, a sub-inspector, who contrary to their perception is not really the competent cop he is thought to be. Zorawar, who is injured, suggests Shiv take his place as assigned security to Assistant Commissioner of Police Ayushman Thakur's sister; to his surprise, it turns out Shiv knows her as Ankita from an intercollege fest. Shiv and Ankita grow close and fall in love. Ayushman is in cahoots with the corrupt and power-hungry Home Minister, Vishwaas Pradhan, who suggests to Ayushman that he should get Ankita married to his son Vishal. Ayushman agrees and decides that Ankita will marry him whether she wants to or not. Upon finding out she is in love with Shiv, he has Shiv arrested and convicted for crimes he hasn't committed right in the presence of Satyakant and Raghunath who were summoned quickly by Zorawar, who is also suspended in the process.

Ayushman, on realizing Satyakant is Shiv's father, humiliates and throws him out. He and Raghunath then warn Ayushman that the one they must now turn to help for will prove to be a menace for him. The story then shifts to Kurukshetra, wherein Boss has grown up into a suave, tough transport businessman who fights for justice. At his palatial residence, he kicks out one of his clients for bringing a contract related to a schoolteacher, which is when his past is explored in a flashback.

After Surya picks up brawls with another child, the son of the local Sarpanch, multiple times and is eventually believed to have killed him, Satyakant kicks him out and disowns him; after he is released from juvenile detention, Surya ends up killing the Sarpanch and his men in self-defense when they attack him, which is witnessed again by Satyakant, Raghunath and Shiv, causing him to walk away abandoned. Back in the present, after Big Boss informs him of a new contract from Pradhan, revealed to be a longtime client, to kill a young man, Satyakant visits Boss coldheartedly and gives him a photograph of Shiv, which convinces Surya that Shiv's life is in danger and Ayushman is using him to meet his and Pradhan's own ends.

Boss meets Ayushman, and Vishal convinces him to free Shiv from all charges, telling him that Boss would kill Shiv when he is released from police custody. Boss, however, helps Shiv escape from custody, revealing his identity as Surya to him. Pradhan sends his cops to capture Boss and take him to Ayushman's farmhouse. Boss escapes from the goons and reaches Ayushman's farmhouse. Pradhan calls Tauji there to complain about Boss; in front of Tauji, Pradhan cancels his contract of killing Shiv with Tauji. After noticing Ankita, Surya asks her whether she loves Shiv — she replies positively. He takes the responsibility of getting Ankita married to Shiv in front of Tauji and Ayushman. Satyakant and Shiv are attacked by a contract killer, Jabbar Bhai, and his goons, sent by Pradhan. Surya incapacitates Jabbar Bhai and his gang, saving his father and brother.

Twenty-five of the MLAs of Pradhan's political party are caught red-handed at a brothel with prostitutes by the media with the help of an unknown informer, later revealed to be Boss. Ayushman sets a trap against Shiv by setting up Ankita's friend Dimple and arresting Shiv in a fake rape case. When he is reprimanded again by Satyakant in front of Tauji and leaves, Surya then tortures Vishal and plants a fake time bomb in his buttocks to force Shiv out of police custody. Tauji informs Satyakant that Surya did not kill his schoolmate and that it was an accident. Satyakant, realizing his folly, rushes to meet Surya and Shiv along with Tauji, but their car is hit by a truck driven by Ayushman. Tauji survives the accident; while Raghunath dies on the spot, Satyakant is injured and hospitalized. Finally, Boss brutally defeats Ayushman, followed by a long fight; in the end, Satyakant with Shiv is shown opening his arms, calling Surya to hug, and they reunite.

== Cast ==
- Akshay Kumar as Suryakant "Surya" Shastri a.k.a. Boss, Satyakant's elder son, Shiv's elder brother
- Rushiraj Pawar as Young Surya
- Mithun Chakraborty as Satyakant Shastri, Surya, and Shiv's father
- Ronit Roy as ACP Ayushman Thakur, a corrupt police officer, Ankita's elder brother
- Shiv Panditt as Shivakant "Shiv" Shastri, Satyakant's younger son, Surya's younger brother, Ankita's love interest
- Shivansh Kotia as Young Shiv
- Aditi Rao Hydari as Ankita Thakur, Ayushman's sister, Shiv's love interest
- Danny Denzongpa as Tauji / Big Boss, Surya's mentor and father figure
- Johnny Lever as Zorawar Singh, Surya's sidekick
- Sanjay Mishra as Trilok, Surya's sidekick
- Parikshit Sahni as Raghunath
- Govind Namdeo as Vishwaas Pradhan, a corrupt home minister in cahoots with Ayushman
- Aakash Dabhade as Vishal Pradhan, Vishwaas's son
- Hunar Hali as Dimple
- Murali Sharma as Shaunya
- Mushtaq Khan as Constable Yadav
- Mukesh Tiwari as Thanedaar
- Shakti Kapoor as Nandu Plumber
- Sonakshi Sinha in a special appearance in the songs "Party All Night" and "Har Kisi Ko"
- Prabhudeva in a special appearance in the song "Hum Na Tode"
- Yo Yo Honey Singh in a special appearance in the song "Party All Night"
- Ikka Singh in a special appearance in the song "BOSS Title Track"
- Sudesh Berry as Dushyant
- Sudesh Lehri as Metal Man
- Pradeep Kabra as Lallan, Big Boss's driver
- Sudhir Chaudhary as journalist

== Production ==
=== Development ===
Anthony D'Souza had previously directed Akshay Kumar in the 2009 film Blue, which marked his directorial debut. He and Farhad-Sajid, while unofficially adapting the 2010 Malayalam film Pokkiri Raja, chose veteran actor Amitabh Bachchan as the narrator who would introduce Boss.

According to reports Amitabh Bachchan was sent the script in advance and journalist-turned-producer Ashwin Varde (for whom the film marks his first project as a producer) offered Bachchan the role personally over a phone call which he readily accepted. Bachchan, in spite of his hectic schedule, completed the dubbing session at the earliest in merely 30 minutes. To the crew's pleasant surprise he improvised his lines as well.

=== Casting ===
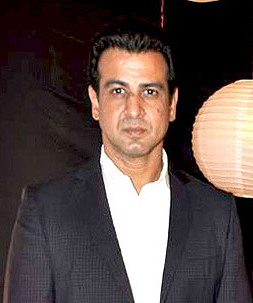
Ronit Roy, who portrays Ayushman Thakur, the film's antagonist

Akshay Kumar played a kind-hearted Haryanvi businessman, known as 'Boss', and Mithun Chakraborty enacted the role of his father. Shiv Panditt portrayed Akshay Kumar's younger brother's role and Aditi Rao Hydari is paired opposite him. Danny Denzongpa played Boss's mentor and Ronit Roy played a ruthless police officer who is pitted against Kumar. It is his first film as a direct antgonist, and also the second consecutive instance where he played a police officer, having recently starred in Shootout at Wadala wherein he played Inspector Raja Ambat, based on real-life encounter specialist Raja Tambat. Roy and Kumar, who were working together for the first time in two decades, filmed the climax in temperatures exceeding 47 degrees Celsius in Thailand, involving high-octane stunts that both actors performed successfully.

== Soundtrack ==
The soundtrack featured nine tracks composed by Meet Bros Anjjan, Yo Yo Honey Singh, P. A. Deepak and Chirrantan Bhatt with lyrics written by Kumaar, Manoj Yadav and Sahil Kaushal. Sandeep Shirodkar composed the film score. The soundtrack CD containing the songs was released on 9 September 2013 to coincide with Akshay Kumar's birthday along with the auspicious festival of Ganesh Chaturthi. T-Series acquired the film's music rights.

The soundtrack was preceded by the promotional video for the first and title track of the film "Boss Title Song" unveiled on YouTube on 30 August 2013 and subsequently for legal purchase as a soundtrack single on the digital music platform, iTunes. The second song "Party All Night" being marketed as a 'party anthem' was made on a budget in excess of ₹60 million ($1.02 million), with the fee of Sonakshi Sinha being ₹6 million ($102,393), thus making it the more expensive Bollywood music video ever shot and was released on 6 September 2013.

== Marketing ==
The pre-look poster was released on 12 August 2013, and the first look was released on 13 August 2013. Akshay Kumar released the official teaser of Boss on 14 August 2013, and was premiered with Once Upon ay Time in Mumbai Dobaara! The theatrical trailer was launched on 28 August 2013, coinciding with Krishna Janmashtami.

The star cast of Boss, Akshay Kumar, Aditi and Shiv promoted the film on the show Comedy Nights with Kapil. Akshay Kumar and comedian-actor Johnny Lever made an appearance on the longest running comedy show Comedy Circus to promote their film. Akshay Kumar promoted the film on Taarak Mehta Ka Ooltah Chashmah. Akshay will promote the film by jumping from the tallest building in Mumbai.

=== Guinness record ===
Boss entered the Guinness World Records for the largest movie poster after beating Michael Jackson's This Is It. The poster, 58.87 metres wide and 54.94 metres high, was unveiled at Little Gransden Airfield, UK, on 3 October 2013. Macro Arts (UK) handled the manufacturing; in fact, they had also made the previous Guinness record-holding poster.

== Controversy ==
An objectionable word in the song "Party All Night" from the soundtrack album was muted, after a public interest litigation seeking a stay on release of Boss was filed in Delhi High Court.

== Release ==
Boss was released on 16 October 2013 in 2750 screens worldwide, coinciding with the fourth anniversary of Blue. It was given an U/A certificate by the Censor Board for its action sequences and bikini scenes. Boss was the first Indian movie released in Latin America. It was distributed in Panama, Peru, Denmark and France in addition to the 400 screens already announced across Europe, North America, Southeast Asia and Australia. It was also released in Pakistan on the occasion of Eid al-Adha.

== Critical reception ==
The film received mixed reviews from critics.

Taran Adarsh of Bollywood Hungama gave it 4 out of 5 stars, saying that the film was "designed to magnetize lovers of desi commercial cinema and woo the BO", especially for viewers who like "old-school masaledaar entertainers".

The Times of India stated that the film is average.

Mohammad Kamran Jawaid of Dawn gave a positive review, calling it "an idiosyncratic masala fare" where "some of the (film's) in-your-face flagrancy works (and) some doesn't."
