= S. Ballesh =

Indian shehnai player

Padmashri Pandit S. Ballesh Bhajantri
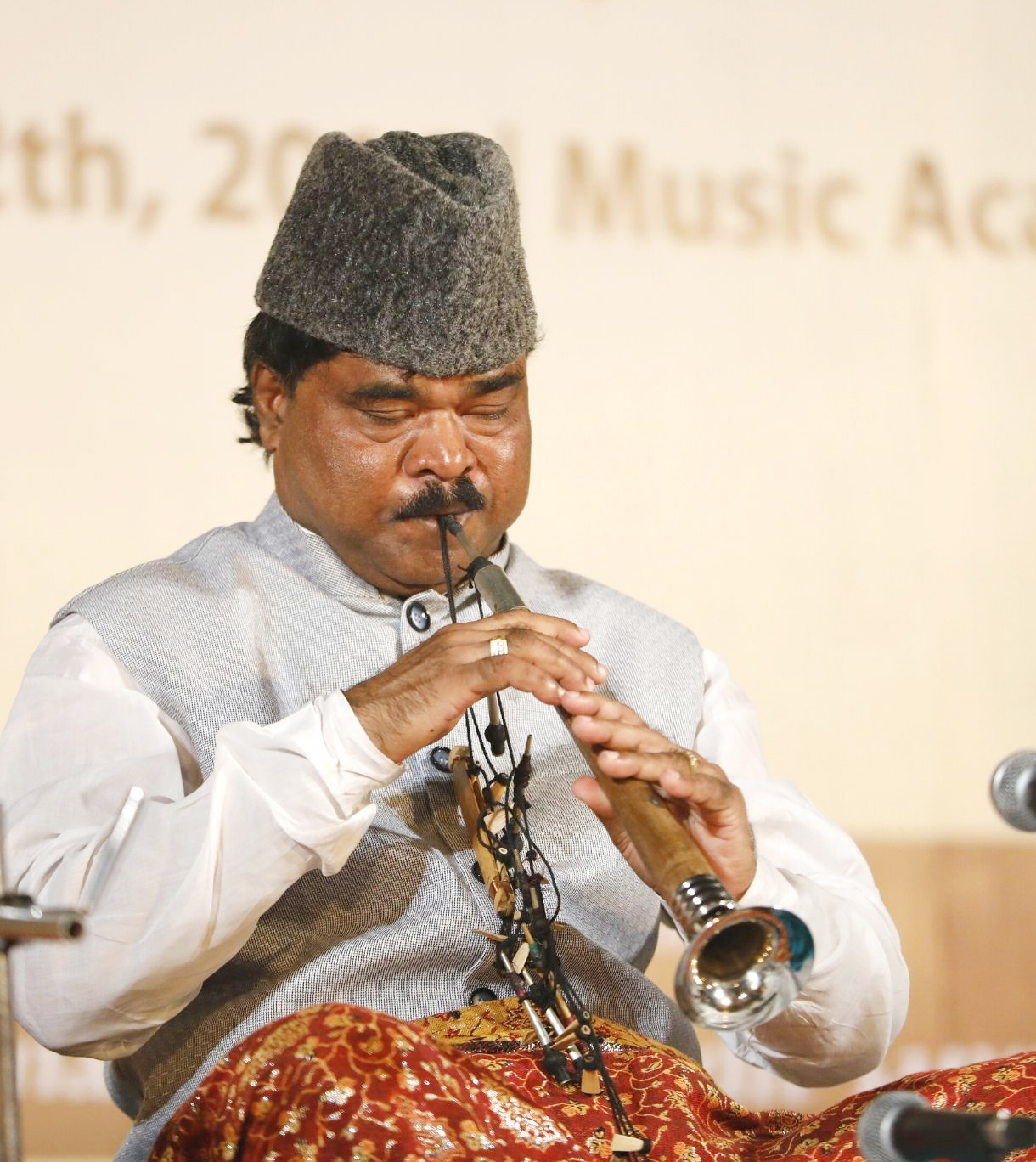
- Pandit Ballesh playing shehnai, in a tribute concert for Ustad Bismillah Khan, Chennai

Background information
- Also known as: S. Ballesh, S. Balesh, Baalesh, Ballappa, Balu
- Born: Ballappa Sanna Bharamappa Bhajantri; M.K.Hubli, Karnataka, India
- Occupations: Shehnai player, classical vocalist
- Instrument: Shehnai
- Website: shehnaiballesh.com
- Musical career
- Genres: Hindustani classical music, modern and film music, gospel
- Years active: 1970–present

Pandit S. Ballesh Bhajantri (born Ballappa Sanna Bharamappa Bhajantri) is a popular Indian classical Hindustani shehnai player. He is a disciple of shehnai player Ustad Bismillah Khan, he is benares gharana shehnai player and a patiala gharana Hindustani vocalist, ghazal singer, Indian playback singer and musician, Ballesh is credited with popularizing the shehnai, a reeded woodwind instrument. He is also a Prasar Bharati's All India Radio (AIR) and Doordarshan 'TOP' Grade shehnai artist and Hindustani vocalist.

In 2022, he was awarded India's fourth-highest civilian honour, the Padma Shri, in the field of Art. He is the second classical musician of India after Ustad Bismillah Khan to receive the award as a shehnai player. He has also worked for Ilaiyaraaja and A. R. Rahman.

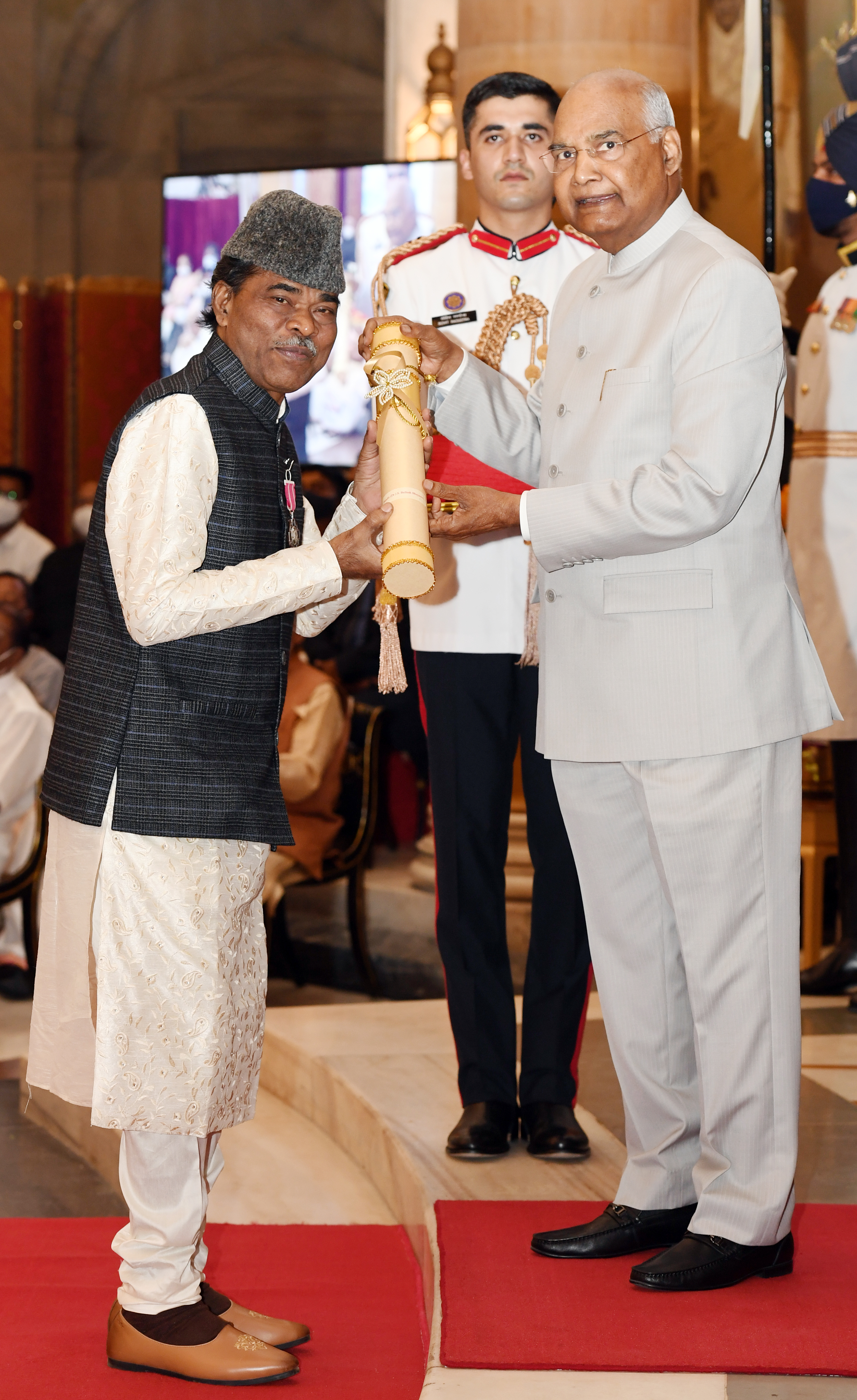
Pt Ballesh is conferred with Padmashri award by President of India, Shri. Ramnath Kovind

== Early life and education ==
Ballesh was born to Shehnai player Sanna Bharamanna and Yellamma in M.K.Hubli, Kittur, Belgaum district, Karnataka. He started learning Shehnai from his father, and later continued from his (uncle) father's elder brother Dodda Bharamanna and with musicians such as D.P. Hiremath, and Pt. Puttaraj Gawai. he was also a Bismillah Khan's disciple, Bismillah Khan once remarked that Ballesh will be the "assurance for the future of Shehnai in Indian classical music".

== Musical career ==
=== Shehnai ===
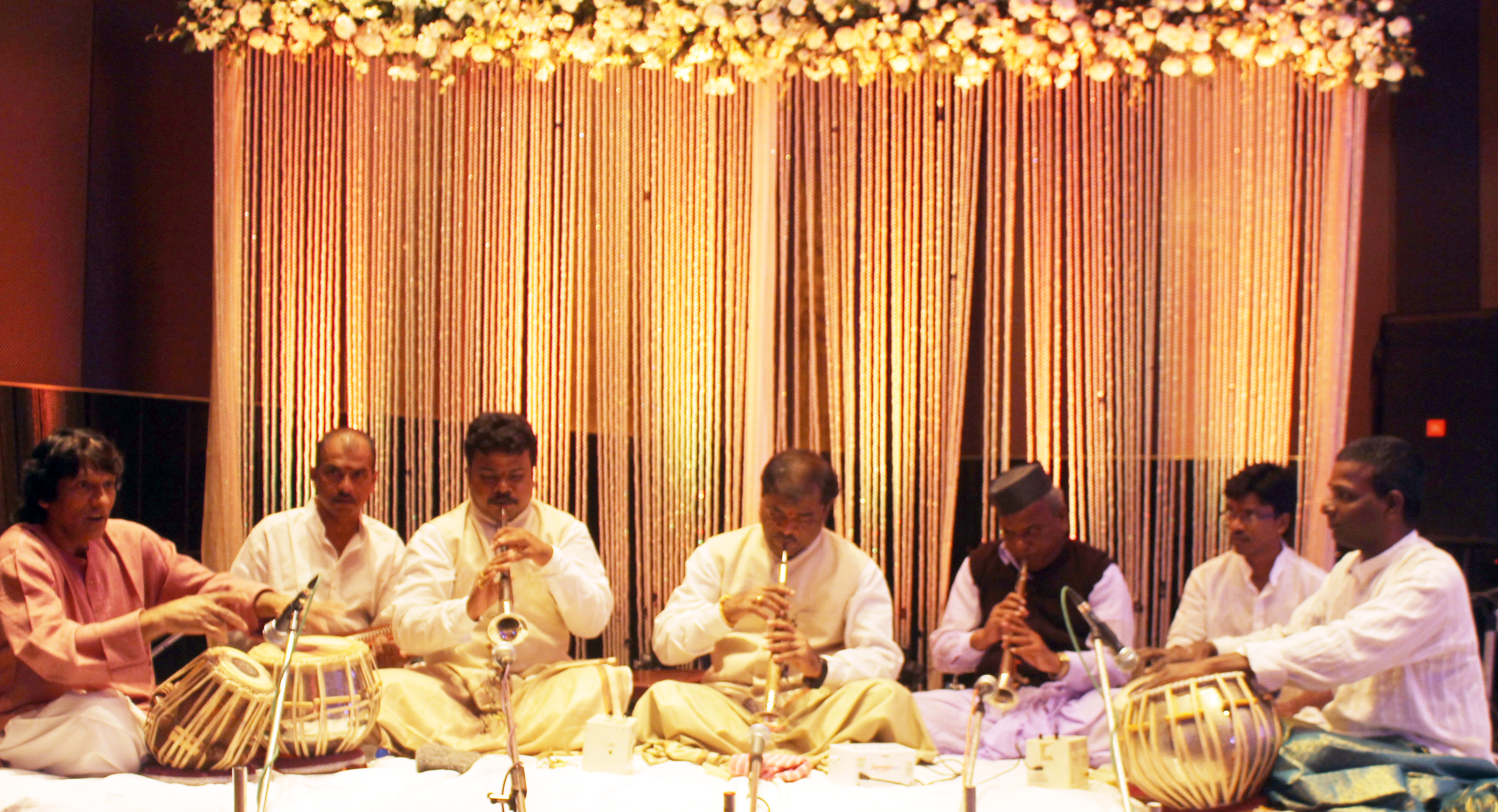
S. Ballesh and son in concert

Ballesh plays various styles on the shehnai: aalaapi and aakaar like khayal singing, jhala like sitar and sarod, tatkar like kathak dancers, meend and harquatts like sarangi and violin, and continuity tones like bansuri. He has also performed jugalbandis, along with sitarist Ustad Shahid Parvez, mohan veena player Pandit Vishwa Mohan Bhatt and accompanied by tablist Yogesh Samsi, Subhankar Banerjee. Owing to his fame, he was selected to perform for the 'Nadalahari' ceremony at Chennai's Narada Gana Sabha for the historic honour, celebrating the UNESCO’s inclusion of Chennai city in the Creative Cities Network in world’s cultural map on 8 November 2017. His music was played (in Raag Maru Bihag) on television every UNESCO International Days.

==== Performing for SPIC MACAY ====
Pandit Ballesh and party have performed for many SPIC MACAY concerts throughout india in promoting shehnai playing art and its legacy, about Indian classical music and culture in schools, colleges and in universities.

=== Film music ===
Ballesh has been a musician for many music directors in Hindi, Telugu, Malayalam, Tamil, Kannada, Bengali, Gujarati, Marathi, Rajasthani, Punjabi, Oriya, Sanskrit, English, Tulu, Konkani and Bhojpuri cinema, performing compositions by Naushad Ali, M. S. Viswanathan, Satyam (music director), G.K. Venkatesh, Ravindra Jain, Ravendra master, Ilaiyaraaja, A. R. Rahman and M. M. Keeravani. He has sung and played shehnai for more than 12,000 movies background scores and 85,000 film songs in several languages, more than 1,50,000 devotional songs for several religions and languages, he has played shehnai for more than 50,000 Swami Ayyappan songs in several languages, he has sung Hindustani music Alaaps for films, and had also collaborated on shehnai with international musicians and composers in recordings. He has sung several songs along with the singers K. J. Yesudas, S. Janaki, S. P. Balasubrahmanyam, Ilaiyaraaja, M. M. Keeravani and A. R. Rahman. Ballesh appeared playing shehnai for the Hindi film Raanjhanaa, with music by A.R. Rahman. He also played shehnai for the song "The Dichotomy of Fame" in Imtiaz Ali's 2011 Hindi film Rockstar and also played for Yeh Jo Des Hai Tera song for Hindi film Swades, with music and sung by A.R. Rahman, and also in Bigil Tamil film with music by A.R. Rahman. He also composed music for Jawan with Anirudh Ravichander. He has played for singer and music director Kailash Kher in album Jashan-e-Sufi,

=== Music Education ===
Ballesh founded Tansen Academy of Music, a school of Hindustani Classical Music, with his musical work continued by his three sons by Prakash, Krishna and Shivanand Ballesh.

== Charitable activities ==
Ballesh, along with his sons, friends and his music learning students, founded 'Tansen Academy of Music Trust' a non-profit organization established in 2011 in the memory of his gurus, which promotes Art & Culture in Chennai, Tamil Nadu The trust promotes Indian classical music, aid young artists with scholarships and provides financial help to artists in need. It also organizes various music concerts and festivals, including an annual musical fest "Ras Barse Utsav". in the memory of his father Pandit Sanna Bharamanna Bhajantri & his guru Ustad Bismillah Khan. Ballesh acts as the managing trustee. He also volunteers in organizing medical help for classical musicians and cine musicians in need of help and facilitates artistes.

== Awards and recognition ==
=== National Civilian awards ===
- 2022, Padma Shri, by Government of India

=== State Civilian awards ===
- 2023 Karnataka Rajyotsava Prashasti by Government of Karnataka
- 2021 Ustad Bismillah Khan Kala Ratna Samman (Joint Award) by India Tourism Varanasi, Government of India and by Ustad Bismillah Khans family members.
- 2020 Kalaimamani (Joint Award) by Government of Tamil Nadu
- 2019 Karnataka Kalashri by Government of Karnataka
- A "Top Grade" is the highest award given to Indian classical musicians by Prasar Bharati, Government of India's public broadcaster, through its All India Radio (AIR) and Doordarshan (DD) platforms.

=== Other awards ===
- Vishwa Kala Puraskar, 2022, by Vishwa Kala Sangama, chennai.
- Kittur Chennamma Memorial Award 2022, Karnataka State Government Award by Department of Kannada and Culture Belagavi
- Belawadi Mallamma Memorial Award 2022, Karnataka State Government Award under Department of Kannada and Culture Belagavi
- Zee Tamil TV Excellence in Music Award 2019,
- Bhimsen Samman International Award, Gadag 2017 joint award with Krishna Ballesh
- Mirchi Music Awards, 2016, Jury Award for Outstanding contribution Telugu Industry
- Sanaadi Appanna Kalashree Puraskar, 2016
- Excellence Vocational Award 2011 by Dr. M.G.R. University, during 150th birth anniversary of Rabindranath Tagore.
- Mirchi Music Awards, 2009, Jury Award for Outstanding contribution Kannada Industry

=== Recognition ===
- Honorary Doctorate from Rani Channamma University, Belagavi, Belagavi 2024.
- Honorary Doctorate from Bengaluru North University, Kolar 2022.

== Performances ==
- 2025 Performed at the 73rd Dover Lane Music Conference that held at Nazrul Mancha, Rabindra Sarobar, Kolkata
- 2024 Performed at the 70th Sawai Gandharva Bhimsen Mahotsav that held at the Maharashtra Mandal Krida Sankul, Mukund Nagar, Pune,
- 2022 Performed for Mysore Dasara Utsava that held at the Mysore Palace premises, Karnataka
- 2016 Performed for 100th birthday anniversary of Ustad Bismillah Khan
- 2016 Performed for 64th anniversary of the “Sawai Gandharva Bhimsen Mahotsav”
- 2015 Performed at the 140th Baba Harballabh Sangeet Sammelan that commenced at Shri Devi Talab Mandir, Jalandhar.
- 2006 Played a musical tribute to Krishna Hangal, daughter of Gangubai Hangal, at the presentation award ceremony for the first Krishna Hangal Memorial Award of the Hangal Music Foundation at the Sawai Gandharva Hall in Hubli.
