= Subhiksha =

Indian supermarket chain

- Company type: Discount department store
- Industry: Retail
- Founded: Chennai, India (1997)
- Number of locations: 1600 stores
- Key people: Subhendu Das
- Number of employees: 25,000
- Website: www.subhiksha.in (defunct)

Subhiksha was an Indian retail chain with 1600 outlets selling groceries, fruits, vegetables, medicines and mobile phones. It began operations in 1997, and was closed down in 2009 owing to financial mismanagement and a severe cash crunch.

Owned by R Subramanian, The company formerly known as Viswapriya Financial Services and Securities Limited. Investigators said R subramanian had collected money from the public under various schemes, including fixed deposit and debentures. Subramanian, an alumnus of Indian Institute of Technology-Madras and Indian Institute of Management-Ahmedabad, joined Citibank after his studies but quit within 15 days. He later joined Royal Enfield but quit after two years to start his own venture. His first venture was Viswapriya, a financial services company, which brought him money. He later launched Subhiksha, a retail chain.

In March 1997, Subhiksha opened its first outlet in Chennai with an initial investment of $1 million. By March 1999, the company had 14 stores in Chennai and by mid-2000, the number increased to 50. The company expanded its operation to other states and by 2006, it had 420 stores. Subhiksha had outlets in Gujarat, Delhi, Mumbai, Andhra Pradesh and Karnataka. By October 2008, the company had emerged a major player with 1,600 outlets, selling groceries, fruit, vegetables, medicines and mobile phones.

On 11 February 2009, Subhiksha announced that it would shut down all of its 1,600 outlets by May 2009.
