= M.K.Hubli =

M K Hubballi Mugut Khan Hubballi
- Town Municipal
- M K Hubballi
- Location in Karnataka, India M K Hubballi (India)
- Coordinates: 15.79°N 74.75°E
- Country: India
- State: Karnataka
- District: Belgaum
- Talukas: Kittur

Population (2001)
  - Total: 12,658

Languages
  - Official: Kannada
- Time zone: UTC+5:30 (IST)

M. K. Hubli is a village in the southern state of Karnataka, India. It is located in the Kittur taluk of Belgaum district in Karnataka. M K Hubballi's full form is Mugut Khan Hubballi

== Demographics ==
At the 2001 India census, M.K.Hubballi had a population of 12658 with 6395 males and 6263 females.

== See also ==
- Belgaum
- Districts of Karnataka
