= O Kadhal Kanmani (soundtrack) =

2015 soundtrack album by A. R. Rahman

Soundtrack album by A. R. Rahman
- Released: 3 April 2015
- Recorded: 2014–2015
- Studios: Panchathan Record Inn and AM Studios, Chennai
- Length: 44:15
- Language: Tamil
- Label: Sony Music India
- Producer: A. R. Rahman

A. R. Rahman chronology
Lingaa (2014)	O Kadhal Kanmani (2015)	Tamasha (2015)

Singles from O Kadhal Kanmani
- 1. "Mental Manadhil" Released: 15 March 2015

O Kadhal Kanmani is the soundtrack album, composed by A. R. Rahman, to the 2015 Indian Tamil film of the same name written and directed by Mani Ratnam. The soundtrack album consists of nine tracks each in original Tamil and dubbed Telugu version of the albums with one track "Maula Wa Sallim" being common to both. Majority of the tracks for the original version were penned by Vairamuthu. The lyrics to the Telugu version were written by Sirivennela Sitaramasastri.The lyrics to its Hindi version songs in its Hindi remake OK Jaanu is by Gulzar The songs are fusion of contemporary music with carnatic music as well as pure classical Indian music based songs in the genres—carnatic and Hindustani. The original score was produced by ensemble Qutb-e-Kripa along with Rahman. The score utilises the songs and re-performed carnatic compositions of musicians Tyagaraja and Annamacharya.

The male version of "Mental Manadhil" was the released as the first single from the soundtrack album. The soundtrack album was released on the midnight of 3 April 2015 by Sony Music India. Upon release, the soundtrack album garnered positive reviews from the music critics who praised the fusion of classical and contemporary genres, sync of songs with film narration and the production quality.

The soundtrack album was awarded as the "Best Tamil Album of the Year" in 2015 by Apple Music.

== Development ==
It's an extension of love. I have got everything in my life, working with Mani Ratnam and Roja (1992 film). I am still committed...OK Kanmani is a very young album. It's got very traditional kind of songs.

— A. R. Rahman, reminiscing on his collaboration with Mani Ratnam since Roja and their new film O Kadhal Kanmani.

In October 2014, it was announced that music director A. R. Rahman and lyricist Vairamuthu will compose the soundtrack in Tamil. Later, Sirivennela Sitaramasastri was opted to write lyrics for the Telugu version. In December 2014, Rahman announced that his son A. R. Ameen will be recording a song for the soundtrack. Mani Ratnam wanted an original soundtrack from Rahman that was contemporary as well as trendy. Rahman took inputs from the story and gave it a musical form. In an interview with The Hindu, lyricist Vairamuthu revealed few track names and the sounds associated with them. He called the track "Paranthu Sella Vaa" anthemic and the track "Naane Varugiren" as youthful. According to Rahman, the film's subject was "youthful" and he tried to bring that kind of feel in the songs as well. He described the tracks as 'adventurous'. Since Leela Samson plays the role of a retired old Carnatic singer in the film, there is a tinge of Carnatic music in the film. Additional compositions to the film score were done by Qutb-e-Kripa, an ensemble of musicians from A. R. Rahman's own music institute KM Music Conservatory. Rahman along with his singers have sung Carnatic compositions of musicians Tyagaraja and Annamacharya for the film score. In an interview with Deccan Chronicle, Rahman mentioned that his request to Mani Ratnam, a complete song was dropped after filming because of the explicit lyrical content.

== Composition ==
The first song composed for the film was "Mental Manadhil", which Rahman called a "light-hearted" song. For immediate filming requirements, he had co-written the track with Ratnam during Vairamuthu's absence. Rahman recalled that while writing Mental Manadhil, both he and Ratnam wanted an interesting invention of new words or phrases for the song. During their jamming sessions—Rahman was saying 'Laka Laka' to rhyme with 'Mana Mana... Manadhil...' Ratnam said 'mental' and they decided to coin 'mental' and 'manadhil' together and thus hook words were framed. Later, they interchanged a few Tamil words with their English translations. The song puts forth the desires of a young heart. The song has staccato musical articulation with upbeats. "Malargal Kaettaen" was produced next, for which the lyrics were written first. It is a Carnatic keerthanai which incorporates sounds of Tanpurakanjira and flute. The track is based on raga Bihag. Briefing on the song "Naane Varugiren", Rahman stated, "Sometimes, you have to compromise words for the sound — the sound is very important, it de-clutters from the words. People don't have as much bandwidth as before; we have to catch their attention immediately." Vairamuthu wrote an antara for the track, which, according to Rahman, had "very complicated words". Instead, Rahman and he came up with repetitive lyrics. The song is based on raag Darbari Kanada. The tune construction of the song with sangathis are complex and forced. The song expresses the glib of surrendering to love.

According to Rahman, the song "Aye Sinamika" took the longest time to get completed. It was a "soft song" that Ratnam wanted to be more energetic, on the lines of "Endrendrum Punnagai" (from Alai Payuthey) with more indipop sound to it. Although the lyrics for the song were written by Vairamuthu, Ratnam and Rahman again contributed two self-coined terms to the song: "Sinamika" and "Anadhika". The words in the song were almost incidental — the words are sounds just like the other sounds, from the instruments. In the track, almost an entire minute is filled with variations on just three words- 'Nee' 'Ennai' 'Neengaathe'. The track has more guitar sounds. Regarding "Kaara Attakkaara", which was one of the first songs to be composed, Rahman told that it was planned to be a very unconventional composition. After incorporating various ideas into the song, the original track length was 15 minutes. Later, Rahman cut it down to nearly 6 minutes. Singer Darshana recorded her parts for the song in January 2015. The lines first rehearsed were used in the trailer. She recorded for twenty minutes. Four days later, she was called in the studio to record the same rap that was sung by Aaryan Dinesh Kanagaratnam. "Parandhu Sellu Vaa" was composed using the iPad app "Loopy", which creates loops, since Ratnam wanted it to feature minimal orchestration. It is a slow, sensuous track. When the phrase "Nanaindhu Kollava" appears at the middle of the song, the minimal violin based orchestration begins and runs until the end of the track. The song has sixty odd non-repeating words. "Theera Ulaa" was composed after Rahman had seen the entire film. Singer Darshana's lines were in the classical Indian music genre. Rahman wanted her to sing with the feel of 'contentment' as if 'floating in air'. In parts, the track is laid with twangs of classical instruments. The arrangement of the track is fast-paced with all the three singers' voices vocoded. The song starts off with a lot of auto-tune but diminshes when the female vocals begin, blending of classical music.

== Critical reception ==
Srinivas Ramanujan, who wrote for The Hindu, called the album "classical yet cool" and went on to add, "This album is ample proof that the Mani Ratnam-A.R.Rahman-Vairamuthu combination is still the best in the business. The musical assortment that is Oh Kadhal Kanmani is delicious to the ear!" Nivedita Mishra for Hindustan Times showed wonder, "How A.R. Rahman and Mani Ratnam make magical music", whereas while reviewing the music in the film, critic Haricharan Pudipedi stated, "Rahman's music, needless to say, is soul-stirring, if not as standalone soundtrack but it works so well in the movie." Behindwoods called the album, "Classy and contemporary all the way", giving the album 3.75 stars out of 5. Writing for The New Indian Express, Vipin Nair noted, "Mani Ratnam still does manage to turn A R Rahman into his inventive best! The inventiveness here may not go down well in every case, but this will still remain a brilliant soundtrack." He rated the album 9 on a scale of 10. Indo-Asian News Service heaped praise on the song "Naane Varugiraen", writing that it was "one such song to which Rahman gives his pure touch with tunes that can only come from his soul" and that Rahman "creates magic" with that song, going on to call it "undoubtedly the best of the lot with "Paranthu Sella Vaa" and "Aye Sinamika" blessed by Karthik's voice following closely". Critics of BollywoodLife called the music by A. R. Rahman a big hit and commendable job done for background score. M. Suganth for The Times of India wrote, "A. R. Rahman's hip songs and background score, keeps the scenes throbbing in the film." Critic S. Saraswathi, in her review for Rediff noted, "A R Rahman has outdone himself once again. Both the background music and the songs are exhilarating and perfectly in sync with the narrative." Anupama Subramaniam of Deccan Chronicle opined that Ratnam and Rahman had created magical musical. She went on to add, "The songs ARR's songs which are already chartbusters elevate the entire proceedings." Kavitha Muralidharan for India Today summarized, "Needless to speak of the tracks that A R Rahman has come up with for his mentor. From peppy to mellifluous, Rahman has belted out numbers that makes OKK a complete if not perfect romance." Writing for Gulf News, critic Mythily Ramachandran praised the style of the song "Parandhu Sella Vaa"-its introduction and the way the song is carried on using loopy app. She called Rahman's music magical. R. S. Prakash of Bangalore Mirror wrote, "Rahman's background score is top-notch, especially in the romantic sequences."

Shankar of Oneindia Tamil noted that the soundtrack brings a feel of happiness to the heart, rewarding the album with 3.5 stars out of 5. Sify's critic Siddharth wrote, "OK Kanmani is an album that has tracks that didn't amalgamate imaginations. Being a return to roots romance movie for Mani Ratnam, the songs were expected to be simple. But ARR has delivered some of the most complex tracks in recent times and relieves himself out of his recent debacles. It is not Rahman's best but even a half blazing ARR is miles ahead of the rest." However the critic at Sify, reviewing music of the film stated, "A R Rahman's alluring music elevates the energy to the different level. Rahman has given his career best work to Ratnam." Anamika Nair based at DNA India wrote, "The legendary duo Rahman-Ratnam...come together once again and created this magic number." Baradwaj Rangan opined, "Nice-ish. That's the word I have right now for O Kadhal Kanmani. It didn't make me wince the way the soundtracks for Lingaa and Kochadaiiyaan did. It didn't activate every single one of my pleasure centres the way the soundtrack for I did. It's somewhere in the middle." However, he praised the production quality of the soundtrack album.

== Track listing ==
=== Tamil ===
No.	Title	Lyrics	Singer(s)	Length
1.	"Kaara Attakkaaraa"	Aaryan Dinesh Kanagaratnam, A. R. Rahman, Mani Ratnam	Aaryan Dinesh Kanagaratnam, Darshana KT, Shashaa Tirupati, Aalap Raju	5:41
2.	"Aye Sinamika"	Vairamuthu	Karthik	6:39
3.	"Paranthu Sella Vaa"	Vairamuthu	Karthik, Shashaa Tirupati	4:58
4.	"Mental Manadhil" (Male)	A. R. Rahman, Mani Ratnam	A. R. Rahman, Aalaap Raju, Jonita Gandhi	3:27
5.	"Naane Varugiren"	Vairamuthu	Shashaa Tirupati, Sathya Prakash	6:10
6.	"Theera Ulaa"	Vairamuthu	A. R. Rahman, Darshana KT, Nikhita Gandhi	4:51
7.	"Mental Manadhil" (Female)	A. R. Rahman, Mani Ratnam	Jonita Gandhi	3:16
8.	"Malargal Kaettaen"	Vairamuthu	K. S. Chithra, A. R. Rahman	5:58
9.	"Maula Wa Sallim"	Traditional	A. R. Ameen	3:06
Total length:				44:15

=== Telugu ===
No.	Title	Lyrics	Singer(s)	Length
1.	"Raara Aatagaada"	Aaryan Dinesh Kanagaratnam, Sirivennela Seetharama Sastry	Aaryan Dinesh Kanagaratnam, Darshana KT, Shashaa Tirupati, Aalap Raju	5:41
2.	"Aye Amayika"	Sirivennela Seetharama Sastry	Karthik	6:39
3.	"Maayedho Cheyyava"	Sirivennela Seetharama Sastry	Karthik, Shashaa Tirupati	4:58
4.	"Mental Madhilo" (Male)	Sirivennela Seetharama Sastry	Krishna Chaitanya, Jonita Gandhi	3:27
5.	"Yedho Adaganaa"	Sirivennela Seetharama Sastry	Shashaa Tirupati, Sathya Prakash	6:10
6.	"Neetho Alaa"	Sirivennela Seetharama Sastry	Karthik, Darshana KT, Maria Roe Vincent	4:51
7.	"Mental Madhilo" (Female)	Sirivennela Seetharama Sastry	Darshana KT	3:16
8.	"Manase Theeyaga"	Sirivennela Seetharama Sastry	K. S. Chithra, Dr. Narayan	5:58
9.	"Maula Wa Sallim"	Traditional	A. R. Ameen	3:06
Total length:				44:15

== Chart performance ==
Chart (2015)	Peak position
Indian Music Charts	1
Sri Lankan Music Charts	67

Singles Chart(s) (2015)	Song title	Peak position	Reference
Radio Mirchi South	Mental Manadhil	1	
Indian Music Charts	Kaara Attakkaara	1	
Indian Music Charts	Aye Sinamika	3	
Indian Music Charts	Theera Ulaa	4	
Indian Music Charts	Malargal Kaettaen	5	
Indian Music Charts	Naane Varugiraen	6	
Indian Music Charts	Parandhu Sella Vaa	7	
Indian Music Charts	Maula Wa Sallim	8	
Indian Music Charts	Mental Manadhil (female)	9	

== Release history ==
Album	Country	Date	Format	Label	Catalogue no.	Ref
"O Kadhal Kanmani"	India	3 April 2015	Digital download	Sony Music India	—N/a	
"O Kadhal Kanmani"	Australia	3 April 2015	Digital download	Sony Music Entertainment	—N/a	
"O Kadhal Kanmani"	UAE	3 April 2015	Digital download	Sony Music Entertainment	—N/a	
"O Kadhal Kanmani"	Germany	3 April 2015	Digital download	Sony Music Entertainment	—N/a	
"O Kadhal Kanmani"	India	4 April 2015	CD, Digital download	Sony Music India	B00V4OMERI	
"O Kadhal Kanmani"	United States	6 April 2015	CD, Digital download	Sony Music Entertainment	B00V4OMERI	
"O Kadhal Kanmani"	United Kingdom	6 April 2015	CD, Digital download	Sony Music Entertainment	B00VSPG6FY	
"OK Bangaram"	India	3 April 2015	Digital download	Sony Music India	—N/a	
"OK Bangaram"	United States	3 April 2015	Digital download	Sony Music Entertainment	—N/a	
"OK Bangaram"	United Kingdom	3 April 2015	Digital download	Sony Music Entertainment	—N/a	
"OK Bangaram"	United States	6 April 2015	CD	Sony Music Entertainment	B00WNE6N0M	
"OK Bangaram"	United Kingdom	6 April 2015	CD	Sony Music Entertainment	B00VSPB4NI	

== Album credits ==
Credits adapted from A. R. Rahman's official website.

=== Original soundtrack ===
Backing Vocals

Shashwat, Deepak, Anand, Shenbagaraj, Santosh, Maalavika, Veena, Shashwathi, Sowmya Raoh, Soundarya, Nivas, Sivakumar, Dhana, Raveena Ravi, Srinidhi

Personnel

- Guitars: Keba Jeremiah
- Bass guitars: Keith Peters
- Flute: Naveen Kumar
- Tampura: Balasubramaniam
- Veena: Devi
- Ghatam, Kanjira: Selva Ganesh
- Indian Rhythm: Raju, Laxminarayan, Kaviraj

Production

- Producer: A. R. Rahman
- Mastering: R. Nitish Kumar
- Mastering for iTunes: S. Sivakumar
- Vocal Supervision: Dr. Narayan, Shiraz Uppal
- Chennai Strings Orchestra & The Sunshine Orchestra: V. J. Srinivasamurthy (AM Studios, Chennai)
- Engineers:
  - Suresh Permal, Vinay Sridhar, Srinidhi Venkatesh, T. R. Krishna Chetan, Jerry Vincent, Hentry Kuruvilla, Vinay S. Hariharan(Panchathan Record Inn, Chennai)
  - S. Sivakumar, Pradeep, Kannan Ganpat, Karthik Sekaran, Anantha Krishnan (AM Studios, Chennai)
- Mixing: P. A. Deepak, T. R. Krishna Chetan
- Additional Programming: T. R. Krishna Chetan, Ishaan Chhabra, Jerry Vincent
- Music co-ordinators: Noell James, Vijay Iyer
- Musicians' fixer: R. Samidurai

=== Original score ===
==== Personnel ====
- Hindustani vocals: Dr. Shruthi Jauhari, Madhumitha Ravikumar, Nakul Abhyankar
- Carnatic vocals: Anuradha Sriram, Bombay Sisters
- Additional vocals: Shashaa Tirupathi, Arpita Gandhi, Maalvika
- Tabla: Rajesh Dhavle
- Flute: Kamalakar
- Tanpura: Madhumitha Ravikumar
- Band: New Gulab Punjab band
- Chennai Strings Orchestra conducted by V. J. Srinivasamurthy & Prabhakaran (at Panchathan Record Inn, Chennai)

==== Production ====
- Music producers: Qutub-e-Kripa
- Background score pre-mixing: Hentry Kuruvilla (at Qutub-e-Kripa)
- Music supervisor: Srinidhi Venkatesh
- Project manager: Suresh Permal
