= Lingaa (soundtrack) =

- Soundtrack album cover

Soundtrack album by A. R. Rahman
- Released: 5 November 2014
- Recorded: 2014; Panchathan Record Inn and AM Studios, Chennai; NYSA Studios, Mumbai; Premier Digital Mastering Studios, Mumbai
- Language: Tamil
- Labels: Sony Music India; Eros Music
- Producer: A. R. Rahman

A. R. Rahman chronology
| I (2014) | Lingaa (2014) | O Kadhal Kanmani (2015) |
External audio
- Audio Jukebox on YouTube

Lingaa is the soundtrack album composed by A. R. Rahman, to the 2014 Indian Tamil film of the same name written and directed by K. S. Ravikumar. The soundtrack album consists of five tracks, out of which, four had lyrics by Vairamuthu while the fifth was written by his son Madhan Karky. According to Rahman, as the film is set in different time zones, the music composed works around these time.

== Development ==
According to Rahman, Rajinikanth did not want to include the first version of the song "Oh Nanba" in the film as he felt that it was more of a song suited for a younger generation actor. Rahman, as a result, reworked the entire song to suit Rajinikanth. The song, which was the introduction song in the film and was the last song to be recorded, was a combination of tunes similar to those composed by M. S. Viswanathan, and of EDM genre of music. For the song, "En Mannava", Rahman tried to compose it in the Hindustani classical genre using different ragas like Bilaskhani Todi and Durbari, but the film's director, K. S. Ravikumar, insisted that the song, which is a period song in the pre-independence portions of the film, should have a contemporary feel so as to make the audience like it. Hence Rahman made it as a folk song. The track "Indiane Vaa" was originally sung by Haricharan and Rahman liked Haricharan's rendition of the song and said the same about it to Ravikumar, who said that Rahman himself should sing the song as he felt that it suited Rahman's style of singing. Rahman agreed to Ravikumar's suggestion and sang the final version of the song himself. The song "Mona Gasolina" was in the genre of Latin American music. For the track "Unmai Oru Naal", Rahman composed seven tunes for Ravikumar to choose. In the scene where Raja Lingeshwaran hosts a party inviting the governor, and speaks to him, the piano cover is the composition of Wolfgang Amadeus Mozart's Piano Sonata 11 in A Major K.33.

== Reception ==
The soundtrack received mixed reviews upon released mainly praising "Indiane Vaa" but criticizing other songs. Uma Sudhir of NDTV stated, "Music by AR Rahman is not really soul-stirring except the song "Indiane Vaa". Some frames in the song sequences remind you of scenes from earlier films. The Mona song with Anushka has a nice lilt." Reviewing for Hindustan Times, Gautham Bhaskaran felt, "AR Rahman's music does not help...to stop Lingaa from stumbling on its plot track." T.S. Sudhir of India Today noted, "For the Rajini-Rahman team that gave hit music in Sivaji, Enthiran, this film doesn't match up. Music by A R Rahman is a letdown. Except for the "Indiane Vaa" score sung by AR himself, rest of the music is disappointing." Critics from Indo Asian News Service raised the similar concern writing, "A.R Rahman's music, doesn't touch the bar that he had set with his previous collaborations with the superstar (Rajinikanth)." Bodrul Chaudhury of Bollyspice who reviewed the Hindi version of the soundtrack stated, "The music wasn't as strong as what we normally hear from Rahman. Overall, this is an album which had the potential to be so much better." Siddharth K of Sify felt that the album was "highly underwhelming". He noted that every song’s genre was almost similar to a template and called the album "nowhere near Rahman's best". Behindwoods ystated, "With Rahman experimenting to give period specific music, Lingaa isn't the usual easily accessible Rajinikanth album. Time and visuals might give a different perspective." Saisuresh Sivaswami of Rediff claimed, "It is sacrilege to criticise A. R. Rahman’s music, but of the five songs in the film, only one, Indianey Vaa, had the anthem potential, the others being just about fine. The songs don’t jump out and grab you by the throat." Sangeetha Devi Dundoo of The Hindu praised the song "Mona Gasolina", calling it "edgy and good". Also writing for The Hindu, S. Shiva Kumar called Rahman's songs and background score "unbelievably prosaic". R. S. Prakash in Bangalore Mirror summarized, "Rahman's music is a far cry from his usual compositions, and it's one of the biggest let-downs in the film. Even the introductory song of Rajinikanth creates no impact." J. Hurtado of Twitch Film said "The music by AR Rahman in the film seems to fall flat, with the exceptions of perhaps Rajini's intro song, "Oh Nanba", Anushka's lovelorn dream suite "Mona Gasolina", and Sonakshi's paean to Rajini, "En Mannavva"."

On the contrary, Anupama Subramanian for Deccan Chronicle wrote, "One usually finds Rahman's background score to be pretty good, and you may find it to be the case here as well and his tunes (a)re catchy." Critic based at The Times of India who reviewed the Telugu version of the soundtrack claimed, "On the whole, the album features a blend of melodious and peppy tunes." Bollywoodlife reviewed the album thus "Lingaa music review: AR Rahman dishes out a musical treat for all Rajinikanth fans."

== Release ==
The soundtrack of the original version was unveiled on 5 November 2014 by hosting a promotional event at Sathyam Cinemas in Chennai with Rajinikanth, Anushka Shetty, Sonakshi Sinha and K. S. Ravikumar in attendance. Rahman could not attend the launch; a video where he spoke about the film was screened. The Telugu version was unveiled officially on 8 November 2014 by hosting a promotional event at Park Hyatt, Novotel in Hyderabad which was followed by the film's curtain-raiser. Chiranjeevi and K. Viswanath were invited as the chief guests. MAA TV televised the curtain raiser live from 5:00 PM. The album for the Hindi version was unveiled on 26 November 2014; prior to its release, five days before, a single track "India Re" (Indiane Vaa) was released on 21 November 2014.

== Marketing ==
A 40-second song teaser of "Mona Gasolina" featuring Rajinikanth and Anushka Shetty was released on 7 November 2014. Another 40-second song teaser was released on 8 November 2014 of the song "En Mannavva" featuring Rajinikanth and Sonakshi Sinha.

== Track listing ==
=== Original Version ===
Track listing was released by A. R. Rahman's official website on 2 November 2014.

All lyrics are written by Vairamuthu, except where noted.

| No. | Title | Singer(s) | Length |
|---|---|---|---|
| 1. | "Oh Nanba" | S. P. Balasubrahmanyam, Aaryan Dinesh Kanagaratnam | 04:24 |
| 2. | "En Mannava" | Srinivas, Aditi Paul | 04:44 |
| 3. | "Indiane Vaa" | A. R. Rahman | 06:00 |
| 4. | "Mona Gasolina" (Lyricist:Madhan Karky) | Mano, Neeti Mohan, Tanvi Shah | 05:53 |
| 5. | "Unmai Orunaal Vellum" | Haricharan | 05:21 |
| Total length: | | | 26:35 |

=== Hindi Version ===
All lyrics are written by Gulzar.

| No. | Title | Singer(s) | Length |
|---|---|---|---|
| 1. | "Ranga Ranga" | S. P. Balasubrahmanyam, Jaspreet Jasz | 04:26 |
| 2. | "Chalke Re" | Srinivas, Aditi Paul | 04:47 |
| 3. | "India Re" | Javed Ali | 06:05 |
| 4. | "Mona Gasolina" | S. P. Balasubrahmanyam, Neeti Mohan | 05:54 |
| 5. | "Din Dooba Hai" | Haricharan | 05:24 |
| Total length: | | | 26:46 |

=== Telugu Version ===
| No. | Title | Lyrics | Singer(s) | Length |
|---|---|---|---|---|
| 1. | "Vo Rabba Rabba" | Chandrabose | S. P. Balasubrahmanyam | 04:26 |
| 2. | "Vo Manmadhaa" | Anantha Sriram | Srinivas, Aditi Paul | 04:48 |
| 3. | "Indian Ni Raa" | Vanamali | Haricharan | 06:03 |
| 4. | "Monaa Monaa" | Kandhikonda | S. P. Balasubrahmanyam, Neeti Mohan | 05:54 |
| 5. | "Sathyam Shivamu" | Suddala Ashok Teja | Haricharan | 05:22 |
| Total length: | | | | 26:39 |

== Charts ==
| Charts | Song title | Peak position | Reference |
|---|---|---|---|
| Radio Mirchi South | Mona Gasolina | 1 | |
| Radio Mirchi South | En Mannava | 5 | |
| Radio Mirchi South | Indiane Vaa | 6 | |
| Radio Mirchi South | Oh Nanba | 4 | |

== Album credits ==
Credits adapted from A. R. Rahman's official website.

Backing Vocals

Dr. Narayan, Nivas, Santhosh, Deepak, Arjun Chandy, Yazin, Pooja, Maalavika, Sowmya Raoh, Soundarya, Nirjari, Veena, Arpita, Maria Roe Vincent, Varsha, Surbhi, Shashaa Tirupati, Debolina Bose, Swagatha Sundar & K.M.M.C. Choir

Personnel

- Guitars: Keba Jeremiah
- Sarangi: Dilshad Khan
- Shehnai: Balesh
- Sitar: Asad Khan
- Dilruba: Saroja
- Woodwinds: Kamlakhar
- Indian Rhythm: T. Raja, Kumar, Neelakandan, Raju, Laxminarayan, Vedachalam Venkat, Kaviraj, Sai Shravanam, Satyanarayana

On the track "En Mannavaa"

- Additionally arrangements: Ranjit Barot
- Additional arrangements and programming: Aditya Paudwal
- Percussion: Arun Solanki, Aditya Paudwal
- Chorus: Varsha Tripathi, Surbhi Dahsputra, Sashaa Thirupati, Debolina Bose
- Recording Engineer: Puneet Samtani
- Assistant Engineer: Vimal Pancholi
- Musician Coordinator: Vimal Pancholi, Sanjay Utekar

On the track "Oh Nanba"

- Brass Section: Blasco Monsorat. Kishore Sodha, Raghav Sachar
- Brass conductor: Raghav Sachar
- Recording Engineers - Muralidhar Praveen, Aditya Modi (Recorded at NYSA & PDMS studios, Mumbai)

Production

- Producer: A. R. Rahman
- Mastering: Donal Whelan and Gethin John (at Hafod Mastering studios)
- Chennai Strings Orchestra & The Sunshine Orchestra: V. J. Srinivasamurthy (at AM Studios, Chennai)
- Engineers:
  - Suresh Permal, Vinay Sridhar, Srinidhi Venkatesh & Nitish Kumar (at Panchathan Record Inn, Chennai)
  - Sivakumar, Pradeep, Kannan, Karthik, Ananthakrishnan (at AM Studios, Chennai)
- Mixing: P. A. Deepak
- Additional Programming: Ranjit Barot, P. A. Deepak, T. R. Krishna Chetan, Hentry Kuruvilla, Ishaan Chhabra, Santhosh Kumar Dayanidhi, Marc
- Music co-ordinators: Noell James, Vijay Iyer
- Musicians' fixer: R. Samidurai
