= Kaatru Veliyidai (soundtrack) =

2017 soundtrack album by A. R. Rahman

Soundtrack album by A. R. Rahman
- Released: 20 March 2017
- Recorded: 2016–2017
- Studios: Panchathan Record Inn and AM Studios, Chennai
- Genre: Feature film soundtrack
- Length: 25:23
- Language: Tamil
- Label: Sony Music India
- Producer: A. R. Rahman

A. R. Rahman chronology
OK Jaanu (2017)	Kaatru Veliyidai (2017)	Sachin: A Billion Dreams (2017)

Singles from Kaatru Veliyidai
- 1. "Azhagiye" Released: 2 February 2017; 2. "Vaan" Released: 14 February 2017; 3. "Saarattu Vandiyila" Released: 1 March 2017

Kaatru Veliyidai is the soundtrack album, composed by A. R. Rahman, to the 2017 Indian Tamil romance film of the same name, written and directed by Mani Ratnam starring Karthi and Aditi Rao Hydari. The soundtrack album consists of six tracks each, in the original Tamil, and in the Telugu version of the album. Four of the tracks for the original version were penned by Vairamuthu, one by his son Madhan Karky, and one by Shellee. The lyrics to the Telugu version were written by Sirivennela Sitaramasastri. The album won Rahman the National Film Award for Best Music Direction in the "Songs" category at the 65th National Film Awards. The choreography for the songs were done by Brinda and the cinematography for the film by Ravi Varman.

== Development ==
In late 2016, Vairamuthu, the lyricist for this soundtrack revealed that this album would have seven songs, but the original album could only retain six tracks. In the song Tango Kelaayo, it was Haricharan himself who had sung the female portion, with his vocal format and pitch tweaked to modulate like a young sensuous female. A. R. Rahman also said in an interview to The Hindu that Tango Kelaayo was the song from the album that took the most time to be produced/composed. When Diwakar was called to sing, he was only given a small part. But later, impressed by his singing, Rahman decided to use him for the whole song; revealed Diwakar this in an interview to Behindwoods. When the song "Vaan" was being composed, Rahman had recorded it only with the keyboard for the BGM along with Tirupati’s voice, to which Ratnam agreed. Later, Rahman added the flute bit to the song after Ratnam had actually shot it in Belgrade, Serbia. Rahman also stated that a few portions of the background score were composed in London. The song "Jugni" was sung by Indian Idol 2017 contestant Tejinder Singh (the Punjabi portions alone). This, he revealed on his Twitter page. The trailer, which was unveiled by Mani Ratnam and A. R. Rahman on 9 March, had the unreleased track "Tango Kelaayo"'s bgm and "Jugni" playing in the background. The theatrical print also had the track "Anbay" playing in the background, sung by Rahman himself, and the song "Vaan (unplugged)" sung by Shashaa Tirupati, both not included in the original motion picture soundtrack album.

== Marketing ==
A musical glimpse of the film was released on 26 January 2017, and it was announced that the first single will be released on 2 February 2017. A short teaser of the song "Azhagiye" was released on 1 February 2017, and the full song was released the later day. The Telugu version of the song, titled "Hamsaro" was released on the same day. The lyric video reached 1 million views within 24 hours of its upload. "Azhagiye", featuring the voices of Arjun Chandy, Haricharan and Jonita Gandhi, and lyrics by Madhan Karky (his second collaboration with Ratnam after Kadal) seems to be a breezy number from A. R. Rahman. The full song (Tamil and Telugu version) has been released on Wynk Music for Android users and on iTunes for Apple users. The second single track "Vaan" was released on 14 February 2017, coinciding with the Valentine's Day. Before the single release, a promo of the song was released on 13 February 2017, on YouTube. It was released in Telugu as "Maimaruppaa" on the same day. The third single track "Sarattu Vandiyila" was launched on 1 March 2017 at midnight, also in Telugu. The song is similar to the Malayalam song "Thannakkam Tharoo" from Breaking News Live (2013), which itself is similar to the song "Alangatti Mazhai" from Thenali (2000), which was composed by Rahman.

== Release ==
The soundtrack album of the Tamil version was released on 20 March 2017 in the presence of actors Suriya and Sivakumar coming as a special guest at the Sathyam Cinemas, Chennai. The soundtrack of the Telugu version was released by Mani Ratnam and A. R. Rahman on 24 March 2017, at a promotional event held in Hyderabad.

== Track listing ==
The tracklist was released on 18 March 2017 by Madras Talkies on their Twitter account.

All lyrics are written by Vairamuthu, except where noted.

Kaatru Veliyidai - Tamil
No.	Title	Lyrics	Singer(s)	Length
1.	"Nallai Allai"		Sathya Prakash, Chinmayi Sripada	3:59
2.	"Azhagiye" (Punjabi lyrics: Navneet Virk)	Madhan Karky	Arjun Chandy, Haricharan, Jonita Gandhi	3:44
3.	"Vaan Varuvaan"		Shashaa Tirupati	4:15
4.	"Saarattu Vandiyile"		A. R. Reihana, Nikhita Gandhi, Tippu	4:44
5.	"Tango Kelaayo"		Haricharan, Diwakar	4:50
6.	"Jugni"	Shellee	A. R. Rahman, Tejinder Singh, Raja Kumari (Rap vocals), Shikara	5:03
Total length:				25:23

All lyrics are written by Sirivennela Seetharama Sastry, except where noted.

Cheliyaa - Telugu
No.	Title	Lyrics	Singer(s)	Length
1.	"Allei Allei"		Abhay Jodhpurkar, Chinmayi Sripada	3:59
2.	"Hamsaro" (Punajbi lyrics: Navneet Virk)		Arjun Chandy, Haricharan, Jonita Gandhi	3:45
3.	"Maimarupaa"		Shashaa Tirupati	4:15
4.	"Morethukuchindi"		A. R. Reihana, Nikhita Gandhi, Tippu	4:44
5.	"Tango Kalalo"		Hriday Gattani, Tanvi Shah	4:50
6.	"Jugni"	Shellee	A. R. Rahman, Tejinder Singh, Raja Kumari (Rap vocals), Shikara	5:03
Total length:				25:21

== Reception ==
The album received very positive response from critics.

Professional ratings
Review scores
Source	Rating
Hindustan Times	4.5/5 stars
Sify	4/5 stars
Musicaloud	3.5/5 stars
Deccan Chronicle	3/5 stars

Hindustan Times gave the album 4.5 out of 5 stating "The composer has taken us back to the magical ‘90s, where he used to hit the bull’s eye with every given album." Sify gave the album 4 out of 5 stating "‘Kaatru Veliyidai’ marks the 25th year for AR Rahman in the Tamil music scene. That, invariably means it has been 25 years since Mani & Rahman joined hands for the first time. The duo still has enough gas in them to surprise us and deliver an album that could make us look back and take notice. The best tracks in the album are already popular and that has indeed raised the stakes of the film. Fresh effervescence, stamp of authority, signature style, foot tapping numbers, and simple yet experimental tunes – the album ticks most boxes easily. It is very hard to not like this. And, guess what? The social media is going ballistic." Music Aloud gave the album 3.5 out of 5, stating "Kaatru Veliyidai has some good music, but, as a soundtrack, is not up to ARR-Mani Ratnam standards." Deccan Chronicle gave the album 3 out of 5 stating "‘Kaatru Veliyidai’ might not be Rahman's best of works, but it still reiterates his unparalleled, orchestral charm and gives you that Déjà vu, you so often have been craving. At that, it excels, and how!" Milliblog commented it as "In the 25th year of their collaboration, Mani and Rahman prove that the spark is alive and kicking." The Quint commented it as "‘Kaatru Veliyidai’ proves, yet again, that AR Rahman seldom shies away from experimenting with unexplored melodies."

== Awards ==
- 65th National Film Awards
1. National Film Award for Best Music Direction - A.R.Rahman
2. National Film Award for Best Female Playback Singer- Shashaa Tirupati for Vaan Varuvaan
- Filmfare Awards South
1. Filmfare Award for Best Lyricist - Tamil - Vairamuthu for Vaan Varuvaan
2. Filmfare Award for Best Female Playback Singer - Tamil - Shashaa Tirupati for Vaan

== Album credits ==
Credits adapted from info published in the official CD cover.

Backing vocals

Song	Singers
"Nallai Allai" "Allei Allei"	Arjun Chandy
"Azhagiye" "Hamsaro"	Sid Sriram, Bawa Sahni, Keerthi Sagathia
"Vaan" "Maimarupaa"	Arjun Chandy, Poorvi Koutish
"Saarattu Vandiyila"	Arjun Chandy, Nivas, Santhosh, Aparna, Deepti Suresh, Abhay Jodhpurkar
"Morethukuchindi"	Sowmiya, Deepthi, Jahnavi Aradhyula, Veena, Soundarya, Triya, Sushma, Nivas, Deepak, Sathya Prakash, Shenbagaraj

Personnel

Song	Personnel
"Nallai Allai" "Allei Allei"	Guitar: Keba Jeremiah; Shehnai: Balesh
"Azhagiye" "Hamsaro"	Guitar: Keba Jeremiah; Strings: Murali, Mohan, Basker, John
"Vaan" "Maimarupaa"	Flute: Kiran
"Saarattu Vandiyila" "Morethukuchindi"	Flute: Kamalakar; Guitar: Keba Jeremiah, Chris Jason; Percussions: T.Raja, Kumar, Yash; Mandolin: Subhani; Santoor: Subhani; Saz: Lokesh; Ukulele: Lokesh
"Tango Kelaayo" "Tango Kalalo"	Accordion: Karthik Devaraj

Production

- Producer: A. R. Rahman
- Mastering: Suresh Permal
- Mastering for iTunes: S. Sivakumar
- Additional Programming: Ishaan Chhabra (for Azhagiye, Vaan, Tango Kelaayo, Tango Kalalo), Jim Sathya (for Tango Kelaayo and Tango Kalalo), T. R. Krishna Chetan (for Hamsaro)
- Engineers (Panchathan Record Inn, Chennai): Suresh Permal, Srinidhi Venkatesh, Karthik Sekaran, Vinay Sridhar, Ishaan Chhabra, Jim Sathya
- Engineers (AM Studios, Chennai): S. Sivakumar, Kannan Ganpat, Pradeep, Anantha Krishnan, Manoj, Srinath

Additional Vocal Supervision: VJ Srinivasa Murthy

- Mixing: T. R. Krishna Chetan
- Musicians' co-ordinators: Vijay Iyer, T. M. Faizuddin
- Musicians' fixer: R. Samidurai
- Chennai Strings and Sunshine Orchestra- conducted by VJ Srinivasamurthy at AM Studios, Chennai
