= Legally Veer =

2025 Indian Telugu language film

- Poster
- Directed by: Ravi Gogula
- Starring: Malikireddy Veer Reddy; Priyanka Rewri
- Release date: 7 March 2025
- Country: India
- Language: Telugu

Legally Veer is a 2025 Indian Telugu language film directed Ravi Gogula. The film stars Malikireddy Veer Reddy, Priyanka Rewri in the lead role.

== Cast ==
- Malikireddy Veer Reddy as Veer
- Priyanka Rewri as Priya
- Thanuja Puttaswamy
- Delhi Ganesh as Veer's father
- Leela Samson
- Vinod Varma
- Veera Shankar
- Baby Shaanya
- Dayanand Reddy
- S Ram
- Madhu Ramchandran
- Esabella
- Jaya Rao

== Reception ==
Abhishek Srivastava of The Times of India said that "The film could have been a sharper and more intense legal drama had director Ravi Gogula avoided certain distractions. The inclusion of songs disrupts the film's momentum, acting as unnecessary detours in an otherwise taut narrative. While not without its flaws, 'Legally Veer' remains an engaging legal drama that keeps audiences invested with its well-crafted story, strong performances, and gripping courtroom sequences." Telangana Today said that "The film may not boast groundbreaking cinematography like commercial hits, but the strong story and engaging narration keep viewers hooked."
