= Joyce K. Paul =

Indian Bharatanatyam dancer and exercise physiologist

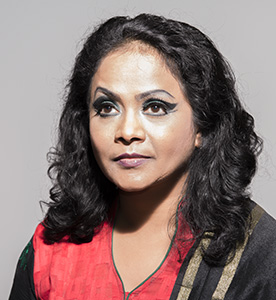
- Paul in 2014
- Born: New Delhi, India
- Education: Doctorate in Exercise Physiology (Physical Anthropology)
- Alma mater: University of Delhi, Kalakshetra
- Occupations: dancer, choreographer, professor, ethnographer, UX design researcher
- Years active: 1990- Present
- Known for: using dance as a modality for social awareness, mental health advocacy, community engagement
- Website: www.joycekpaul.com www.arpanarts.org

Joyce Kakariyil Paul is a Bharatanatyam dancer, exercise physiologist, and anthropologist from India. Classically trained in Bharatanatyam from Kalakshetra, she is known for her technical acumen, rigour, and precision. Paul had her initial dance training under Padmashri Leela Samson and further training under Prof C.V. Chandrasekhar and Janardhanan Sir among others. She has trained in Mohiniattam, the classical dance of Kerala. In 2003, she founded Arpan Performing Arts, an organization dedicated to promoting the folk and classical traditions of India, where she currently serves as its creative director.

== Education and training ==
Paul received her dance training under Bharatanatyam guru, Leela Samson, Prof. J.Janardhanan and Prof C. V. Chandrashekaran at Kalakshetra.

She started her college education with an Honours degree in zoology with specialization in Reproductive Biology while Masters saw her move on to studying the evolution of man in time and space. She completed her PhD in Exercise Physiology from the Department of Anthropology, University of Delhi, during which she specialized in the anthropology of performance. She published papers on 'Dance Related Injuries Among Bharatnatyam Dancers' and also on 'Pattern of Subcutaneous Fat Distribution, Its Variation with Age Among Young Rajput Females of Pauri Garhwal, India.' Her thesis is the first scientific study of Bharatanatyam dancers in India. Her publications have been included in JOPERD, Indian Anthropologist, Femina, Nation and the World, and the Journal of Human Ecology/

She is also a certified Instructional Designer with additional SEI-CMM Level 5 and ISO 9001 certification. In 2010, Paul further completed certificates in basic broadcasting and community radio journalism. In 2019 she successfully completed an executive program in "Mastering Design Thinking" from the MIT Sloane School of Business.

== IT industry career ==
Paul spent about 15 years of her corporate career working for NIIT India Ltd and Microsoft Corporation as an Instructional Designer, Content Publisher, User Researcher and Business Intelligence Analyst.

== Dance/performing arts career ==
She started her teaching career by teaching private Bharatanatyam classes as early as 1990 with the blessings of her Guru (Padmashri) Leela Samson. She taught classes to corporate clients during the years 1996 to 1998 doing seminars on communication using dance as a body language. She has also assisted teaching (Bharatanatyam classes) at Kalashram Trust, New Delhi, founded and directed by Kathak exponent Pandit Birju Maharaj.

After moving to Redmond, Washington to join Microsoft in 2001, she founded her own dance company called Arpan Performing Arts. Her mission focuses on building awareness through the performing arts about social issues such as nature conservancy, domestic violence, mental health, and body image. Involved in outreach, she has partnered with local organizations such as the Kirkland Performance Center, Seattle Art Museum, Seattle Town Hall, Tasveer, Pratidhwani, Ragamala, and Northwest FolkLife. She created and curated the "Incredible Dances of India" for Seattle's Northwest Folklife Festival, which is running now in its sixth season. She was the first Indian-American Bharatanatyam Dancer to be featured in Seattle's Town Hall. This achievement is commemorated with a permanent signed poster which sits on the walls of Seattle's Town Hall.

Paul has performed extensively over the last 17 years. In 2003, she performed in "Dance to the Music" at Town Hall, In 2004 and 2007, she performed at Utsav and she also performed for Seattle's Partners in Preservation Initiative

She was selected to be an invited choreographer at the Seattle ACT theater's rendition of the Ramayana in September 2012 and performed at a fundraising event in efforts to help save the Heritage Building of Town Hall. She shares her thoughts about choreography as a process in an interview at Penn State's Sangeet Samvad.

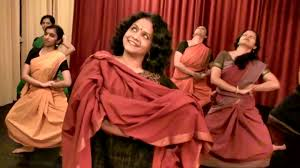
Dr. Paul during rehearsals for her 2014 production, Yavanika

Paul presented a poster at the 4th National Dance Association conference on Pedagogy, Wellness, and Healing in July 2012 titled "Healing through Angika Abhinaya and Rasanubhava" (Virginia, USA). She served as a presenter and guest speaker at the Dance and the Child International conference (daCi) in 2014.

In the last ten years, Paul has served as a guest lecturer at the University of Washington and as an adjunct faculty member at Cornish College of the Arts and as faculty for the Academy Program at the Spectrum Dance Theatre. She was featured among the top 7 artists selected in a University of Washington Oral History project focusing on preserving the performing arts among the South Asian Community which premiered on 9 December 2019. The film, detailed interviews, and dance videos are available at the UW Library Archives.

In November 2019, Paul was featured in MOHAI Seattle's exhibit "Beyond Bollywood - Indian Americans who have shaped the nation," an ongoing exhibit until January 2020.

In 2019, Paul founded the Socially Conscious Artists Foundation (SCARF) whose mission is to create and foster art that brings awareness around social issues to galvanize change. Her recent January 2020 partnership with the Museum of History and Industry (MOHAI) for a conference entitled "A celebration of South Asian Resilience" featured an excerpt of her upcoming production mUrChati, and was called "BuddhiBhrama-- a mind disturbed." The work featured local artists and students of Arpan Performing Arts.

Paul has served or is currently serving on the executive boards for the following organizations: YMCA, YWCA, Abhivyakti KaryaShala, Ragamala, Kirkland Performance Center, Seattle World Percussion Society, and SCARF.

== Arangetrams and Choreographies ==
- BuddhiBhrama (2020)
- Arangetram of Shishya Stepanka (2019)
- Arangetram of Shishya Akshata (2018)
- Arangetram of Shishya Devanshi (2017)
- Arangetram of Shishya Savitha (2016)
- Yavanika: Veiled Perspectives (2014) previewed at Kirkland Performance Center, WA
- Arangetram of Shishya Nivedita (2013)
- Arangetram of Shishya Meera (2011)
- Arangetram of Shishya Veena (2010)
- LayaSamvaad (2009) opened at Ehsaas 2009
- Kalaprayanam (2007) at Ehsaas 2007
- Kalaprayanam (2005) previewed at Northwest FolkLife Festival, Seattle, WA
- Tillana in ragam Maand first performed at Town Hall (March 2003) for Dance to the Music series.
- Kaikottikali, Himachali folk dances, Dandiya, Garbha and other folk dances of India.
