= Infinite Love =

Single by A. R. Rahman
- Released: 20 December 2012
- Recorded: 2012
- Genre: Pop, rap
- Length: 7:36
- Label: Sony Music
- Songwriters: English: A. R. Rahman, Blaaze, Gil Levy; Hindi: Irshad Kamil, A. R. Rahman, Blaaze, Gil Levy
- Producer: Kareema Begum

A. R. Rahman singles chronology
"'Nimma Nimma'" (2012)	"Infinite Love" (2012)	"'Rasaayana Rojakkal'" (2013)

"Infinite Love" is a single by Indian composer A. R. Rahman. The single was released under Sony Music on 20 December 2012 and was recorded to "instill faith and optimism in people" prior to the predicted doomsday on 21 December 2012. The song was also released in Hindi, titled "Behad Pyaar", which translates to "Infinite Love" in English. Rahman, Indian rapper Blaaze along with Gil Levy wrote the lyrics for the English version, whereas lyricist Irshad Kamil worked on the Hindi lyrics.

== Development ==
Initially, several reports in September 2012 came up that Rahman's son A. R. Ameen would feature in his maiden production venture which would be a film. Though Rahman confirmed the reports not to be a film but claimed kids to be a part of this project and so his son. In December 2012, Rahman announced that he has finished composing a song to "instill faith and optimism in people" facing a prediction that the world would come to an end on 21 December 2012. After his last non-film work of patriotic album Vande Mataram released in 1997, post 15 years Rahman came up with this single. For this project, he collaborated with global industrialist Mukesh Ambani and his wife Nita Ambani's production Reliance Industries Ltd. Rahman stated that he personally interacted with his fans and tapped into their perspectives on topics such as creating a borderless world, understanding of karma and the importance of being human. Infinite Love had developed keeping a global audience in mind. The base concept of the song evolved when Rahman recollected a story about an elephant, wandering into a village of the blind people. Each person touches a different part of the elephant, the trunk, the tail, the tusk, and each one feels what the creature is. Rahman said in one of his interviews that he had started working on the concept two years back in 2010 but due to his busy schedule, he could pay attention to it only after a year. He also wanted to make project kid-friendly which would provide kids "exciting content to watch".

== Music video ==
A music video is directed by Paul Boyd who has worked with artists like Sting, Shania Twain, Kylie Minogue, Celine Dion, Bryan Adams and INXS. The video is choreographed by Longinus Fernandes, whose work in the 2012 Bollywood film Barfi! was lauded by critics. The video was shot in late-September 2012 at various locations including Mumbai, United States, Jamaica and Hong Kong. The video footage was shot across four different countries in 20 days over six months by Boyd, featuring children from Africa, Hong Kong, USA and India. A cloaked figure was also featured which would be indicated to bring healing to the world. Rahman wrote that the music video would serve "as a reminder" for everybody "to be open to change and the incredible ways we can come together in the world." Rahman's son A. R. Ameen who made his acting debut with "Infinite Love", had taken a three days acting course before the shooting commenced. The music video involved around 200 people and had CGI effects which were finished in three months. The shooting footage of 30 hours was then edited to seven minutes short film to highlighted the making of video.

== Release ==
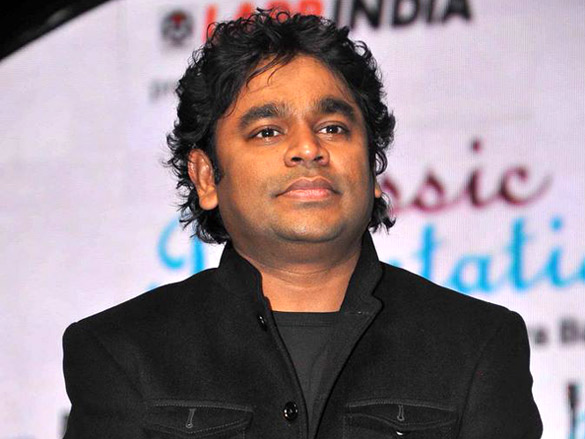
"I'm excited to share my new video for a new song I've written, named 'Infinite Love'. I wanted 'Infinite Love' to embody all the great facets of life and culture around the world, while celebrating the similarities and embracing the differences of each.

— A.R. Rahman on his single Infinite Love .

The song was unveiled on 20 December 2012 at the Dhirubhai Ambani International School, Mumbai. The song was officially released on the same day through YouTube and iTunes. According to Rahman, writing in the Huffington Post, he was "excited to share" his new single video which would celebrate "the similarities and differences" of "all the great facets of life and culture around the world". Rahman wanted the song released like an album as he was involved in multiple roles for his project. In addition to creating the concept for the project, Rahman also acted as a producer, and he described the whole project as a "learning process" for him.> He expressed to extend the concept to an extended play, "if not a complete album".
