= A. R. Ameen =

Indian playback singer

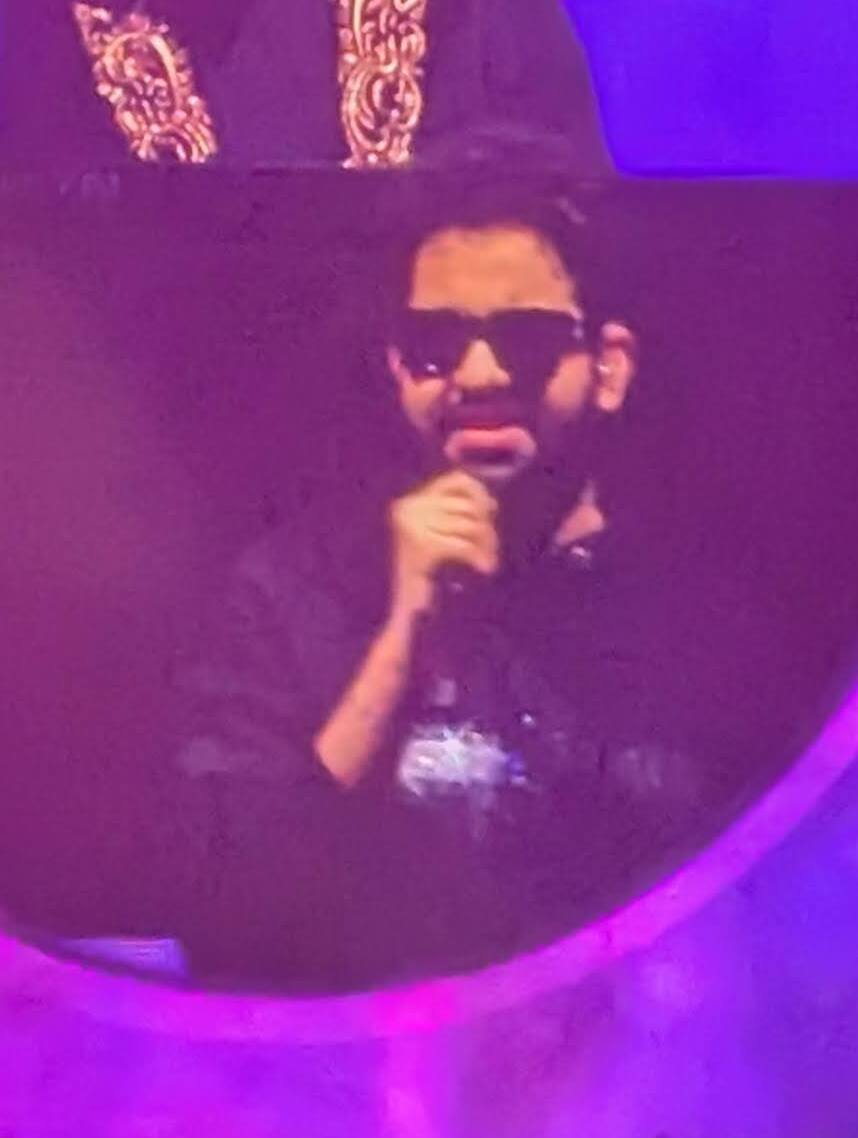

Background information
- Born: Chennai, Tamil Nadu, India
- Genres: Film score, classical
- Occupation: Singer
- Years active: 2009–present
- Education: Lady Andal
- Father: A. R. Rahman
- Relatives: Khatija Rahman (sister)
- Family: R. K. Shekhar family
- Musical career
- Genres: Filmi; pop
- Instrument: Vocals
- Label: KM Musiq

Allah Rakha Ameen is an Indian playback singer. He started his singing career in the film O Kadhal Kanmani, for which his father A. R. Rahman composed the music, and has since sung in several Indian languages. He also performs in live concerts across the globe with his father.

== Discography ==
Year	Songs	Film	Music director	Co-singer(s)	Language
2009	"NaNa"	Couples Retreat	A. R. Rahman	A. R. Rahman, Blaaze, Vivian Chaix, Clinton Cerejo & Dominique Cerejo	English
2015	"Maula Wa Sallim"	O Kadhal Kanmani	A. R. Rahman	Solo	Tamil
2015	"Maula Wa Sallim" (Telugu Dub)	O Kadhal Kanmani	A. R. Rahman	Solo	Telugu
2016	"Kotha Kotha Bhasha"	Nirmala Convent	Roshan	Solo	Telugu
2017	"Maula Wa Sallim"	Ok Jaanu	A. R. Rahman	Solo	Hindi
2017	"Mard Maratha"	Sachin: A Billion Dreams	A. R. Rahman	Anjali Gaikwad	Hindi
2017	"Mard Marathi" (Marathi Dub)	Sachin: A Billion Dreams	A. R. Rahman	Anjali Gaikwad	Marathi
2017	"Veer Marata" (Telugu Dub)	Sachin: A Billion Dreams	A. R. Rahman	Anjali Gaikwad	Telugu
2017	"Cricket Kara" (Tamil Dub)	Sachin: A Billion Dreams	A. R. Rahman	Anjali Gaikwad, Vishwa Prasad	Tamil
2018	"Pullinangal"	2.0	A. R. Rahman	Bamba Bakya, Suzanne D'Mello	Tamil
2018	"Nanhi Si Jaan"	2.0	A. R. Rahman	Kailash Kher, Suzanne D'Mello	Hindi
2018	"Bulliguvaa" (Telugu Dub)	2.0	A. R. Rahman	M. M. Keeravani, Suzanne D'Mello	Telugu
2020	"Never Say Goodbye"	Dil Bechara	A. R. Rahman	A. R. Rahman	English/Hindi
2021	"Tala Al Badru Alyana"	Single	Yuvan Shankar Raja		Tamil/Arabic
2021	"Sooravalli Ponnu" (Tamil Dub)	Atrangi Re	A. R. Rahman	Nakul Abhyankar, Varun Uday, Darshan Kt, Sharanya Srinivas	Tamil
2023	"Ninaivirukka"	Pathu Thala	A. R. Rahman	Shakthisree Gopalan	Tamil
2023	"Kya Yaad Tumhein" (Hindi Dub)	Pathu Thala	A. R. Rahman	Chinmayi	Hindi
2023	"Veerane"	Maamannan	A. R. Rahman	Solo	Tamil
2024	"Maanja Nee"	Ayalaan	A. R. Rahman	A. R. Rahman	Tamil
2025	"Vinveli Nayaga"	Thug Life	A. R. Rahman	Shruti Haasan	Tamil
2025	"My Heartu Spinning"	Idli Kadai	G. V. Prakash Kumar	Sublahshini	Tamil
2026	"Chikiri Chikiri"(Tamil Dub)	Peddi	A. R. Rahman	Solo	Tamil

== Music videos ==
Year	Title	Notes	
2012	"Infinite Love"	Special appearance	
2016	"Ginga"	Special appearance	
2019	"Jai Hind India"	Special appearance	
2026	Bheegi Bheegi	Single featuring Dulquer Salmaan, Mrunal Thakur	*Composer A.R. Rahman; *Co-singer Jasleen Royal

== Awards ==
Year	Award	Category	Film
2015	Mirchi Music Awards South	Upcoming Male Vocalist	O Kadhal Kanmani for "Maula Wa Sallim"
2015	Vikatan Awards 2015	Best Playback Singer (Male)	O Kadhal Kanmani for "Maula Wa Sallim"
2015	Behindwoods Gold Medals	Best Singer Male	O Kadhal Kanmani for "Maula Wa Sallim"
