= Leela Samson =

Indian choreographer (born 1951)

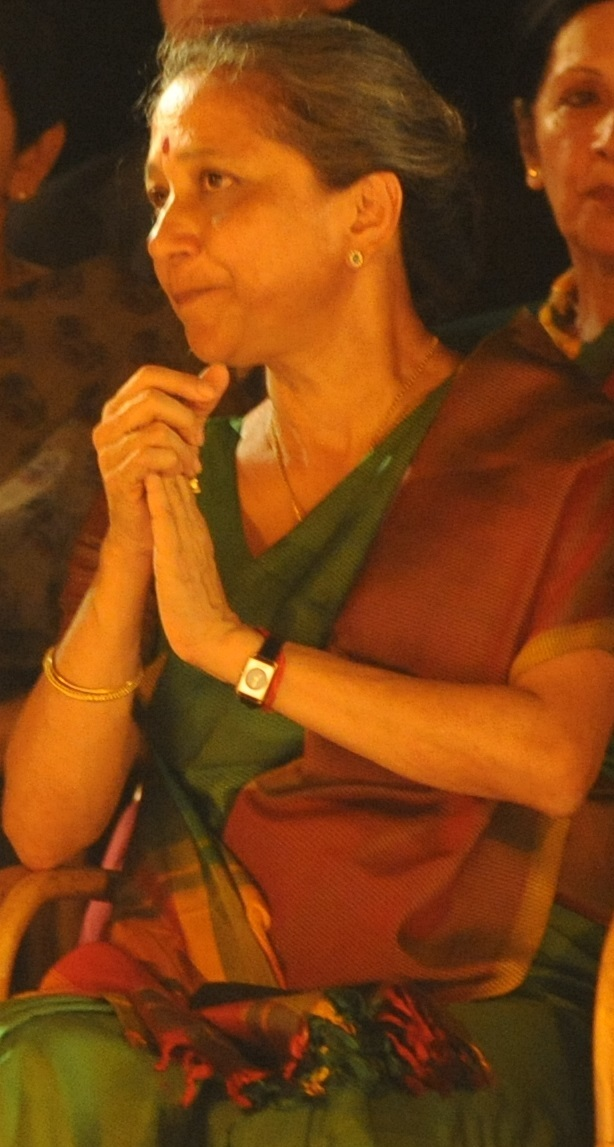
- Leela Samson
- Born: 6 May 1951 (age 75); Coonoor, The Nilgiris District, Madras State (now Tamil Nadu), India
- Occupations: Chairperson: Central Board of Film Certification (2011–15); Director: Kalakshetra (2005–13); Chairperson: Sangeet Natak Akademi (2010–14); Actor: OK Kanmani (2015), Adithya Varma (2019), Sillu Karupatti (2019)
- Father: Benjamin Abraham Samson
- Awards: Padma Shri; Sangeet Natak Akademi Award; Kalaimamani (2005)
- Dancing career
- Current group: Spanda (1995–present)
- Dances: Bharatanatyam
- Website: www.leelasamsondance.com

Leela Samson (born 6 May 1951) is a Bharatanatyam dancer, choreographer, instructor, writer and actress from India. As a soloist, she is known for her technical virtuosity and has taught Bharatanatyam at Shriram Bhartiya Kala Kendra in Delhi for many years.

She was appointed as the director of Kalakshetra by the Congress-led United Progressive Alliance in April 2005. She was subsequently also appointed as the chairperson of the Sangeet Natak Akademi in August 2010 and as the chairperson of the Central Board of Film Certification (CBFC) in April 2011.

She resigned from her position as director of Kalakshetra in 2012. She resigned from her position as chairperson of the CBFC after the Film Certification Appellate Tribunal overturned her attempt to ban the film MSG: The Messenger of God featuring Dera Sacha Sauda founder Gurmeet Ram Rahim Singh in a lead role and gave it clearance.

She made her film acting debut in 2015 through the Tamil film, OK Kanmani directed by Mani Ratnam. She reprised her role in the film's Hindi remake, OK Jaanu (2017). She also appeared in Adithya Varma (2019) and Putham Pudhu Kaalai (2020).

== Early life and training ==
Samson was born on 6 May 1951 in Coonoor, Tamil Nadu, to Vice Admiral Benjamin Abraham Samson and Laila Samson. Her father belonged to the Jewish Bene-Israelite community from Pune, and her mother belonged to the Gujarati Roman Catholic community from Ahmedabad. Leela's paternal aunt Annie was the Principal of Anjum-e-Islam Muslim school for girls in Mumbai for 31 years.

When Samson was nine years of age, her father sent her to Kalakshetra to learn Indian classical dance and music under its founder, Rukmini Devi Arundale and she studied at the Besant Theosophical High School at the same time. She completed her B.A. at Sophia College for Women and this is where she was inspired to make her career in Bharatnatyam. After completing her B.A., Samson continued to learn Bharatanatyam at Kalakshetra.

== Career ==
Starting her career as a Bharatanatyam soloist, Samson taught at Shriram Bharatiya Kala Kendra, Delhi, and Gandharva Mahavidyalaya, Delhi. Over the years, she started performing across India and abroad including Europe, Africa and the Americas.

In 1995, Samson formed Spanda, a dance group to review the traditional vocabulary of Bharatanatyam. Two documentary films – Sanchari and The Flowering Tree – have been made on her works. Her notable disciples included Joyce Paul Poursabahian and Justin McCarthy, who now teaches at Sri Ram Bhartiya Kala Kendra. She has taught and mentored performers including the late Kamaljit Bhasin Maalik (Meeto), Jin Shan Shan (Eesha), Navtej Singh Johar and Anusha Subramanyam.

She authored a biography of Rukmini Devi Arundale. She has taught Bharatanatyam across the world, including at the Royal Opera House, Covent Garden, London, and the annual Milapfest in Manchester.

== Awards ==
Samson received the Padma Shri (1990), the Sanskriti award, the Nritya Choodamani, Kalaimamani (2005) given by Government of Tamil Nadu, and the Sangeet Natak Akademi Award (1999–2000) for contributions to Bharatanatyam.

She was also nominated for the Filmfare Award for Best Supporting Actress-Tamil at the 63rd Filmfare Awards South.

== Controversy ==
Samson is known for her proximity to the Nehru-Gandhi of the Indian National Congress, as she was the dance tutor of Priyanka Vadra. Samson held six key positions in the 10 years of Congress-led United Progressive Alliance regime. Many papers including the Indian Express alleged favouritism regarding her appointment as the chairperson of the censor board by UPA govt in 2011:

Leela Samson's appointment as chairperson of the Censor Board has raised the question as to whether the well-known Bharatanatyam dancer will have time to devote to her new assignment. Last year, Samson was appointed chairperson of the Sangeet Natak Akademi, another prestigious position. The academy is the apex body for the performing arts. Samson is also ex-officio head of the south zone cultural centre. Apart from these commitments, she has a full-time job as director of Kalakshetra in Chennai. Samson, who was once Priyanka Gandhi's dance teacher, has no particular connection with the world of cinema. After her appointment, Samson candidly admitted that she seldom watches films.

Samson's tenures at Kalakshetra, Sangeet Natak Akademi and the censor board were mired with many controversies amid allegations of corruption, illegal appointments and arbitrary awarding of contracts, as well as financial irregularities.

Samson was criticised by the Vishwa Hindu Parishad when she passed the 2014 Aamir Khan-starrer movie PK without any cuts, even after two board members resigned after it was granted certification, due to content allegedly designed to ridicule Hindu religious philosophy and hurt Hindu sentiments. Veteran Bollywood actor and a former chairperson of the censor board Anupam Kher criticised Samson for playing politics by making partisan allegations while tendering her resignation. This criticism was made highlighting the history of CBFC under her leadership which agreed to make cuts in Entertainment after protests by Muslim groups and also agreed to make cuts in Kamaal Dhamaal Malamaal after protests by Christian groups, personally assuring them that "necessary action had been taken".

In December 2019, Central Bureau of Investigation filed a case of corruption and criminal breach of trust against Samson and three other Kalakshetra colleagues for financial irregularities.

On 23 December 2022, as a comment on a facebook post, Leela had accused a male faculty of Kakakshetra of molesting young girls of the institute. She alleged that the male faculty was in inappropriate relationsship with an intern, Athena Sadiq. The faculty as well as Athena denied the allegations and filed a criminal defamation case against Leela. The case was settled in June 2025 after a mediation. As per terms of settlement, the XVI additional civil court ordered Leela to pay her Rs. 8 lakh to Athena and publish a regret post on Fecebook. Leela posted on Facebook,

On December 23, 2022, I put a post on Athena, former student and presently Tutor at the Kalakshetra Foundation, on Facebook. I had wrongly mentioned her name in connection with a male faculty. I regret the error and no further comments will be made by me on her in the future.

It is also alleged that before making the regret post on the Facebook, Leela reduced the visibility of her post by reducing her 2000 facebook friends of her account to just 5 friends.

== Works ==
- Samson, Leela (1987). Rhythm in Joy: Classical Indian Dance Traditions. New Delhi: Lustre Press.
- Samson, Leela (2010). Rukmini Devi: A Life, Delhi: Penguin Books, India, ISBN 0-670-08264-3.

== Filmography ==
Year	Film	Role	Language	Notes
2015	O Kadhal Kanmani	Bhavani	Tamil	Debut Tamil film
2017	OK Jaanu	Charu Srivastava	Hindi	Debut Hindi film
2018	America Mappillai	Vasantha	Tamil	TV series
2019	Adithya Varma	Adithya's grandmother	Tamil	
2019	Sillu Karupatti	Yashoda	Tamil	Anthology film; Segment: Turtles
2020	Putham Pudhu Kaalai	Bhairavi	Tamil	Amazon Prime anthology film; Segment: Reunion
2020	Kaali Khuhi	Dadi	Hindi	Netflix Original
2021	Bhramam	Irene Dicotta	Malayalam	Debut Malayalam film
2021	Shyam Singha Roy	Psychologist	Telugu	Debut Telugu film
2022	Priyan Ottathilanu	Priscilla's mother	Malayalam	
2023	Music School	Devika Reddy	Hindi; Telugu	
2023	Vaan Moondru	Chitra	Tamil	
2023	Leo	Public Prosecutor	Tamil	
2024	Jananam 1947 Pranayam Thudarunnu	Gowri	Malayalam	
2024	Jai Ganesh	Uma Moorthi	Malayalam	
2024	Andhagan	D'Susa	Tamil	
2024	Bhale Unnade	Revathi	Telugu	
2025	Red Flower		Tamil	
2025	Yellow	Kalyani	Tamil	
2026	Legally Veer		Telugu	

== Awards and nominations ==
Year	Award	Category	Film	Result	Ref.
2015	Filmfare Awards South	Best Supporting Actress – Tamil	O Kadhal Kanmani	Nominated	
2015	Norway Tamil Film Festival Awards	Best Supporting Actress	O Kadhal Kanmani	Won	-
