= Ok Jaanu =

2017 Indian film by Shaad Ali

- Theatrical release poster
- Directed by: Shaad Ali
- Written by: Mani Ratnam; Gulzar (dialogues)
- Story by: Mani Ratnam
- Based on: O Kadhal Kanmani (Tamil) by Mani Ratnam
- Produced by: Mani Ratnam; Karan Johar; Apoorva Mehta; Hiroo Yash Johar
- Starring: Aditya Roy Kapur; Shraddha Kapoor; Naseeruddin Shah; Leela Samson; Prahlad Kakkar
- Cinematography: Ravi K. Chandran
- Edited by: A. Sreekar Prasad
- Music by: A. R. Rahman
- Production companies: Madras Talkies; Dharma Productions
- Distributed by: Fox Star Studios
- Release date: 13 January 2017
- Running time: 137 minutes
- Country: India
- Language: Hindi
- Budget: ₹27 crore
- Box office: ₹39.23 crore

OK Jaanu (transl. OK darling) is a 2017 Indian Hindi-language musical romantic drama film directed by Shaad Ali, written by Mani Ratnam and produced by Ratnam and Karan Johar under their banners Madras Talkies and Dharma Productions respectively. A remake of Ratnam's Tamil film O Kadhal Kanmani, it stars Aditya Roy Kapur and Shraddha Kapoor with a supporting cast including Naseeruddin Shah and Leela Samson, the latter of whom appeared in the original as well, marking her Hindi debut, who essay the role of the protagonists' landlords. A. R. Rahman composed the film's score and soundtrack, with Gulzar writing the lyrics and dialogues. The film was released on 13 January 2017 to mixed reviews with criticism of the story, screenplay, direction, and dialogues, although the chemistry of the lead pair, music (with the exception of one song), cinematography, and the supporting cast performances were praised.

== Plot ==
Aditya "Adi" Gunjal comes to Mumbai to work for a gaming company owned by his boss, aspiring to make it big in the United States as a video game developer. At Mumbai railway station, he spots a girl on the adjacent platform trying to jump in front of an approaching train. A horrified Adi shouts at her. The girl then disappears.

Adi moves into the house of Gopi Shrivastava, his elder lawyer brother Ravi's senior, a strict, retired High Court judge living with his wife Charu, a renowned Hindustani classical singer who suffers from stage-two Alzheimer's disease. On his first day at work, Adi is encouraged by his friend Bantee to pitch the idea of his game "Mumbai 2.0" to his boss. Adi impresses his boss and gets a deadline of five months to prepare a prototype for a competition in Los Angeles.

Later, while at his friend Jenny's wedding, Adi spots the girl from the station. The girl introduces herself as Tara Agnihotri. Adi learns that Tara is planning to pursue architectural studies in Paris, and he says that he dreams of becoming a big shot like Mark Zuckerberg. Adi and Tara strike a chord over their mutual belief that the institution of marriage is dysfunctional. Tara also reveals that her antics at the railway station were a ploy to get rid of her ex-boyfriend, who desired to marry her. Subsequently, they hang out and explore the city together. The next day, Adi pursues Tara to Ahmedabad on her work trip. Tara takes Adi to Sabarmati Ashram, which she used to visit with her father as a child. She discloses that her decision never to marry was influenced by her parents' failed marriage. Adi and Tara decide to live with each other before they go their separate ways for their respective careers. The two approach Gopi and Charu with their wish. Gopi initially strongly disagrees with their desire but then decides to give in when Tara impresses Charu with her classical singing.

Adi's family plans to give Adi a surprise visit, and his sister-in-law finds out that he is living with Tara, which his brother would adamantly oppose. She asks Tara to ponder their future as she may have to choose between her love and her career. Tara and Adi continue living happily, getting a thrill out of growing camaraderie and growing affinity and attachment.

Tara's admission to the institute in Paris gets approved. Tara informs Gopi of this and confides in him that it might now be hard for her to leave Adi and go so far away. The next day, Tara goes to Jaipur for a work trip, and Adi starts to miss her profoundly. Adi gets summoned to Kanpur by Tara's affluent mother, who wishes to know her daughter's intentions. As a result, Tara finds Adi missing when she returns from Jaipur and searches for him miserably, realizing that living without him would make her sad.

Tara and Adi begin to understand the importance of each other's presence in their lives, especially after seeing the love and patience Gopi has for his ailing wife. One day, she goes missing as she bewilderingly forgets the way to her own house and is found by Tara and Adi sitting on a temple platform in heavy rain.

Tara's mother visits Adi's family to discuss marriage, infuriating Tara. Later in the day, Adi's game, "Mumbai 2.0," gets selected for the competition in Los Angeles, meaning that he has to leave for the United States soon. He confides in Jenny that it'd be hard for him to go. Tara, too, seems visibly upset. The next day, Adi and Tara make a pact to enjoy themselves to the fullest for the next ten days, after which they will go their separate ways.

One day, Charu goes missing again. While looking for her, they start bickering about their relationship. However, after finding Charu and bringing her home to her husband, Adi finally proposes marriage to Tara before leaving for their respective destinations. They get married in Gopi's house among close friends and family.

Post-marriage, both continue to accomplish their dreams, one in Paris and the other in Los Angeles, keeping in touch and waiting for the day to be together again.

An end credits roll plays the rest of their story in animation, with them finally living together one day and starting a family.

== Cast ==
- Aditya Roy Kapoor as Aditya "Adi" Gunjal
- Shraddha Kapoor as Tara Gunjal (nee Agnihotri) (Few lines as Mona Ghosh Shetty).
- Naseeruddin Shah as Gopi Srivastava
- Leela Samson as Charu Srivastava
- Jasmeet Singh Bhatia as Bantu
- Eesh Kakkar as Romi, Tara's ex-boyfriend
- Kitu Gidwani as Tara's mother
- Sanjay Gurbaxani as Deputy Commissioner of Police
- Sarika Singh as Adi's sister-in-law
- Vibhoutee Sharma as Jennifer
- Vijayant Kohli as Ravi Gunjal, Adi's brother
- Prahlad Kakkar as Adi's boss
- Boloram Das as a security guard
- Nas Daily as a wedding guest

== Soundtrack ==
Ok Jaanu

Soundtrack album by A. R. Rahman
- Released: 12 December 2016
- Genre: Feature film Soundtrack
- Length: 34:15
- Language: Hindi
- Label: Sony Music India
- Producer: A. R. Rahman

A. R. Rahman chronology
Mohenjo Daro (2016)	Ok Jaanu (2016)	Kaatru Veliyidai (2017)

The film score and soundtrack are composed by A. R. Rahman while the lyrics for songs are written by Gulzar. Rahman re-used most of his compositions from the Tamil soundtrack of O Kadhal Kanmani, with the exception of three songs. He composed two new songs for the film which are the Hindi counterparts of "Aye Sinamika" and "Malargal Kaetten" that were part of the Tamil version. The Hindi counterpart of "Parandhu Sella Vaa" is a cover version of Rahman's yesteryear classic "Humma Humma" from Ratnam's 1995 Tamil film Bombay. Dubbed as "The Humma Song", the cover was done by Badshah and Tanishk Bagchi. "The Humma Song was heavily criticized for its reliance on remixing already famous tracks for commercial appeal, highlighting a troubling trend as it prioritizes accessibility over musical creativity. This results in a lack of depth and originality, with software-generated beats and loops failing to compensate for the overall lack of artistic effort. The full soundtrack was released by Sony Music India on 4 January 2017.

OK Jaanu Track listing
No.	Title	Lyrics	Singer(s)	Length
1.	"OK Jaanu"	Gulzar	A. R. Rahman & Srinidhi Venkatesh	03:26
2.	"The Humma Song"	Original Lyrics: Mehboob; Rap Lyrics: Badshah	Jubin Nautiyal, Shashaa, Badshah; Tanishk Bagchi	02:59
3.	"Enna Sona"	Gulzar	Arijit Singh	03:33
4.	"Jee Lein"	Gulzar	Neeti Mohan, Arjun Chandy & Savithri R Prithvi	04:46
5.	"Kaara Fankaara"	Navneet Virk, Kaly, Hard Kaur & ADK	Kaly, Hard Kaur, ADK, Shashaa Tirupati, Ashima Mahajan, Paroma Das Gupta & Sameera Bharadwaj	05:44
6.	"Saajan Aayo Re"	Gulzar	Jonita Gandhi & Nakash Aziz	06:09
7.	"Maula Wa Sallim"	Traditional	A. R. Ameen	03:06
8.	"Sunn Bhavara"	Gulzar	Shashaa Tirupati	04:23
Total length:				34:15

== Box office ==
The film grossed an estimated ₹392.3 million (US$4.1 million) worldwide, with approximately ₹328.3 million (US$3.4 million) earned domestically, and ₹64 million (US$660,000) from international releases.Box Office India declared the film a flop.

== Reception ==
Bollywood Hungama rated the film 2.5 out of 5 stars, stating that it is "a decent love story which works only in parts mainly because of the chemistry between Aditya Roy Kapur and Shraddha Kapoor."

Writing for Hindustan Times, Anupama Chopra rated the film 2 out of 5, commenting, "This is just a pointless film, because an exact frame-for-frame version already exists in Tamil", referring to O Kadhal Kanmani, directed by Mani Ratnam. Chopra described Kapur and Kapoor as "too lightweight" to bring a comparable depth to the characters that the original actors did.

== Accolades ==
Award Ceremony	Category	Recipient	Result	Ref.(s)
10th Mirchi Music Awards	Raag-Inspired Song of the Year	"Sunn Bhavara"	Won	
10th Mirchi Music Awards	Raag-Inspired Song of the Year	"Saajan Aayo Re"	Nominated	
