= O Kadhal Kanmani =

2010 Indian film by Mani Ratnam

- Theatrical release poster
- Directed by: Mani Ratnam
- Written by: Mani Ratnam
- Produced by: Mani Ratnam
- Starring: Dulquer Salman; Nithya Menen
- Cinematography: P. C. Sreeram
- Edited by: A. Sreekar Prasad
- Music by: Songs: A. R. Rahman; Score: A. R. Rahman; Qutub-E-Kripa
- Production company: Madras Talkies
- Distributed by: Studio Green
- Release date: 17 April 2015
- Running time: 138 minutes
- Country: India
- Language: Tamil
- Budget: est. ₹6 crore
- Box office: est. ₹46.20crore

O Kadhal Kanmani (transl. Oh love, apple of my eye), also known as OK Kanmani, is a 2015 Indian Tamil-language romantic musical film written, directed and produced by Mani Ratnam. The film stars Dulquer Salmaan and Nithya Menen, portraying a young Tamil couple in a live-in relationship in Mumbai. Prakash Raj and Leela Samson play supporting roles as an older couple in the film, portraying the younger couple's landlords. The film was said to be a "reflection of the modern mindset of urban India", dealing with issues such as marriage and traditional values. The film featured music composed by A. R. Rahman, cinematography by P. C. Sreeram and editing by Sreekar Prasad. The title of this film is borrowed from the song 'Pottu Vaitha Kaadhal Thittam' from Kamal Haasan's 1992 film Singaaravelan.

Prior to the film's release, the soundtrack was well received and the promotional activity of the film on social media also garnered praise. O Kadhal Kanmani was released on 17 April 2015 and won positive reviews from critics, praising the lead pair's performances and the film's technical aspects. The film became a blockbuster at the box office, performing extremely well in Indian multiplexes and overseas. The film was later remade in Hindi as Ok Jaanu in 2017. O Kadhal Kanmani has gained a cult status over the years.

== Plot ==
Aditya Varadarajan is a progressive video game developer who relocates from Chennai to Mumbai to join a major tech firm. He secures accommodation as a paying guest at the residence of Ganapathy, a retired bank manager and an old colleague of Aditya's elder brother. Ganapathy lives with his wife, Bhavani, a former classical vocalist who is suffering from advanced Alzheimer's disease. At a colleague's wedding, Aditya encounters Tara Kalingarayar, an aspiring architect. They quickly realize they share a mutual skepticism toward the institution of marriage. Aditya subsequently learns that Tara is planning to pursue higher studies in Paris to escape her overbearing mother, who is constantly pressuring her to abandon her architectural ambitions to manage a traditional family business in Coimbatore.

The duo begin spending their leisure time together, eventually falling in love during a brief vacation. Tara discloses that her aversion to marriage stems from the severe psychological and emotional trauma she endured during her parents' bitter divorce. Bound by a mutual desire to avoid long-term legal commitment, they decide to enter a temporary live-in relationship before their respective global careers force a geographical separation. Although a traditional Ganapathy initially refuses to host an unmarried couple, Tara's warmth and respectful demeanor convince him to relent, allowing her to move into Aditya's room. The couple enjoys a blissful, uninhibited period of cohabitation, intentionally focusing on the present.

The impending reality of their careers begins to fracture their carefree dynamic. Tara admits to Ganapathy that her Parisian student visa is nearing approval, confessing her growing distress over leaving Aditya. When Tara travels to Jaipur on a brief architectural restoration project, Aditya experiences profound loneliness in her absence. Upon her return, she discovers that Aditya has been missing for two days, prompting a frantic search across the city with his colleagues. Aditya returns and reveals that Tara's elitist mother had tracking units locate him, pulling administrative strings to have the police briefly detain him in a lockup to intimidate him. Though the incident sparks a heated argument between Aditya and Tara, they quickly reconcile. Observing Ganapathy's absolute, patient devotion to the increasingly disoriented Bhavani, the young couple begins to subvert their own cynicism, silently recognizing the profound value of lifelong companionship.

Aditya's career advances when his game prototype is greenlit, securing him a lucrative promotion that requires a relocation to the United States. Recognizing that they only have ten days remaining before their paths diverge, Aditya and Tara agree to spend their final days together celebrating their bond. However, as the departure date nears, the emotional pressure manifests in frequent, unresolved arguments.

The turning point occurs when a disoriented Bhavani wanders out of the house alone in search of Ganapathy. As Aditya and Tara scour the streets of Mumbai to find her, their repressed anxieties boil over into a fierce confrontation regarding their impending separation. During the argument, Aditya breaks their original pact, confessing that his love for her outweighs his career ambitions and demanding that they marry. After successfully locating Bhavani and returning her to a relieved Ganapathy, Tara accepts Aditya's formal proposal. The couple marries in a modest civil ceremony surrounded by friends and family. Following the wedding, they honor their professional commitments; Tara departs for Paris while Aditya relocates to the United States. During the post-credits sequence, it is revealed that Aditya successfully concludes his American venture and relocates permanently to Paris, where the couple happily reunites and raises two children.

== Cast ==
- Dulquer Salmaan as Aditya 'Adi' Varadarajan
- Nithya Menen as Tara Kalingarayar
- Prakash Raj as Ganapathy Iyer
- Leela Samson as Bhavani Ganapathy
- Vinodhini Vaidyanathan as Saroja
- Ramya S. as Ananya
- Prabhu Lakshman as Buddy
- Siva Ananth as Vasudevan Varadarajan
- Rama Ramasamy as Chandrika
- John Devasahayam as John
- Kanika as a woman at the clinic (cameo appearance)
- B. V. Doshi as himself (cameo appearance)
- Ciby Bhuvana Chandran as Aditya's co-worker (uncredited)
- Ashwin Kumar Lakshmikanthan as Aditya's co-worker (uncredited)
- Pavithra Lakshmi as Aditya's co-worker (uncredited)
- Arav as Aditya's co-worker (uncredited)

== Production ==
=== Development ===
In early 2014, Mani Ratnam first approached Telugu actor Ram Charan to be a part of the film, but he felt the lead role would not work for him. In August 2014, Madras Talkies had confirmed that Dulquer Salmaan would play the lead role in their forthcoming production and it was reported that Mani Ratnam's regular collaborator, composer A. R. Rahman would also work on the film. Vairamuthu renewed his collaboration with Mani Ratnam and A. R. Rahman to write song lyrics, and stated that the director had told him the film's plot concisely within three minutes and described it as a "beautiful love story" about "two characters and their love and mindset". P. C. Sreeram joined the team later in the month, collaborating with the director after Alaipayuthey (2000). During the making of the film, the cinematographer hinted that the film has contents on the lines of Ratnam's Alaipayuthey (2000), and that it was also loosely based on a real life incident. In October 2014, the film was revealed to have a working title of OK Kanmani.

Mani Ratnam revealed that he had the fascination for making a film on the gaming culture before Kadal, and set the story in Mumbai as it was India's gaming hub and a place where a live-in relationship can happen more naturally than in South India. He revealed it was an urban love story, and added that the Mumbai setting was also justified as it dealt with people away from home who become independent of the rules and regulations of a family. The film was earlier wrongly reported to be bilingual in both Tamil and Malayalam; it was made only in Tamil.

In a press conference at Taj Coromandel in Chennai, Ratnam said that the film is a contemporary take on the new generation, their attitudes and their values. Through the film, Ratnam wanted to portray the change that takes place every five or six years when a new generation comes in with a different set of values.

=== Casting ===
The female lead role was initially offered to Alia Bhatt, who opted out citing her lack of ability to speak in Tamil, while Pooja Hegde also refused the offer, citing her commitment to Ashutosh Gowariker's Mohenjodaro (2016), which prevented her from working on other films. Parvathy Thiruvothu was also considered, before Nithya Menen was selected. Dulquer and Nithya worked together on O Kadhal Kanmani alongside their commitments in Jenuse Mohamed's Malayalam film 100 Days of Love, which eventually released a month before Mani Ratnam's film. The director revealed he first met Dulquer at the audio release function of Vaayai Moodi Pesavum (2014) and felt that he was the right choice to play the character Aadi, although he hadn't seen any of the actor's films. Ratnam had only previously seen Nithya Menen's 180 (2011) and Urumi (2011), where she had played small roles but was impressed. Ratnam was quoted saying, "I found something alive about her, something real and perfectly beautiful about her. Nithya carries an individuality and is not just a glamorous girl. Like her character in the film, Tara, she has a mind of her own."

Prakash Raj accepted to play a role in the film in September 2014 and expressed his excitement at being offered a unique character. Leela Samson, a Bharathanatyam dancer and author, was selected to make her acting debut and portray a retired Carnatic singer in the film, appearing as Prakash Raj's wife. Television anchor Ramya Subramanian was also picked to play Dulquer's friend in the film, and it became her first full-fledged acting role. The rest of the cast consisted of Mani Ratnam's assistant directors Sivakumar Ananth and Chandrika Chandran, while his friends Rama Ramasamy, Prabhu Lakshman and the former manager of Sify, John Devasahayam, were given other roles. Actress Kanika shot for a day in Chennai, to portray a small role in the film as did architect B. V. Doshi. A number of rookie actors, who later went onto feature in larger projects, including Arav, Ashwin Kumar Lakshmikanthan, Ciby Bhuvana Chandran and Pavithra Lakshmi made appearances as colleagues of Dulquer's character.

=== Filming ===
Principal photography began from 6 October 2014 with scenes featuring Dulquer Salmaan and Nithya Menen being filmed. Menen revealed that the film would be shot in a short span of time and her portions would be completed by December 2014, while the team swiftly shot scenes at locations in and around Chennai, including near a bank in Parry's Corner. The last leg of filming, started in Mumbai in November 2014 with the shooting lasting for a week. The team shot scenes at Indian Institute of Management Ahmedabad and CEPT University during December 2014, with renowned Indian architect B. V. Doshi filming for a guest appearance as Nithya's mentor. The team subsequently moved back to film further outdoor sequences in Mumbai, later that month. Following the schedule, P. C. Sreeram revealed that the film was practically complete and that the film would aim to release in early 2015.

The game animations for the film were handled by Studio Dreamcatcher, who worked on two versions of a fictional game called Mumbai 2.0, which Dulquer's character develops in the film. A 2D prototype and a 3D 2.0 version were created for the film, while the team also took care of the animation sequences for the end credit segments. The company also took care of character designs, story board and animatics of the lead characters Dulquer, Nithya and John for the 3D sequences. The 2D animated opening title sequence for the film was handled by Mumbai-based animation studio Plexus. The film's title was changed in February 2015 from OK Kanmani to O Kadhal Kanmani in an attempt to gain an entertainment tax exemption in Tamil Nadu, through the use of a pure Tamil title.

== Music ==
The soundtrack and film score were composed by A. R. Rahman. The lyrics were written by Vairamuthu whereas Sirivennela Sitaramasastri wrote the Telugu lyrics for the dubbed version. The soundtrack album was noted to be "youthful" with Carnatic themes. Since Leela Samson plays the role of an old Carnatic singer in the film, there is a tinge of Carnatic music in the film. Ratnam wanted an original soundtrack from Rahman that is contemporary as well as trendy. Rahman's son, A. R. Ameen sang the track "Maula Wa Sallim" in Arabic. A first preview of the song "Mental Manadhil (Male version)" was released on 13 March 2015, while the full song was released as a single on 15 March 2015. The soundtrack album was released by Sony Music India on the midnight of 3 April 2015.

== Release ==
Social media promotions were handled by Chennai-based group, Uptown Ideas, and the film's presence on Facebook and Twitter succeeded in garnering praise and creating anticipation before release. The team had initially been assigned by Mani Ratnam to handle radio promotions, but consequently also managed online marketing and liaised with the director, sending him ideas of potential campaigns for approval. The team established a concept titled OKK Love Stories, with couples from all walks of life encouraged to share their love stories of how they met, keeping with the theme of the film. The first poster of the Tamil and the dubbed Telugu version of the film were released on 14 February 2015. The theatrical trailer was released subsequently released on 1 March 2015.

On 8 April 2015, the film was awarded a U/A certificate by the Central Board of Film Certification because of some "adult content" in the film. The makers then sent the film to the revising committee to acquire a "U" (Universal) certificate, but the status remained unchanged. A dubbed Telugu version was also developed to be released simultaneously titled OK Bangaram, with actor Nani selected to providing dubbing for Dulquer's character.

The film was distributed by Studio Green in 350 theatres in Tamil Nadu whereas producer Dil Raju's Sri Venkateswara Creations distributed the Telugu version. O Kadhal Kanmani was released worldwide on 17 April 2015.

The film premiered on Amazon Prime Video in Tamil language

== Reception ==
=== Critical reception ===
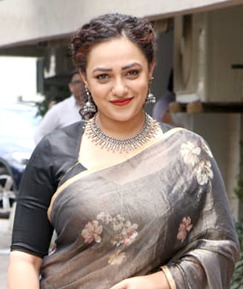
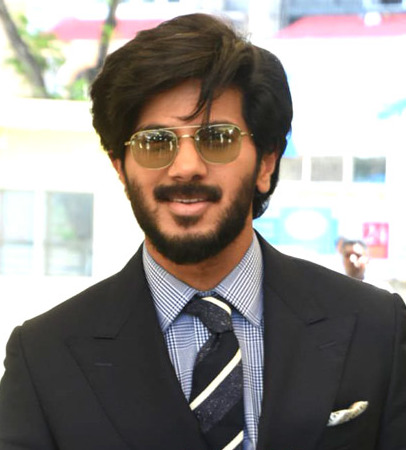
The film brought critical and commercial recognition to Nithya Menen and Dulquer Salmaan.

O Kadhal Kanmani received positive reviews from critics upon release, with International Business Times India calling it "the director's best in recent years" in their initial review round-up. Baradwaj Rangan of The Hindu wrote, "O Kadhal Kanmani is something of a greatest-hits package of Mani Ratnam", while also singling out Nithya Menen's performance for praise. He added "we’re all going to have our favourite scenes with her" and "if Mani Ratnam keeps employing actors like her, he may not need to write those zingers anymore." Anupama Subramanian of Deccan Chronicle wrote, "After a couple of lackluster flicks, master story teller Mani Ratnam is back with a bang with a feel good complete romantic movie O Kadhal Kanmani. There are a few overall glitches, nevertheless, watch OKK for its fresh approach and feel-good entertainment it offers." She awarded the film 3 stars out of 5. Reviewing for Firstpost, Latha Srinivasan stated, "O Kadhal Kanmani celebrates romance, an emotion that is as old as creation itself (remember Adam and Eve?). Mani Ratnam is back, with a 21st century love story that will charm you." Udhav Naig of The Hindu said "Ratnam has made a film that will not only resonate with audiences across India but has also truly retained the Tamil flavor". Naig called it is as one of those films in which everything seems to have come together: music, acting, editing and the cinematography. The critical review board of Behindwoods gave the film 3.25 stars out of 5 stating, "Okay, moral of the story – One fine morning, Mani Ratnam got up and decided to make something special for all young people out there. He then makes OK Kanmani, and in style".

Critics based at Sify stated, "The premise is simple, the story is focused. Technically OK Kanmani is superior as both AR Rahman and PC Sreeram have given their career best work for Mani Ratnam as the master craftsman himself is in tremendous form. O Kadhal Kanmani is definitely above a notch compared to the mediocre cinema we have been subjected to lately." Sudhish Kamath wrote, "OK Kanmani is unfortunately that Uncle who makes you believe that marriage is the answer to your conflict of living in without any expectations from each other." Haricharan Pudipeddi for Hindustan Times said that the film is a refreshing take on romance and relationship. This is his best work in years and this magical spell won't be forgotten easily. By throwing the spotlight on modern India's idea of romance, Ratnam has also succeeded in making us root for an older couple madly in love in O Kadhal Kanmani." Karthik Keramalu of IBN Live stated that the film is a love letter to the audience. He went on to call the film as, 'Mani Ratnam's timely reflection of our society' which mustn't be missed. He rated the film 5 out of 5. R. S. Prakash of Bangalore Mirror wrote, "Mani delves into the plot of live-in relationship, but he has chosen not to go overboard, given the sensitivity of the subject, especially in his part of the world. The screenplay, though a bit implausible at places, flows steadily, carrying the touches of the master filmmaker." Writing for The Times of India M. Suganth said, "The filmmaker shows that his touch is intact and he can still make a romance come alive on screen." The film was rated 3.5 out of 5 by him. Indo-Asian News Service stated, "By throwing the spotlight on modern India’s idea of romance, Ratnam has also succeeded in making us root for an older couple madly in love in “O Kadhal Kanmani”." S. Saraswathi of Rediff.com gave the film 3.5 out of 5 stars claiming that it has, "director's trademark, unique narrative style, realistic characters, and excellent performances coupled with great music and stunning visuals".

=== Box office ===
Madras Talkies made the film at a cost of ₹6 crores and upon release, it immediately became a profitable venture for producers and distributors, amassing ₹14.73 crore from its Tamil and Telugu dubbed version worldwide, within four days of release. In Tamil Nadu, O Kadhal Kanmani grossed nearly ₹6.30 cr in its first three days, opening at second place behind Kanchana 2 and experienced particular success in multiplexes as expected.

O Kadhal Kanmani also did "exceptional business" overseas, with theatrical rights sold worldwide for ₹2 crore. The venture managed to gross approximately $714, 000 (₹4.42 crore) from the US market alone, becoming one of the most successful Tamil films of all time in the US, as its acquisition price was very low compared to its business. During the opening weekend, the Tamil version of the film grossed ₹2.76 crs in the USA while the Telugu version grossed a further ₹1.40 crs. Likewise on the opening weekend in Australia, it grossed ₹50.82 lakhs and in the UK, the film has grossed ₹46.62 lakhs. Trade pundits remarked that the film was a "trade favourite" in the overseas market and predicted massive profits for the producers. Ten extra screen were added for the second week of the film in the US, and within a week, it became the second highest-grossing Tamil film of 2015, behind I. The film subsequently completed its run in the US, finishing at number seven on the all-time list. Similarly in the UK, the film completed a month-long run at the box office, unheralded for a film not featuring an established leading actor.

== Awards and nominations ==
Ceremony	Award	Category	Nominee	Outcome
3rd Behindwoods Gold Medal Awards	Behindwoods Gold Medal Awards	Best Actress	Nithya Menen	Nominated
3rd Behindwoods Gold Medal Awards	Behindwoods Gold Medal Awards	Best Male Playback Singer	A. R. Ameen for "Maula Wa Salim"	Won
3rd Behindwoods Gold Medal Awards	Behindwoods Gold Medal Awards	Best Choreographer	Brindha for "Parandhu Sella Vaa"	Nominated
3rd Behindwoods Gold Medal Awards	Behindwoods Gold Medal Awards	Best Cinematographer	P. C. Sriram	Won
3rd Behindwoods Gold Medal Awards	Behindwoods Gold Medal Awards	Best Director	Mani Ratnam	Nominated
3rd Behindwoods Gold Medal Awards	Behindwoods Gold Medal Awards	Best Distributor	Studio Green	Won
3rd Behindwoods Gold Medal Awards	Behindwoods Gold Medal Awards	Best Editor	A. Sreekar Prasad	Won
3rd Behindwoods Gold Medal Awards	Behindwoods Gold Medal Awards	Best Female Playback Singer	Shashaa Tirupati for "Parandhu Sella Vaa"	Nominated
3rd Behindwoods Gold Medal Awards	Behindwoods Gold Medal Awards	Best Lyricist	Vairamuthu for "Malargal Kaetten"	Nominated
3rd Behindwoods Gold Medal Awards	Behindwoods Gold Medal Awards	Best Music Director	A. R. Rahman	Nominated
3rd Behindwoods Gold Medal Awards	Behindwoods Gold Medal Awards	Best Supporting Actress	Leela Samson	Nominated
7th Edison Awards	Edison Awards	Best Actress	Nithya Menen	Nominated
7th Edison Awards	Edison Awards	Best Background Score	A. R. Rahman	Nominated
7th Edison Awards	Edison Awards	Best Editor	A. Sreekar Prasad	Nominated
7th Edison Awards	Edison Awards	Best Lyricist	Vairamuthu for "Malargal Kaetten"	Nominated
7th Edison Awards	Edison Awards	Best Music Director	A. R. Rahman	Nominated
7th Edison Awards	Edison Awards	Best Screenplay	Mani Ratnam	Nominated
7th Edison Awards	Edison Awards	Best Supporting Actor	Prakash Raj	Nominated
7th Edison Awards	Edison Awards	Best Supporting Actress	Leela Samson	Nominated
7th Edison Awards	Edison Awards	Iconic Spellbinder	Mani Ratnam	Nominated
63rd Filmfare Awards South	Filmfare Awards South	Best Actress	Nithya Menen	Nominated
63rd Filmfare Awards South	Filmfare Awards South	Best Director	Mani Ratnam	Nominated
63rd Filmfare Awards South	Filmfare Awards South	Best Film	Madras Talkies	Nominated
63rd Filmfare Awards South	Filmfare Awards South	Best Male Playback Singer	A. R. Rahman for "Mental Manadhil"	Nominated
63rd Filmfare Awards South	Filmfare Awards South	Best Music Director	A. R. Rahman	Nominated
63rd Filmfare Awards South	Filmfare Awards South	Best Supporting Actor	Prakash Raj	Nominated
63rd Filmfare Awards South	Filmfare Awards South	Best Supporting Actress	Leela Samson	Nominated
IBNLive Movie Awards 2016	IBNLive Movie Awards	Best Actor	Dulquer Salmaan	Nominated
1st IIFA Utsavam	IIFA Utsavam	Best Lyricist	P. C. Sriram	Nominated
1st IIFA Utsavam	IIFA Utsavam	Best Music Direction	A. R. Rahman	Nominated
1st IIFA Utsavam	IIFA Utsavam	Best Playback Singer – Female	Darshana KT & Shashaa Tirupati for "Kaara Aatakaara"	Nominated
1st IIFA Utsavam	IIFA Utsavam	Best Playback Singer – Male	A. R. Rahman for "Mental Manadhil"	Nominated
6th Norway Tamil Film Festival Awards	Norway Tamil Film Festival Awards	Best Cinematographer	P. C. Sriram	Won
6th Norway Tamil Film Festival Awards	Norway Tamil Film Festival Awards	Best Supporting Actress	Leela Samson	Won
5th South Indian International Movie Awards	South Indian International Movie Awards	Best Actor in a Supporting Role	Prakash Raj	Won
5th South Indian International Movie Awards	South Indian International Movie Awards	Best Actress (Critics)	Nithya Menen	Won
5th South Indian International Movie Awards	South Indian International Movie Awards	Best Actress	Nithya Menen	Nominated
5th South Indian International Movie Awards	South Indian International Movie Awards	Best Actress in a Supporting Role	Leela Samson	Nominated
5th South Indian International Movie Awards	South Indian International Movie Awards	Best Director	Mani Ratnam	Nominated
5th South Indian International Movie Awards	South Indian International Movie Awards	Best Female Playback Singer	Shashaa Tirupati for "Parandhu Sella Vaa"	Nominated
5th South Indian International Movie Awards	South Indian International Movie Awards	Best Film	Madras Talkies	Nominated
5th South Indian International Movie Awards	South Indian International Movie Awards	Best Lyricist	Vairamuthu for "Malargal Kaetten"	Won
5th South Indian International Movie Awards	South Indian International Movie Awards	Best Male Playback Singer	Karthik for "Aye Sinamika"	Nominated
5th South Indian International Movie Awards	South Indian International Movie Awards	Best Music Director	A. R. Rahman	Nominated
Vikatan Awards	Vikatan Awards	Best Music Director	A. R. Rahman	Won
Vikatan Awards	Vikatan Awards	Best Lyricist	Vairamuthu for "Malargal Kaetaen"	Won
Vikatan Awards	Vikatan Awards	Best Male Playback Singer	A. R. Ameen for "Maula Wa Salim"	Won
Vikatan Awards	Vikatan Awards	Best Female Playback Singer	Shashaa Tirupati for "Parandhu Sella Vaa"	Won

== Home media ==
The film is available for streaming in Disney+Hotstar, Amazon Prime Video and Netflix.

== Remake ==
A Hindi remake of the film was officially announced in November 2015, with Aditya Roy Kapur and Shraddha Kapoor portraying the lead roles, and directed by Shaad Ali. Karan Johar announced in late 2015 that he would produce the project in association with Mani Ratnam. Titled OK Jaanu, the film began production in March 2016 and was released in January 2017.

== Legacy ==
O Kadhal Kanmani has gained a cult status over the years. It is noted for its fresh take on modern day love, strong characters and for portraying live-in relationship. Nithya Menen's character Tara is considered among the most memorable female characters of Tamil cinema. Rediff.com placed her in its "Top 5 Tamil Actresses" list of 2015. Her performance is regarded as one of the "100 Greatest Performances of the Decade" by Film Companion.

Praising the film, actor Amitabh Bachchan said: "Mani Ratnam's film is a sweet and endearing story of love among the young. Fresh and with a sense of the changing times, in keeping with the sensibilities of this generation, it shows compassion and example with great dexterity." Song titles from the film's soundtrack were later used as titles for Tamil films, with Parandhu Sella Vaa (2016) beginning production in December 2015 and a film titled Sinamika starting in May 2016. A Telugu film titled Mental Madhilo also began production in late 2016. In March 2020, the film's choreographer Brindha launched her first film as a director and titled the film as Hey Sinamika (2022) with Dulquer in the lead role.
