= Shashaa Tirupati =

Canadian singer (born 1989)

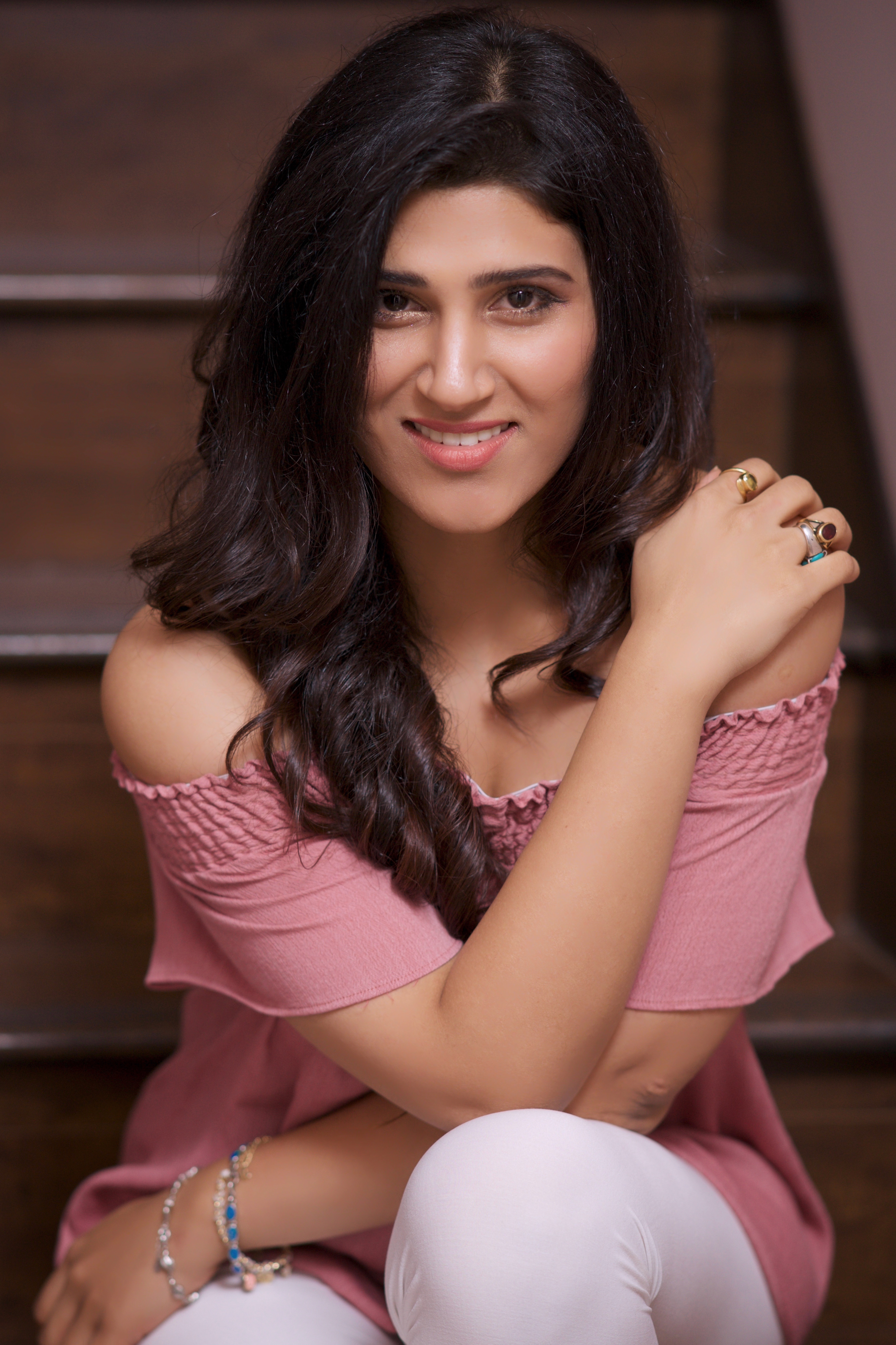
- Tirupati in March 2020
- Born: Shashaa Kiran Tirupati; 21 December 1989 (age 36); Srinagar, J&K, India
- Citizenship: Canada
- Occupations: Singer; Songwriter; Music producer; Composer
- Musical career
- Origin: Vancouver, Canada
- Genres: Classical; Western; pop; playback
- Instrument: Vocals
- Years active: 2010–present

Shashaa Kiran Tirupati (born 21 December 1989) is a Canadian singer, songwriter, and music producer known for her work in the Indian film and music industries. Popularly known as "The Humma Girl", in 2018, she won the National Film Award for Best Female Playback Singer, as well as the Filmfare Award for the Tamil song "Vaan Varuvaan" from Kaatru Veliyidai. Tirupati has recorded songs in over 20+ languages including: Hindi, Tamil, Telugu, Marathi, Punjabi, Malayalam, Kannada, Bengali, Konkani, Arabic, and English with more than 200 songs to her credit as a vocalist.

She is the voice behind Bollywood songs such as: "Khulke Jeene Ka" (Dil Bechara), "The Humma Song", from OK Jaanu; "Phir Bhi Tumko Chahunga" (with Arijit Singh) and "Baarish" for Half Girlfriend; "Kanha", for Shubh Mangal Savdhan; "O Sona Tere Liye" and "Chal Kahin Door", both from the film Mom. She features on the soundtrack of Mimi (2021) with the song titled 'Hututu', composed by AR Rahman and penned by Amitabh Bhattacharya.

Shashaa released her first single, 'In My Skin' from her debut Independent EP (I'm Sorry, Heart) featuring guitarist, Keba Jeremiah in January 2022.

== Early life ==
Shashaa Kiran Tirupati was born on 21 December 1989 in Srinagar, in the Kashmir Valley of the erstwhile Indian state of Jammu and Kashmir, into a Telugu family from Andhra Pradesh. Due to the rise of the Islamist insurgency in Kashmir, her family moved to Chandigarh, Allahabad, Delhi and finally settled in Vancouver, Canada.

Studying in both India and Canada during her childhood, she ultimately graduated in 2005 from L.A. Matheson Secondary School with a 96% average (repeating the twelfth grade she had already completed in India due to her being underage), and earned a Gordon M. Shrum Major Entrance Scholarship for Undergraduate Studies at Simon Fraser University, the Matheson Outstanding Academic Achievement Award, The Surrey Administrator's Scholarship, The UBC President's Entrance Scholarship, and the Governor General's Medallion for the top-most achiever of the province's graduating class of 2005.

She trained in Hindustani classical music as a vocalist in Allahabad under Kamala Bose and Girija Devi.

== Career ==
While pursuing her under-graduate studies, Shashaa continued to perform at festivals and solo concerts. She later left med school to pursue a career in Bollywood, playback singing in Mumbai. She plays kazoo (African instrument), western classical guitar, keyboards, and harmonium.

She participates in various Indian TV shows such as Sa Re Ga Ma Pa, Junoon and was noticed by A. R. Rahman during Coke Studio Season 3, shortly after which she sang a solo for him, "Vaada Vaada", in Kochadaiiyaan. Her second song, "Aye Mr. Minor", from Rahman's musical, Kaaviyathalaivan, gained immediate recognition in the Tamil music industry, followed by "Naane Varugiren", "Vaan", "Silikku Marame", "Oday Oday", "Kaara Aatakaara", "Un Kadhal Irundhaal", "Thaen Kaatru", "Uyiraagi", "Kaadhalaada" and the recent "Naan Pizhai" for Anirudh Ravichander.

She was featured on three tracks in the 2015 Mani Ratnam - A. R. Rahman film OK Kanmani: "Kaara Attaakaara", "Parandhu Sella Vaa", and "Naane Varugiren", as well as on the corresponding three songs in the Telugu version, OK Bangaram.

She has recently featured on the soundtrack of AR Rahman's "Dil Bechara", starring Sushant Singh Rajput and Sanjana Sanghi. The song, titled "Khulke Jeene Ka", features Tirupati and Arijit Singh. She has rendered two songs on the AR Rahman directorial "99 Songs" soundtrack, namely, "Soja Soja" (solo lead) and "Humnawaa" (with Armaan Mallik), which she has co-written as lyricist as well. Her recent Telugu song, "Manasu Maree", for actor Nani's film "V" with Amit Trivedi, also the composer of the film.

She toured extensively with A.R Rahman in: Encore Tour 2017, Infinite Love Tour, Rahmanishq Tour, T 20 Opening Concert, Greatest Hits Concert at the O2, Vadodara Festival, NH7 Weekender, TEDx Talks, and ENCORE 2017). She has sung more than 30 songs (in different languages) for him. Tirupati has performed at Men's Hockey World Cup Opening Ceremony as part of AR Rahman's Entourage. She was part of MTV Unplugged Season 4, alongside Hindi music director Mithoon. She is currently venturing into Independent Music, and releasing original content written and sung by herself. "String of Air" is her first independently released single.

Tirupati has rendered songs in over 13 languages, with more than 200 songs to her credit as a vocalist. She is also collaborating with playback singer, Chinmayi Sripada, for her fifth original composition, to be a bilingual track, titled "Yezhundhu Via" in Tamil and "Roothi Hui" in Hindi. The song was released Shashaa's YouTube Channel in January 2020. Shashaa made her theatre acting debut with the play I, Cloud, written and directed by Ulka Mayur, with lyricist Mayur Puri playing the male lead.

In 2025, she launched a new YouTube channel dedicated to devotional music, titled Divine Bhajan Mantra Aarti.

== Recognition ==
Shashaa, often referred to as "The Humma Girl", achieved numerous accolades in her career. In 2018, she received the National Film Award and Filmfare Award for Best Female Playback Singer for her rendition of the Tamil song "Vaan Varuvaan" from the movie Kaatru Veliyidai. She has won the Filmfare Award for "Vaan Varuvaan", She also won the Star Screen Award for Best Playback Singer (Female) for the song "Kanha" from Shubh Mangal Savdhan, and the Zee Cine Award 2018 for Viewer's Choice Song of the Year for "Baarish." Additionally, she was recognized with the Mirchi Music Award for "Sunn Bhanwara" from Ok Jaanu and received the Jubilee Awards 2017 Platinum and Gold Discs. Furthermore, she was honored with the Mirchi Music Award in 2015 for Best Upcoming Female Singer for the song "Aye Mr. Minor," composed by A. R. Rahman, and the Vikatan Award in 2015 for Best Upcoming Female Singer for "Naane Varugiren," also composed by A. R. Rahman.

== Independent music ==
Year	Song	Songwriter	Language	Collaborating Artist
2023	"Ik Raanjha"	Shashaa Tirupati	Punjabi	Shivam Mahadevan Sid Paul
2023	"Kiss me when I'm numb"	Shashaa Tirupati	English	Ft. Crehyl
2023	"Rang Jin Daaro"	Composer: Pt. Ramashray Jha, Music Production: Shashaa Tirupati	Hindi	Shashaa Tirupati
2022	"I'm Sorry Heart" (Title Track - I'M SORRY, HEART - EP)	Shashaa Tirupati	English	Ft. Keba Jeremiah
2022	"Pretend" (I'M SORRY, HEART - EP)	Shashaa Tirupati	English	Ft. Keba Jeremiah
2022	"In My Skin" (I'M SORRY, HEART - EP)	Shashaa Tirupati	English	Ft. Keba Jeremiah
2022	"Medieval Minds" (I'M SORRY, HEART - EP)	Shashaa Tirupati	English	Ft. Keba Jeremiah
2022	"Medieval Minds (Bonus)" (I'M SORRY, HEART - EP)	Shashaa Tirupati	English	Ft. Harry Nicholson
2020	"Siyaahii" Ft. Papon, Sid Paul"	Shashaa Tirupati	Hindi	Ft. Papon & Sid Paul
2020	"Leprechaun Love"	Shashaa Tirupati	English	Ft. Marc D Muse
2020	"Yezhundhu Vaa", "Roothi Hui"	Shashaa Tirupati	Tamil, Hindi	Chinmayi Sripada
2019	"Hum Kahaan Hain"	Shashaa Tirupati	Hindi	Production: Nishant Nagar
2019	"Beparwahi"	Shashaa Tirupati	Hindi	Hriday Gattani
2019	"Oceans Rained"	Shashaa Tirupati	English	Production: Saurabh Lokhande
2019	"String of Air"	Shashaa Tirupati	English	Self / Production: Siddhu Kumar, JC Joe

== Discography ==
Year	Album	Language	Song	Co-singer(s)	Music director
2010	Bumm Bumm Bole	Hindi	Rang De	Clinton Cerejo, Keerthi Sagathiya	Tapas Relia
2011	Turning 30	Hindi	My Kajra		Sidhharth Suhas
2011	Be Careful	Hindi	Love Technology	Solo	Sidhharth Suhas
2011	Be Careful	Hindi	Be My Mahiya	Solo	Sidhharth Suhas
2011	Tere Ishq Nachaya	Punjabi		Richa Sharma	Navraj Hans
2011	Tere Ishq Nachaya	Punjabi	Tenu Pyar Ho Gaya	Udit Narayan	Navraj Hans
2011	Jo Hum Chahein	Hindi	Abhi Abhi	KK	Sachin Gupta
2012	Yeh Stupid Pyar	Hindi	Mascara		Reeky Dev
2012	Ainwain Raula Pai Gaya	Punjabi	Jawani Mandi Nai		Ravinder Grewal
2013	Raja Rani	Tamil	Oday Oday	Vijay Prakash	G. V. Prakash Kumar
2013	Nimirnthu Nil	Tamil	Kadhal Nergaiyil	Javed Ali	G. V. Prakash Kumar
2013	Janda Pai Kapiraju	Telugu	Inthandanga	Javed Ali	G. V. Prakash Kumar
2013	Coke Studio - Season 3	Tamil; Urdu; Bengali; Hindi	Hindustani Choir: Naan yen piranden Zariya; Jagao Mera Des; Aao Balma; Soz-o-Salaam		A. R. Rahman
2014	Kochadaiiyaan – The Warrior (Dubbed version)	Hindi	Vaada Vaada (Female)		A. R. Rahman
2014	Kaaviya Thalaivan	Tamil	Aye Mr. Minor	Haricharan	A. R. Rahman
2014	Premalaya	Telugu (Dubbed version)	Hey Hey Mister	Haricharan	A. R. Rahman
2014	Raunaq	Hindi	Laadli	Lata Mangeshkar, A. R. Rahman (as backing vocals female)	A. R. Rahman
2014	Ungli	Hindi	Pakeezah		Gulraj Singh
2015	MTV Unplugged Season 6	Arabic	Banjaara	Mohammed Irfaan	Mithoon
2015	Coffee Ani Barach Kahi	Marathi	Rang He Nave Nave; Coffee Ani Barach Kahi (Title Song)		Aditya Bedekar
2015	Bollywood Unwind (Album)	Hindi	Man Kyun Behka; Kya Yahi Pyar Hai		Rearranged/ Reprogrammed by Ajay Singha (Miko)
2015	OK Kanmani	Tamil	Kaara Aattaakkaara; Paranthu Sella Vaa; Naane Varugiraen		A.R Rahman
2015	OK Kanmani	Telugu (Dubbed version)	Raara Aatagaada; Maayedho Cheyyava; Yedho Adaganaa		A.R Rahman
2015	Mariyaan	Telugu (Dubbed version)	Ninna Thanuvundhi	Vijay Prakash	A.R Rahman
2015	Soulful Aartis	Awadhi/ Brij	Aarti Kunjabihari Ki; Aarti Keeje Hanuman; Jai Lakshmi Maata; Shree Ramchandra Kripalu	Arranged by Kedar Pandit	Strumm Music
2015	Paayum Puli	Tamil	Silukku Marame	Divya Kumar	D. Imman
2015	Sony Mix - Jam Room 2	Hindi	Babuji Dheere Chalna; Yeh Ladka Haaye Allah		Re-arranged by Ajay Singha (Miko); Composed by O.P. Nayyar and RD Burman Respectively
2015	Columbus	Telugu	Tummeda	Naresh Iyer]]	Jithin Roshan
2015	Gethu	Tamil	Thaen Kattru	Haricharan	Harris Jayaraj
2016	Guppedantha Prema	Telugu	Naalo Alajadedho (with Navneeth Sundar); Yedhalo Yello (with Karthik)	Navneeth Sundar	Vinod Lingala
2016	And Jara Hatke	Marathi	Umaloon Aale	Aditya Bedekar	Prakash Kunte
2016	Muhammad: The Messenger of God (Iranian Film)		Ya Muhammad; Ababeel; Last Hajj (with AR Rahman) (FBV)		A. R. Rahman
2016	24	Tamil	Punnagaye	Haricharan	A. R. Rahman
2016	24	Telugu	Daivam Rasina Kavitha	Haricharan	A. R. Rahman
2016	Policeodu (Dubbed version)	Telugu	Ammukutti	Hemachandra	G. V. Prakash Kumar
2016	Sarbjit	Hindi	Allah Hu Allah		Tanishk Bagchi
2016	Achcham Enbadhu Madamaiyada	Tamil	Rasaali	Sathyaprakash	A. R. Rahman
2016	Sahasam Swasaga Sagipo	Telugu	Chakori	Sathyaprakash	A. R. Rahman
2016	Meenkuzhambum Manpaanayum	Tamil	Adhe Nila	Sathyaprakash	D. Imman
2016	Amma Kanakku	Tamil	Indha Vazhkai	Ilaiyaraaja	Ashwini Iyer Tewari
2016	Mohenjo Daro	Hindi	Sarsariya	Shashwat Singh	A. R. Rahman
2016	Kotigabba 2	Kannada	Hunna Hunna		D. Imman
2016	Mudinja Ivana Pudi	Tamil	Laama Laama		D. Imman
2016	Kavalai Vendam	Tamil	Un Kadhal Irundhal Podhum	Armaan Mallik	Leon James
2016	Lamhe'z (Album)	Hindi	Sukha Samandar		Debashish Debu Banerji
2016	Shenbaga Kottai	Tamil	Manam Manam	Ranjith	Ratheesh Vegha
2016	Kattappava Kanom	Tamil	Kangalai Suttrum Kanavugalai (with Sathyaprakash Dharmar)	Santhosh Dhayanidhi	Sony Music
2017	OK Jaanu	Hindi	Humma Humma	Badshah (rapper), Jubin Nautiyal	A. R. Rahman (original composer); Recreated by Badshah (rapper), Tanishk Bagchi
2017	OK Jaanu	Hindi	Sun Bhavara; Humma Humma; Kaara Fankaara		A. R. Rahman
2017	Vinodan	Tamil	Mega Ragame (Palindrome Song)	D. Imman	Victor Jayaraj
2017	Machine	Hindi	Itna Tumhe	Tanishk Bagchi	Abbas-Mustan
2017	Kaatru Veliyidai	Tamil	Vaan Varuvaan	A.R Rahman	Mani Ratnam
2017	Kaatru Veliyidai	Telugu	Maimaarupaa	A.R Rahman	Mani Ratnam
2017	Half Girlfriend	Hindi	"Baarish"	Ash King	Tanishk Bagchi
2017	Half Girlfriend	Hindi	"Phir Bhi Tumko Chaahunga"	Arijit Singh	Mithoon
2017	Bollywood Unwind 4	Hindi	Surmayee Akhiyon Mein; Yaar Bina Chain	Ilaiyaraaja; Rearranged by Ajay Singha	Strumm Music
2017	Tunch Mhojem Jivit (Album)	Konkani	Tunch Mhojem Jivit	Johnny D'Cunha	Milroy Goes
2017	Sema	Tamil	Nenje Nenje (with Siddharth Mahadevan)	G.V. Prakash Kumar	Think Music India
2017	Lafz Unkahe	Hindi (Independent)	Tera Hoon Main	Ajay Singha (Miko)	Strumm sound
2017	Podhuvaga Emmanasu Thangam	Tamil	Ammani (with Deluckshan)	D. Imman	Think Music India
2017	Vivegam	Tamil	Kaadhalada	Pradeep	Anirudh Ravichander
2017	Vivegam	Telugu	Aanandam		Anirudh Ravichander
2017	Mom	Hindi	O Sona Tere Liye	A. R. Rahman	A.R.Rahman
2017	Mom	Hindi	Chal Kahin Door		A.R.Rahman
2017	Jab Harry Met Sejal	Tamil	Radha (Tamil) - Vandhaalae Radha	Pritam	Imtiaz Ali/Sony Music India
2017	Jab Harry Met Sejal	Telugu	Radha (Telugu) - Nene Nee Radha	Pritam	Imtiaz Ali/Sony Music India
2017	Shubh Mangal Saavdhan	Hindi	Kanha/ The Kanha Song		Tanishk - Vayu
2017	Shubh Mangal Saavdhan	Hindi	Kankad		Tanishk - Vayu
2017	Karuppan	Tamil	Karuva Karuva (with Shankar Mahadevan)	D. Imman	R. Panneerselvam
2017	Abhiyum Anuvum	Tamil	Saregama Pathaneesa (with Haricharan)	Dharan	Saregama
2017	Solo	Tamil	Uyiraagi	Agam	Bejoy Nambiar; Trend Music
2017	Solo	Malayalam	Thaalolam	Agam	Bejoy Nambiar; Trend Music
2017	Tumhari Sulu	Hindi	Hawa Hawai 2.0	Kavita Krishnamurthy	Recreated by Tanishk Bagchi
2017	Theeram Adhigaaram Ondru	Tamil	Oru Veettil	Ghibran	T-Series / Aditya Music
2017	Thittam Poattu Thirudura Koottam	Tamil	Marmamaai	Ashwath	Lahari Music
2018	2.0 (film)	Tamil	Endhira Logathu	Sid Sriram	A.R. Rahman
2018	2.0 (film)	Hindi (Dubbed version)	Mechanical Sundariye	Armaan Malik	A.R. Rahman
2018	2.0 (film)	Telugu (Dubbed version)	Yanthara Lokapu	Sid Sriram	A.R. Rahman
2018	Sketch	Tamil	"Vaanam Thoorammalae (Afreen Afreen)"	Deepak Subramaniam, Roshini	S. Thaman
2018	Enai Noki Paayum Thota	Tamil	Visiri	Sid Sriram	Darbuka Siva, Gautham Vasudev Menon
2018	Sufi Songs (Single)	Hindi	Ishq Ka Silsila	Kshitij Tarey	Strumm Sound
2018	Youngraad	Marathi	Saye	Hriday Gattani	Zee music marathi
2018	Gold	Hindi	Mono Bina	Monali Thakur, Yasser Desai	Tanishk Bagchi
2018	Lust Stories (Netflix)	Hindi	"Motorcycle"		Tanishk-Vayu
2018	Bogada	Marathi	"Anolkhi Vaat"	Siddharth Mahadevan-Soumil Shringarpure	Zee Music Company
2018	Aaina	Hindi	"Aaina" (Single)	Adil-Shaad	Indian Task Force
2018	Namaste England	Hindi	"Kya Kahoon Janeman"	Mannan Shaah	
2018	Next Enti?	Telugu	Na Nuve Na	Leon James	T-Series (company)
2018	Kajra/ Uden Jab Jab Zulfein (Recreation)	Hindi	Kismat	Shashaa Tirupati (Original Composer: OP Nayyar)	Saregama India
2019	Sarvam Thaala Mayam	Telugu (Dubbed version)	Maya Maya	A.R. Rahman	JioMusic
2019	Waah Zindagi	Hindi	"Bhaari Bhaari" (Kazoo)	Mohan Kannan	Parag Chhabra
2019	Kodathi Samaksham Balan Vakkeel	Malayalam	Onnum Mindathe	Gopi Sundar	Zee Music South
2019	Kaagar	Marathi	"Lagliya Godi Tujhi" (with Harshwardhan Wavre)	AV Prafullachandra	Zee Music Company (Marathi)
2019	Moh	Hindi	Moh Soundtrack Song	Pratik	ZEE5 originals
2019	Pathinettam Padi	Malayalam	Changoota Kaara	AH Kashif	Goodwill entertainment
2019	'String Of Air' (Original)	English	'String of Air'	Shashaa Tirupati	Apple Music, YouTube, Spotify
2019	Jersey	Telugu	Prapanchame Alaa	Anirudh Ravichander	Sony Music South
2019	Bigil	Tamil	Singappenney	A.R. Rahman	A. R. Rahman
2019	Yaana	Kannada	Awasara	Joshua Sridhar	Lahari Music
2019	Oceans Rained (Original)	English	Oceans Rained	Shashaa Tirupati	YouTube, iTunes, Spotify, JioSaavn
2019	Kuchh Bhi Na Mera (Single)	Hindi	Kuchh Bhi Na Mera (with Osho Jain)	Osho Jain	(Independent)
2019	Namma Veettu Pillai	Tamil	"Unkoodave Porakkanum (Sister's Version)"	D. Imman	Sun TV
2019	Puppy	Tamil	Anji Manikku (with Yuvanshankar Raja)	Dharan Kumar	Sony Music South
2019	Evvarikee Cheppoddu	Telugu	Avuna Nijamena	Sankar Sarma	Adithya Music
2019	Sivappu Manjal Pachai	Tamil	Mayilaanjiye	Siddhu Kumar	
2019	Sivappu Manjal Pachai	Tamil	Idhu Dhaan	Siddhu Kumar	
2019	"Beparwahi" (Original)	Hindi	"Beparwahi"	Hriday Gattani	Shashaa Tirupati
2019	Sye Raa Narasimha Reddy	Telugu	"Andam Ankitam"	Amit Trivedi	T-Series, Lahari Music
2019	Sye Raa Narasimha Reddy	Tamil	"Angam Unnidam"	Amit Trivedi	T-Series, Lahari Music
2019	Thoota	Telugu	"Yetu Manam Pogalam"	Darbuka Siva	
2019	Whistle	Telugu	"Sivangivey"	A. R. Rahman	A. R. Rahman
2019	"Hum Kahaan Hain" (Original)	Hindi	"Hum Kahaan Hain"	Shashaa Tirupati	Independent Release
2019	Mamangam	Hindi	"Boondon Se"	M. Jayachandran	T-Series
2020	"Yezhundhu Vaa" (Original)	Tamil	"Yezhundhu Vaa"	Chinmayi Sripaada	Shashaa Tirupati
2020	V	Telugu	"Manasu Maree"	Amit Trivedi	Think Music
2020	Joshua Imai Pol Kaakha	Tamil	"Hey Love"	Karthik	Ondraga Entertainment
2020	"Aashna Ban Jaayein" (Women's Day Single)	Hindi	Vasuda Sharma, Shreya Ghoshal, Neeti Mohan, Various	Vasuda Sharma	Independent
2020	"Guzar Jayega" (Single)	Hindi	"Guzar Jayega"	Amitabh Bachchan, Multiple Artists	Jazim Sharma, Varun Gupta
2020	"Hum Haar Nahin Maanenge" (Single)	Hindi	"Hum Haar Nahin Maanenge" Feat. Multiple Artists		A. R. Rahman
2020	Dil Bechara	Hindi	Khulke Jeena Ka	Arijit Singh	A. R. Rahman
2020	'Leprechaun Love' (Original)	English	Original	Ft. Marc D Muse	Independent
2020	'Paris Paris' (Queen Remake)	Tamil	"Padaigal Illai Endru"	Arun Kamath	Amit Trivedi
2020	'Paris Paris' (Queen Remake)	Tamil	Iduva En Bhoomi	Nikita Gandhi	Amit Trivedi
2020	"'Oh Mere Bhai'"	Hindi	Radio Single - Rakhi Special	Ravi	Amit Trivedi
2020	'Naam Adaa Likhna' (Cover)	Hindi	Ft. Jay - Parthiv	Shantanu Moitra	Times Music
2020	"Chaudhavin Ka Chand" (Cover)	Hindi	Shashaa Tirupati	Ravi/ Mohd. Rafi	Saregama Music
2020	Umeed	Hindi	Umeed	Shashaa Tirupati	Vinayak
2020	Oh Fish	Telugu	"Mathu Mathu"	Sreenidhi Venkat	Kettles Studios
2020	Oh Fish	Kannada	Aaramagiro	Sanjith Hegde	Kettles Studios
2020	Mayangumoru Maalai Neram	Tamil	Mayangumoru Maalai Neram	Sahithya Rajith	Sahithya Rajith
2020	Kyun / This Is What You Came For (Single)	Hindi	"Kyun - Hindi Version"	DJ Akhil Talreja	
2020	"Sunday Night" (Single)	Telugu	"Sunday Night"	Prashanth R. Vihari	Sony Music India
2020	Zindagi Bhar Nahin (Cover)	Hindi	Shashaa Tirupati	Ravi/ Mohd. Rafi	Saregama Music
2020	Dhruva Natchathiram	Tamil	"Oru Manam"	Karthik	Harris Jayaraj
2020	"Siyaahii"	Hindi	Papon, Sid Paul	Shashaa Tirupati	Independent
2020	"Raat" (Single)	Hindi	Sid Paul		Independent
2020	"Po Irave" (Single)	Tamil	Sid Paul		Independent
2020	"Girl in the City" (Single)	English	(Ft. Wazim - Murali)	Wazim - Murali	Songfest India
2021	"Aao Na" (Indie Original)	Hindi	"Be Asar"	Rajiv Sundaresan	
2021	Un Tholil Naan Saaya (Indie Original)	Tamil	"Un Tholil Naan Saaya"	Keba Jeremiah	Shashaa Tirupati
2021	"Meri Pukaar Suno" (Single)	Hindi	Ft. Gulzar, Chithra, Shreya Ghoshal, Alka Yagnik, Sadhana Sargam, Asees Kaur, Armaan Mallik	A. R. Rahman	A. R. Rahman
2021	Mimi	Hindi	"Hututu"	A. R. Rahman	A. R. Rahman
2021	Oh Manapenne	Tamil	Bodhai Kaname (with Anirudh Ravichander)	Vishal Chandrashekhar	Think Music India
2021	Navarasa	Hindi	Chhodo Mori Baiyyaan (with Mahesh Raghavan, Nandini)	Traditional	Mani Ratnam
2021	Raja Vikramarka	Telugu	"Sammathame"	Karthik, Chaitra Ambadipudi	Prashanth R Vihari
2021	Atrangi Re	Hindi	"Rait Zara Si"	Arijit Singh	A.R. Rahman
2021	Atrangi Re	Tamil	"Kaadhalai Solla Mudiyatha"	Yazin Nizar	A.R. Rahman
2021	99 Songs	Hindi	Soja Soja	Nikita Gandhi	A. R. Rahman
2021	99 Songs	Hindi	Humnawaa	Armaan Malik	A. R. Rahman
2021	99 Songs	Tamil	Poyisonna Posikiduven	Nikita Gandhi	A. R. Rahman
2021	99 Songs	Tamil	Punnagai Maayai	Abhay Jodhpurkar	A. R. Rahman
2021	99 Songs	Telugu	Jola Jola	Nikita Gandhi	A. R. Rahman
2021	99 Songs	Telugu	Choosa Maaye llaa	Nakul Abhyankar	A. R. Rahman
2022	Badhaai Do	Hindi	"Hum Thay Seedhe Saadhe - Female Version"		Amit Trivedi
2022	Badhaai Do	Hindi	"Hum Rang Hai"	Nakash Aziz, Amit Trivedi	Amit Trivedi
2022	Kaathu Vaakula Rendu Kaadhal	Tamil	"Naan Pizhai"	Ravi G	Anirudh Ravichander
2022	I'm Sorry, Heart (EP)	English	"In My Skin"	Ft. Keba Jeremiah	Shashaa Tirupati (Independent/ Vantablack)
2022	I'm Sorry, Heart (EP)	English	"I'm Sorry, Heart"	Ft. Keba Jeremiah	Shashaa Tirupati (Independent/ Vantablack)
2022	I'm Sorry, Heart (EP)	English	"Pretend"	Ft. Keba Jeremiah	Shashaa Tirupati (Independent/ Vantablack)
2022	I'm Sorry, Heart (EP)	English	"Medieval Minds"	Ft. Keba Jeremiah	Shashaa Tirupati (Independent/ Vantablack)
2022	I'm Sorry, Heart (EP)	English	"Medieval Minds - Bonus"	Harry Nicholson	Shashaa Tirupati (Independent/ Vantablack)
2022	Modern Love Mumbai	Hindi	"Shuru Se Shuru"	Shankar Mahadevan	Shankar Ehasaan Loy
2022	Modern Love Mumbai	Hindi	"Hum He Hum"	Sameer Rahat	
2022	Nachdi Phira by Shashaa Tirupati (Cover)	Hindi	"Nachdi Phira"		Zee Music Company
2022	Perth - Tamil Cover	Tamil	"Perth"		Shashaa Tirupati
2022	Roohani	Hindi	"Roohani"		Khamosh Shah
2022	Maja Ma	Hindi	"Songs of Celebration"	Osman Mir	Shishir Samant
2022	Mili	Hindi	Tum Bhi Raahi	A. R. Rahman	
2022	Jee Laange Yaara	Punjabi	"Jee Laange Yaara"		Jaidev Kumar
2022	Irada Nek Hai	Hindi	"Irada Nek Hai"		Dr. Amit Kamle
2022	Rab Varga (Single)	Punjabi	Rab Varga	Shashaa Tirupati	Sham Balkar (Zee Music Company)
2023	Aisi Toh Koi Baat (Single)	Hindi	Aisi Toh Koi Baat	Rahul Joshi	Sunny Inder (Zee Music Company)
2023	Zindagi Ki Chashni (Single)	Hindi	Zindagi Ki Chashni	Arjun Adapalli	Arjun Adapalli (Independent)
2023	Rang Jin Daaro (Single)	Hindi	Rang Jin Daaro	Shashaa Tirupati	Pt. Ramashray Jha (Music Production: Shashaa Tirupati)
2023	Kiss me when I'm numb (Single)	English	Kiss me when I'm numb	Shashaa Tirupati	Shashaa Tirupati (Independent/ Vantablack Records)
2023	Ik Raanjha	Punjabi	Ik Raanjha	Shivam Mahadevan	Shashaa Tirupati (Independent/ Vantablack Records), Sid Paul (Music Production)
2023	Dildaareya	Hindi	Dildaareya	Shashaa Tirupati	Composed by Shashaa Tirupati
2023	Jhumka X Kabhi Aar Kabhi Paar	Hindi	Jhumka X Kabhi Aar Kabhi Paar	Shashaa Tirupati	Vincent Joseph (Mixed and Mastered)
2023	Dhak Dhak	Hindi	Woh Tara	Shannon Donald & Shashaa Tirupati	Raghav & Arjun
2023	Jhalleyaa	Punjabi	Jhalleyaa	Shashaa Tirupati ft.Elephant Gym	Published By: Record Thirty-Nine
2023	Like Sand We Flow	English	Like Sand We Flow	Shashaa Tirupati, Kanishk Seth, Sanjeeta Bhattacharya.	Published by: Record Thirty-Nine
2024	Ayalaan	Tamil	Chella Rangi	Sanjith Hegde	A. R. Rahman
2024	Joshua: Imai Pol Kaakha	Tamil	Hey Love		Karthik
2024	All About You	English	All About You	Shashaa Tirupati	Published by: Record Thirty-Nine
2024	Vaanmugil	Tamil	Vaanmugil	Nishad G, Shashaa Tirupati, Sreekanth Hariharan, Anjana JP, Rishi K	The Indoencers
2024	Bahaanay	Hindi	Bahaanay	Shashaa Tirupati, Valter Soosalu	Published by: Record Thirty-Nine
2024	Hoon Galat	Hindi	Hoon Galat	Shashaa Tirupati, Mesbah Ghamsari	Published by: Record Thirty-Nine
2024	Uyiralaye	Tamil	Uyiralaye	Ashwin Vinayagamoorthy, Shashaa Tirupati	Haiku Music Company
2024	Kaagaa Jaa Re	Hindi	Kaagaa Jaa Re	Shashaa Tirupati, Shakthisree Gopalan, Abhay Jodhpurkar, Vinayak Shukla	Published by: Record Thirty-Nine Audio Distribution: Horus Music (India)
2024	Toh Bio	Farsi	Toh Bio	Shashaa Tirupati, Mesbah Ghamsari	
2024	Paani	Marathi	Tuya Saathina	Gulraj Singh, Shashaa Tirupati, Adinath Kothare	Rajshri Marathi
2024	Bairi Piya - Cover Version	Hindi	Bairi Piya - Cover Version	Shashaa Tirupati, Ismail Darbar	Universal Music India Pvt. Ltd.
2024	Khonok Aandam	Persian	Khonok Aandam	Shashaa Tirupati, Mesbah Ghamsari	Music Arranged and Produced By Mesbah Ghamsari
2025	Maari	Tamil	Maari	Shashaa Tirupati, Mesbah Ghamsari	Published by: Record Thirty-Nine Audio Distribution: Horus Music
2025	Meghalu Cheppina Prema Katha	Teugu	"Sound Of Love"	Shashaa Tirupati, S P Charan, Rehman	Justin Prabhakaran
2025	Zara	Hindi	Zara	Shashaa Tirupati, Nasir Hameed	Produced by Alex Shahbaz
2025	Rang Gehra	Hindi	Rang Gehra	Shashaa Tirupati	Manoj Sharrma
2025	The Wedding Acoustic Mashup	Hindi	Mahiye Jinna Sohna x Tujhe Kitna Chahne Lage (Cover)	Shashaa Tirupati, Vivek Khati	Shashaa Tirupati
2025	Kattrukkan - Kural No. 686 - Single	Tamil	Kattrukkan - Kural No. 686	Shashaa Tirupati	Lydian Nadhaswaram
2025	Love OTP	Kannada	Dhruvathare	Shashaa Tirupati	Anand Rajavikram
2025	Love OTP	Telugu	Vanamali	Shashaa Tirupati	Anand Rajavikram
2025	Funky Saiyaan	Hindi	Funky Saiyaan	Shashaa Tirupati	Anjjan Bhattacharya
2026	Sukkee Rooh	Punjabi	Sukkee Rooh	Shashaa Triupati, Sina Drums, Avanti Patel	Composition & Original Arrangement: Shashaa Tirupati
2026	EP MAAHIRR	Hindi	Raynnn	Shashaa Triupati, Ben Parag	Compostion & Lyrics Shashaa Tirupati Music Production Shabeer
2026	EP MAAHIRR	Punjaibi	Heerr	Shashaa Tirupati, Akanksha Bandari	Compostion & Lyrics Shashaa Tirupati Music Production Shabeer
2026	EP MAAHIRR	Hindi	Kaisay	Shashaa Tirupati	Compostion & Lyrics Shashaa Tirupati Music Production Shabeer
2026	EP MAAHIRR	Hindi	Chakkee	Shashaa Tirupati, Digvijay Singh Pariyar	Compostion & Lyrics Shashaa Tirupati Music Production Shabeer

== Awards and nominations ==
Year	Award	Category	Film	Song	Result
2020	SIIMA Awards	Best Female Playback Singer	Sivappu Manjal Pachai	Mayilaanjiye	Nominated
2019	Asiavision Awards	Best Female Singer National	Robot 2.0; Namaste England	Endhira Logathu Sundariye; Kya Kahoon Jaaneman	Won
2018	Filmfare Awards South (2018)	Best Female Playback Singer	Kaatru Veliyidai	Vaan Varuvaan	Won
2018	National film awards 2018	Best female playback singer	Kaatru Veliyidai	Vaan Varuvan	Won
2018	Vijay Awards	Best Female Playback Singer	Kaatru Veliyidai	Vaan Varuvaan	Nominated
2018	Zee ETC Business Award	Best Romantic Song of the Year	Half Girlfriend	Phir Bhi Tumko Chaahunga (with Arijit Singh)	Nominated
2018	Mirchi Music Awards	Raga Inspired Song of the Year	OK Jaanu	Sunn Bhavara	Won
2018	Mirchi Music Awards	Listener's Choice Song of the Year	Half Girlfriend	Phir Bhi Tumko Chahunga	Won
2018	Mirchi Music Awards	Best Song of the Year	Half Girlfriend	Baarish	Nominated
2018	Filmfare Award	Best Female Playback Singer	Shubh Mangal Saavdhan	Kanha	Nominated
2018	Zee Cine Award	Best Female Singer Female	Shubh Mangal Savdhan	Kanha	Nominated
2018	Zee Cine Award	Viewer's Choice - Best Song of the Year	Half Girlfriend	Baarish	Won
2018	Star Screen Awards	Best Female Playback	Shubh Mangal Savdhan	Kanha	Won
2017	SIIMA Award	Best Female Singer	Achcham Enbadhu Madaiyada	Rasaali	Nominated
2016	SIIMA Award	Best Female Singer	OK Kanmani	Parandhu Sella Vaa	Nominated
2015	Vikatan Awards	Best Female Singer	OK Kanmani	Naane Varugiren	Won
2015	IIFA Awards (Tamil)	Best Female Singer	OK Kanmani	Kaara Aattakaara	Nominated
2015	Mirchi Music Awards	Best Female Singer Upcoming	Kaaviyathalaivan	Aye Mr. Minor	Won
