= Bilqees Khanum =

Pakistani singer (1939–2022)

- بلقیس خانم
- Born: 25 December 1948; Garhi Shahu, Lahore, Pakistan
- Died: 21 December 2022 (aged 73); Karachi, Pakistan
- Occupations: Singer, Hindustani classical music and Ghazals
- Years active: 1964 - 2022
- Known for: Singing voluntarily for Pakistan Army soldiers on the fronts during the Indo-Pakistani war of 1965
- Television: PTV (Pakistani television channel)
- Spouse: Ustaad Rais Khan (m. 1980)
- Children: 2
- Relatives: Mohsin Raza (brother)
- Awards: Pride of Performance Award by the Government of Pakistan in 2018

Bilqees Khanum (Urdu: بلقیس خانم; 25 December 1948 – 21 December 2022) was a Pakistani classical music singer. She is known for singing ghazals and geets like "Kuch Din To Baso Meri Ankhon Mein", "Anokha Laadla Khelan Ko Mangay Chand", and "Mat Samjho Hum Ne Bhula Diya".

== Early life and family ==
Khanum was born on 25 December 1948, in a middle-class family in Garhi Shahu, Lahore, Pakistan. Her mother was a housewife, and her father Abdul Haq worked as a furniture maker. Of their seven children — five girls and two boys —Khanum was the oldest. Because of her family’s financial hardship, she couldn't continue her education beyond elementary school. Her early childhood years were spent in Faisalabad, Pakistan. She used to perform songs at school festivals. At a young age, she studied singing with her maternal grandfather, Inayat Ali Khan, Ustad Muhammad Sharif and Ustad Ashiq Ali Khan of Karachi. One of Khanum's brothers, Mohsin Raza, is a music composer.

== Career ==
Khanum started her singing career in 1964 from Radio Pakistan. She was one of the artists who applied during PTV's initial test transmission in 1965. She sang several patriotic songs during the 1965 India-Pakistan War. Her vocalization of poet Habib Jalib's "Mat samjho hum nay bhula diya, Ye mitti tumko pyari thee, Iss mitti main hee sula diya" was a memorial tribute to the war heroes of 1965.

According to a major newspaper of Pakistan, "Bilquis Khanum's main contribution has been singing voluntarily for Pakistan Army on the front lines during the 1965 War".

Khanum also performed as a playback singer for some Lollywood movies. She sang under the music direction of Khalil Ahmad, Nashad, G.A. Chishti, Nisar Bazmi, Sohail Rana, Bakhshi Wazir, Rehman Verma, Safdar Hussain, and others. Her singing career lasted for over 45 years.

== Personal life ==
Bilqees Khanum met the notable sitar player of Mewati gharana of India, Ustaad Rais Khan (1939 - 2017) at Karachi in 1978. At the time, he was visiting Pakistan for a concert. Their few meetings soon "blossomed into love".

In 1980, Khanum married Rais Khan, who later got Pakistani nationality and settled in Karachi in 1986 with his fourth wife Khanum.

Bilqees Khanum and Rais Khan had two sons, Farhan Rais Khan and Hazoor Hasnain Rais Khan. Both of them are sitar players like their famous father and live in Pakistan.

== Death ==
After a prolonged illness, Khanum died in Karachi on 21 December 2022. The prime minister of Pakistan Shehbaz Sharif offered his condolences over her death and acknowledged her services for the music world.

== Awards ==
Year	Award	Category	Result	Work	Ref.
2018	Pride of Performance Award	Arts	Won	Singing	

== Discography ==
=== Radio/TV ===
Song title	Lyrics by	Music by
"Mat samjho hum ne bhula diya, Yeh mitti tumko pyari thee, Iss mitti mein hee sula diya"	Habib Jalib	
"Anokha Laadla Khelan Ko Mangay Chand"	Asad Muhammad Khan	Ustad Ashiq Ali Khan
"Kuch din to buso meri aankhon mein"	Obaidullah Aleem	Ustad Nazar Hussain
"Woh to khushbu hai hawaon main bikhar jayega"	Parveen Shakir	Nisar Bazmi
"Sakal ban phool rahi sarson"	Ameer Khusro	Ameer Khusro
"Amma meray baba ko bhejo ri"	Ameer Khusro	Ameer Khusro

=== Film ===
Song title	Lyrics by	Music by	Film
"Pyar Di Khatir Ban Geye Jogi.. Rab Sajna Di Kahir Karay"	Khawaja Pervaiz	Bakhshi-Wazir	Melay Sajna De (1972)
