= Asad Khan (sitarist) =

- Born: Gulrez Khan; 1982 (age 43–44); Ahmedabad, Gujarat, India
- Origin: India
- Genres: Indian classical music; jazz; flamenco; rock; classical
- Occupations: Sitarist; composer; music director
- Instrument: Sitar
- Years active: 2008–present

Asad Khan (born 20 August 1982) is an Indian sitarist, music composer, and director. He is known for his sitar playing on popular Bollywood films and being a hereditary musician of the Mewati gharana.

== Early life and education ==
Asad Khan was born "Gulrez Khan" to Siraj Khan, the current khalifa of Mewati gharana. Khan represents the sixth generation of the Mewati lineage of Wahid Khan (beenkar). He was born in family of sitar players that includes Rais Khan.

Khan studied sitar with his father, Siraj, and maternal great-uncle, Ghulam Qadir Khan, and is a ganda-bandh disciple of both .

== Career ==
An internationally accomplished sitar player, Asad has experimented with Indian classical music and western genres such as jazz, flamenco, rock and classical. He has shared the stage with Indian artist A. R. Rahman, and with several western artists including Herbie Hancock, India Arie, Ann Marie Calhoun, Barry Manilow, Colbie Caillat and Jamiroquai. He has performed at London Philharmonic Orchestra, Norwegian Radio Orchestra and at Deutsches Filmorchester Babelsberg. In 2010, he, along with Rahman, performed at the 2010 Nobel Peace Prize Concert. His tracks, "Mausam" and "Escape", in the film Slumdog Millionaire received well.

=== Film work ===
He has worked in the films such as Slumdog Millionaire (2008), Jodhaa Akbar (2008), Raavan (2010), and in the Commonwealth Games theme song. He has worked as a music director for films including Beiimaan Love (2016), Dongari Ka Raja (2016), Sameer (2017), 1921 (2018), and Amavas (2019).

== Filmography ==
As a music director

Year	Movie
2016	Beiimaan Love
2016	Dongari Ka Raja
2017	Sameer
2018	1921
2019	Amavas

As a sitarist

Year	Song
2008	Slumdog Millionaire
2008	Jodhaa Akbar
2010	Jhootha Hi Sahi
2010	Raavan
2013	Raanjhanaa
2014	Million Dollar Arm
2014	Queen
2021	Navarasa

== Awards and nominations ==
Year	Song	Award	Category	Result	Ref.
2016	"Rang Reza"	Mirchi Music Awards	Mirchi Music Award for Upcoming Male Vocalist of The Year	Nominated	
