= Lady Kash and Krissy =

Singaporean-Indian rapper and singer duo

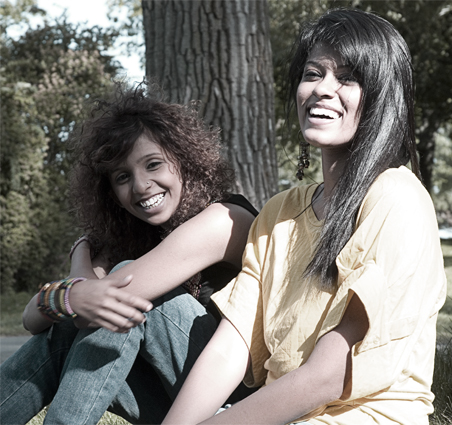
- Lady Kash (left) and Krissy (right)

Background information
- Origin: Singapore
- Genres: Pop, hip hop, rap, urban & world
- Years active: 2008–2012
- Label: Independent
- Past members: Kalaivani Nagaraj; Saradha Vidianand Das

Lady Kash and Krissy, sometimes credited as Kash n' Krissy, were a Singaporean Indian rapper-singer duo that was formed in September 2008 by Kalaivani Nagaraj, known as Lady Kash, and Saradha Vidianand Das, known as Krissy. The duo disbanded in December 2012.

== History ==
Kalaivani Nagaraj and Saradha Vidianand Das met each other during their mid-teens on a social networking website in 2006.

== Career ==
In 2007, Nagaraj began her musical career as a rapper, as Lady Kash. In September 2008, Nagaraj and Das formed Lady Kash and Krissy as a rapper-singer duo.

Indian singer Benny Dayal, who had heard the duo's vocals after sound testing for a Kannada film, put the duo in contact with A. R. Rahman, who recorded with them the soundtrack "Irumbile Oru Irudhaiyam" in the 2010 film Enthiran. The duo also wrote the English lyrics for the song. Rahman later had them contribute to "Semmozhiyaana Thamizh Mozhiyaam", the theme song of the World Classical Tamil Conference 2010. Lady Kash and Krissy, along with Shreya Ghoshal, sang "Dochey", composed by Rahman for the Telugu film Puli.

== Awards ==
In March 2011, Lady Kash and Krissy performed at the charity concert Sangarsh in Chennai. Later that year, they were nominated under several categories for the VIMA Music Awards 2011, and won second place in the Best Music Video category for their charity single "One".

The duo performed at MediaCorp's Hello 2012 event in Singapore. In December 2012, they performed at the Kuala Lumpur International Indian Music Festival in Malaysia.

In December 2012, the duo disbanded on good terms, to concentrate on their individual careers.

The duo won the VIMA 2013 award for Social Media Champion of Southeast Asia.

In 2014, Lady Kash and Krissy reunited temporarily to perform "Wanna Mash Up" for the soundtrack for the Hindi film Highway.

== Discography ==
=== Singles ===
Song	Released	Music producer
"Friction"	2008	Charles Bosco
"It's Your Time"	2009	Kausikan S.
"Wherever You Are" (remix)	2009	Kausikan S.
"Still You"	2010	Lohit Seven
"One" (charity single)	2010	Lohit Seven
"Take Me Home Tonight" (ft. Augie Abatecola)	2012	Moe Masri
"Rocketeer" (cover)	2012	The Stereotypes, The Smeezingtons

=== Soundtracks ===
Song	Released	Album	Composer	Co-singers	Lyrics	Label
"Semmozhiyaana Thamizh Mozhiyaam"	2010	World Classical Tamil Conference 2010 theme song	A. R. Rahman	Various artists	M. Karunanidhi	A. R. Rahman
"Dochey"	2010	Komaram Puli (Telugu)	A. R. Rahman	Shreya Ghoshal	Lady Kash, Krissy, Chandrabose	Sony Music
"Irumbile Oru Irudhaiyam"	2010	Enthiran	A. R. Rahman	A. R. Rahman	Lady Kash, Krissy, Madhan Karky	Think Music India
"Naina Miley"	2010	Enthiran (Hindi)	A. R. Rahman	A. R. Rahman, Lady Kash, Suzanne D’Mello, Krissy	Lady Kash, Krissy, Swanand Kirkire	Venus
"Bathing at Cannes"	2010	Engeyum Kaadhal	Harris Jayaraj	Emcee Jesz, Ranina Reddy	Lady Kash, Emcee Jesz	Sony Music
"Gaana Bajaana"	2010	Gaana Bajaana (Kannada)	Joshua Sridhar	Joshua Sridhar, Sayanora Philip		
"Priyankari" (remix)	2010	The Thriller soundtrack	Dharan Kumar	Benny Dayal, Mamtha Mohandas	Lady Kash, Hari Narayanan	Manorama Music
"Pickle Jar"	2011	Pickles: The Film soundtrack	T.R. Krishna Chetan	Benny Dayal, Mamtha Mohandas	MK	Manorama Music
"Wanna Mash Up"	2014	Highway (Hindi)	A. R. Rahman	A. R. Rahman, Suvi Suresh		

=== Other ===
- "Trash" (also titled "Cheththa", "Kachra", "Kuppa" and "Kuppai") by Rahul Nambiar, featuring Lady Kash and Krissy (who also wrote the English lyrics), released in March 2014.
