= Kochadaiiyaan (soundtrack) =

2014 soundtrack album by A. R. Rahman

- Soundtrack album cover

Soundtrack album by A. R. Rahman
- Released: 9 March 2014
- Recorded: December 2011–2014
- Studios: Panchathan Record Inn and AM Studios, Chennai; Panchathan Hollywood Studios, Los Angeles; AIR Studios, London
- Language: Tamil
- Label: Sony Music India
- Producer: A. R. Rahman

A. R. Rahman chronology
Highway (2014)	Kochadaiiyaan (2014)	Million Dollar Arm (2014)

Singles from Kochadaiiyaan
- 1. "Engae Pogudho Vaanam" Released: 7 October 2013

Kochadaiiyaan is the soundtrack album composed by A. R. Rahman to the motion capture animated Tamil film of the same name directed by Soundarya R. Ashwin. The original version as well as the dubbed Telugu version of the soundtrack (titled Vikramasimha) was released on 9 March 2014. The Hindi version was released online on Eros Now on 13 March 2014. Upon its release, the soundtrack became the first Tamil film music album to trend on Twitter and top the iTunes India charts.

== Development ==
Initially, A. R. Rahman dithered to compose the soundtrack album as he was well aware of the time taken for the completion of performance capture films. Later, he agreed to compose after being convinced by the director that the filming would be done in a year. On completion of the score, in an interview with Deccan Chronicle he quoted, "Working for a performance capture film was a little difficult and composing the background scores and songs for it was a tedious process. We brought in about 150 orchestras and made every song unique." Chinmayi, in an interview, recollected the recording session of the song "Idhayam" during which she and A. R. Rahman were seated on the floor with Rahman playing the harmonium, and Chinmayi crooning the tune on an ordinary handheld mic. Rahman briefed his requirement of the song to her as "a train leaving the station that gradually picks up speed". She also mentioned that although the song was recorded inside the recording booth on a studio mic later on, the version she had recorded on the handheld mic was retained as the final version of the song.

Reported as "Ethirgal Illai" in 2012, the "sayings" in the philosophical theme song called "Maattram Ondrudhaan Maaraadhadhu" (translates to 'Change is only constant') were recited by Rajinikanth As per the director of the film, lyricist Vairamuthu and actor Rajinikanth worked on the song's lyrics for a week to avoid encountering any controversial lines. Further, as per latter's advice, couple of lines on women from the originally written lyrics were removed. This is the second time, that the actor took part in playback singing for a film after the song "Adikuthu Kuliru" in the (1992) film Mannan. Rajinikanth recited the sayings in the Hindi, the song sung by Javed Ali, for the Hindi version of the soundtrack. The lyrics were written by Irshad Kamil in Hindi and Urdu; entirely different from its Tamil counterpart. The track was recorded at AIR Studios, London on 31 March 2012. In August 2012, Sony Music Entertainment acquired the music rights of the film. In June 2013, Hollywood music engineer Geoff Foster was involved in mixing 200 tracks of orchestra for the soundtrack.

"Kochadaiiyaan was one of the toughest movies to score and mix for, due to the responsibility and role, music had in the narrative. We had to move forward on many sensibilities and step back for some others. We consciously stayed away from conventional massy numbers. With confidence in the script, we tried to stay true to dance numbers that were intrinsic to the setting of the movie and heighten the emotion."

— A. R. Rahman, on working for Kochadaiiyaan

On 20 December 2012, lyricist Vairamuthu unveiled the Tamil lyrics of the melancholic song "Idhayam" (introduced as "Senthee Vizhuntha Sempor Paarayil" in 2012) through his official Twitter account. In an interview with The Hindu, he stated that it contains 2,100-year-old Tamil words in pure form with dialects of the Sangam age, planking imagery and epithets in verses. The song puts forth anguish and longing emotions and was written in 90 minutes by the lyricist. The song "Mannapenin Sathiyam" revolves around a wedding situation in the film; talks about the promise of a husband to his wife and vice versa. The track "Karma Veeran" whose lyrics focus about struggles and victory feature at the film's beginning and ending respectively. In an interview with Thamarai Extra, singer S. P. Balasubrahmanyam deciphered about the duet song "Methuvaagathaan"—the only 'commercial song' in the period drama— with singer Sadhana Sargam. At the audio listening session of the soundtrack, lyricist Vairamuthu stated that he and Rahman had shortlisted the lyrics of songs from over hundred verses, relevant in today's times, not bounded by terms of usual style, structure or syntax.

== Marketing ==
The audio rights were acquired by Sony Music India in August 2012. On 6 March 2014 a preview event was organised by Sony Music India in Chennai to selected members of the press. Four songs from the film namely "Medhuvagathaan", "Manapennin Sathiyam", "Karma Veeran" and "Maattram Onnrudhaan Maaraathadhu" were played at the event. A day prior to the music launch, audio teasers of the songs were released on MediaOne Global Entertainment's official SoundCloud channel.

The video track of "Thaandav" from the motion picture was released on 25 April 2014 as well as an online contest titled "Rajini Thandav" was held. Video teaser of "Methuvaagathaan" was released on 21 May 2014.

== Release ==
The original version, along the Telugu one of the soundtrack was released at Sathyam Cinemas, Royapettah in Chennai on 9 March 2014. The audio launch invitations printed in China involved a one-fold invite with an imposing 3D image of Rajinikanth's character in the film. The event started with a devotional song, followed by a dance tribute to Rajinikanth. The Tamil and Hindi theatrical trailers were broadcast, followed by a footage of the 'making of the film'. The event was presided by actors, Rajinikanth, Shah Rukh Khan, Deepika Padukone, Nasser, Jackie Shroff; directors K. S. Ravikumar, K. Balachander, Soundarya Rajinikanth, S. Shankar; composer A. R. Rahman, Resul Pookutty; and lyricist Vairamuthu. The full TV telecast of the audio launch and trailer release function was telecast on 30 March 2014 on Jaya TV.

== Critical reception ==
=== Songs ===
The Tamil and Telugu versions of the soundtrack received generally positive reviews, while the Hindi version received mixed reviews. Music Aloud rated the album 9 on a scale of 10 asserting, "Easily one of the best soundtracks that A R Rahman has produced for the Superstar!"Behindwoods gave the verdict, "Mozart of Madras' show of magnificence and mastery." They also gave it 4 out of 5 stars. Indiaglitz noted, "Given that 'Kochadaiiyaan' is a graphic entertainer, this music will well suit the screenplay, and is also a soothing album independently." They rated the album 3.7 out of 5.

Srinivas Ramanujan for The Times of India wrote, "The music of Kochadaiiyaan is more Rahman than Rajini." He gave the album 3.5 out of 5. Joginder Tuteja who reviewed the Hindi version of the soundtrack at Rediff, assigned it 3 (out of 5). He noted, "The music of Kochadaiiyaan fits in with the kind of film it is. One can't expect the kind of soundtrack that had made Sivaji and Endhiran/Robot such massive musical hits, considering that this one isn't set in current times." Bodrul Chaudhury for Bollyspice stated that he was somewhat disappointed with the music to Kochadaiiyaan, lacking in the essences of a typical A. R. Rahman album. He added, "Though ‘Vaada Vaada’ (Female Version), ‘Mera Gham’ and ‘Aaya Khwaab Ka Mausam’ are the highlights of this album, the rest of the songs were not very intriguing to listen to. Overall, this was a strenuous album to listen to and won't have a strong impact!" Sakhayan Ghosh for The Indian Express writes, "A Hindi version can never substitute the ethos of the original – conceived in a language that dictates the way lyrics, music and phonetics come together. You feel the words are fitted into a skeleton, which in turn affects the way the singer sings it, and a lot is lost in translation. Kochadaiiyaan, which is crippled by the same problem." He gave the album a score of 2.5 out of 5. At Koimoi, awarding 3.5 stars (out of 5) the critic wrote, "The drama, Kochadaiiyaan, with its warfare nuances, correctly settled for a powerful theme for the entire music album. It is an album that sports two specific trends, battle cries and anthems alongside absolute Bollywood romance." Priya Adivarekar of India's The Financial Express commented that the Kochadaiiyaan album has "its share of highs and lows, but it is definitely worth a hear!". Further, she presented the summary of the album quoting, "Kochadaiiyaan is a far cry from what we have heard in films like Sivaji: The Boss and Endhiran (Robot). Songs for both the Hindi dubbed version and the Tamil film are well-composed by A. R. Rahman, keeping in mind the theme and era in which the film is set."

=== Background score ===
The background score of the film was immensely praised by the critics. Following the popularity and positive critical response to the score, on 27 May 2014, A. R. Rahman stated that the work on compiling the motion picture's score as an album was under progress.

Critic Taran Adarsh for Bollywood Hungama wrote, "The soundtrack by A.R. Rahman is seeped in originality, but the non-popularity of songs go against them. Having said that, the powerful background score complement the visuals on screen. M. Suganth of The Times of India said, "The energetic background score compensate for the blemishes in the film" Critic Komal Nahta through is official publishing summarized, "A.R. Rahman's music is melodious but not a single song has been popularised. Lyrics are okay." Critical review board of Behindwoods praised the score, "A.R.Rahman is among the main pillars bolstering Kochadaiiyaan and he even does the honors of introducing the movie's milieu and characters in the beginning. His background score is out of the world and the work on the orchestration and instrumentation is world class. All his songs have been given pride of place but a few of them do stick out and hamper the movie's pace, particularly 'Idhayam'." Critic at Sify praised the music director by writing that his songs and BGM elevates the film to a new high. At Deccan Chronicle, Thinkal Menon stated, "AR Rahman too delivers with a quite a vibrant, commercial score" Rachit Gupta at Filmfare summarized—"Excellently crafted music by AR Rahman in the exhilarating fights and vengeance drama" Critic Subhash K. Jha for Indo Asian News Service praised to score claiming, "Rahman is the film's biggest saving grace and it's his music and background score that breathes life into the film. The songs looked visually spectacular but their placement sometimes affected the film's narrative." At Koimoi, critic Manohar Basu gave a verdict, "A.R Rahman's background score as well as the film's music try to resurrect a lofty picture."Rajeev Masand for CNN-IBN felt, "A. R. Rahman's score is rousing."Raja Sen of Rediff said— When it is this loud, it cannot justly be called background score.

== Track listing ==
The track listing of the original and the Telugu version was unveiled through the record label's official Twitter handle on 5 March 2014. The soundtrack consists of nine tracks.

=== Original version ===
All lyrics are written by Vairamuthu, except where noted.

No.	Title	Singers	Length
1.	"Engae Pogudho Vaanam"	S. P. Balasubrahmanyam	4:53
2.	"Medhuvaagathaan" (Lyrics:Vaalee)	S. P. Balasubrahmanyam, Sadhana Sargam	5:09
3.	"Maattram Ondrudhaan Maaraadhadhu"	Rajinikanth, Haricharan, Jathi^{[a]} V. Umashankar	5:56
4.	"Manappenin Sathiyam"	Latha Rajinikanth	3:53
5.	"Idhayam"	Srinivas, Chinmayi	4:34
6.	"Engal Kochadaiiyaan"	Kochadaiiyaan Ensemble	3:59
7.	"Manamaganin Sathiyam"	Haricharan	3:47
8.	"Rana's Dream" (Instrumental)	The London Session Orchestra	4:05
9.	"Karma Veeran"	A. R. Rahman, A. R. Reihana	6:46

=== Hindi version ===
No.	Title	Lyrics	Singers	Length
1.	"Aaya Khwaab Ka Mausam"	Raqueeb Alam	Raghav Mathur	4:52
2.	"Dil Chaspiya"	Irshad Kamil	Arijit Singh, Jonita Gandhi	5:09
3.	"Bol De"	Irshad Kamil	Rajinikanth, Javed Ali	5:56
4.	"Vaada Vaada – Female"	Irshad Kamil	Shashaa Tirupathi	3:53
5.	"Mera Gham"	Irshad Kamil	Shreya Ghoshal, Javed Ali	4:33
6.	"Thandav"	Raqueeb Alam	Kochadaiiyaan Ensemble	3:59
7.	"Vaada Vaada – Male"	Irshad Kamil	Karthik	3:47
8.	"Rana's Dream" (Instrumental)		The London Session Orchestra	4:05
9.	"Aye Jawaan"	Mehboob	A. R. Rahman, A. R. Reihana	6:45

=== Telugu version ===
No.	Title	Lyrics	Singers	Length
1.	"Choodham Aakasam Antham"	Chandrabose	S. P. Balasubrahmanyam	04:53
2.	"Manasaayera"	Vanamali	S. P. Balasubrahmanyam, Sadhana Sargam	05:09
3.	"Yentho Nijame"	Chandrabose	Mano, Hemachandra	05:56
4.	"Yedemaina Sakha"	Anantha Sreeram	Latha Rajinikanth	03:53
5.	"Hridhayam"	Vanamali	Mano, Chinmayi	04:34
6.	"Vikramasimhudive"	Chandrabose	Vikramasimha Ensemble	03:59
7.	"Yedemaina Sakhi"	Ananta Sriram	Unnikrishnan	03:47
8.	"Rana's Dream" (Instrumental)		The London Session Orchestra	04:05
9.	"Karma Veerudu"	Vanamali	A. R. Rahman, A. R. Reihana	06:46

Notes

- ^{^a} Jathi is a term in carnatic music that signifies the beat count of the rhythm cycle. It specifically applies to lagu component(s) of the tālam and not necessarily to the entire tālam. The different jathis are tisra (three beats in lagu), chathusra (four), khanda (five), misra (seven) and sankeerna (nine).

== Chart performance ==
The track "Engae Pogudho Vaanam", sung by S. P. Balasubrahmanyam was released on 7 October 2013 as a single, along with its Telugu version "Choodham Aakasam Antham" to positive response; it was first aired on Radio Mirchi in Chennai the same day. Upon the soundtrack album's release on 9 March 2014, it became the first Tamil film music album to trend on Twitter and top the iTunes India charts as well as made its debut on position #3 at the Sri Lankan iTunes charts.

Charts	Song title	Peak position	Reference
Radio Mirchi South	Engae Pogudho Vaanam	9	
Radio Mirchi South	Methuvaagathaan	2	
Radio Mirchi South	Maattram Ondrudhaan Maaraadhadhu	2	
Times of India – Tamil	Engae Pogudho Vaanam	9	
Times of India – Tamil	Methuvaagathaan	4	
Times of India – Tamil	Maattram Ondrudhaan Maaraadhadhu	2	
iTunes India (Tamil)	Engae Pogutho Vaanam	1	
iTunes India (Tamil)	Methuvaagathaan	1	
iTunes India (Tamil)	Maattram Ondrudhaan Maaraadhadhu	1	
Nokia MixRadio – Tamil Top Charts	Idhayam	1	
Nokia MixRadio – Tamil Top Charts	Methuvaagathaan	1	
Nokia MixRadio – Tamil Top Charts	Engae Pogudho Vaanam	1	
Nokia MixRadio – Tamil Top Charts	Maattram Ondrudhaan Maaraadhadhu	1	
BBC Radio India	Dil Chaspiya; Maattram Ondrudhaan Maaraadhadhu; Engae Pogudho Vaanam; Methuvaagathaan		
BBC Radio India	Dil Chaspiya; Maattram Ondrudhaan Maaraadhadhu; Engae Pogudho Vaanam; Methuvaagathaan	Ranked in 'A' playlist	

== Audio credits ==
Credits adapted from original CD liner notes.

Backing vocals

Dr. Narayanan, Nivas, Vijay Narayanan, Anand, Varun, Santosh Hariharan, Abhay Jodhpurkar, Deepak, Bhagyaraj, Parag Pooja, Malavika, Sowmya Mahadevan, Sharanya, Raagini, Veena, Gayathri

Personnel

- Indian Rhythm & Percussion – Satyanarayan, Raja, Vedachalam, Neelakantan, Lakshminarayanan, Kumar, Srinivas, Prasad
- Flute – Kiran, Naveen Iyer
- Dilruba – Saroja
- Sitar – Jarnarthan
- Veena – Devi
- Harp – Cheenu
- Shehnai – Balesh
- Trumpet – Babu
- Guitar – Prasanna
- Bass guitar – Mohini
- Timpani – Yash Pathak

=== Production ===
- Producer: A. R. Rahman
- Sound Design: Resul Pookutty
- Mastering: Louie Teran at Marcussen Mastering Studios, Los Angeles
- Recording & Mixing: Geoff Foster at the London Session Orchestra ("Engae Pogudo Vaanam", "Maatram Ondruthaan", "Rana's Dream")
- Engineers:
  - Suresh Permal, T. R. Krishna Chetan, Jerry Vincent, Srinidhi Venkatesh, Santhosh Dhayanithi (Panchathan Record Inn, Chennai)
  - S. Sivakumar, Kannan Ganpat, Pradeep, Karthik Sekaran, Krishnan Subramaniam (AM Studios, Chennai)
  - ND Santhosh, Finny Kurian (KM College of Music & Music Technology, Chennai)
  - Tony Joy, Kevin Doucette (Panchathan Hollywood Studios, Los Angeles)
- Vocal supervision: Srinivas, Srinidhi Venkatesh, V.J. Srinivasamurthy, Dr. Narayan, Srinidhi Venkatesh
- Music supervisor: Srinidhi Venkatesh
- Project Supervisor: Suresh Permal
- Chennai Strings Orchestra: V.J. Srinivasamurthy (AM Studios, Chennai)
- Additional Orchestral Arrangements: Hentry Kuruvilla
- Mixing: Geoff Foster, T. R. Krishna Chetan, Tony Joy
- Additional Programming: Jerry Vincent, T.R. Krishna Chetan, Hentry Kuruvilla, Marc, Ishaan Chhabra, Santhosh Dhayanithi
- Music co-ordinator: Noell James, Vijay Mohan Iyer
- Musicians' fixer: R. Samidurai
