= Highway (2014 Hindi film) =

2014 Indian film by Imtiaz Ali

- Theatrical release poster
- Directed by: Imtiaz Ali
- Written by: Imtiaz Ali
- Produced by: Sajid Nadiadwala; Imtiaz Ali
- Starring: Alia Bhatt; Randeep Hooda
- Cinematography: Anil Mehta
- Edited by: Aarti Bajaj
- Music by: A. R. Rahman
- Production companies: Window Seat Films; Nadiadwala Grandson Entertainment
- Distributed by: UTV Motion Pictures
- Release dates: 13 February 2014 (Berlin); 20 February 2014 (UAE); 21 February 2014 (Worldwide)
- Running time: 133 minutes
- Country: India
- Language: Hindi
- Budget: ₹25 crore
- Box office: ₹50 crore

Highway is a 2014 Indian Hindi-language road drama film written and directed by Imtiaz Ali and produced by Sajid Nadiadwala. The film stars Alia Bhatt and Randeep Hooda. Screened in the Panorama section of the 2014 Berlin International Film Festival, the film was released worldwide on 21 February 2014. The film is based on the episode of the same name from the Zee TV anthology series Rishtey, starring Aditya Srivastava and Kartika Rane, which was also written and directed by Imtiaz Ali. It tells the story of a young woman who discovers freedom after being kidnapped.

Upon release, Highway received positive reviews from critics, with high praise directed towards Bhatt and Hooda's performance, thus proving to be a breakthrough for the former. It also emerged as a moderate commercial success at the box office.

At the 60th Filmfare Awards, Highway received 9 nominations, including Best Actress (Bhatt) and Best Story (Ali), and won Best Actress (Critics) (Bhatt).

== Plot ==
Veera Tripathi is the sheltered daughter of Manik Kumar Tripathi, a rich Delhi-based business tycoon. One day before her wedding, she goes on a drive with Vinay, her fiancé whom she does not love, and is abducted from a petrol station off a highway while Vinay sits in the car convulsed with fear. The abductors start to panic when they find out her father has links to the government. However, Mahabir Bhati, one of the assertive abductors, is willing to do whatever it takes to see it through.

The men continuously move Veera through different cities to avoid being tracked by police. Initially, Mahabir wants to get ransom for Veera and then sell her off to a brothel. Eventually, when the police forcefully search the truck, Veera hides, much to her own surprise. She concludes she loves the journey and does not want to return to her family. As the days pass, Veera finds peace and newfound freedom, confusing and frustrating Mahabir. Veera becomes comfortable with her captors and even confides in Mahabir that she was sexually abused by her uncle as a nine-year-old multiple times. She views the abduction as a blessing in disguise since she finally has the chance to experience life and find herself. Yet Mahabir, avoiding his feelings, is persistent to shove Veera into prostitution after receiving ransom. Slowly, she unravels Mahabir's story and learns his father continually abused both him when he was a young child and his mother, who was used as a sex slave by rich landlords. Mahabir escaped and never returned.

Mahabir slowly lets down his guard and begins to care for Veera, and his anger fades away. He tries to leave her at a police station in a small mountainous town they stop by. However, Veera refuses and insists on staying with Mahabir. They travel together, and he starts to fall in love with her. They stay in a hilltop house and Veera reveals having a small home in the mountains was one of her many dreams. Mahabir becomes emotional seeing how Veera cares for him, reminding him of his mother. Both sleep peacefully that night, free from their respective haunting pasts. The next morning, the police arrive and shoot Mahabir, to which Veera reacts strongly. It is later revealed Mahabir had died on the spot.

Veera is later brought back to her parents' house, where she recovers from the emotionally draining experience while surrounded by her family members, including Vinay. Finally gaining strength, she confronts her uncle, who molested her as a child, in front of her family. She yells and breaks down as she asks her father why he warned her about dangers posed by outsiders while the real threat was from insiders, the people who had surrounded her since childhood. She leaves the house and goes to live in the mountains, where she starts her own factory and buys her own house. Feeling content, she closes her eyes and envisions her nine-year-old self playing happily on the hillside with a young Mahabir, making peace with the man she loved and their mutual childhood forms.

== Cast ==
- Alia Bhatt as Veera Tripathi
  - Samar Mudasir Bakshi as young Veera
- Randeep Hooda as Mahabir Bhati
  - Mohd. Kaif as young Mahabir
- Arjun Malhotra as Vinay
- Saharsh Kumar Shukla as Goru
- Pradeep Nagar as Tonk
- Durgesh Kumar as Aadoo
- Hemant Mahaur as Kasana
- Reuben Israel as Manik Kumar Tripathi, Veera's father
- Naina Trivedi as Amma

== Production ==
=== Development ===
In an interview with The Telegraph, director Imtiaz Ali asserted, "Highway has been a story that has stayed with me for 15 years. There was something in it that didn't die. Usually you lose interest in a story beyond a certain point. But with Highway, there was something very subtle, yet something very influential". On the story he added, "Some years ago, I made a half-hour episode for a TV series (in 1999 for Zee TV's Rishtey starring Aditya Srivastava and Kartika Rane) and that's where I first got a hint for this story. And over time, it changed form and genres until I just gave up. And then it all settled down to this journey of two characters. As for the central female lead, I thought I would cast someone with some experience of life, someone who had probably been through some relationships. While penning the script he stated he had to change many scenes of the film because he felt they were becoming too similar to his previous film, Jab We Met (2007). He said that the film was his first digital film. The director initially envisioned casting an older actress, possibly someone like Aishwarya Rai, who he believed would be ideal for the role of Veera without makeup. However, after meeting Alia Bhatt, he did not consider anyone else for the part. In the April 2013 interview with the same, he said the film is primarily the story of two characters from very different backgrounds—played by Alia Bhatt and Randeep Hooda—who take the road trip across six states in a truck. Further, Ali told that he had thought of making Highway in various ways. At an instant he thought of making it a very big action film later he thought of scripting it in a very romantic way; some 12 years back, he drew romantic instances from Qayamat Se Qayamat Tak (1988). He added, "The film is about the discovery of yourself while traveling. It's a coming-of-age film." Prior to shooting he didn't complete scripting for the film and the script got ready after the shooting of the scenes because the dialogues were decided on the spot. Over the improvisations in script, he stated, "For instance, when we were on the top of snow mountains in Himachal Pradesh, I wanted to be open to what nature suggested and the impulses the actors gave me, rather than stick to what I had written, sitting in a room in Mumbai. The film was made on the way, on the go. I had to have very suitable, good actors and a low maintenance crew." For Highway, Hooda prepared for his role with such sincerity that in order to keep the initial distance with Bhatt's character, he didn't speak to her for about 25 days.

=== Casting ===
Ali said that earlier he was looking out for an older actress to match up with Hooda. However, the role went to Alia Bhatt that made effect on his film script. Later he added, "I needed somebody who is city slick girl (Alia Bhatt), who has never been out. But the guy (Randeep Hooda) had to be somebody who has had a life and understanding of life". About Hooda's character, Ali stated, "Mahabir is also pure enough not to be a prototypical villain. Only later in the film, certain things are revealed about him, why he's an oppressor." Besides the main casting Imtiaz Ali and Mukesh Chhabra cast Pradeep Nagar as one of the main henchman of Randeep.

=== Crew ===
As per previous collaboration of Ali with the composer A. R. Rahman, the latter's inclusion in the project though initially rumored was confirmed by March 2013. In an interview with The Telegraph Ali stated that he wasn't even thinking of A. R. Rahman to score for this film. However, after reading the script Rahman agreed to score. In yet another interview Ali stated, he and Rahman were in touch through Skype and Rahman enquired about Ali's new project and wanted to collaborate after Ali deciphered the outline of the story. The film is produced by Sajid Nadiadwala under his production house and Imtiaz Ali is the co-producer. The cinematography was done by Anil Mehta. Resul Pookutty was roped in for the film's sound design. Lyricist Irshad Kamil has penned the songs.

=== Filming ===
Principal photography began in early March 2013 on highways of India. Imtiaz Ali quoted, "Highway is emotionally charged, physically strenuous". The first look as a snap at the filming location featuring the director and the lead actors was released in March 2013. Initially, the director planned to shoot along Bengal-Bihar-Odisha highway road belt but later opted to shoot along the road highways of Delhi, Haryana, Rajasthan, Punjab, Himachal Pradesh and Kashmir, making the film first of its kind to shoot such. Scenes were shot in Kuchaman valley where the sand dunes provided the terrain transitions that were necessarily required. In mid-April 2013, the crew was off to Gurais, Kashmir to shoot a song and some sequences in the valley. Scenes in Aru valley and Chandanwari near Pahalgam in South Kashmir were also canned. By early May 2013, nearly seventy percent of the filming was completed. Although the entire shooting was planned for 60 days, the team finished in 52 days. On filming scenes, in an interview with The Hollywood Reporter, Ali stated, "I also didn't go for a large camera setup such as cranes and dollies. I wanted the cameras to be easily transported as we were shooting in difficult locations such as on mountains. So if I thought the shot would look better from a higher angle, we could move the equipment faster than if we had a heavy setup." Officially, the shooting was wrapped up on 28 May 2013.

=== Plagiarism allegations ===
Following the film's release, similarities were noted with the 1994 American film The Chase, an American action-comedy starring Charlie Sheen and centering on a wealthy young woman abducted by a fugitive, leading to allegations of plagiarism from both critics and audience. However, after comparing both films, film critic Baradwaj Rangan, while noting similarities, including the circumstances of the abduction, concluded that they were insufficient to characterize Highway as plagiarism, suggesting that The Chase could at most have served as an "inspiration."

== Music ==
The film soundtrack album is composed by A. R. Rahman. The album contains nine original songs with lyrics of eight tracks penned by Irshad Kamil and remaining one by Lady Kash and Krissy. Initially, the film was planned with only background score and no songs. The track "Maahi Ve" sung by A. R. Rahman and "Patakha Guddi (Female)" sung by Nooran sisters (Jyoti & Sultana Nooran), both these singles framed the score of the theatrical trailer, These tracks clenched second position on iTunes India single charts on their respective release dates as singles. The complete soundtrack album had a digital release on 7 February 2014. It debuted on number one position on iTunes India and "Maahi Ve" was the chart topping single.

== Marketing ==
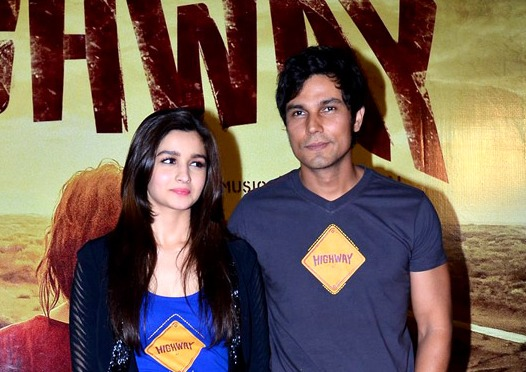
Alia Bhatt and Randeep Hooda at the first look launch of Highway

Marketing began from November 2013 wherein series of behind the scenes footages as episodes titled under the head "Highway Diaries" were released on Bollywood Hungama's production blog.

The film's merchandise, headgear, jackets, map scarfs, bags and shirts, all with fabric prints of title logo, were made available for online purchase. On 30 January 2014, Alia Bhatt promoted the film on the sets of Dance India Dance. On 13 February 2014, Hooda, Bhatt, Ali, Rahman and the director of Disney UTV made an appearance at Cineworld in Feltham to promote the film as well for its first International premiere at the 64th Berlin International Film Festival. Ali and Alia Bhatt promoted the film at an event in Taj West End, Bengaluru. The leading duo and Imtiaz Ali appeared on the show Comedy Nights with Kapil to promote the film. Actor Ranbir Kapoor had seen an early cut of the film. He arrived at the Film City studios where he, Imtiaz Ali and Alia Bhatt moved around in the truck and had a talk about the film. This activity of promotion was filmed for the news channel Times Now.

== Release ==
Initially set to release on 12 December 2013, the film's release date was moved to 21 February 2014. The trailer of the film was released on 16 December 2013. On 20 February 2014, a day prior to the film's release, the film had a special screening that was attended by Pooja Bhatt, Mahesh Bhatt, Imtiaz Ali, Shazahn Padamsee, Mukesh Bhatt, Bhushan Kumar, and Rekha at the PVR Cinemas in Mumbai. Apart from the guest invitees, critics were specially invited for the film's screening.

== Reception ==
=== India ===
Critic Srijana Mitra Das for The Times of India gave the film 3.5 stars out of 5 and stated, "Highway is not an easy ride, but it offers fresh breezes and new sights." For Mumbai Mirror, Rahul Desai wrote, "Highway makes for the kind of cinema we need, perhaps not something we entirely deserve. Even if you aren't moved by its unhurried simplicity, or do not agree with this review, I challenge you to resist an overwhelming urge to rush out after dark hoping to get kidnapped (or simpler, just take off) to the foothills of the Himalayas. In that itself, is the battle won by a film that strives for little more." He gave the film 4 out of 5. Critic Sonia Chopra for Sify gave 4 on 5 and said, "Maybe there's no need to intellectualize this beautiful bond and just savour it as it is. Just like the film. Do not miss!" Assigning no rating yet positive critical review, at One India, Venkatesh Prasad stated, "Highway will be a special experience for you, especially if you like road movies. Film has some valid points about life in general. Watch it and you won't regret your decision." Saibal Chatterjee for NDTV gave the film 3 out of 5 and wrote, "Highway is a must watch as much for what it is as for what it isn't. It is not a typical romantic drama, nor an average love story. It is a road movie with a difference. Parmita Uniyal for Hindustan Times writes, "If you are stuck on the crossroads of life, take the Highway." The critic described the performance as, "Bhatt is still a 'student' in Bollywood, but can give a lesson or two to many. A natural performer, she nails it in a couple of scenes", whereas for Hooda she wrote, " He delivers a nuanced yet controlled performance. He perfects the Haryanvi accent to lend authenticity to his character. He's able to get into the skin of his character Mahabir Bhati. His character opens up and frees himself from the self-imposed shackles towards the end."

For Rediff, Aseem Chhabra after viewing the film in Berlin quoted, "It is rare that a Hindi language film delivers so much promise in the first half. And so it is extremely disappointing when the director and his script lead us on a journey that eventually fizzles out, collapses and dies in front of our eyes." He gave the film 2 stars out of 5. According to movie critic RJ Akki for FireMud FM , "Bhatt breaks her image from Student of the Year (2012) and mesmerizes through her role in the film. Hooda is expressionless till the interval, but still his acting is commendable. Ali has proved himself an all-rounder. To conclude, RJ Akki gave the film 3 stars out of 5. Manohar Basu at Koimoi stated, "Highway whips up all the ingredients required for an intriguing film but goes wrong as a whole. It is bold subject handled flimsily and doesn't come close to believable. There is excessive heavy handedness in the screenplay and somehow the effortless ease that signifies the beauty of Imtiaz's films is absolutely missing from it. There is far too much of incoherence in the screenplay to bear and though it tried its hand at adding varied hues to multiple layers of the story, one cannot disagree to the fact that it is only Rahman's divine music and the pristine cinematography that works here. The film is heart-breakingly mediocre. It is a lenient 2.5/5 for Highway" Shubhra Gupta for The Indian Express gave the film 2 out of 5 stars, stated that "Highway is pretty but stagey, Alia Bhatt falters in many places". Deepanjali Pal for Firstpost writes, "A journey with Alia Bhatt and many road bumps." According to critic Gayatri Sankar for Zee News, "Highway emerges as a clear winner. It is not meant for movie goers who enter the theatre hoping to see some bizarre fight sequences, masaledar drama, naach-gaana or intense love-making scenes. Nonetheless, if you are looking forward to seeing a really hatke love story then Highway is your destination." She gave the film 3.5 stars out of 5.

=== Overseas ===
Priya Joshi of Digital Spy gave it 4 (out of 5) stars: "It's exemplary filmmaking, and the hope is that audiences will take a detour from the confines of commercial Bollywood and embrace this wholly edifying experience. Highway' will move you in ways you would have never expected." Sneha May Francis for Emirates 24/7 wrote, "Barring a sluggish narrative and a few continuity slip-ups, Imitiaz’s movie promises remarkable performances. Highway is a road less traveled, and one that we think you must embark on. It's a bumpy ride, no doubt, but one that's set in the right direction." Deborah Young for The Hollywood Reporter stated that "Soul-lifting visuals and a score by A. R. Rahman help, but can't save, a pat drama." Viji Alles for UKAsian wrote, "a road-trip movie that not only gives a triumphant two-fingered salute to many films of the genre but to Bollywood convention as well." Rachel Saltz for The New York Times putforth, "Mr. Ali’s story, though, wanders too long and too far, sometimes coming off like a forced mash-up of It Happened One Night (1934) and Patty Hearst (1988). No wonder the film can't sustain a tone, wavering between realism and Bollywood hokum." Assigning the film 3.5 out of 5 stars, critic Manjusha Radhakrishnan for Gulf News stated, "It's gritty in parts and unrealistic in some (which hostage would break out into a hip-hop dance on wasteland). But watch this one for Bhatt and Hooda. They are at their vulnerable, rugged best. Plus, if you are in the mood to see India in its raw, unpolished state, Highway can be an exhilarating ride." Critic Zachary Wigon for The Village Voice commented, "Imtiaz Ali's Highway is nothing if not erratic in its narrative delivery — though its fascinating thematic concern remains fixed throughout." He summarized the film - 'Indian 1 Percenter Kidnapped! Then She Falls in Love! It's Bollywood..'" Ronnie Scheib for Variety said, "Life is literally a highway for kidnapper and victim in this engaging and atypical improvised Bollywood road dilm." At critic Roger Joseph Ebert's website where the film receives 2.5 stars (out of 4) critic-cum-journalist Danny Bowes wrote, "Highway might be a very good movie indeed. Instead, it's an inconsistent, if intermittently splendorous, work. There are, to be perfectly clear, far worse things in life."

=== Box office ===
India

The film was released on over 700 screens across India; mostly in multiplexes. It started slowly with occupancy of 20–25% at the theatres but later gained momentum during evening in multiplexes in metropolitan cities like Delhi, Mumbai, Gurgaon, and Bangalore collecting ₹32.5 million (US$340,000)–₹35 million (US$360,000). Second day collections were around ₹40 million (US$420,000)–₹42.5 million (US$440,000) with growth in circuit's like Delhi NCR, East Punjab, Rajasthan and CI. On the fourth day post its release, the film grossed around ₹25 million (US$260,000) nett taking the overall four-day total to ₹155 million (US$1.6 million). The complete one week collections after the release accounted for ₹217.5 million (US$2.3 million). On the eighth day, the film dropped its collections, grossing around ₹0.75 million (US$7,800) nett. The total business in eight days was around ₹225 million (US$2.3 million) nett. The film dropped in its second week as it collected ₹50 million (US$520,000)-₹52.5 million (US$550,000) nett in its second weekend taking its two-week gross to around ₹226 million (US$2.3 million) nett.

Overseas

The film collected Rs 1.78 crores nett ($286,495) from 81 screens in the US, Rs 24.22 lakhs ($39,027) from 12 screens in Canada, Rs 1.49 crores (AED 881,500) in the UAE and Rs 1.10 crore (£106,581) from 49 screens in the UK Box Office in the first weekend. the performance of Highway is not up to the mark in other foreign countries like Australia and New Zealand. The film has raked in Rs 22.51 lakhs (A$40,391) from 13 screens in Australia and Rs 5.15 lakhs (NZ$10,020) from 6 screens in the New Zealand Box office in the first weekend. which released in around 250 screens in the international markets, has approximately collected Rs 5.58 crores ($900,000) at the Overseas Box Office in the first weekend.

== Accolades ==
Note – The lists are ordered by the date of announcement, not necessarily by the date of ceremony/telecast.

Positive awards and nominations
Distributor	Date announced	Category	Recipient	Result	Reference
Stardust Awards	15 December 2014	Best Director (Searchlight Awards)	Imtiaz Ali	Won	
Stardust Awards	15 December 2014	Best Actor (Searchlight Awards)	Randeep Hooda	Won	
Stardust Awards	15 December 2014	Superstar of Tomorrow (Female)	Alia Bhatt	Won	
Stardust Awards	15 December 2014	Best Actress (Searchlight Awards)	Alia Bhatt	Nominated	
Stardust Awards	15 December 2014	Best Female Playback Singer	Jyoti & Sultana Nooran (for "Patakha Guddi")	Nominated	
Stardust Awards	15 December 2014	Best Music Director	A. R. Rahman	Nominated	
Stardust Awards	15 December 2014	Best Actress in a Drama	Alia Bhatt	Nominated	
Stardust Awards	15 December 2014	Best Actor in a Drama	Randeep Hooda	Nominated	
BIG Star Entertainment Awards	19 December 2014	Most Entertaining Film	Imtiaz Ali, Sajid Nadiadwala	Nominated	
BIG Star Entertainment Awards	19 December 2014	Most Entertaining Social - Drama Film	Imtiaz Ali, Sajid Nadiadwala	Nominated	
BIG Star Entertainment Awards	19 December 2014	Most Entertaining Romantic Film	Imtiaz Ali, Sajid Nadiadwala	Nominated	
BIG Star Entertainment Awards	19 December 2014	Most Entertaining Actor in a Social - Drama Film - Female	Alia Bhatt	Nominated	
BIG Star Entertainment Awards	19 December 2014	Most Entertaining Actor in a Social - Drama Film - Male	Randeep Hooda	Nominated	
BIG Star Entertainment Awards	19 December 2014	Most Entertaining Song	A. R. Rahman (for "Maahi Ve")	Nominated	
Star Guild Awards	12 January 2015	The Guild Presidents Award	Highway	Won	
Star Guild Awards	12 January 2015	Best Director	Imtiaz Ali	Nominated	
Star Guild Awards	12 January 2015	Best Actress in a Leading Role	Alia Bhatt	Nominated	
Star Guild Awards	12 January 2015	Best Actor in a Leading Role	Randeep Hooda	Nominated	
Star Guild Awards	12 January 2015	Best Female Playback Singer	Sultana & Jyoti Nooran (for "Patakha Guddi")	Nominated	
Star Guild Awards	12 January 2015	Best Lyricist	Irshad Kamil (for "Patakha Guddi")	Nominated	
Star Guild Awards	12 January 2015	Best Music Director (with track name)	A. R. Rahman (for "Patakha Guddi")	Nominated	
Star Guild Awards	12 January 2015	Best Story	Imtiaz Ali	Nominated	
Star Guild Awards	12 January 2015	Best Screenplay	Imtiaz Ali	Nominated	
Star Guild Awards	12 January 2015	Best Dialogue	Imtiaz Ali	Nominated	
Screen Awards	15 January 2015	Best Female Playback Singer	Sultana & Jyoti Nooran (for "Patakha Guddi")	Won	
Screen Awards	15 January 2015	Best Director	Imtiaz Ali	Nominated	
Screen Awards	15 January 2015	Best Actor (Female)	Alia Bhatt	Nominated	
Screen Awards	15 January 2015	Best Actor (Male)	Randeep Hooda	Nominated	
Screen Awards	15 January 2015	Best Music	A. R. Rahman	Nominated	
Screen Awards	15 January 2015	Best Background Score	A. R. Rahman	Nominated	
Screen Awards	15 January 2015	Best Lyricist	Irshad Kamil (for "Patakha Guddi")	Nominated	
Screen Awards	15 January 2015	Best Editing	Aarti Bajaj	Nominated	
Filmfare Awards	31 January 2015	Best Actress (Critics)	Alia Bhatt	Won	
Filmfare Awards	31 January 2015	Best Lyricist	Irshad Kamil (for "Patakha Guddi")	Nominated	
Filmfare Awards	31 January 2015	Best Female Playback Singer	Jyoti Nooran, Sultana Nooran (for "Patakha Guddi")	Nominated	
Filmfare Awards	31 January 2015	Best Story	Imtiaz Ali	Nominated	
Filmfare Awards	31 January 2015	Best Editing	Aarti Bajaj	Nominated	
Filmfare Awards	31 January 2015	Best Cinematography	Anil Mehta	Nominated	
Filmfare Awards	31 January 2015	Best Background Score	A. R. Rahman	Nominated	
Global Indian Music Academy (GiMA) Awards	25 February 2015	Best Film Album	A. R. Rahman	Won	
Global Indian Music Academy (GiMA) Awards	25 February 2015	Best Music Arranger & Programmer	A. R. Rahman (for "Maahi Ve")	Nominated	
Global Indian Music Academy (GiMA) Awards	25 February 2015	Best Background Score	A. R. Rahman	Nominated	
Global Indian Music Academy (GiMA) Awards	25 February 2015	Best Music Director	A. R. Rahman	Nominated	
Global Indian Music Academy (GiMA) Awards	25 February 2015	Best Music Debut	Jyoti & Sultana Nooran (for "Patakha Guddi")	Nominated	
Global Indian Music Academy (GiMA) Awards	25 February 2015	Best Female Playback Singer	Jyoti & Sultana Nooran (for "Patakha Guddi")	Nominated	
Mirchi Music Awards	26 February 2015	Female Vocalist of The Year	Nooran Sisters (for "Patakha Guddi")	Won	
Mirchi Music Awards	26 February 2015	Upcoming Female Vocalist of The Year	Nooran Sisters (for "Patakha Guddi")	Won	
Mirchi Music Awards	26 February 2015	Best Background Score	A. R. Rahman	Nominated	
PTC Punjabi Music Awards	21 April 2015	Best Punjabi Song Based in a Hindi Film	Jyoti & Sultana Nooran (for "Patakha Guddi")	Won	
