= Raanjhanaa (soundtrack) =

2013 soundtrack album by A. R. Rahman

- Soundtrack album cover

Soundtrack album by A. R. Rahman
- Released: 11 June 2013
- Recorded: June 2012 – April 2013; Panchathan Record Inn and AM Studios, Chennai; Panchathan Hollywood Studios, Los Angeles
- Genre: Feature film soundtrack
- Length: 38:12
- Language: Hindi
- Labels: Sony Music India; Eros Music
- Producer: A. R. Rahman

A. R. Rahman chronology
Maryan (2013)	Raanjhanaa (2013)	Highway (2014)

Singles from Raanjhanaa
- 1. "Tum Tak" Released: 24 May 2013; 2. "Raanjhanaa" Released: 27 May 2013

Raanjhanaa is the soundtrack album, composed by A. R. Rahman of the 2013 Hindi film of the same name, directed by Anand L. Rai and starring Dhanush, Sonam Kapoor and Abhay Deol in the lead roles. The film is produced by Krishika Lulla under the banner Eros International. The lyrics of the original version were written by Irshad Kamil whereas the Tamil version's lyrics were written by the lyricist Vairamuthu. The soundtrack album features nine original tracks. The music of the original version of the soundtrack was released on the co-branded record labels Sony Music India and Eros Music on 11 June 2013 and the Tamil version on 24 June 2013.

== Development ==
In June 2012, A. R. Rahman was signed on to compose songs and the background score. He agreed to compose after the script was re-written entirely in English by Rai and the former kept the script personally. The composition of the song "Banarasiya" was ready by September 2012 but was not recorded with a singer as Rai felt that no vocals matched with Sonam Kapoor's voice. Rai attributed the melody and beauty of the particular song to "Mujhe Kuch Kehna Hai" from the 1973 film Bobby. In an interview with Hindustan Times, Rahman stated that he had emphasized the folk-classical genre as the film brings out a fascination for Benaras through the music and most of the songs are character-driven. The composer stated that he had used the sounds of shehnai in almost every song, thereby paying a tribute to Ustad Bismillah Khan. The song 'Ay Sakhi' features Chinmayi mimicking the sound of a Shenai with her voice in the interlude portions. Whilst doing reconnaissance for the film, Rai recorded the live aarti chants for the score, however, the patch recordings were fit into a complete song titled "The Land of Shiva". Six songs were recorded by 23 November 2012. The soundtrack album composition was completed by early March 2013. The audio rights were acquired for a sum of ₹60 million (US$620,000).

The song "Tum Tak" was called a blend of romantic and spiritual elements. The track details the passage of five years through five festivals. "Tu Mun Shudi" is a contemporary track sung by Rabbi Shergill and the composer himself. The song was claimed equal parts rustic (Kundan, played by Dhanush) and urbane (Jasjeet Singh Shergill/Akram, played by Abhay Deol) based on the characters. Both the youth oriented songs "Humka Issaq Hua Hai" from the 1983 film Coolie and "Saamne Ye Kaun Aaya" from 1972 film Jawani Diwani were used in the background score of the film. Also the song "Saason Ki Zaroorat Hai Jaise" from 1989 film Aashiqui was used in the background in the very beginning and in the end of the film to show the importance of love in life.

The track "Tum Tak" was released as a promotional single on 6 May 2013. The title track sung by Jasvinder Singh and Shiraz Uppal was released as a promotional video on 16 May 2013. The third promotional track "Tu Mun Shudi" sung by A. R. Rahman and Rabbi Shergill was released on 30 May 2013. The song features Sonam Kapoor, Dhanush and Abhay Deol. Furthermore, the tracks "Banarasiya" and "Piya Milenge" were released in June 2013 as video promotionals.

"After Lagaan, this is the first time I got to work on folk-classical music. The film brings out a fascination for Benaras through the music. I'd rather call it a hybrid, but I guess you could call it that as well. It's got a bit of folk and classical elements and most of it is really character driven. Raanjhana's music is rustic and urbane."

— —A.R. Rahman on the music of Raanjhanaa.

== Reception ==
=== Critical reception ===
The soundtrack received positive critical reception.

Bryan Durham of The Times of India gave the album 4 out of 5 and summarized, "In totality, it also needs to be said that if Rahman's music is the language of this film, it would be quite short on a vocabulary without Irshad Kamil's beautiful lyrics." Jyoti Prakash of Indian Box Office Online also gave it 4.5 out of 5 stars and said, "The music of Raanjhanaa is of supreme quality. A typical AR Rahman album which is romantic and entertaining yet pure and divine." Music Aloud critic Vipin assigned the soundtrack 8 out of 10 and noted, "A mixed bag from ARR that is more urbane than folk-classical." Kaushik Ramesh of Planet Bollywood gave the album 7/10. Calling it very experimental, he said, "Be it the innovative vocal shehnai of 'Ay Sakhi' or Rabbi's attitude laden 'Tu Mun Shudi', the entire album presents immense freshness." Rumnique Nannar of Bollyspice gave the album 4.5/5 stars and wrote, "Raanjhanaa is a brilliant return to form and originality for A. R. Rahman, who proves his detractors wrong with an album that captures the energy of its city and its lovestruck Raanjhana. The songs may just take time to grow on the listener, but that's the joy in it, to savour all of the arrangements and voices that add up to a terrific and rustic album for the ages." Sakhayan Ghosh of The Indian Express summarized, "Irshad Kamil's lyrics provide a perfect foil to the music. And this is Rahman's finest turn since Rockstar, seeing the maestro enter exciting new musical territories." He gave the album 4 out of 5. Joginder Tuteja at Movie Talkies claimed, "There were good expectations from the music of Raanjhanaa and they are pretty much met (and at places even exceeded) with A. R. Rahman, Irshad Kamil and their singers coming together well to meet the shared vision that was spearheaded by the makers." He gave the album 3.5 out of 5 and added that the music "works quite well as a packaged affair". IANS gave it 3.5 out of 5 stars and observed, "Like any other album, the music of Raanjhanaa has few low points, but otherwise it is thoroughly entertaining." At Koimoi, critic Manohar Basu rated the album 3 on 5 and noted, "Very unlikely to be a Rahman composition, the music yet again lacks a soul stirring capability which made him a maverick once! Technically it is both brilliant and fine but the midas touch of the musician is strikingly missing." The critics review board at Behindwoods called it a "joyous wonder from Rahman" and gave it 3.5 out of 5.

=== Chart performance ===
The soundtrack peaked at number one in the "Top Albums" category after a week of its release on iTunes India. It was ranked at top position on Mirchi Top 20 charts.

== Track listing ==
=== Original version ===
The Music was Released on May 27, 2013

All lyrics are written by Irshad Kamil; all music is composed by A. R. Rahman.

No.	Title	Artist(s)	Length
1.	"Raanjhanaa"	Shiraz Uppal, Jaswinder Singh	4:09
2.	"Banarasiya"	Shreya Ghoshal, Anwesha Datta Gupta, Meenal Jain	4:49
3.	"Piya Milenge"	Sukhwinder Singh, K.M.M.C. Sufi Ensemble	5:55
4.	"Nazar Laaye"	Rashid Ali, Neeti Mohan, Nakash Aziz	3:56
5.	"Ay Sakhi"	Madhushree, Chinmayi, Vaishali, Aanchal Sethi	4:02
6.	"Aise Na Dekho"	A. R. Rahman, Karthik	4:16
7.	"The Land of Shiva"	Instrumental	1:10
8.	"Tum Tak"	Javed Ali, Pooja Vaidyanath, Keerthi Sagathia	5:04
9.	"Tu Mun Shudi"	A. R. Rahman, Rabbi Shergill	4:42
Total length:			38:12

The song "Piya Milenge" is based on Raag Jog

=== Ambikapathy (Tamil Version) ===
Ambikapathy

Soundtrack album by A. R. Rahman
- Released: 25 June 2013
- Length: 38:06
- Language: Tamil
- Labels: Sony Music India & Eros Music

The song "Unnaal Unnaal" was released as a promotional single, aired on Radio Mirchi. The track listing of Ambikapathy was revealed on Amazon.com on 17 June 2013.

All lyrics are written by Vairamuthu; all music is composed by A. R. Rahman.

No.	Title	Artist(s)	Length
1.	"Ambikapathy"	Naresh Iyer	4:10
2.	"Kalaarasiga"	Shweta Mohan, Sharanya Srinivas	4:51
3.	"Oliyaaga Vandhaai"	Javed Ali, K.M.M.C. Sufi Ensemble	5:56
4.	"Parakka Seivaai"	Karthik, Mili Nair	3:54
5.	"Kanaave Kanaave"	Chinmayi, Pooja Vaidyanath, Sharanya Srinivas, Madhushree, Vaishali, Aanchal Sethi	4:02
6.	"Paarkaadhey Oru Madhiri"	A. R. Rahman, Karthik	4:17
7.	"The Land of Shiva"	Instrumental	1:10
8.	"Unnaal Unnaal"	Hariharan, Pooja Vaidyanath, Haricharan	5:09
9.	"Solvadhai Seidhu Mudippom"	A. R. Rahman, Mohammed Rafi	4:42
Total length:			38:06

== Accolades ==
Positive awards and nominations
Distributor	Date announced	Category	Recipient	Result	Reference
BIG Star Entertainment Awards	31 December 2013	Most Entertaining Music	A. R. Rahman	Nominated	
Screen Awards	14 January 2014			Nominated	
Screen Awards	14 January 2014	Best Music	A. R. Rahman	Nominated	
Screen Awards	14 January 2014	Best Background Score	Jay N Dudhat	Nominated	
Screen Awards	14 January 2014	Best Sound Design	Arun Nambiar	Nominated	
Apsara Film & Television Producers Guild Award	16 January 2014	Best Music	A. R. Rahman	Nominated	
Idea Filmfare Awards	20 January 2014	Best Music	A. R. Rahman	Nominated	
Idea Filmfare Awards	20 January 2014	Best Background Score	A. R. Rahman	Nominated	
Global Indian Music Awards (GiMA)	20 January 2014	Best Engineer (Film Album)	R. Nitish Kumar	Nominated	
Global Indian Music Awards (GiMA)	20 January 2014	Best Background Score	A. R. Rahman	Nominated	
Global Indian Music Awards (GiMA)	20 January 2014	Best Film Album	A. R. Rahman	Nominated	
Global Indian Music Awards (GiMA)	20 January 2014	Best Playback Singer (Female)	Shreya Ghoshal (for the song "Banarasiya")	Nominated	
Zee Cine Awards	8 February 2014	Zee Cine Award for Best Music Director	A. R. Rahman	Nominated	

== Album credits ==
Backing vocals

Dr. Narayanan, Haricharan, Bakiyaraj, Anand, Santosh Hariharan, Deepak, Harish Iyer, Senbagaraj, Ranina Reddy, S. Malavika, Saundarya. N, Pooja Vaidyanath, Raagini Shri, Sucharita, Priyadarshini, Anitha Karthikeyan, Srinidhi Venkatesh.

Personnel

- Whistle and Harmonization: Karthik (for the song "Aise Na Dekho"/"Paarkaadhey Oru Madhiri")
- Vocal percussion and Vocal shehnai: Chinmayee, Aanchal Sethi (for the song "Ay Sakhi")
- Sitar: Asad Khan
- Shehnai: Balesh and Krishna Ballesh
- Violin: Ganesh Rajagopalan
- Flute: Naveen Kumar (Electrical), Jay N Dudhat (Bass)
- Tabla: Chinna Prasad and Neelakantan
- Guitars: Keba Jeremiah
- Bass: Keba Jeremiah
- Rhythm and percussions: T. Raja, Lakshmi Narayana, Raju, Veda, Kumar, Ramesh

Production

- Producer: A. R. Rahman
- Mastering: Louie Teran at Marcussen Mastering Studios, Los Angeles
- Engineers:
  - Suresh Permal, T. R. Krishna Chetan, Hentry Kuruvilla, Srinidhi Venkatesh, R. Nitish Kumar, Jerry Vincent, Santhosh Dhayanidhi(at Panchathan Record Inn)
  - S. Sivakumar, Kannan Ganpat, Pradeep, Karthick, Anand Krishnan (at A.M. Studios)
  - Tony Joy, Kevin Doucette (at Panchathan Hollywood Studios)
  - Aditya Modi, Hari (at Premier Digital Mastering Studios, Mumbai)
- String engineer: V. J. Srinivasamurthy
- Vocal supervision: V. J. Srinivasa Murthy, Srinivas, Karthik, Srinidhi Venkatesh
- Programming: Hentry Kuruvilla, T. R. Krishna Chetan, Marc (also for the song "The Land of Shiva"), Jerry Vincent, Santosh Dayanidhi
- Mixing: Nitish Kumar
- Project manager: Suresh Permal
- Music co-ordinator: Vijay Mohan Iyer, Priya Chinnaswamy
- Musicians' fixer: R. Samidurai
