= Beiimaan Love =

2016 film by Rajeev Chaudhari

- Theatrical release poster
- Directed by: Rajeev Chaudhari
- Written by: Rajeev Chaudhari & Vibhansu
- Screenplay by: Rajeev Chaudhari
- Produced by: Rajeev Chaudhari
- Starring: Sunny Leone; Rajneesh Duggal; Daniel Weber; Ziesha Nancy
- Edited by: Samar singh
- Music by: Songs: Ankit Tiwari; Kanika Kapoor; Raghav Sachar; Sanjeev–Darshan; Asad Khan; Asees Kaur; Background Score: Aniruddha Kale
- Production company: Avanti Films Pvt Ltd.
- Distributed by: Avanti Films Pvt Ltd.
- Release date: 14 October 2016
- Country: India
- Language: Hindi

Beiimaan Love (transl. Dishonest Love) is a 2016 Indian Hindi-language thriller film directed and produced by Rajeev Chaudhari. It stars Sunny Leone and Rajneesh Duggal and marks the acting debut of Daniel Weber and Ziesha Nancy.

The film was released on 14 October 2016 to negative reviews.

== Plot ==
Sunaina announces at their company stage programme that Daniel is the man behind her success. At the programme reception area, the son of a businessman, Raj meets Sunaina and walks out of the area. At home, Raj's father sits in anger and tells his son to let him be alone. Naresh, the son-in-law tells Raj that he is the cause of the business loss their father is facing now. Raj then goes angrily to Sunaina's house where security men try to stop Raj. Sunaina tells him she still loves Raj. Raj responds that it was too late and leaves the house. Sunaina watches Raj leaving.

The scene shifts back to a night pub. Sunaina comes to attend her friend Natasha's birthday party. Raj, who is fully drunk tries to embrace Sunaina, who refuses. Raj, who is full of anger tells Naresh that he will take revenge on her. Raj sees Sunaina coming out of her office, and realizes that she is working in their company. He makes a bet with Naresh that he will be his slave if he cannot act as lover and then later betray her.

Raj proceeds to act like a changed, hard working man in front of Sunaina. Sunaina ends up falling in love with him. A day comes where Raj is lying with Sunaina in his house and his father finds out about their love and tries to arrange for their marriage. Raj wanted to cheat Sunaina, but as his father and grandmother are now ready for their marriage, Raj agrees for marriage.

On the marriage day, Sunaina's mother is revealed by Raj father's friend as a prostitute, Raj's father tells him to stop the marriage, and Raj confesses he wanted to reject her after acting as a lover. Hearing this, Sunaina becomes very angry and leaves with her mother. Her mother commits suicide. Sunaina, who is sad gets support from Daniel.

Sunaina then becomes a successful businesswoman and is shown overcoming Raj's father's business and getting a Canadian company business deal. Raj's father tries to arrange a marriage between Raj and his alcoholic business friend's daughter. But after a party Raj finds the daughter trying to dance seductively with another guy.

Finally, Raj realises that Sunaina was good and goes back to her house to win her back. Sunaina acts lovingly, but finally one day Sunaina tells him she hates him.

In the last scene, Raj is shown sitting on the roadside. Sunaina appears in a big car, sees Raj sitting and begins to feel sad but after thinking of the past marriage day, Raj's confession and her mother's suicide, Sunaina closes her car door and moves on.

== Cast ==
- Sunny Leone as Sunaina Verma
- Sahil Arora as Sahil Arora
- Rajneesh Duggal as Raj Malhotra
- Daniel Weber
- Zeisha Nancy

== Release ==
Beiimaan Love released on 14 October 2016. The film was not promoted by Sunny and her husband Daniel Weber and Chaudhari claims that it was because he refused to chop off her intimate scenes in the film. "The duo is going through a psychological fear and box-office phobia. Sunny's previous outings have not fared well. After seeing the rough cut, they wanted me to chop off intimate scenes between the actress and Rajneesh. Daniel claimed that he had contributed his bit by revamping Sunny's films on the editing table. But I did not like his interference and requested them to avoid doing so. I think they got upset with my decision," Chaudhari told Mid-Day.

=== Critical reception ===
The Times of India rated the film 2 stars and said, "If you are hankering for a Sunny Leone performance this weekend hop on to Baby Doll on YouTube and call it a day." and for Leone's performance, "Sunny Leone gets A for effort, because her struggle to rise up the content is evident" Filmfare rated the film 2 stars and said "There are two good things about the film, one's Sunny Leone and the other is the film's music. Rest of the movie is jaded, overtly sentimental." IBTimes rated the film 2 stars with appreciating Leone's performance and said, "Watch this Sunny Leone movie if your love for yourself is beiimaan." BollywoodLife rated the film 1 star and said, "Sunny Leone gives her best shot to keep this bad piece of cinema together and the film is not worth your time" Hindustan Times gave 0 stars to the film and said, "Beiimaan Love is a master-class in anger management. You sit through it and the world will be at your feet." India.com rated the film 2 stars and said, "It is silly to watch a Sunny Leone film and expect the seductress to act in it! Well, she can fake a thing or two (no, we are not hinting at her colorful portfolio). But you have to be honest with yourself as indeed with the faith of the filmmakers who cast Sunny in their movies." The Indian Express said, "This is a cringe-fest from start to finish. Stay away. And wave bye bye to Sunny: when a film sinks this low, it's hard to climb back up again." Box Office India said,"While the film has the gusto to hold the plot together, it fails on implementation. It lacks punch and is mediocre fare." Reporter Times rated the film 2.5 stars and said, "The film had featured a great set of comic scenes and connects to target audience very well. But it's not a film for every type of audience, you can watch the movie for time-pass but don't expect much from it. Sunny is not yet complete actress for Bollywood films but she is improving very well. Overall it's the best film by Sunny Leone so far."

== Soundtrack ==
Beiimaan Love

Soundtrack album by Asad Khan, Sanjeev–Darshan, Raghav Sachar, Manj Musik, Ankit Tiwari
- Released: 12 September 2016
- Genre: Feature film soundtrack
- Length: 32:41
- Language: Hindi
- Label: Zee Music Company

No.	Title	Lyrics	Music	Singer(s)	Length
1.	"Hug Me"	Kumaar	Raghav Sachar	Kanika Kapoor, Raghav Sachar	04:26
2.	"Main Adhoora"	Sameer Anjaan	Sanjeev–Darshan	Yasser Desai, Aakanksha Sharma	04:15
3.	"Mar Gaye"	Raftaar	Manj Musik	Manj Musik, Nindy Kaur, Raftaar	03:11
4.	"Pyaar De"	Abhyendra Kumar Upadhyay	Ankit Tiwari	Ankit Tiwari	04:51
5.	"Mere Peeche Hindustan"	Sameer Anjaan	Amjad-Nadeem	Yasser Desai, Sukriti Kakar	03:37
6.	"RangReza (Female)"	Raqueeb Alam	Asad Khan	Asees Kaur	04:29
7.	"RangReza (Male)"	Raqueeb Alam	Asad Khan	Yasser Desai	04:29
8.	"Mar Gaye (Punjabi Version)"	Raftaar	Manj Musik	Manj Musik, Nindy Kaur, Raftaar	03:21
Total length:					32:41

== Awards and nominations ==
Award	Category	Recipients and nominees	Result	Ref.
9th Mirchi Music Awards	Upcoming Male Vocalist of The Year	Yasser Desai – "Rang Reza"	Nominated	
9th Mirchi Music Awards	Upcoming Female Vocalist of The Year	Asees Kaur – "Rang Reza"	Nominated	
9th Mirchi Music Awards	Upcoming Music Composer of The Year	Asad Khan – "Rang Reza (Female)"	Nominated	
