= Kilimanjaro (song) =

Tamil song

- Cover

Song by A. R. Rahman (composer) and Javed Ali, Chinmayi (singers)

from the album Enthiran
- Released: 31 July 2010
- Recorded: 2010; Panchathan Record Inn, Chennai
- Genre: Feature film soundtrack
- Length: 5:32
- Label: Think Music
- Songwriters: A. R. Rahman (music), Pa.Vijay (lyrics)
- Producer: A. R. Rahman

Music video
- "Kilimanjaro" on YouTube

"Kilimanjaro" is a Tamil song from the 2010 Indian film Enthiran, directed by S. Shankar. The song was composed by A. R. Rahman, lyrics penned by Pa.Vijay and sung by Javed Ali and Chinmayi. The Hindi and Telugu version of the song has lyrics respectively written by Swanand Kirkire and Bhuvana Chandra. The song, based on the raga Karaharapriya, is reputed for its use of tribal beats with a catchy chorus and with various musical experiments. Song shooting took place in Machu Picchu in Peru. The song was released in Hindi and Telugu under the same name.

== Music structure and lyrics ==
The song has been composed on raga Karaharapriya. The song features African tribal percussions created by multiple Octapads and vocals, which well suits the song situation. It is sung by noted duo Javed Ali and Chinmayi in all three versions. Singer Chinmayi, who worked with the trio (Rahman, Sankar and Rajinikanth) in the song "Sahana", said it was "a Dream Come True" to sing again for Rajinikanth. The additional vocal arrangements of the song is done by Clinton Cerejo.

The original title of the song is retained in all three versions. The words "Kilimanjaro", "Mohenjo-Daro" etc., originally included by Pa. Vijay, appears in all the versions.

== Release and reception ==
The song was released as part of the soundtrack album of the film on 31 July 2010. The song topped the country charts, holding the #1 position for many continuous weeks. It topped Tamil film music charts for over five months.

The audio along with the entire soundtrack, broke several records in the Indian music industry, testified by its chart positions and digital downloads. It is often praised to be having the "usual Rahman touch".

== Music video ==
The song is picturised on Rajinikanth and Aishwarya Rai singing a duet with a host of tribal dancers in the background. The song sequence was filmed at Machu Picchu in Peru, making it the first Indian video to be picturised on the protected heritage site. According to official sources, there were interventions from the Indian government to grant permission for the shooting, which was denied even for many international projects like Quantum of Solace. It was choreographed by Raju Sundaram, brother of Prabhudeva, who choreographed many other songs in the film.

It was the most expensive Indian music video up until then, costing ₹4 crore ($875,000), equivalent to $1,292,000 (₹9.57 crore) adjusted for inflation.

== Other versions ==
The film is parodied in the film Oru Kal Oru Kannadi (2012) in the song "Kaadhal Oru" with Udhayanidhi Stalin and Hansika Motwani. In the Telugu film Nuvva Nena, the song is parodied with Brahmanandam and Kovai Sarala.

== Awards and nominations ==
=== Won ===
- 2010: Mirchi Music Award for Best Female Playback Singer - Tamil - Chinmayi
- 2010: CSK Academy Of Motion Picture Arts & Science Award for Best Female Playback Singer - Chinmayi
- 2010: MGR Sivaji Academy Award for Best Female Playback Singer - Chinmayi
- 2010: Vijay Music Award for Popular Female Playback Singer - Chinmayi
- 2010: Vijay Music Award for Popular Song of the year
- 2010: Tamil Nadu State Film Award for Best Female Playback - Chinmayi

=== Nominations ===
- 2010: Filmfare Award for Best Female Playback Singer – Tamil - Chinmayi
- 2010: Vijay Award for Best Female Playback Singer - Chinmayi
