= Highway (soundtrack) =

- Digital soundtrack cover art

Soundtrack album to Highway by A. R. Rahman
- Released: 7 February 2014 (Digital); 25 January 2014 (CD)
- Recorded: 2013–2014
- Venues: Panchathan Record Inn and AM Studios, Chennai; AR Studios, Mumbai; Panchathan Hollywood Studios, Los Angeles
- Length: 43:34
- Languages: Hindi, English
- Label: T-Series
- Producer: A. R. Rahman

A. R. Rahman chronology
Raanjhanaa (2013)	Highway (2014)	Kochadaiiyaan (2014)
External audio
- Audio Jukebox on YouTube

Singles from Highway
- 1. "Patakha Guddi (Female Version)" Released: 23 December 2013; 2. "Maahi Ve" Released: 3 January 2014; 3. "Patakha Guddi (Male Version)" Released: 9 January 2014

Highway is the soundtrack album, composed by A. R. Rahman, for the 2014 Hindi film of the same name, directed by Imtiaz Ali. The film stars Randeep Hooda and Alia Bhatt in the lead roles. The film is produced by Sajid Nadiadwala and co-produced by Imtiaz Ali. The soundtrack features nine tracks, which was digitally released by the T-Series label on 7 February 2014. The soundtrack, as well as the film score, garnered a positive critical response from music critics, with some calling the song "Patakha Guddi" one of the top ten songs of 2014.

== Development ==
Originally, the film was intended to have a background score without any songs. On the score of the film Rahman said: "The background score in Highway is more minimalist and it is not locked down to any choreography." In an interview for The Hollywood Reporter, director Imtiaz Ali stated that all of the songs on the soundtrack, except for "Sooha Saha", were recorded after filming was completed.

The track titled "Patakha Guddi" lyrically describes freedom and holds abstracts of purity and wildness. "Maahi Ve" is a ballad focused on Veera (played by Alia Bhatt) and Mahabir (played by Randeep Hooda) as they go through the journey together. The track "Maahi Ve" was not even part of the film originally. After improvising a 20-minute track "Patakha Guddi", the composer decided that the last portion of it could be developed into a completely different song, despite knowing there might not be any place for it in the film. Hence, the rhythms of both the songs are similar. According to composer Rahman, he used a region as musical inspiration, while for others, he used the characters as the jumping off point to creating a song. In an interview with The Indian Express, Rahman said:

I am very fascinated with the concept of actors in Hollywood lip syncing to tracks sung by them. I think it adds a nice and real feel to the song. In Highway, we wanted a natural voice for a lullaby and Imtiaz suggested that we should try Alia. I was not aware that she could sing, but Imtiaz asserted that we should give her a chance. I called Alia for a recording session and realised that her voice has a fine, natural texture which went well with the song.

In the film, as the journey moves from the plains of Punjab to the hills of Himachal, Veera sings this lullaby that reminds Mahabir of his childhood. Alia was made to sing to add more poignancy to the scene. The track "Wanna Mash Up" is a groovy western dance number composed entirely in English with rap and reggae which Alia's character Veera grooves to. Given the situation in the movie, any English song would have fit, however, Rahman decided to compose an original piece. Further, on singing the male version of "Patakha Guddi" Rahman notes: "Singing in Punjabi wasn't difficult as I'd composed the tune, and improvised a lot. All I had to do was work on the pronunciations." It was the first time he had recorded a full-fledged Punjabi track. The track drifts from Sufi tones to a hard rock number through its length. On development of "Highway", lyricist Irshad Kamil stated:

Imtiaz strongly felt that the song must be recorded in Rahman sir's voice to make it more gratifying in its high notes. I couldn't agree more. The only hitch was his Punjabi diction, but we soon came up with a solution. I read out the entire song in Punjabi and sent the voice memo to Rahman sir. Patakha guddi was a long piece. We spent quite a few days working on it. The result is for all of us to see.

The opening refrain of "Tu Kuja" is from the famous Persian phrase but later the song is a pure Hindi track inspired by the Amir Khusro song "Kirpa Karo Maharaj" in praise of Moinuddin Chishti. The track "Heera" involves traditional couplets by Sant Kabir. "Kahaan Hoon Main" is a track that lyrically describes one's self-discovery. Singer Jonita Gandhi who sang this song noted: "It is the song which can take you into the realm of spirituality and lead to self-realisation". Questioned about the mood of the song, the singer, in an interview at The Hindu added: "It is about a girl who is facing new experiences which make her question aspects of her life and journey. It is a song about inner reflection and self-realization, which are themes that everyone can relate to." Nakash Aziz sang the male version of the track "Tu Kuja" that was featured only in the film.

A musical promotional event took place on 18 January 2014 in Mumbai. The event included an interview wherein Rahman described the track "Implosive Silence" as: "a state of mind-soothing yet enigmatic". It is a musical piece trying to capture the sounds in character Veera's mind as she travels along the highway. Later, the singer of the song Jonita Gandhi stated: "The song 'Implosive Silence' isn't a song that requires lyrics – it is very expressive in itself and portrays the emotions felt by the characters in the film." In another interview, Rahman disclosed that for him the most important track in the film was "Implosive Silence". The song being the voice of the main protagonist Veera was compared to brain functions, described as 1000 different questions coming, settling somewhere, not settling somewhere. In Imtiaz Ali's interview with Examiner.com he stated that the music was not necessarily only in the geographical sense, but also in the change of the spirit of the girl. The song in the Salt Pan desert ("Tu Kuja") had influences of the region. The song in the land of Punjab was "Pataakha Guddi", entirely in Punjabi. But other songs drop the regional aspect and concentrate more on the girl's emotions, like the song in the mountains "Wanna Mash Up" and "Maahi Ve" or atop the bus "Kahaan Hoon Main" were not regional but were approached in a more western manner to show the ebullience of one in a situation or mentality like that.

== Release ==
=== Marketing ===
The track titled "Patakha Guddi", sung by the sister duo, Jyoti and Sultana Nooran, was released as a single on 23 December 2013. The track "Maahi Ve" sung by A. R. Rahman was the next single that was released on 3 January 2014. Both singles framed the score of the theatrical trailer. The making of the song "Sooha Saha" was released on 6 January 2014, featuring clips of Bhatt's recording sessions with Rahman. The male version of "Patakha Guddi" was released on 9 January 2014 as the film's third single. Imtiaz Ali had directed a special video with A. R. Rahman and Alia Bhatt; it was released on 14 February 2014.

=== Credits issue ===
On July 24, 2014, the Pakistan based newspaper Roznama Express reported that singer Zeb Bangash, who co-sang the track "Sooha Saahaa" with Alia Bhatt would not be given credit for her performance. The record label's official website removed Zeb's name, and on YouTube, she was not credited alongside Alia, A. R. Rahman and Imtiaz Ali. The matter was reported to Alia Bhatt's father Mahesh Bhatt who was quoted saying, "It is very important for an artiste to be paid and given credit for the work he or she has done. As far as Zeb and my daughter’s song is concerned, I believe that the credit should go to both of them. If the uploaded version of the song only has Alia’s name in the credits, then it is utterly wrong." He added further: "I have always worked for the stability of the relationship between India and Pakistan. I would never want the credit that a Pakistani artist or singer deserves to be given to someone else."

== Critical reception ==
=== Songs ===
Music Aloud rated the album 9 out of 10 and wrote, "The A R Rahman-Imtiaz Ali-Irshad Kamil team delivers yet another musical treat! Totally worth the wait". At Koimoi, Manohar Basu wrote, "For all those who had thought Rahman was losing his Midas touch, well he is back with a bang! The songs in this album are mixed – some you'll take an instant liking for and the rest just grow on you. But each of its numbers is so intoxicating that I promise you will have one hell of a hard time to get these songs off a loop." He rated the album 4 out of 5 and called it 'exemplary'. Indo-Asian News Service gave the album 4 out of 5 stars and wrote, "All in all, the songs of Highway will take music lovers to a different level – it's very powerful and magical." The Critical Review Board at Behindwoods.com in its review said, "A timeless soundtrack crafted for the road !", giving the album a score of 3.75 out of 5. Critic Pawan Jha for the BBC World Service stated, "Another winner from A. R. Rahman and Irshad Kamil" and gave it 3.5 out of 5. Critic Rajiv Vijayakar of Bollywood Hungama stated, "This is a decent A.R. Rahman score after a long gap, in the sense that it will appeal even to those who are not hardcore fans of the composer and his musical grammar (and composition!)." Rating the soundtrack 3 out of 5, he added, "However, for sheer mass connectivity, we still miss the excellence of Ali's Jab We Met and Love Aaj Kal. Those were soundtracks that made the director's films get initial as well as repeat value!" CanIndia News summarised the album stating:

"With offbeat lyrics, brilliant music, and a powerful mix of tracks, this album is ready to take over the charts for a very, very long time. It's as if A.R. Rahman has transmitted all his magic into one album. The album gives you precisely what is expected out of A.R. Rahman's music, if not more. Absolutely mind-blowing and soulful.

Joginder Tuteja for Rediff wrote, "Of all Imtiaz Ali films to date, the music of Highway is the most experimental." Assigning the album a score of 3 out of 5, he added, "In fact, it is obvious that Imtiaz and Rahman were concentrating more on a theme-based soundtrack that seeps into the narrative, rather than the kind that turns out to be a chartbuster and popular in itself." Critic Baradwaj Rangan summarised the album as, "AR Rahman's songs for Highway aren't exactly groundbreaking – and no, that's not an unjustified expectation when it comes to this composer."

=== Background score ===
Manohar Basu at Koimoi noted, "But defending its dissipating premise in the garb of Rahman's mystically well done score isn't what is expected of Ali. one cannot disagree to the fact that it is only Rahman's divine music." For Mumbai Mirror, Rahul Desai wrote,"Rahman's music keeps the pace in check." Critic Sonia Chopra for Sify mentions, "A.R.Rahman's music is haunting and resonates with the film beautifully." At OneIndia, Venkatesh Prasad stated, "Tranquila music of AR Rahman takes the film into a whole different level."Taran Adarsh for Bollywood Hungama notes, "The soundtrack [by maestro A.R. Rahman] never strays from the essence of the film. However, the problem is it lacks popular appeal, for you appreciate the songs as long as they last on screen, but don't hum the tunes once you make an exit from the auditorium. The background score, also by Rahman, is minimal, but effective."

Deborah Young for The Hollywood Reporter stated, "Top composer A. R. Rahman, who won due Oscars for Slumdog Millionaire's music and songs, has less to inspire him than in his previous collaboration with Ali, the music-laden Rockstar. But the soundtrack is still a joy to listen to and makes a fine complement to Anil Mehta's dreamy images of India's soulful landscapes." Viji Alles for UKAsian wrote, "The visual beauty is lifted by A R Rahman's excellent soundtrack." Ronnie Scheib for Variety said, "A. R. Rahman's score is powerful, his music, freed from the staginess of intricately choreographed, multi-costumed setpieces, flows sinuously throughout and evocative songs function mainly as inner voices conveying the characters' unspoken emotions."

== Track listing ==
The track listing was released on A. R. Rahman's official website, the same day as that of the soundtrack's digital release. Irshad Kamil is the sole lyricist, except where noted.

No.	Title	Singer(s)	Length
1.	"Patakha Guddi (Female Version)"	Sultana Nooran, Jyoti Nooran	04:45
2.	"Maahi Ve"	A. R. Rahman	04:00
3.	"Kahaan Hoon Main"	Jonita Gandhi	05:28
4.	"Sooha Saaha"	Zeb Bangash, Alia Bhatt	04:59
5.	"Wanna Mash Up?" (Lyrics By: Lady Kash and Krissy)	Lady Kash and Krissy, SuVi	03:40
6.	"Implosive Silence"	Jonita Gandhi	05:42
7.	"Tu Kuja"	Sunidhi Chauhan	04:29
8.	"Heera" (Lyrics By: Sant Kabir)	Shweta Pandit	04:33
9.	"Patakha Guddi (Male Version)"	A. R. Rahman	05:58
Total length:			43:34

== Personnel ==
Credits adapted from A. R. Rahman's official website.

Backing vocals on the track "Maahi Ve"— Maria Roe Vincent, Rhea Raphael, Neethi Dorairaju

Indian rhythm & percussion: Vedachalam, Vikraman, Venkatesh, Kumar, T.Raja
Flute: Naveen Kumar, Naveen Iyer
Electric guitar: Prasanna
Acoustic guitar: Keba Jeremiah
Ukulele and guitar: Haniya Aslam

Production

- Producer: A. R. Rahman
- Sound design: Resul Pookutty, Amrit Pritam Dutta
- Mastering: Donal Whelan at Mastering World
- Mixing, additional music production on the song "Wanna Mash Up?" :Gil Levy
- Mastering of the tracks "Wanna Mash Up?" and "Implosive Silences" : Gil Levy
- Engineers:
  - Suresh Permal, T. R. Krishna Chetan, Jerry Vincent(at Panchathan Record Inn)
  - S. Sivakumar, Kannan Ganpat, Pradeep, Karthik Sekaran, Anantha Krishnan(at A.M. Studios)
  - Srinidhi Venkatesh, R. Nitish Kumar(at AR Studios, Mumbai)
  - Tony Joy, Ishaan Chhabra (at Panchathan Hollywood Studios)
- Vocal supervision: Srinivas, Nakash Aziz, Srinidhi Venkatesh
- Music supervisor: Srinidhi Venkatesh
- String engineer: V.J. Srinivasamurthy
- Mixing: R. Nitish Kumar, T. R. Krishna Chetan
- Additional mixing: K.J. Singh, T.R. Krishna Chetan, Aditya Modi
- Programming: Ishaan Chhabra, Hentry Kuruvilla, Santosh Dhayanidhi, T. R. Krishna Chetan
- Music co-ordinator: Noell James, Vijay Mohan Iyer
- Musicians' fixer: R. Samidurai
