= Siraj Khan =

Indian sitar player (born 1956)

Ustad Siraj Khan
- Born: 17 April 1956; Indore, Madhya Pradesh, India
- Occupation: Sitar player
- Known for: Hindustani classical music
- Notable credit(s): Performed with Vilayat Khan, Rais Khan, Asad Khan
- Children: Asad Khan
- Website: mewatigharana.com

Siraj Khan (born 17 April 1956) is an Hindustani Classical sitar player known for being the khalifa of Mewati gharana. He is the father and guru of Asad Khan, a sitar player known for his involvement in Bollywood music.

== Background ==
Khan was born to Begum Kaniz Fatima, the daughter of Latif Khan of Mewati Gharana.

Because his grandfather had married Imdad Khan's daughter, Khan's initial training in sitar began with Vilayat Khan, his maternal uncle.

Following, Khan began learning from his maternal cousin, Rais Khan and became his ganda-bandha disciple. Khan also learned vocal music from Ghulam Qadir Khan, his maternal great-uncle, and became his ganda-bandha disciple. According to tradition, after Ghulam Qadir Khan and Rais Khan died, the role of khalifa came to Khan.
