= Semmozhiyaana Thamizh Mozhiyaam =

2010 song by A. R. Rahman

Single by A. R. Rahman
- Released: 15 May 2010
- Recorded: 2010
- Studio: Panchathan Record Inn and AM Studios
- Venue: Chennai
- Genre: Carnatic, folk, acoustic, sufi, rock, rap
- Length: 5:50
- Composer: A. R. Rahman
- Lyricist: M. Karunanidhi
- Producer: A. R. Rahman

"Semmozhiyaana Thamizh Mozhiyaam" (Tamil: செம்மொழியான தமிழ் மொழியாம்; alternately titled Tamil Meet Anthem, World Classical Tamil Conference Theme or Semmozhi) is a Tamil song composed by A. R. Rahman, penned by former Tamil Nadu Chief Minister M. Karunanidhi and performed by several leading Tamil artistes of over three generations. It is the official theme song for the World Classical Tamil Conference 2010, encapsulating the contributions of Tamil culture and literature down the ages. The song, a tribute to the Tamil language, features a fusion of various musical styles, including Carnatic, folk, acoustic, Sufi, rock and rap.

== Background ==
The World Classical Tamil Conference 2010, officially the 9th World Tamil Conference and informally known as the World Tamil Meet, is an international meet by Tamil scholars, researchers, poets, celebrities etc. from all around the world, which was held in Coimbatore from 23 to 27 June 2010. A poem titled Semmozhi was penned by the writer turned politician, M. Karunanidhi specifically for this meet, but with the wider vision that it be an anthem for Tamils across the globe, he demanded this poem to be set to a tune by Tamil composer A. R. Rahman.

Rahman spent 2 1/2 months to complete recording the song, which was widely appreciated upon release. Neither Rahman nor Gautham Vasudev Menon, who directed the song, took any remuneration to do this song. The central message of the song is that all were equal by birth and they should have the feeling that they remained so even later and they should live as one race. Through the lyrics, the history of Tamil literature is also highlighted. After the initial composing was over, a new verse was added highlighting the works of Tamil poets Kambar and Avvaiyar.

== Release ==
The launch of "Semmozhiyaana Tamizh Mozhiyaam" was held on 15 May 2010. The video for the song, directed by Gautham Vasudev Menon, was screened to an extremely positive response. On 18 May 2010, the song was made available for free download from A. R. Rahman's official website and on 21 May 2010 from The Hindu's official website.

== Music video ==
The video directed by Gautham Vasudev Menon showcases the evolution of the Tamil script over time as well as aspects of Tamil culture, Tamil education, and the aesthetic beauty of Tamil locales. The video also features popular websites like Google and Wikipedia in their Tamil language incarnations, as well as Tamil script usage on technologies such as the iPhone. It also features the artistes who were involved in the recording together in front of an orchestration of the words "Semmozhiyaana Thamizh Mozhiyaam." Popular singers Anuradha Sriram and Unni Menon are also featured as part of the group, although they were unavailable for the recording of the song. Bharatanatyam dancer Srinidhi Chidambaram, actresses Samantha Ruth Prabhu, Anjali and actor Akhil as well as actor-cum-film producer Ganesh Janardhanan are also featured in the video. Towards the end of the video, M. Karunanidhi signs off, and a group of youngsters run towards the orchestration.

The video was launched on 29 May 2010 by Tamil Nadu Information and Publicity Minister Parithi Ilamvazhuthi. While launching the video, Ilamvazhuthi said it would be telecast on LED screens fitted in many parts of Coimbatore and screened in all theatres in Tamil Nadu. In Chennai, it would be screened in select places like railway stations, bus terminus and Koyambedu market. Gautham Vasudev Menon, also speaking at the launch, said that shooting the video took over three months due to delays in receiving the necessary permission for aerial shots. He added that while he would have liked to highlight members of the Tamil diaspora, he could not, due to such restraints.

== Personnel ==
=== Song credits ===
==== Playback singers ====
The following playback singers lent their voices for the song. The list is in order of first appearance:

- T. M. Soundararajan
- A. R. Rahman
- Harini
- Chinmayi Sripaada
- Karthik
- Hariharan
- Yuvan Shankar Raja
- Vijay Yesudas
- P. Susheela
- G. V. Prakash Kumar
- T. L. Maharajan
- Bombay Jayashri
- Aruna Sairam
- Nithyasree Mahadevan
- S. Sowmya
- Blaaze
- Lady Kash (of Lady Kash and Krissy)
- Nagoor Brothers
- T. M. Krishna
- Naresh Iyer
- Srinivas
- Dr. K. A. Gunasekaran
- Shruti Haasan
- Unni Menon (Not shown)
- Anuradha Sriram (Not shown)
- Chinna Ponnu

==== Backing vocalists ====
- A. R. Reihana
- Benny Dayal
- Devan Ekambaram
- Neha
- Ujjayinee
- Krissy (of Lady Kash and Krissy)
- Nithin Raj
- Munna
- R. Vijay Narain
- Dr. Narayan
- Bhagyaraj
- Subiksha
- Anitha
- K. Renu
- Maya Sricharan
- Kalyani
- Raqueeb Alam
- Jawidth Ahamed

==== Instrumentalists ====
- Sivamani – drums & percussions
- Pandi selvam – tavil
- Natarajan – nadaswaram

==== Production ====
- Producer: A. R. Rahman
- Engineers: S. Sivakumar, T. R. Krishna Chetan, Suresh Perumal, Srinidhi Venkatesh, Kannan Ganpat, Pradeep Menon
- Mixing: K. J. Singh, P.A.Deepak, Srinidhi Venkatesh
- Mastering: S. Sivakumar
- Programming: T. R. Krishna Chetan
- Coordination: Noell James

=== Video credits ===
==== Actors and actresses ====
- Anjali
- Samantha Ruth Prabhu
- Akhil
- VTV Ganesh

==== Technicians ====
- Direction: Gautham Vasudev Menon
- Cinematography: Manoj Paramahamsa
- Editing: Anthony Gonsalves
- Art Direction: Rajeevan
- Production: Escape Artists Motion Pictures
