= Mohsin Raza (composer) =

Pakistani TV Music Composer

Mohsin Raza (محسن رضا) is a Pakistani television music director.

== Career ==
Mohsin Raza was born in Lahore, Pakistan in 1956. He went to Government College University, Lahore, Pakistan for higher education. He started his career as a music composer in 1971 at age 15. Mohsin Raza learned music from Ustad Nazar Hussain and the pianist Master Saqib of Pakistani Television Corporation at Lahore. He then worked with EMI (Pakistan) from 1973 to 1995 and with the BBC for two years (1984–1985). He has composed music for and conducted more than 500 TV programs for Pakistani television (PTV) and Radio Pakistan.

== Notable Work ==
=== Songs ===
- Naina re naina penned by Qateel Shifai sung by Farida Khanum

=== Ghazals ===
- Niyat-e-shauq bhar na jaye kahin penned by Nasir Kazmi sung by Noor Jehan
- Main tere sang kaise chaloon sajna' penned by Amjad Islam Amjad sung by Noor Jehan
- Shab-e-firaq ki yaro koi sahar bhi ha sung by Abida Parveen
- Dil-e-murter ko samjhaya bohat hai sung by Farida Khanum
- Ghuncha-e-shauq laga hai khilne performed by Mehdi Hassan

=== Patriotic Songs ===
- Roshan meri ankhon main wafa kay jo diyae hain sung by Noor Jehan
- Mera sohna Pakistan jiye performed by Bilqees Khanum
- Kabhi Aei haqeeqat muntazir penned by Allama Iqbal and sung by Mehnaz Begum.

== Awards ==
- 1990: Received Trophy Award at National Horse and Cattle Show by the Chief Minister of Punjab, Pakistan.
- 1992: Received Trophy Award at National Horse and Cattle Show by the President of Islamic Republic of Pakistan.
- 1992: Received Trophy Award at National Games by the President of Islamic Republic of Pakistan.
- 1995: Received Trophy Award at National Horse and Cattle Show by the President of Islamic Republic of Pakistan.
- 1998: Received Trophy Award at 9th PTV Awards by the General Manager of Pakistan Television, Lahore.
- 2006: Received Tamgha-e-Imtiaz (Medal of Excellence) Award by Pervez Musharraf (President of Pakistan)
- 2015: Received Trophy Award at National Horse and Cattle Show
- 2017: Received Sitara-i-Imtiaz (Star of Excellence) Award by Mamnoon Hussain (President of Pakistan)
