= World Classical Tamil Conference 2010 =

International gathering

- Host country: India
- Date: 23 June 2010–27 June 2010
- Cities: Coimbatore (Tamil Nadu)
- Venues: CODISSIA Trade Fair Complex
- Precedes: 2025

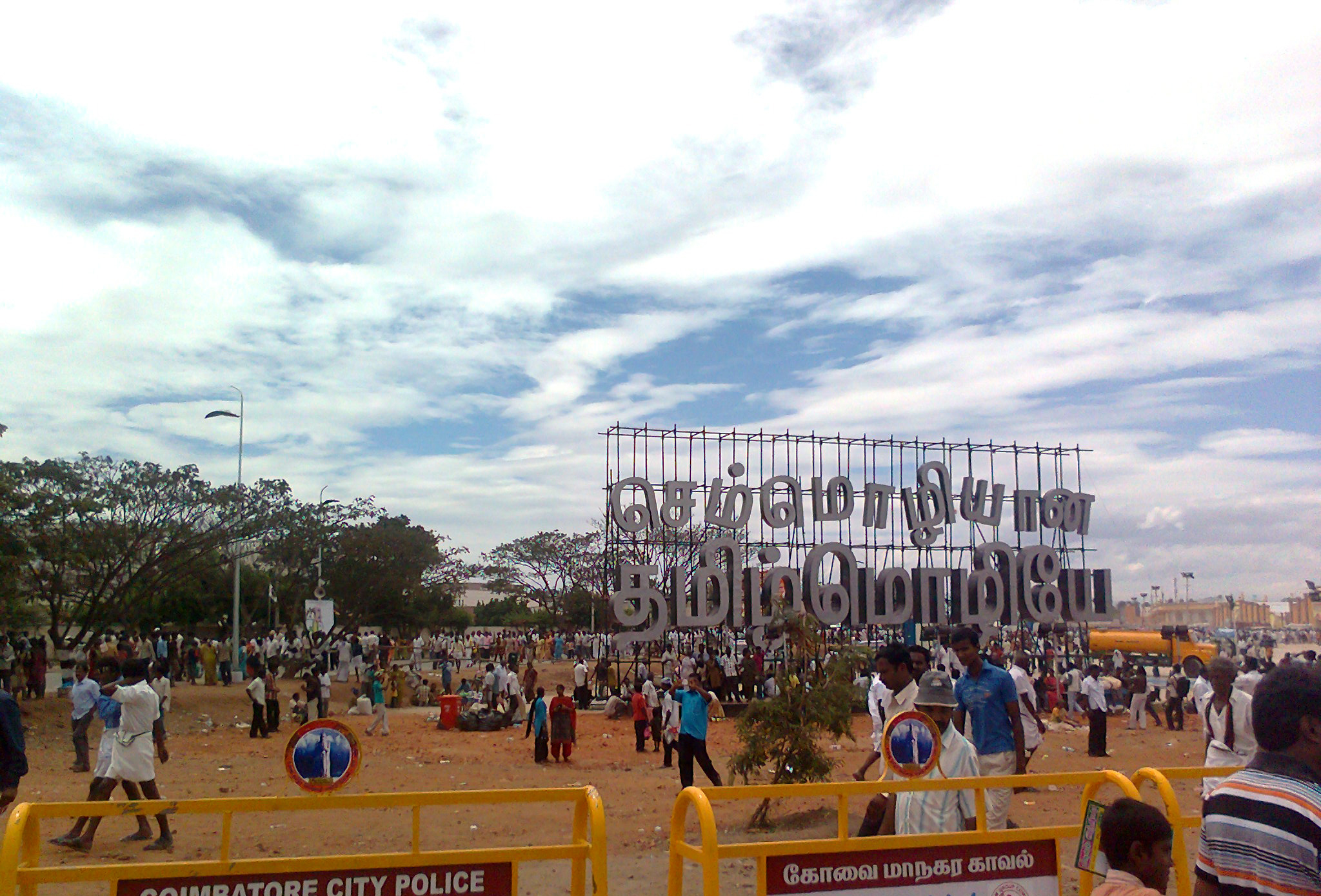
Conference slogan

The World Classical Tamil Conference 2010 was an international gathering of scholars, poets, political leaders and celebrities with an interest in Tamil people, the Tamil language and Tamil literature. It was held in Coimbatore between 23 June and 27 June 2010 with an expenditure of more than 500 Crores.

== Venue ==
The WCTC was held at CODISSIA Trade Fair Complex in Coimbatore and chaired by then chief minister of Tamil Nadu, M. Karunanidhi and was organized by his government.

== Participants ==
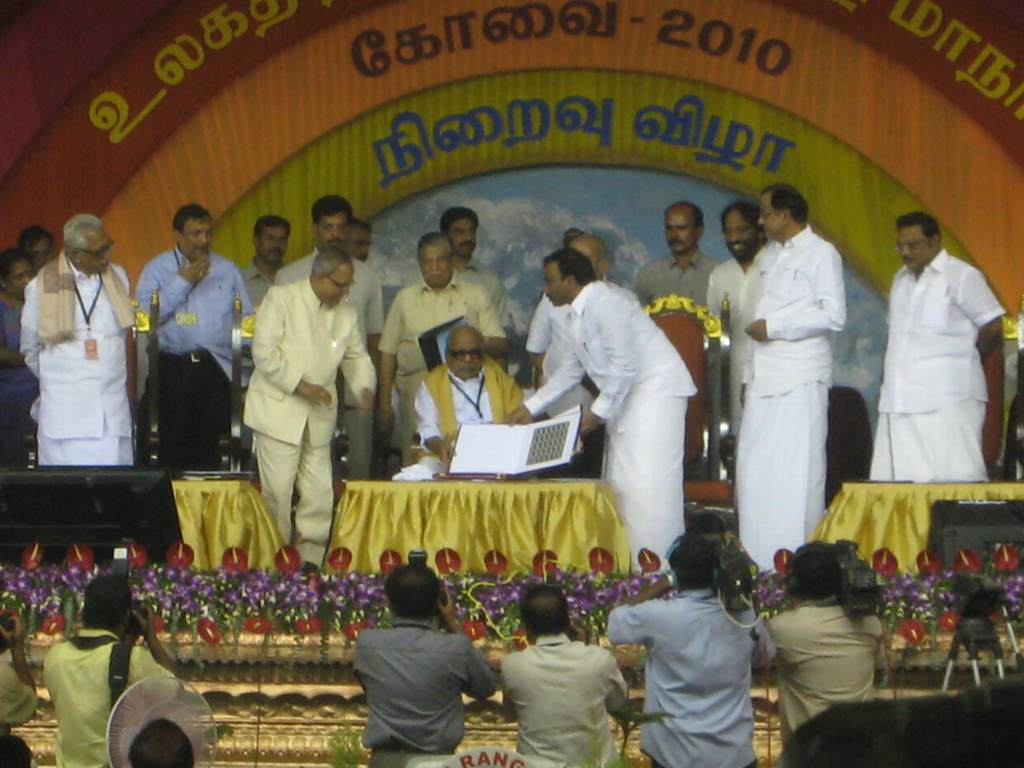
Union Telecom Minister A. Raja presents a commemorative postal stamp to Tamil Nadu Chief Minister M. Karunanidhi at the World Classical Tamil Conference valedictory in Coimbatore on 27 June 2010

The conference was inaugurated by the President of India, Pratibha Patil. Finnish Tamil scholar Asko Parpola was awarded the Kalaignar M. Karunanidhi Classical Tamil award. Tamil scholar V. Sivathambi from Sri Lanka, UNESCO Director Arumugam Parasuraman, MP and political leader Sitaram Yechury of Communist Party of India (Marxist), D. Raja of Communist Party of India, Viduthalai Chiruthaigal Katchi President Thol. Thirumavalavan and Pattali Makkal Katchi founder S. Ramadoss participated in the conference. Dignitaries and Tamil scholars were gifted with an engraved Thanjavur plate.

== Events ==
US Tamil scholar George Hart presented a paper on Sangam literature and Indian epigraphist Iravatham Mahadevan chaired a debate on scripts. Rononjoy Adhikari and Kavitha Gingal from the Institute of Mathematical Science, who were working on a mathematical model to relate the Indus script with the Dravidian language were involved in the debate.

== Theme Song ==
The theme song, "Semmozhiyaana Thamizh Mozhiyaam" was written by then Tamil Nadu Chief Minister M. Karunanidhi with music by A.R. Rahman. The video was directed by Gautham Vasudev Menon featuring artists, musicians, singers.

== Controversies ==
This conference was not approved by the International Association for Tamil Research. Not all agreed with the academic and intellectual rigor of the event.

The conference and associated activities faced opposition and criticisms from various political parties.

== See also ==
- World Tamil Conference
- Tamil diaspora
