= Rais Khan =

Pakistani musician (1939–2017)

Ustad Rais Khan استاد رئیس خان Pride of Performance, Sitara-i-Imtiaz
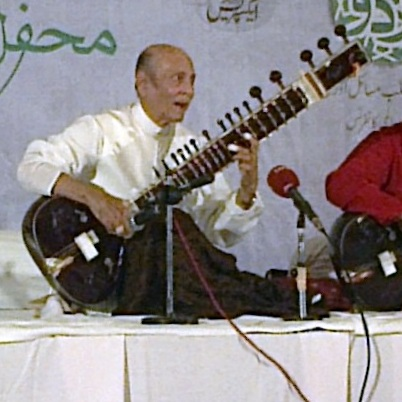
- Khan performing in 2013

Background information
- Born: 25 November 1939; Indore, Indore State, British India
- Died: 6 May 2017 (aged 77) Karachi, Sindh, Pakistan
- Genre: Hindustani classical music
- Occupation: Instrumentalist
- Instrument: Sitar
- Years active: 1948 – 2017

Pride of Performance Recipient by the President of Pakistan in 2005 Sitara-i-Imtiaz (Crescent of Excellence) Award by the Government of Pakistan in 2017
- Date: 2005
- Country: Pakistan
- Presented by: Pervez Musharraf, President of Pakistan

Ustad Rais Khan (Urdu: رئیس خان; 25 November 1939 – 6 May 2017) was a Pakistani sitarist. At his peak he was regarded as one of the greatest sitar players of all time. He continued performing till his last days. He moved from India to Pakistan in 1986, where he took up Pakistani citizenship.

In 2017, Khan was awarded Pakistan's third highest civilian honour, the Sitara-i-Imtiaz (Crescent of Excellence), by the Government of Pakistan.

== Personal life ==
Rais Khan was born on 25 November 1939 in Indore, Indore State, British India, to an Urdu-speaking family. His Rajput family had produced numerous sitar players, beginning with Ustad Imdad Khan, the first sitar player in India and Pakistan to be recorded. He grew up in Bombay. His training began at a very young age, on a small coconut shell sitar. In 1986, he moved to Pakistan, seven years after marrying his fourth wife – Pakistani singer Bilqees Khanum. In 1979, the two had met for the first time at an event by the Sabri Brothers in Karachi. Khanum and Rais Khan had two sons, Farhan Rais Khan and Hazoor Hasnain Rais Khan. Rais Khan had four sons from his previous marriages: Sohail Khan, Cezanne Khan, Farhan Khan and Huzoor Hasnain Khan.

== Career ==
Rais Khan belonged to the Mewati gharana (classical music lineage), which is connected to Indore gharana and the "beenkar baz gayaki ang" (singing style combined with rudra veena approaches) carried out by Rais Khan's father Mohammed Khan, a rudra veena player and a sitarist. "Belonging to the Mewati gharana which goes back to the Mughal period, it produced famous singers Haddoo, Hasso and Nathu Khan, and later singers such as Bade Ghulam Ali Khan, as well as sitarists and sarod players."

"The famous Indian sitar player Ustad Vilayat Khan is his maternal uncle who came to live with them when Vilayat's father died. Rais Khan denies there is any friction between them, contrary to the rumours that exist even today. He praises Ravi Shankar, said to be a rival too, as a brilliant musician who has introduced the sitar to the world."

Despite his extensive meend work and the gandhar pancham sitar style he used, Rais Khan's alapi, gatkari and gamaki work was different in approach, pacing, and even technique, from the Etawah style. Amongst the khayal and dhrupad doyens, Rais Khan's gharana had the classical music lineage containing the masters Haddu Khan, Hassu Khan, Nathan Khan, Bande Ali Khan, Babu Khan, Wazir Khan, Waheed Khan, Murad Khan, Latif Khan, Majid Khan, Nazeer Khan, Amanat Khan and Rajab Ali Khan of Dewas.

As Rais Khan's mother was a singer and his father was a beenkar (veena player), a unique combination of khyal (the most popular classical vocal style), dhrupad (the older and more orthodox classical form) and thumri (lyrical semi-classical form) – 'angs' (approaches) developed in his playing.

He gave his first public concert at Sunderbai Hall in the presence of the then Governor of Bombay Sir Maharaja Singh. In 1955, Khan was chosen to represent India in the International Youth Festival in Warsaw, where 111 countries took part in the string instrument conference. He has also performed at the Kennedy Center. While in India, he played film music for Talat Mahmood, Lata Mangeshkar, Mohammed Rafi and Asha Bhosle. In India, he played a key role by his association with film composers like Khayyam, Madan Mohan which resulted in many super-hit songs. He had toured extensively throughout the world.

He was also a vocalist and was the first sitar player to record the super-hit song "Ghungroo Toot Gaye" for BBC London in 1978 as an instrumental song with the sitar. This song was originally written by Qateel Shifai, music by Nisar Bazmi for a Pakistani film Naz (1969). Like his uncle Vilayat Khan, whose music had exercised considerable influence on him, he often sang and demonstrated compositions on the sitar. Rais and Bismillah Khan (shehnai player) used to collaborate and perform together in live concerts as a duo, like the one at India Gate in New Delhi on 23 November 2001.

For sometime, Rais Khan stopped performing, but returned in the 1980s and was invited by Ali Akbar Khan to perform in California.

Rais Khan sometimes performed with his son Farhan, as he did in a 2009 performance for Pakistan Television (PTV) produced TV show Virsa- Heritage Revived, accompanied by Tari Khan on tabla. In 2012, he performed at the Nehru Centre in Mumbai. In 2014, he performed "Hans Dhuni" and "Mein Sufi Hoon" (with Abida Parveen) in season 7 of Coke Studio Pakistan.

== Death ==
After a prolonged illness, Rais Khan died on 6 May 2017 in Karachi at the age of 77. Among his survivors are his singer-wife Bilqees Khanum and four sons. In 2012, one major Pakistani English-language newspaper commented about his declining health, "He proudly says that his decades old habit of smoking 115 cigarettes a day, which is the reason for his declining health, came to an abrupt end four years ago when the doctor ordered him to stop."

Shortly after his death in 2017, National Academy of Performing Arts (NAPA) held a musical night in tribute to Rais Khan.

On his death, Urdu writer Anwar Maqsood remarked that “God had given him a rare gift. His fingers had that rare touch.” In a tweet, Indian singer Lata Mangeshkar called Khan “sitar ke jaadugar” (lit. magician of sitar).

== Legacy ==
Rais Khan taught many disciples including his sons, Farhan Rais Khan and Suheil Rais Khan, his cousin, Siraj Khan, Swanand Arole, Ajay Talgiri, Bobby Grover and others.

Khan is regarded as one of the most influential sitarists of the post-Independence era of the Indian subcontinent.

== Awards ==
- Pride of Performance award by the President of Pakistan in 2005.
- Sitara-i-Imtiaz (Star of Excellence) by the Government of Pakistan in 2017.
