= Garhi Shahu =

Garhi Shahu گڑھی شاہُو
- Neighbourhood
- LOcation of Garhi Shahu in Lahore
- Coordinates: 31°34′N 74°21′E
- Country: Pakistan
- Province: Punjab
- City: Lahore
- Tehsil: Lahore City

Government
  - Type: Union Council

Garhi Shahu (Punjabi, Urdu: گڑھی شاہُو) (lit. 'Fortress of Shahu') is a union council and historic neighbourhood in Lahore City Tehsil of Lahore, Punjab, Pakistan. Garhi Shahu is one of Lahore's oldest residential neighbourhoods outside the Old City and is located near Lahore Junction railway station. Garhi Shahu is home to imposing government buildings like the huge Governor’s House, with colonial-era Indo-Gothic arches and Palladian colonnades, and the 1938 Punjab Assembly. Among modern buildings in the locality, the Alhamra Art Center stages drama and art exhibitions, while Al-Falah Theatre shows popular plays and comedy. The area is named after the notorious 19th-century gang leader and robber baron Shahu.

== History ==
=== Early history and etymology (pre-1880) ===
The area known today as Garhi Shahu was known as Mohallah Syedan during the 17th century. It was named after Syed Jan Muhammad Hazuri, a resident religious scholar who is also the namesake of the Hazuri Bagh. The area was a prominent neighbourhood home to many religious intellectuals, including well-known Baghdadi scholar Abu Khair who maintained a renowned madrassah there. After the fall of the Mughal Empire, the area fell into anarchy. Mohallah Syedan was located in a lawless area between the domains of the three Sikh kings in the 19th century.

During this time, a gangster named Shahu took power of this area. He had a gang of robber barons. He expropriated Abu Khair's sizable madrassah to maintain a storage house for stolen goods. The Sikhs, and then the British, would later refer to it Garhi Shahu, aka Shahu's Fortress or Fortalice.

=== British period and the Railway Station (1880–1947) ===
The railway system in the Indian subcontinent operated as a system of private companies, including the Scinde Railway, and public rail lines, such as the Punjab Railway that connected Lahore and Karachi. In 1886, the British Raj amalgamated all private and public rail systems as The North Western State Railway to both secure the border against Afghanistan and meet the increased demand to transport raw materials. The Lahore Railway Station, finished in 1860, became a prominent junction and railway workers were required.

Garhi Shahu neighbourhood was adjacent to the Lahore Railway Station, and so became home to large residential colonies for white British railway workers. Later, the British brought in upper-caste Goan Catholics to work the railway as professionals, including in the Punjab Police and the railway police. Low-wage workers included Punjabi Muslims and Dalit Christians. After Partition, many Goan Catholics left, though Dalit Christians and Muslims would stay.

=== Post-partition history (1947–present) ===
The North Western State Railway became the Pakistan Railways after 1947. Today, the area still serves as residence to workers, professionals, and low-wage workers connected to the railway. It has some elite institutions like Aitchison College and Lahore Gymkhana. Because of its centrality and historical significance, Garhi Shahu is home to many prominent institutions and places, while it is connected to significant thoroughfares around the city. Abu Khair's madrassah still stands today as a mosque.

The area has a sizable minority Christian population as well. Other than the massive Cathedral Church of The Resurrection on Mall Road, the area has prominent churches like the Naulakha Presbyterian Church and St. Anthony Church on Empress Road. There is also an important Christian cemetery adjacent to the area in the historic Hindu neighbourhood Dharampura.

In 2012, the Lahore Development Authority took control of Gosha-e-Aman, a large Christian complex in the neighbourhood that included a covenant, a church, and small residences. The property was demolished, which ignited large-scale protests by civil society and the Christian community.

== Notable places ==
- Lahore Railway Station
- Aitchison College
- Govt Queen Mary College
- Convent of Jesus and Mary
- Governor House
- Victoria Park
- Aiwan-e-Iqbal Complex
- Burt Hall
- Lahore Gymkhana
- Alhamra Arts Center
- Bibi Pak Daman Shrine
- Faletti's Hotel
