= Enthiran (soundtrack) =

2010 album by A. R. Rahman

- Album cover for Enthiran

Soundtrack album by A. R. Rahman
- Released: 31 July 2010
- Recorded: 2008
- Studios: Panchathan Record Inn and AM Studios, Chennai
- Genre: Feature film soundtrack
- Length: 34:35
- Language: Tamil
- Label: Think Music
- Producer: A. R. Rahman

A. R. Rahman chronology
Puli (2010)	Enthiran (2010)	Jhoota Hi Sahi (2011)

Enthiran is the soundtrack album to the 2010 Tamil science fiction-action film of the same name, directed by S. Shankar and starring Rajinikanth and Aishwarya Rai. The soundtrack album includes seven tracks composed by A. R. Rahman and was released on 31 July 2010 by Think Music. The release coincided with a promotional event held at the Putrajaya International Convention Centre near Kuala Lumpur, Malaysia.

The album also was dubbed and released in Telugu as Robo on 6 August 2010, while its dubbed Hindi version, Robot, was released on 14 August 2010. The former was released on Think Music itself, but the latter was released by Venus.

== Release ==
The soundtrack album's release rights in Tamil and Telugu were purchased by Think Music for ₹7 crore. The songs "Kadhal Anukkal" and "Arima Arima" were aired for the first time on Suryan FM on 30 July, a day before the soundtrack release.

The Tamil album was officially released on 31 July 2010, which coincided with a promotional event held at the Putrajaya International Convention Centre near Kuala Lumpur, Malaysia. Co-hosted by Vivek and Punnagai Poo Gheetha, the event was attended by most of the film's cast and crew members, including Kalanithi Maran, S. Shankar, Rajinikanth, Aishwarya Rai, A. R. Rahman, Santhanam, Karunas, Vairamuthu, R. Rathnavelu, Anthony, Sabu Cyril, and Yogi B. Other invited guests were Dayanidhi Maran, Radha Ravi, Vadivelu, Shriya Saran, Jayam Ravi, Ramya Krishnan, S. A. Chandrasekhar, Aishwarya and Soundarya Rajinikanth, Krish, and Sangeetha Arvind. Furthermore, Silambarasan, Vijayalakshmi, and Poorna were part of stage performances.

The release event of the Telugu version, titled Robo, was held in Hyderabad on 6 August 2010, which was attended by Chiranjeevi, D. Ramanaidu, Mohan Babu, Srinu Vaitla, Kajal Aggarwal, and Kamna Jethmalani. The Hindi version, titled Robot, was released by Venus on 14 August 2010, in a function held in Mumbai. The event was attended by Amitabh Bachchan, Jaya Bachchan and Abhishek Bachchan, along with the crew of the film.

== Music videos ==
The songs were choreographed by Prabhu Deva, Raju Sundaram, Remo D'Souza, Dinesh and Shobi. The first song "Pudhiya Manidha" was the introduction song for Vaseegaran and Chitti (both played by Rajinikanth) and also appeared in the opening credits. It was choreographed by Prabhu Deva with his Bharata Natyam trained assistant Ajeesh dancing for the robot. "Kadhal Anukkal", again choreographed by Prabhu Deva, is a love song picturised on Vaseegaran and Sana (played by Aishwarya Rai). The song was completely shot from Lençóis Maranhenses National Park in northeastern Brazil. "Irumbile Oru Irudhaiyam", which marked the singing debut of Lady Kash and Krissy in Tamil cinema, was choreographed by Remo D'Souza and was picturised as a club dance number between Chitti and Sana. "Chitti Dance Showcase", a short and mostly instrumental song was choreographed by Shobi and was picturised on Vaseegaran, Chitti and Sana.

"Arima Arima" was set in Ramoji Rao Film City, Hyderabad and was choreographed by Prabhu Deva. It was picturised on Chitti, his robot army and Sana. According to the director S. Shankar, art director Sabu Cyril and cinematographer R. Rathnavelu, picturising this song was the most challenging part of the whole film. The song also features two robotic lions, the creation of which, according to Sabu Cyril, is a professional secret. In an interview, Ratnavelu said, "This film has been a big challenge right from the start till the patchwork. But the most challenging part for me was shooting the climax song, Arima Arima, which will be the USP of the film. The song was shot in a set in Hyderabad in 2008. I had to perceive in 2008 what would be in vogue now. So, that was a real challenge and that has come out really well."

The most notable song in terms of picturisation, "Kilimanjaro", is picturised on Rajinikanth and Aishwarya Rai singing a duet with a host of tribal dancers in the background. The song sequence was filmed at Machu Picchu in Peru, making it the first Indian video to be picturised from the protected heritage site. According to official sources, there were interventions from the Indian government to grant permission for the filming, which was denied to many international projects, such as Quantum of Solace (2008). It was choreographed by Raju Sundaram.

The last song, "Boom Boom Robo Da", shot from Himachal Pradesh and Chennai, was choreographed by Dinesh and picturised on Vaseegaran, Sana and Chitti.

== Reception ==
The soundtrack has received generally positive reviews and on the second day of release, the album was on top of the US iTunes Top 10 World Albums chart, making it the first Indian album to reach the spot. In the United Kingdom, Enthiran ranked third place on iTunes and by the following day occupied the top spot successfully. In Australia, Enthiran ranked on the top spot by 5 August. The soundtrack has topped the Indian charts too. The first five positions was defended by Enthiran songs for more than three months. "Kadhal Anukkal" topped the charts for more than eight weeks. The Hindi version, "Pagal Anukan", peaked at #4 position in the weekly charts. The audio is said to have created history and have registered a record breaking sale in the Indian audio market.

=== Critical response ===
==== Tamil version ====
Professional ratings
Review scores
Source	Rating
Behindwoods	3.5/5 stars
The Hindu	(positive)
Music Aloud	8.5/10 stars
Rediff	3/5 stars

The soundtrack received mostly positive critical responses. The Hindu commented on the album that "With its blend of melody, trance and rhythm, Enthiran – The Robot sounds like a winner". Chennai online stated that "The entire album gives an upbeat electro sense and wings to our imaginations. The music is convinced to grow on you, if not an instant hit." A review by Music Aloud said, "While the soundtrack of Enthiran has enough fodder to delight a connoisseur, it remains to be seen how much its sophistication will appeal to the masses, who are after all Rajinikanth's primary target." Behindwoods reviewed the music saying, "Yes, it exasperates you when you listen for the first time. But as you listen again, you realize that though Rahman gives this album a crisp metallic touch in keeping with the theme of the story, he still remains faithful to his Carnatic roots in a touching way." Pavithra Srinivasan of Rediff commented that, "Enthiran is, in fact, a perfect superstar album. Where the collection does manage to veer from the usual, Rahman has managed to add his own quirky, creative notes to the songs."

==== Hindi version ====
Professional ratings
Review scores
Source	Rating
Bollywood Hungama	1.5/5 stars
Hindustan Times	(positive)
IBN Live	2/5 stars
NDTV	(mixed)
Rediff	2.5/5 stars
The Times of India	(mixed)

The Hindi version received mixed to negative responses, with most of the reviewers criticising Swanand Kirkire's lyrics. Bollywood Hungama rated the album 1.5 out of 5 saying, "Robot disappoints. While Rahman himself hasn't come up with anything exceptional, something which is expected from him film after film; it's the lyrics that are chief culprit here. It is clear that a lot has been lost in translation here, literally so, as the song dubbing Tamil to Hindi just doesn't work here." Rediff rated the Hindi version 2.5 on 5 and commented that Robot is not Rahman's best, to say the least. The Times of India commented that "On the whole, the music of Robot does not appeal. They may suit the script of the sci-film, but the audio is not impressive."

== Track listing ==
Enthiran - Tamil
No.	Title	Lyrics	Singer(s)	Length
1.	"Puthiya Manidha"	Vairamuthu	S. P. Balasubrahmanyam, A. R. Rahman, Khatija Rahman	6:11
2.	"Boom Boom Robot Da"	Madhan Karky	Yogi B, Keerthi Sagathia, Shweta Mohan, Tanvi Shah	4:28
3.	"Irumbile Oru Idhaiyam"	Madhan Karky, Kash n' Krissy	A. R. Rahman, Kash n' Krissy	5:13
4.	"Kadhal Anukkal"	Vairamuthu	Vijay Prakash, Shreya Ghoshal	5:45
5.	"Chitti Dance Showcase"		Pradeep Kumar, Pravin Mani, Yogi B	2:44
6.	"Kilimanjaro"	Pa. Vijay	Javed Ali, Chinmayi	5:32
7.	"Arima Arima"	Vairamuthu	Hariharan, Sadhana Sargam, Naresh Iyer	5:22
Total length:				35:14

Robo - Telugu
No.	Title	Lyrics	Singer(s)	Length
1.	"O Maramanishi"	Suddala Ashok Teja	S. P. Balasubrahmanyam, Srinivas, A. R. Rahman, Khatija Rahman	6:11
2.	"Boom Boom Robo Ra"	Bhuvanachandra	Yogi B, Keerthi Sagathia, Shweta Mohan, Tanvi Shah	4:26
3.	"Inumulo O Hridhayam"	Suddala Ashok Teja	A. R. Rahman, Kash n' Krissy	5:16
4.	"Neelo Valapu"	Vanamali	Vijay Prakash, Shreya Ghoshal	5:45
5.	"Chitti Dance Showcase"		Pradeep Kumar, Pravin Mani, Yogi B	2:45
6.	"Kilimanjaro Bhala"	Suddala Ashok Teja	Javed Ali, Chinmayi, Anuj	5:30
7.	"Harima Harima"	Vanamali	Hariharan, Sadhana Sargam, Benny Dayal, Naresh Iyer	5:20
Total length:				35:13

All lyrics are written by Swanand Kirkire.

Robot - Hindi
No.	Title	Singer(s)	Length
1.	"O Naye Insaan"	Srinivas, A. R. Rahman, Khatija Rahman	6:11
2.	"Boom Boom Robo Da"	Yogi B, Keerthi Sagathia, Madhushree, Ravi 'Rags' Khote	4:28
3.	"Naina Miley"	A. R. Rahman, Suzanne D'Mello, Kash n' Krissy	5:15
4.	"Pagal Anukan"	Mohit Chauhan, Shreya Ghoshal	5:46
5.	"Chitti Dance Showcase"	Pradeep Kumar, Pravin Mani, Yogi B	2:44
6.	"Kilimanjaro"	Javed Ali, Chinmayi, Clinton Cerejo	5:32
7.	"Arima Arima"	Hariharan, Sadhana Sargam, Benny Dayal, Naresh Iyer	5:19
Total length:			35:17

== Background score ==
Enthiran

Film score by A. R. Rahman
- Released: 28 November 2018
- Recorded: 2008–2009
- Studios: Panchathan Record Inn and AM Studios, Chennai
- Genre: Feature film score
- Length: 28:43
- Label: Think Music
- Producer: A. R. Rahman

No.	Title	Length
1.	"Vasigaran's Lab"	1:57
2.	"Enthiran"	3:08
3.	"Chitti's Influence"	3:20
4.	"Chitti to the Rescue"	4:00
5.	"Lack of Empathy"	1:37
6.	"Andro-Humanoid Test Failed"	1:00
7.	"Chitti Goes Wild"	1:28
8.	"Chitti Betrays Vasi"	3:00
9.	"Red Chip Installation"	1:25
10.	"Power Hungry Robots"	1:49
11.	"Ball Formation Mode"	1:48
12.	"The Giant Emerges"	2:04
13.	"Helicopter Attacked"	1:01
14.	"Chitti Bids Farewell"	1:06
Total length:		28:43

== Album credits ==
=== Backing vocals ===
Dr. Narayanan, Raqeeb Alam, R. Vijay Narain, Renu Kannan, Nithin Raj, Shahid, Megha, Madhumitha, Shubiksha, Janani, Nrithya, Senthil, Sridhar Vijay, Kaushik, Arjun, Sharadha, Swetha Mohan, Clinton Cerejo, Dominique Cerejo, Francois Castellino, Newman Pinto, Vivianne Pocha, Bianca Gomes

=== Instruments ===
- Drums - V. Kumar
- Percussions - T. Raja, Vedachalam, Neelakandan, Lakshminarayanan, Raju
- Bass Guitar - Keith Peters
- Guitar - Sanjeev Thomas, George
- Flute - Naveen Kumar
- Trumpet - Thomas

=== Production ===
- Composer: A. R. Rahman
- Sound Engineers: P. A. Deepak, T. R. Krishna Chetan, Vivianne Chaix, Suresh Permal, Srinidhi Venkatesh, S. Sivakumar, Kannan Ganpat, Pradeep, Dinesh Ramalingam
- String Engineer: V. J. Srinivasamurthy
- Mixing: K. J. Singh, P. A. Deepak
- Mastering: S. Sivakumar
- Programming: T. R. Krishna Chetan, P. A. Deepak, Hentry Kuruvilla
- Music coordination: Noell James, Faizuddin T.M.
