= List of Sufi singers =

The following is a categorically arranged list of notable singers of Sufi music. (Note: This excludes singers who happen to be Sufi, but do not make Sufi music)

== Ghazal ==
- Ghulam Ali
- Mehdi Hassan
- Nusrat Fateh Ali Khan
- Reshma
- Jagjit Singh
- Roop Kumar Rathod

== Kafi ==
- Abida Parveen
- Pathanay Khan

== Qawwali ==
- Jaani Babu
- Abdullah Manzoor Niazi
- Farid Ayaz
- Saami Brothers
- Aziz Mian
- Nusrat Fateh Ali Khan
- Sabri Brothers
- Qawwal Bahauddin Khan
- Ateeq Hussain Khan
- Rahat Fateh Ali Khan
- Wadali Brothers
- Dhruv Sangari (Bilal Chishty Sangari)
- Badar Miandad
- Faiz Ali Faiz
- Shankar Shambhu
- Amjad Sabri
- Qutbi Brothers
- Rais Anis Sabri

== Sufi Rock ==
- Ali Azmat
- Ali Baba Khan
- Asrar
- Atif Aslam
- Ali Zafar
- A. R. Rahman
- Nusrat Fateh Ali Khan
- Satinder Sartaj

== Other genres of Sufi music ==
- Brother Ali
- Toshi Sabri
- Krishna Beura
- Ahmed Bukhatir
- Anitha Shaiq
- Kailash Kher
- Saieen Zahoor Ahmad
- Allan Fakir
- Kavita Seth
- Barkat Sidhu
- Hans Raj Hans
- Dhruv Sangari
- Mamta Joshi
- Master Muhammad Ibrahim
- Master Saleem
- Muhammad Juman
- Muhammad Yousuf
- Reshma
- Satinder Sartaaj
- Shafqat Amanat Ali Khan
- Shahram Nazeri
- Shaukat Ali
- Wadali brothers
- Harshdeep Kaur
- Rabbi Shergill
- Madan Gopal Singh
- Raja Hasan
- Rubina Qureshi
- Alam Lohar & Arif Lohar
- Sanam Marvi
- Salman Ali
- Nisa Azeezi
