= Pandoke =

Pandoke may refer to:

- Pandoke, Lahore, a village in Punjab, Pakistan
- Pandoke, Gujranwala, a village in Punjab, Pakistan.
