= Bulleh Shah =

Punjabi philosopher and poet (1680–1757)

- بُلّھے شاہ
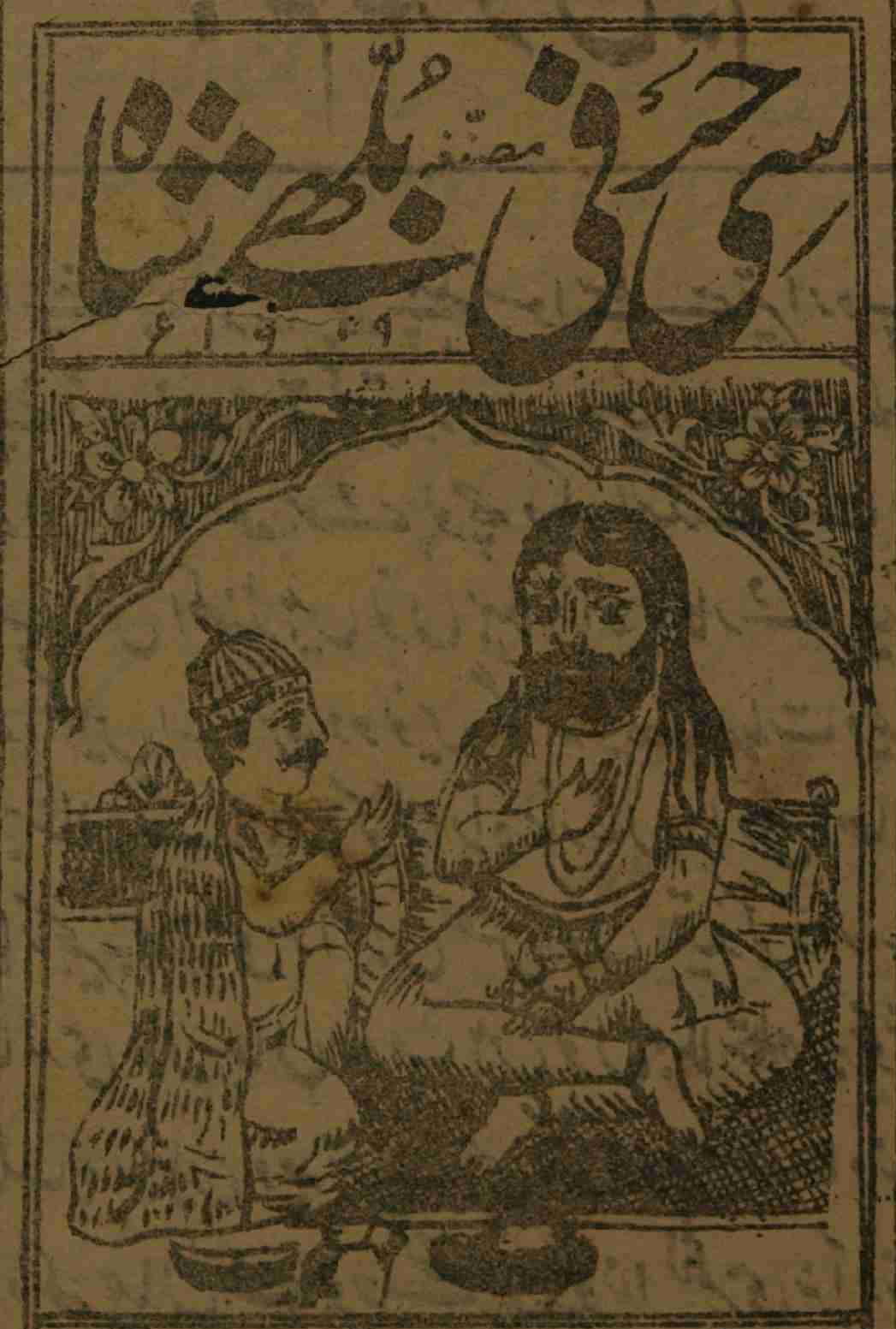
- Depiction of the Bulleh Shah (seated right), detail from the title-page of 'Siharfi Bulleh Shah', published by the Mufid-i-Am Press, Munshi Gulab Singh & Sons, Lahore, circa late 19th century

Personal life
- Born: Sayyid Abdullāh Shāh Qādrī c. 1680 Uch, Multan Subah, Mughal Empire
- Died: 30 August 1757 (aged 76–77) Kasur, Lahore Subah, Mughal Empire
- Resting place: Darbar Baba Bulleh Shah, Kasur
- Parents: Shah Muhammad Darwaish (father); Fatima Bibi (mother)
- Main interests: Tassawuf; ishq; philosophy; poetry; Divine love; humanism

Religious life
- Religion: Islam

Muslim leader
- Teacher: Shah Inayat Qadiri
- Influenced by: Shah Hussain Shah Inayat Qadiri Baba Farid Sultan Bahu
- Influenced: Mian Muhammad Bakhsh Khwaja Ghulam Farid Bhagat Singh Muhammad Iqbal Ali Arshad Mir Faiz Ahmad Faiz Nusrat Fateh Ali Khan Pathanay Khan Jam Saqi Abida Parveen Taimur Rahman
- Writing career
- Pen name: Bulleh Shāh; Bulleyā
- Language: Punjabi
- Genres: Love; divine love; Islamic mysticism; society; nature; self-reflection; Nazm; Kafi

Sayyid Abdullah Shah Qadri (Note: Punjabi: سید عبداللہ شاہ قادری, pronounced [ˈsəˈjəd əbdʊ‿ˈláː ʃáː kaːdᵊɾiː]) (c. 1680 – 1757), popularly known as Baba Bulleh Shah (Note: also romanised as Bullhē Shāh; Punjabi: بُلّھے شاہ, pronounced [ˈbʊlːèː ʃáː]) and vocatively as Bulleya, (Note: also romanised as Bullhēyā; Punjabi: بُلھیا, pronounced [bʊlːè'(j)aː]) was a Punjabi philosopher, reformer and poet, regarded as one of the greatest poets of the Punjabi language. His literary oeuvre, comprising over 150 kafi and 94 other poetic compositions, reflect themes of Sufi and humanist philosophy—for which he is regarded as 'Poet of the People'. (Note: Punjabi: لوکاں دے شاعر, romanized: Lōkāñ dē śā'ir)

Born in Uch, Multan Subah, Bulleh Shah belonged to a family of religious scholars. In his juvenile years, his family moved to Malakwal, and later Pandoke, in the Subah of Lahore; where he got his early education from his father, while working as a herder, in the village. He received his higher religious education at Kasur from Hafiz Ghulam Murtaza; and later studied in Lahore under Shah Inayat Qadiri.

Bulleh Shah's poetry resonated with a wide audience due to the use of colloquial language; employing metaphors and imagery to convey complex spiritual ideas to those outside formal religious circles. He became known for his mystic poetry, which blended his philosophy of oneness of god, divine love, social equality; and critiqued social norms and institutions for exploiting the ordinary people. Bulleh Shah's works also left an impact on the Punjabi language, marking a new era of Punjabi literature which helped propagate a literary variety of Punjabi, based on colloquial speech, employing nuances from various local forms of the language.

He spent most of his life in Kasur, where he died at the age of 77. His poetry has been ingrained in Punjabi proverbs, qisse, and folk traditions; and has been recited at many cultural events, particularly his kafis, including one organized by UNESCO. The songs based on his lyrics have been sung on important occasions, including one at the White House. It has also brought forth many modern renditions, particularly in the form of qawwali.

== Biography ==
=== Early life and education ===
There is no consensus on Bulleh Shah's real name. While mainstream historians assert it was 'Abdullah,' some scholars argue that it was 'Bu Ali.'

Bulleh Shah was born around 1680 in Uch, Subah of Multan, in Mughal Punjab into a Sayyid family.

Bulleh Shah's father, Shah Muhammad Darwaish, was well-versed in Arabic, Persian, and the Qur'an. For unknown reasons, in his early life, his family moved to Malakwal, a village near Sahiwal. Bulleh Shah had at least one sister who was also Sufi. Both siblings never married. According to another account, he had two sisters and none of them ever married.

Later, when Bulleh Shah was six years old, his family moved to Pandoke, which is 50 miles southeast of Kasur. Bulleh Shah was schooled by his father along with the other children of the village. Most sources confirm that Bulleh Shah had to work, as a child and adolescent, as a herder in the village. It is confirmed that he received his higher education in Kasur. Some historians claim that Bulleh Shah received his education at a highly reputed madrassa run by Hafiz Ghulam Murtaza, where he taught for some time after his graduation. After his early education, he went to Lahore where he studied with Shah Inayat Qadiri, a Sufi murshid of Lahore. Bulleh Shah later became an eminent scholar of Arabic and Persian.

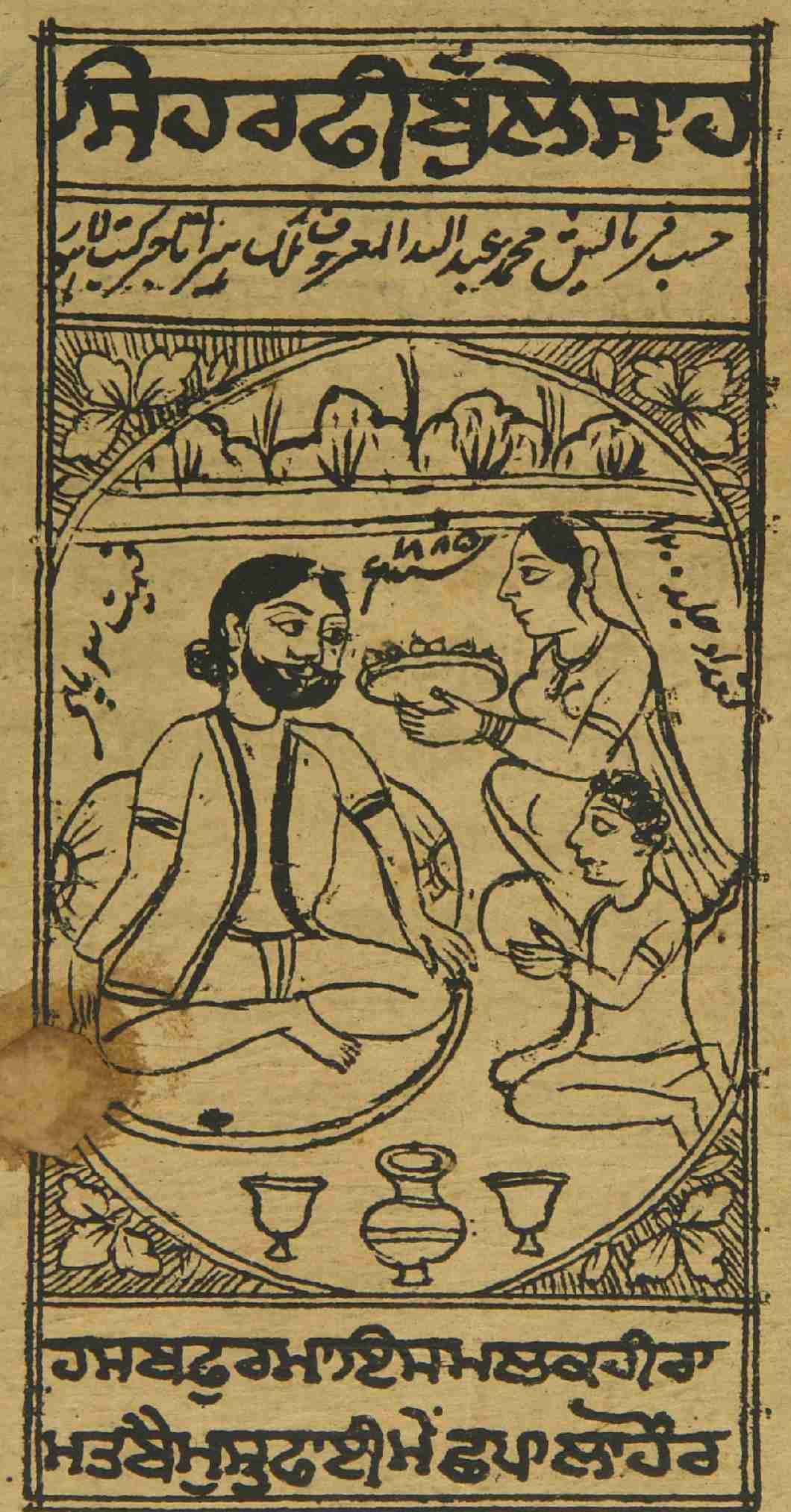
Depiction of the Punjabi Sufi poet Bulleh Shah (left), from a lithograph of 'Siharfi Bulleh Shah', circa late 19th century

By social stratum, Bulleh Shah was a peasant. He had at least one unmarried sister. Among his friends included Darshi Nath, a Hindu fakir.

One of the oldest texts to mention him is Gazetteer of the Multan District (1901–02) prepared and published by Edward Douglas MacLagan in 1902. The text identified Shah as the "best known, and it is said the first, writer of kafis." However, his kafis were published for the first time as "Qanun-i-Ishq", in 1889, by Anwar Ali in Lahore.

=== Persecution ===
There is a fort-like gurdwara in Daftuh that was built in the 18th century by the Sikh chieftainess Bibi Isher Kaur, who donated 80 squares of land for its construction. Bulleh Shah took refuge in this gurdwara after a group of Islamic fundamentalists started threatening his life.

In his bad times, when even his family looked down upon him (for accepting a lower-caste Shah Inayat Qadiri as a teacher), his sister loved him and stood with him.

During his lifetime, he was outcast as kafir (non-believer) by some Muslim clerics.

=== Death ===
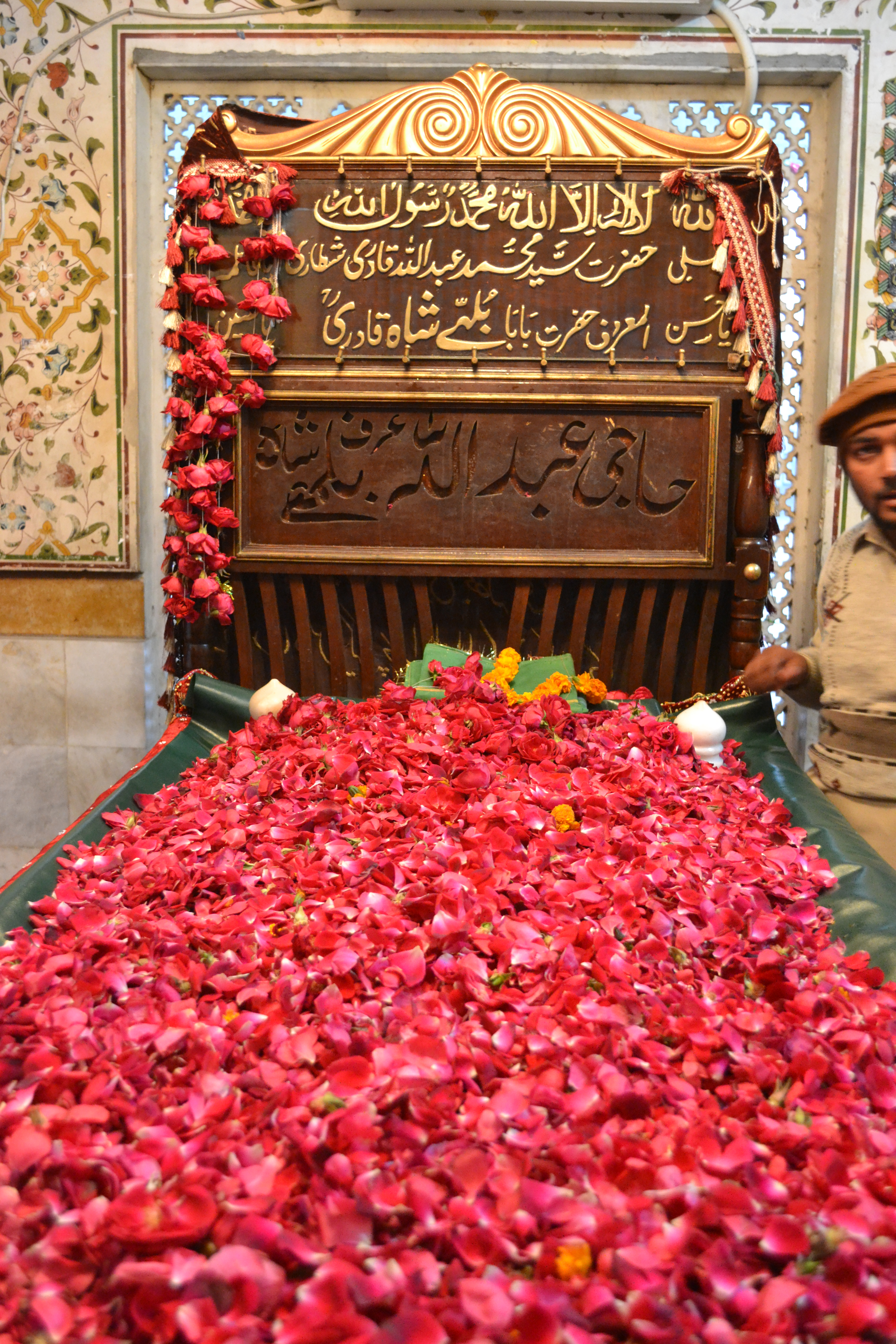
Bulleh Shah's grave in Kasur, Pakistan

He died in 1757, at the age of 77. According to Christopher Shackle, he died in 1758. He was buried in Kasur, where he had spent most of his life. As he was declared a kafir (a non-believer), religious fundamentalists of Kasur claimed it was prohibited to offer the prayer at his funeral. He was then buried on the outskirts of Kasur and his funeral prayer was led by Syed Zahid Hamdani, a renowned religious personality of Kasur.

== Poetry ==
Bulleh Shah lived five centuries after the Punjabi Sufi poet and saint Fariduddin Ganjshakar (1179–1266), and lived in the same period as other Punjabi Sufi poet Sultan Bahu (1629–1691). His lifespan also overlapped with the Punjabi poet Waris Shah (1722–1799), who is famous for Heer Ranjha, the Sindhi Sufi poet Sachal Sarmast (1739–1829), and the Pashto poet Khushal Khattak (1613–1689). Amongst Urdu poets, Bulleh Shah lived four hundred miles away from Mir Taqi Mir (1723–1810) of Delhi.

Bulleh Shah practised the Sufi tradition of Punjabi poetry established by poets like Shah Hussain (1538–1599), Sultan Bahu (1629–1691), and Shah Sharaf (1640–1724).

The verse form Bulleh Shah primarily employed is the Kafi, popular in Punjabi and Sindhi poetry. His poetry is a mixture of traditional mystic thought and intellectualism.

Many people have put his Kafis to music, from street-singers to renowned Sufi singers like Nusrat Fateh Ali Khan, Fareed Ayaz, Pathanay Khan, Abida Parveen, the Waddali Brothers, Iqbal Bahu and Sain Zahoor, from the synthesised techno qawwali remixes of UK-based Asian artists to the Pakistani rock band Junoon.

Among the most distinguished persons to be influenced by Bulleh Shah's poetry had been Muhammad Iqbal. It is maintained that Iqbal took his last breath while listening to his kafi.

He is the "most famous and celebrated" Punjabi poet and is widely recognized as "poet par excellence". A sample of his poetic work is presented below:

Verse 1:

"The mullah and the torch-bearer

Hail from the same stock;

They give light to others,

And themselves are in the dark."

Verse 2:

"Let anyone who calls me Sayyid be punished

with the tortures of hell;

And let him revel in the pleasures of heaven,

who labels me an Arain."

Verse 3:

“Not a believer in the mosque am I,

Nor a disbeliever with his rites am I.

I am not the pure amongst the impure,

I am neither Moses nor Pharaoh.”

== Philosophy and views ==
Bulleh Shah's non-orthodox views and simple language played important role in popularization of his poetry. It has been noted in literature that "one reason for his all-time popularity is his relatively modern vocabulary." Among the core tenets of his philosophy includes humanism, equality, tolerance, rejection of double standards, and defiance to the authority of Ulama and blind faith in their authority. For his criticism of replication of beliefs (blind faith and following), the "Oxford Textbook of Spirituality in Healthcare" compared Bulleh Shah with Percy Bysshe Shelley. For his "ruthless [analysis of] human society" and an "unending quest" to change it, he is often compared with Karl Marx. Among major taboos in his philosophy was reciting words without comprehending them. He was a reformer very much conscious of the contemporary religious, political and social situations.

In Bulleh Shah's poetry, Sufism can be seen as an indigenous philosophy of political activism and class struggle and resistance to powerful institutions like religion and imperialism. Through his poems he spoke against "religious, political and social patriarchal high handedness" of his time. This side of his poetry is evident from his defying of the imperial ban on dancing and singing, and support for Sikhs, in general, and Guru Tegh Bahadur and Guru Gobind Singh, in particular, in their struggle against the imperialist Mughal Empire. Thus, his version of Sufism is usually considered opposite to that of Ali Hajweri and other 'more spiritual' Sufis who were confined to their libraries and schools and rarely participated in public discourse.

Bulleh Shah was a "revolutionary" and "rebel" poet who spoke against powerful religious, political and social institutions of his time and, thus, his influence can be seen on many noted socialists, progressives and workers and women rights activists like Jam Saqi, Taimur Rahman, Bhagat Singh, Faiz Ahmad Faiz, Madeeha Gauhar, and Major Ishaque Muhammad.

Humanism is the key attribute of the life and works of Bulleh Shah.

== Modern renderings ==
=== Bands and albums ===
In the 1990s, Junoon, a rock band from Pakistan, rendered his poems "Bullah Ki Jaana" and "Aleph" ("Ilmon Bas Kareen O Yaar"). In 2004, Indian musician Rabbi Shergill turned the classical poem "Bullah Ki Jaana" into a rock/fusion song in his debut album Rabbi; the song was a chart-topper in 2005, helping the album to eventually sell over 10,000 copies and became immensely popular in India and Pakistan.

The Wadali Bandhu, a Punjabi Sufi group from India, have also released a version of "Bullah Ki Jaana" in their album Aa Mil Yaar... Call of the Beloved. They also worked with British-Punjabi music composer, Mukhtar Sahota, to create their own rendition of a famous Punjabi folk song, "Charkha" which was released in May 2007. Another version was performed by Lakhwinder Wadali and entitled "Bullah". Dama Dam Mast Qalandar, a qawwali composed in honour of Shahbaz Qalandar, has been one of Bulleh Shah's most popular poems and has been frequently rendered by many Indian, Pakistani and Bangladeshi singers including Noor Jehan, Ustad Nusrat Fateh Ali Khan, Abida Parveen, Sabri Brothers, Wadali brothers, Reshman and Runa Laila. Other qawwali songs by Bulleh Shah, include "Sade Vehre Aya Kar" and "Mera Piya Ghar Aaya". In 2008, a version of Bulleh Shah's famous verse, Aao Saiyo Ral Deyo Ni Wadhai, was sung by Shafqat Amanat Ali Khan, for his debut solo album, Tabeer. Ali named the song "Bulleh Shah" in honor of the poet.

In 2016, a collaboration between two EDM artists (Headhunterz and Skytech) named "Kundalini" used words created by Bulleh Shah, as well as having the words Bulleh Shah in the lyrics. Bulleh Shah's verses have been an inspiration to painters as well, as in the two series of paintings (Jogia Dhoop and Shah Shabad) by an Indian painter Geeta Vadhera inspired by the poetry of Bulleh Shah and other Sufi poets and saints. In 2017, British-Pakistani singer Yasir Akhtar used Bulleh Shah's poetry in his song "Araam Naal Kar – Take it Easy". In 2019, Sona Mohapatra used a verse of Bulleh Shah in her song "R.A.T. Mashup".

=== Films ===
The 1973 movie Bobby song by Narendra Chanchal starts with the verse Beshaq mandir masjid todo, Bulleh Shah ye kahta. Some of Bulleh Shah's verses, including "Tere Ishq Nachaya", have been adapted and used in Bollywood film songs including "Chaiyya Chaiyya", which featured Shah Rukh Khan, and "Thayya Thayya" in the 1998 film Dil Se.., "Tere Ishq Nachaya" in the 2002 film Shaheed-E-Azam and "Ranjha Ranjha" in the 2010 film Raavan. In a 2002 BBC poll, people from 155 countries voted "Chaiyya Chaiyya" as one of the best songs of all time, as it ranked 9th out of over 7,000 songs. The song inspired the soundtrack of the Hollywood movie Inside Man.

The 2007 Pakistani movie Khuda Kay Liye includes Bulleh Shah's poetry in the song "Bandeya Ho". The 2008 Bollywood film, A Wednesday, included a song titled "Bulle Shah, O Yaar Mere". In 2014, Ali Zafar sung some of his verses as "Chal Buleya" for Bollywood soundtrack album Total Siyapaa, and the song was reprised by Zafar same year in Pakistan Idol. The 2016 Bollywood films Sultan and Ae Dil Hai Mushkil feature the song "Bulleya", sung by Papon and Amit Mishra respectively, which is short for Bulleh Shah. Poetry of Bulleh Shah was also used in 2015 film Wedding Pullav composed by Salim–Sulaiman. A song "Hun Kis Theen" based on his poetry was also featured in Punjabi animated film Chaar Sahibzaade: Rise of Banda Singh Bahadur.

=== Coke Studio (Pakistan) ===
In 2009, the season 2 of Coke Studio featured "Aik Alif" performed by Sain Zahoor and Noori. Ali Zafar also used some of Bulleh Shah and Shah Hussain's verses in his "Dastan-e-Ishq". In 2010, the season 3 featured "Na Raindee Hai" and "Makke Gayaan Gal Mukdi Nahi" performed by Arieb Azhar. In 2012, Shah's poetry was featured with Hadiqa Kiani performing "Kamlee". In 2016, Ahmed Jahanzeb and Umair Jaswal performed "Khaki Banda"; In third episode of season 11 Fareed Ayaz, Abu Muhammad Qawal & Brothers performed a Qawwali based on Kalam by Bulleh Shah. In season 12 Hadiqa Kiani used verses of Bulleh Shah in the song "Daachi Waaleya".

== Legacy ==
=== Tomb ===
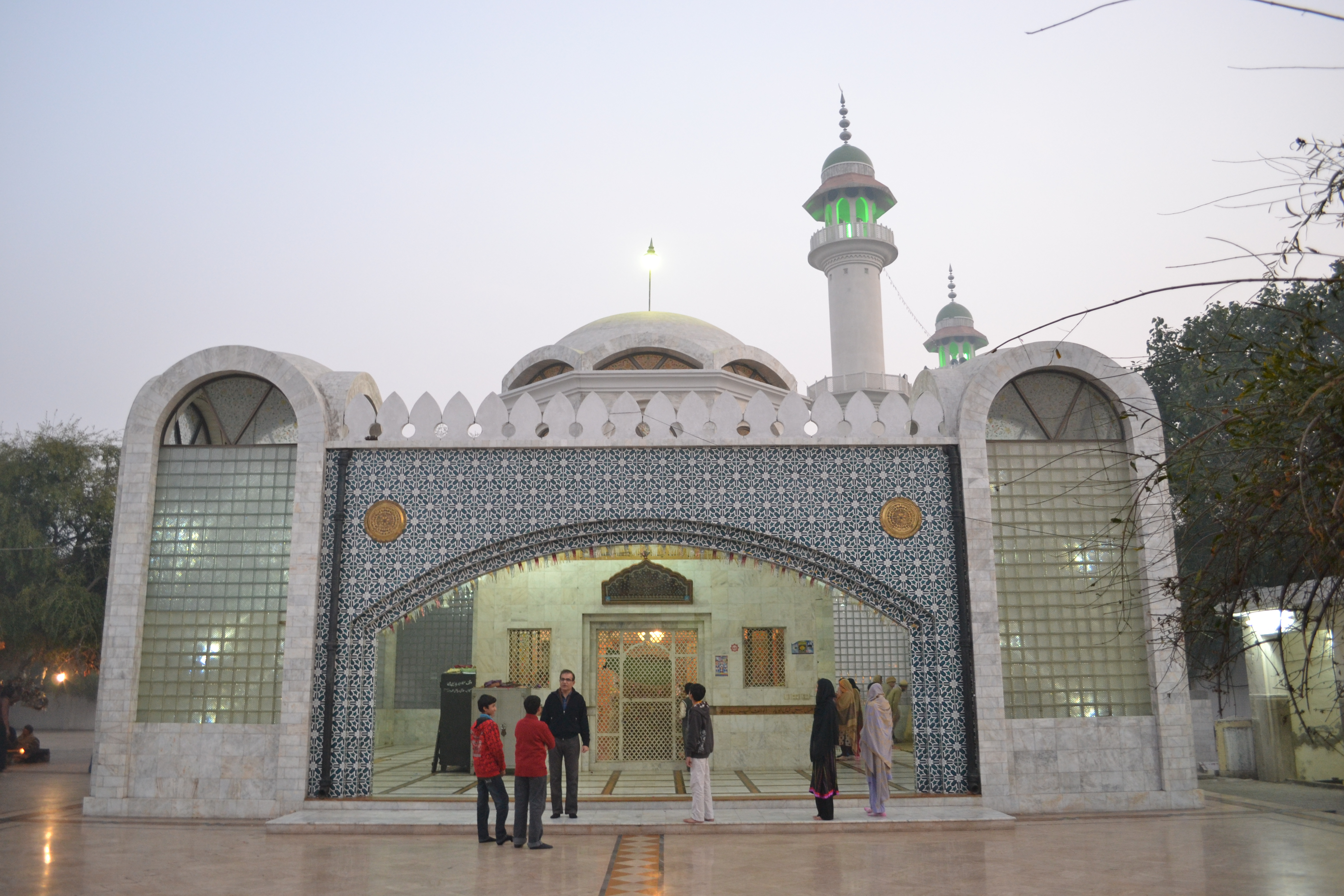
The tomb of Bulleh Shah in Kasur, Punjab, Pakistan

The grave of Bulleh Shah inside the tomb

A dargah was built over his tomb in the following decades. It is now, officially, a protected monument under regulation of the Punjab government. The tomb's premises are too small to accommodate the large number of visitors it receives each year. In 2024, due to overcrowding, the local government canceled several events and had to restrict entry to manage the overwhelming influx of people.

=== Academic and literary circles ===
The journalist Najam Sethi attempted to translate the verses of Bulleh Shah into English. However, his friend Taufiq Rafat published the finest translation of Bulleh Shah's selected poems.

The work of Bulleh Shah influenced and inspired many other poets and artists, such as Muhammad Iqbal, Faiz Ahmad Faiz, Ali Arshad Mir, and Mian Muhammad Bakhsh.

For over three decades, the Bulleh Shah Conference has been held at the saint's tomb. During the event, scholars have presented research papers on Bulleh Shah's poetry and life, while prominent politicians—such as Qamar Zaman Kaira and Chaudhry Manzoor Ahmed—have delivered speeches.

=== Socio-economics ===
In 2012, the government of Punjab, most populous province of Pakistan, renamed an important road in the provincial capital Lahore to "Bulleh Shah Road". In 2021, the government of Pakistan also approved his name for a road in the country. Pakistan's "largest renewable packaging facility" is also named after him. There is a housing community in Kasur called "Bulleh Shah Colony." Also, a road in Kasur is called "Baba Bulleh Shah Road." A roadway junction on Lahore Ring Road is called "Bulleh Shah Interchange." In 2023, a public hospital in Kasur was renamed to "Baba Bulleh Shah Hospital."

An educational institute called "Bulleh Shah Institute" is operating in Badhni Kalan, India, since 2003. Another educational institute called "Bulleh Shah Law College" (affiliated with University of the Punjab) operates in Kasur. In 2007, Pakistani senator Chaudhry Manzoor Ahmed raised the proposal for establishment of Bulleh Shah University in Kasur. In 2023, the National Assembly of Pakistan passed a bill, proposed by Asiya Azeem, for the establishment of "Bulleh Shah International University" in Kasur. In 2024, Pakistani President Asif Ali Zardari reiterated the establishment of Bulleh Shah International University in Kasur.

The renowned Pakistani businessman Syed Babar Ali mentioned Bulleh Shah in his autobiography, and the role played by his team in publishing his works.

=== Politics ===
In the 1960s and 1970s, Zulfikar Ali Bhutto exploited the rising popularity of the ideas of Bulleh Shah, and the slogan of "Roti Kapra aur Makan" (that inspired the film Roti Kapda Aur Makaan) among the common masses and emerged as a populist leader who eventually became the ninth Prime Minister of Pakistan. Bhutto used the term “Dama Dam Mast Qalandar” (a song adapted by Bulleh Shah) in 1973 to predict the political turmoil ahead.

In February 2006 then Chief Minister of Punjab Chaudhry Pervaiz Elahi addressed a conference at the University of the Punjab, in which he said, Bulleh Shah and other Sufi's "were not only preachers, but also historians of social history."

In March 2013, Hamza Shahbaz (on the behalf of Punjab's chief minister Shehbaz Sharif) inaugurated "Yadgar-e-Baba Bulleh Shah" (a memorial to Bulleh Shah) in Kasur. In 2015, in his address the Prime Minister Nawaz Sharif recited a verse of Bulleh Shah.

In 2015, the cricketer-turned-politician Imran Khan (former Prime Minister) called Bulleh Shah "the great Sufi inspirational heritage of our region."

In August 2023, the caretaker chief minister of Punjab Mohsin Raza Naqvi laid the foundation stone of the extension project of the dargah of Bulleh Shah. He said, the teachings of Bulleh Shah are "an enlightening as well as an illuminating chapter for us." Among the attendees were Nayyar Ali Dada.

Aseff Ahmad Daula, former Minister of Foreign Affairs of Pakistan, was an admirer of Bulleh Shah. In one of his essays, he equated "Punjabi" with the language of Bulleh Shah. Another Foreign Minister Khurshid Mahmud Kasuri praised Bulleh Shah for "always projecting truth in his verses."

In January 2026, a shrine dedicated to Bulleh Shah in Uttarakhand was vandalised by an estimated group of 25 to 30 people. The group Hindu Raksha Dal has claimed responsibility.

== Works ==
Bulleh Shah never published his works. However, a significant part of his work has been preserved and published formally in India, Pakistan and abroad. The following is a list of books and book chapters containing his poetic works (or its translation).

Works in English:

- Sufi Lyrics: Selections from a World Classic (Publisher: Harvard University Press), 2021. English Translation by: Christopher Shackle.
- Bulleh Shah: A Selection (Publisher: Oxford University Press), 2016. English Translation by: Taufiq Rafat.
- Baba Bulleh Shah (in Islamic Mystical Poetry: Sufi Verse from the Mystics to Rumi) (Publisher: Penguin Books), 2009. Author: Mahmood Jamal.
- Bulhe Shah: Volume 141 (Publisher: Sahitya Akademi), 1987 (reprinted in 1990). Author: Surindar Singh Kohli.
- Bulleh Shah: The Love-intoxicated Iconoclast (Publisher: Radha Soami Satsang Beas), 1986. Authors: J. R. Puri and T. R. Shangari

Works in Gurmukhi (Punjabi):

- Bulleh Shah Jeevan Te Rachna [The Life and Career of Bulleh Shah] (Publisher: Punjabi University, Patiala, India), 2010. Editor: Jeet Singh Sital.
- Kalam Bulle Shah [The Verses of Bulleh Shah], 2009. Editor: Gurdev Singh.
- Bulleh Shah: A Sufi Poet [Collection of Verses], Oxford University Press, 2010. Edited by Shabnam Virmani.

Works in Shahmukhi (Punjabi):

- Kalam Hazrat Baba Bulleh Shah [The Verses of Saint Bulleh Shah] (Publisher: Karmanwala Book Shop), 2009. Editor: Sami Ullah Barkat.
- Bulleh Shah Kehende Nain [Bulleh Shah says], 1987. Editor: Maqbool Anwar Dawoodi.

Works in Urdu:

- Sayin Bulleh Shah [Master Bulleh Shah] (Publisher: Radha Soami Satsang Beas), 2000. Authors: T. R. Shangari and J.R. Puri.
- Bulleh Shah (Publisher: Sahitya Akademi), 1992. Author: Surinder Singh Kolhi. Translator: Kamil Qureshi.
- Tazkara [Discussion], 1984. Author: Mian Akhlaq Ahmad.
- Kulliyat Bulleh Shah (Publisher: Zahid Basheer Printers, Lahore). Editor: Faqir Muhammad Faqir.
- Ramooz e Irfan: Kafyan Hazrat Bulleh Shah [Secrets of Sainthood: The Kafis of Saint Bulleh Shah] (Publisher: Kashmir Research Institute, Srinagar). Translator: Fiza Jokalwai.

Work in Sindhi:

- Bulleh Shah Joon Kafiyoon [The Kafis of Bulleh Shah], 1983. Editor: Noor Haider.

Works in Hindi:

- Sai Bulle Shah Radha Swami Satsang Vyas (Publisher: Radha Soami Satsang Beas), 1995.
- Kafian Baba Bulleh Shah [The Kafis of Bulleh Shah] (Publisher: Sri Satguru Jagjit Singh Ji eLibrary/ Namdhari eLibrary).

Other works:

"Dama Dam Mast Qalandar" is one of the most famous Sufi songs in India and Pakistan. It was originally written by Amir Khusrau, and was modified by Bulleh Shah. The version composed by Bulleh Shah was sung by Nusrat Fateh Ali Khan, Abida Parveen, Laal (band) and numerous other singers from India and Pakistan.

"Tere ishq Nachaya," a popular poem by Bulleh Shah, has been sung numerous times both in public and film industry, e.g., the popular song Chaiyya Chaiyya is derived from its lyrics.

"Bullah Ki Jaana," one of the most popular poems by Bulleh Shah, has been sung by numerous singers in India and Pakistan.

A brief biographical sketches of him are found in "Encyclopaedia of Untouchables : Ancient Medieval and Modern" (2008) and "Encyclopaedia of Indian Literature" (1987).

== See also ==
- List of Punjabi language poets
- Tere ishq Nachaya
- Chaiyya Chaiyya
- Bullah Ki Jaana
