= MTV Unplugged (Indian TV program) =

Indian music television program

- Country of origin: India
- No. of seasons: 8

Production
- Production location: Mumbai, India
- Running time: 1 hour

Original release
- Network: MTV India
- Release: 1 October 2011 – 16 March 2019

MTV Unplugged is an Indian music television program showcasing musical artists, generally playing their works on acoustic instruments. The songs featured on the program are usually those released earlier by the artists.

== Season 1 ==
This season had ten episodes, which officially aired on 1 October 2011. All the artists featured their own songs, which were released earlier.

The vocalists / singers backing the Main Artists across all 10 episodes of MYV Season 1 were Shannon Donald, (Dr.)Josemund Menezes, Alan DeSouza and Murishka D’cruz.

=== Episode 1 (1 October 2011) ===
Rabbi Shergill

- Bullah Ki Jaana
- Bilqis
- Heer
- Challa
- Ganga
- Tere Bin
- Jugni

=== Episode 2 (8 October 2011) ===
Mohit Chauhan

- Masakali
- Mai Ni Meriye
- Ganga Nahaley
- Guncha Koi
- Dooba Dooba
- Babaji
- Tumse Hi

=== Episode 3 (15 October 2011) ===
Indian Ocean

- Bandeh
- Kandisa
- Ma Rewa
- Melancholic Ecstasy
- Nam Myo Ho
- Shunya

=== Episode 4 (22 October 2011) ===
Rekha Bhardwaj

- Tere Ishq Mein
- Genda Phool
- Tere Bin Nahi Lagda
- Madaniya
- Ab Mujhe Koi
- Ranjha Ranjha

=== Episode 5 (29 October 2011) ===
Susheela Raman

- Raise Up
- Yeh Mera Deewanapan
- Muthu Kumar
- Ennapane
- Sakhi Maaro (feat. Kutle Khan)
- Paal
- Magdalene

=== Episode 6 (5 November 2011) ===
Shilpa Rao

- Nain Parindey
- Javeda Zindagi (feat. Keerthi Sagathia)
- Mudi Mudi
- Dhol Yaara Dhol
- I Feel Good

=== Episode 7 (12 November 2011) ===
Advaita

- Silent Sea
- Hamsadhwani
- Gorakh
- Miliha
- Just Enough
- Durga
- Gates Of Dawn

=== Episode 8 (19 November 2011) ===
Euphoria

- Tum
- Ab Na Jaa
- Mehfuz
- Maaeri
- C U Later
- Dhoom Pichuck
- Item

=== Episode 9 (26 November 2011) ===
Javed Ali

- Aaja O Meri Tamanna
- Maula Maula
- Ek Din Teri Raahon Mein
- Pukarta Chala Hoon Main
- Hai Guzarish
- Barsan Lagi

=== Episode 10 (3 December 2011) ===
Ranjit Barot

- Vande Mataram (feat. Kutle Khan)
- Shloka
- Sabah Pathiki
- Zindagi
- Maula Mere (feat. Roop Kumar Rathod)
- Night Song

== Season 2 ==
The show officially aired on 3 November 2012. Its promos were released about one & half months ago on YouTube and the MTV official website.

=== Episode 1 (3 November 2012) ===
A.R. Rahman

- Ye Jo Des Hai Tera
- Rehna Tu
- Phir Se Udd Chala (feat. Arun H.K.)
- Tu Bole (feat. Neeti Mohan)
- Nenjukulle (feat. Shakthisree Gopalan)
- Aaj Jaane Ki Zid Na Karo
- Dil Se Re

=== Episode 2 (10 November 2012) ===
Shafqat Amanat Ali

- Aankhon Ke Saagar
- Yeh Hausla
- Aavo Saiyon
- Manmaniyan
- Mora Saiyaan
- Kyun Main Jaagoon

=== Episode 3 (17 November 2012) ===
Sunidhi Chauhan

- Udi
- Mar Jaaiyaan
- Yaariyaan
- Kyun
- Tu
- Neeyat

=== Episode 4 (24 November 2012) ===
Indus Creed

- Trapped
- Cry
- Fireflies
- Take It Harder
- Bulletproof
- Pretty Child

=== Episode 5 (1 December 2012) ===
Kailasa

- Teri Deewani
- Daaro Na Rang
- Albeliya
- Tu Jaane Na
- Katha Gaan
- Saiyaan

=== Episode 6 (8 December 2012) ===
Ash King

- Te Amo
- I Love You
- Dil Gira Dafatan
- Love Is Blind
- Auntyji
- Kaise

=== Episode 7 (15 December 2012) ===
Lucky Ali

- Tu Kaun Hai
- Sunoh
- O Sanam
- Tere Mere Saath
- Saiyaah
- Maut

=== Episode 8 (22 December 2012) ===
Agnee

- Aahatein
- Kaarwaan
- Saadho Re
- Ranjhan Yaar Di
- Thumri
- Dukki Tikki

=== Episode 9 (29 December 2012) ===
Multi-Artists

- Pani Da Rang – Ayushmann Khurrana
- Pareshaan – Shalmali Kholgade
- Raabta – Arijit Singh
- Yahi Meri Zindagi – Aditi Singh Sharma
- Jiya Re – Neeti Mohan
- Ishq Sufiyaana – Kamal Khan

== Season 3 ==
This season aired from 23 November 2013.

=== Episode 1 (23 November 2013) ===
Sonu Nigam

- Abhi Mujh Mein Kahin
- Cham Cham
- Satrangi Re
- Tanhayee
- Crazy Dil
- Kal Ho Na Ho

=== Episode 2 (30 November 2013) ===
Farhan Akhtar

- Tum Ho Toh
- Pichhle Saat Dino Mein
- Senorita
- Rock On
- Main Aisa Kyun Hoon
- Dil Chahta Hai

=== Episode 3 (7 December 2013) ===
Mika Singh

- Subah Hone Na De
- Singh Is King
- Saajna
- Agal Bagal
- Pungi
- Sawan Mein Lag Gayi Aag

=== Episode 4 (14 December 2013) ===
Arijit Singh

- Duaa
- Phir Mohabbat
- Ilahi
- Phir Le Aya Dil
- Kabira
- Tum Hi Ho

=== Episode 5 (21 December 2013) ===
Benny Dayal

- Tarkeebein
- Medley
- Ek Main Hu Aur Ek Tu
- Badtameez Dil
- Daaru Desi
- Kaise Mujhe Tu
- Omana Penne

=== Episode 6 (28 December 2013) ===
Pentagram

- Nocturne
- Voice
- Tomorrow's Decided
- Must I
- Ignorant One
- Human Failings
- Drive

=== Episode 7 (4 January 2014) ===
The Raghu Dixit Project

- Lokada Kalaji
- Yaadon Ki Kyaari
- Jag Changa
- Hey Bhagwan
- Gud Gudiya
- Mysore Se Aayi

=== Episode 8 (11 January 2014) ===
K.K.

- Yaaron
- Pal
- Don 2
- O Meri Jaan
- Beetein Lamhein
- Tadap Tadap

== Season 4 ==
The fourth season aired from 22 November 2014.

=== Episode 1 (22 November 2014) ===
Amit Trivedi

- Pardesi
- Zinda
- Nayan Tarse
- Badra Bahar
- Manjha
- Haan Reham
- Ek Lau
- Iktara (feat. Kavita Seth)

=== Episode 2 (29 November 2014) ===
Salim–Sulaiman

- Ali Maula
- Ishq Wala Love
- Aashayein
- Kurbaan Hua
- Shukran Allah
- Ainvayi Ainvayi (feat. Sunidhi Chauhan)
- Tumko Nahi Chhodungi (feat. Sunidhi Chauhan)

=== Episode 3 (6 December 2014) ===
Papon

- Baarish ki Boondein
- Ranjish hi sahi
- Yeh Mojeza
- Boitha Maro
- Kaun Mera
- Kyun
- Jiyein Kyun

=== Episode 4 (13 December 2014) ===
Mithoon

- Tum Hi Ho (instrumental)
- Baarish (feat. Mohammad Irfan Ali)
- Banjaara (feat. Mohammad Irfan Ali)
- Ankhein Teri
- Humdard (feat. Palak Muchhal)

=== Episode 5 (20 December 2014) ===
Mikey McCleary

- Khoya Khoya Chaand (feat. Shalmali Kholgade)
- Kabhi Kabhi Mere Dil Mein (feat. Shalmali Kholgade)
- Dhak Dhak (feat. Rachel Varghese)
- Tum Itna Jo Muskura rahe ho(feat. Rachel Varghese)
- Little Things
- The World is our Playground
- Dama Dum Mast Kalandar ( feat. Sonu Kakkar)

=== Episode 6 (27 December 2014) ===
Ankit Tiwari

- Dil Darbadar
- Sun Raha Hai Na Tu
- Galliyan
- Sheeshe Ka Samundar
- Tu Mera dil Tu Meri Jaan
- Kuch Toh hua hai

=== Episode 7 (3 January 2015) ===
Sachin–Jigar

- Saibo (feat. Tochi Raina and Priya Panchal)
- Shake your Bootiyas (feat. Divya Kumar)
- Bezubaan (feat. Priya Saraiya)
- Gulabi (feat. Shruti Pathak)
- Babaji Ki Booti

== Season 5 ==
The fifth season started from 2 January 2016.

=== Episode 1 (2 January 2016) ===
Hariharan

- Tu Hi Re
- Roja Janeman
- Kaash Aisa
- Jhonka Hawa Ka Aaj Bhi
- Dheemi Dheemi
- Sakhi Re Kahe

=== Episode 2 (9 January 2016) ===
Jeet Gannguli

- Muskurane Ki Wajah (feat. Jake Charkey on Cello)
- Khamoshiyan (feat. Bhaven Dhanak and Jake Charkey on Cello)
- Milne Hai Mujhse Aayi (feat. Jubin Nautiyal)
- Suno Na Sangemarmar
- Hamari Adhuri Kahani
- Chaahun Main Ya Naa (feat. Chinmayi Sripada and Jake Charkey on Cello)

=== Episode 3 (16 January 2016) ===
Sukhwinder Singh

- Ramta Jogi
- Jai Ho
- Bismil
- Chaiyya Chaiyya
- Aatish Para
- Kawa Kawa

=== Episode 4 (23 January 2016) ===
Multi-Artists

- Moh Moh Ke Dhaage – Papon
- Humnava – Papon
- Pehli Baar – Siddharth Mahadevan
- Mitti Di Khushboo – Ayushmann Khurrana
- Yahin Hoon Main – Ayushmann Khurrana
- Hasi – Ami Mishra

=== Episode 5 (30 January 2016) ===
Swarathma

- Topiwalleh
- Ee Bhoomi
- Naane Daari
- Yeshu Allah Aur Krishna
- Sur Mera
- Pyaar Ke Rang
- Pyaasi

=== Episode 6 (6 February 2016) ===
Rahat Fateh Ali Khan

- "Samjhawan Ki"
- "Main Jahaan Rahoon"
- "Tumhe Dillagi"
- "Ankhiya Udeeka Diya"
- "O Re Piya"
- "Saanso Ki Mala"
- "Mann Kunto Maula"
- "Mast Kalandar"
- "Charka Nau Laga"
- "Halka Halka"

=== Episode 7 (13 February 2016) ===
Pritam

- Barfi
- Aaj Din Chadheya (feat. Harshdeep Kaur, Irshad Kamil and Jake Charkey on Cello)
- Tu Jo Mila (feat. Javed Ali)
- Kamli (feat. Shilpa Rao and Javed Ali)
- Afghan Jalebi (feat. Nakash Aziz)

== Season 6 ==
The sixth season started from 14 January 2017.

=== Episode 1 (14 January 2017) ===
A. R. Rahman

- Ranjha Ranjha (feat. Shruti Haasan)
- Mann Chandra
- Enna Sona
- Tu Hai (feat. Sanah Moidutty)
- Urvasi Urvasi (feat. Ranjit Barot and Suresh Peters)
- Aise Na Dekho (feat. Rianjali)

=== Episode 2 (21 January 2017) ===
Shreya Ghoshal

- Sunn Raha Hai (Sufi Version)
- Mohe Rang Do Laal
- Rasm-e-Ulfat
- Leja Leja Re
- Agar Tum Mil Jao
- Deewani Mastani

=== Episode 3 (28 January 2017) ===
Neeti Mohan and Benny Dayal

- Tune Maari Entriyaan
- Sau Aasmaan
- Sapna Jahan
- Dhadaam Dhadaam
- Locha-E-Ulfat
- Bang Bang

=== Episode 4 (4 February 2017) ===
Sachin–Jigar

- Mileya Mileya
- Chunar
- Jeena Jeena
- Sun Sathiya (feat. Priya Saraiya)
- Saibo
- Beat Pe Booty
- G-Phad Ke

=== Episode 5 (11 February 2017) ===
The Fusion of Stars- Divya Kumar, Amit Mishra, Jasleen Royal, Siddharth Mahadevan, Shahid Mallya, Jubin Nautiyal

- Jee Karda- Divya Kumar
- Bulleya- Amit Mishra
- Preet- Jasleen Royal
- Nachde Ne Saare- Jasleen Royal and Siddharth Mahadevan
- Ikk Kudi- Shahid Mallya
- Ae Dil Hai Mushkil- Jubin Nautiyal

=== Episode 5.1 (18 February 2017) ===
The Best Of MTV Unplugged Season 6

=== Episode 6 (25 February 2017) ===
Amit Trivedi

- Pashmina
- Aahatein (feat. Karthik)
- Gubbare
- Da Da Dasse (feat. Kanika Kapoor)
- Ud-Daa Punjab
- Shubharambh (feat. Divya Kumar and Yashita Sharma)
- London Thumakada (feat. Divya Kumar)
- Love You Zindagi (feat. Jonita Gandhi)

== Season 7 ==
The seventh season started on 9 December 2017

=== Episode 1 (9 December 2017) ===
Vishal Bhardwaj

- Paani Paani re
- Pehli baar mohabbat
- Dil toh baccha hai ji
- Chhod aaye hum
- Dil ka Mizaaj Ishqiya (feat Rekha Bhardwaj)
- Naina (feat Rashid Khan and Saaskia on Cello)
- Hamari Atariya (feat Rekha Bhardwaj and Rashid Khan)

=== Episode 2 (16 December 2017) ===
Shankar Mahadevan & Sons

- Aave Re Hitchki
- Sapnon Se Bhare Naina
- Bhaag Milkha Bhaag (Siddharth Mahadevan)
- Babu Samjho Ishare & Slow Motion Angreza
- Senorita (feat Vivienne Pocha)
- Mast Magan & Tere Naina (Shivam Mahadevan)

=== Episode 3 (23 December 2017) ===
Armaan and Amaal Malik

- Buddhu Sa Mann
- Tere Mere
- Bol Do Na Zara (feat. Jake Charkey on Cello and Jonathan Paul on Piano)
- Sab Tera
- Roke Na Ruke Naina
- Kaun Tujhe
- Main Hoon Hero Tera (feat. Jake Charkey on Cello and Jonathan Paul on Piano)
- Main Rahoon Ya Na Rahoon

=== Episode 4 (30 December 2017) ===
Best Of MTV Unplugged 2017

- Tere Mere (Armaan and Amaal Malik)
- Humri Atariya (Vishal Bhardwaj feat Rekha Bhardwaj and Rashid Khan)
- Aave Re Hitchki (Shankar Mahadevan)
- Naina (Vishal Bhardwaj feat Rashid Khan and Saaskia on Cello)
- Babu Samjho Ishare & Slow Motion Angreza (Shankar Mahadevan & Sons)
- Buddhu Sa Mann (Armaan and Amaal Malik)

=== Episode 5 (6 January 2018) ===
Multi Artist

- Khalbali – (Nakash Aziz)
- Kahaani – (Sunny MR and Shashwat Singh)
- Agar Tum – (Shalmali Kholgade and Shashwat Singh)
- Beech Beech Mein – (Shalmali Kholgade)
- Humsafar Medley – (Madhaniya Akhil Sachedeve)
- Rab Da Banda – (Ahen)

=== Episode 6 (13 January 2018) ===
Monali Thakur

- Khwab Dekhe
- Sawar Loon
- Anjana Anjani
- Khol De Baheein
- Salona Sa Sajan
- Moh Moh Ke

=== Episode 7 (20 January 2018) ===
Farhan Akhtar

Manzar Naya

Ahista Ahista

Yaari (with Rochak Kohli)

Ek Ladki Bheegi Bhaagi Si

Gallan Goodiyaan (with Shannon)

Maston Ka Jhund

=== Episode 8 (27 January 2018) ===
Papon

- Tum Itna Jo
- Koi Paas Aaya
- Aaj Jaane Ki Zid Na Karo
- Meri Tanhaiyoon
- Mohabbat Karne Wale
- Bulleya

=== Episode 9 ===
Multi Artist

- Hawayein – Tushar
- Home Parinda – Nikhita Gandhi & Jaggi
- Naina – Dhvani Bhanushali
- Yeh Fitoor Mera – Amit Mishra And Tushar
- Galti Se Mistake – Amit Misra

== Season 8 ==
=== Episode 1 (26 January 2019) ===
Guru Randhawa

- Ban Ja Tu Meri Rani
- Lahore
- Patola
- Yaar Mod Do
- Sajan Rus Jave Tan

=== Episode 2 (2 February 2019) ===
Sonu Nigam (Ghazal Special)

- Apni Tasveer
- Aye Zindagi
- Khuli Jo Aankh
- Koi Yeh Kaise
- Awargi

=== Episode 3 (9 February 2019) ===
Neha Kakkar, Tony Kakkar, Sonu Kakkar

- Mile Ho
- Oh Humsa
- Waada
- Sun Charkhe Di
- Yeh Kasoor
- Coca Cola Tu
- Story Of Kakkars

=== Episode 4 (16 February 2019) ===
Multi artist

- Lamberghini (Dhvani Bhanushali)
- Chori Chori (Neeti Mohan)
- Yaara Seeli Seeli (Neeti Mohan)
- O Meri Laila (Amit Mishra)
- Guncha Koi (Bhuvan Bam)
- Gilehriyaan (Jonita Gandhi)
- Daryaa (Shahid Mallya)
- Aaya Na Tu (Arjun Kanungo)

=== Episode 5 (23 February 2019) ===
Best of MTV Unplugged Season 8

=== Episode 6 (2 March 2019) ===
Rekha Bhardwaj

- Mileya Mileya
- Main Tenu Phir Milangi
- Maahi Ve
- Judaai
- Dil Hoom Hoom Kare
- Darling

=== Episode 7 (9 March 2019) ===
Diljit Dosanjh

- Kaali Teri Gutt
- Jind Mahi
- Offline
- Ray Ban
- Jimmy Choo

=== Episode 8 (16 March 2019) ===
Sachin–Jigar

- Nazar
- Kho Diya
- Kamariya
- Hoor
- Haareya
- Afeemi
