= Mera Piya Ghar Aaya =

Song
- Written: Baba Bulleh Shah

Mera Piya Ghar Aaya (Punjabi: میرا پیا گھر آیا) is a Punjabi Sufi poem written by noted 18th-century Sufi saint and poet Baba Bulleh Shah. He composed this poem at the return of his Murshid Shah Inayat Qadiri. It has been a fixture in the repertoire of several noted Qawwali exponents. It is one of the best known Qawwalis of Nusrat Fateh Ali Khan and part of his album, Qawwali: The Essential Collection. A popular Bollywood song is derived from it and copies the main rhyming couplet and in the picturization features Indian actress Madhuri Dixit.

The song has been performed by many notable artists, such as Nusrat Fateh Ali Khan, Mamta Joshi, the Sabri Brothers, Qawwal Bahauddin Khan, Rahat Fateh Ali Khan, Badar Miandad, Sher Miandad Qawwal, and Fareed Ayaz.

== English translation ==
“Mera Piya Ghar Aaya” means “My beloved has come home.” In a more natural English feel, it can mean “My lover has returned home” or “My beloved is here.” In Sufi interpretation, the “beloved” can refer not only to a human lover but also to the spiritual master or divine presence.
