= Wajood =

Wajood or Wujood (lit. 'existence') may refer to:

- Wujud, an Arabic term meaning "existence" in Islam and Sufism
  - Wahdat al-wujūd, the doctrine of monism in Islam and Sufism
- Wajood (1998 film), an Indian Hindi-language drama by N. Chandra
- Wajood (2018 film), a Pakistani Urdu-language revenge thriller by Jawed Sheikh
