= Kamaru =

Kamaru may be,

== Language ==
- Kamaru language, Indonesia
- Kamurú language, Brazil

== People ==
- Joseph Kamaru
- Norman Kamaru
- Kamaru Usman
