= Lakhwinder Wadali =

Indian musician and singer

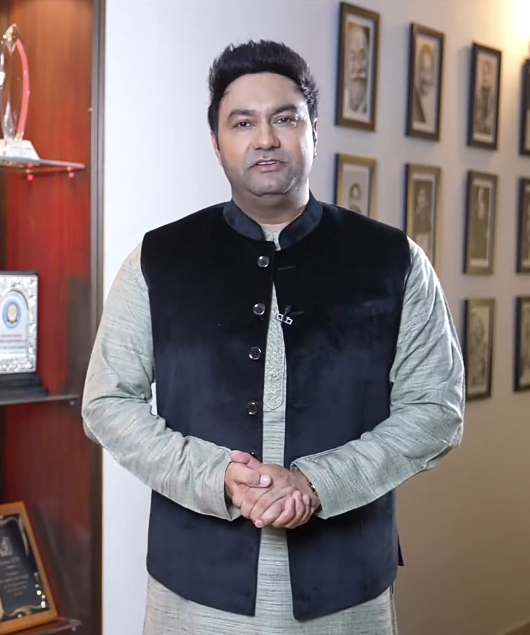
- Wadali in 2021

Background information
- Born: Lakhwinder Singh Wadali; Amritsar, Punjab, India
- Origin: Indian
- Genres: Punjabi; Sufi music; Romantic; Folk; Bhangra
- Labels: Wadali Music; Human Music; Moviebox Record; T-Series; Speed Record

Lakhwinder Wadali is an Indian musician and singer, who hails from a family of musicians from Punjab, India. His grandfather Thakur Dass Wadali was a renowned vocalist and his father and uncle formed a Sufi qawwali duo, the Wadali brothers. Lakhwinder received extensive training and guidance in classical music from his father Puran Chand Wadali. His songs blend classical and current trends in music. His repertoire includes renditions of Sufi Saints, romantic, Folk numbers, ghazals, bhajans and bhangra. Alaaps and taans are the vital aspects of his music.

His albums include Unpredictable (2007), featuring Mukhtar Sahota, and Naina De Buhe.

== Discography ==
- 2021: ‘’Rabb Manneya’’ (Koi Jaane Na)
- 2017: Glow Away In Tokyo (Music By: Tru-Skool) (MovieBox/Speed Records)
- 2014: Ranjhanna (Wadali Music)
- 2013: Ishqe Daa Jaam (Speed Records)
- 2011: Naina De Buhe (Speed Records)
- 2007: Unpredictable (Internalmusic)
- 2004: Bulla (Music Waves)
- 2002: Baba Jabbal
- 2015: Laggian Zora Zori (Music By: Aar Bee)
- 2018: Tappe 2 (Music By: Aar Bee)
- 2018: Rangi Gayi (Lakhwinder Wadali) (Music By: Aar Bee)
- 2018: Kangana (Lakhwinder Wadali) (Music By: Aar Bee)
- 2018: Raam (Lakhwinder Wadali) (Music By: Aar Bee)
- 2018: Balma (Lakhwinder Wadali) (Music By: Aar Bee)
- 2020: Sohni Kande Te (Lakhwinder Wadali) (Music By: Aar Bee)
- 2022: Mahiya (The Wadalis) (Music By: Aar Bee) (Speed Records)
- 2021: Jinde (Lakhwinder Wadali) (Music By: Aar Bee)
- 2020: Ho Jaave Je Pyar (Lakhwinder Wadali) (Music By: Aar Bee)
- 2021: Nazaara (Ustad Puran Chand Wadali, Lakhwinder Wadali) (Music By: Aar Bee)
- 2020: Ranjha Palle Paade (Lakhwinder Wadali) (Music By: Aar Bee)
- 2021: Sahi Sahi (Lakhwinder Wadali) (Music & Composer By: Aar Bee) (Zee Music Originals)
- 2020: Gulabi (Lakhwinder Wadali) (Music By: Aar Bee)
- 2017: Apna Pyara (Lakhwinder Wadali) (Music By: Aar Bee)
- 2019: Kulli (Lakhwinder Wadali) (Music By: Aar Bee)
- 2020: Maula (Ustad Puran Chand Wadali, Lakhwinder Wadali) (Music By: Aar Bee)
- 2024: Nasha (Lakhwinder Wadali) (Lyrics By: M.S. Abid)

== Filmography ==
- 2014: Sheesha Yaar Da (With Sarbjit Cheema)
- 2010: Chhevan Dariya
- 2009: Akhiyan Udeekdiyan
