= Tere ishq Nachaya =

"Tere Ishq Nachaya"

Single
- Genre: Kafi
- Songwriter: Bulleh Shah

Tere Ishq Nachaya (Punjabi: تیرے عشق نچایا, translation: Your love made me dance) is a Punjabi Sufi song composed by 18th-century mystic-poet Baba Bulleh Shah. It is a popular song performed by Sufi and qawwali singers, including Abida Parveen and also featured in Sufi music album, Sufi –Ishq Bada Bedardi (RPG Saregama) .

It has also been performed by Punjabi folk singer Jasbir Jassi and pop rock band, Jal, who also performed it on episode 1 of Coke Studio in 2011.

This song inspired the 1998 cult-classical hit "Chaiyya Chaiyya", which was written by Gulzar, composed by A. R. Rahman and sung by Sukhwinder Singh and Sapna Awasthi for the soundtrack of Mani Ratnam's Dil Se.

In the early 2000s, Shoaib Mansoor directed a very popular variant of this song called "Supreme Ishq" which was sung by Riaz Ali Qadri.
