= Hafiz Ghulam Murtaza =

17th-century Sufi saint and scholar from India

Pir Punjab
- Died: Kasur, Punjab (Now, Punjab, Pakistan)
- Major shrine: Kasur, Punjab, Pakistan
- Influences: Sheikh Abdul-Qadir Gilani, Moinuddin Chishti
- Influenced: Bulleh Shah, Waris Shah
- Tradition or genre: Qadiri-Chishti order of Sufis

Hafiz Ghulam Murtaza was a 17th-century Sufi saint and scholar of the Qadiri-Chishti Sufi order, living in Kasur, Punjab. He was also the teacher of the poets Bulleh Shah and Waris Shah. He was the Imam (main spiritual head) of the city of Kasur during its time as being one of the main centres of higher level Islamic learning in the Indian Subcontinent.

== Life ==
Hafiz Ghulam Murtaza was born into a Syed family of scholars and Sufi saints tracing its lineage back to Muhammad through both of his grandsons, Hasan and Husayn. Among his ancestors is one of the most notable Sufi saints, the founder of the Qadiri Sufi Order, Abdul-Qadir Gilani.

His father Khawaja Syed Abdul Malik was also an eminent scholar in his own right, and taught his son much from a young age.

Ghulam Murtaza headed the madrassa Jamia Kot Androon, which was the main institution of Kasur. It was here where he taught the likes of Bulleh Shah and Waris Shah, who both came to Kasur specifically to be under his tutelage as he was a well-known and famed teacher of Islamic knowledge in both Arabic and Persian.

Waris Shah had a great deal of reverence for his teacher, and it is well noted in his epic Heer Ranjha in which he states "Waris Shah is proud of being the pupil of great Makhdum, the Kasur's symbol" When Waris Shah came to Ghulam Murtaza to present his epic Heer Ranjha and gain blessings from his spiritual teacher, Ghulam Murtaza is alleged to have said "I taught Bulleh Shah and he danced and sang playing a violin. I taught you and you wrote a love story". However, once having heard sections from the Heer from Waris Shah himself, Ghulam Murtaza is said to have been consoled and blessed Waris with a powerful remark, "You have strung priceless pearls into a rope".
