= Qawwali =

Sufi devotional music from South Asia

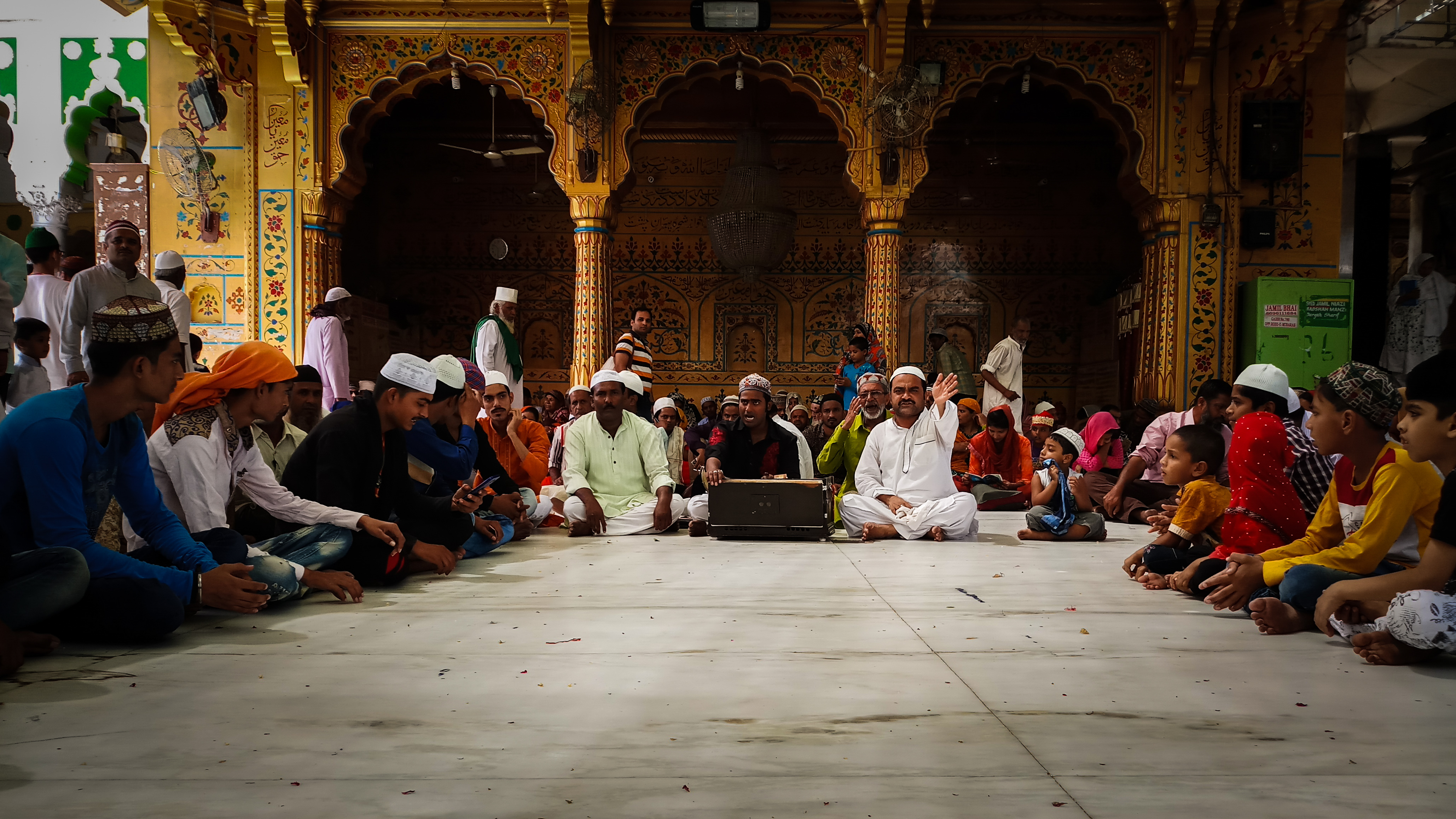
Qawwali at Ajmer Sharif Dargah, Rajasthan, India

Qawwali is a form of Sufi Islamic devotional singing that originated in South Asia. Traditionally performed at Sufi shrines (dargahs) across the Indian subcontinent as part of spiritual gatherings, qawwali aims to invoke divine remembrance (dhikr), induce spiritual ecstasy (wajd), and draw the listener closer to Allah (God). Qawwali remains widely popular throughout Pakistan, India, and Bangladesh. Although qawwali has gained mainstream popularity since the late 20th century, its core remains rooted in Islamic mysticism (Sufism). Hindavi poet Amir Khusrau based the Qawwali on the Indian raga, with the musician singing "within the framework of the raga." As such, Qawwali is the result of "the Muslim-Hindu musical confluence that hybridized musical traditions in North India to various degrees over a millennium". Qawwali has had a long tradition of being sung a cappella, though several Indian musical instruments came to be incorporated, as well as those from outside the Indian subcontinent.

Hereditary qawwali performers continue to uphold the tradition in devotional settings, but the genre reached a global audience largely through the work of Nusrat Fateh Ali Khan, Aziz Mian, and the Sabri Brothers. Recordings by Nusrat Fateh Ali Khan and the Sabri Brothers on Real World Records, together with their appearances at WOMAD festivals, were instrumental in introducing qawwali to wider audiences beyond its traditional South Asian audience. Other notable qawwals include the Roohani Sisters, Fareed Ayaz and Abu Muhammad, Abdullah Manzoor Niazi, Rahat Fateh Ali Khan, Badar Miandad, the Rizwan-Muazzam Qawwali Group, the Qutbi Brothers, Amjad Sabri, Qawwal Bahauddin Qutbuddin, Najm Saif and Brothers, and Aziz Naza.

== Terminology ==
The word qawwālī derives from qawl (Arabic: قَوْل, romanized: qawl), meaning "utterance" or "saying." In the Sufi tradition, qawl also came to denote a form of devotional song based on or inspired by sayings attributed to the Prophet Muhammad. The term qawwāl, meaning "one who recites or utters", subsequently came to denote the performer of such devotional music, while qawwali refers to the musical performance itself.

== Origins ==
The development of qawwali during the Delhi Sultanate is widely attributed to the 13th-century Sufi poet and musician Amir Khusrau, who, as the devoted disciple (murīd) of the Chishti Sufi saint Nizamuddin Auliya, synthesised Indo-Persian musical and poetic traditions for Sufi devotional practice. Amir Khusrau based the Qawwali on the Indian raga, with the musician singing "within the framework of the raga." Khusrau composed devotional poetry in Persian and Hindavi for gatherings known as mehfil-e-samā ("assemblies for listening"), and is credited with refining a style of musical presentation that became the foundation of the qawwali tradition. These mehfil-e-samā were regularly held in the khānqāh of Nizamuddin Auliya in Delhi, where qawwals sang devotional poetry before an audience of disciples and spiritual seekers. As such, Qawwali is the result of "the Muslim-Hindu musical confluence that hybridized musical traditions in North India to various degrees over a millennium".

Within the Chishti order, samā ("listening") was regarded as a legitimate spiritual practice capable of awakening divine love (ishq), remembrance of Allah (dhikr), and drawing the seeker closer to the Divine. Accordingly, the purpose of the mehfil-e-samā was not entertainment but spiritual elevation, in which devotional music served as a vehicle for contemplation, dhikr, and, for those who were spiritually prepared, the experience of wajd (ecstatic absorption in the remembrance of Allah). Classical Sufi masters such as Al-Ghazali and Al-Hujwiri emphasise that the spiritual benefits of samā depend upon the purification and discipline of the carnal self (nafs).

From its earliest development, qawwali drew upon verses from the Qur'an, ḥadīth, Persian and Hindavi Sufi poetry, and mystical symbolism to express themes of divine love (ishq), longing for closeness to Allah, praise of the Prophet Muhammad, and veneration of his family (Ahl al-Bayt) and the saints (awliyā). One of the earliest qawwalis traditionally associated with Amir Khusrau is the qaul Man Kunto Maula, based on the well-known Prophetic saying, "Whoever has me as master, then Ali is his master." The qawwali repertoire encompasses several devotional forms, including hamd (praise of Allah), qaul, na'at (praise of the Prophet Muhammad), and manqabat (poetry in honour of Imam Ali, other members of Ahl al-Bayt, and Sufi saints), each serving a distinct devotional purpose within the mehfil-e-samā.

In the religiously and culturally diverse setting of Medieval India, qawwali shared thematic resonances with Hindu Bhakti devotional traditions. Both used the language of love and separation: the Sufi idea of ishq aligns with Bhakti notions of prem (devotional love) and viraha (the pain of separation). Amir Khusrau sometimes drew on Indic imagery, including motifs linked to Krishna devotion, in his poetry — part of the wider Indo-Persian cultural synthesis of medieval India.

Originally, musical instrument use in Qawwali was prohibited. The following conditions were initially placed on Qawwali:

Sima' (to listen to Qawwali) is permissible if a few conditions are met. The singer must be an adult and not a child or a female. The listener must only listen to everything in the remembrance of Allah. The words that are sung must be free from obscenity and indecency and they must not be void. Musical instruments must not be present in the gathering. If all these conditions are met, Sima' is permissible.

Someone complained to the Sultan of the Mashaa'ikh that some of the dervishes danced in a gathering where there were musical instruments. He said, they did not do good as something impermissible cannot be condoned.

— Siyar al-Awliya

Sufi Saints such as Nizamuddin Auliya, the teacher of the famous Sufi singer Amir Khusrow, were quite blunt about the prohibition:

Musical instruments are Haram.

— Fawa'id al-Fu'aad

Eventually, however, musical instrument use found its way into Qawwali. Instruments such as the harmonium, tabla and dholak are now common in many Qawwali parties.

== Historical practice and training ==
Traditional Qawwali practice is built upon a system of hereditary training, in which qawwals are part of the service community connected to a particular shrine. Their primary function to the shrine is to service formal activities, primarily the death anniversaries of Sufi saints (Urs).

Since the intention of qawwali is to act as a bridge toward the experience of Sufi mystical love and builds upon religious chants and chanted poetry, the practice is viewed as permissible in what Islamic scholar Lois Lamya al-Faruqi refers to as non-musiqa. Qawwals themselves are central figures within Qawwali ritual but are not regarded as the focus and are still regarded as part of the servant class.

Qawwals are trained in two primary ways: (1) as part of a bradri or brotherhood of performers in which they learn the fundamentals of the music, and (2) within Sufic teaching circles typically reserved for the higher classes in which they learn about Sufism. The understanding of the spiritual aspects but also the form's reliance on poetry requires a level of literacy in order to fulfill the role.

== Qawwali repertory ==
Ethnomusicologist Regula Qureshi distinguishes between "old" tunes (purānī dhuneṅ, purānī bandisheṅ) and "tunes of nowadays" (ājkal kī dhuneṅ). The "old" tune repertory includes movable tunes that can be adapted to multiple poems as well as "special" (makhsūs, khās) settings of poems, which are identified by their text. Qureshi also includes "typical Qawwal tunes" (Qawwālī kī thet dhunen) in this category, referring to tunes that can be used for a variety of poems based on the music's structural features.

The songs which constitute the qawwali repertoire are primarily in Persian, Urdu, and Hindi, although Sufi poetry appears in local languages as well (including Punjabi, Saraiki, and dialects of northern India like Braj Bhasha and Awadhi.) The sound of regional language qawwali can be totally different from that of mainstream qawwali, as in the case of Chhote Babu Qawwal, whose style of singing is much closer to the Bengali Baul music than to the qawwali of Nusrat Fateh Ali Khan, for example.

The central themes of qawwali are love, devotion, and longing for the Divine. The Sufi poets whose texts have made up the qawwali repertory often used worldly images to convey mystic spiritual love. As such, it is not uncommon to see mentions of worldly or forbidden concepts such as romantic longing, wine, and drunkenness, which are used as metaphors for the mystic state. Qawwals bear the responsibility of maintaining a spiritually appropriate context for such songs, so as not to distract from the religious focus of the Qawwali occasion.

Qawwali songs are classified by their content into several categories:

- A Qaul, Arabic for 'saying,' is a basic ritual song of Sufism in India, often used as an opening or closing hymn for a Qawwali occasion. The texts contain sayings of the Prophet Muhammad (hence the form's name), and they form an obligatory part of the Qawwali occasion. The Qaul may be followed by one or more obligatory hymns that refer to the founding saint of a given Sufi lineage.
- A hamd (حمد), Arabic for 'praise,' is a song (or poem) in praise of Allah. A hamd traditionally begins the thematic sequence of songs in a Qawwali occasion (after the obligatory hymns).
- A na`at (نعت), Arabic for 'description,' is a song (or poem) in praise of Muhammad. The hamd is traditionally followed by a na`at.
- A manqabat (plural manaqib, مناقب, which means 'characteristics') is a song in praise of either Imam Ali or one of the Sufi saints. Manaqib in praise of Ali are sung at both Sunni and Shi'a gatherings. If one is sung, it will follow right after the na`at. There is usually at least one manqabat in a traditional program.
- A marsiya (مرثية), Arabic for 'lamentation for a dead person', is a lamentation over the death of much of Imam Husayn's family in the Battle of Karbala. This would typically be sung only at a Shi'a gathering.

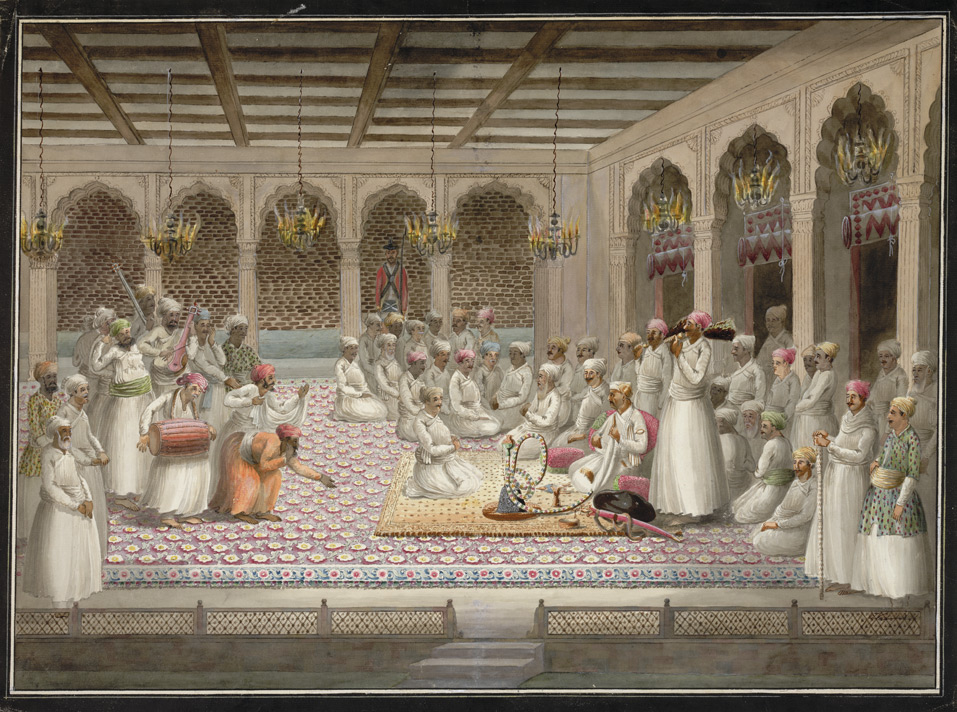
The diwan of the Nawab Wazir of Oudh, Asaf-ud-dowlah, who sits smoking a hookah listening to musicians in Lucknow, ca. 1812.

- A ghazal (غزل), Arabic for 'love song' and based on the poetic genre of the same name, is a song made up of thematically independent couplets in Farsi or Urdu. The ghazal is found in the majority of qawwali songs, and has been considered an ideal form for the mystical experience because its emphasis on repetition allows a qawwal to reiterate a central theme or phrase, which can be used as a way to engage in dhikr. To create a sense of thematic unity, ghazals often draw from conventional metaphors, imagery, and topics throughout the form, such as themes of unrequited love, separation from (or reunion with) the beloved, the beauty of nature, and consuming wine. In the context of qawwali, these songs of yearning and intoxication use secular metaphors to poignantly express mystical concepts like the soul's longing for union with the Divine and its joy in loving the Divine. Intoxication is understood as a metaphor for attaining spiritual knowledge, or being filled with the joy of loving the Divine. In the songs of yearning, the scorned lover becomes a metaphor for the soul that has been abandoned in this world by God and longs for reunion. While ghazals take on a specifically devotional context in qawwali performance, the form exists beyond devotional music, constituting a distinct secular musical genre in Pakistan and India where the poetry's worldly themes may be taken at face value.
- A kafi is a poem in Punjabi, Seraiki or Sindhi, which is in the unique style of poets such as Sultan Bahoo, Shah Hussain, Bulleh Shah and Sachal Sarmast. Two of the more well-known Kafis include Ni Main Jana Jogi De Naal and Mera Piya Ghar Aaya.
- A munajaat (مناجاة), Arabic for a conversation in the night or a form of prayer, is a song where the singer displays his thanks to Allah through a variety of linguistic techniques. It is often sung in Persian, with Mawlana Jalāl-ad-Dīn Rumi credited as its author.

== Composition of a Qawwali party ==
A group of qawwali musicians, called a party (or Humnawa in Hindi-Urdu), typically consists of eight or nine men including a lead singer, one or two side singers, one or two harmoniums (which may be played by the lead singer, side singer or someone else), and percussion. If there is only one percussionist, he plays the tabla and dholak, usually the tabla with the dominant hand and the dholak with the other one (i.e. a left-handed percussionist would play the tabla with his left hand). Often there will be two percussionists, in which case one might play the tabla and the other the dholak. There is also a chorus of four or five men who repeat key verses, and who aid percussion by hand-clapping.

The performers sit cross-legged on the ground in two rows — the lead singer, side singers and harmonium players in the front row, and the chorus and percussionists in the back row.

Before the fairly recent introduction of the harmonium, qawwalis were usually accompanied by the sarangi. The sarangi had to be retuned between songs; the harmonium didn't, and was soon preferred.

Women used to be excluded from traditional Muslim music, since they are traditionally prohibited from singing in the presence of men. These traditions have changed, however, as is evident by the popularity (and acceptance) of female singers such as Abida Parveen. However, qawwali has remained a predominantly male business and there are still not many mainstream female qawwals.

== Musical structure of Qawwali ==
The longest recorded commercially released qawwali runs slightly over 115 minutes (Hashr Ke Roz Yeh Poochhunga by Aziz Mian Qawwal). The qawwali maestro Nusrat Fateh Ali Khan has at least two songs that are more than 60 minutes long.

Qawwalis tend to begin gently and build steadily to a very high energy level in order to induce hypnotic states both among the musicians and within the audience. Almost all Qawwalis are based on a Raga from the Hindustani classical music tradition. Songs are usually arranged as follows:

1. They start with an instrumental prelude where the main melody is played on the harmonium, accompanied by the tabla, and which may include improvised variations of the melody.
2. Then comes the alap, a long tonal improvised melody during which the singers intone different long notes, in the raga of the song to be played.
3. The lead singer begins to sing some preamble verses which are typically not part of the main song, although thematically related to it. These are sung unrhythmically, improvised following the raga, and accompanied only by the harmonium. After the lead singer sings a verse, one of the side singers will repeat the verse, perhaps with his own improvisation. A few or many verses will be sung in this way, leading into the main song.
4. As the main song begins, the tabla, dholak and clapping begin. All members join in the singing of the verses that constitute the refrain. The lyrics of the main verses are never improvised; in fact, these are often traditional songs sung by many groups, especially within the same lineage. However, the tunes are subtly improvised within the framework of the main melody. As the song proceeds, the lead singer or one of the side singers may break out into an alap. Nusrat Fateh Ali Khan also popularised the interjection of sargam singing at this point. The song usually builds in tempo and passion, with each singer trying to outdo the other in terms of vocal acrobatics. Some singers may do long periods of sargam improvisation, especially alternating improvisations with a student singer. The songs usually end suddenly.

The singing style of qawwali is different from Western singing styles in many ways. For example, in words beginning with an "m", Western singers are apt to stress the vowel following the "m" rather than the "m" itself, whereas in qawwali, the "m" will usually be held, producing a muted tone. Also in qawwali, there is no distinction between what is known as the chest voice and the head voice (the different areas that sound will resonate in depending on the frequency sung). Rather, qawwals sing very loudly and forcefully, which allows them to extend their chest voice to much higher frequencies than those used in Western singing, even though this usually causes a more noisy or strained sound than what would be acceptable in the West.

== Notable Qawwals of the past 70 years ==
- Aziz Mian
- Badar Ali Khan, (also known as Badar Miandad)
- Bahauddin Qutbuddin
- Fateh Ali Khan
- Prabha Bharti
- Habib Painter
- Iqbal Hussain Khan Bandanawazi
- Munshi Raziuddin
- Nusrat Fateh Ali Khan
- Sabri Brothers
- Wadali Brothers
- Warsi Brothers
- Qutbi Brothers
- Shankar Shambhu Qawwal

== Current and recent Qawwals ==
- Ateeq Hussain Khan
- Abdullah Manzoor Niazi
- Faiz Ali Faiz
- Fareed Ayaz
- Dhruv Sangari
- Rahat Fateh Ali Khan
- Sukhawat Ali Khan
- Rizwan Muazzam
- Waheed and Naveed Chishti
- Warsi Brothers
- Qutbi Brothers
- Tahir Faridi Qawwal
- Aminah Chishti Qawwal
- Amjad Sabri
- Abida Parveen
- Sanam Marvi
- Nooran Sisters
- Abi Sampa
- Saami Brothers

== See also ==
- Filmi qawwali
- Islamic music
- Music of Bangladesh
- Music of India
- Music of Pakistan
- Religious ecstasy
- Sama (Sufism)
- Sufi music
- Urban Qawwali
