= Sufi music =

Devotional music of the Sufis

Sufi music refers to the devotional music of the Sufis, inspired by the works of Sufi poets like Rumi, Hafiz, Bulleh Shah, Amir Khusrow, and Khwaja Ghulam Farid.

Qawwali is the best-known form of Sufi music and is most commonly found in the Sufi culture in South Asia. However, music is also central to the Sema ceremony of the whirling dervishes, which is set to a form of music called Ayin, a vocal and instrumental piece featuring Turkish classical instruments such as the ney (a reed flute). The West African gnawa is another form, and Sufis from Indonesia to Afghanistan to Morocco have made music central to their practices.

Sufi love songs are often performed as ghazals and Kafi, a solo genre accompanied by percussion and harmonium, using a repertoire of songs by Sufi poets.

== Musicians ==
Abida Parveen, a Pakistani Sufi singer is one of the foremost exponents of Sufi music, considered the finest Sufi vocalists of the modern era. Sanam Marvi, another Pakistani singer has recently gained recognition for her Sufi vocal performances. Asrar Shah a Lahore based Sufi singer who gained popularity in Coke Studio Pakistan and now is owner of his music producing company Soul Speaks.

A. R. Rahman, the Oscar-winning Indian musician, has several compositions which draw inspiration from the Sufi genre; examples are the filmi qawwalis Piya Haji Ali in the film Fiza, Khwaja Mere Khwaja in the film Jodhaa Akbar, Arziyan in the film Delhi 6, Kun Faya Kun in the film Rockstar and Maula Wa Salim in the film O Kadhal Kanmani. He has performed many Sufi concerts in The Sufi Rout at Delhi. He performed Light Upon Light in Dubai with Sami Yusuf.

Bengali singer Lalan Fakir and Bangladesh's national poet Kazi Nazrul Islam scored several Sufi songs.

Junoon, a band from Pakistan, created the genre of Sufi rock/Sufi Folk Rock by combining elements of modern hard rock and traditional folk music with Sufi poetry.

In 2005, Rabbi Shergill released a Sufi rock song called "Bulla Ki Jaana," which became a chart-topper in India and Pakistan.

Madonna, on her 1994 record Bedtime Stories, sings a song called "Bedtime Story" that discusses achieving a high unconsciousness level. The video for the song shows an ecstatic Sufi ritual with many dervishes dancing, Arabic calligraphy and some other Sufi elements. In her 1998 song "Bittersweet", she recites Rumi's poem by the same name. In her 2001 Drowned World Tour, Madonna sang the song "Secret" showing rituals from many religions, including a Sufi dance.

Singer/songwriter Loreena McKennitt's record The Mask and Mirror (1994) has a song called "The Mystic's Dream" that is influenced by Sufi music and poetry. The band mewithoutYou has made references to Sufi parables, including the name of their album It's All Crazy! It's All False! It's All a Dream! It's Alright (2009). Tori Amos makes a reference to Sufis in her song "Cruel".

Mercan Dede is a Turkish composer who incorporates Sufism into his music and performances.

Shohreh Moavenian is an Iranian singer who sings Rumi's poems. She has produced two albums by the title "Molana & Shora 1 and 2" in which she incorporates elements of pop and traditional Persian music.

== See also ==
- Arabic music
- Durood
- Hamd
- Islamic music
- Islamic poetry
- Mawlid
- Mehfil
- Music of Turkey
- Na'at
- Nasheed
- Sufi poetry
- Sufism
- History of Sufism
- Mamta Joshi
