= Ustad Bade Inayat Hussain Khan =

Indian Hindustani classical musician (1837–1923)

Bade Inayat Ali Khan
- Born: 1837
- Died: 1923 (aged 85–86)
- Occupation: Singer
- Style: Indian classical; Gwalior Gharana
- Children: Qurban Hussain Khan

Ustad Bade Inayat Ali Khan (1837–1923) was an Indian classical singer who belonged to the famous Gwalior Gharana school of music.

== Biography ==
He was the son of Haddu Khan who was the maternal grandson of Nathan Peer Khan Bakhsh, the founder of the Gwalior Gharana school of Classical Music. Bakhsh was the first person to introduce Bol Bant in Khyal Gayki singing. His Khyal Gayki is used in all the Gharanas. Haddu Khan's son, Bade Inayat Ali Khan, was a singer who expanded the Gwalior style from the methodical form it followed to the emotional style that he preferred.

The most significant changes in the parampara (the guru–shishya tradition) came from around the late 18th century onward, during the Chandra Gupta phase of Indian Nationalism, following the migration of Nathan Khan Peer Baksh from Lucknow to Gwalior. His grandsons, Haddu Khan and Hassu Khan, evolved the genre of khyal into its present structure and popularised it. Inayat Hussain Khan was the first to introduced Bol Bant in Khyal Gayki.

Gwalior Gharana of Indian classical music is easily the doyen amongst Khayal gharanas.

Khan's son, Ustad Qurban Hussain Khan, continued his legacy and received the title of Raj Gayak.
