= Ali Arshad Mir =

Pakistani Punjabi-language poet (1951–2008)

- علی ارشد میر
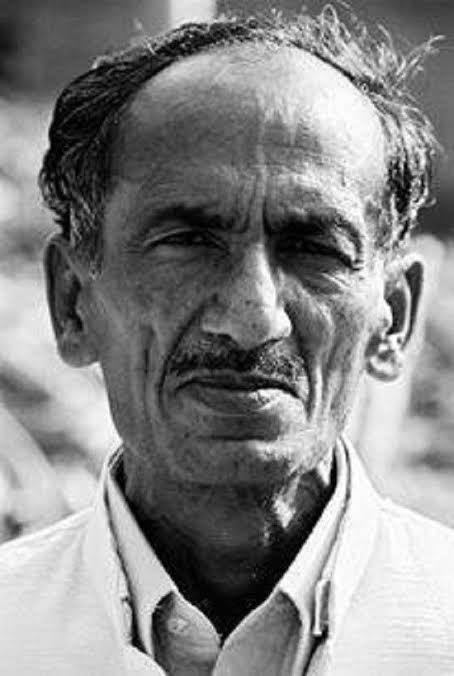
- Photograph of Arshad Mir
- Born: 1 January 1951; Chishtian, Punjab, Pakistan
- Died: 16 October 2008 (aged 57); Lahore, Punjab, Pakistan
- Resting place: Chishtian, Punjab, Pakistan
- Other name: Homer of Punjab
- Education: M.A. in Punjabi
- Occupations: Professor; Poet

Ali Arshad Mir (Punjabi: علی ارشد میر; 16 October 2008 – 1 January 1951) was a Pakistani epic poet and writer of the Punjabi, often described as the "Homer of Punjab". His works have been translated into languages such as Urdu and English. In the 1970s, his International Anthem brought him recognition. His lines like "Girti hui deewaro'n ko aik dhaka aur do" (Urdu: گرتی ہوئی دیواروں کو ایک دھکا اور دو; Give the falling walls one more push) are a popular slogan in Pakistan and around the world. His work includes dozens of poems that depict the socio-economic condition of society's oppressed people.

== Personal life ==
Ali Arshad was born in a Punjabi Muslim family in Chishtian, 250 km away from Lahore, Punjab, Pakistan. He completed his M.A. in Punjabi language, and was appointed as an Associate Professor in Government M.A.O College Lahore. Later, he joined Government Degree College Dipalpur, Okara as its Principal. He also worked with Mazdoor Kissan Party. He was known as an dervish, down to earth and straightforward man who could not be swayed by flattery for any favours or compromises. That is why he was transferred 26 times during his educational career as an educationist. He was also a notable activist who had frequently spoken out for the rights of workers and those pushed to the margins of society

== Major works ==
Mir Sahab wrote his first work of poetry at the age of 16 and was considered an "Inqilabi", or profound poet, from a very early age. He dedicated his life to the depiction of the suffering of the underprivileged. His poems are considered a source of inspiration for oppressed people. In the 1970s, he wrote the revolutionary international anthem, "Girti hui deewaro ko aik dhaka aur do", which remains a popular slogan used in rebellions. In the same era, he wrote a Pakistani shadow play, Ravi Sy Bias Tak. He compiled the posthumous work of Ustad Daman and named it Daman Daye Moti.

Kaifi Azmi translated Mir's poems to Urdu. Waheed Ahmed's poem Khana Badosh, considered a major Urdu work, was derived from his epic poem Gawachi Katha di War (Punjabi: گواچی کتھا دی وار).

== Legacy ==
Mir died in October 2008. His last words were "nazam kuj chair baad samny ay gee" and he rests in Bahawalnagar District Punjab, Pakistan.

His literary work was published posthumously. His book Ik Katha De War consists of autobiographical notes about his life, beliefs and teachings. The play Ravi Sy Bias Tak is included in the syllabus of National College of Arts.

Every year, the Mir Foundation organizes Punjabi Mela, an event that consists of poets and people associated with Punjabi literature paying Mir tribute by organizing his works. In 2018, First Dalit Mela was organized by Mir foundation and MNS University of Agriculture which depicted hardship, life and culture of lower caste Hindus residing in Pakistan, it had several events and dramatized plays based on works of prominent writers like Munshi Premchand. The festival has a lot to offer including literary sessions, performances, stalls and last but not the least food-for-thought conversations by various speakers. The festival also has several books and handicrafts stalls promoting cultural diversity and education.

== Selected works ==
- اِک کتھا دی وار (*Ik Katha Di War*, The Story of a Generation) – A posthumously published collection of autobiographical poems reflecting the poet's ideological journey and personal experiences.
- گِرتی ہوئی دیوار کو ایک دھکا اور دو (*Girti Hui Deewar Ko Ek Dhakka Aur Do*, Give the Falling Wall One More Push) – A compilation of revolutionary Punjabi poetry from the 1970s, best known for its iconic slogan advocating social change.
- راوی سے بیاس تک (*Ravi Se Beas Tak*, From Ravi to Beas) – A political shadow-play addressing historical, social, and cultural themes of Punjab.
- دامن دے موتی (*Daman De Moti*, Pearls of Daman) – A curated collection of selected poems by Ustad Daman, edited and introduced by Ali Arshad Mir.
