= Taufiq Rafat =

Pakistani author and poet (1927 – 1998)

- Born: 25 October 1927; Sialkot
- Died: 2 August 1998 (aged 71); Lahore
- Occupation: Author

Taufiq Rafat (25 October 1927 – 2 August 1998) was a Pakistani author and poet, active in the English language. His work influenced other Pakistani poets and he is credited with the introduction of the concept of a "Pakistani idiom" in English literature. He translated several works from Punjabi literature into English, including the epic of Puran Bhagat by Qadir Yar and the poetry of Punjabi Sufi poet Bulleh Shah, which was published by the Oxford University Press.

Born and raised in Sialkot in 1927 in a Punjabi family, Taufiq has been referred to as "the Ezra Pound of Pakistan" for his modernist style that includes a naturalist view. Rafat conducted poetry workshops, which influenced many younger poets. After surviving a stroke in 1984, he stopped writing. Taufiq died fourteen years later in 1998 at the age of 71 in Lahore.

== Poetry ==
=== Children Understand Him ===
Here the poet describes the life of Old Man. A young grandfather of three grandchildren (2 sons, 1 daughter) of his son. The metaphor here is used 'Otherwise he is a Dry Stream Bed' which means once his (old man/grandfather) life ran like a river or stream but now it is dry. It means when he was in his youth, he used to live like other young men. Further is written 'Living on Memories' which means He is now living on memories. And further it is written that 'And the hospitality Now given, revoked Of his sons and daughters' which means when the guest arrive, he (old man/grandfather) sent to his room because of many causes such as because he may bore new guests on stories of his life and wherever he will go, children will follow him. Further, here is 'From man-roar, and friendly' which means They (grandchildren) give friendly punches on his (grandfather)'s chest. 'And damp kisses on scrubbed cheeks, They sail to the harbour of his knees' which means that he (old man) gives damp kisses to their grandchildren, ever that are dirty. And grandchildren feel safe on his (old man) knees.

== Translations ==
In 2016, his translation of the classical Punjabi poet Bulleh Shah was published by Oxford University Press.

== Poems ==
- Arrival of the Monsoon only (some details as found on Google Books, no texts)
