= Bullah Ki Jaana =

Kafi poem by Bulleh Shah

Bulleya Ki Jaana (Note: Punjabi: بُلّھیا کِیہ جاݨاں (Shahmukhi), ਬੁੱਲ੍ਹਾ ਕੀ ਜਾਣਾਂ (Gurmukhi), romanized: Bullhā kīh jāṇā) (Punjabi: [bʊ'l(ɦ)jaː kiː d͡ʒaːɳaː] is a kafi poem written by Punjabi Sufi poet and philosopher Bulleh Shah. It is one of the most popular of his kafis, incorporating religious, philosophical, and humanist aspects.

In the 1990s Junoon, a rock band from Pakistan, rendered "Bullah Ki Jaana". In 2005, Rabbi Shergill's rock/fusion version of Bullah Ki Jaana became a chart-topper in India and Pakistan. The Wadali Brothers, a Punjabi Sufi group from India, have also released a version of "Bullah Ki Jaana" on their album Aa Mil Yaar... Call of the Beloved. Another version was performed by Lakhwinder Wadali and entitled Bullah. The poem was also rendered by Arieb Azhar in his debut album "Wajj". A version was released in 2010 by Shahbaz Khan under the label of Fire Records (Pakistan).

== Lyrics ==
=== Shahmukhi ===
نا میں مومن وِچ مسِیتاں، نا میں وِچ کُفر دِیاں رِیتاں،
،نا میں پاکاں وِچ پلِیت آں، نا میں موسیٰ نا فرعون
بُلّھیا، کِیہ جاݨاں میں کوݨ۔
،نا میں اندر بید کتاباں، نا وِچ بھنگاں نا شراباں
،نا وِچ رِنداں مست خراباں، نا وِچ جاگݨ سوݨ
بُلّھیا، کِیہ جاݨاں میں کوݨ۔
،نا وِچ شادی نا غمناکی، نا میں وِچ پلِیتی پاکی
،نا میں آبی نا میں خاکی، نا میں آتش پَوݨ
بُلّھیا، کِیہ جاݨاں میں کوݨ۔
،نا میں عربی نا لہوری، نا ہِندی شہر ناگوری
،نا ہِندوُ نا تُرک پشوری، نا میں رَہِندا وِچ نَدوݨ
بُلّھیا، کِیہ جاݨاں میں کوݨ۔
،نا میں بھیت مزہب دا پائیا، نا میں آدم حوا جائیا
،نا میں آپݨا نام دھرائیا، نا میں بیٹھݨ وِچ بھَوݨا
بُلّھیا، کِیہ جاݨاں میں کوݨ۔
،اَوّل آخر آپ نوُ جاݨاں، نا کوئی دوُجا ہور پچھاݨاں
،میتھوں ہور نا کوئی سیاݨا، بُلّھا شاہ کھڑا ہے کوݨ
بُلّھیا، کِیہ جاݨاں میں کوݨ۔

=== Gurmukhi ===
ਨਾ ਮੈਂ ਮੋਮਨ ਵਿਚ ਮਸੀਤਾਂ, ਨਾ ਮੈਂ ਵਿਚ ਕੁਫ਼ਰ ਦੀਆਂ ਰੀਤਾਂ,
ਨਾ ਮੈਂ ਪਾਕਾਂ ਵਿਚ ਪਲੀਤਾਂ, ਨਾ ਮੈਂ ਮੂਸਾ ਨਾ ਫਰਔਨ।
ਬੁੱਲ੍ਹਾ ਕੀ ਜਾਣਾ ਮੈਂ ਕੌਣ।
ਨਾ ਮੈਂ ਅੰਦਰ ਬੇਦ ਕਿਤਾਬਾਂ, ਨਾ ਵਿਚ ਭੰਗਾਂ ਨਾ ਸ਼ਰਾਬਾਂ,
ਨਾ ਵਿਚ ਰਿੰਦਾਂ ਮਸਤ ਖਰਾਬਾਂ, ਨਾ ਵਿਚ ਜਾਗਣ ਨਾ ਵਿਚ ਸੌਣ।
ਬੁੱਲ੍ਹਾ ਕੀ ਜਾਣਾ ਮੈਂ ਕੌਣ।
ਨਾ ਵਿਚ ਸ਼ਾਦੀ ਨਾ ਗ਼ਮਨਾਕੀ, ਨਾ ਮੈਂ ਵਿਚ ਪਲੀਤੀ ਪਾਕੀ,
ਨਾ ਮੈਂ ਆਬੀ ਨਾ ਮੈਂ ਖ਼ਾਕੀ, ਨਾ ਮੈਂ ਆਤਿਸ਼ ਨਾ ਮੈਂ ਪੌਣ।
ਬੁੱਲ੍ਹਾ ਕੀ ਜਾਣਾ ਮੈਂ ਕੌਣ।
ਨਾ ਮੈਂ ਅਰਬੀ ਨਾ ਲਾਹੌਰੀ, ਨਾ ਮੈਂ ਹਿੰਦੀ ਸ਼ਹਿਰ ਨਗੌਰੀ,
ਨਾ ਹਿੰਦੂ ਨਾ ਤੁਰਕ ਪਸ਼ੌਰੀ, ਨਾ ਮੈਂ ਰਹਿੰਦਾ ਵਿਚ ਨਦੌਣ।
ਬੁੱਲ੍ਹਾ ਕੀ ਜਾਣਾ ਮੈਂ ਕੌਣ।
ਨਾ ਮੈਂ ਭੇਤ ਮਜ਼ਹਬ ਦਾ ਪਾਇਆ, ਨਾ ਮੈਂ ਆਦਮ ਹਵਾ ਜਾਇਆ,
ਨਾ ਮੈਂ ਆਪਣਾ ਨਾਮ ਧਰਾਇਆ, ਨਾ ਵਿਚ ਬੈਠਣ ਨਾ ਵਿਚ ਭੌਣ।
ਬੁੱਲ੍ਹਾ ਕੀ ਜਾਣਾ ਮੈਂ ਕੌਣ।
ਅੱਵਲ ਆਖਰ ਆਪ ਨੂੰ ਜਾਣਾਂ, ਨਾ ਕੋਈ ਦੂਜਾ ਹੋਰ ਪਛਾਣਾਂ,
ਮੈਥੋਂ ਹੋਰ ਨਾ ਕੋਈ ਸਿਆਣਾ, ਬੁਲ੍ਹਾ ਸ਼ਾਹ ਖੜ੍ਹਾ ਹੈ ਕੌਣ।
ਬੁੱਲ੍ਹਾ ਕੀ ਜਾਣਾ ਮੈਂ ਕੌਣ।

=== Translated Version ===
I do not believe in mosques, I do not believe in blasphemy,
I am not the unclean among the righteous, I am neither Moses nor Pharaoh.
Who am I?
I don't have books inside, neither cannabis nor alcohol,
In no way do you fall asleep, in no way do you wake up in no way do you sleep.
Who am I?
Neither marriage nor sorrow, nor purity in me,
Neither I am of the water, nor of the soil, nor the fire, nor the wind.
Who am I?
Neither am I Arab nor Lahori, nor am I the Hindi city of Nagauri.
Neither Hindu nor Turk Peshori, nor I live in Nadoun.
Who am I?
I did not find the secret religion, nor did I become Adam and Eve.
I didn't mention my name, I didn't sit in it, I didn't even look at it.
Who am I?
First and last, let me know myself, and not anyone else,
Who is standing wiser than me, Bulleh Shah?
Who am I?
