= Chaiyya Chaiyya =

Song by A. R. Rahman

from the album Dil Se.. soundtrack
- Released: 1998
- Studio: Panchathan Record Inn
- Genre: Bollywood; Filmi; Sufi; Pop-folk
- Length: 6:48
- Label: Sony Classical; Venus; Varèse Sarabande
- Composer: A. R. Rahman
- Lyricist: Gulzar
- Producer: A. R. Rahman

Audio sample
- file; help

"Chaiyya Chaiyya" (transl. Walk in shade) is an Indian pop-folk song, featured in the soundtrack of the Bollywood film Dil Se.., released in 1998. Based on Sufi music and Urdu poetry, the single was derived from the lyrics of the song "Tere Ishq Nachaya", written by Bulleh Shah, with music composed by A.R. Rahman, written by Gulzar, and sung by Sukhwinder Singh and Sapna Awasthi. The accompanying music video was directed by Mani Ratnam and picturised on Shah Rukh Khan and Malaika Arora, where they perform the song on the top of a moving train.

== Composition ==
The lyrics of "Chaiyya Chaiyya" are based on the Sufi folk song "Tere Ishq Nachaya", with lyrics written by poet Bulleh Shah. Singer Sukhwinder Singh originally suggested the song to A.R. Rahman who was looking for a Punjabi devotional song to include on the soundtrack of Dil Se... Gulzar subsequently rewrote the lyrics and changed the name to "Chaiyya Chaiyya". This song has been composed in the Raga Megh / Madhumad Sarang (both of which correspond to Madhyamavati in Carnatic Music).

In an interview called "Sadhanai Tamilargal" alongside Mani Ratnam and Vairamuthu, A. R. Rahman stated that the song was originally composed for his album Vande Mataram. But as it didn't fit in, he decided to show it to Mani Ratnam, who loves these kind of catchy tunes. The very first time hearing the song, Mani Ratnam decided to shoot the song on a train.

== Music video ==
The video was filmed on top of the Ooty train, powered by X-Class Steam Locomotive (the Nilgiri Mountain Railway) in mountainous Tamil Nadu, southern India, while actor Shahrukh Khan dances with model/actress Malaika Arora and other dancers. The film was directed by Mani Ratnam and recorded by Santosh Sivan. The choreography was completed in four and half days by Farah Khan. No major back projections or post-production special effects were used in the music video.

Malaika Arora, one of the performers, recalls: "Would you believe it? Well, the 'Chaiya Chaiya' song was shot exactly as you see it on the screen: No camera tricks, no back projection, no post-production special effects!" She also said that "...One of the unit members tripped and hurt himself. Other than that, things were safe."

== Reception ==
"Chaiyya Chaiyya" was a critical and commercial success, selling over six million units in India, and earning a cult following internationally, which led to it often being cited as an influential track in Hindi cinema. In 2002, the BBC World Service conducted an international poll to choose the ten most popular songs of all time, on which "Chaiyya Chaiyya" finished at the ninth position.

=== Awards and nominations ===
Year	Award	Category	Recipients	Results
1999	Filmfare Awards	Best Lyricist	Gulzar	Won
1999	Filmfare Awards	Best Male Playback	Sukhwinder Singh	Won
1999	Filmfare Awards	Best Choreography	Farah Khan	Won
1999	Star Screen Awards	Best Male Playback	Sukhwinder Singh	Won

== Legacy ==
"Chaiyya Chaiyya" became especially popular and the song has been featured in the film Inside Man (2006), in the musical Bombay Dreams, and in the television shows Smith and CSI: Miami. The Tamil dub of "Chaiyya Chaiyya", titled "Thaiyya Thaiyya", and the Telugu language dub also gained popularity in South India. In Indonesia, the song hit its popularity peak in 2010, following the viral video of First Police Brigadier rank Norman Kamaru covering the dance choreography. In 2006, Harris Jayaraj composed a song, "Orugalluke Pilla", for the film Sainikudu, whose background theme music was loosely inspired by "Chaiyya Chaiyya".

In 2023, Penn Masala sang the song in White House, ahead of Prime Minister Narendra Modi’s arrival.
