= Iqbal Hussain Khan Bandanawazi =

Iqbal Hussain Khan Bandanawazi (Urdu: ٱستاد اقبال حسن قان بنره نواذى; 1942-2010) was a Sufi qawwal of Hyderabad India. He had worked as a top artist in All India Radio Akashwani for many years. His Qawwali group is known as Bandanawazi Qawwal he learned Indian classical music from his father Qurban Hussain Khan.

== Family background ==
Khan belongs to Gwalior Gharana and his father Ustad Qurban Hussain Khan. He has four daughters and one son Ateeq Hussain Khan Bandanawazi who has learnt Qawwali since childhood from his father and resembles his voice and style. Ateeq Hussain Khan Qawwal is currently carrying the legacy of his father and heading the Sufi qawwali group Bandanawazi Qawwal.

== Achievements ==
He received Sangeet Prabhakar Award from Chief Minister of Andhra Pradesh, Y.S.Rajasekhara Reddy. He also received Lifetime Achievement Award from Urdu Academy and Andhra Pradesh tourism department. in 2001 he was received Bhagya Lakshmi Puruskar from Telugu academy. In 1982, he also received Sahitya Kala Parishad Samman from Government of Delhi. He has performed at Rashtrapati Bhavan in 1994 in front of then president of India, Shankar Dayal Sharma.
