= Qurban Hussain Khan =

Indian singer

Ustad Qurban Hussain Khan (Urdu: ٱستار قـربان حسن قان) was a singer connected to the Gwalior Gharana Indian classical music school. He was son of Ustad Bade Inayat Hussain Khan and grandson of Ustad Haddu Khan saheb.

== Background ==
He was born in Gwalior in 1901 and died in 1970 in Hyderabad. He was a champion of the Khayal gayki style of signing, which he learned from his father. He was awarded the title of Raj Gayak by the fifth Maharaja of Gwalior Many of his students who learn from him become very famous. His son, Iqbal Hussain Khan Bandanawazi, won many awards in singing. His great legacy is continued in singing by his grandson Ateeq Hussain Khan.
