= Qutbi Brothers =

- Origin: Khwaja Moinuddin Chishti, Amir Khusrau, India
- Genres: Sufi, Qawwali
- Instruments: Harmonium, Tabla, Dholak
- Years active: 800
- Label: Zee Music Company T-Series
- Members: Haji Mohammad Idris, Arshad Hussain, Adnan Qutbi
- Website: http://qawwalqutbibrothers.in

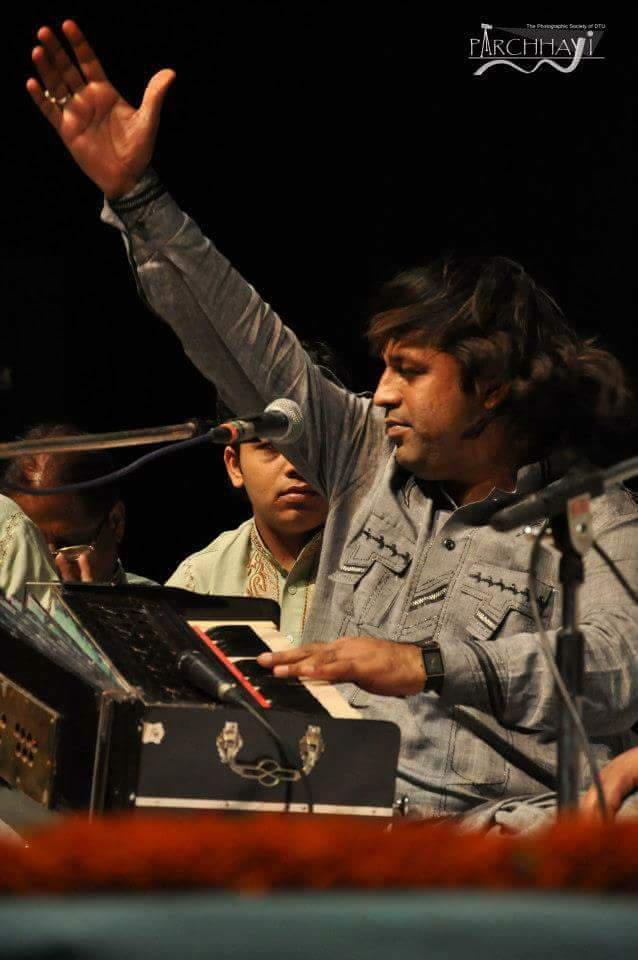
Qutbi Brothers (Haji Mohammad Idris) during the live concert.

Qutbi Brothers are an Indian Qawwali group, headed by Haji Mohammad Idris and Arshad Qutbi (born in Delhi) are better known as the Qutbi Brothers. They are considered as the most popular qawwali group of India.

== History ==
Qutbi Brothers are the inheritors of a 750 year old Qawwali tradition of India, nurtured and developed over several generations in India. They belong to the dargah of Qutbuddin Bakhtiyar Kaki in Delhi, where they began calling themselves the "Qutbi Brothers".

== Career ==
Qutbi Brothers started their singing at a very early age, and today they are one of the most popular qawwali singers in India. Qutbi Brothers are world's first qawwali singers who have set a "World Record" for a non-stop 12-hours qawwali singing (live), supported by the Sangeet Natak Akademi to promote qawwali tradition. The Qutbi Brothers (Haji Mohammad Idris and Arshad Hussain ) have earned the Top Grade level of artistry as recognized by All India Radio for their traditional sufiyana style. Moreover, Qutubi Brothers (Haji Mohamamad Idris and Arshad Hussain ) are an "Outstanding" empaneled artist of ICCR and the Ministry of Culture. For their art and contributions to sufi music Qutbi Brothers names was included and published in the Limca Book of Record in the 2019 edition. In their career, Qutbi Brothers have toured globally and performed at numerous music festivals in India and internationally. The award-winning ensemble has also performed extensively in India and internationally, in France, Kuwait, UK, Maldives, South Africa, Tanzania, UAE and Singapore and many others.

== Filmography ==
- 2015: Mere Maula (Room: The: Myster) (Bollywood movie)
- 2021: Piya Bin (Zee Music Company)
- 2002: Khwaja Ne Nawaza (T-Series)

== Social Work ==
Along with live performing, Qutbi Brothers are associated with various social works. They perform live concerts for various social causes to raise funds. In 2018 they performed for a fundraiser event for the unprivileged children organized by Salaam Baalak Trust.

== Awards and recognition ==
For their work and contribution to qawwali music, Idris Qutbi (Qutbi Brothers) have received several prestigious awards such as, Genius Indian Achiever’s Award, Special Prize from Parliament House (India), Atal Bihari Award 2019, Rajiv Gandhi Award among others.
