= MNS University of Agriculture =

Agricultural school in Multan, Pakistan

Coordinates: 30°9′54.79″N 71°29′48.72″E

- MNS University of Agriculture Logo
- Type: Public, Government
- Established: 2012
- Affiliations: Higher Education Commission (Pakistan), National Technology Council (Pakistan)
- Chancellor: Governor of the Punjab
- Vice-Chancellor: Prof. Dr. Asif Ali
- Location: Multan, Punjab, Pakistan
- Nickname: MNSUAM
- Website: mnsuam.edu.pk

The Muhammad Nawaz Shareef University of Agriculture (MNSUAM) (Urdu: محمد نواز شریف یونیورسٹی آف ایگریکلچر) is a public university located in Multan, Punjab, Pakistan. It was established in 2012 on the initiative of Chief Minister Punjab Mian Muhammad Shahbaz Sharif. The university is named after Nawaz Sharif. The Act of Muhammad Nawaz Shareef University of Agriculture was approved in 2013.

== History ==
The university was founded in 2012. It has a total area of 275.1 hectares and is located at two places. A piece of land comprising 72.8 hectares is allocated at mouza rangeel pur, University road, Multan, and the main campus of the university is located and another piece comprising 202.3 hectares is allotted at Jalalpur pirwala for agriculture farm.
