= Norman Kamaru =

Indonesian singer (born 1985)

- Born: Onca Marthinus; November 27, 1985 (age 40); Gorontalo, North Sulawesi, Indonesia
- Occupations: Singer, police, content creator, businessperson
- Years active: 2011–present
- Political party: National Awakening Party
- Police career
- Department: Mobile Brigade Corps
- Branch: Indonesian National Police
- Service years: 2005–2011
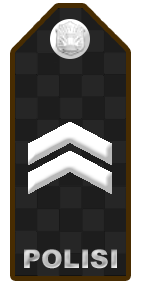
- Rank: First Police Brigadier

YouTube information
- Channel: @noormancamaru
- Years active: 2015–present
- Genres: Music; Vlog; comedy; Commentary
- Subscribers: 48.8 thousand
- Views: 1.55 million
- Last updated: 13 May 2024

Norman Kamaru (born 27 November 1985), formerly known as Briptu Norman, is a singer and former Indonesian police officer of the Mobile Brigade Corps. Prior to termination initiated by Indonesian National Police, his rank was the First Police Brigadier (Indonesian: Brigadir Polisi Satu, abbreviated: Briptu). Norman Kamaru was catapulted into stardom after a video of him singing "Chaiyya Chaiyya" by A. R. Rahman while in police uniform went viral in early April 2011 in YouTube. Later that year, He signed a billion rupiah (US$113,000) recording contract with Falcon Music Indonesia.

== Biography ==
Norman Kamaru was born in Gorontalo, North Sulawesi, Indonesia on 27 November 1985. He is the youngest of nine children, born to Idris Kamaru and Halima Marthinus. As a child, he enjoyed singing.

He started his career by joining the Mobile Brigade Corps of the Indonesian National Police, rising to the rank of the First Brigadier.

=== Celebrity ===
Norman Kamaru became famous after a video of him in uniform lip-synching "Chaiyya Chaiyya" and imitating Shahrukh Khan while on duty at a guard post, was uploaded to YouTube on 29 March 2011. Bagus BT Saragih of The Jakarta Post notes that his hand movements are like those used by Indian actors, while the accuracy of his lip-synching indicates that he had memorized the lyrics.

The video was a hit on YouTube, with viewers considering his actions "perfectly" like Khan's in Dil Se.., and eventually becoming a meme, "catapulting" Norman Kamaru to fame. He began recording his first single, "Cinta Farhat" ("Farhat's Love"), in April of that year.

As a result of his newfound celebrity, Norman Kamaru became a guest on Opera Van Java and Bukan Empat Mata, hosted by Tukul Arwana. He also received a film and commercial offer, which were rejected by the police department, according to a spokesman for the department, Norman Kamaru was not ready and would have to attend film school before acting. He also received a full legal scholarship from Bung Karno University in Jakarta, as well as a new motorcycle and a house.

However, the performing schedule detracted from his duties. As a result, on 7 July 2011 he was taken from the set of Hitam Putih, where he was filming a skit, by twenty people. Although first reported to be a kidnapping, it was later revealed that it had been officers of the Bureau of Professionalism and Security Affairs, who had taken him as he had not secured permission to be on the show.

In September 2011, Norman Kamaru has accepted IDR1,000,000,000 (US$113,000) contract offer from the PT. Falcon Interactive. The terms of the contract require him to produce a single album, if he acts in a movie, he will receive another billion. That same month he tendered his resignation from the Indonesian National Police, citing the difficulty in finding time to perform; according to his mother, he had been arrested several times for performing "on the sidelines of his duty". After the Gorontalo police refused to accept his resignation, he went to the national police headquarters in Jakarta, where he was told that he could only resign if he repaid the cost of his training, as he had signed on for a ten-year contract, a spokesman for the police stated that the police force was "not like a bus shelter where people can just come and go whenever they want". The police later withdrew the demand and subsequently fired Norman Kamaru.

To create a new, more modern image, in April 2012, Norman Kamaru initial rap single 'Forget It' (Lupakan) and collaborate with rapper Saykoji.

In 2013, Norman Kamaru started a YouTube channel called "Noorman Camaru CHANNEL". He has started uploading videos regularly since then.

== Reception ==
Initially the police department intended to punish Norman Kamaru for his dancing, calling his behaviour "undisciplined and childish" as well as "unethical", noting that police officers should be ever vigilant when on duty. After performing for his superiors and mounting public support, the police relented, deciding instead to "channel his talents".

In response to the threatened police sanctions, Norman Kamaru received popular support. Noted singer and songwriter Glenn Fredly tweeted that the police should instead punish those who "call themselves singers but are unable to lip-sync as cool as Norman Kamaru", while legislator Eva Kusuma Sundari noted that actions like Norman Kamaru's were good public relations for the police. However, Alexia Cahyaningtyas of The Jakarta Globe, called it "embarrassing" that "a lip-syncing policeman was considered first-class entertainment".

Salingsilang.com, which records trends on Twitter, reported that Norman Kamaru was the biggest trending topic on Twitter in Indonesia during the first half of 2011, beating Justin Bieber and the death of Osama bin Laden. The original upload was viewed 200,000 times in its first week and by 5 April it had been "liked" 160,000 times it was only "disliked" 32 times in the same period. He was chosen as the most entertaining newsmaker of the year in the Seputar Indonesia Awards in May of that year.
