= Ateeq Hussain Khan =

Ateeq Hussain Khan Qawwal
- Born: 1980 (age 44–45); Hyderabad, Telangana, India
- Origin: India
- Genres: Qawwali
- Occupation(s): Qawwal, Indian Qawwali & classical Musical Artist
- Instrument: Harmonium
- Website: www.qawwal.in

Ustad Ateeq Hussain Khan Bandanawazi Al-Hashmi Qawwal (بنده نوازى قوال) (born 1980) is an Indian Qawwal.

He was born in Hyderabad, India. In a Shia Muslim Family. He started his training in Indian classical music (Hindustani shastria sangeeth) from his father from the early age of five years and participated along with him in Qawwali programs. He learned various forms of classical singing such as Bandish, Thumri, Bhajan Tarana Ghazal and others from his father, Ustad Iqbal Hussain Khan Bandanawazi.

His voice and style have a striking resemblance to his father. Several news papers in India and many countries have praised his talent. He has toured all over the world for Sufi Qawwali Programs. His Qawwali group is known as Bandanawazi Qawwal. In 2010, he performed at the Delhi Commonwealth games Program Jashn-e-Dilli and the Urdu Heritage Festival which was organised by the Delhi Govt. His memorable performances are at Hazrat Rumi, The Sufi Festival of India and at Sacred Music Festival Organized by Dalai Lama Organization.

In 1998, Bandanawazi Qawwal received sangeet ratna samman from the Maharashtra Art & Culture Department, by Sushilkumar Shinde.

== Family background ==
Ateeq Hussain Khan belongs to the seventh generation of Gwalior Gharana Ustad Haddu Hassu Khan, ancestor of Ateeq Hussain Khan and grandson of Ustad Qurban Hussain Khan. Ateeq's maternal grandfather is Padmashri Aziz Ahmed Khan Warsi from the Delhi Gharana. Ateeq Hussain Khan Bandanawazi's father is Iqbal Hussain Khan Bandanawazi. Ateeq Hussain Khan is the greatgrandchild of Ustad Faiyaz Khan Sahab the founder of Agra Gharana and nephew of Jafar Hussain Khan Badauni.

== Performances ==
He has Performed Qawwali in Kala Academy present 25th Bhakti Sangeeth Samahroh in Goa, at the Vasanta Habba Festival, and at World Sacred Music Festivals.

He has also performed Qawwali in many countries.
