= Wajd =

Islamic term for spiritual ecstasy

Wajd or wajad is a Sufi term for the religious ecstasy induced by dhikr (the remembrance of God) or by means of sama, listening to the measured recitation, signing or chanting of spiritual verses or poetry.

Sufi literature describes wajd as "states which come upon the heart unexpectedly." During wajd, one loses awareness of oneself and others, and an awareness of Allah descends upon the person. It can overwhelm the senses, causing extreme physical reactions. Wajd can manifest as intense joy, when one experiences Allah's beauty, or as intense grief, when experiencing Allah's Majesty. Experiences of wajd help Sufi seekers feel deeper feelings of longing and love.

== See also ==
- Wujud
