= Abdullah Manzoor Niazi =

Pakistani Qawwal (born 1960)

Abdullah Manzoor Niazi Qawwal
- Born: Abdullah Muhammad Manzoor Niazi; 1960 (age 65–66); Karachi
- Origin: Pakistan
- Genre: Qawwali
- Instrument: harmonium

Abdullah Muhammad Manzoor Niazi Qawwal is a Pakistani Qawwal. He was born in Karachi at 1960 and is the eldest son of Manzoor Niazi Qawwal. He belongs to Qawwal Bachchon ka Gharana of Delhi. He performed with his father Manzoor Niazi Qawwal, and over time took over more and more responsibility. After the death of his father Manzoor Niazi Qawwal, he became the lead Qawwal of the party, which included his Brothers. In 2015 he set up a new Qawwal party, with his sons Waqas Ahmed, Saad Ahmed, and Fahad Ahmed becoming the prime backup vocalists.

Abdullah Manzoor Niazi Qawwal performs various genres of Qawwali such as Thumri, Khayal, Tarana, Sufism, Classical. His performance style is steeped in Ameer Khusro's Kalaam and has a rigorous classicism. Abdullah Manzoor Niazi Qawwal carries the performance with a command and virtuosity rarely found in contemporary Qawwals. He manages to capture the musical emotionality of Khusro's poetry in all its subtlety and intensity.

== Early life ==
Abdullah Manzoor Niazi learned Qawwali from his father Manzoor Niazi Qawwal and his uncles Bahauddin Qawwal and Munshi Raziuddin.

== Career ==
Abdullah Manzoor Niazi started his singing career in his uncle & teacher Ustad Bahauddin Khan's band as a chorus singer. He later formed his own band with his father Ustad Manzoor Ahmed Niazi and elder brother Masroor Ahmed Niazi. He was occasionally assisted by his father as a lead singer in his band. Abdullah's nephew and Masroor Niazi's son Habib Ahmed Niazi later on assisted him as the second lead singer of the band, and occasionally as a supporting vocalist and chorus singer when Manzoor Ahmed Niazi assisted them as the main lead.

Abdullah Manzoor Niazi Qawwal has released many albums and has also recorded qawwalis for ARY Qtv, and Pakistan Television. In addition, he has recorded Qawwalis for South Africa's Radio Lotus (1989), Oslo Television (1991) and DoorDarshan of India.

Abdullah Manzoor Niazi started his international career with a successful tour of South Africa in 1989, which was his first international tour. He has performed in South Africa, USA, Canada, Norway, Denmark, Sweden, Dubai, Abu Dhabi, Muscat, India, Bangladesh, Saudi Arabia, Sri Lanka and many more.

In 2013, Abdullah Manzoor Niazi's Father And Legendary Qawwal Manzoor Ahmed Niazi Passed Away. After His Father Passed Away, Abdullah Niazi Became The Solo Head Of Their Qawwali Party And Was Assisted By His Nephew Habib Ahmed Niazi As Second Lead.

In addition, Abdullah Manzoor Niazi Qawwal had collaborated with Komal Rizvi for her song "Jhoolay Lal ", which was released by Saregama in 2013.

Abdullah Manzoor Niazi's major qawwalis include - Ya Jeelani Shainillah, Aap Hi Bula Lijiye Ya Nabi Madine Mei, Ghar Naari Ganwaari, Hare Jhande Ke Shehzaade, Kab Tak Mere Maula, and Man Mohan Hai Baanka Tera Jamaal Re Baghdaadi Saiyaan.

Abdullah Niazi's Nephew Habib Ahmed Niazi Has Now Formed His Own Qawwali Group. Thus, Abdullah Manzoor Niazi Is Still Leading The Band With His Son Waqas Niazi Assisting Him As The Second Lead Singer.

== Awards ==
Abdullah Manzoor Niazi has received the following awards.

- International Mystic Music Sufi Festival Award Presented to Abdullah Manzoor Niazi Qawwal (2007)
- ARY QTV Awards in the Category of Popular Qawwal (2010).

== See also ==
Abdullah Niazi Qawwal
