= Pandoke, Gujranwala =

Pandoke
- Village
- Location within Pakistan
- Coordinates: 32.16°N 73.51°E
- Country: Pakistan
- Province: Punjab
- District: Gujranwala
- Elevation: 201 m (659 ft)
- Time zone: UTC+5 (PST)

Pandoke is a village in Gujranwala District, Punjab, Pakistan. The village is part of Gujranwala Saddar Tehsil of the district. It is located at 32°16'30N 73°51'25E with an altitude of 201 metres (662 feet).
