= Pandoke, Lahore =

Pandoke
- Location within Pakistan
- Coordinates: 31.16°N 74.21°E
- Country: Pakistan
- Province: Punjab
- Elevation: 204 m (669 ft)
- Time zone: UTC+5 (PST)

Pandoke (Pandoki) is a village in Lahore District, Punjab, Pakistan. It is located at 32°16'50N 74°21'33E with an altitude of 204 metres (672 feet).

It is made famous by the reference to the great sufi poet Bulle Shah having moved in at age 6, and having received his early education from his father here.
