= Urban Qawwali =

Urban Qawwali (Urban Quwali)(Urban Quwalli) is a genre of music that fuses Sufi devotional music popular from South Asia mixed with Urban beats from the west.

Urban Qawwali's first emerged in the 1990s with DJs mixing Hip-Hop beats with Vocals from Qawwals and popular Sufi singers like Nusrat Fateh Ali Khan & Sabri Brothers

One of the first DJs/Producers to mix both genres of music was Bally Sagoo who had a close connection with the great Nusrat Fateh Ali Khan and released the album Magic Touch in 1993

Since 1993 many DJs/Producers/Bands have experimented with the style such as: Punjabi MC, Sukhshinda Shinda, Jinx, Pearl Jam, Shankar–Ehsaan–Loy, A R Rahman.
