= Wujud =

Term in Islamic philosophy and Sufism

Wujūd (Arabic: وجود) is an Arabic word typically translated to mean existence, presence, being, substance, or entity. However, in the religion of Islam, it tends to take on a deeper meaning. It has been said that everything gains its wujūd by being found or perceived by God.

== Sufi view ==
For those of the Sufi tradition, wujūd has more to do with the finding of God than the existence of God. Although wujūd is commonly translated as "existence", its original meaning is the "being found". This "being found" is sometimes described as the final stage of fanaa in which one is immersed in the existence or finding of God while all else is annihilated.

"For a Sufi, beyond the realization of the annihilation of the state of nonexistence, there is nothing except existence. There is nothing beyond this nothingness except survival and nothing in death but life. This annihilation implies eternal reunion, as well as existence in full positivity and glory."

== Relation to wajd ==
Wajd can be translated to mean 'ecstasy'. Wujud (which is described as ecstatic existentiality in this instance) is said to occur only after one goes beyond wajd. In other words, ecstasy does not lead to anything other than Being.

Wajd and Wujud can be better understood in terms of tawhid as well. Tawhid (or doctrine of Oneness of God) is described as a beginning and wujud as an end, with wajd being an intermediary between the two. Abu 'Ali ad-Daqqaq further explains: "Tawhīd entails the encompassing of the servant. Ecstasy (wajd) entails the immersion of the servant. Wujud entails the extinction of the servant."

The Sufis believe that anyone who experiences wajd brings back some residual knowledge from the object of his finding (wujud). Also, when one gains knowledge from experience, one must attempt to find a contraction to balance it. If one fails to do so, one remains at a lower level of knowledge.

== Philosophical view ==
Abū l-Qāsim al-Junayd reflects on existence by explaining: "When he seizes me with fear, he annihilates me from myself through my existence, then preserves me from myself... Through being made present I taste the flavor of my existence." He also states "The wujud (finding, experience, ecstasy, existence) of the real occurs though the loss of your self" The self is another major part of existence in Islamic philosophy. Many claim that the existence of the self is proof for the existence of the Other. This 'Other' is said to be the only Reality, meaning that "whatever 'is' other than the Other is nonexistent."

As 'Abd al-Karīm ibn Hawāzin al-Qushayrī puts it: "The first passing away is the passing away of the self and its attributes to endure through the attributes of the real. Then there is the passing away from the attributes of the real through witnessing of the real. Then there is a person's passing away from witnessing his own passing away through his perishing in the ecstatic existentiality (wujud) of the real"

There is also the view that there are two kinds of Being, corporeal and spiritual. Or, "one which is moved and one which causes motion, though itself unmoved"

== Wahdat al-wujūd ==
Wahdat al-wujūd or 'unity of being' can mean that "there is only one Being, and all existence is nothing but the manifestation or outward radiance of that One Being".

== Quotes ==
"Existence is not an inherent quality of essence, but only a predicate or an accident of essence"

"Absolute Majesty-Beauty, like sheer being-sheer possibility, forms the totality of wujud"
