= Mamta Joshi =

Indian singer

- Born: Chandigarh, India
- Occupations: Playback singer, sufi singer
- Years active: 2000–present

Mamta Joshi is an Indian Sufi singer from Chandigarh. She was awarded 'Ustad Bismillah Khan Yuva Puraskar' of Sangeet Natak Akademi (an autonomous body under the Ministry of Culture, Government of India) for the year 2015, for her notable talent in the field of Sufi and folk Music of Punjab. She is an assistant professor in Chandigarh.

She sings in Urdu, Punjabi, Hindi and other local languages. She performed live in her maiden US tour.

== Albums ==
- Amber De Taare
- Asan Ishq Namaaz
- Bhagat Singh
- Ik Taara
- Kamli De Saiyaan
- Maahi
- Naksha
- Saifal Malooq

== See also ==
- List of Sufi singers
