= Rabbi Shergill =

Indian musician (born 1972)

Rabbi Shergill ਰੱਬੀ ਸ਼ੇਰਗਿੱਲ
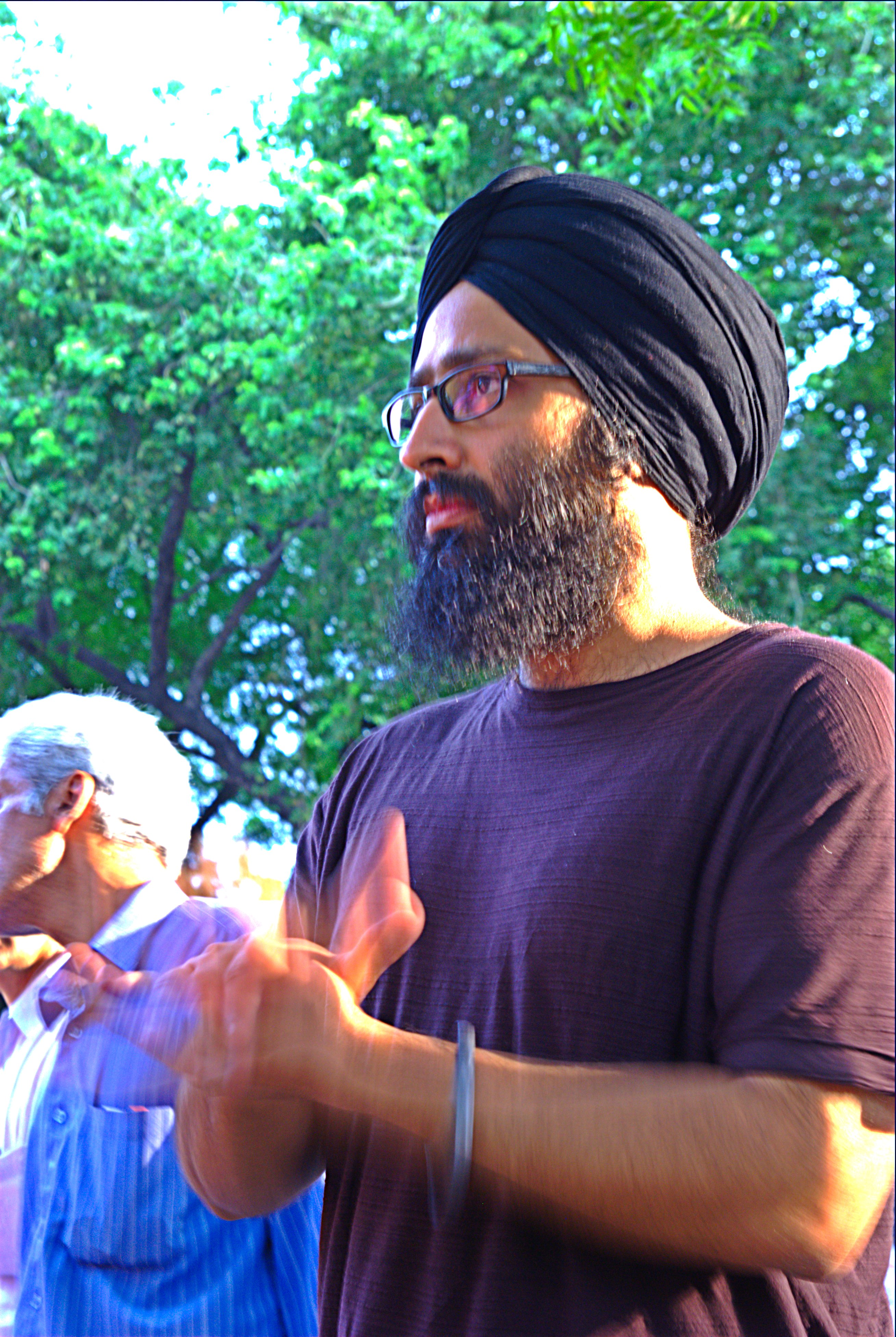
- Rabbi performing

Background information
- Born: Gurpreet Singh Shergill; 16 April 1972 (age 54)
- Origin: Delhi, India
- Genres: Punjabi, rock, sufi, Indipop
- Occupations: Singer, songwriter, guitarist
- Instruments: Vocals, guitar
- Years active: 2004 – present
- Labels: Odd One Out Records, Phat Phish, Yash Raj Music
- Website: www.rabbishergill.com

Rabbi Shergill (born Gurpreet Singh Shergill on 16 April 1972) is an Indian musician well known for his debut album Rabbi and the chart-topper song of 2004, Bullah Ki Jaana ("I don’t know who I am!"). His music has been described variously as rock, Punjabi, with a bani style melody, and Sufi-style (sufiana), and "semi-Sufi semi-folksy kind of music with a lot of Western arrangements." Shergill has been called "Punjabi music's true urban balladeer".

== Early life and education ==
Shergill was born to father who was a Sikh preacher and his mother was a college principal and also a Punjabi poet. He completed his schooling from Guru Harkrishan Public School, India Gate and graduation from Khalsa College, he went for further studies at the Fore School of Management but dropped out a year later.

== Career ==
After completing his college, Shergill formed a band named Kaffir. The band played in some competitions and college festivals before parting ways. Shergill initially composed jingles for advertisement agencies such as Yamaha RX-T motorbikes and Times FM. He had an unsuccessful stint with Sony Music and Tehelka before finally releasing his debut album Rabbi in 2004 under Phat Phish Records. Relying on word-of-mouth publicity and a music video, he had a chart topper song "Bullah Ki Jaana". Most of the songs in the album were composed and written by Shergill himself except for "Bullah Ki Jaana" based on the Kafi poem written by the Punjabi Sufi saint Bulleh Shah. "Heer" from "Heer" by Waris Shah and "Ishtihar" by Shiv Kumar Batalvi. Shergill had one song, "Dilli" which was used in the Hindi movie, Delhii Heights.

In October 2008, Shergill released his second album Avengi Ja Nahin under YRF Music. The album contains nine songs and deals with issues like communal violence, like the Bilkis Bano case expressing social responsibility and the need for "collective morality". He also appeared in MTV Unplugged (India) in 2011. He lent his voice to Yash Chopra's 2012 romantic film Jab Tak Hai Jaan singing the leading number "Challa" composed by A. R. Rahman and the lyrics penned by Gulzar. In March 2012, he released his third album III. In 2013, Shergill founded the independent label Odd One Out Records. Rabbi Shergill has been critical of current Punjabi singers who have taken Punjabi music and identity to the global stages such as Diljit Dosanjh., Shergill's major gripe being his generalization of popular Punjabi music as being Narcissist. While Shergill has had ardent fans himself, there are many who disagree with this generalization and instead blame it on Rabbi's unrevivable career lost because of his transition to Bollywood.

== Musical style ==
Shergill's principal contribution to music lies in the use of Punjabi — which previously had a reputation similar to that of either Bhangra or traditional folk — to create acoustic rock-based ballads, providing a new musical perspective to this language. And with his poetic, socially relevant lyrics and an adult alternative sound, Shergill instantly connected with an urban crowd who loved him for his genuine and original approach to his songs. His songs are deeply philosophical and blend archaic, almost lost, Punjabi phrases into more recent Indian rock music. Shergill's music has been inspired by Rock as well as Sufi and Punjabi folk music. His favourite musicians include Bruce Springsteen, Led Zeppelin, Aerosmith and Jimmy Page. He has also worked with award-winning mix engineer Gustavo Celis, who helped him out with some tracks for his album III. "Working with Celis — who has worked with artists including Beyonce, Shakira and Ricky Martin — was an amazing experience," he says.

== Personal life ==
Rabbi has four sisters. His sister Gagan Gill is a well known Hindi poet. Rabbi married an Italian and has two kids, a daughter and a son.

== Discography ==
=== Studio albums ===
- Rabbi (2004)
- Avengi Ja Nahin (2008)
- Rabbi III (2012)

=== Singles ===
- Tu Milen (2013)
- Taläsh (2019)
- Raj Singh (2019)
- Sahi Aeh Vi (2019)
- Pahilan (2020)
- Pahiläñ (2020)
- Par Parosani (2022)
- Hamahüñ Kä Khïläb (2022)
- Tu Hae Khubsurat (2023)
- Bulla at biella jazz club (2024)

=== Film soundtracks ===
- Waisa Bhi Hota Hai 2, "Laundiya Ke Pallu Mein" (2003)
- Delhii Heights, "Tere Bin", "Kitni Der" (2007)
- Dharti, "Bandiya Tu" (2011)
- Jab Tak Hai Jaan, "Challa" (2012)
- Raanjhanaa, "Tu Mon Shudi" (2013)
- Chaar Sahibzaade - Rise of Banda Singh Bahadur (2016)
- Romeo Akbar Walter, "Bulleya" (2019)
- Happy Hardy and Heer, "Aadat" (2020)
