= Wadali Brothers =

Sufi singers and musicians

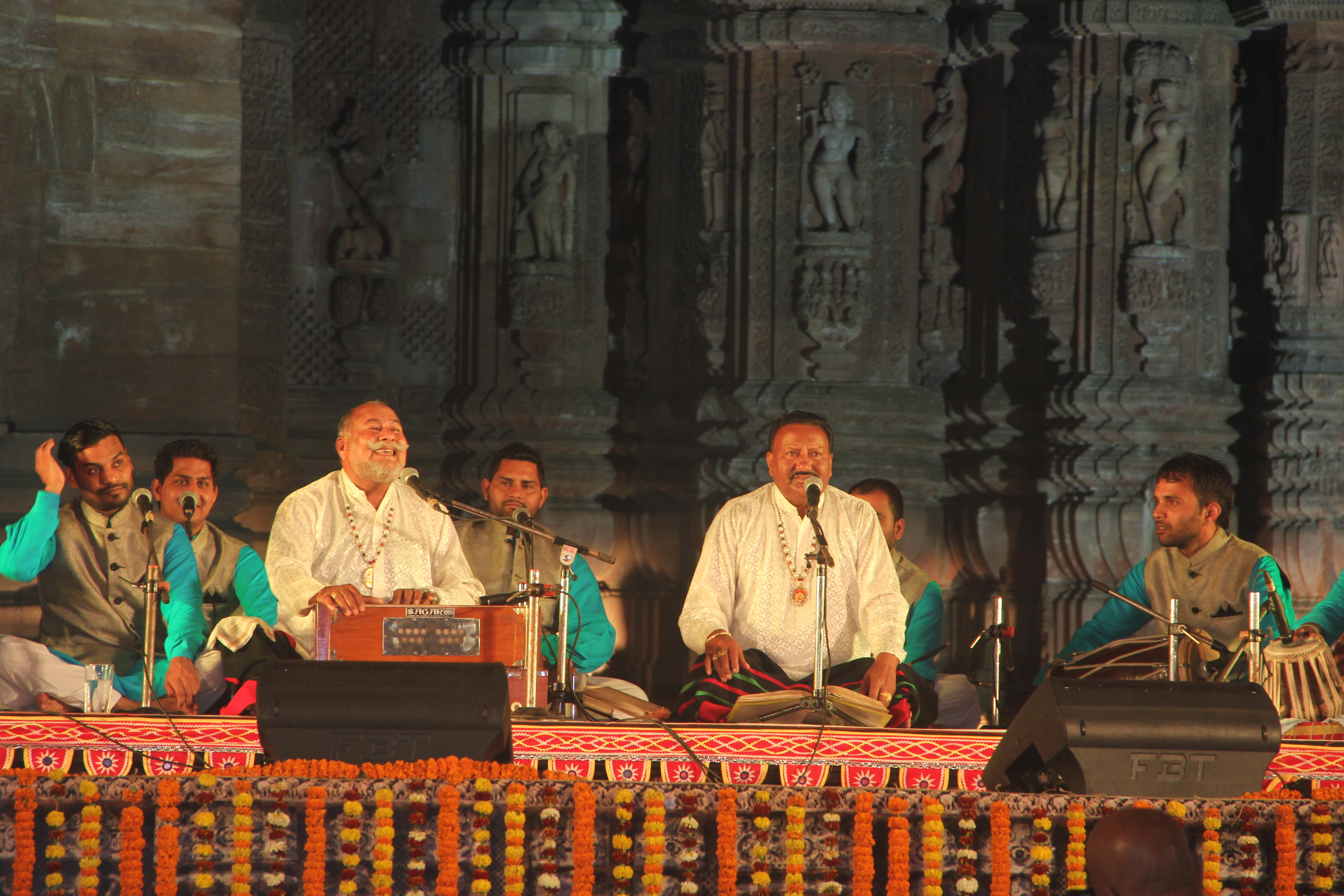
- Wadali brothers performing at the Raja Rani Music Festival. Puranchand Wadali (L) and Pyarelal Wadali (R)

Background information
- Origin: Amritsar, Punjab, India
- Genres: Sufi music, Folk
- Years active: 1975–present
- Past members: Pyarelal Wadali

The Wadali Brothers – Puranchand Wadali and Pyarelal Wadali – are Sufi singers and musicians from Guru Ki Wadali in the Amritsar District in Punjab, India. Pyarelal Wadali, the younger of the two died on 4 March 2018 at the age of 75 due to cardiac arrest at the Fortis Escorts Heart Institute, Amritsar.

Born into the fifth generation of musicians given to singing the messages of Sufi saints, the Wadali brothers dabbled in other professions before they became Sufi singers. While Puranchand Wadali, the elder brother, was a regular in an akhara (wrestling ring) for 25 years, Pyarelal contributed to the family income by playing the role of Krishan in the village Ras Lila.

== Early life ==
Their father, Thakur Das Wadali, compelled Puranchand to learn music. Puranchand studied music from celebrated masters such as Ustad Bade Ghulam Ali Khan of the Patiala Gharana. Pyarelal was trained by his elder brother, who he considered his guru and mentor up till his death.

== Career ==
Their first musical performance outside their village was in Harballabh Temple in Jalandhar. In 1975, the duo went to Jalandhar to perform at the Harballabh Sangeet Sammelan but was not allowed to sing because their appearance did not pass muster. Disappointed, they decided to make a musical offering at the Harballabh temple, where an executive of All India Radio, Jalandhar, spotted them and recorded their first song.

The Wadali Brothers sing in the gurbani, kafi, ghazal and bhajan genres of music. They live in their ancestral house in Guru Ki Wadali, and teach music to those who promise to preserve it. They do not charge their disciples, and lead a very simple life devoted to the divine one.

They believe in the Sufi tradition deeply. They consider themselves as a medium through which the preaching of great saints is passed on to others. They have never indulged commercially, and they have only a handful of recordings to their name (mostly from live concerts). They believe in singing freely as homage to the divine one. They do not feel very comfortable in using electronic gadgets in their music, and stress on Alap and Taans. They believe that spiritual heights can only be attained if you sing unreservedly, in a free atmosphere.

=== Bollywood ===
In 2003, they entered Bollywood, rendering music director and writer Gulzar’s soulful lyrics in their unique style in the film Pinjar. They also sang one song in Dhoop. On the cards is a documentary which the Discovery Channel is planning to make on them.

== Discography ==
- Aa Mil Yaar
- Paigham-E-Ishq,
- Ishq Musafir
- Folk Music of Punjab
- Yaad Piya Ki

== Filmography ==
- Pinjar (2003)
- Dhoop (2003)
- Chikku Bukku (2010, Tamil) Song: "Thooral Nindralum" Sung by: Hariharan, Wadali Brothers
- Tanu Weds Manu (2011)
- Mausam (2011)

== Awards ==
- Sangeet Natak Akademi Award, 1992.
- Tulsi Award, 1998.
- Punjab Sangeet Natak Akademi Award, 2003.
- Puranchand Wadali was awarded the Padma Shri award by the Government of India, 2005.
- Life Time Achievement Award 2015 in PTC awards in jalandhar
