= Delhi-6 (soundtrack) =

Soundtrack album by A. R. Rahman
- Released: 19 January 2009 (India)
- Recorded: Panchathan Record Inn and AM Studios
- Genre: Feature film soundtrack
- Length: 45:32
- Labels: T-Series; Sony Music India
- Producer: A. R. Rahman

A. R. Rahman chronology
Slumdog Millionaire (2008)	Delhi-6 (2009)	Blue (2009)

Singles from Delhi-6 : Music From The Motion Picture
- 1. "Masakali" Released: 14 January 2009

Delhi-6 is the soundtrack album to Rakeysh Omprakash Mehra's 2009 film of the same name. A. R. Rahman scored the film, collaborating a second time with Mehra after Rang De Basanti, and Prasoon Joshi penned the lyrics. The music was released on 19 January 2009 at the Indian Idol 4 competition.

== Development and release ==
The video of the first song "Masakali" was released featuring lead actors Abhishek Bachchan and Sonam Kapoor with a dove. However, the music video was not part of the original final cut of the film. According to the director Mehra, "the song was not really meant to be part of the narrative. I mean, who would think of putting in a song about a dove in a film like Delhi-6? It just happened. When I came to the pre-climax portion of my script, I was stuck. I needed a continuity link taking the narrative to its finale".

Other videos released include the title track Delhi-6, the romantic interlude "Rehna Tu" as well as the folky "Genda Phool", an adaptation of a folk song from Chhattisgarh. Rajat Dholakia who is known for introducing Chhattisgarhi folk songs to Bollywood has been co credited with Rahman for the song Genda Phool. The music of the track "Bhor Bhaye" is based on the raga, Gujri Todi. It is an adaptation of Bade Ghulam Ali Khan's original version, arranged by Rahman. Traditional lyrics have been used there by Joshi. The Ustad (whose demise took place in 1968) did not record this song separately for the film soundtrack. Shreya Ghoshal's vocals have been superimposed on the Ustad's vocals (from his original song) at parts.

== Reception ==
Professional ratings
Review scores
Source	Rating
Rediff	4.5/5 stars
PlanetBollywood.com	10/10 stars
Bollywood Hungama	4/5 stars

The album received positive response. A review on Bollywood Hungama said, "Delhi 6 is near perfect. Rahman beats his own score with Delhi 6 which would easily go down as one of his best scores till date." According to Rediff's Sukanya Verma, "A. R. Rahman makes waiting for his music such a worthwhile chore what with one fantastic soundtrack after another. Close on the heels of a deserving Golden Globes wins follows the anticipated score of Rakeysh Omprakash Mehra's Delhi 6. Considering its impossible-to-define Chandni Chowk roots, Rahman injects the sounds of this 10-tracked album with an eclectic fusion of various genres."

== Track listing ==
The official track listing.

No.	Title	Artist(s)	Length
1.	"Masakali"	Mohit Chauhan	4:50
2.	"Arziyan"	Javed Ali, Kailash Kher	8:41
3.	"Dilli-6" (French Lyrics by Vivian Chaix, Claire)	Blaaze, Benny Dayal, Tanvi Shah, Vivian Chaix, Claire	3:36
4.	"Rehna Tu"	A. R. Rahman, Tanvi Shah, Benny Dayal	6:51
5.	"Hey Kaala Bandar"	Karthik, Naresh Iyer, Srinivas, Bonnie Chakraborty, Ember	5:52
6.	"Genda Phool" (Co composer Rajat Dholakia)	Rekha Bhardwaj, Shrraddha Pandit, Sujata Mazumder, Mahathi	2:50
7.	"Dil Gira Dafatan"	Ash King, Chinmayi Sripaada	5:39
8.	"Bhor Bhaye" (Raag: Gujri Todi)	Shreya Ghoshal, Ustad Bade Ghulam Ali Khan	3:19
9.	"Aarti (Tumre Bhavan Mein)"	Rekha Bhardwaj, Kishori Ashok Gowariker, Shrraddha Pandit, Sujata Mazumder	3:01
10.	"Noor" (Recital)	Amitabh Bachchan	0:50

== Awards ==
Filmfare Awards

- Won, Best Music Direction - A. R. Rahman
- Won, Best Male Playback - Mohit Chauhan for "Masakali"
- Won, Best Female Playback - Rekha Bhardwaj for "Genda Phool"
- Nominated, Best Male Playback - Javed Ali for "Arziyan"
- Nominated, Best Male Playback - Kailash Kher for "Arziyan"
- Nominated, Best Lyrics - Prasoon Joshi for "Rehna Tu"
- Nominated, Best Lyrics - Prasoon Joshi for "Masakali"

2nd Mirchi Music Awards

- Won, Song of The Year - "Masakali"
- Won, Album of The Year - A.R Rahman, Prasoon Joshi
- Won, Male Vocalist of The Year - Mohit Chauhan for "Masakali"
- Won, Female Vocalist of The Year - Rekha Bhardwaj for "Genda Phool"
- Won, Music Composer of The Year - A.R Rahman for "Masakali"
- Won, Lyricist of The Year - Prasoon Joshi for "Masakali"
- Won, Best Song Arranger & Programmer - A.R Rahman for "Masakali"
- Won, Best Song Mixing & Engineering - H. Sridhar, S. Sivakumar, P. A. Deepak and Vivianne Chaix for "Dilli-6"

Star Screen Awards

- Won, Best Music Direction - A. R. Rahman
- Nominated, Best Female Playback - Rekha Bhardwaj for "Genda Phool"
- Nominated, Best Male Playback - Mohit Chauhan for "Masakkali"

International Indian Film Academy Awards

- Nominated, Best Music Direction - A. R. Rahman
- Nominated, Best Lyrics - Prasoon Joshi
- Nominated, Best Female Playback - Rekha Bhardwaj for "Genda Phool"
- Nominated, Best Male Playback - Mohit Chauhan for "Masakkali"
