= List of songs recorded by Mohit Chauhan =

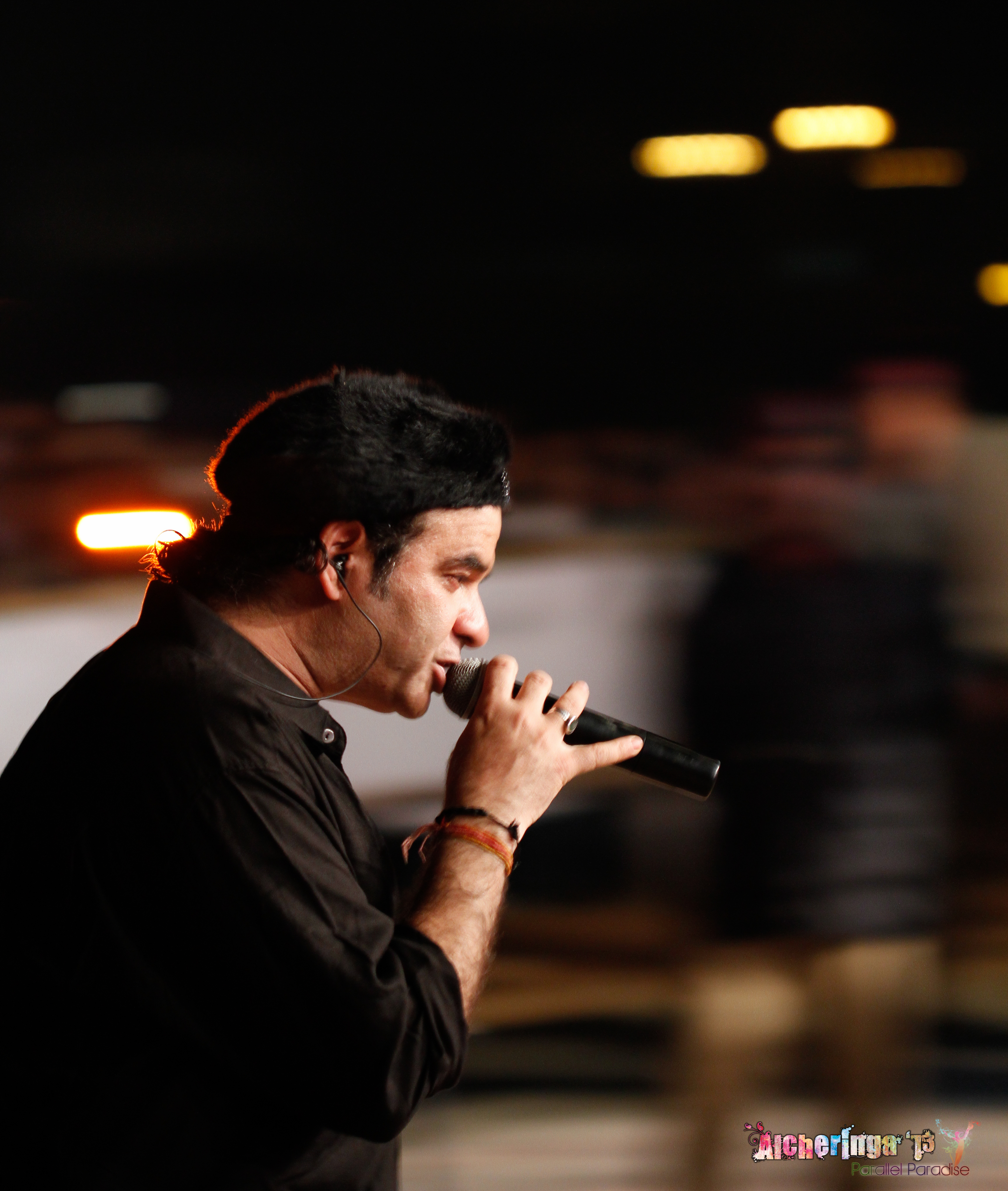
- Category: Songs
| Hindi Film Songs | 216 |
| Hindi Non-Film songs | 109 |
| Bengali Film Songs | 3 |
| Telugu Songs | 8 |
| Tamil Songs | 10 |
| Punjabi Songs | 4 |
| Marathi Songs | 3 |
| Kannada Songs | 2 |
| Gujarati Songs | 2 |
| Himachali Songs | 2 |
| Uttarakhandi Songs | 1 | |
| Total | 360 |

Mohit Chauhan made his Bollywood debut with the Sandesh Sandilya composition "Pehli Nazar Me Dari Thi", from the film Road, which was released in 2002. Chauhan rose to prominence with the release of the song "Khoon Chala" from Rang De Basanti (2006) and "Tum Se Hi" from Jab We Met (2007). He allied with Pritam, singing one tracks for each film: Kismat Konnection, New York, and Love Aaj Kal. The duo collaborated with Emraan Hashmi, performing "Is Jahan Mein", "Pee Loon" and "Rab Ka Shukrana". Moreover, he allied with Ranbir Kapoor for "Rockstar" which was composed by A. R. Rahman. Apart from rendering "Kuchh Khaas", the year 2008 marked his first collaborations with Salim–Sulaiman and Anu Malik by singing the songs "Yaad Teri Aaye" for "Tere Bina Jee Na Lage", and "Pyar Karna Na Tha" for the latter. In 2012, Chauhan worked with Sajid–Wajid for the first time, performing a track from Ajab Gazabb Love, and in 2014 the songs "Rabba" and "Tabah".

== Hindi songs ==
Key
| † | Denotes films that have not yet been released |

=== 1999 ===
| Film | Song | Composer(s) | Writer(s) | Co-singer(s) | Ref. |
|---|---|---|---|---|---|
| Split Wide Open | "Dooba Dooba" | Mohit Chauhan; Kem Trivedi; Atul Mittal | Mohit Chauhan; Kem Trivedi; Atul Mittal | solo | |

=== 2000 ===
| Film | Song | Composer(s) | Writer(s) | Co-singer(s) | Ref. |
|---|---|---|---|---|---|
| Dresanded Moresd Luv Story | "Koi Poocche" | Mohit Chauhan | Prasoon Joshi | | |
| | "Jadu Tona" | | | | |

=== 2001 ===
| Film | Song | Composer(s) | Writer(s) | Co-singer(s) | Ref. |
|---|---|---|---|---|---|
| Khiladi 528 | "Ganga Nahaley" | Mohit Chauhan | Mohit Chauhan | solo | |

=== 2002 ===
| Film | Song | Composer(s) | Writer(s) | Co-singer(s) | Ref. |
|---|---|---|---|---|---|
| Road | "Pehli Nazar Mein" | Sandesh Shandilya | Makrand Deshpande | Sunidhi Chauhan | |

=== 2003 ===
| Film | Song | Composer(s) | Writer(s) | Co-singer(s) | Ref. |
|---|---|---|---|---|---|
| Main Madhuri Dixit Banna Chahti Hoon | "Rumi Saab" | Amar Mohile | Nitin Raikwar | Amar Chaudhry, Manoj Mishra, Sameer Siddiqui, Suresh Debu | |
| Kyon | Kya Tum Chale Jaaoge | | | | |

=== 2004 ===
| Film | Song | Composer(s) | Writer(s) | Co-singer(s) | Ref. |
|---|---|---|---|---|---|
| Let's Enjoy | "Sabse Peeche Hum Khade" | Ankur Tewari | Ankur Tewari | | |
| | "Sabse Peeche Hum Khade" Album Version | Mohit Chauhan; Kem Trivedi; Atul Mittal; Kenny Puri; Vishal Dixit | Mohit Chauhan; Kem Trivedi; Atul Mittal; Kenny Puri; Vishal Dixit | | |

=== 2005 ===
| Film | Song | Composer(s) | Writer(s) | Co-singer(s) | Ref. |
|---|---|---|---|---|---|
| Main, Meri Patni Aur Woh | "Paintra" | Mohit Chauhan | Rocky Khanna | | |
| Main, Meri Patni Aur Woh | "Guncha" | Mohit Chauhan | Rocky Khanna | | |
| Main, Meri Patni Aur Woh | "Guncha" (Unplugged Version) | Mohit Chauhan | Rocky Khanna | | |

=== 2006 ===
| Film | Song | Composer(s) | Writer(s) | Co-singer(s) | Ref. |
|---|---|---|---|---|---|
| Adharm | "Agra" | Rajendra Shiv | Sameer | Naeem Shameen Ajmeri | |
| Adharm | "Rowan Akhiyan Dil Ghabraye" | Rajendra Shiv | Sameer | | |
| Rang De Basanti | "Khoon Chala" | A.R. Rahman | Prasoon Joshi | | |

=== 2007 ===
| Film | Song | Composer(s) | Writer(s) | Co-singer(s) | Ref. |
|---|---|---|---|---|---|
| Jab We Met | Tum Se Hi | Pritam | Irshad Kamil | | |
| Jab We Met | "Tum Se Hi" (Remix Version) | Pritam | Irshad Kamil | | |

=== 2008 ===
| Film | Song | Composer(s) | Writer(s) | Co-singer(s) | Ref. |
|---|---|---|---|---|---|
| EMI | "Ankhon Hi Ankhon Mein" | Chirantan Bhatt | Sarim Momin | | |
| Fashion | "Kuch Khaas" | Salim–Sulaiman | Irfan Siddiqui | Neha Bhasin | |
| Fashion | "Kuch Khaas" (Remix Version) | Salim–Sulaiman | Irfan Siddiqui | Neha Bhasin | |
| Kismat Konnection | "Is This Love (Kahin Naa Laage)" | Pritam | Sayeed Quadri | Shreya Ghoshal | |
| Kismat Konnection | "Is This Love (Kahin Naa Laage)" (Remix Version) | Pritam | Sayeed Quadri | Shreya Ghoshal | |
| Ugly Aur Pagli | "Yaad Teri Aaye" | Anu Malik | Amitabh Verma | | |
| Welcome to Sajjanpur | "Ek Meetha Marz Dene" | Shantanu Moitra | Swanand Kirkire | Madhushree | |
| Bolt (Disney Animated Film) "Hindi Version" | I Thought I Lost You "Hindi Version" | | | | |
| Meeting Se Meeting Tak | "Aaj Nache" | Mithoon | | Sukhwinder Singh, Shreya Ghoshal | |

=== 2009 ===
| Film | Song | Composer(s) | Writer(s) | Co-singer(s) | Ref. |
|---|---|---|---|---|---|
| 8 x 10 Tasveer | "Haafiz Khuda" | Salim–Sulaiman | Irfan Siddiqui | Tulsi Kumar | |
| 8 x 10 Tasveer | "Haafiz Khuda" (Remix Version) | Salim–Sulaiman | Irfan Siddiqui | Tulsi Kumar | |
| 8 x 10 Tasveer | "Kuchh Iss Tarah" | Salim–Sulaiman | Irfan Siddiqui | Tulsi Kumar | |
| 8 x 10 Tasveer | "Kuchh Iss Tarah" (Remix Version) | Salim–Sulaiman | Irfan Siddiqui | Tulsi Kumar | |
| Delhi-6 | "Masakali" | A.R. Rahman | Prasoon Joshi | | |
| Kaminey | "Pehli Baar Mohabbat" | Vishal Bhardwaj | Gulzar | | |
| Let's Dance - Sirf Ek Bahana Chahiye | "Jaana Hai" | Vipin Mishra | Vipin Dhyani | | |
| Love Aaj Kal | "Dooriyan" | Pritam | Irshad Kamil | | |
| New York | "Tune Jo Naa Kaha" | Pritam | Sandeep Srivastava | | |
| Sikandar | "Gulon Mein" (Serene Version) | Justin-Uday | Neelesh Misra | | |
| Tum Mile | "Is Jahaan Mein" | Pritam | Sayeed Quadri | | |

=== 2010 ===
| Film | Song | Composer(s) | Writer(s) | Co-singer(s) | Ref. |
|---|---|---|---|---|---|
| Aashayein | "Chala Aaya Pyaar" | Salim–Sulaiman | Mir Ali Husain | | |
| Anjaana Anjaani | "Tujhe Bhula Diya" | Vishal–Shekhar | Kumaar, Vishal Dadlani | Shekhar Ravjiani, Shruti Pathak | |
| Anjaana Anjaani | "Tujhe Bhula Diya" (Remix Version) | Vishal–Shekhar | Kumaar, Vishal Dadlani | Shekhar Ravjiani, Shruti Pathak | |
| Badmaash Company | "Jingle Jingle" | Pritam | Anvita Dutt Guptan | Master Saleem, Monali Thakur, Fahid | |
| Crook | "Tujhko Jo Paaya (Unplugged)" | Pritam | Kumaar | | |
| Dus Tola | "Aisa Hota Tha" | Sandesh Shandilya | Gulzar | | |
| Isi Life Mein | "Isi Umar Mein" | Meet Bros Anjjan | Manoj Muntashir | Shreya Ghoshal | |
| Isi Life Mein | "Isi Umar Mein" (Unplugged Version) | Meet Bros Anjjan | Manoj Muntashir | | |
| Lafangey Parindey | "Mann Lafanga", "Mann Lafanga (Club Mix)" | R. Anandh | Swanand Kirkire | | |
| Once Upon A Time In Mumbaai | "Pee Loon" (Male) Part 1" | Pritam | Irshad Kamil | | |
| Once Upon A Time In Mumbaai | "Pee Loon" (Male) Part 2" | Pritam | Irshad Kamil | | |
| Once Upon A Time In Mumbaai | "Pee Loon" (Male) Part 3" | Pritam | Irshad Kamil | | |
| Once Upon A Time In Mumbaai | "Pee Loon" (Remix) (Male) Part 1" | Pritam | Irshad Kamil | | |
| Once Upon A Time In Mumbaai | "Pee Loon" (Remix) (Male) Part 2" | Pritam | Irshad Kamil | | |
| Once Upon A Time In Mumbaai | "Pee Loon" (Remix) (Male) Part 3" | Pritam | Irshad Kamil | | |
| Raajneeti | "Bheegi Si Bhaagi Si" | Pritam | Irshad Kamil | Antara Mitra | |
| Robot (D) | "Pagal Anukan" | A. R. Rahman | Swanand Kirkire | Shreya Ghoshal | |
| Well Done Abba | "Hum Toh Apni Bawdi Lenge" | Shantanu Moitra | Ashok Mishra | Swanand Kirkire | |

=== 2011 ===
| Film | Song | Composer(s) | Writer(s) | Co-singer(s) | Ref. |
|---|---|---|---|---|---|
| Aarakshan | "Achha Lagta Hai" | Shankar–Ehsaan–Loy | Prasoon Joshi | Shreya Ghoshal | |
| Chillar Party | "Chatte Batte" | Amit Trivedi | Nitesh Tiwari | Armaan Malik, Gaurika Rai, Keshav Rai | |
| Chillar Party | "Chatte Batte" (Sad Version) | Amit Trivedi | Nitesh Tiwari | | |
| Dil Toh Baccha Hai Ji | "Abhi Kuch Dino Se" | Pritam | Neelesh Misra | | |
| Dum Maaro Dum | "Te Amo" (Reprise Version) | Pritam | Jaideep Sahni | | |
| Kucch Luv Jaisaa | "Naina" | Pritam | Irshad Kamil | Monali Thakur | |
| Love U...Mr. Kalakaar! | "Kahin Se Chali Aa" | Sandesh Shandilya | Manoj Muntashir | Shivangi Kashyap | |
| Pappu Can't Dance Saala | "Zindagi" | Malhar | Amitabh Bhattacharya, Saurabh Shukla | Akriti Kakar | |
| Rockstar | "Phir Se Udd Chala" | A.R. Rahman | Irshad Kamil | | |
| Rockstar | "Jo Bhi Main" | A.R. Rahman | Irshad Kamil | | |
| Rockstar | "Sherawali Jagdambe Maa" | A.R. Rahman | Irshad Kamil | | |
| Rockstar | "Kun Faya Kun" | A.R. Rahman | Irshad Kamil | A.R. Rahman, Javed Ali, Nizami Brothers | |
| Rockstar | "Sheher Mein" | A.R. Rahman | Irshad Kamil | Karthik | |
| Rockstar | "Hawa Hawaa" | A.R. Rahman | Irshad Kamil | (Additional Vocals: Viviane Chaix, Tanvi Shah, Suvi Suresh, Shalini) | |
| Rockstar | "Aur Ho" | A.R. Rahman | Irshad Kamil | Alma Ferovic | |
| Rockstar | "Naadaan Parindey" | A.R. Rahman | Irshad Kamil | A.R. Rahman | |
| Rockstar | "Tum Ho" | A.R. Rahman | Irshad Kamil | Suzanne D'Mello | |
| Rockstar | "Sadda Haq" | A.R. Rahman | Irshad Kamil | Clinton Cerejo, Arpit Gupta | |
| Shakal Pe Mat Ja | "Meherbaan" | Salim–Sulaiman | Shraddha Pandit | Gulraj Singh, Salim Merchant | |
| Tanu Weds Manu | "Yun Hi" | Ujjaini | Rajshekhar | | |
| Teen Thay Bhai | "Main Chalna Bhool Gaya" | Ranjit Barot, Sukhwinder Singh | Gulzar | | |
| Zindagi Na Milegi Dobara | "Khaabon Ke Parinday" | Shankar–Ehsaan–Loy | Javed Akhtar | Alyssa Mendonsa | |

=== 2012 ===
| Film | Song | Composer(s) | Writer(s) | Co-singer(s) | Ref. |
|---|---|---|---|---|---|
| 3 (Dubbed version) | "Po Nee Po (The Pain of Love)" | Anirudh Ravichander | Dhanush | Anirudh Ravichander | |
| Ajab Gazabb Love | "Tu" | Sajid–Wajid | Kausar Munir | | |
| Barfi! | "Ala Barfi" | Pritam | Swanand Kirkire | | |
| Bol Bachchan | "Jab Se Dekhi Hai" | Himesh Reshammiya | Sameer | | |
| Bol Bachchan | "Jab Se Dekhi Hai" (Remix Version) | Himesh Reshammiya | Sameer | | |
| Ek Tha Tiger | "Saiyaara" | Sohail Sen | Kausar Munir | Tarannum Mallik | |
| Ek Tha Tiger | "Ek Tha Tiger - Mashup" | Sohail Sen | Kausar Munir | Tarannum Mallik | |
| From Sydney with Love | "Ho Jaayega" | Sohail Sen | Anvita Dutt Guptan | Monali Thakur | |
| From Sydney with Love | "Ho Jaayega" (Love In Paradise Mix) | Sohail Sen | Anvita Dutt Guptan | Monali Thakur | |
| Gali Gali Chor Hai | "Suno Suno" | Anu Malik | Rahat Indori | Anmol Malik | |
| Jab Tak Hai Jaan | "Saans" | A.R. Rahman | Gulzar | Shreya Ghoshal | |
| Jannat 2 | "Rab Ka Shukrana" | Pritam | Sanjay Masoom | | |
| Players | "Dil Ye Bekarar Kyun Hai" | Pritam | Ashish Pandit | Shreya Ghoshal | |
| Players | "Dil Ye Bekarar Kyun Hai" (Remix Version) | Pritam | Ashish Pandit | Shreya Ghoshal | |
| Qasam Se Qasam Se | "Tujhe Paya Toh" | Shailendra-Sayanti | Dr. Moauzzam Azam, Panchhi Jalonvi | | |
| Qasam Se Qasam Se | "Zindagi Keh Rahi Hai" | Shailendra-Sayanti | Dr. Moauzzam Azam, Panchhi Jalonvi | | |
| Shirin Farhad Ki Toh Nikal Padi | "Kukuduku" | Jeet Gannguli | Amitabh Bhattacharya | | |
| Tere Naal Love Ho Gaya | "Jeene De" | Sachin–Jigar | Priya Panchal | | |
| Tere Naal Love Ho Gaya | "Jeene De" (Coffee House Version) | Sachin–Jigar | Priya Panchal | | |
| Tezz | "Main Hoon Shab" | Sajid–Wajid | Shabbir Ahmed | | |
| Yeh Jo Mohabbat Hai | "Pyar Karna Na Tha" (Male Version) | Anu Malik | Anand Bakshi | | |
| Yeh Jo Mohabbat Hai | "Tere Bina Jee Naa Lage" | Anu Malik | Kausar Munir | Suzanne D'Mello | |

=== 2013 ===
| Film | Song | Composer(s) | Writer(s) | Co-singer(s) | Ref. |
|---|---|---|---|---|---|
| Matru Ki Bijlee Ka Mandola | "Oye Boy Charlie" | Vishal Bhardwaj | Gulzar | Vishal Bhardwaj, Rekha Bhardwaj, Shankar Mahadevan | |
| ABCD: Any Body Can Dance | "Bezubaan" | Sachin–Jigar | Mayur Puri | Priya Panchal, Abhishek Azaad, Tanvi Shah, Deane Sequeira | |
| Bombay Talkies | "Apna Bombay Talkies" | Amit Trivedi | Swanand Kirkire | Udit Narayan, Alka Yagnik, Kumar Sanu, Abhijeet, S. P. Balasubrahmanyam, Kavita Krishnamurthy, Sudesh Bhonsle, Shreya Ghoshal, Shaan, Sunidhi Chauhan, Sukhwinder Singh, KK, Mohit Chauhan, Sonu Nigam | |
| Bombay Talkies | "Akkad Bakkad" | Amit Trivedi | Swanand Kirkire | | |
| Boyss Toh Boyss Hain | "Sab Kuchh Badal Gaya" | Shailendra-Sayanti | Panchhi Jalonvi | Sayanti | |
| Dhoom 3 | "Tu Hi Junoon" | Pritam | Kausar Munir | | |
| Issaq | "Issaq Tera" (Male Version) | Sachin–Jigar | Mayur Puri | | |
| Issaq | "Issaq Tera" (Duet Version) | Sachin–Jigar | Mayur Puri | Smita Nair Jain | |
| Jolly LLB | "Ajnabi" | Krsna | Subhash Kapoor | Shreya Ghoshal | |
| Krrish 3 | "You Are My Love" | Rajesh Roshan | Sameer | Alisha Chinai | |
| Kyun Hua Achanak | "Aa Gaye Hum" | Rajendra Shiv | Ravi Chopra | | |
| Mickey Virus | "Aankhon Hi Aankhon Ne" (Duet Version) | Hanif Shaikh | Manoj Yadav | Palak Muchhal | |
| Ramaiya Vastavaiya | "Peecha Chhute" | Sachin–Jigar | Priya Panchal | | |
| Shortcut Romeo | "Khali Salam Dua" | Himesh Reshammiya | Shabbir Ahmed | | |
| Shuddh Desi Romance | "Tere Mere Beech Mein" | Sachin–Jigar | Jaideep Sahni | Sunidhi Chauhan | |
| Yeh Jawaani Hai Deewani | "Ilahi" (Reprise Version) | Pritam | Amitabh Bhattacharya | | |
| Zila Ghaziabad | "Tu Hai Rab Mera" | Amjad–Nadeem | Shabbir Ahmed | Tulsi Kumar | |

=== 2014 ===
| Film | Song | Composer(s) | Writer(s) | Co-singer(s) | Ref. |
|---|---|---|---|---|---|
| Bewakoofiyaan | "Rumaani Sa" | Raghu Dixit | Anvita Dutt Guptan | Shreya Ghoshal | |
| Ekkees Toppon Ki Salaami | "Bitua" | Ram Sampath | Sandeep Nath | | |
| Heartless | "Heartless" | Gaurav Dagaonkar | Seema Saini | | |
| Heartless | "What A Feeling" | Gaurav Dagaonkar | Shekhar Suman | Sukanya Ghosh | |
| Heropanti | "Rabba" | Sajid–Wajid | Kausar Munir | | |
| Heropanti | "Tabah" | Sajid–Wajid | Kausar Munir | | |
| Heropanti | "Tabah" (Remix Version) | Sajid–Wajid | Kausar Munir | | |
| Kaanchi: The Unbreakable | "Hindustan Kahan Hai" | Salim–Sulaiman | Irshad Kamil | Sukhwinder Singh, Raj Pandit | |
| Mary Kom | "Teri Baari" | Shashi Suman | Prashant Ingole | | |
| Shaadi Ke Side Effects | "Bawla Sa Sapna" | Pritam | Swanand Kirkire | | |
| Tamanchey | "Khamakha" (Mohit Version) | Krsna | Krsna | | |
| The Xposé | "Catch Me If You Can" | Himesh Reshammiya | Sameer | Himesh Reshammiya, Mika Singh, Neeti Mohan, Shubhangi Tiwari, Shalmali Kholgade | |
| The Xposé | "Catch Me If You Can" (Remix Version) | Himesh Reshammiya | Sameer | Himesh Reshammiya, Mika Singh, Neeti Mohan, Shubhangi Tiwari, Shalmali Kholgade | |
| The Xposé | "The Xpose Mashup" | Himesh Reshammiya | Sameer, Shabbir Ahmed, Kumaar | Himesh Reshammiya, Yo Yo Honey Singh, Mika Singh, Mohammed Irfan, Neeti Mohan, Palak Muchhal, Ankit Tiwari, Shubhangi Tiwari, Shalmali Kholgade, Rekha Bhardwaj | |
| Trip to Bhangarh | "Slow Motion" | Onkar Singh | Manish Chaudhary | | |

=== 2015 ===
| Film | Song | Composer(s) | Writer(s) | Co-singer(s) | Ref. |
|---|---|---|---|---|---|
| Hawaizaada | "Daak Ticket" | Rochak Kohli | Vibhu Puri | Javed Bashir | |
| Hawaizaada | "Maazaa My Lord" | Mangesh Dhakde | Vibhu Puri | Neeti Mohan | |
| Badmashiyaan | "Thode Se Hum" | Bobby–Imran | Shabbir Ahmed | | |
| NH10 | "Le Chal Mujhe" (Male Version) | Bann Chakraborty | Bann Chakraborty, Abhiruchi Chand | | |
| NH10 | "Khoney De" | Bann Chakraborty | Bann Chakraborty | Neeti Mohan | |
| Ek Paheli Leela | "Khuda Bhi" | Tony Kakkar | Manoj Muntashir | | |
| Ek Paheli Leela | "Khuda Bhi" (DJ AKS Remix) | Tony Kakkar | Manoj Muntashir | | |
| Ishqedarriyaan | "Das Dae" | Jaidev Kumar | Kumaar | | |
| Bombay Velvet | "Behroopia" | Amit Trivedi | Amitabh Bhattacharya | Neeti Mohan | |
| Bezubaan Ishq | "Ankhon Me Basa Lunga" | Rupesh Verma | Jashwant Gangani | | |
| Bezubaan Ishq | "Teri Meri Ankahi Dastan" | Rupesh Verma | Jashwant Gangani | Shreya Ghoshal | |
| Bajrangi Bhaijaan | "Chicken Song" | Pritam Chakraborty | Mayur Puri | Palak Muchhal | |
| Hero | "Khoya Khoya" | Sachin–Jigar | Niranjan Iyenger | Priya Panchal, Arpita Chakraborty, Tanishka Sanghvi | |
| Pyaar Ka Punchnama 2 | "Heeriye" | Hitesh Sonik | Hitesh Sonik | | |
| Tamasha | Matargasti | A. R. Rahman | Irshad Kamil | | |
| Guddu Ki Gun | "Rehbra Ve" | Gajendra-Vikram | Aseem Ahmad Abbasse | Shweta Pandit | |
| Yevade Subramanyam | "Idhera" | | | | |

=== 2016 ===
| Film | Song | Composer(s) | Writer(s) | Co-singer(s) | Ref. |
|---|---|---|---|---|---|
| Shivaay | "Bolo Har Har" "Bolo Har Har - Refix" | Mithoon | Sandeep Shrivastava | Baadshah, Sukhwinder Singh, Mithoon, Megha Sriram Dalton, Anugrah, The Vamps | |
| Sultan | "Sachi Muchi" | Vishal–Shekhar | Irshad Kamil | Harshdeep Kaur | |
| 1920 London | "Rootha Kyun" | Sharib Sabri, Toshi Sabri | Azim Shirazi | Payal Dev | |
| Fuddu | "Fuddu Ka Jalwa" | Rana Mazumder | Arbind Kaushal | | |
| Ishq Junoon | "Sirf Tu" | Aanjan Bhattacharya | Sanjeev Chaturvedi | | |
| Hai Apna Dil Toh Awara | "Meheram Mere" | Ajay Singha | Mohit Pathak | | |
| Babuji Ek Ticket Bambai | "Bepanhaa Tum Ko Chahe (Version-1)" "Bepanhaa Tum Ko Chahe (Version-2)" | Altaaf Sayyed | Altaaf Sayyed | Palak Muchhal | |
| MMIRSA | "Naio Jeena Tere Bina" | Meet Bros Anjjan | Kumaar | Palak Muchhal | |
| Love Day - Pyaar Ka Din | "Fiza Ye Khiza" | Sagar Sarkar | Ravi Babu | | |
| Cute Kameena | "Single Chal Riya Hai" | Krsna Solo | Raj Shekhar | | |
| Jab Tum Kaho | "Kab Aaoge" | Anug Garg | Vijay Akela | | |

=== 2017 ===
| Film | Song | Composer(s) | Writer(s) | Co-singer(s) | Ref. |
|---|---|---|---|---|---|
| Jab Harry Met Sejal | "Phurrr - Promo" | Pritam, Diplo | Irshad Kamil | Tushar Joshi | |
| Jab Harry Met Sejal | "Phurrr - Film Version" | Pritam, Diplo | Irshad Kamil | Tushar Joshi | |
| Jab Harry Met Sejal | "Ghar" | Pritam | Irshad Kamil | Nikhita Gandhi | |
| Jab Harry Met Sejal | "Ghar - Remix" | Pritam | Irshad Kamil | Nikhita Gandhi | |
| Babumoshai Bandookbaaz | "Khali Khali" | Debojyoti Mishra | Ghalib Asad Bhopali | | |
| Simran | "Baras Ja" | Sachin–Jigar | Priya Saraiya | | |
| Lucknow Central | "Teen Kabootar" | Arjuna Harjai | Kumaar | Divya Kumar, Raftaar | |
| Muzaffarnagar - The Burning Love | "Dekhte Hi Fida" | Faraaz Ahmed | Manoj Kumar Mandi | | |

=== 2018 ===
| Film | Song | Composer(s) | Writer(s) | Co-singer(s) | Ref. |
|---|---|---|---|---|---|
| Padman | "Saale Sapnay" | Amit Trivedi | Kausar Munir | | |
| Phir Se... | "Rozana" | Jeet Gannguli | Rashmi Virag | Tulsi Kumar | |
| Phir Se... | "Ye Dil Jo Hai" | Jeet Gannguli | Rashmi Virag | Shreya Ghosal, Monali Thakur | |
| 3 Storeys | "Zaroori Bewakoofi" | Clinton Cerejo | Pushaan Mukherjee | | |
| Dil Juunglee | "Dil Jaane Na" | Abhishek Arora | Abhiruchi Chand | Neeti Mohan | |
| Angrezi Mein Kehte Hain | "Tera Hua Main Jab se" | Oni-Adil | Prathibha Tiku Sharma | Amrita Talukdar, Deeksha Toor, Parul Mishra, Dilan & Adil Rasheed | |
| Laila Majnu | "Haafiz Haafiz" | Niladri Kumar | Irshad Kamil | | |
| Rajma Chawal | "Ha Ha He" | Hitesh Sonik | Irshad Kamil | | |

=== 2019 ===
| Film | Song | Composer(s) | Writer(s) | Co-singer(s) | Ref. |
|---|---|---|---|---|---|
| Hum Chaar | "Manmeet Mere" | Raaj Aashoo | Shabbir Ahmed | | |
| 72 Hours: Martyr Who Never Died | "Tum Bepanah" | Sunjoy Bose | Sujata Devrari, Vikas Chauhan | Priyanka Negi | |
| Paharganj | "Kyun Dil Mera" | Ajay Singha | Mohit Pathak | | |
| Notebook | "Safar" | Vishal Mishra | Kaushal Kishore | | |
| Romeo Akbar Walter | "Jee Len De" | Raaj Aashoo | Murali Agarwal, Shabbir Ahmed | | |
| Yaaram | Kash fir se | Jeet Gannguli | Kumaar | | |
| Bypass Road | Tanha Mera Pyaar | Rohan-Rohan | Rohan Gokhale | | |
| LuvUTurn | Gam Diya | Puneet Dixit | Kafil Akhter Kafakh, Shivangi Shukla Saxena, Shahid Mansoori | Prabhjot Singh Grover, Seemant Bhatt, Shahzad Ali, Vineet Dhingra, Neel Abdul Backing, Shashi Suman | |
| LuvUTurn | Baahon Mein Apni Tu | Debjyoti Khawas | Kafil Akhter Khafak | Aditi Paul | |

=== 2020 ===
| Film | Song | Composer(s) | Writer(s) | Co-singer(s) | Ref. |
|---|---|---|---|---|---|
| Dil Bechara | "Taare Ginn" | A.R. Rahman | Amitabh Bhattacharya | Shreya Ghoshal | |
| Love Aaj Kal | "Yeh Dooriyan" | Pritam | Irshad Kamil | | |
| Love Aaj Kal | "Yeh Dooriyan" - Remix | Pritam | Irshad Kamil | | |
| Guns of Banaras | "Dheere Dheere Se" | Sohail Sen | Sameer | Pawni Pandey | |

=== 2021 ===
| Film | Song | Composer(s) | Writer(s) | Co-singer(s) | Ref. |
|---|---|---|---|---|---|
| My Goal Football | "Bulla Ki Jaana" | | | | |
| Googly Gumm Hai | " Ojhal " | Sukumar Dutta | Shilpa Surroch | | |
| Googly Gumm Hai | "Aazadiyaan" | Sukumar Dutta | Shilpa Surroch | Raman Raghuvanshi | |
| Bhavai | "Ishq Fitoori" | Shabbir Ahmed | Shabbir Ahmed | Solo | |
| Velle | "Khayali Ishq" | Sohail Sen | Siddharth-Garima | Solo | |

=== 2022 ===
| Film | Song | Composer(s) | Writer(s) | Co-singer(s) | Ref. |
|---|---|---|---|---|---|
| Barun Rai And The House On The Cliff | 1978 | Sohail Sen | Rahul Kumar Shukla | | |
| Gehraiyaan | Gehraiyaan (Reprise) | OAFF, Savera Mehta | Ankur Tewari | Lothika Jha | |
| Salaam Venky | Dhan Te Nan Zindagi | Mithoon | Mithoon | | |
| Judaa Hoke Bhi | Roothaa Hoon | Puneet Dixit | Shweta Bothra | | |
| Thai Massage | Ye Kya Huaa | Joi Barua | Irshad Kamil | | |
| Uunchai | Ladki Pahadi (Mohit Chauhan Version) | Amit Trivedi | Irshad Kamil | | |
| Laal Singh Chaddha | Kahani (Mohit Version) | Pritam | Amitabh Bhattacharya | | |

=== 2023 ===
| Film | Song | Composer(s) | Writer(s) | Co-singer(s) | Ref. |
|---|---|---|---|---|---|
| Tiku Weds Sheru | "Tum Se Milke" | Gaurav Chatterji, Sai Kabir | Sai Kabir | | |

=== 2024 ===
| Film | Songs | Composer | Writer(s) | Co-singer(s) | Ref. |
|---|---|---|---|---|---|
| AGR | "Jo Bhi Kare Hum" | A. R. Rahman | MC Heam | Suryansh | |
| Amar Singh Chamkila | "Ishq Mitaye" | A. R. Rahman | Irshad Kamil | | |
| Amar Singh Chamkila | "Baaja" | A. R. Rahman | Irshad Kamil | Romy, Suryansh, Indrapreet Singh | |
| Dukaan | "Love Story Natthi" | Shreyas Puranik | Siddharth-Garima | Aishwarya Bhandari, Osman Mir | |
| Sector 36 | "Damroo" | Dhunkey | Dhunkey | Anupam Amod | |

=== 2025 ===
| Film | Songs | Composer | Writer(s) | Co-singer(s) | Ref. |
|---|---|---|---|---|---|
| Aap Jaisa Koi | "Jab Tu Sajan" | Rochak Kohli | Gurpreet Saini | | |
| Sarzameen | "Aaj Ruk Ja" | Vishal Khurana K | Kausar Munir | | |
| Jassi Weds Jassi | "Chamkeela" | Rev Shergill | Rev Shergill & Harshh Vardhan Singh Deo | | |

=== 2026 ===
| Film | Songs | Composer | Writer(s) | Co-singer(s) | Ref. |
|---|---|---|---|---|---|
| Border 2 | "Hindustan Meri Jaan" | Anu Malik, Mithoon | Javed Akhtar, Manoj Muntashir | B Praak | |
| Assi | "Mann Hawa" | Rochak Kohli | Kumaar | Parampara Tandon, Rochak Kohli | |
| Peddi | "Chikri Chikri" | A.R. Rahman | Raqueeb Alam | | |
| Idhayam Murali | "Vaan Vaan" | Thaman S | Vivek | | |
| Main Vaapas Aaunga | Ishq Mastana | A.R. Rahman | Irshad Kamil | Nargis, Pooja Tiwari | |

== Albums ==
=== 1998–2016 ===
| Year | Album/Single | Song | Composer(s) | Writer(s) | Co-singer(s) |
|---|---|---|---|---|---|
| 1998 | Boondein | "Dooba Dooba" | Mohit Chauhan; Kem Trivedi; Atul Mittal; Kenny Puri | Mohit Chauhan; Kem Trivedi; Atul Mittal; Kenny Puri | |
| 1998 | Boondein | "Mermaid" | Mohit Chauhan; Kem Trivedi; Atul Mittal; Kenny Puri | Mohit Chauhan; Kem Trivedi; Atul Mittal; Kenny Puri | |
| 1998 | Boondein | "Thanda Paani" | Mohit Chauhan; Kem Trivedi; Atul Mittal; Kenny Puri | Mohit Chauhan; Kem Trivedi; Atul Mittal; Kenny Puri | |
| 1998 | Boondein | "Ganga Nahale" | Mohit Chauhan; Kem Trivedi; Atul Mittal; Kenny Puri | Mohit Chauhan; Kem Trivedi; Atul Mittal; Kenny Puri | |
| 1998 | Boondein | "Boondein" | Mohit Chauhan; Kem Trivedi; Atul Mittal; Kenny Puri | Mohit Chauhan; Kem Trivedi; Atul Mittal; Kenny Puri Prasoon Joshi | |
| 1998 | Boondein | "Jaadugar" | Mohit Chauhan; Kem Trivedi; Atul Mittal; Kenny Puri | Mohit Chauhan; Kem Trivedi; Atul Mittal; Kenny Puri Prasoon Joshi | |
| 1998 | Boondein | "Koi Pooche" | Mohit Chauhan; Kem Trivedi; Atul Mittal; Kenny Puri | Mohit Chauhan; Kem Trivedi; Atul Mittal; Kenny Puri Prasoon Joshi | |
| 1998 | Boondein | "Saujha" | Mohit Chauhan; Kem Trivedi; Atul Mittal; Kenny Puri | Prasoon Joshi | |
| 1998 | Boondein | "Paheli" | Mohit Chauhan; Kem Trivedi; Atul Mittal; Kenny Puri | Prasoon Joshi | |
| 1998 | Boondein | "Humsafar" | Mohit Chauhan; Kem Trivedi; Atul Mittal; Kenny Puri; Sailesh Sharma | Mohit Chauhan; Kem Trivedi; Atul Mittal; Kenny Puri; Prasoon Joshi; Sailesh Sharma | |
| 2000 | Pehchaan | "Chakkar Ghor" | Mohit Chauhan; Atul Mittal; Kem Trivedi; Kenny Puri | Prasoon Joshi | |
| 2000 | Pehchaan | "Door Chala Aaya" | Mohit Chauhan; Atul Mittal; Kem Trivedi; Kenny Puri | Prasoon Joshi | |
| 2000 | Pehchaan | "Tu wo Nahi" | Mohit Chauhan; Atul Mittal; Kem Trivedi; Kenny Puri | Prasoon Joshi | |
| 2000 | Pehchaan | "Jadu Tona" | Mohit Chauhan; Atul Mittal; Kem Trivedi; Kenny Puri | Prasoon Joshi | |
| 2000 | Pehchaan | "Dastak" | Mohit Chauhan; Atul Mittal; Kem Trivedi; Kenny Puri | Prasoon Joshi | |
| 2000 | Pehchaan | "Lullaby" | Mohit Chauhan; Atul Mittal; Kem Trivedi; Kenny Puri | Mohit Chauhan | |
| 2000 | Pehchaan | "Morni" | Mohit Chauhan; Atul Mittal; Kem Trivedi; Kenny Puri | | |
| 2000 | Pehchaan | "Sapnay" (Ek Pal) | Mohit Chauhan; Atul Mittal; Kem Trivedi; Kenny Puri | Taylor Simposon | |
| 2006 | Kaise Kahoo | "Baat Hai Sahi" | Chris Powell | S. Mukhtiyar | |
| 2008 | Sar Utha Ke Jiyo | "Sar Utha Ke Jiyo" | Shantanu Moitra | Swanand Kirkire | |
| 2009 | Kalam Poetry | "My Dear Soldiers" | Mohit Chauhan, Atul Mittal, Kem Trivedi & Kenny Puri | Dr. A.P.J. Abdul Kalam | |
| 2009 | Kalam Poetry | "Whispers of Jasmin" | Mohit Chauhan, Atul Mittal, Kem Trivedi & Kenny Puri | Dr. A.P.J. Abdul Kalam | |
| 2009 | Kalam Poetry | "Cloud" | Mohit Chauhan, Atul Mittal, Kem Trivedi & Kenny Puri | Dr. A.P.J. Abdul Kalam | |
| 2009 | Kalam Poetry | "The Vision" | Mohit Chauhan, Atul Mittal, Kem Trivedi & Kenny Puri | Dr. A.P.J. Abdul Kalam | |
| 2009 | Kalam Poetry | "Harmony" | Mohit Chauhan, Atul Mittal, Kem Trivedi & Kenny Puri | Dr. A.P.J. Abdul Kalam | |
| 2009 | Kalam Poetry | "Prayer for the Departed Children" | Mohit Chauhan, Atul Mittal, Kem Trivedi & Kenny Puri | Dr. A.P.J. Abdul Kalam | |
| 2009 | Fitoor - The Special Edition | "Tune Jo na Kaha" | Mohit Chauhan | Mohit Chauhan | |
| 2009 | Fitoor - The Special Edition | "Meri Tarah" | | | |
| 2009 | Fitoor - The Special Edition | "Musafir" | | | |
| 2009 | Fitoor - The Special Edition | "Boondein" | | | |
| 2009 | Fitoor - The Special Edition | "Dooba Dooba" | | | |
| 2009 | Fitoor - The Special Edition | "Uff Ye Nazara" | | | |
| 2009 | Fitoor - The Special Edition | "Main Hoo Badal" | | | |
| 2009 | Fitoor - The Special Edition | "Fitoor" (Shanti Cafe Version) | | | |
| 2009 | Fitoor - The Special Edition | "Challeya" (Mc Leodganj Version) | | | |
| 2009 | Fitoor - The Special Edition | "Jeene De" | | | |
| 2009 | Fitoor - The Special Edition | "Fitoor" | | | |
| 2009 | Fitoor - The Special Edition | "Guncha" | | | |
| 2009 | Fitoor - The Special Edition | "Challeya" | | | |
| 2009 | Fitoor - The Special Edition | "Babaji" | | | |
| 2009 | Fitoor - The Special Edition | "Sabse Peechhe Hum khade" | | | |
| 2009 | Fitoor - The Special Edition | "Sajna" | | | |
| 2009 | Fitoor - The Special Edition | "Mai Ni Meriye" | | | |
| 2011 | Aao Sai | "Haar Ke Jag Se" | | | |
| 2011 | Star Parivaar Awards 2011 | "Star Parivaar - Theme Song" | | | Shreya Ghosal |
| 2011 | Ye No.1 Yaari Hai | "Ye No.1 Yaaelri Hai" | | | |
| 2012 | Salami Ho Jaye | "Salami Ho Jaye" | Shamir Tandon | | Shaan (singer), Sonu Nigam, Shankar Mahadevan, Sunidhi Chauhan, Kailash Kher, Zanai Bhosle |
| 2014 | Raunaq (album) | "Khatta Meetha" | A R Rahman | Kapil Sibal | |
| 2014 | Moments of Love | "Ya Tu Pari" | Roop Kumar Rathod | Basant Chaudhary | |
| 2016 | Yeh Hai Aashiqui Season 4 | "Yeh Hai Aashiqui - Title" | Abhishek Arora | Abhuruchi Chand | Neeti Mohan |
| 2016 | Tumhari Aarazoo | "Tumhari Aarazoo" | Sushant - Shankar | Basant Chaudhary | |

=== 2017–present ===
| Year | Album/Single | Song | Composer(s) | Writer(s) | Co-singer(s) | Ref. |
|---|---|---|---|---|---|---|
| 2017 | Made by Mom | "Maa Teri Soch Hai" | Rajeev V Bhalla | Manoj Muntashir | | |
| 2017 | Haseen Shaam Ye | "Haseen Shaam Ye" | | | Kalpana Patowary | |
| 2019 | Isha Foundation | "Yogi Shiva Mahadev" | | | | |
| 2019 | † Nazar | "Nazar" | Jay Chakraborty | Jay Chakraborty | | |
| 2019 | Dil ka Salaam - A Tribute to Armed Force | "Dil Ka Salaam" | Raaj Aashoo | | | |
| 2020 | Meethi Meethi Gallan | Meethi Meethi Gallan | Raaj Aashoo | | | |
| 2020 | Salaam | Salaam - Tribute to Corona Warriors | Mohit Chauhan | | | |
| 2020 | Hum Haar Nahi Maanenge | Hum Haar Nahi Maanenge | AR Rahman | Prasoon Joshi | AR Rahman, Clinton Cerejo, Jonita Gandhi, Shashaa Tirupati, Javed Ali, Neeti Mohan, Mika Singh, Shruti Haasan, Abhay Jodhpurkar, Harshdeep Kaur, Sid Sriram, Khatija Rahman, Sivamani, Mohini Dey, Asad Khan | |
| 2020 | Kisi Gair Ka Nahi: Gaana Originals | Kisi Gair Ka Nahi | | | | |
| 2020 | Dil Ki Shikayat | Dil Ki Shikayat| | Ayaz Ismail | Anvita Dutt | | |
| 2020 | Jeet Jayenge Hum | Jeet Jayenge Hum | Sajid–Wajid | | | |
| 2021 | Yuvaah | Yuvaah Hai Hum | | | | |
| 2021 | Swacch Bharat | Swacch Bharat | | | | |
| 2021 | Rang Lageyaa | Rang Lageyaa | Rochak Kohli | Kumaar | | |
| 2021 | Ae Watan | Ae Watan | Abhishek Bakhshi | Deepak Sharma | | |
| 2022 | Teri Ada | Teri Ada | Kaushik-Guddu | Kaushik-Guddu | Saumya Upadhyay | |
| 2023 | Himesh Ke Dil Se | Benoor Saaye | Himesh Reshammiya | Himesh Reshammiya | | |

== Devotional songs ==
| Year | Song | Composer | Lyricist | Co-singer |
|---|---|---|---|---|
| 2017 | Ud Jayega - Isha Foundation | Mohit Chauhan, Sounds of Isha | Mohit Chauhan | Sounds of Isha |
| 2018 | Haar Ke Jag Se - Aao Sai | Mohit Chauhan | Mohit Chauhan | |
| 2019 | Yogi Shiva Mahadev - Isha Foundation | Mohit Chauhan | Folk, Mohit Chauhan | Aishwarya Nigam |
| 2020 | Shiv Kailasho Ke Waasi | Himachali Folk | Himachali Folk | Olena Yeremenko |
| 2025 | More Ram Se Sundar Koi Nahi | Raaj Aashoo | Seepi Jha | Simpal Kharel |
| 2025 | Choto So Mero Madan Gopal - Achyutam Keshvam | Raaj Aashoo | Folk | Neeti Mohan |
| 2026 | Kailasho Ke Shambhu | Raaj Aashoo | Seepi Jha | Raaj Aashoo |
| 2026 | Shiv Kailasho Ke Waasi (Remake) | Raaj Aashoo (Himachali Folk) | Seepi Jha (Folk) | Jaya Kishori |
| 2026 | Ram Stuti | Traditional (Addn. by Raaj Aashoo & Mohit Chauhan) | Traditional | |

== TV performances ==
| Year | Album/Single | Song | Composer(s) | Writer(s) | Co-singer(s) |
|---|---|---|---|---|---|
| 2011 | MTV Unplugged (India) Season 1 (Episode - 2) | "Tum Se Hi" | Pritam | Irshad Kamil | |
| 2011 | MTV Unplugged (India) Season 1 (Episode - 2) | "Dooba Dooba" | Mohit Chauhan | Mohit Chauhan | |
| 2011 | MTV Unplugged (India) Season 1 (Episode - 2) | "Ganga Nahale" | Mohit Chauhan | Mohit Chauhan | |
| 2011 | MTV Unplugged (India) Season 1 (Episode - 2) | "Masakali" | AR Rahman | Prasoon Joshi | |
| 2011 | MTV Unplugged (India) Season 1 (Episode - 2) | "Guncha Koi" | Mohit Chauhan | Mohit Chauhan | |
| 2011 | MTV Unplugged (India) Season 1 (Episode - 2) | "Mai Ni Meriye" | Mohit Chauhan | Mohit Chauhan | |
| 2011 | MTV Unplugged (India) Season 1 (Episode - 2) | "Babaji" | Mohit Chauhan | Mohit Chauhan | |
| 2011 | The Dewarists | "Maaya" | Indian Ocean (band) | Swanand Kirkire | Rahul Ram, Himanshu Joshi |
| 2014 | Aaj Ki Raat Hai Zindagi | "Neela Aasma So Gaya" | | | |

== TV serials title and themes ==
| Year | Album/Single | Song | Composer(s) | Writer(s) | Co-singer(s) | Ref. |
|---|---|---|---|---|---|---|
| 2011 | Star Parivaar Awards 2011 | "Star Parivaar - Theme Song" | | | Shreya Ghosal | |
| 2016 | Yeh Hai Aashiqui Season 4 | "Yeh Hai Aashiqui - Title" | Abhishek Arora | Abhuruchi Chand | Neeti Mohan | |

== Bengali songs ==
| Year | Film | Song | Composer(s) | Writer(s) | Co-singer(s) | Ref. |
|---|---|---|---|---|---|---|
| 2010 | Shedin Dekha Hoyechilo | "Mon Hariye Beghorey" | Jeet Gannguli | Prasenjit Mukherjee | None | |
| 2011 | Paglu | "Esechi Toke Niye" | Jeet Gannguli | Raja Chanda | None | |
| 2012 | Le Halwa Le | "Chupi Chupi" | Jeet Gannguli | Raja Chanda | Shreya Ghoshal | |

== Telugu songs ==
| Year | Film | Song | Composer(s) | Writer(s) | Co-singer(s) | Note(s) | Ref. |
|---|---|---|---|---|---|---|---|
| 2012 | 3 | "Po Ve Po" | Anirudh Ravichander | Dhanush | Anirudh Ravichander | Dubbed | |
| 2013 | Dhoom 3 | "Oohinchale Oohinchale" | Pritam | Bhaskarabatla | | Dubbed | |
| 2015 | Yevade Subramanyam | "Idhera"(Version l) | Radhan | Ramajogayya Sastry | | | |
| 2015 | Yevade Subramanyam | "Idhera"(Version ll) | Radhan | Ramajogayya Sastry | | | |
| 2015 | Akhil | "Zara Zara Navvaradhe" | Anoop Rubens | Krishna Chaitanya | | | |
| 2018 | Sarkar | "Top Tucker" | A. R. Rahman | Chandrabose | | Dubbed | |
| 2019 | First Rank Raju | "Aa Ghagananiki" | Kiran Ravindranath | Vanamali | | | |
| 2026 | Peddi | "Chikiri Chikiri" | A. R. Rahman | Balaji | | | |
| 2026 | Itlu Arjuna | "Chinni Chinni" | Thaman S | | | | |

== Tamil songs ==
| Year | Film | Song | Composer(s) | Writer(s) | Co-singer(s) | Ref. |
|---|---|---|---|---|---|---|
| 2012 | 3 | "Po Nee Po" | Anirudh Ravichander | Dhanush | Anirudh Ravichander | |
| 2013 | Ameerin Aadhi-Bhagavan | "Agadam Bagadam" | Yuvan Shankar Raja | Manoj | | |
| 2013 | Dhoom 3 | "Ore Oru Parvai" | Pritam | Pa. Vijay | | |
| 2013 | Ethir Neechal | "Velicha Poove" | Anirudh Ravichander | Vaali | Shreya Ghoshal | |
| 2013 | Kerala Nattilam Pengaludane | "Hello Yaaradhu" | S. S. Kumaran | Vairamuthu | | |
| 2014 | Aambala | "Vaa Vaa Vaa Vannila" | Hiphop Tamizha | Hiphop Tamizha | Amrita Shekar, Nirthya Maria Andrews | |
| 2015 | Saahasam | "Angry Bird Penne" | Thaman S | Na. Muthukumar | | |
| 2018 | Sarkar | "Top Tucker" | A. R. Rahman | Vivek | | |
| 2024 | Ayalaan | "Suro Suro" | A. R. Rahman | Madhan Karky | Nakul Abhyankar | |
| 2025 | Dude | "Nallaru Po" | Sai Abhyankkar | Vivek | Sai Abhyankkar and Tippu | |
| 2026 | Idhayam Murali | "Vaan Vaan" | Thaman S | Vivek | | |

== Punjabi songs ==
| Year | Film | Song | Composer(s) | Writer(s) | Co-singer(s) | Ref. |
|---|---|---|---|---|---|---|
| 2010 | Hai Mar Jaawaan | "Rab Di Sau Jind Tere Naal Soniye" | Saurabh-Vaibhav | Arjun Poddar | | |
| 2012 | Pinky Moge Wali | "Darmiyaan" | Jatinder Shah | Kumaar | | |
| 2014 | Aa Gaye Munde U.K. De | "Tere Faasle" | Jatinder Shah | Kumaar | Sunidhi Chauhan | |
| 2019 | kitty party | Rang | 'Ullumanati' | 'Ulluminati' | Harshdeep kaur | |

== Marathi songs ==
| Year | Film | Song | Composer(s) | Writer(s) | Co-singer(s) | Ref. |
|---|---|---|---|---|---|---|
| 2011 | Paach Naar Ek Bejaar | "Zurate Man He Din Raat" | Chinar–Mahesh | Guru Thakur, Samruddhi Pawar | Solo | |
| 2014 | Ishq Wala Love | "Hello Kashi Aahes Tu" | Avinash–Vishwajeet | Shrirang Godbole | Solo | |
| 2023 | Ghar Banduk Biryani | "Ghar Banduk Biryani"(title track) | AV Prafullachandra | Vaibhav Deshmukh | Solo | |

== Kannada songs ==
| Year | Film | Song | Composer(s) | Writer(s) | Co-singer(s) | Ref. |
|---|---|---|---|---|---|---|
| 2009 | Birugaali | "Madhura Pisumaatige" | Arjun Janya | Jayanth Kaikini | Shamitha Malnad | |
| 2021 | Premam Poojyam | ''Hariya Preeth'' | Dr Raghavendra B S | Dr Raghavendra B S | Mohit Chauhan | |

== Gujarati songs ==
| Year | Film | Song | Composer(s) | Writer(s) | Co-singer(s) | Ref. |
|---|---|---|---|---|---|---|
| 2017 | Last Chance | "Jaag Re Banda" | Maulik Mehta | | | |
| 2019 | Bau Na Vichar | "Ye Shaam Nahi Lautegi" | Hrutul & Badal Soni | Hrutul | | |

== Himachali songs ==
| Year | Film | Song | Composer(s) | Writer(s) | Co-singer(s) | Ref. |
|---|---|---|---|---|---|---|
| 2017 | Saanjh | "Deva Mere" | Gaurav Guleria | Adarsh Dhiman | | |
| 2017 | Saanjh | "Puchhe Amma" | Gaurav Guleria | Ajay Saklani | Pavithra Chari | |

== Jingles ==
| Advertisements | Song | Notes | Ref. |
|---|---|---|---|
| Coca-Cola | O Brother O Bhaai | | |
| Samsung | Beh Chala | | |
| Wheel (detergent) | Mehekte Bikharte Saanso | Feat. Salman Khan and Prachi Desai | |
| Alpenlible | Lalach Aaha Lap Lap | Featuring Kajol | |
| TVS | Jyada Jyada | Feat. Amitabh Bachchan | |
| AJNARA - Peace of Mind | Chhoti Si Chhat | | |
| Vicks VapoRub | | | |
| Hippo Munachies | | | |
| Alchemist | | | |
| Nescafe | Ye Lamhe Nescafe ke | | |
| Maruti Suzuki - Alto (2011) | I dream that love goes on | | |
| Parachute | | | |
| Venus Soap | Jab Twacha Gungunaye | | |
| L'Oreal Paris India | Jad Se Judein | | |
| Maruti Suzuki Alto K10 | Naya Khwaab Hai Yaadon mein Uljha Huaa | | |
| HDFC Bank | Sar Utha Ke | | |

== Digital concert ==
| Season 1 | Song | Ref. |
|---|---|---|
| CoHear #1 | " Instrumental guitar and harmonica" | |
| CoHear #1 | "Ud Jayega Hans Akela " | |
| CoHear #1 | "Guncha koi" | |
