= List of awards and nominations received by Mohit Chauhan =

Mohit Chauhan is an Indian playback singer, best known for his work in Hindi films. He also sings in other languages, including Pahari, English, Bengali, Gujarati, Kannada, Marathi, Tamil, Punjabi and Telugu.

== Annual Central European Bollywood Awards ==
The Annual Central European Bollywood Awards are fan awards with the voters mostly from Germany, Austria and Switzerland. They are users of the Bollywood Forum belonging to the film website, organizer of the ACEBAs. Chauhan has received one awards from five nominations.

Year	Category	Song	Result	Ref.
2006	Central European Bollywood Awards - Best Male Playback Singer	Khoon Chala	Nominated	
2007	Central European Bollywood Awards - Best Male Playback Singer	Tum Se Hi	Nominated	
2009	Central European Bollywood Awards - Best Male Playback Singer	Masakali	Nominated	
2010	Central European Bollywood Awards - Best Male Playback Singer	Pee Loo	Won	
2011	Central European Bollywood Awards - Best Male Playback Singer	Phir Se Udd Chala	Nominated	

== BIG Star Entertainment Awards ==
The BIG Star Entertainment Awards are presented annually by Reliance Broadcast Network Limited in association with Star India to honour personalities from the field of entertainment across movies, music, television, sports, theater and dance. Chauhan has received an award from three nominations.

Year	Category	Song	Result	Ref.
2010	Best Male Singer	Pee Loo from Once Upon A Time in Mumbai	Nominated	
2011	Best Male Singer	Sadda Haq from Rockstar	Won	
2012	Best Male Singer	Ala Barfi from Barfi!	Nominated	

== Bollywood Hungama Surfers Choice Music Awards ==
Bollywood Hungama Surfers Choice Music Awards were presented by Bollywood Hungama to honour the musical work of the artists throughout the year. The winners have been selected based on the number of votes acquired by each of the contenders. These awards have been discontinued after 2015.

Year	Film	Nominated song	Result	Ref.
2011	Rockstar	"Sadda Haq"		
2011	Rockstar	"Tum Ho"		
2011	Rockstar	"Jo Bhi Main"		
2009	Delhi 6	"Masakali"		
2009	Love Aaj Kal	"Ye Dooriyaa"		

== daf BAMA Awards ==
daf BAMA award are Multicultural Musical Award at International Level where Best Male Act are selected as per online voting by the people corresponding to their country.

Year	Category	Song	Result	Ref.
2016	""Best Male Act"" India		Won	
2016	""Best Male Act"" ""International""		Won	

== Filmfare Awards ==
The Filmfare Awards are one of the oldest and most prestigious Hindi film awards. They are presented annually by The Times Group for excellence of cinematic achievements. Chauhan received two awards from five nominations.

Year	Category	Song	Result
2010	Best Male Playback Singer	Masakali from Delhi-6	Won
2011	Best Male Playback Singer	Pee Loon from Once Upon a Time in Mumbai	Nominated
2012	Best Male Playback Singer	Sadda Haq from Rockstar	Nominated
2012	Best Male Playback Singer	Jo Bhi Main from Rockstar	Won
2013	Best Male Playback Singer	Ala Barfi from Barfi!	Nominated

== Global Indian Music Academy Awards ==
The GiMA Best Male Playback Singer Award is given by Global Indian Music Academy as a part of its annual Global Indian Music Academy Awards for Hindi films, to recognise a male playback singer who has delivered an outstanding performance in a film song. Chauhan received two awards from six nominations.

Year	Category	Song	Result
2011	Best Male Playback Singer	Pee Loo from Once Upon A Time in Mumbai	Won
2011	Best Male Playback Singer	Tujhe Bhula Diya from Anjaana Anjaani	Nominated
2012	Best Male Playback Singer	Naadan Parinde from Rockstar	Won
2012	Best Male Playback Singer	Kun Faya Kun from Rockstar	Nominated
2012	Best Male Playback Singer	Sadda Haq from Rockstar	Nominated
2016	Best Male Playback Singer	Matargasti from Tamasha	Nominated

== IIFA Award ==
The IIFA Best Male Playback Award is chosen by the viewers and the winner is announced at the ceremony.

Year	Category	Song	Result
2010	Best Male Singer	Masakali from Delhi-6	Nominated
2011	Best Male Singer	Pee Loon from Once Upon a Time in Mumbai	Nominated
2012	Best Male Singer	Naadan Parindey from Rockstar	Won

== Mirchi Music Awards ==
The Mirchi Music Awards are presented annually by Radio Mirchi to honour both artistic and technical excellence of professionals in the Hindi language film music industry of India.

Year	Category	Song	Result
2009	Best Male Singer	Masakali from Delhi-6	Won
2010	Male Vocalist of The Year	"Pee Loo" from Once Upon A Time in Mumbai	Nominated
2011	Best Song Representing Sufi Tradition	"Kun Faya Kun" from Rockstar	Won
2011	Male Vocalist of The Year	"Nadaan Parinde" from Rockstar	Nominated
2011	Male Vocalist of The Year	"Sadda Haq" from Rockstar	Nominated

== RMIM Puraskaar ==
The RMIM Puraskaar borrows its name from the news group rec.music.indian.misc, the oldest community of Hindi Film Music lovers on the net. These awards voice the opinion of HFM listeners scattered all over the Internet including on forums, groups, blogs, and social networks. Shreya Ghoshal has won twelve awards from twenty-four nominations in different categories till date.

Year	Category	Film	Nominated song	Result	Ref.
2009	Best Sung Solo Song	Delhi 6	"Masakali"	Won	
2011	Male Singer of the Year	Overall Performance During the Year		Won	
2011	Best Sung Solo Song	Rockstar	"Sadda Haq"	Won	
2011	Song of The Year	Rockstar	"Kun Faya Kun"	Won	
2011	Satish Kalra Sammaan	Rockstar	(along with the musical team of Barfi!)	Won	
2011	Best Sung Song (Group)	Rockstar	"Kun Faya Kun"	Won	
2017	RMIM Samman	Jab Harry Met Sejal	(along with the musical team of Jab Harry Met Sejal)	Won	
2017	Best Sung Song Duet	Jab Harry Met Sejal	Ghar	Nominated	

== Screen Award ==
The Screen Award for Best Male Playback is chosen by a distinguished panel of judges from the Indian Bollywood film industry and the winners are announced in January.

Year	Category	Song	Result
Star Screen Awards
2010	Best Male Singer	Masakali from Delhi-6	Nominated
2011	Best Male Singer	Pee Loon from Once Upon a Time in Mumbai	Nominated
2012	Best Male Singer	Phir Se Udd Chala & Sadda Haq from 'Rockstar'	Won
Colors Screen Awards
2013	Best Male Singer	Ala Barfi from Barfi	Nominated

== South Indian International Movie Awards ==
South Indian International Movie Awards, also known as the SIIMA Awards, rewards the artistic and technical achievements of the South Indian film industry.

Year	Category	Song	Result
2013	Best Male Playback Singer	Po Nee Po from 3	Nominated

== Star Guild Awards ==
The Producers Guild Film Award for Best Male Playback Singer (previously known as the Apsara Award for Best Male Playback Singer) is given by the producers of the film and television guild as part of its annual award ceremony to recognise the best Indian film of the year.

Year	Category	Song	Result
2010	Best Male Singer	Yeh Dooriyan from 'Love Aaj Kal'	Won
2011	Best Male Singer	Pee Loon from Once Upon A Time in Mumbai	Nominated
2012	Best Male Singer	"Sadda Haq" from Rockstar	Won
2012	Best Male Singer	"Naadan Parinde" from Rockstar	Nominated
2013	Best Male Singer	"Ala Barfi" from Barfi	Nominated
2016	Best Male Singer	"Matargashti" from Tamasha	Nominated

als in the Hindi language film industry of India. The awards were first introduced in 2013.

== Vijay Awards ==
The Vijay for Best Male Playback Singer is given by STAR Vijay as part of its annual Vijay Awards ceremony for Tamil (Kollywood) films. The award was first given in 2007. Mohit Chauhan is the first and only Bollywood singer to win this award.

Year	Category	Song	Result	Ref
2012	Best Playback Singer Male	Po Nee Po from 3	Won	

== Zee Cine Awards ==
The Zee Cine Award Best Playback Singer- Male is chosen by the jury of Zee Entertainment Enterprises as part of its annual award ceremony for Hindi films, to recognise a male playback singer. Following its inception in 1998, a ceremony wasn't held in 2009 and 2010, but resumed back in 2011. Chauhan received three awards from five nominations.

Year	Category	Song	Result	Ref
2011	Best Male Singer	Pee Loon from Once Upon a Time in Mumbai	Won	
2012	Best Male Singer	Sadda Haq from Rockstar	Nominated	
2012	Best Male Singer	Jo Bhi Main from Rockstar	Won	
2013	Best Male Singer	Ala Barfi from Barfi	Nominated	
2016	Best Male Singer	Matargashti from Tamasha	Won	

== Other awards and honors ==
Year	Awards	Song	Result	Ref.
2011	RMIM Puraskaar - Male Singer of the Year	Pee Loo	Won	
2012	People's Choice Awards India Best Male Playback Singer	Sadda Haq from Rockstar	Nominated	
2015	Musical Sameeksha Awards - Best Male Playback Singer	Matargasti from Tamasha	Won	
2017	Rajdhani Rattan Awards - Ekta Mission Delhi		Won	

== Special Achievements ==
•Brands Academy Indian Of the Year - 2017 •Green Ambassador of Sikkim - 10 May 2018
