= Rekha Bhardwaj =

Indian singer

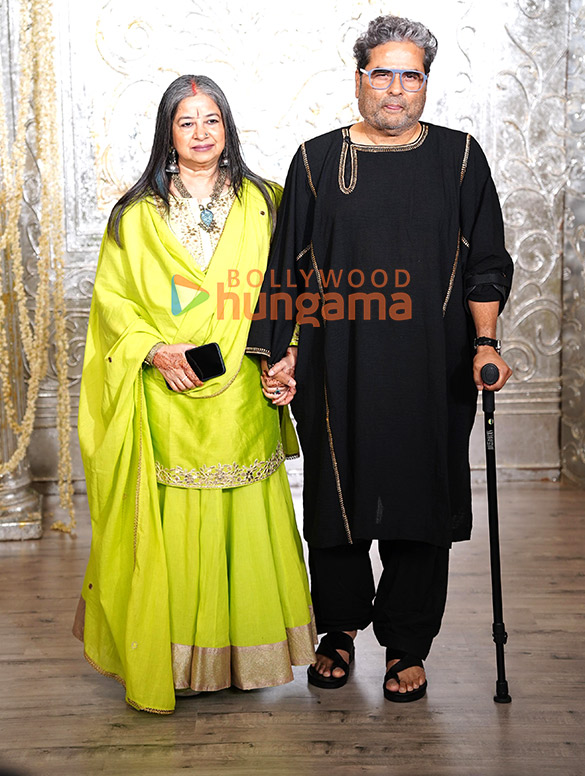
- Rekha Bhardwaj (left) with her husband, Vishal Bhardwaj in 2025

Background information
- Born: 24 January 1964 (age 62); Delhi, India
- Genres: Playback singing in Bollywood and regional films
- Occupation: Singer
- Years active: 1997–present

Rekha Bhardwaj is an Indian singer and live performer. She has received two Filmfare and one National Awards. In addition to Hindi, she has also sung in Bengali, Bhojpuri, Marathi, Punjabi and Malayalam languages.

== Personal life ==
Bhardwaj was born in Delhi and is one of six siblings (5 sisters and a brother). She married film director, composer and playback singer Vishal Bhardwaj in 1991. She first met him in 1984 when preparing for the annual function of Hindu College in New Delhi.

== Professional career ==
Bhardwaj was initially trained in music by her older sister at their home. She went on to receive formal training under Pandit Amarnath.

Bhardwaj's first album, Ishqa Ishqa, was released in 2002, ten years after its conception. Its success brought her recognition and helped win her the opportunity to record career-defining songs like "Namak Ishq Ka" in the 2006 film Omkara (composed by her husband Vishal Bharadwaj) followed by "Sasural Genda Phool" (a Chhattisgarhi folk song recreated by A. R. Rahman) in the 2009 film Delhi-6.

== Awards and honours ==
- 2015 Nominated for Filmfare Award for Best Playback Singer (female) for the song "Humari atariya pe" from the 2014 film Dedh Ishqiya
- 2014 Nominated for Hum Award for Best Original Soundtrack for the song Kabhi Ashna Kabhi Ajnabi from the 2013 Pakistani TV serial Humnasheen
- 2013 Mirchi Music Awards for Raag-based song of the year for "Ek Ghadi" from D-Day
- 2012 Co-winner of Filmfare Award for Best Playback Singer (female) with Usha Uthup for the song "Darling" from the 2011 film 7 Khoon Maaf
- 2011 National Award for the song "Badi dheere jali" from the 2010 film Ishqiya
- 2011 Mirchi Music Awards for Female Vocalist of The Year for "Darling" from 7 Khoon Maaf
- 2010 Filmfare Award for Best Playback Singer (female) for the song "Sasural Genda Phool" from the 2009 film Delhi-6
- 2009 Mirchi Music Awards for Female Vocalist of The Year for the song "Sasural Genda Phool" from Delhi-6

== Discography ==
Bhardwaj has been a playback singer for various films in various languages.

=== Hindi ===
Release year	Film	Track title	Comments
2023	Ishq Vishk Rebound	Rehmat (Rebound)	with Rochak Kohli
2023	Kill	Nikat	with Haroon-Gavin
2023	Khufiya	Mat Aana	with Vishal Bhardwaj (released on Netflix)
2023	Gadar 2	"Bata De Sakhi"	with Monty Sharma
2023	Kuttey	Kuttey (Title Track)	with Vishal Bhardwaj
2022	Mismatched (Netflix Web Series)	Aise Kyun (Ghazal Version)	with Anurag Saikiya
2021	Dhindora (YouTube Web Series)	Saazish	with Bhuvan Bam
2021	Hum Do Hamare Do	Vedha Sajjeyaa	with Sachin–Jigar and Vishal Jain (released on Disney Plus Hotstar)
2020	Angrezi Medium	Laadki	with Sachin-Jigar
2018	Pari	So Ja So Ja	
2018	Pataakha	Balma	with Sunidhi Chauhan and Vishal Bhardwaj
2018	Pataakha	Hello Hello	with Vishal Bhardwaj
2018	Love per Square Foot	Raaz Apne Dil Ke (Indian),	released on Netflix
2018	Love per Square Foot	Raaz Apne Dil Ke (Western)	released on Netflix
2018	Vodka Diaries	Sakhi Ri	with Ustad Rashid Khan
2017	Rangoon	Mere Miyan Gaye England	with Vishal Bhardwaj
2017	Rangoon	Chori Chori	with Vishal Bhardwaj
2017	Rangoon	Yeh Ishq Hai (Female Version)	with Vishal Bhardwaj
2016	Dobara Phir Se	Rasta Tham Gaya	
2016	Tum Bin 2	Teri Fariyad	with Jagjit Singh and Ankit Tiwari
2016	Tum Bin 2	Teri Fariyad Extended Version	with Jagjit Singh and Ankit Tiwari
2016	Jugni	Bolladiyaan	with Clinton Cerejo
2015	Drishyam	Dum Ghutta Hai	with Rahat Fateh Ali Khan and Vishal Bhardwaj
2015	Talvar	Zinda	with Vishal Bhardwaj
2015	Badlapur	Judaai	with Arijit Singh and Sachin-Jigar
2015	Bajrangi Bhaijaan	Zindagi Kuch Toh Bata	with Rahat Fateh Ali Khan and Pritam
2015	Bin Roye	Chan Chariya	
2014	Happy Ending	Mileya Mileya	with Jigar Saraiya and Priya Andrews
2014	The Xpose	Sheeshe Ka Samundar (reprise)	with Himesh Reshammiya
2014	Haider	Aaj Ke Naam	with Vishal Bhardwaj
2014	Revolver Rani	Banna Banni	
2014	Dedh Ishqiya	Hamari Atariya Pe	with Vishal Bhardwaj
2014	Dedh Ishqiya	Jagaave Saari Raina	with Pandit Birju Maharaj and Vishal Bhardwaj
2013	Ek Thi Daayan	Lautungi Main	
2013	Maazii	Mora Jiya Lagge Na	Nominated for Radio Mirchi Awards for Best Rag Based Song
2013	D-Day	Ek Ghadi	with Shankar-Ehsaan-Loy
2013	Yeh Jawaani Hai Deewani	Kabira	with Tochi Raina and Pritam
2013	Yeh Jawaani Hai Deewani	"Ghagra"	with Vishal Dadlani and Pritam
2013	Matru Ki Bijlee Ka Mandola	Oye Boy Charlie	with Mohit Chauhan, Shankar Mahadevan and Vishal Bhardwaj
2013	Matru Ki Bijlee Ka Mandola	"Badal Uthiya"	with Vishal Bhardwaj
2012	Barfi!	Phir Le Aya Dil	with Pritam
2011	7 Khoon Maaf	Darling	with Usha Uthup and Vishal Bhardwaj
2011	7 Khoon Maaf	Doosri Darling	with Usha Uthup, Clinton Cerejo, Francis Castellino and Vishal Bhardwaj
2010	Veer	Kanha	with Sajid-Wajid
2010	Sadiyaan	Waqt Ne Jo Beej Boyaa	
2010	Raavan	Ranjha Ranjha	with Javed Ali, Anuradha Sriram and A. R. Rahman
2010	Ishqiya	Ab Mujhe Koi	with Vishal Bhardwaj
2010	Ishqiya	Badi Dheere Jali	with Vishal Bhardwaj
2009	Radio	Piya Jaise Ladoo Motichoor Wale	with Himesh Reshammiya
2009	Kaminey	"Raat Ke Dhai Baje"	with Sunidhi Chauhan, Kunal Ganjawala, Suresh Wadkar, Earl E D and Vishal Bhardwaj
2009	Kaminey	"Raat Ke Dhai Baje" (remix)	with Sunidhi Chauhan, Kunal Ganjawala, Suresh Wadkar, Earl E D and Vishal Bhardwaj
2009	Gulaal	Ranaji	
2009	Gulaal	Beedo	
2009	Delhi-6	Genda Phool	with A. R. Rahman
2009	Delhi-6	Aarti (Tumhare Bhavan Mein)	with Kishori Ashok Gowariker, Sujata Majumdar, Shraddha Pandit and A. R. Rahman
2008	Haal-E-Dil	Haal-E-Dil-2	
2008	Superstar	Aankhon Se Khawab Rooth Kar	with Ustad Sultan Khan
2007	Red Swastik	Sadiyon ki Pyaas	
2006	Omkara	Namak Ishq Ka	with Vishal Bhardwaj
2006	Omkara	"Laakad"	with Vishal Bhardwaj
2003	Maqbool	Rone Do	with Vishal Bhardwaj
2003	Maqbool	Chingari	with Vishal Bhardwaj
2002	Makdee	Chutta Hai	with Vishal Bhardwaj
1999	Jahan Tum Le Chalo	Ye Kaisi Chaap	
1999	Godmother	Daaru Rum	
1997	Chachi 420	Ek Woh Din Bhi	

=== Other languages ===
Release year	Film	Track title	Language	Comments
2025	Binodiini: Ekti Natir Upakhyan	Bhaishya Zaibo	Bengali	
2012	Kuni Mulgi Deta Ka Mulgi	Unn Matlabi	Marathi	Her first song in the language
2012	Doshomi	Swapno Bheja Alo	Bengali	
2018	Carbon	Doore Doore	Malayalam	

=== Other works ===
In addition to films, Bhardwaj has also sung for TV serials, etc.

Release year	Work	Track title	Comments
2013	Humnasheen	Kabhi Ashna Kabhi Ajnabi	Title track for Pakistani TV serial
2002	Ishqa Ishqa		Her first music album consisting of Ghazals.

== See also ==
- List of Indian playback singers
