= Dadaria =

Type of folk song

Dadaria (Chhattisgarhi: ददरिया) is one of various types of folk-songs or field-songs of the state of Chhattisgarh in India. These songs were very popular and part of folklore before the 1970s and were sung by village men or women while harvesting in paddy fields or during leisure. In the late 1980s, the singing of these songs by any man before a woman or women in private were considered to be socially unacceptable due to intimate language of these songs which had developed mostly as 'question and response' between a male-female duet. The dadaria songs are now available on recorded tapes and compact discs on audio and video. The famous professional dadaria singers include Sheikh Hussain and Mamta Chandrakar.

A famous song Sasural Genda Phool from the movie Delhi-6 has been adapted from a dadaria.

== Notable Dadaria Songs ==
Some of the famous dadaria songs are

1. Chana Ke Daar Raja Chana Ke Daar Rani
2. Pata De Ja Re, Pata Le Ja Re Gadiwala
3. Ek Paisa Ke Bhaji La Du Paisa Ma Dehe O
4. Ka Tai Mola Mohni Daar Dehe Gonda Phool
5. Kaata Khoonti Ke Rengoeaa Kamra Khumri Ke Odhoeyya Daya Maya Le Ja Re
6. Adbad Gothiathas Tain Mann Ke Bharam La O
7. Lage Raithe Diwana Tor Bar Mor Maya Lage Raithe
