= H. Sridhar =

Indian sound engineer

H.Sridhar

Background information
- Born: Kerala, India
- Occupation: Audio engineer
- Years active: 1958–2008

H. Sridhar (Sridhar Hariharan/H.Padmanabh) was an Indian sound engineer known for his work with the Indian musician A. R. Rahman.

Sridhar was the Chief Audio Engineer at Media Artists Chennai. A mathematics graduate, with keen interest in electronics and formal music training, he started a professional sound engineering career in 1988. He had engineered over 200 films and worked closely with directors like Mani Ratnam, K Balachandar, Bharathiraaja, Shankar, Kamal Hassan, P C Sreeram, Priyadarsan, Sibi Malayil and Ramgopal Varma.

Among Sridhar's many professional credits was that he engineered all songs and background scores for the renowned music director A. R. Rahman. Some ground-breaking films to his credit are Roja, Gentleman, Kadhalan, Thiruda Thiruda, Bombay, Duet, Mahanadi, Rangeela, Kuruthippunnal, Muthu, Indian, Minsaara Kanavu and Iruvar. He also engineered the background music score and songs for the national award-winning film Kalapani for music director Ilaiyaraaja and Minasaara Kanavu for music director A. R. Rahman.

Having pioneered the use of Digital Sound for Indian films in the DTS format, Sridhar successfully completed six-track surround sound mixing for more than 200 films including Karuppu Roja, Siraichaalai, Indian, Bharatheeyudu, Hindustani, Paeyi, Iruvar, Minsaara Kanavu, Sapnay, Ziddi, Judwaa, My Dear Kuttichathan 3D, V I P, Aflatoon, Devathai, Chhota Chetan, Pyar Kiya To Darna Kya, Satya, Jeans, Dil Se.., Kadhalar Dinam, Padayappa, Mudhalvan, Pukaar, Alai Payuthey, Kandukondain Kandukondai, Kushi, among others.

Sridhar also engineered and mixed albums for international artists like George Harrison of The Beatles, John Neptune Kaizan, Pandit Ravi Shankar, Zakir Hussain, L.Shankar and John McLaughlin (Mahavishnu Orchestra & Shakti fame).

He died in the morning of 1 December 2008 due to cardiac problems.

== Awards ==
Grammy Awards

- Grammy Award for Best Compilation Soundtrack Album for a Motion Picture, Television or Other Visual Media – 'Jai Ho' – Slumdog Millionaire (2010)

National Film Awards

- National Film Award for Best Audiography – Mahanadi (1994)
- National Film Award for Best Audiography – Dil Se.. (1999)
- National Film Award for Best Audiography – Lagaan (2002)
- National Film Award for Best Audiography – Kannathil Muthamittal (2003)

Tamil Nadu State Film Awards

- Tamil Nadu State Film Award for Best Audiographer – Karuppu Roja (1996)

Mirchi Music Awards

- Best Song Mixing & Engineering – "Dilli-6" from Delhi-6 (2009)

V. Shantaram Awards

- Best Sound award – Dasavathaaram (2009)

== Recordings ==
1. Slumdog Millionaire (2009) (Sound Engineer)
2. Connections (2009) (Sound Design & Final Mix)
3. Ghajini (2008) (Sound Design and Music Mixing Engineer)
4. Dasavathaaram (2008) (Sound Design & Final Mix)
5. Jodhaa Akbar (2008) (Music Mix & Song Mix)
6. Cheeni Kum (2007) (Sound Design & Final Mix)
7. Bombil and Beatrice (2007) ( Audiography & ReRecording Mixer)
8. Sivaji (2007) (Mixing Engineer)
9. Guru (2007) (Audiography)
10. Dharam (2007) ( Mixing Engineer)
11. Provoked (2006) (sound re-recording mixer)
12. Godfather (2006) (sound engineer)
13. Water (2005) (additional music editing) (sound engineer)
14. Ramji Londonwale (2005) (audiographer)
15. Ah Aah: Anbe Aaruyire (2005) (sound mixer)
16. Mangal Pandey: The Rising (2005) (music programming) (sound engineer)
17. Swades (2004) (sound engineer) [fr]
18. Aayutha Ezhuthu (2004) (sound engineer)
19. Meenaxi: A Tale of Three Cities (2004) (sound designer)
20. New (2004) (sound mixer)
21. Boys (2003) (sound)
22. Saathiya (2002) (sound designer)
23. Om Jai Jagadish (2002) (sound re-recordist: Media Artists)
24. Hum Kisi Se Kum Nahin (2002) (re-recording and song mixing)
25. Kannathil Muthamittal (2002) (sound mixer) (sound mixer)
26. Nayak: The Real Hero (2001) (sound recordist)
27. Dil Chahta Hai (2001) (final mixing)
28. Lagaan (2001) (final mixing engineer) (song recording)
29. Kushi (2000) (sound mixer)
30. Tera Jadoo Chal Gayaa (2000) (sound re-recordist: Media Artist, Chennai)
31. Kandukondain Kandukondain (2000) (sound mixer)
32. Pukar (2000) (sound re-recordist: Media Artist, Chennai)
33. Alai Payuthey (2000) (sound mixer)
34. Thakshak (1999) (sound mixer)
35. Mast (1999) (audiography)
36. Padayappa (1999) (sound mixer)
37. Vaastav: The Reality (1999) (re-recording and mixing: Media Artist)
38. Sooryavansham (1999) (audiography: Media Artists)
39. Kadhalar Dinam (1999) (sound mixer)
40. Mudhalvan (1999) (sound mixer)
41. Kaun (1999) (sound designer)
42. Bade Miyan Chote Miyan (1998) (re-recordist: Media Artist)
43. Jeans (1998) (sound mixer)
44. Dil Se.. (1998) (audiography) (song recordist: Panchathan Records Inn) (sound mixer: Panchathan Records Inn)
45. Satya (1998) (sound designer)
46. Pyar Kiya To Darna Kya (1998) (sound mixer)
47. Kabhi Na Kabhi (1998) (song recordist: Panchathan Recording Inn, Madras) (as Sridhar) (sound re-recordist: Panchathan Recording Inn, Madras)
48. Aflatoon (1997) (sound re-recordist: Media Artists, Chennai)
49. Judwaa (1997) (sound mixer)
50. Ziddi (1997) (sound mixer)
51. Daud: Fun on the Run (1997) (music mixer)
52. Iruvar (1997) (sound mixer)
53. Devathai (1997) (sound mixer)
54. Minsara Kanavu (1997) (sound mixer)
55. Jeet (1996) (background music recordist)
56. Indian (1996) (sound mixer)
57. Karuppu Roja (1996) (sound mixer)
58. Bombay (1995) (song recordist) (sound re-recordist)
59. Muthu (1995) (music mixer: Media Artistes)
60. Kuruthipunal (1995) (music mixer: Media Artistes)
61. Rangeela (1995) (music mixer: Media Artistes) (sound effects: Media Artistes)
62. Duet (1994) (music mixer: Media Artistes)
63. Mahanadhi (1994) (music mixer: Media Artistes)
64. Thiruda Thiruda (1993) (sound mixer)
65. Gentleman (1993) (sound mixer)
66. Roja (1992) (music mixer: Media Artistes)

== See also ==
- A. R. Rahman – Ace Music director
- Panchathan Record Inn and AM Studios – Rahman's own recording studio
