= Silk Route (band) =

Indian musical band

- Origin: Delhi, India
- Genres: Folk; Indipop; sufi rock
- Years active: 1996–2002
- Past members: Mohit Chauhan; Kem Trivedi; Atul Mittal; Kenny Puri

Silk Route was an Indian band consisting of Mohit Chauhan (lead vocals, guitar),) Atul Mittal (guitar, clarinet, backing vocals), Kem Trivedi (keyboards), and Kenny Puri (drums, percussion). They formed in 1996 and released their debut album, Boondein, two years later. They broke up in 2002.

== Band members ==
- Mohit Chauhan – vocals, guitar
- Kem Trivedi – keyboards
- Atul Mittal – guitar, clarinet, backing vocals
- Kenny Puri – drums, percussion

== Discography ==
- Boondein (1998)
