= 2nd Mirchi Music Awards =

Indian film music awards in 2010

- Sponsored by: Airtel
- Date: February 10, 2010
- Location: Bandra Kurla Complex, Mumbai
- Country: India
- Presented by: Radio Mirchi

Highlights
- Most awards: Delhi-6 (8)
- Song of the Year: "Masakali" - Delhi-6
- Album of the Year: Delhi-6
- Website: Music Mirchi Awards 2009

Television/radio coverage
- Network: Sony TV

The 2nd Mirchi Music Awards, presented by the Radio Mirchi, honoured the best of Hindi music from the year 2009. The ceremony was held on 10 February 2010 at the Bandra Kurla Complex, Mumbai. There were many performances, including those by KK, Sunidhi Chauhan, Rekha Bhardwaj, Himesh Reshammiya, Usha Uthup, Shahid Kapoor and Katrina Kaif. A non-film category award was included for the first time. Delhi-6 won a leading eight awards including Album of the Year and Song of the Year for "Masakali". The show was broadcast on 21 February 2010 on Sony TV.

== Winners and nominees ==
The winners were selected by the members of jury, chaired by Javed Akhtar. The following are the names of winners.

=== Film awards ===
Category	Recipient	Song	Film
Song of the Year	-	"Masakali"	Delhi-6
Album of the Year	A.R Rahman, Prasoon Joshi	-	Delhi-6
Male Vocalist of the Year	Mohit Chauhan	"Masakali"	Delhi-6
Female Vocalist of the Year	Rekha Bhardwaj	"Genda Phool"	Delhi-6
Music Composer of the Year	A.R Rahman	"Masakali"	Delhi-6
Lyricist of the Year	Prasoon Joshi	"Masakali"	Delhi-6
Upcoming Male Vocalist of the Year	Raja Hasan	"Dhun Lagi"	Jai Veeru
Upcoming Female Vocalist of the Year	Aditi Singh Sharma	"Yahi Meri Zindagi"	Dev.D
Upcoming Music Composer of The Year	Jeet Ganguly	"Bhor Bhayo"	Morning Walk
Upcoming Lyricist of The Year	Amitabh Bhattacharya	"Emosanal Attyachar (Brass Band Version)"	Dev.D

=== Technical awards ===
Category	Recipient	Song	Film
Best Song Arranger & Programmer	A.R Rahman	"Masakali"	Delhi-6
Best Song Mixing & Engineering	H. Sridhar, S. Sivakumar, P. A. Deepak and Vivianne Chaix	"Dilli-6"	Delhi-6
Best Background Score	Raju Singh	-	Raaz: The Mystery Continues

=== Special awards ===
Special Jury Award for Exceptional Non Film Music Achievement	"Saeen bina darad kareje haye" sung by Rashid Khan
Jury Award for Outstanding Contribution to Hindi Film Music	Kersi Lord
K. L. Saigal Sangeet Shehenshah Award	Manna Dey

=== Listeners' Choice awards ===
Listeners' Choice Song of the Year	"Iktara" - Wake Up Sid
Listeners' Choice Album of the Year	Ajab Prem Ki Ghazab Kahani

=== Films with multiple wins ===
Films that received multiple awards
Wins	Film
8	Delhi-6
2	Dev.D

== Jury ==
The jury was chaired by Javed Akhtar. Other members were:

- Aadesh Shrivastava - music composer and singer
- Alka Yagnik - playback singer
- Anu Malik - music director
- Lalit Pandit - composer
- Kailash Kher - singer
- Kavita Krishnamurthy - playback singer
- Louis Banks - composer, record producer and singer
- Prasoon Joshi - lyricist and screenwriter
- Rakeysh Omprakash Mehra - filmmaker and screenwriter
- Ramesh Sippy - director and producer
- Sadhana Sargam - playback singer
- Shankar Mahadevan - composer and playback singer
- Sukhwinder Singh - playback singer
- Suresh Wadkar - playback singer

== See also ==
- Mirchi Music Awards
