= Masakali =

Song by A. R. Rahman featuring Mohit Chauhan

from the album Delhi-6 : Music From The Motion Picture
- Released: 14 January 2009
- Recorded: 2008; Panchathan Record Inn
- Genre: Feature film soundtrack
- Length: 4:50
- Label: T-Series; Sony Music
- Composer: A. R. Rahman
- Lyricist: Prasoon Joshi
- Producer: A. R. Rahman

"Masakali" is a Hindi song from the 2009 Bollywood film Delhi-6. It was composed by A. R. Rahman, sung by Mohit Chauhan and lyrics penned by Prasoon Joshi. The song was released as part of the soundtrack album of the film on 14 January 2009 at the Indian Idol 4 competition. This song is remade as "Masakali 2.0" sung by Sachet Tandon and Tulsi Kumar from the film Marjaavaan.

== Release ==
The song was released as part of the soundtrack album of the film on 14 January 2009 at the Indian Idol 4 competition. The first video of the song "Masakali" was released featuring Sonam Kapoor and Abhishek Bachchan with a pigeon. However, the song was not part of the original film. According to the director, "The song was not really meant to be part of the narrative. I mean, who would think of putting in a song about a dove in a film like Delhi-6? It just happened. When I came to the pre-climax portion of my script, I was stuck. I needed a continuity link taking the narrative to its finale".

== Reception ==
=== Chart performance ===
The song got excellent responses and soon became the chart topper of the year. It ranked #2 in the 2009 top songs list of The Times of India. They commented on the song, " This expressive number from the film Delhi-6, sung by Mohit Chauhan, bowled people over. An AR Rahman composition, it's a free flowing, addictive, fun song. Masakalli is still being played on music channels and radio and it's expected to stay with music buffs for some time to come, owing to its joyful mood." The song topped the Indian charts for more than 34 continuous weeks and was declared as the most successful song of that year.

=== Awards ===
The song along with the soundtrack album, swept all the major music awards of the year. It emerged as the biggest winner in the Airtel Mirchi Music Awards - 2009 by winning the following categories.

- Best Song of the Year
- Best Music Director of the Year - A. R. Rahman
- Best Male vocalist of the Year - Mohit Chauhan
- Best Lyricist of the Year - Prasoon Joshi
- Best Song Arranger and Programmer - A. R. Rahman

=== Criticism ===
In an interview about the lost literary elements of songs, ghazal singer Jagjit Singh dashed out against Prasoon Joshi for using the word "Masakali". He says, "Do you understand the meaning of "Jai Ho" or "Masakali"? I did not understand." (The former song is Academy Award-winning work by Rahman and noted poet Gulzar).

== In popular culture ==
- A popular kurti style adapted the name of the song.
- A remake, "Masakali 2.0" which was recreated for 2019 film Marjaavaan, but was released on 8 April 2020 as an independent single, performed by Sachet Tandon and Tulsi Kumar and recomposed by Tanishk Bagchi.

=== Masakali 2.0 Controversies ===
Unlike the original, the remix was panned by the makers of the original, including composer A. R. Rahman, lyricist Prasoon Joshi and singer Mohit Chauhan, calling it inferior to the original. Tanishk Bagchi, the creator of the song, was also trolled on entertainment websites and social media platforms.
