= Prasoon Joshi =

Indian poet, lyricist, screenwriter, producer

Prasoon Joshi PS
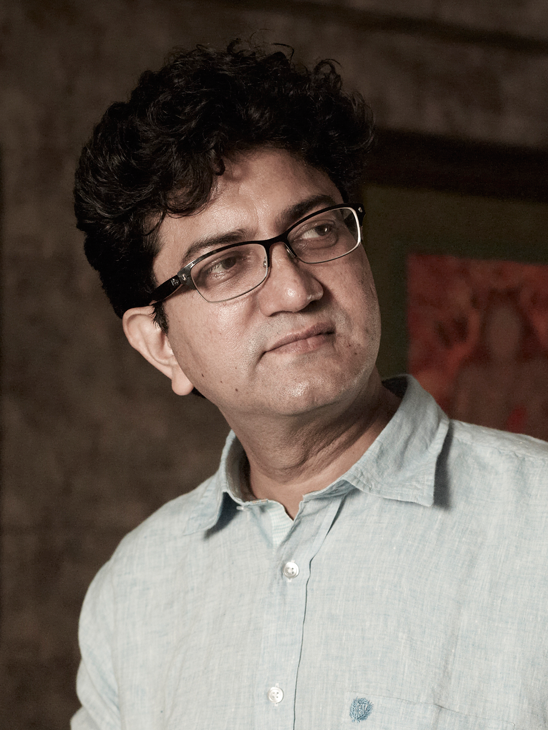
- Joshi in 2014
- Born: 16 September 1971 (age 54); Almora, Uttar Pradesh (present–day Uttarakhand), India
- Occupations: Poet, writer, communication specialist
- Years active: 1992–present
- Awards: Filmfare Best Lyricist Award (2007, 2008, and 2014); National Film Award for Best Lyrics (2007 and 2013); Cannes Lions Gold (2003); IFAA (2007, 2010 and 2014)
- Honours: Padma Shri (2015); Doctorate D.Litt. from Kumaun University (2018); Doctorate D.Phil. from Amity University (2017); Hakim Khan Sur Award for value for the cause of national integration (2016); Maharaja Sayajirao Bhasha Samman for Hindi (2015); Distinguished Alumni from IMT Ghaziabad

Chairperson of Central Board of Film Certification
- In office 12 August 2017 – 2 May 2026
- Preceded by: Pahlaj Nihalani
- Succeeded by: Shashi Shekhar Vempati

Chairperson of Prasar Bharati
- Incumbent
- Assumed office 2 May 2026
- Preceded by: Navneet Kumar Sehgal

Prasoon Joshi (born 16 September 1971) is an Indian poet, writer, lyricist, screenwriter, communication specialist and marketer. He is the former CEO of McCann World group India and Chairman APAC (Asia Pacific), then a subsidiary of the global marketing firm McCann Erickson, and served as the Chairperson of the Central Board of Film Certification from August 2017 to May 2026. On May 2, 2026, he was appointed as the chairperson of Prasar Bharati.

Prasoon has received the Filmfare Best Lyricist Award three times, in 2007 and 2008 and again in 2014 for the Hindi movie Bhaag Milkha Bhaag. He has also received the National Film Award for Best Lyrics twice, for his work in Taare Zameen Par (2007), and Chittagong (2013). He was awarded Padma Shri by the Government of India in 2015, for his contributions towards the field of Arts, Literature and Advertising. He is one of the trustees of IGNCA, a member of Nehru Memorial Museum & Library Society Panel and is among the select 120 members of the National Committee for Commemoration of 150th Birth Anniversary of Mahatma Gandhi.

== Early life and education ==
Prasoon Joshi spent his earliest years in the north Indian state of Uttarakhand (then part of Uttar Pradesh). His father, D.K. Joshi, was the Additional Director of the state's Education Service. These early years all across the northern India – and spending time in places like Almora, Nainital (where his extended family and relatives still live), Tehri, Chamoli Gopeshwar, and later Rampur, Meerut and Delhi – gave Prasoon a remarkable feel for the real Indian pulse that he is now celebrated for in his screenplays, dialogues, lyrics, and advertising. His mother, Sushma Joshi, a lecturer in political science, performed for the All India Radio for over three decades. Due to the fact his parents were both qualified classical vocalists, Daily home life for the young Prasoon was marked with academic discipline, a rich vein of the artistic life and a strong sense of music and culture.

He started writing early in life and published his first book at age 17, Main Aur Woh, a 'conversation with himself'. Two more books Dard So Raha Hai and Samadhan followed establishing him as an author.

His book, Sunshine Lanes, a collection of his songs, was launched at the Jaipur Literature Festival in January 2013. Prasoon's latest book ‘Thinking Aloud’ a collection of essays on emerging India was published in 2016.

Prasoon did his BSc and post graduation in Physics, then elected to pursue an MBA from Institute Of Management Technology, Ghaziabad. During his MBA education he decided to fuse his love for culture and art and his faculty for the commercial dynamic and make his career in advertising.

== Advertising ==
Prasoon started his career with Ogilvy & Mather in Delhi. In just 10 years, he was appointed the Executive Creative Director of the Mumbai office. In early 2002, he joined McCann-Erickson as Executive Vice-President and National Creative Director. By 2006, he was the Regional Creative Director for South and South East Asia. In December 2006 he was promoted to Executive Chairman for McCann Worldgroup India and Regional Creative Director for Asia Pacific.

Joshi is known for creating brand-building work for multinational brands including Nestle, Coca cola, Microsoft, Mastercard, L’Oréal, Intel X Box, Reckitt Benckiser, Unilever, Perfetti, J&J, as well as Indian Brands like Britannia, Saffola, Dabur, ITC foods, TVS motors, Reliance, Reliance Jio, Paytm, RadioMirchi, and media brands like NDTV India (Sach dikhate hain hum), Times Now, CNBC, CNN IBN, and the Cannes-winning Thanda matlab Coca-Cola campaign with Aamir Khan.

His Happydent television commercial was listed by Bob Garfield of AdvertisingAge as one of his personal choices for the Cannes Gold in 2007, and it was chosen by a Gunn Report poll as one of the 20 best ads of the 21st century.

His works were utilized for various social campaigns in India: Swacch Bharat, education, polio eradication, malnutrition, women empowerment, child rights, against student suicide, and UN millennium goals. His contribution was acknowledged for the 2014, and subsequently 2019 elections.

== Film career ==
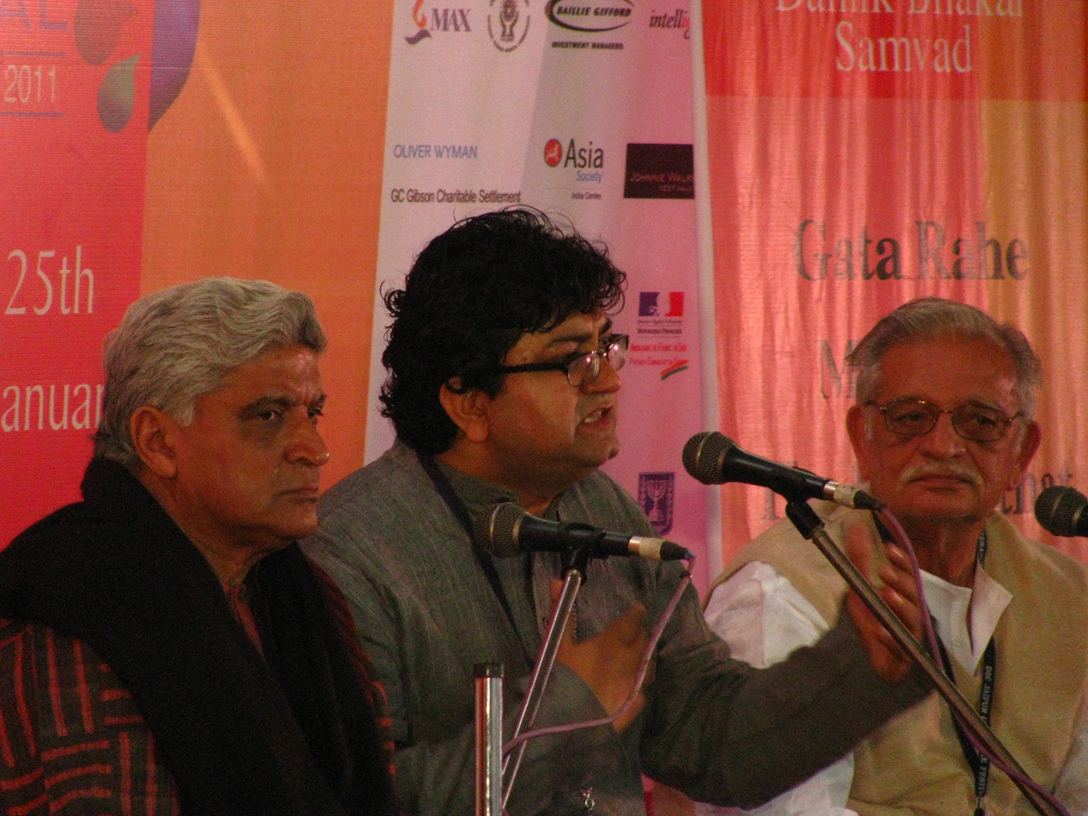
Javed Akhtar, Prasoon Joshi and Gulzar

Prasoon made his debut as a film lyricist with Rajkumar Santoshi's Lajja, a critical and commercial success, and this soon led to Yash Chopra's Hum Tum and a string of highly successful Bollywood films like Fanaa, Rang De Basanti, Taare Zameen Par, Black and Delhi 6. With Rang De Basanti (2006), he also became a dialogue writer.

He won the Filmfare Best Lyricist Award for "Chand Sifarish" from the film Fanaa in 2007 and for "Maa" from Taare Zameen Par in 2008. He has won the prestigious National Award twice. The first for his work in Taare Zameen Par and the second one in 2013 for Chittagong.

He has also written the script for the award-winning 2014 film Bhaag Milkha Bhaag.

As a CBFC chairman he has maintained the fine balance between the filmmakers and societal sensitivities, instituted dialogue discussion instead of controversy and has played a big role in digitising CBFC functionality.

== Global and national recognition ==
In 2008, he was invited as the Cannes Jury chairman and in 2009, he was named among the exclusive 10-member Cannes Titanium and Integrated Jury at the Cannes Lions International Advertising Festival. In 2006, he was chosen a 'Young Global Leader 2006' by the Forum of Young Global Leaders, an affiliate of the World Economic Forum, In 2007, he was asked to be a judge of the nationally popular reality singing competition Dhoom Macha De on NDTV Imagine. Joshi was part of the select three-member Core Creative Advisory Committee for the Commonwealth Games 2010 opening and closing ceremonies, with Shyam Benegal and Javed Akhtar.

=== Social theme work ===
- Tata Jagriti Anthem
- Dettol Swachh Bharat
- Poshan Anthem

== Filmography ==
- Manikarnika: The Queen of Jhansi (2019)
- Vishwaroop II (2018)
- Neerja (2016)
- Margarita With A Straw (2015)
- Satyagraha (2013)
- Bhaag Milkha Bhaag (2013)
- Ishkq in Paris (2012)
- Teri Meri Kahaani (2012)
- Aarakshan (2011)
- Break Ke Baad (2010)
- Sikandar (2009)
- London Dreams (2009)
- Delhi 6 (2009)
- Ghajini (2008)
- Thoda Pyaar Thoda Magic (2008)
- Taare Zameen Par (2007)
- Fanaa (2006)
- Rang De Basanti (2006)
- Black (2005)
- Rok Sako To Rok Lo (2004)
- Phir Milenge (2004)
- Hum Tum (2004)
- Aankhen (2002)
- Kyon? (2003)
- Love at Times Square (2003)
- Lajja (2001)
- Bhopal Express (1999)

When Prasoon watched the film Sikander, he was inspired by it and wrote a song called "Dhoop ke sikke". Later, this song was incorporated in the film.

=== Private albums ===
He has been the lyricist for several Indipop albums which have been hits:

- Mann Ke Manjeere, an album on women's dreams for human rights organisation Breakthrough, sung by Shubha Mudgal (2000)
- Ab Ke Saawan for Shubha Mudgal (1999)
- Dooba Dooba Rehta Hoon for Silk Route

== Short films on malnutrition ==
Prasoon Joshi and Aamir Khan have decided to prepare 50 short films on malnutrition after being invited by the Prime Minister of India. According to Mr. Joshi, Aamir and himself got along well because they do not compromise their work.

== Awards ==
He was awarded Padma Shri, the fourth highest civilian award of India, in 2015.

| Year | Nominated work | Award | Category | Result |
|---|---|---|---|---|
| 2003 | Thanda Matlab Coca-Cola campaign | Cannes Lion Award | International Advertising Festival | Won |
| 2005 | Hum Tum | Screen Awards | Best Lyricist (for the song "'Hum Tum'") | Won |
| 2007 | Rang De Basanti | Media magazine | No. 1 Creative Director in Asia Pacific | Won |
| 2007 | Rang De Basanti | Zee Cine Awards | Best Lyricist (for the song " "Masti Ki Pathshala") | Won |
| 2007 | Rang De Basanti | Global Indian Film Awards | Best Lyricist | Won |
| 2007 | Rang De Basanti | Filmfare Awards | Best Dialogue | Nominated |
| 2007 | Rang De Basanti | Filmfare Awards | Best Lyricist (for the song "Roobaroo") | Nominated |
| 2007 | Fanaa | Filmfare Awards | Best Lyricist (for the song "Chand Sifarish") | Won |
| 2007 | Fanaa | International Indian Film Academy Awards | Best Lyricist (for the song "Chand Sifarish") | Won |
| 2007 | Fanaa | Bollywood Movie Awards | Best Lyricist (for the song "Chand Sifarish") | Won |
| 2008 | Taare Zameen Par | National Film Awards | Best Lyricist (for the song "Maa") | Won |
| 2008 | Taare Zameen Par | Filmfare Awards | Best Lyricist (for the song "Maa") | Won |
| 2008 | Taare Zameen Par | Zee Cine Awards | Best Lyricist (for the song " "Maa") | Won |
| 2008 | Taare Zameen Par | Producers Guild Film Awards | Best Lyricist (for the song " "Maa") | Won |
| 2008 | Taare Zameen Par | Screen Awards | Best Lyricist (for the song " "Maa") | Won |
| 2009 | —N/a | NDTV Indian of the Year | Special Award for Lyrics | Won |
| 2009 | Ghajini | Filmfare Awards | Best Lyricist (for the song "Guzarish") | Nominated |
| 2010 | Delhi-6 | Filmfare Awards | Best Lyricist (for the song "Masakali") | Nominated |
| 2010 | Delhi-6 | Filmfare Awards | Best Lyricist (for the song "Rehna Tu") | Nominated |
| 2010 | Delhi-6 | 2nd Mirchi Music Awards | Album of The Year | Won |
| 2010 | Delhi-6 | 2nd Mirchi Music Awards | Lyricist of The Year (for the song "Masakali") | Won |
| 2010 | Break Ke Baad | 3rd Mirchi Music Awards | Album of The Year | Nominated |
| 2011 | Aarakshan | 4th Mirchi Music Awards | Upcoming Music Composer of The Year (for the song "Saans Albeli") | Nominated |
| 2012 | Chittagong | National Film Awards | Best Lyricist (for the song "Bolo Naa") | Won |
| 2014 | Bhaag Milkha Bhaag | Filmfare Awards | Best Lyricist (for the song "Zinda") | Won |
| 2014 | Bhaag Milkha Bhaag | International Indian Film Academy Awards | Best Screenplay | Won |
| 2014 | Bhaag Milkha Bhaag | International Indian Film Academy Awards | Best Story | Won |
| 2014 | Bhaag Milkha Bhaag | International Indian Film Academy Awards | Best Dialogue | Won |
| 2014 | Bhaag Milkha Bhaag | Producers Guild Film Awards | Best Screenplay | Won |
| 2014 | Bhaag Milkha Bhaag | Producers Guild Film Awards | Best Story | Won |
| 2014 | Bhaag Milkha Bhaag | Mirchi Music Awards | Lyricist of The Year (for the song "Maston Ka Jhund") | Won |
| 2015 | —N/a | Government of India | Padma Shri (for contribution in Arts) | Honorary |
| 2021 | Film personality | 52nd International Film Festival of India | Indian Film Personality of the Year | Honoured |

== Personal life ==
Prasoon's wife Aparna works in the field of preserving and promoting Indian classical and folk music and is the co-founder of the India Music Summit. They have been married for over a decade and have a daughter named Aishaanya.
