= Delhi-6 =

2009 drama film by Rakeysh Omprakash Mehra

- Theatrical release poster
- Directed by: Rakesh Omprakash Mehra
- Screenplay by: Rakesh Omprakash Mehra; Prasoon Joshi; Kamlesh Pandey
- Story by: Rakesh Omprakash Mehra; Kamlesh Pandey
- Based on: Monkey-man of Delhi
- Produced by: Rakesh Omprakash Mehra; Ronnie Screwvala
- Starring: Abhishek Bachchan; Sonam Kapoor; Aditi Rao Hydari; Rishi Kapoor; Supriya Pathak; Atul Kulkarni; Pavan Malhotra; Divya Dutta; Deepak Dobriyal; Vijay Raaz; Om Puri; Waheeda Rehman; Prem Chopra
- Cinematography: Binod Pradhan
- Edited by: P. S. Bharathi
- Music by: A. R. Rahman
- Production company: Rakeysh Omprakash Mehra Pictures
- Distributed by: UTV Motion Pictures
- Release date: 20 February 2009
- Running time: 140 minutes
- Country: India
- Language: Hindi
- Budget: ₹48 crore
- Box office: est. ₹52.17 crore

Delhi-6 is a 2009 Indian Hindi-language drama film directed by Rakesh Omprakash Mehra. The film stars Abhishek Bachchan as an NRI who arrives in India with his ailing grandmother (played by Waheeda Rehman) and begins discovering his roots before getting embroiled in a religious dispute involving a mysterious monkey-like attacker. The film co-stars Sonam Kapoor, Aditi Rao Hydari, Rishi Kapoor, Supriya Pathak, Atul Kulkarni, Pavan Malhotra, Deepak Dobriyal, Divya Dutta, Vijay Raaz and Om Puri. It marks the Hindi film debut of Rao Hydari. The number 6 refers to the Postal Index Number (PIN) of the Chandni Chowk area of Old Delhi, a shortened form of 110006. It is Mehra's third film after Aks (2001) and Rang De Basanti (2006). The film's soundtrack, composed by A. R. Rahman, was a commercial success and received positive reviews from music critics upon release.

Following international premieres at the Dubai International Film Festival as well as the Museum of Modern Art, Delhi-6 was released on 20 February 2009 and was a commercial failure at the box office. Despite failing commercially, it received mixed reviews from critics, with praise for its soundtrack and performances of the cast, but criticism for its story, screenplay and pacing.

At the 57th National Film Awards, Delhi-6 won Best Production Design (Samir Chanda) in addition to winning the Nargis Dutt Award for Best Feature Film on National Integration. The version submitted to the National Awards featured an alternate ending favoured by Mehra, which was unavailable to the general public and shown only in a limited one-week theatrical release as well as the Venice Film Festival. Additionally, at the 55th Filmfare Awards, the film received 7 nominations, including Best Supporting Actress (Dutta), and won 3 awards, including Best Music Director (A. R. Rahman). The film has over the years become notable for its soundtrack.

== Plot ==
Roshan accompanies his dying grandmother Annapurna to their ancestral property in Old Delhi where he is initially stunned by the mad rush of neighbours: Ali Baig the renaissance man, feuding brothers Madangopal and Jaigopal, their wives and families, Mamdu the confectioner, Gobar the simpleton, Sethji and many others.

Roshan accompanies Annapurna to the Ramleelas, hangs out at Mamdu's sweet stall, plays with the children, and gradually becomes steeped in the culture. When Annapurna faints due to fluctuating blood sugar levels and everyone scrambles to get her to a hospital, Roshan finds the roads choked by traffic because of an impromptu ceremony around a cow in labour; he is further surprised when Annapurna, despite her stupor, stumbles forth to seek the blessings of the cow and the local police seem to encourage the practice. Roshan begins to understand the feuds and social issues in the community.

Madangopal's sister Rama is unwed and Jaigopal's electrical business is going nowhere. The lecherous old local money lender Lala Bhairam's wife Shashi is having an affair with a young photo-studio hand Suresh, a double timer also pursuing Madangopal's daughter Bittu who secretly prepares to audition for the popular reality show Indian Idol. Roshan is surprised to learn that Ali Baig fancied his mother Fatima many years ago and has since never married. Roshan also comes to empathize with the caste-oppressed trash collector girl Jalebi, and crosses paths with the loutish inspector Ranvijay who blithely stretches his authorities to manhandle the locals.

On the other hand, the media is all abuzz with tales of a miscreant known as the "Kala Bandar" who attacks, steals and has caused the death of a few innocent people. After some initial friction, Roshan and Bittu warm to each other. Roshan intervenes when he learns of Madangopal trying to get Bittu married against her wishes, but earns Madangopal's wrath. While supporting her dreams, he gradually begins to fall in love with her. Bittu too begins to reciprocate but is left saddened by the news of his return to America. Later when Roshan confronts Bittu after Madangopal fixes her marriage forcibly, he is disappointed when she expresses her plan of eloping with Suresh in order to achieve her dreams, unaware of his hidden affair with Shashi and his other intentions.

Around this time, the Kala Bandar attacks Old Delhi. In order to exorcise the demonic influence of the Kala Bandar, the locals bring in a tantrik Shani baba who speculates that the local mosque must have been built over the ruins of a temple that was demolished for the purpose, thus initiating a vicious cycle of animosity in the previously harmonious Hindu-Muslim community. After the initial peaceful demonstrations, a mob goes on rampage and attacks some of the Muslims and their shops, including Mamdu's sweet shop. This prompts Mamdu to set fire to the tree temple. Roshan attempts to make peace but is rebuffed because of his mixed religious parentage. The locals ultimately settle on the fact that the Kala Bandar is hiding out in the sooni galli (a dark lane known to harbour evil presences), and command Gobar to fetch a lock of hair from the evil enemy so that the tantrik can burn it and complete the exorcism.

Roshan realizes his affection for Bittu. He decides to stop her and confess his love upon Ali Baig's advice. Donning a monkey outfit, he stealthily following Bittu by leaping across the rooftops. In the meantime, Gobar ventures into the sooni galli where Jalebi gives him a lock of her hair so he may return in triumph and bring peace to the community. At that moment, Roshan (in his monkey outfit) intercedes in Bittu and Suresh's rendezvous and causes the cowardly Suresh to flee. Bittu raises a loud alarm before Roshan unmasks himself, expresses his feelings for her which she reciprocates. The angry locals storm the place and beat up Roshan, believing him to be the Kala Bandar, before Mamdu shoots him. Gobar then proclaims that the Kala Bandar is in fact the vices residing inside the people of Delhi-6 and something they must defeat within themselves. The neighbourhood realizes this and arranges for an ambulance. Roshan does not respond to the treatment, leaving people to believe that he died. In the meantime, the nearly dying Roshan meets his dead grandfather who reveals that there is a Kala Bandar in his own heart and that is why he wanted to ask forgiveness to his daughter-in-law, Fatima, for not accepting her inter-religious marriage. Soon, he responds to the treatment and survives, much to everyone's happiness. He remembers Ali Baig's words, "Who can ever wish to leave Delhi's lanes?" rejoicing all with his wish to stay there forever. Roshan narrates that it is the Kala Bandar which is like the demon king Ravana, which can create hatred and division among human beings. At the end he concludes that he returned to his home, which he now considers to be Delhi 6.

=== Alternate ending ===
Gobar concludes it is the Kala Bandar (inside everyone's hearts) who killed Roshan. Meeting his dead grandfather in a dream, Roshan searches for his phone, which in reality drops from his hand as the screen cuts black. He is revealed to be dead after his ashes are immersed in a river through the same earthen pot Annapurna had purchased for her own ashes to be immersed after her death. The narration closes with Roshan recalling her words, "You will merge with the soil of which you are born."

== Cast ==
As per the film's end credits.

- Waheeda Rehman as Annapurna Mehra (Dadi)
- Abhishek Bachchan as Roshan Mehra
- Sonam Kapoor as Bittu Sharma
- Rishi Kapoor as Ali Baig
- Om Puri as Madangopal Sharma
- Prem Chopra as Lala Bhairam
- Atul Kulkarni as Gobar
- Pavan Malhotra as Jai Gopal Sharma
- Divya Dutta as Jalebi
- Supriya Pathak as Vimla Sharma
- Tanvi Azmi as Fatima Mehra
- Vijay Raaz as Inspector Ranvijay Thakur
- Deepak Dobriyal as Mamdu
- Raghubir Yadav as singer at Ramleela
- K. K. Raina as Haji Sulaiman
- Akhilendra Mishra as Tantrik Baba
- Daya Shankar Pandey as Kumar Kulshrestha
- Sheeba Chaddha as Rajjo Bhabhi
- Cyrus Sahukar as Suresh
- Aditi Rao Hydari as Rama Sharma
- Rajat Dholakia
- Geeta Agarwal as MLA Maitreyi Devi
- Geeta Bisht as Shashi
- Indrajit Sarkar
- Rajiv Mathur
- Vinayak Doval as Bobby
- Hussan Saad as Bhisham
- Amitabh Bachchan as Mr. Mehra, Roshan's grandfather (special appearance)

== Production ==
=== Development and casting ===
In the early stages of development it was rumored that Rakeysh was going to cast newcomers for his next film. It was even reported that Aamir Khan's nephew Imran Khan would make his debut with Delhi-6 but this was later revealed to be Jaane Tu Ya Jaane Na (2008). Frequent changes in casting made headlines, with Hrithik Roshan being set to play the main character and then being reportedly replaced by Ranbir Kapoor. Even Akshay Kumar was supposed to play the lead but refused. Rakeysh Omprakash Mehra stated that Abhishek Bachchan was always the first choice for Delhi-6. Date problems for Abhishek Bachchan caused delays, but it all worked out in the end with Abhishek portraying the lead actor. Post the refusal from Asin Thottumkal, Sonam Kapoor was paired as the leading female character opposite Abhishek Bachchan. Rishi Kapoor and Tanvi Azmi are also a part of the film. The film went on the floors on 20 February 2008. Amitabh Bachchan plays the grandfather to Roshan, played by Abhishek Bachchan, whereas Waheeda Rehman plays the grandmother of the same.

=== Filming ===
Production designer Samir Chanda, who had earlier worked with Mehra on Aks and Rang De Basanti, recreated the inner lanes of Old Delhi at Sambhar, a town in Rajasthan with similar architecture. Also, for some scenes, the historic Jama Masjid was digitally added to the frame as a backdrop. Editing was done by Meghna Aschit and Rakesh's wife Bharti. In an interview, Rakesh said that he was not involved with the editing.

=== Promotion ===
Delhi-6 was first unveiled at the Dubai International Film Festival. Following the screening was an interactive question and answer round, consisting of the director with the rest of the star cast and a vast audience. During this interaction, Rakeysh spoke about his key influences and the theme of the film, while actors described their experience of working with Rakeysh. A video featuring Abhishek and Sonam's interview can be watched in the reference along with this section. The official trailer was released on 4 January 2009 which featured scenes from Delhi along with Jama Masjid, theatre groups, Red Fort at night, Sonam Kapoor coming out of a public escalator at Central Park in Delhi and finally Abhishek watching Sonam dancing with the pigeon "Masakali" on her head.

== Release ==
The film was supposed to be released on 13 February 2009 to avoid clash with Billu Barber, but A. R. Rahman's continued absence from the project led to a delayed-release. The background score remained incomplete and delayed-release by one week. Delhi-6 was finally released on 20 February 2009 and premiered in New Delhi on 19 February 2009. It had its first screening on 15 February 2009 in New York.

UTV Indiagames also released a promotional mobile video game based on the film.

== Reception ==
=== Critical reception ===
As of 11 March 2009, Rotten Tomatoes has given the film a 40% rating with 3 fresh and 6 rotten reviews.

Pratim D. Gupta of The Telegraph gave two thumbs up, calling it a must-watch for just its "overwhelming audio-visual eruption". Nikhat Kazmi of Times of India rated it three out of five stars, saying, "Watch it for the message of Delhi-6 and the ekdum desi India-feel". Anupama Chopra of NDTV said that the film is a noble failure: "Delhi-6 is ambitious and well-intentioned, but good intentions don’t always translate into good cinema". Rajeev Masand of CNN-IBN gave it 3 stars, saying that it's a story with heart and Delhi-6 isn't great cinema like Mehra's Rang De Basanti and has a frustrating climax. Rachel Saltz of The New York Times stated "Delhi-6 can be maddeningly vague, which robs its ending...of the impact it intends". Shashi Baliga of Hindustan Times gave the film 3 out of 5 saying "Mehra sure has his heart in the right place. But couldn’t he have allowed himself… and us, a little more fun?" Arthur J Pais of Rediff.com gave a much better verdict remarking the film's innovative style and storyline. Amanda Sodhi posted an in-depth write-up about Delhi-6 on PassionForCinema.com, defending it against flak it was receiving.

== Music ==
A. R. Rahman is the music director of this film. Prasoon Joshi is the lyricist. The music was released on 19 January 2009 at the Indian Idol 4 competition. The first video of the song "Masakali" was released featuring Sonam and Abhishek with a pigeon. However, the song was not part of the original film. According to the director, "The song was not really meant to be part of the narrative. I mean, who would think of putting in a song about a dove in a film like Delhi-6? It just happened. When I came to the pre-climax portion of my script, I was stuck. I needed a continuity link taking the narrative to its finale". Other videos released include the title track "Delhi-6", the romantic interlude "Rehna Tu" as well as the folky "Genda Phool," an adaptation of a folk song from Chhattisgarh.

=== Track listing ===
The official track listing.

No.	Title	Artist(s)	Length
1.	"Masakali"	Mohit Chauhan	4:50
2.	"Arziyan"	Javed Ali, Kailash Kher	8:41
3.	"Dilli-6" (French lyrics by Viviane Chaix, Claire)	Blaaze, Benny Dayal, Tanvi Shah, Viviane Chaix, Claire	3:36
4.	"Rehna Tu"	A. R. Rahman, Benny Dayal, Tanvi Shah, Rishu Raj	6:51
5.	"Hey Kaala Bandar"	Karthik, Naresh Iyer, Srinivas, Bonnie Chakraborty, Ember	5:52
6.	"Dil Gira Dafatan"	Ash King, Chinmayi Sripaada	5:39
7.	"Genda Phool"	Rekha Bhardwaj, Shraddha Pandit, Sujata Mazumder, Mahathi	2:50
8.	"Bhor Bhaye" (Raag: Gujri Todi)	Shreya Ghoshal, Ustad Bade Ghulam Ali Khan	3:19
9.	"Aarti (Tumre Bhavan Mein)"	Rekha Bhardwaj, Kishori Amonkar, Shraddha Pandit, Sujata Mazumder	3:01
10.	"Noor" (Recital)	Amitabh Bachchan	0:50

== Inspiration ==
Reports of Kala Bandar (Black Monkey) attacks in the city of Delhi as shown in the film are inspired by real reports of much publicized monkey or monkeyman attacks in and around Delhi in 2001.

== Awards and nominations ==
Date of ceremony	Award	Category	Recipient(s) and nominee(s)	Result	Ref.
8 January 2010	Producers Guild Film Awards	Best Music Director	A. R. Rahman	Nominated	
8 January 2010	Producers Guild Film Awards	Best Sound Recording	Nakul Kamte	Nominated	
8 January 2010	Producers Guild Film Awards	Best Costume Design	Arjun Bhasin; Anamika Khanna	Nominated	
9 January 2010	Screen Awards	Best Supporting Actress	Divya Dutta	Nominated	
9 January 2010	Screen Awards	Best Music Director	A. R. Rahman	Won	
9 January 2010	Screen Awards	Best Male Playback Singer	Mohit Chauhan (for "Masakali")	Nominated	
9 January 2010	Screen Awards	Best Female Playback Singer	Rekha Bhardwaj (for "Genda Phool")	Nominated	
9 January 2010	Screen Awards	Best Art Direction	Samir Chanda	Nominated	
9 January 2010	Screen Awards	Best Ensemble Cast	Delhi-6	Nominated	
17 January 2010	Stardust Awards	Best Film – Drama	Delhi-6	Nominated	
17 January 2010	Stardust Awards	Superstar of Tomorrow – Female	Sonam Kapoor	Nominated	
17 January 2010	Stardust Awards	Best Supporting Actress	Divya Dutta	Nominated	
17 January 2010	Stardust Awards	New Musical Sensation – Male	Mohit Chauhan (for "Masakali")	Nominated	
10 February 2010	Mirchi Music Awards	Album of The Year	Delhi-6	Won	
10 February 2010	Mirchi Music Awards	Music Composer of The Year	A. R. Rahman	Won	
10 February 2010	Mirchi Music Awards	Song of The Year	"Masakali"	Won	
10 February 2010	Mirchi Music Awards	Male Vocalist of The Year	Mohit Chauhan (for "Masakali")	Won	
10 February 2010	Mirchi Music Awards	Female Vocalist of The Year	Rekha Bhardwaj (for "Genda Phool")	Won	
10 February 2010	Mirchi Music Awards	Lyricist of The Year	Prasoon Joshi (for "Masakali")	Won	
10 February 2010	Mirchi Music Awards	Best Song Arranger & Programmer	A. R. Rahman (for "Masakali")	Won	
10 February 2010	Mirchi Music Awards	Best Song Mixing & Engineering	H. Sridhar, S. Sivakumar, P. A. Deepak and Vivianne Chaix (for "Dilli-6")	Won	
27 February 2010	Filmfare Awards	Best Supporting Actress	Divya Dutta	Nominated	
27 February 2010	Filmfare Awards	Best Music Director	A. R. Rahman	Won	
27 February 2010	Filmfare Awards	Best Lyricist	Prasoon Joshi (for "Masakali")	Nominated	
27 February 2010	Filmfare Awards	Best Lyricist	Prasoon Joshi (for "Rehna Tu")	Nominated	
27 February 2010	Filmfare Awards	Best Male Playback Singer	Mohit Chauhan (for "Masakali")	Won	
27 February 2010	Filmfare Awards	Best Male Playback Singer	Javed Ali & Kailash Kher (for "Arziyan")	Nominated	
27 February 2010	Filmfare Awards	Best Female Playback Singer	Rekha Bhardwaj (for "Genda Phool")	Won	
22 March 2010	Asian Film Awards	Best Newcomer	Sonam Kapoor	Nominated	
5 June 2010	International Indian Film Academy Awards	Best Supporting Actress	Divya Dutta	Won	
5 June 2010	International Indian Film Academy Awards	Best Music Director	A. R. Rahman	Nominated	
5 June 2010	International Indian Film Academy Awards	Best Lyricist	Prasoon Joshi (for "Masakali")	Nominated	
5 June 2010	International Indian Film Academy Awards	Best Male Playback Singer	Mohit Chauhan (for "Masakali")	Nominated	
5 June 2010	International Indian Film Academy Awards	Best Female Playback Singer	Rekha Bhardwaj (for "Genda Phool")	Nominated	
22 October 2010	National Film Awards	Best Feature Film on National Integration	Delhi-6	Won	
22 October 2010	National Film Awards	Best Production Design	Samir Chanda	Won	

== See also ==
- Dadaria
