= Shraddha Pandit =

Indian singer

- Also known as: SP, Shradha Pandit
- Born: Shraddha Pandit; 4 July 1982 (age 43); Mumbai, Maharashtra, India
- Origin: Indian
- Genres: Indian classical music, Playback singer, Pop and Bollywood
- Occupations: Singer, lyricist
- Instrument: Vocalist
- Years active: 1996-present

Shraddha Pandit (born 4 July 1982) is an Indian playback singer, solo artist, composer, and lyricist.

== Early life ==
Shraddha is the daughter of Vishwaraj Pandit and Swarna Pandit. She is the grand-niece of Indian classical vocalist and Padma Vibhushan awardee, Pandit Jasraj. She is also the niece of 90s most successful music director duo Jatin-Lalit. Shraddha grew up in Mumbai and belongs to a large family of successful musicians, singers, music producers and actors. She learnt Hindustani Classical Music from her Grandfather, Sangeet Acharya Late Shri. Pandit Pratap Narayan.

She debuted in the world of playback singing at only age 11. Shraddha began her singing career at age 11 as a child vocalist for Anjali (1990 film), a movie which won a National Award for Best Film Music by Illayraja.

== Career ==
Shraddha has sung for many prolific music composers including A. R. Rahman, Amit Trivedi, Salim–Sulaiman, Badshah and many more. Her all-time hits are "Pehli Pehli Baar Baliye", "Ae Shivani", "Rang Deeni", "Sasural Genda Phool", "Jigar Da Tukda", "Manchandre Nu", "Khuda Ke Liye", "Bipasha", "Aiyoji", "Rab Rakha" and "Band Baaja Baaraat". Her latest chartbusters are "Pani Wala Dance" (2015) and "Aaj Raat Ka Scene" (2016). Shraddha has also released an album, Teri Heer from Sony Music in 2008, where she wrote lyrics and composed all the songs by herself.

In 2023, Shraddha was conferred an Honorary Doctorate for her contribution in the field of music. This was conferred by the Mansarovar Global University at Kushabhau Thakre Memorial Auditorian, Bhopal. She received the honor from the Governor of Madhya Pradesh, Shri Mangubhai Patel.

Shraddha Pandit wrote the lyrics to the hit song "Chhaila," which is the first song to bring both Sunidhi Chauhan and Shreya Ghoshal together on one track. Music was composed and produced by Salim–Sulaiman. As of 12 November 2024 the video had been seen over 7.5 million times since its release on 14 October 2024. On 19 December 2024, the video crossed 10 million views. Shraddha also penned the lyrics for "Jaan Le Gayi," which was the last track of Salim-Sulaiman's Bhoomi 2024 series. This song featured Vishal Dadlani and Sonu Nigam doing a collaboration.

On 28 November 2024, Shraddha received the Indian Music Award (initiated by Hungama) for Best Lyricist Jury Award for Manzoor Hai from Bhoomi 23.

== Filmography as Playback Singer ==
- Khamoshi: The Musical (1996)
- Sangharsh (1999)
- Khoobsurat (1999)
- Raju Chacha (2000)
- Jis Desh Mein Ganga Rehta Hain (2000)
- Shararat (2002 film) (2002)
- Kehtaa Hai Dil Baar Baar (2002)
- Dev (2004)
- Deewaar (2004)
- Fareb (2005)
- Black & White (2008) - "Peer Manava"
- Delhi-6 (2009)
- Band Baaja Baaraat (2010)
- Love Breakups Zindagi (2011)
- Aazaan (2011)
- Mummy Punjabi (2011) - Mujhko Tu Pyaar Kara De
- Ladies vs Ricky Bahl (2011)
- Jodi Breakers (2012)
- Denikaina Ready (2012)
- Heroine – "Tujh Pe Fida"
- Satyagraha – Democracy Under Fire (2013)
- Love Exchange (film)
- Action Jackson (2014) - "AJ Theme"
- Kuch Kuch Locha Hai – "Pani Wala Dance" (2015)
- Jazbaa — "Aaj Raat Ka Scene" Ft. Badshah (2015)
- Bareilly Ki Barfi - "Sweety Tera Drama" (with Dev Negi, Pawni Pandey) (2017)
- Junooniyatt (TV Show) (with Salim Merchant, Vivek Hariharan) - "Junooniyatt Title Track" (2023)
