= Mohit Chauhan =

Indian playback singer (born 1966)

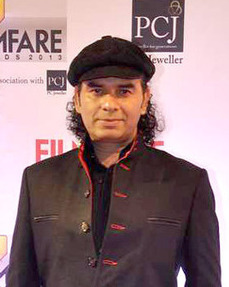
- Mohit Chauhan at the 59th Idea Filmfare Awards

Background information
- Born: 11 March 1966 (age 60); Nahan, Himachal Pradesh, India
- Genres: Pop; Rock; Himachali folk; Indi-pop
- Occupations: Singer; lyricist; composer; philanthropist
- Instruments: Harmonica, Guitar, Flute
- Years active: 1998–Present

Mohit Chauhan (born 11 March 1966) is an Indian playback singer, known for his work in Hindi films. He was a part of the Silk Route band. Chauhan has received two Filmfare Award for Best Male Playback Singer a Maharashtra State Film Award for Best Male Playback Singer and three Zee Cine Award For Best Male Playback Singer awards. He has recorded several songs for films and albums many different languages, and is one of the most prominent Indipop singers.

== Early life ==
Mohit Chauhan was born in the town of Nahan, Sirmaur district, Himachal Pradesh, on 11 March 1966. He has an elder brother and a younger sister. Because of his father's transferable job, he studied in various schools of Himachal Pradesh, including Our Lady of Snows Highschool in Kullu, and St. Luke's Senior Secondary School, Solan. Chauhan earned a Master of Science in Geology from a government college at Dharamshala affiliated to Himachal Pradesh University. He has not received any formal training in music, but he often practiced singing with his brother. He got influenced by his grandfather who was a classical singer and played harmonium. He was also influenced by legendary singer Kishore Kumar. He wanted to become an actor before his debut in the music industry.

== Career ==
Chauhan, Kem Trivedi, Atul Mittal and Kenny Puri formed the band Silk Route. Chauhan was the vocalist, while Kem played the keyboards, Atul Mittal was the lead guitarist and Kenny Puri played the drums. Their first album, Boondein, was released in 1998 and featured the popular songs "Dooba Dooba" and "Pehchan". The second album was released in 2000. After Silk Route was discontinued in 2008, he released another album Fitoor in 2009.

Chauhan's film singing career began in 2002 when he sung "Pehli Nazar Mein Dari Thi" from the film Road. His songs "Khoon Chala" from Rang De Basanti and "Tum Se Hi" from Jab We Met are regarded as his most notable. He won the Filmfare Award for Best Male Playback Singer prize in 2010 for the song Masakali.

In 2011, he was featured in the third episode of The Dewarists for his song "Maaya". He was also featured on MTV Unplugged in the same year. In 2017, he made his Gujarati language debut with the song "Jaag Re Banda" from the movie Last Chance. He sang for the first Himachali movie "Puchhe Amma" and "Deva Mere" from the film Saanjh.

=== Bollywood Debut: 2002-07 ===
After the massive success of "Dooba of Dooba" and "Boondein", which earned him awards and recognition, Chauhan was approached by composer Sandesh Shandilya to sing in films. Chauhan made his debut with Shandilya's composition of the song "Pehli Nazar Me Dari Thi" from the 2002 film Road. The next year, he sang for the films Main Madhuri Dixit Banana Chahati Hoon and Kyun, but didn't get any recognition.

This was followed by "Sabse Peeche Hum Khade" for the 2004 film Let's Enjoy, "Paintra" and "Guncha Koi" for the 2005 film Main Meri Patni aur Woh in which he also served as composer, and the song "Angna" and "Rowan Akhiya" for the film Adharma. A.R. Rahman, who had noticed Chauhan at the award win for Silk Route, called him to sing "Khoon Chala" for the film Rang De Basanti. The song proved to be a breakthrough for him, and in 2007, he followed this up with his first major hit song in the Pritam-composed romantic ballad "Tum Se Hi" for the film Jab We Met, penned by Irshad Kamil; both Pritam and writer-director Imtiaz Ali wanted Chauhan to lend his voice for this romantic track.

=== 2008-10 ===
Chauhan followed the success of "Tum Se Hi" with the song "Kuchh Khaas Hai" in 2008, composed by Salim–Sulaiman, for Fashion. He reunited with Pritam for Kismat Konnection where he performed "Kahi na Lage Man (Is This Love)" along with Shreya Ghoshal. "Ankhon Hi Ankhon Mein", a soft romantic number from EMI, had him appear on screen for the first time in the song's music video. He also sang for his first animated film Bolt where he sang the Hindi version of "I Thought I Lost You".

2009 was the most successful year in Chauhan's career, as of the 8 songs he recorded, 4 of them — "Masakali" from Delhi-6, "Yeh Dooriyan" from Love Aaj Kal, "Pehli Baar Mohabbat" from Kaminey and "Tune Jo Na Kaha" from New York — were huge chartbusters, establishing him as an audience favourite among the younger generation. 2010 proved to be a moderately successful follow-up to Chauhan's success from the previous year, as his songs became popular. Among his 2010 songs, the romantic number "Pee Loon" from Once Upon A Time In Mumbaai, picturized on Emraan Hashmi, was a rage.

=== 2011 ===
Chauhan had his biggest rise to national prominence in 2011 as he attracted mainstream attention for his contribution to the soundtrack of Rockstar, which reunited him with Ali and Rahman after almost half-a-decade; the 9 songs he recorded for the film as the voice of the protagonist Jordan played by Ranbir Kapoor were all massive chartbusters at the time of release, and continue to be treated as cult songs till date. Among other successful songs he recorded that year, "Abhi Kuch Dino Se" from Dil Toh Baccha Hai Ji and "Khwabon Ke Parinday" from Zindagi Na Milegi Dobara, "Acha Lagta Hai" from Aarakshan were highly popular.

=== 2015-Present ===
In 2020, Chauhan sang "Dheere Dheere Se" for the film Guns of Banaras, composed by Sohail Sen and written by Sameer. He sang "Yeh Dooriyaa" which is composed by Pritam from the film Love Aaj Kal (2020). This song is a new version of the chartbuster "Yeh Dooriyaan" from the film Love Aaj Kal (2009). Both versions are written by Irshad Kamil. There is a remix version too which was released by Sony Music India. He sang "Meethi Meethi Gallan", "Kisi Gair Ka Nahi", and "Salaam". Salaam is a tribute to corona warriors by Chauhan. He also features in a video of "Hum Haar Nahi Maanenge" composed by A. R. Rahman.

In 2019 Chauhan performed at Kargil Vijay Diwas, he sung "Khoon Chala" his song from Rang De Basanti, as a tribute to the brave Indian Soldiers. Prime Minister Narendra Modi and Defence Minister Rajnath Singh were present. The event was held at Indira Gandhi Indoor Stadium in New Delhi.

== Personal life and philanthropy ==
Chauhan married Prarthna Gehlot on 29 June 2012.

Mohit is an active participant in the not-for-profit public limited companies National Skill Development Corporation (NSDC), which encourages young people to follow beneficial vocational training initiatives.

Chauhan regularly feeds 250+ stray dogs in Delhi which started at the time of Lockdown in India due to COVID-19 pandemic. "Before the Lockdown, there were people who would feed the strays. But now, they've stopped. The stray dogs in Delhi don't hunt and depend on humans to feed them. So, I've been going around giving them food and water", says Chauhan. These efforts evolved into his own charity by the name of Animals Are People Too, registered under 80G & 12A.

== Filmography ==
| Year | Name | Role | Notes | Ref |
|---|---|---|---|---|
| 2008 | Ankhon Hi Ankhon Mein | Himself | Appearance in a song titled "Ankhon Hi Ankhon Mein" from film EMI | |
| 2009 | Kuchh ish Tarah | Himself | Appeared with Tulsi Kumar in the song Kuchh Is Tarah from film 8X10 Tasveer | |
| 2016 | Bolo Har Har | Himself | Appeared in song Bolo Har Har from movie Shivaay, it also features Mithoon, Badshah, Sukhwinder Singh, Megha Sriram and The Vamps | |
| 2012 | Main Hoon Shab | Himself | Appeared in the song Main Hoo Shab from film Tezz | |
| 2019 | Kyun Dil Mera | Himself | Appeared in the song "Kyun Dil Mera" from film Paharganj | |
| 2024 | Baaja | Himself | Appeared in the song "Baaja" from the film Amar Singh Chamkila | |
| 2025 | Chikri Chikri | Himself | Appeared in the song "Chikri Chikri" from the film Peddi | |

== Awards and honours ==
Chauhan has received two Filmfare Awards, one IIFA Award, three Zee Cine Awards, and one Screen Award. He was listed in the Forbes Celebrity 100 of 2012.
