= Connections (album) =

Album produced by A. R. Rahman

Studio album by A. R. Rahman
- Released: October 2008
- Recorded: 2008
- Genres: World music, Indian pop
- Labels: K.M. Musiq Ltd. under exclusive License to Universal Music for Retail Edition & Sony Music for Collector's Edition (2011)
- Producer: A. R. Rahman

A. R. Rahman chronology
Connections	Connections	Gems

Connections is a compilation album and a studio album produced by A. R. Rahman. It was published by his label K.M. Musiq Ltd. under License to different record labels for different editions. Retail Edition Pack contains his handpicked favourites from various films that He worked and was released by Universal Music Group and the Collector's edition, a 2-disc edition, contains all his original compositions in Disc 1 which were composed during various stages of his life. And Disc 2 contains various instrumentals and scores from his movies. It was released by Sony Music. Track Jiya se Jiya (Original Version) featuring Karthik and Raqueeb Alam is available only on Nokia Edition released on Nokia Xpress Music devices and Ovi Music. Jiya se Jiya (Rockstar Version) and Jiya se Jiya (Club Mix) were released on Retail Edition by Universal Music Group. Track 'Mosquito' on Nokia Edition and 'Macchar Khan' on Collector's Edition are the same tracks performed by Sabir Khan.

== Development ==
A. R. Rahman stated that it was developed at various stages of his life. The album has songs of various film such as Rang De Basanti, Dil Se.. and Ada... A Way of Life. It also has Rahman's first English-language release "Pray for Me Brother" and his immensely popular and cult classic "Bombay Theme".

== Release ==
In October 2008, Nokia Edition of this album was released as an exclusive gift along with Xpressmusic 5800 in India.

The retail album was released on Universal Music on 27 June 2009, it is also available in a Deluxe Edition pack that features the "Rockstar Version" video of "Jiya Se Jiya". For the first time ever Rahman appears in a zingy new avatar grooving alongside ace-percussionist Sivamani. The Retail Edition was reissued by Wrasse Records, a Label that Licenses Universal Music's World Music Albums in the United States and the UK. The Reissued Version contains additional 3 tracks, 'Jai Ho' from Slumdog Millionaire, 'Jai Ho! (You are my Destiny)' and 'Sajna' from Couples Retreat.

In 2011, another 2 CD version was released. It included all 8 Nokia Edition tracks along with a compilation CD of 10 A.R.Rahman hits.

== Track listing (Nokia Edition, 2008) ==
#	Song	Singer(s)	Notes & Lyrics
01	"Jiya Se Jiya (Original Version)"	Karthik, A. R. Rahman & Raqueeb Alam	Lyrics: Raqueeb Alam (Released only on Nokia Xpress Devices and Nokia Ovi music)
02	"Mann Chandre"	Sukhwinder Singh, Shraddha Pandit	Lyrics: Sukhwinder Singh Additional Vocals: Vijay Prakash & Dilshad
03	"Kural"	BlaaZe, Gomthi	Thiruvalluvar & Blaaze
04	"Silent Invocation A"		Naveen Kumar (Flutist)
05	"Silent Invocation B"		Naveen Kumar (Flutist)
06	"Silent Invocation C"		Naveen Kumar (Flutist)
07	"Mylapore Blues"	A. R. Rahman	Additional Keyboards: Jim Satya
08	"Himalaya"		Michael Mc Cleary (Additional Arrangements and Keyboards)
09	"Mosquito"		Sabir Khan (Sarangi)

== Track listing (Retail Edition, 2009) ==
#	Song	Singer(s)	Notes
01	"Jiya Se Jiya (Rockstar Version)"	Karthik, A. R. Rahman, Raqueeb Aalam	A. R. Rahman on vocals featuring percussionist Sivamani and Drum Café (Mustafa Kutoane & Mpho Masinga)
02	"Jai Ho"	Sukhvinder Singh, Tanvi Shah, Mahalaxmi Iyer and Vijay Prakash	From Slumdog Millionaire OST
03	"Khalbali"	A. R. Rahman, Aslam, Nacim	From Rang De Basanti OST
04	"Meherbaan"	A. R. Rahman	From Ada... A Way of Life OST
05	"Dil Se Re"	A. R. Rahman	From Dil Se.. OST
06	"Ek Mohabbat"	A. R. Rahman, Karthik, Naresh Iyer	From the album One Love
07	"Sajna"	P. J. Morton	From Couples Retreat OST
08	"Bombay Theme"	A. R. Rahman	From Bombay OST
09	"Pray for Me Brother"	A. R. Rahman feat Blazee	Sung and composed by Rahman in aid of the United Nations Eradication of Poverty by 2015 programme.
10	"Jiya Se Jiya (Club mix)"	A. R. Rahman remixed by DJ A-MYTH	
11	"Jai Ho! (You Are My Destiny)"	A. R. Rahman, The Pussycat Dolls	From Doll Domination
12	"Pray For Me Brother (Instrumental)"	A. R. Rahman	Instrumental version of the original song

== Track listing (Collector's Edition, 2011) ==
CD_#	Song	Singer(s)	Notes/Original Album
101	"Silent Invocation 1"		Naveen Kumar (Flutist)
102	"Silent Invocation 2"		Naveen Kumar (Flutist)
103	"Silent Invocation 3"		Naveen Kumar (Flutist)
104	"Mylapore Blues"	A. R. Rahman	Jim Satya (Additional Keyboards)
105	"Himalaya"		Michael Mc Cleary (Additional Arrangements and Keyboards)
106	"Mosquito (Macchar Khan)"		Sabir Khan (Sarangi)
107	"Kural"	BlaaZe, Gomthi	
108	"Mann Chandra"	Sukhwinder Singh, Shraddha Pandit	Lyrics: Sukhwinder Singh Additional Vocals: Vijay Prakash & Dilshad
201	"Jashn-E-Baharaa - Flute"	Naveen Kumar (Flutist)	Jodhaa Akbar
202	"Jessie's Land "	Megha & A. R. Rahman	Vinnaithaandi Varuvaayaa
203	"Missing"	A. R. Rahman, Anuradha Sriram, Sujatha Mohan, Kalyani & Seema	Vande Mataram
204	"Khwaja Mere Khwaja - Oboe"	Leigh Ann Woodard & A. R. Rahman	Jodhaa Akbar
205	"Cyclist's Rhythm"	Sivamani, Naveen Kumar & A. R. Rahman	Meenaxi
206	"Restless Mystic"	A. R. Rahman, Seenu	Raavanan
207	"Lagaan.. Once Upon A Time In India"	Anuradha Sriram & A. R. Rahman	Lagaan
208	"The Lament Of The Leaves"	Bruno Conn & A. R. Rahman	Raavanan
209	"Potter's Village"	Hossam Ramzy, John Themis, A. R. Rahman	Meenaxi
210	"Yaaro Evalo"	Chinna Ponnu, Sangeetha & A. R. Rahman	Raavanan

== Composer Note ==
"Connections is a very special compilation of songs done at various stages of my life. They all mean a lot to me and I hope the album will be enjoyed by all."
