= Pray for Me Brother =

Single by A. R. Rahman featuring Blaaze
- Released: 1 January 2007
- Recorded: 2007
- Studio: Panchathan Record Inn, AM Studios (Chennai, India)
- Genre: Pop
- Length: 5:07 (original version); 4:40 (instrumental version)
- Label: Universal Music Group
- Songwriters: A. R. Rahman, Blaaze
- Producers: A. R. Rahman, Mikey McCleary

A. R. Rahman singles chronology
"We Can Make It Better" (2005)	"Pray for Me Brother" (2007)	"One Love" (2007)

Licensed audio
- "Pray For Me Brother" on YouTube

"Pray for Me Brother" is a single by Indian composer A. R. Rahman. Released in 2007, being one of the earliest vertical music videos, the song was conceived as an anti-poverty anthem for the Millennium Goals for the United Nations. It is part of a joint venture between the A. R. Rahman Foundation and Nokia.

The song had lyrics by A. R. Rahman and Blaaze with additional lyrics by Sukhwinder Singh. The main vocalist was Rahman himself, while Blaaze accompanied him by providing backing vocals. Clinton Cerejo, Dominique Cerejo, Vivienne Pocha and Hrishikesh Kamerkar have also provided backing vocals.

The video of the album was directed and conceived by Bharatbala of BharatBala Productions, who is a usual associate for Rahman's album videos. It has been shoot by the ace cinematographer Tassaduq Hussain Mufti.

== Background ==
In 1998, after averting a major crisis in the Middle East through diplomatic means, UN Secretary-General Kofi Annan had spoken the following words, "Never underestimate the power of prayer". In his eyes, it was prayer that finally gave any material means the agency to make the world a better place.

The A. R. Rahman Foundation represents a movement to eradicate poverty through facilitation of education to poor and needy children. As part of the initiative, it has joined with several institutes across the globe. Pray For Me Brother is an initiative by the A.R. Rahman Foundation, with Nokia Corporation to collect funds for the U.N. Millennium Development Programme aimed at eradicating poverty by the year 2015. It is a song about the emotion that lies at the heart of prayer – the emotion of love. It reinstills our faith in love’s power to heal and reminds us that there are those in this world who need of our gestures of healing and comfort. The song was made available for a free download at the official website of U.N. Millennium Goals.

Speaking on the occasion of the audio launch, Rahman said, One thing is common about hunger-everybody feels it. This song is a statement from India to the world. Otherwise we listen and the world talks. I have seen beggars everywhere. This song is not a remedy but an inspiration to do something. World Health Organization official Sathya suggested I should come up with a song for the tuberculosis cause for which U.N. had appointed me as their Brand Ambassador. As I was doing this, I noticed the poverty around that we seem to have become immune to. I called my friend Blaaze and asked if we could do something, hence the song was born, he added.

The film is set primarily in Los Angeles, USA, where progress and plenitude abound. Lives and lifestyles there stand in stark contrast to those parts of the world where pain and suffering abound. The film attempts to bring these two worlds together through its story and in doing so depicts the dawning of a particular realization on its protagonist – that he need not wait for a reason to show kindness, that now was the time for him to offer a healing prayer to his brothers and sisters in need across the world.

== Music video ==
The film was conceived and directed by Bharatbala in the banner of BharatBala Productions. The song was picturised in Los Angeles, USA, with cinematography by Tassaduq Hussain Mufti. The choreography was done by Cassel Dixion Jr, Talent Bryan Clark and Adele Jones. The music video was the first to be shot on mobile cinemascope format.

== Track listing ==
The official track listing.

=== Disc one ===
No.	Title	Artist(s)	Length
1.	"Pray for Me Brother"	A. R. Rahman featuring Blaaze	5:07
2.	"Pray for Me Brother - Instrumental Version"	A. R. Rahman	4:40

=== Disc two (limited edition DVD) ===
1. Pray for Me Brother - Original unedited full length video film in 4:3 aspect ratio.
2. Making of the video Feat. A. R. Rahman, Blaaze, Bharatbala

== Album credits ==
=== Personnel ===
- A. R. Rahman – vocals
- Blaaze - vocals
- Srinivas – Sarod
- Mikey McCleary – guitar
- Christy Samuels - guitar
- Carry Hernley – Saxophone
- Leigh Ann Woodard – Oboe
- Seetha Sivaswamy - Flute

=== Production ===
- Producers: A. R. Rahman, Mikey McCleary
- Executive Producer: Mohan Chopra
- Engineers: H. Sridhar, Aditya Modi, S. Sivakumar, P. Deepak
- Mixing: Mikey McCleary
- Mastering: Mikey McCleary

=== Design ===
- Artwork : Epigram
- Photography: Akin
