= 5th Screen Awards =

Awards for Hindi-language films of 1998

- Date: 16 January 1999
- Site: Andheri Sports Complex, Mumbai
- Hosted by: Renuka Shahane; Cyrus Broacha; Tara Deshpande

Highlights
- Best Picture: Kuch Kuch Hota Hai
- Best Direction: Karan Johar (Kuch Kuch Hota Hai)
- Best Actor: Ajay Devgn (Zakhm)
- Best Actress: Kajol (Dushman)
- Most awards: Zakhm (5)
- Most nominations: Ghulam and Kuch Kuch Hota Hai (16)

Television coverage
- Network: DD National

The 5th Screen Awards also The fifth Annual Screen–Videocon Awards ceremony, presented by Indian Express Group, honoured the best Indian Hindi-language films of 1998. The ceremony was held on 16 January 1999 at Andheri Sports Complex, Mumbai, hosted by Renuka Shahane, Cyrus Broacha and Tara Deshpande.

Both Ghulam and Kuch Kuch Hota Hai led the ceremony with 16 nominations, followed by Satya with 13 nominations and Zakhm with 12 nominations.

Zakhm won 5 awards including Best Actor thus becoming the most-awarded film at the ceremony.

== Awards ==
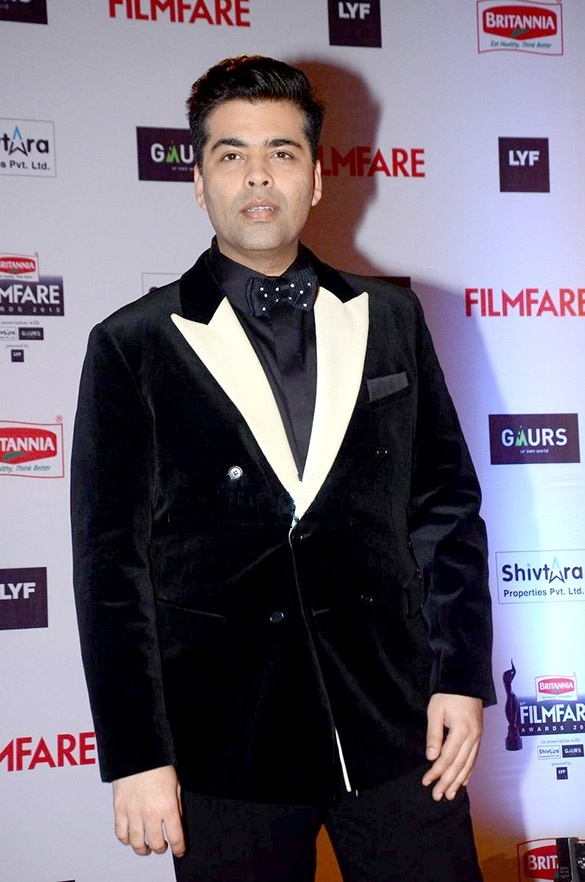
Karan Johar — Best Director for Kuch Kuch Hota Hai

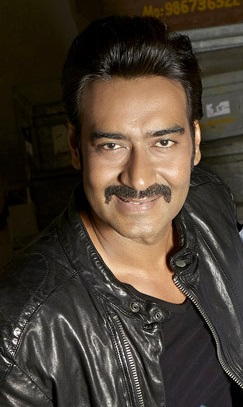
Ajay Devgn — Best Actor for Zakhm

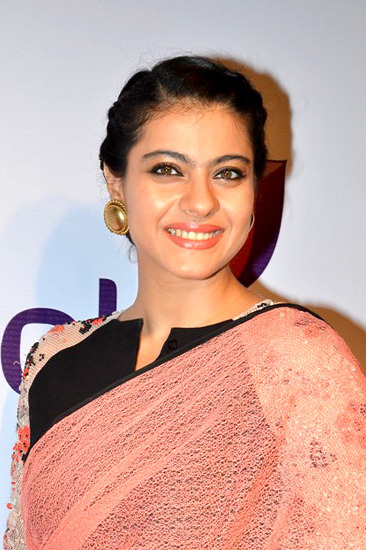
Kajol — Best Actress for Dushman

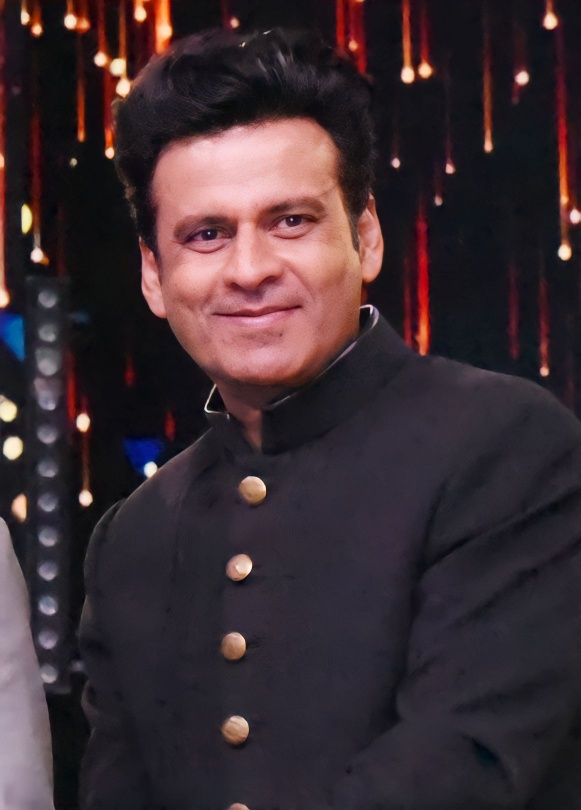
Manoj Bajpayee — Best Supporting Actor for Satya

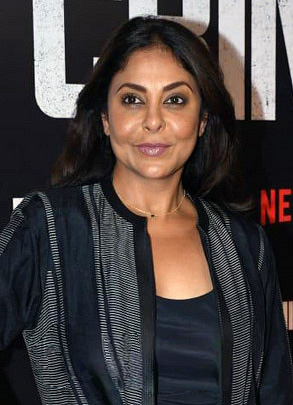
Shefali Shah — Best Supporting Actress for Satya

The winners and nominees have been listed below. Winners are listed first, highlighted in boldface, and indicated with a double dagger (‡).

=== Jury Awards ===
Best Film	Best Director
**Kuch Kuch Hota Hai** ‡; Ghulam; Pyaar To Hona Hi Tha; Satya; Zakhm	**Karan Johar – Kuch Kuch Hota Hai** ‡; Abbas-Mustan – Soldier; Mahesh Bhatt – Zakhm; Ram Gopal Varma – Satya; Vikram Bhatt – Ghulam
Best Actor	Best Actress
**Ajay Devgn – Zakhm** ‡; Aamir Khan – Ghulam; Ajay Devgn – Pyaar To Hona Hi Tha; Govinda – Bade Miyan Chote Miyan; Shah Rukh Khan – Kuch Kuch Hota Hai	**Kajol – Dushman** ‡; Kajol – Kuch Kuch Hota Hai; Manisha Koirala – Dil Se..; Pooja Bhatt – Zakhm; Rani Mukerji – Ghulam
Best Supporting Actor	Best Supporting Actress
**Manoj Bajpayee – Satya** ‡; Akkineni Nagarjuna – Zakhm; Naseeruddin Shah – China Gate; Rajit Kapur – Ghulam; Sharat Saxena – Ghulam	**Shefali Shah – Satya** ‡; Amardeep Jha – Zakhm; Preity Zinta – Dil Se..; Rani Mukerji – Kuch Kuch Hota Hai; Seema Biswas – Hazaar Chaurasi Ki Maa
Most Promising Newcomer – Female	Best Child Artist
**Preity Zinta – Soldier** ‡; Shabana Raza – Kareeb; Shefali Shah – Satya	**Kunal Khemu** – **Zakhm** ‡
Best Actor in a Negative Role	Best Comedian
**Ashutosh Rana** – **Dushman** ‡; Amardeep Jha – Zakhm; Mohan Joshi – Major Saab; Mukesh Tiwari – China Gate; Sharat Saxena – Ghulam	**Archana Puran Singh** – **Kuch Kuch Hota Hai** ‡
Best Music Director	Best Lyricist
**Jatin-Lalit – Kuch Kuch Hota Hai** ‡; A.R. Rahman – Dil Se..; Anu Malik – Soldier; Jatin–Lalit – Ghulam; Jatin-Lalit – Pyaar To Hona Hi Tha	**Anand Bakshi – "Gali Mein Aaj Chand Nikla" – Zakhm** ‡; Javed Akhtar – "Mere Mehboob Mere Sanam" – Duplicate; Rahat Indori – "Chori Chori Jab Nazrein Mili" – Kareeb; Sameer – "Kuch Kuch Hota Hai" – Kuch Kuch Hota Hai; Sameer – "Pyaar To Hona Hi Tha" – Pyaar To Hona Hi Tha
Best Male Playback Singer	Best Female Playback Singer
**Sukhwinder Singh – "Chaiyya Chaiyya" – Dil Se..** ‡; Aamir Khan – "Aati Kya Khandala" – Ghulam; Kumar Sanu – "Chori Chori Jab Nazrein Mili" – Kareeb; Remo Fernandes – "Pyaar To Hona Hi Tha" – Pyaar To Hona Hi Tha; Udit Narayan – "Kuch Kuch Hota Hai" – Kuch Kuch Hota Hai	**Jaspinder Narula – "Pyaar To Hona Hi Tha" – Pyaar To Hona Hi Tha** ‡; Alka Yagnik – "Gali Mein Aaj Chand Nikla" – Zakhm; Alka Yagnik – "Kuch Kuch Hota Hai" – Kuch Kuch Hota Hai; Kavita Krishnamurthy – "Mujh Pe Bhi Jawani" – Saat Rang Ke Sapne; Sanjeevani – "Churalo Na Dil Mera" – Kareeb

=== Technical Awards ===
Best Story	Best Screenplay
**Mahesh Bhatt** – **Zakhm** ‡; Anees Bazmee – Pyaar To Hona Hi Tha; Anjum Rajabali – Ghulam; Anurag Kashyap, Saurabh Shukla – Satya; Karan Johar – Kuch Kuch Hota Hai	**Anurag Kashyap, Saurabh Shukla – Satya** ‡; Anees Bazmee – Pyaar To Hona Hi Tha; Anjum Rajabali – Ghulam; Karan Johar – Kuch Kuch Hota Hai; Mahesh Bhatt, Tanuja Chandra – Zakhm
Best Dialogue	Best Cinematography
**Girish Dhamija** – **Zakhm** ‡; Anurag Kashyap, Saurabh Shukla – Satya; Hriday Lani – Yugpurush; Javed Siddiqui – Soldier; Karan Johar – Kuch Kuch Hota Hai	**Binod Pradhan** – **Kareeb** ‡; Govind Nihalani – Hazaar Chaurasi Ki Maa; Piyush Shah – China Gate; Santosh Sivan – Dil Se..; Thomas Xavier – Soldier
Best Editing	Best Art Direction
**Hussain A. Burmawala** – **Soldier** ‡; Apurva Asrani – Satya; Sanjay Sankla – Kuch Kuch Hota Hai; Suresh Chaturvedi – Pyaar To Hona Hi Tha; Waman Bhonsle – Ghulam	**Sharmishta Roy** – **Jab Pyaar Kisise Hota Hai** ‡; Nitin Desai – Pyaar To Hona Hi Tha; Nitin Desai – Vinashak; Samir Chanda – China Gate; Sharmishta Roy – Kuch Kuch Hota Hai
Best Choreography	Best Action
**Ganesh Acharya – "Chamma Chamma" – China Gate** ‡; Farah Khan – "Chaiyya Chaiyya" – Dil Se..; Farah Khan – "Kuch Kuch Hota Hai" – Kuch Kuch Hota Hai; Ganesh Acharya – "Tera Rang Balle Balle" – Soldier; Lollypop Pradhan – "Aati Kya Khandala" – Ghulam	**Akbar Bakshi** – **Soldier** ‡; Abbas Ali Moghul, Haniif Sheikh – Ghulam; Allan Amin – Satya; Tinu Verma – China Gate; Tinu Verma – Salaakhen
Best Debut Technician	Best Sound
**Tanuja Chandra** – **Dushman (director)** ‡; Anurag Kashyap, Saurabh Shukla – Satya (screenplay); Karan Johar – Kuch Kuch Hota Hai (director)	**Rakesh Ranjan** – **Pyaar To Hona Hi Tha** ‡; H. Sridhar – China Gate; Jarvis Solomon – Dil Se..; Sona Chaudhary – Satya; Uday Inamati – Ghulam

=== Television Awards ===
Best General Entertainment Show	Best Drama Series
**Sa Re Ga Ma Pa Hindi** ‡; Amul India Show; Antakshiri; Boogie Woogie; Kehne Mein Kya Harj Hai	**Saans** ‡; Aashirwad; Amanat; Just Mohabbat; Mahayagya
Best TV Performance - Male	Best TV Performance - Female
**Govind Namdev** – **Mahayagya** ‡; Alok Nath – Thoda Hai Thode Ki Zaroorat Hai; Irrfan Khan – Adhikar; Kanwaljit Singh – Saans; Sachin Khedekar – Adhikar	**Neena Gupta** – **Saans** ‡; Prajakti Deshmukh - Thoda Hai Bas Thode Ki Zaroorat Hai; Rohini Hattangadi – Mahayagya; Shefali Shah – Hasratein
Best Thriller Series	Best Investigative Program
**Aahat** ‡; X Zone	**Bhanwar** ‡; **India's Most Wanted** ‡
Best TV Anchor	Best News Program
**Archana Puran Singh** – **Uncensored** ‡; Javed Jaffrey – Flashback; Ruby Bhatia – Ooh La La; Sajid Khan – Kehne Mein Kya Harj Hai	**NDTV** ‡

=== Special awards ===
Lifetime Achievement Award
- **Sunil Dutt**
Special Jury Award
- **Asha Bhosle**
Best Publicity Design
- **Hazaar Chaurasi Ki Maa**

== Superlatives ==
Multiple nominations
Nominations	Film
16	Ghulam
16	Kuch Kuch Hota Hai
13	Satya
12	Zakhm
11	Pyaar To Hona Hi Tha
8	Soldier
7	China Gate
7	Dil Se..
5	Kareeb
3	Dushman
2	Hazaar Chaurasi Ki Maa

Multiple wins
Awards	Film
5	Zakhm
4	Kuch Kuch Hota Hai
3	Dushman
3	Satya
3	Soldier
2	Pyaar To Hona Hi Tha

=== Television Superlatives ===
Multiple nominations
Nominations	Film
3	Mahayagya
3	Saans
2	Adhikar
2	Kehne Mein Kya Harj Hai
2	Thoda Hai Thode Ki Zaroorat Hai

Multiple wins
Awards	Film
2	Saans

== Presenters ==
Name	Role
Siddharth Kak	Presenter of the awards for Best General Entertainment Show, Best Drama Series, Best Thriller Series, Best Investigative Program, and Best in News Programming
Kiran Juneja; Amrish Puri	Presenters of the awards for Best Anchor on TV, Best Performance on TV (Male), Best Performance on TV (Female) R.N. Gupta accepted the Best Performance on TV (Female) award on behalf of Neena Gupta
Ila Arun; Ramesh Taurani	Presenters of the awards for Best Action and Best Choregraphy
Alok Nath; Poonam Dhillon	Presenters of the awards for Best Debut Technician and Special Award for Best Publicity Design
Govind Nihalani; Pooja Bhatt	Presenters of the awards for Best Editing and Best Sound
Ravi Chopra; Kirron Kher	Presenters of the awards for Best Lyricist and Best Dialogue
Bharat Shah; Tanuja	Presenters of the awards for Best Story and Best Screenplay Mukesh Bhatt accepted the Best Story award on behalf of Mahesh Bhatt
Ramesh Sippy; Rohini Hattangadi	Presenters of the award for Best Art Direction and Best Cinematography Binay Pradhan accepted the Best Cinematography award on behalf of Binod Pradhan
Viveck Goenka; Anirudh Dhoot; Bruce Davis	Presenters of the award for Lifetime Achievement Award
Yash Chopra; Preity Zinta	Presenters of the award for Best Music Director
Rajeshwari Sachdev; Ramesh Sippy	Presenters of the award for Best Female Playback
Anupam Kher	Presenter of the award for Best Male Playback
Smita Thackeray	Presenter of the award for Most Promising Newcomer - Female
Kulbhushan Gupta	Presenter of the award for Best Actor in a Negative Role
Dinesh Gandhi	Presenter of the award for Best Supporting Actor
Salman Khan; Arbaaz Khan	Presenters of the award for Best Supporting Actress
Ramesh Sippy	Presenter of the Special Jury Award to Asha Bhosle
Richard Edlund; Rani Mukerji	Presenters of the award for Best Director
Yash Chopra	Presenter of the award for Best Film
Shah Rukh Khan; Rekha	Presenters of the award for Best Actress
Madhuri Dixit; Anil Kapoor	Presenters of the award for Best Actor
