= Arshad Sauleh =

Indian painter (born 1971)

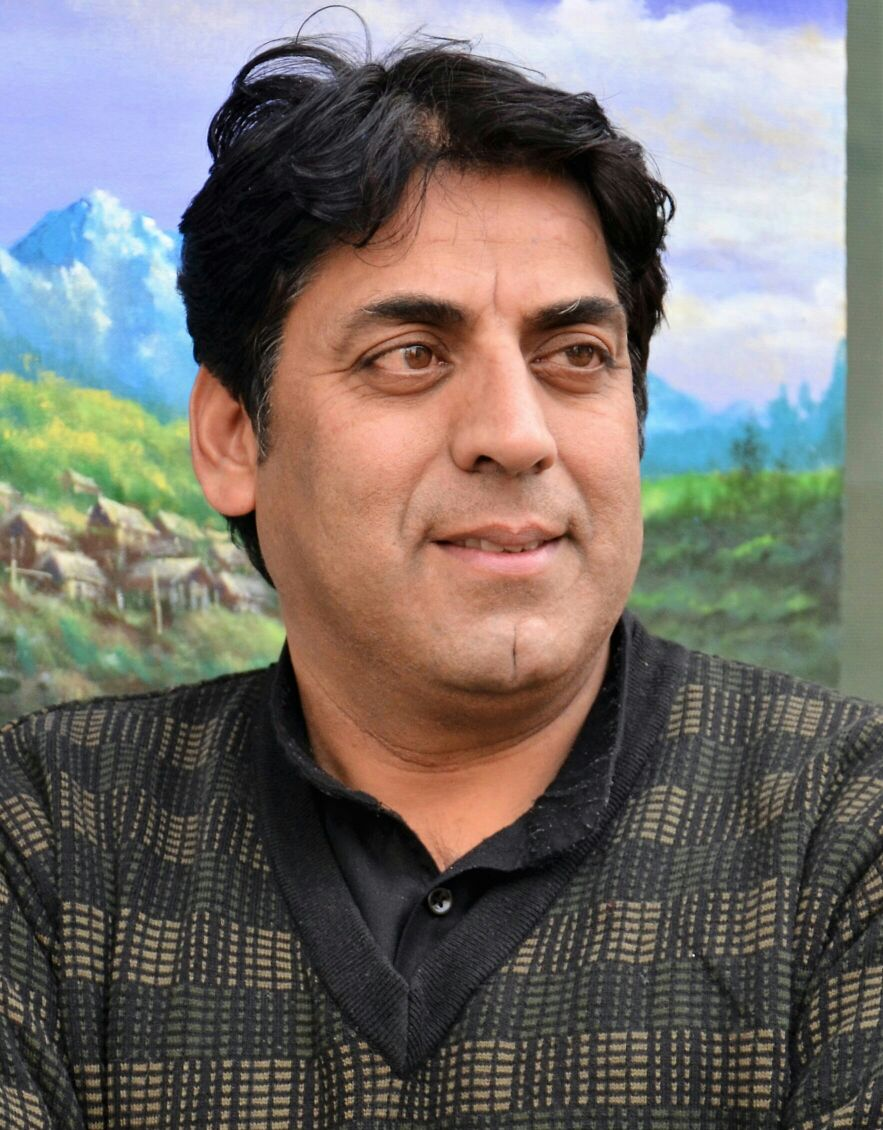
- Born: Arshad Hussain; 27 December 1971 (age 54); Srinagar, Old city
- Education: University of Kashmir
- Known for: Painting Calligraphy
- Awards: 2016 – Ram Mehar Malik National Award by Raskala Munch Safedun Rohtak Haryana

Arshad Sauleh (Urdu: ارشر صالح) is an artist and a radio broadcaster born in a Muslim family at Srinagar in the summer capital of Kashmir who has remained host/judge of several noted art exhibitions besides he is teaching art at Government College of Education in Srinagar.

== Contribution and awards ==
Arshid Sauleh represented India in the 2002 International Exhibition of Quranic paintings in Iran. He was honored by Ministry of Heritage and Islamic Guidance, Government of Iran to the tenth International Exhibition on Quranic Paintings. During Kashmir conflict

- 2011-Merit Award by State Academy of Art Culture and Language Srinagar.

== See also ==
- M F Husain
