= Owais Husain =

Indian multimedia artist

- Born: Mumbai, Maharashtra, India
- Education: Fine Arts
- Alma mater: Sir J. J. School of Art
- Father: M. F. Husain
- Relatives: Shamshad Hussain (brother)

Owais Husain (born 1967) is an Indian multimedia artist, painter and filmmaker.

== Biography ==
Owais Husain was born in Mumbai, India, in 1967. He is the son of M. F. Husain and Fazila. Husain graduated in Fine Arts from the Sir Jamsetjee Jeejebhoy School of Art in 1990. He lives and works in Dubai and Mumbai.

== Work ==
Husain is a multimedia artist whose work includes painting, poetry, watercolour, sculpture and installation art. His works have been shown in solo and group exhibitions.

He has also worked as a producer, director and writer in film and music.

His work explores themes such as identity, urban mythology and culture.

== Exhibitions ==
=== Solo exhibitions ===
- 2016 – House of Cards, Institute of Contemporary Arts Singapore
- 2015 – Heart of Silence, Capsule Arts, Dubai
- 2014 – My Body, A Fleet of Ships, W. Foundation, Seoul
- 2013 – Forest of Lost Languages, Burj Khalifa, Dubai
- 2010 – 3 Worlds, Tao Art Gallery, Mumbai
- 2006 – Forest of Lost Languages, Aicon Gallery, New York
- 2000 – New Works, Gallery 88, Kolkata
- 1998 – The Present is the Source of Presences, Vadehra Art Gallery, New Delhi
- 1997 – The Present is the Source of Presences, Sakshi Art Gallery, Mumbai
- 1995 – Recent Works, Sakshi Art Gallery, Mumbai
- 1994 – Paintings and Drawings, Vadehra Art Gallery, New Delhi
- 1992 – Cities and Sky, Ahmedabad
- 1989 – That Obscure Object of Desire, Triveni Gallery, New Delhi
- 1987 – Photographic installation, Festival of India, Moscow and St Petersburg
- 1986 – The Sea that Found a Tree, Sir J. J. School of Art, Mumbai

=== Group exhibitions ===
- 2016 – PUBLICA 2016, New Delhi
- 2011 – Contemporary Art, Dubai
- 2010 – Owais/Tassaduq, Karachi
- 2008 – Keep Drawing, New Delhi
- 2007 – Double Take, New Delhi; Indian Art III/III, London
- 2004 – Husain & Sons, New York
- 2003 – A Celebration of Colour, Mumbai
- 2001 – Century City, Tate Modern, London
- 2000 – Erotica, Mumbai
- 1999 – Kala Ghoda Festival, Mumbai
- 1998 – National Gallery of Modern Art, Mumbai
- 1997 – National Gallery of Modern Art, New Delhi

== Film and music ==
- 2012 – Writer and director, Pehla Sitara
- 2010 – Producer and director, Letters to My Son About My Father
- 2007 – Director, Ek Mohabbat
- 2004 – Writer and co-director, Meenaxi: A Tale of Three Cities
- 2000 – Associate director, Gaja Gamini
