= Rock On!! (soundtrack) =

Soundtrack album by Shankar–Ehsaan–Loy
- Released: 7 July 2008 (India)
- Genres: Film soundtrack, filmi, Indian rock
- Length: 37:58
- Label: Big Music
- Producers: Farhan Akhtar, Ritesh Sidhwani

Shankar–Ehsaan–Loy chronology
Thoda Pyaar Thoda Magic (2008)	Rock On!! (2008)	Konchem Istam Konchem Kastam (2008)

Rock On!! is the soundtrack to the 2008 musical film of the same name directed by Abhishek Kapoor, starring Arjun Rampal, Farhan Akhtar, Purab Kohli and Luke Kenny. The original score and songs were composed by Shankar–Ehsaan–Loy. The songs' lyrics were written by Javed Akhtar.

The album was released on 7 July 2008. by Big Music Despite a cold reception from the critics, the album became a cult favourite selling over 120,000 copies in India.

== Overview ==
The movie's songs were composed in five days. Since the movie is about a rock band, Shankar–Ehsaan–Loy composed the music in a similar fashion, with the drums and bass set-up and played live to the recorder without any programming. All songs were mixed by Vijay Benegal.

"Pichle Saat Dinon Mein", a song about how one loses everything but cannot afford to lose love, was the first song composed, jammed on the guitar riff that Ehsaan Noorani came up with completed in about 20 minutes. This was followed by "Socha Hai" and the title track "Rock On!!". These were sung by Farhan Akhtar in his first singing role. "Yeh Tumhari Meri Baatein" is sung by Dominique Cerejo in an ambient genre. "Zehreelay", performed by Suraj Jagan, is hardcore metal, which is often a rarity in mainstream Bollywood soundtracks.

The rock ballad "Tum Ho Toh" was sung by Farhan Akhtar. "Sinbad The Sailor" is the song that appears in the climax of the movie, which is along the lines of "Achilles Last Stand" and "Tales of Brave Ulysses". The song is performed by Farhan Akhtar and Raman Mahadevan. The serene "Phir Dekhiye" is performed by a long-time favorite of Shankar–Ehsaan–Loy, Caralisa Monteiro. The album also has a live version of "Pichle Saat Dinon Mein". Darshan Doshi, the drummer who also tours with the trio, Shankar–Ehsaan–Loy's band, played the drums in the soundtrack.

Bass guitar was played by freelance musician Ardeshir Mistry (Adi Mistry), (who played with Shankar Ehsaan Loy, Amit Trivedi etc..)

The lyrics of "Rock On!!" were written by Javed Akhtar in the style of a modern rock band's output.

== Release history ==
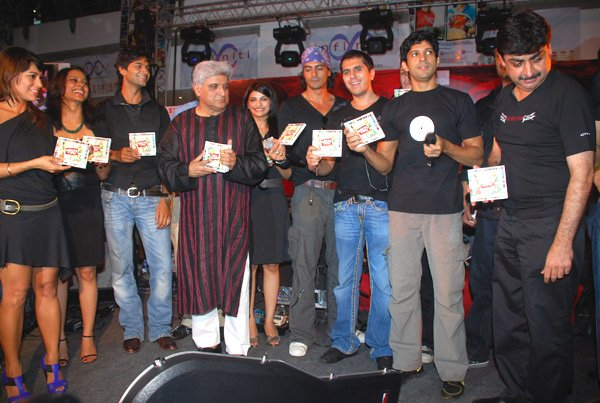
Rock On!! team at music launch

The music was released worldwide by Big Music on July 7, 2008, at Infinity Mall in Andheri, Mumbai. Shankar–Ehsaan–Loy and Farhan Akhtar performed live at the launch with rest of the cast.

== Track listing ==
Track #	Song	Singer(s)	Duration	Picturized on
1	"Socha Hai"	Farhan Akhtar	4:11	Arjun Rampal, Farhan Akhtar, Luke Kenny, Purab Kohli
2	"Pichle Saat Dinon Mein"	Farhan Akhtar	3:12	Arjun Rampal, Farhan Akhtar, Luke Kenny, Purab Kohli (Promotional Song)
3	"Rock On!!"	Farhan Akhtar	3:55	Arjun Rampal, Farhan Akhtar, Luke Kenny, Purab Kohli, Shahana Goswami, Nicolette Bird
4	"Yeh Tumhari Meri Baatein"	Dominique Cerejo	5:29	Arjun Rampal, Farhan Akhtar, Luke Kenny, Purab Kohli, Shahana Goswami, Prachi Desai
5	"Zehreelay"	Suraj Jagan	3:42	Suraj Jagan, Band
6	"Tum Ho Toh"	Farhan Akhtar	4:15	Arjun Rampal, Farhan Akhtar, Luke Kenny, Purab Kohli, Shahana Goswami
7	"Sinbad The Sailor"	Farhan Akhtar, Raman Mahadevan	6:32	Arjun Rampal, Farhan Akhtar, Luke Kenny, Purab Kohli, Shahana Goswami, Prachi Desai
8	"Pichle Saat Dinon Mein (Live Version)"	Farhan Akhtar	6:35	Arjun Rampal, Farhan Akhtar, Luke Kenny, Purab Kohli
9	"Phir Dekhiye"	Caralisa Monteiro	3:27	Arjun Rampal, Farhan Akhtar, Luke Kenny, Purab Kohli, Shahana Goswami, Prachi Desai, Koel Purie, Nicolette Bird, Suraj Jagan (Closing Credits)

== Reception ==
=== Initial reception ===
"Rock On!!"
A 29 second sample of "Rock On!!" featuring Farhan Akhtar

The music was not well received by the mainstream critics. Raja sen of Rediff was critical of the album calling it "a nothing album with pedestrian lyrics". Joginder Tuteja of Bollywood Hungama echoed these sentiments saying, "The soundtrack just doesn't work and is quite a shocker from SEL - Javed Akhtar team."

Though a few reviewers were impressed by the album. Planetbollywood's Atta Khan described the album as "bold and daring" and concluded, "The only thing that remains is for listeners to open their ears to a unique genre especially if they have been drummed with too much regular stuff from Pritam / Anu Malik and dare I say it Vishal and Shekhar…."

=== Sales and cult status ===
Despite the poor reviews, the album became a chart-topper selling over 120,000 copies in India. The sales of the soundtrack surged further once the film began to receive positive reviews from the film critics.

The album became popular amongst the urban masses and slowly started building a cult following. Shankar Mahadevan commented on the initial negative reviews saying, "Even in the past, we have faced such situations when some people have rejected our music in the first couple of hearing," including Dil Chahta Hai and Kal Ho Naa Ho which earned several awards and accolades, and are considered among the best Bollywood soundtracks of all time.

The Rock on! team appeared on the cover of the popular music magazine Rolling Stone's 2008 September issue. Farhan described it as a "dream come true" since, as a teenager, he had always dreamt of being in Rolling Stone.
