= Big Music (record label) =

- Parent company: Reliance Entertainment
- Founded: 2005; 20 years ago
- Founder: Anil Ambani
- Distributors: T-Series, Universal Pictures
- Genre: Bollywood
- Country of origin: India
- Location: Mumbai, India

Big Music (also known as Reliance Big Music) is an Indian record label owned by Anil Ambani. It is a part of Reliance Entertainment, a subsidiary of Reliance Anil Dhirubhai Ambani Group.

The label was started in 2005, along with several other subsidiaries of Reliance Big Entertainment. BIG Music is the exclusive licensee in India to Universal Pictures International, Warner Home Video, Paramount Home Entertainment Global & DreamWorks Animation. They had also launched an artist-management division called Big Talent in 2008, which is the second local label after Columbia Records India to offer artists 360-degree deals.

In 2008, T-Series acquired the music catalog of Big music, as they cut a deal with them along with web portal Bollywood Hungama, where all three companies will co-own the current and future music catalogue of Big Entertainment and the same shall be exclusively distributed by T-Series on all platforms in all formats including the current titles in the Big Music catalogue and all future titles in Reliance Big Entertainment including all physical formats, Radio & Television, Mobile and digital formats, across the globe.

== Soundtracks ==
- 2017 Golmaal Again
- 2014 Bobby Jasoos
- 2014 Singham Returns
- 2012 Bumboo
- 2011 Singham
- 2011 Taalismaan
- 2011 Will To Live
- 2010 Golmaal 3
- 2010 Ada... A Way of Life
- 2009 Do Knot Disturb
- 2009 Baabarr
- 2009 Daddy Cool
- 2009 Sikandar
- 2009 Kal Kissne Dekha
- 2009 13B
- 2008 Luck By Chance
- 2008 Golmaal Returns
- 2008 Ek Vivaah Aisa Bhi
- 2008 1920
- 2008 Rock On!!
- 2008 Love Story 2050
- 2008 Summer 2007
- 2007 Khoya Khoya Chand
- 2007 Mumbai Salsa
- 2007 Chhodon Naa Yaar
- 2007 Go
- 2007 Johnny Gaddaar
- 2007 Dil Dosti Etc
- 2007 Dhamaal
- 2007 Marigold: An Adventure in India
- 2007 Cash
- 2006 Golmaal: Fun Unlimited

== Albums ==
Year	Album	Artist(s)
2007	Parineeta	Parineeta Borthakur
2008	Kangkaan	Zubeen Garg, Madhan Ranjan

== See also ==
- List of record labels
