= Through the Eyes of a Painter =

1967 Indian film by M. F. Husain

Through the Eyes of a Painter is a 1967 Indian short film written, directed and filmed by M. F. Husain, an acclaimed Indian painter. The film was produced by the Films Division of Government of India.

== Overview ==
Hussain chose Rajasthan as the setting, a place he had often visited previously to paint. He filmed locations and scenery that were already well known to him, capturing whatever was closest to his heart. The film has a duration of fifteen minutes and contains no dialogue.

The film presents a sequence of visual images: the royal face of a Rajasthani man; a goat moving in front of a tiger model; centuries-old ruins set against an open sky; a hawk in flight over blue waters; schoolchildren dispersing at the sound of a school bell; women bathing at a riverbank; linear patterns in the desert; an anklet lying among these lines; a window featuring sculptural ornamentation; and a polluted canal in front of a house. The camera moves continuously from one subject to another in a fluid, associative manner, with intermittent appearances of objects such as a lantern, an umbrella, and a sandal.

The heart of this film is its music, which was composed by Elchuri Vijaya Raghava Rao of Andhra Pradesh. Hindustani music lovers know Vijaya Raghava Rao as a renowned flute – maestro. He imparted musical training to Ronu Majumdar, another flute – maestro. He also worked in various films and dramas as a musician and actor, music composed by Pandit Ravi Shankar.

The central element of the film is its music, composed by Vijaya Raghava Rao of Andhra Pradesh. In Hindustani classical music, Vijaya Raghava Rao is known as a renowned flute maestro. He trained Ronu Majumdar, who later became a flute maestro in his own right. Vijaya Raghava Rao also worked in various films and stage dramas as a musician and actor, including productions with music composed by Pandit Ravi Shankar.

Husain said, "He rightly understood my feelings and composed the music, otherwise I would have been doomed." The sound was given by another artist from Andhra Pradesh, Jasti Raghavendra Rao, hailing from Eluru.

The film Through the Eyes of a Painter fetched the 1st prize, in The Golden Bear 17th International Film Festival during the first week of July 1967, held in Berlin. It was nominated in the Goa Film Festival as well but unfortunately, it was later withdrawn due to a protest movement against this.

== Awards ==
- 1967: Berlin International Film Festival: Golden Bear: Short Film: M.F. Husain
- 1968: Melbourne International Film Festival, screened
