= Shamshad Hussain =

Indian artist

Shamshad Husain
- Born: Shamshad Husain; 1946; Mumbai, British India
- Died: 24 October 2015 (aged 68–69); New Delhi, India
- Education: Royal College of Art, London
- Known for: Painting
- Notable work: Paints people with a controlled palette
- Father: M. F. Husain
- Relatives: Owais Husain (brother)
- Awards: Lalit Kala Academy's National Award, 1983

Shamshad Hussain (1946 – 24 October 2015) was an Indian artist and the son of M. F. Husain.

== Early life ==
Shamshad was born in Mumbai in 1946.

He attended Baroda College of Fine Arts, where he studied a diploma in painting. He then studied at the Royal College of Art, Hussain claims that his time there "changed my perspective about art".

== Career ==
His first solo exhibition took place in 1968. It was at this exhibition that he sold his first painting for 50 Rs.

== Awards ==
In 1983, Shamshad won the Lalit Kala Academy national award.
