= Lawh Wa Qalam =

Museum in Qatar dedicated to M. F. Husain

- Established: November 28, 2025
- Location: Doha, Qatar
- Coordinates: 25°18′34″N 51°25′54″E
- Type: Art Museum
- Collection size: 150+
- Architect: Martand Khosla
- Owner: Qatar Museums Authority

Lawh Wa Qalam (Arabic: لوح وقلم, lit. 'Canvas and Pen') or M. F. Husain Lawh Wa Qalam is a museum located in Education City on the outskirts of Doha, Qatar. Spanning an area of more than 3,000 square meters, it contains more than 150 works in its collection.

== History ==
Commissioned by the Qatar Foundation, the museum was inaugurated on November 27, 2025, and opened to the public the following day. It is dedicated to the life and works of Indian artist M. F. Husain. Husain, who faced backlash from Hindu nationalists in India due to his nude portrayals of Hindu goddesses, went into a self-imposed exile for his safety in 2006. He relocated to London and Qatar, where he lived until his death in 2011. He received the Qatari citizenship in 2010. The museum contains various works created by Husain during his stay in Qatar. It is said that the creation of the museum was a promise made to Husain before his death by his friend and patron Moza bint Nasser, chair of the Qatar Foundation and mother of current Qatari Emir Tamim bin Hamad Al Thani. In March 2026, Lawh Wa Qalam was selected by TIME magazine for the list of The Worlds Greatest Places of 2026.

== Building ==
The museum building was designed by Indian architect Martand Khosla. The design takes inspiration from a sketch made by Husain in 2008. It consists of two square structures, one blue and one gray, and a connecting cylindrical white tower that serves as a staircase and amphitheater-like seating. Glazed tiles, reminiscent of Central Asian architecture, cover the exterior, shielding the building from heat. The phrase Lawh Wa Qalam (Arabic for "Canvas and Pen") is inscribed on the facade. Entrance is via a golden arched doorway. No natural light is allowed into the upper galleries, where older paintings are kept, to prevent damage. The campus also includes a cafe, a library, a gift shop and an auditorium.

== Collection ==
The museum's collection consists of paintings, tapestries and photographs made by Husain. It includes 35 paintings from the "Arab civilization" series, commissioned by Moza bint Nasser as well as "Humanism", 1950s "Doll's Wedding" and his "Quit India Movement" series. It also includes an installation entitled Seeroo fi al ardh (Arabic for "travel through the earth"), which is one of the last works made by Husain. Conceived in 2009 at the behest of Qatar Foundation, it depicts humanity's progress, consisting of horse figures, sculptures depicting the polymath Abbas ibn Firnas and Leonardo da Vinci's flying machine, and vintage cars. It also includes personal belongings of Husain, such as his Indian passport, which he surrendered in 2010. The Seero fi al ardh was completed and unveiled in 2019 after Husain's death. In addition to his works, there are also other archival items incorporated into the galleries including quotations, sketches, photographs, and a handwritten note from Husain to Sheikha Moza.
