= Khilaaf =

Khilaaf खिलाफ
- Promotional Poster
- Directed by: Rajeev Nagpal
- Written by: K.K. Shukla; Madan Joshi (dialogue)
- Produced by: Anil Tarika
- Starring: Chunky Pandey; Madhuri Dixit
- Cinematography: Anwar Siraj
- Edited by: V.N. Mayekar
- Music by: Laxmikant–Pyarelal
- Distributed by: Raj mediaflix
- Release date: 1991
- Running time: 150 min.
- Country: India
- Language: Hindi

Khilaaf is a 1991 Indian Bollywood film directed by Rajeev Nagpal and produced by Anil Tarika. It stars Chunky Pandey and Madhuri Dixit in pivotal roles.

== Plot ==
Vikram "Vicky" Vir Pratap Singh (Chunky Pandey) is a poor boy who eventually falls in love with the rich Shweta Sangwan (Madhuri Dixit) and vice versa. However, problems arise between the two families because of status. Shweta's father does not approve of the relationship and tries to create misunderstandings between the two. Some of them work, but Shweta finds out the cruelty of her dad. When he attacks Vicky, he leaves him seriously injured and Shweta is forced to marry Bhanupratap, another man who is only marrying her for her money. However, she leaves the wedding at the last minute and meets Vicky at the hospital where he is getting treated for his injuries, just in time to see him die. Broken physically and emotionally by this, Shweta confronts her dad and tells her she will never forgive him, and even though Vicky has left the world, their love will always triumph. She then commits suicide by jumping over the hospital building, leaving her dad to mourn for her. Vicky and Shweta reunite in death.

== Cast ==
- Chunky Pandey... Vikram "Vicky" Veerpratap Singh
- Madhuri Dixit... Shweta "Sonu" R. Sangwan
- Anupam Kher... Rana Ranjit Singh Sangwan
- Mahesh Anand ... Kunwer Bhanupratap Chauhan
- Dina Pathak... Mrs. Singh
- Om Shivpuri... Police Commissioner
- Aruna Irani... Doctor
- Nadira ... Mrs. Chauhan

== Soundtrack ==
#	Title	Singer(s)
1	"Rab Ne Bhool Se"	Sukhwinder Singh
2	"Hum Jitni Baar Jiyenge"	Suresh Wadkar, Kavita Krishnamurthy
3	"Woh Maara"	Sudesh Bhosle
4	"Aaja Sanam" (Female)	Kavita Krishnamurthy
5	"Aaja Sanam" (Male)	Sukhvinder
6	"Tum Bansi Bajaate Ho"	Alka Yagnik, Manhar Udhas
