= Sukhwinder Singh =

Indian singer (born 1971)

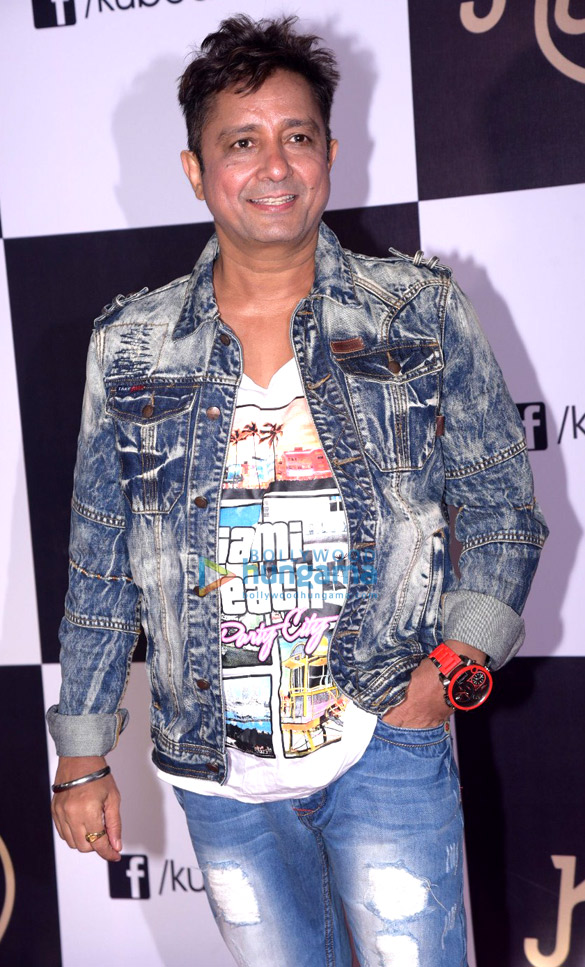
- Singh at the launch of Kube in Bombay in 2017

Background information
- Born: 18 July 1971 (age 55); Amritsar, Punjab, India
- Occupation: Singer
- Years active: 1991–present

Sukhwinder Singh (born 18 July 1971) is an Indian playback singer, music composer, lyricist and music producer who has worked primarily in Hindi films. He has also recorded songs for films and music albums in several other Indian languages, including Telugu, Tamil, Kannada, Punjabi, Marathi, Urdu and Bengali.

Singh was noticed by the composer duo Laxmikant–Pyarelal during his early years as a singer and subsequently worked as a musical arranger on several of their projects during the late 1980s and early 1990s. One of his earliest recorded vocal contributions was in the song "Chitti Aayi Hai" from the film Naam (1986), which was primarily performed by Pankaj Udhas. After recording songs through the late 1980s and 1990s, Singh gained wider recognition with the A. R. Rahman-composed song "Chaiyya Chaiyya" from the film Dil Se.. (1998). The song became one of the most widely recognized tracks of his career and contributed significantly to his prominence as a playback singer. Over the course of his career, he has collaborated with numerous composers and recorded songs across multiple Indian film industries.

Singh has received several national and international honours for his work as a playback singer. He won the National Film Award for Best Male Playback Singer for the song "Bismil" from Haider (2014) and has received Filmfare Award for Best Male Playback Singer twice for "Chaiyya Chaiyya" from Dil Se.. (1998) and "Haule Haule" from Rab Ne Bana Di Jodi (2008). He was among the credited performers of "Jai Ho" from Slumdog Millionaire (2008), a song that received the Academy Award for Best Original Song at the 81st Academy Awards. and the Best Song Written for a Motion Picture at the 52nd Grammy Awards, bringing international recognition to the artists associated with the recording. In addition to these honours, Singh has received awards and nominations from organizations including the IIFA Awards, Zee Cine Awards, Screen Awards, and other Indian music and film award bodies.

== Early life and career ==
Sukhwinder Singh was born on 18 July 1971 in Amritsar, Punjab, into a Sikh family. During his youth, he participated in athletics and was involved in sprinting before developing a greater interest in music. He subsequently received formal musical training under Punjab-based musician B. S. Narang. At the age of 17, he began pursuing a career in music and later released the Punjabi album Munda Southhall Da in collaboration with T. Singh. His early musical career included work with the composer duo Laxmikant–Pyarelal, with whom he served as a music arranger and contributed vocals to chorus sections and minor portions of songs on various projects. One of his early solo playback opportunities came with the song "Aaja Sanam" in the film Khilaaf (1991). In 1997, he made his debut in Tamil cinema with the song "Lucky Lucky" from Ratchagan, composed by A. R. Rahman.

Singh's collaboration with A. R. Rahman continued in subsequent years, and he gained wider recognition with the song "Chaiyya Chaiyya" from Mani Ratnam's Dil Se.. (1998). The song earned him the Filmfare Award for Best Male Playback Singer and remains among the most widely recognized recordings of his career.

In June 2014, he participated in the seventh season of Jhalak Dikhhla Jaa. He sang the 2023 Men's FIH Hockey World Cup anthem, Jai Ho Hindustan Ki composed by Prem Anand.

== Discography ==
=== Studio albums ===
- Nasha Hi Nasha Hai (2000)
- Jashn (2001)

=== As playback singer ===
==== Hindi songs ====
Year	Film	Songs	Composer(s)	Co-Singer(s)	Notes
1986	Naam	"Chithi Aayi Hai, Aayi Hai, Chitthi Aayi Hai"	Laxmikant-Pyarelal	Pankaj Udhas	
1987	Soorma Bhopali	"Tambakoo Nahin Hai"	Dilip Sen – Sameer Sen	Jagdeep, Dilip Sen	
1988	Yateem	"Rut Piya Milan Ki Aayee"	Laxmikant-Pyarelal	Kavita Krishnamurti	
1988	Yateem	"Teri Nigah Pe Sab Kuchh"	Laxmikant-Pyarelal	Mohammed Aziz	
1990	Fateh	"Ho Makhna O Chakhna"	Naresh Sharma	Shabbir Kumar, Nilesh Kumar	
1990	Fateh	"Tera Mera Mere Tera"	Naresh Sharma	Kavita Krishnamurti, Nilesh Kumar, Vinay Mandke, Jayashree Shivram	
1990	Amba	"Sheron Wali Mata Ka Jab Naam"	Laxmikant–Pyarelal	Kavita Krishnamurti, Suresh Wadkar	
1991	Banjaran	"Desh Badalte Hain"	Laxmikant–Pyarelal	Anuradha Paudwal, Mohammed Aziz	
1991	Khilaaf	"Aaja Sanam"(Male)	Laxmikant–Pyarelal		
1991	Khilaaf	"Rab Ne Bhool Se"	Laxmikant–Pyarelal		
1991	Kurbaan	"Deewanon Se Poochho"	Anand–Milind		
1991	Naagmani	"Chan Pardesi Mere Chan"	Anu Malik	Anuradha Paudwal	
1991	Naachnewale Gaanewale	"Sambola Jambo"	Bappi Lahiri		
1991	Naachnewale Gaanewale	"Bekadaro Se Kar"	Bappi Lahiri		
1991	Naachnewale Gaanewale	"Aaye Hum Naachnewale"	Bappi Lahiri		
1991	Saudagar	"Saudagar Sauda Kar"	Laxmikant–Pyarelal	Kavita Krishnamurti, Manhar Udhas	
1991	Saudagar	"Deewane Tere Naam"	Laxmikant–Pyarelal	solo	
1991	Saudagar	"Ilu Ilu"	Laxmikant–Pyarelal	Kavita Krishnamurti, Udit Narayan, Manhar Udhas	
1991	Swarg Yahan Narak Yahan	"Nayan Tere Kiranon Ka Bhandar"	Rajesh Roshan	Anuradha Paudwal, Nitin Mukesh	
1992	Chamatkar	"Dekho Dekho Chamatkar"	Anu Malik	Kumar Sanu, Nandu Bhende	
1992	I Love You	"O Mairi Saagar Mein"	Raamlaxman		
1992	Mera Dil Tere Liye	"Ajab Sawari Gazab Saawar"	Babul Bose	Mohammad Aziz, Sudesh Bhosale, Jolly Mukherjee	
1992	Radha Ka Sangam	"Prema Hai Janmon Ka Sangam"	Anu Malik	Anuradha Paudwal	
1992	Yudhpath	"Tapka Jaye Re Jobanva"	Dilip Sen – Sameer Sen		
1992	Benaam Rishte	"Koi Haseen Badi"	Himself	Anuradha Paudwal	
1993	Lootere	"Oye Pape"	Anand–Milind	Sapna Mukherjee	
1993	Meherbaan	"Jo Bhi Aaya Hai Tere Dware"	Dilip Sen – Sameer Sen		
1995	Raghuveer	"Mujhe Ishq Da"	Dilip Sen – Sameer Sen		
1995	Raghuveer	"Bindiyan Bole"	Dilip Sen – Sameer Sen		
1996	Rajkumar	"Aaja Aaja Tu Aanewale"	Laxmikant–Pyarelal	Iqbal Afzai, Sabri, Jayshree Shivram	
1997	Dus	"Mahiya"	Shankar–Ehsaan–Loy		
1997	Itihaas	"Juda Apne Dilbar Se"	Dilip Sen – Sameer Sen	Alka Yagnik, Shankar Mahadevan	
1998	Dil Se..	"Chaiyya Chaiyya"	A. R. Rahman	Sapna Awasthi	
1998	Sham Ghansham	"Aandi Aai Jaandi Aai"	Vishal Bhardwaj	Hema Sardesai	
1998	Doli Saja Ke Rakhna	"Chal Kheva Re Kheva"	A. R. Rahman	Ranu Mukherjee	
1998	Himmatwala	"Hum Maane Hum Maane"	Tabun		
1999	Dil Kya Kare	"Menu Lagan Lagi"	Jatin–Lalit	Jaspinder Narula	
1999	Daag: The Fire	"Lucky Kabootar"	Rajesh Roshan		
1999	Phool Aur Aag	"In Hawao Ke Daman Pe Hai"			
1999	Biwi No.1	"Hai Hai Mirchi"	Anu Malik	Alka Yagnik	
1999	Biwi No.1	"Mehboob Mere"	Anu Malik	Alka Yagnik	
1999	Dillagi	"Dillagi Dillagi"	Shankar-Ehsaan-Loy	Abhijeet, Kavita Krishnamurti, Udit Narayan, Alka Yagnik, Jaspinder Narula, Shaan, Shankar Mahadevan, Mahalakshmi Iyer	
1999	Dillagi	"Dhoom Dhoom Luck Luck"	Himself	Mahendra Kapoor, Shankar Mahadevan, Mridula Desai, Mohini Bramhabhatt	
1999	Khoobsurat	"Ghash Khake Ho Gaya"	Jatin-Lalit		
1999	Thakshak	"Dholna"	A. R. Rahman		
1999	Thakshak	"Rang De" (As Lyricist)	A. R. Rahman	Asha Bhosle (singer)	
1999	Jaanwar	"Mera Yaar Dildaar"	Anand-Milind	Jaspinder Narula, Alka Yagnik, Sonu Nigam	
1999	Hindustan Ki Kasam	"Jalwa Jalwa"	Himself	Udit Narayan, Jaspinder Narula	
1999	Hindustan Ki Kasam	"Main Hindustan Hoon"	Himself		
1999	Hindustan Ki Kasam	"Ishq Brandi"	Himself		
1999	Hindustan Ki Kasam	"Is Paar Sarhad Ke"	Himself	Anuradha Paudwal	
1999	Taal	"Nahin Samne"	A. R. Rahman	Hariharan	
1999	Taal	"Ni Main Samajhh Gayi"	A. R. Rahman	Richa Sharma	
1999	Taal	"Ramta Jogi"	A. R. Rahman	Alka Yagnik	
1999	Taal	"Kariye Naa"	A. R. Rahman	Alka Yagnik	
1999	Taal	"Taal Se Taal" (western version)	A. R. Rahman		
1999	Taal	"Ishq Bina Ishq Bina"	A. R. Rahman	Kavita Krishnamurti	
2000	Deewane	"Qayamat"	Sanjeev–Darshan	Alka Yagnik	
2000	Deewane	"Jogiya"	Sanjeev–Darshan	Anuradha Paudwal	
2000	Deewane	"Ishq Da Gunjal"	Sanjeev–Darshan	Jaspinder Narula	
2000	Deewane	"Sajna Ne Phool Marya"	Sanjeev–Darshan	Jaspinder Narula	
2000	Khauff	"Raja Ki Qaid Mein"	Sajid-Wajid	Jaspinder Narula	
2000	Khauff	"Kehte Hain Jo Log Ishq Walon Ko Samjhaaye(Jo Dil Rakhta Hai Wo Mauj)"			
2000	Hum To Mohabbat Karega	"Leh Liya Leh Liya"			
2000	Refugee	"Jise Tu Na Mila"			
2000	Jungle	"Patli Kamar"			
2000	Astitva	"Chal Chal Mere Sang Sang"			
2000	Astitva	"Sabse Pehle Sangeet Bana"			
2000	Astitva	"Zindagi Kya Baat Hai"			
2000	Kurukshetra	"Banthan"			
2000	Raja Ko Rani Se Pyar Ho Gaya	"To Rabba Ki Kariye"			
2000	Jis Desh Mein Ganga Rehta Hain	"O Piya O Piya Sun"	Anand Raaj Anand	Sadhana Sargam	
2000	Jis Desh Mein Ganga Rehta Hain	"Prem Jaal Mein"	Anand Raaj Anand	Anuradha Sriram	
2001	Zubeidaa	"Main Albeli"			
2001	One 2 Ka 4	"Allay Allay"			
2001	Lagaan: Once Upon a Time in India	"Ghanan Ghanan"	A. R. Rahman	Udit Narayan, Alka Yagnik, Shankar Mahadevan, Shaan	
2001	Lagaan: Once Upon a Time in India	"Mitwa"	A. R. Rahman	Udit Narayan, Alka Yagnik, Srinivas	
2001	Yaadein	"Jab Dil Miley"			
2001	Yaadein	"Chanda Taare"			
2001	Aks	"Rabba Rabba" (Duet)			
2001	Bas Itna Sa Khwaab Hai	"Dil Nasheen"			
2001	Monsoon Wedding	"Kaavaan Kaavaan"	Sukhwinder Singh		
2002	Na Tum Jaano Na Hum	"Chunariya"			
2002	The Legend of Bhagat Singh	"Pagdi Sambhal Jatta"			
2002	The Legend of Bhagat Singh	"Dil Se Niklegi"			
2002	The Legend of Bhagat Singh	"Shora So Pahchaniye"			
2002	The Legend of Bhagat Singh	"Kasam Tumko Watan"			
2002	The Legend of Bhagat Singh	"Des Mere Des"			
2002	Yeh Hai Jalwa	"London Mein India"			
2002	Desh Devi	"Mitti Aag Hawa Pani Se"			
2002	Shakti: The Power	"Dumroo Baje"			
2002	Annarth	"Ankhiyan Na Mila"			
2002	Karz: The Burden of Truth	"Jhoom Jhoom Na"			
2002	Kaante	"Maahi Ve"			
2003	Border Hindustan Ka	"Powarh Paigaya"			
2003	Dum	"Babuji Zara Dheere Chalo"			
2003	Dum	"Suntaja"			
2003	Baaz: A Bird in Danger	"Chehre Pe"			
2003	Kaise Kahoon Ke... Pyaar Hai	"O Mere Kisan Kanaiya"			
2003	Chalte Chalte	"Layi Ve Na Gaye"			
2003	Chalte Chalte	"Tujhpar Gagan Se"			
2003	Supari	"Ek Saans Aur Ek Saans Kam"			
2003	Calcutta Mail	"Intezar Hai Tera"			
2003	Tere Naam	"Lagan Lagi"			
2003	Janasheen	"Marhaba"			
2003	Sssshhh...	"Ishq Da Maara"			
2004	Khakee	"Uppar Wale"			
2004	Meenaxi: A Tale of Three Cities	"Chinnamma Chilakkamma"			
2004	Naach	"Berang Zindagi"			
2004	Ab Tumhare Hawale Watan Sathiyo	"Shivji Satya Hai"	Anu Malik	Sonu Nigam	Lyrics by Sameer
2004	Musafir	"Saaki"			
2004	Musafir	"Ishq Kabhi Kario Na"			
2005	Kisna: The Warrior Poet	"Woh Kisna Hai"			
2005	Kisna: The Warrior Poet	"Wohi Din Aa Gaya"			
2005	Kisna: The Warrior Poet	"Aham Brahmasmi"			
2005	Padmashree Laloo Prasad Yadav	"Deewana"			
2005	Padmashree Laloo Prasad Yadav	"Jadoo (Female)" As Composer			
2005	Padmashree Laloo Prasad Yadav	"Jadoo (Male)"			
2005	Shabd	"Mat Jaa"			
2005	Bunty Aur Babli	"Bunty Aur Babli"			
2005	Bunty Aur Babli	"Nach Baliye"			
2005	Ramji Londonwaley	"London London"			
2005	Garam Masala	"Chori Chori"			
2005	Ek Khiladi Ek Haseena	"Nasha"			
2005	Ek Ajnabee	"Ek Ajnabi (Mama Told Me)"			
2005	Dosti: Friends Forever	"Ishq Na Ishq Ho"			
2005	Paheli	"Phir Raat Kati"			
2005	Water	"Aayo Re Sakhi"			
2005	Water	"Piya Ho"			
2005	Water	"Bhangari Marori"			
2005	Mangal Pandey: The Rising	"Mangal Mangal – Aatma"			
2005	Mangal Pandey: The Rising	"Takey Takey"			
2006	Omkara	"Omkara"			
2006	Omkara	"Beedi"		Sunidhi Chauhan	
2006	Jaan-E-Mann	"Jaane Ke Jaane Na"			
2006	Jaane Hoga Kya	"Bechaniyan Badhne Lagi"			
2006	Jaane Hoga Kya	"Teri Mast Mast Jawani"			
2006	Shaadi Se Pehle	"Bijuriya"	Himesh Reshammiya	Alka Yagnik	lyrics by Sameer
2006	Shaadi Se Pehle	"Sache Aashiq"	Himesh Reshammiya	Alka Yagnik	lyrics by Sameer
2006	Shaadi Se Pehle	"Bijuriya" (remix)	Himesh Reshammiya	Alka Yagnik	lyrics by Sameer
2006	Shaadi Se Pehle	"Ankhiyon Se Gal Kar Gayi"	Himesh Reshammiya	Sunidhi Chauhan, Sonu Nigam and Himesh Reshammiya	lyrics by Sameer
2006	Shaadi Se Pehle	"Ankhiyon Se Gal Kar Gayi" (remix)	Himesh Reshammiya	Sunidhi Chauhan, Sonu Nigam and Himesh Reshammiya	lyrics by Sameer
2007	Aag	"Mehbooba"	Ganesh Hegde		
2007	Aaja Nachle	"Soniye Mil Ja"	Salim–Sulaiman		
2007	Apna Asmaan	"Katra Katra"	Lesle Lewis		
2007	Apna Asmaan	"Katra Katra"(Reprise)	Lesle Lewis		
2007	Chak De! India	"Chak De India"	Salim–Sulaiman		
2007	Chhodon Naa Yaar	"Luta Hai Zamane Ne"	Anand Raaj Anand		
2007	Chooriyan	"Gudiyan"	Sukhwinder Singh		
2007	Chooriyan	"Chaandi Ki Teri"	Sukhwinder Singh		
2007	Chooriyan	"Chaandi Ki"(Remix)	Sukhwinder Singh		
2007	Jhoom Barabar Jhoom	"Jhoom Barabar"	Shankar–Ehsaan–Loy		
2007	Johnny Gaddaar	"The Caper Begins"	Shankar–Ehsaan–Loy		
2007	Just Married	"Ram Milaye Jodi"	Pritam		
2007	Just Married	"Baat Pakki"(Remix)	Pritam		
2007	Just Married	"Ram Milaye"(Remix)	Pritam		
2007	Just Married	"Baat Pakki"(Version ll)	Pritam		
2007	Just Married	"Ram Milaye"(Sad)	Pritam		
2007	Kaafila	"Hum Raks"	Sukhwinder Singh		
2007	Kaafila	"Kabhi Kabhi"	Sukhwinder Singh		
2007	Kaafila	"Jab Tak Hai Saans"	Sukhwinder Singh		
2007	Kaafila	"Sandesa Aaya"	Sukhwinder Singh		
2007	Kaafila	"Chaala Kaafila"	Sukhwinder Singh		
2007	Kaafila	"Hum Raks"(Remix)	Sukhwinder Singh		
2007	Kaisey Kahein	"Aarzoo Hai Pyaar Ki"	Pritam		
2007	No Smoking	"Kash Laga"	Vishal Bhardwaj		
2007	No Smoking	"Phook De"	Vishal Bhardwaj		
2007	Om Shanti Om	"Dard E Disco"	Vishal–Shekhar		
2007	Om Shanti Om	"Dard E Disco"(Remix)	Vishal–Shekhar		
2007	Om Shanti Om	"Om Shanti"(Medley Mix)	Vishal–Shekhar		
2007	Shootout at Lokhandwala	"Unke Nashe"	Anand Raaj Anand		
2007	Shootout at Lokhandwala	"Unke Nashe"(Remix)	Anand Raaj Anand		
2007	The Blue Umbrella	"Barfaan"	Vishal Bhardwaj		
2008	Bachna Ae Haseeno	"Jogi Mahi"	Vishal–Shekhar		
2008	Bhoothnath	"Banku Bhaiya"	Vishal–Shekhar		
2008	Bhoothnath	"Samay Ka Pahiya"	Vishal–Shekhar		
2008	Black & White	"Haq Allah"	Sukhwinder Singh		
2008	Black & White	"Peer Manava"	Sukhwinder Singh		
2008	Black & White	"Main Chala"	Sukhwinder Singh		
2008	Black & White	"Jogi Aaya"	Sukhwinder Singh		
2008	Black & White	"Jogi Aaya"(Remix)	Sukhwinder Singh		
2008	Bombay to Bangkok	"Bombay To Bangkok"	Salim–Sulaiman		
2008	Contract	"Maula Khair Kare"	Amar Mohile		
2008	Deshdrohi	"Bewajah Youn"	Nikhil	Khushboo Jain	
2008	Fashion	"Fashion Ka Jalwa"	Salim–Sulaiman		
2008	Fashion	"Fashion Ka"(Remix)	Salim–Sulaiman		
2008	Good Luck	"Main Sajda"	Anu Malik		
2008	Good Luck	"Main Sajda"(Version ll)	Anu Malik		
2008	Halla Bol	"Jab Tak Hai Dum"	Sukhwinder Singh		
2008	Halla Bol	"Shabad Gurbani"	Sukhwinder Singh		
2008	Hari Puttar: A Comedy of Terrors	"Tutari"	Aadesh Shrivastava		
2008	Heroes	"Makhana"	Sajid–Wajid		
2008	Heroes	"Makhana You My Makhana"	Sajid–Wajid		
2008	Jaane Tu... Ya Jaane Na	"Jaane Tu Meri Kya Hai"	A. R. Rahman		
2008	Jumbo	"Badhte Chalo"	Ram Sampath		
2008	Kidnap	"Meri Ek Ada Shola"	Pritam		
2008	Mehbooba	"Deewana"	Ismail Darbar		
2008	Meerabai Not Out	"Hai Rama"	Sandesh Shandilya		
2008	Mr. Black Mr. White	"Teetar"	Jatin–Lalit		
2008	Mr. Black Mr. White	"Teetar"(Remix)	Jatin–Lalit		
2008	Rab Ne Bana Di Jodi	"Haule Haule"	Salim–Sulaiman		
2008	Tashan	"Dil Haara"	Vishal–Shekhar		
2008	Tashan	"Dil Dance Maare"	Vishal–Shekhar		
2009	Slumdog Millionaire	"Jai Ho"			
2009	Billu	"Marjaani"	Pritam		
2009	Kaminey	"Dhan Te Nan"	Vishal Bhardwaj	Vishal Dadlani	lyrics by Gulzar
2009	Kaminey	"Dhan Te Nan" (remix)	Vishal Bhardwaj	Vishal Dadlani	lyrics by Gulzar
2009	Kaminey	"Fatak"	Vishal Bhardwaj	Kailash Kher	lyrics by Gulzar
2009	Kurbaan	"Dua"	Salim-Sulaiman	Kailash Kher	
2009	Blue	"Aaj Dil Gustakh Hai"	A. R. Rahman	Shreya Ghoshal, Benny Dayal, Shi Millhouse, Henry Kuruvilla, Raven Millhouse	
2009	Blue	"Aaj Dil Gustakh Hai (Remix)"	A. R. Rahman	Shreya Ghoshal	
2009	Blue	"Blue (Theme)" (as lyricist)	A. R. Rahman		
2009	Connections	"Mann Chandre"			Album
2009	Bolo Raam	"Maa Tere Jaisa Koi"			
2010	Ishqiya	"Ibn-E-Batuta"	Vishal Bhardwaj		
2010	Raavan	"Thok De Killi"	A. R. Rahman		
2010	Dabangg	"Hud Hud Dabangg"	Sajid-Wajid		
2010	Atithi Tum Kab Jaoge?	"Jyoti Jalaile"			
2010	Veer	"Taali"	Sajid-Wajid	Sonu Nigam	
2010	Band Baaja Baaraat	"Dum Dum (Sufi Mix)"	Salim-Sulaiman		
2010	Tees Maar Khan	"Badey Dilwala"	Vishal-Shekhar	Shreya Ghoshal, Vishal, Shekhar	
2011	Yeh Saali Zindagi	"Sararara"			
2011	Singham	"Singham"	Ajay–Atul		
2011	Teen Thay Bhai	"Aar Dariya"			
2011	Teen Thay Bhai	"Chakkar Chakkar"			
2011	Teen Thay Bhai	"Main Chalna Bhool Gaya"			
2011	Teen Thay Bhai	"Bhai Ke Chakkar" (Fultu Mix)			
2011	I Am Singh	"I Am Singh"			
2011	I Am Singh	"Channd Paregge"			
2011	I Am Singh	"Turban Victory"			
2012	Kahaani	"Tore Bina"			
2012	Arjun: The Warrior Prince	"Karam Ki Talwar"			
2012	Agneepath	"Shah Ka Rutba"	Ajay–Atul		
2012	Housefull 2	"Anarkali Disco Chali"	Sajid-Wajid	Mamta Sharma	
2012	Ek Tha Tiger	"Banjaara"	Sohail Sen		
2012	Dabangg 2	"Dabangg Reloaded (Udd Udd Dabangg)"	Sajid-Wajid		
2013	Matru Ki Bijlee Ka Mandola	"Matru Ki Bijlee Ka Mandola"	Vishal Bhardwaj		
2013	Matru Ki Bijlee Ka Mandola	"Lootnewale"	Vishal Bhardwaj		
2013	Matru Ki Bijlee Ka Mandola	"Lootnewale (Reprise)"	Vishal Bhardwaj		
2013	Raanjhanaa	"Piya Milenge"	A. R. Rahman		
2013	Bhaag Milkha Bhaag	"Slow Motion Angreza"	Shankar-Ehsaan-Loy		
2013	Zanjeer	"Khochey Pathan Ki Zubaan (Qawaali)"			
2014	Dedh Ishqiya	"Horn OK Please"	Vishal Bhardwaj	Yo Yo Honey Singh	
2014	Zed Plus	"Maula Pal Mein Palat De Baazi"			
2014	Zed Plus	"Fislan Hai"			
2014	Zed Plus	"Ishq Ishq"			
2014	Kill Dil	"Happy Budday to You"	Shankar-Ehsaan-Loy		
2014	Happy New Year	"Satakli Hein Satakli"	Vishal-Shekhar		
2014	Happy New Year	"World Dance Medley"	Vishal-Shekhar		
2014	Haider	"Bismil"	Vishal Bhardwaj		
2014	Haider	"Ek Aur Bismil"	Vishal Bhardwaj		
2014	Million Dollar Arm	"Makhna"			
2015	Dil Dhadakne Do	"Gallan Goodiyaan"	Shankar-Ehsaan-Loy	Farhan Akhtar, Yashita Sharma	
2015	Jaanisaar	"Aye Zulfe–E-Pareshaan "			
2015	Jaanisaar	"Har Taraf Andhera Hai"			
2015	Talvar	"Patli Gali"			
2015	Tamasha	"Chali kahani"	A. R. Rahman		
2015	Bajirao Mastani	"Gajanana"	Sanjay Leela Bhansali		
2016	Shivaay	"Bolo Har Har Har"	Mithoon	Mohit Chauhan, Badshah, The Vamps	
2016	Sarbjit	"Tung Lak"			
2016	Sarbjit	"Meherbaan"			
2016	Amar Prem	"Amar Prem"			
2016	Janatha Garage	"Jai Ho Janatha"			
2016	Sultan	"Sultan (Title Track)"	Vishal-Shekhar	Shadaab Faridi	
2016	Jai Gangaajal	"Tetua"	Salim-Sulaiman		
2016	Motu Patlu: King of Kings	"Motu Aur Patlu Ki Jodi"			
2016	Motu Patlu: King of Kings	"Jungle Hai Jungle"			
2016	Zindagi Kitni Haseen Hay	"Kitni Baar"			
2017	Sachin: A Billion Dreams	"Sachin Sachin"			
2017	Tiger Zinda Hai	"Zinda Hai"	Vishal-Shekhar		
2017	Rangoon	"Tippa"	Vishal Bhardwaj		
2017	Rangoon	"Julia"			
2017	Raees	"Udi Udi Jaye"	Ram Sampath	Bhoomi Trivedi, Keerthi Sagathiya	
2017	Jolly LLB 2	"O Re Rangreza (Qawaali)"			
2017	Lucknow Central	"Kaavaan Kaavaan (Remix)"			
2017	Bhoomi	"Daag"			
2017	Sarkar 3	"Gussa"			
2017	Sarkar 3	"Angry Mix"			
2017	Sarkar 3	"Shakti"			
2017	Mom	"Kooke Kawn"	A. R. Rahman		
2017	Laali Ki Shaadi Mein Laaddoo Deewana	"Laali Ki Shaadi"			
2017	Toilet: Ek Prem Katha	"Bakheda"			
2018	Sui Dhaaga	"Sab Badiya Hai"	Anu Malik		
2018	Thugs of Hindostan	"Vashmalle"	Ajay–Atul	Vishal Dadlani	
2018	Thugs of Hindostan	"Manzoor-E-Khuda"	Ajay–Atul	Sunidhi Chauhan, Shreya Ghoshal	
2018	Zero	"Isaaqbaazi"	Ajay–Atul	Divya Kumar	
2018	Pataakha	"Gali Gali"	Vishal Bhardwaj		
2018	Sanju	"Kar Har Maidaan Fateh"	Vikram Montrose	Shreya Ghoshal	
2018	Raid	"Black"	Amit Trivedi		
2018	Bhaiaji Superhit	"Om Namah Shivay"			
2019	Manikarnika – The Queen of Jhansi	"Bolo Kab Pratikar Karoge"	Shankar-Ehsaan-Loy		
2019	Thackeray	"Saheb Tu Sarkar Tu"			
2019	Ek Ladki Ko Dekha Toh Aisa Laga	"House Party Song"	Rochak Kohli	Arjun Kanungo, Parry G	Written by Gurpreet Saini
2019	Sonchiriya	"Naina Na Maar"	Vishal Bhardwaj		
2019	Milan Talkies	"Bakaiti"			
2019	Kesari	"Deh Shiva (Male Version)"			
2019	PM Narendra Modi	"Saugandh Mujhe Iss Mitti Ki"			
2019	Setters	"Kartootein"			
2019	Bharat	"Turpeya"	Vishal-Shekhar		
2019	Bharat	"Thap Thap"	Vishal-Shekhar		
2019	Marne Bhi Do Yaaron	"Vo Hai Shivay"			
2019	Prassthanam	"Haji Ali"	Vikram Montrose		
2019	Housefull 4	"Chammo"	Sohail Sen	Shreya Ghoshal, Shadaab Faridi	
2019	Commando 3	"Iraade Kar Buland"	Vikram Montrose		
2020	Tahnaji	"Maay Bhavani"	Ajay–Atul	Shreya Ghoshal	
2020	Gunjan Saxena: The Kargil Girl	"Dhoom Dhadaka"	Amit Trivedi		
2021	Chandigarh Kare Aashiqui	Tumbe Te Zumba	Sachin-Jigar		
2022	Dasvi	"Thaan Liya"	Sachin-Jigar		
2022	Bhediya	"Jungle Mein Kaand"	Sachin-Jigar	Vishal Dadlani, Siddharth Basrur	
2022	Mere Desh Ki Dharti	"Mere Desh Ki Dharti Title Song"	Vikram Montrose		
2022	Holy Cow	"Madari"	Sukhwinder Singh		
2022	Shamshera	"Shamshera Title Track"	Mithoon	Abhishek Naiwal	
2022	Shamshera	"Parinda"	Mithoon	Abhishek Naiwal	
2022	Shamshera	"Hunkar"	Mithoon	Richa Sharma, Mithoon	
2022	Cuttputlli	"Rabba"	Dr Zeus		
2022	India Lockdown	"Ghor Bhasad"	Rohith Kulkarni		
2023	Kuttey	"Azadi"	Vishal Bhardwaj		
2023	Kuttey	"Phir Dhan Te Nan"	Vishal Bhardwaj	Vishal Dadlani	
2023	Kanjoos Makhichoos	"Kho Gaye"	Sachin–Jigar		
2023	Adipurush	"Huppa Huiya"	Ajay-Atul		
2023	Gadar 2	"Sura Soi"	Mithoon		
2024	Laapataa Ladies	"Doubtwa"	Ram Sampath		
2024	Kaagaz 2	"Aaj Garda Macha"	Sharib-Toshi		
2024	Kaagaz 2	"Aaj Garda Macha (Thali Version)"	Sharib-Toshi		
2025	Fateh	"Waaheguru Kahey Mann Mera"	Haroon–Gavin		
2025	Tere Ishk Mein	"Ladki Jaisi"	A. R. Rahman		
2026	Border 2	"Tara Rum Pum Pum"	Mithoon		
2026	O'Romeo	"Paan Ki Dukaan"	Vishal Bhardwaj	Rekha Bhardwaj	

==== Telugu songs ====
Year	Film	Songs	Composer(s)	Co-artist(s)
1997	Rakshakudu	"Lucky Lucky"	A. R. Rahman	Swarnalatha, S. P. Balasubrahmanyam
1998	Prematho	"Chayya Chayya"(Duet Version)	A. R. Rahman	Malgudi Subha
1998	Prematho	"Chayya Chayya"(Male Version)	A. R. Rahman	
1999	Raja Kumarudu	"Rama Sakkanodamma"	Mani Sharma	K. S. Chithra
1999	Ravoyi Chandamama	"Gudu Gudu Guncham"	Mani Sharma	
1999	Seenu	"O Manali O Manali"	Mani Sharma	Swarnalatha
1999	Sultan	"Nandi Konda Meeda"	Koti	
1999	Sultan	"Shabba Shabba"	Koti	
1999	Yamajathakudu	"Ding Dong Delhi Paparo"	Vandemataram Srinivas	
1999	Yamajathakudu	"Vandhanalu Vandhanalu"	Vandemataram Srinivas	
2000	Annayya	"Aata Kaavala"	Mani Sharma	
2000	Manasunna Maaraju	"Eddula Bandi Ekki"	Vandemataram Srinivas	Nithyasree Mahadevan
2000	Kshemamga Velli Labhamga Randi	"Joru Joruga"	Vandemataram Srinivas	Nithyasree Mahadevan
2000	Goppinti Alludu	"Nee Height India Gatu"	Koti	
2000	Goppinti Alludu	"Naachere Naachere"	Koti	
2000	Choosoddaam Randi	"Dumuvulu"	M. M. Keeravaani	
2000	Choosoddaam Randi	"Anda Pinda Bramhanda"	M. M. Keeravaani	
2000	Moodu Mukkalaata	"Prema Prema Andi"	M. M. Srilekha	
2000	Rayalaseema Ramanna Chowdary	"Buchimallu Buchimallu"	Mani Sharma	K. S. Chithra
2000	Azad	"Hai Hai Nayaka"	Mani Sharma	K. S. Chithra
2000	Vamsi	"Veyinchukunte Baguntadi"	Mani Sharma	K. S. Chithra
2000	Ammo! Okato Tareekhu	"Amrutha Kadale"	Vandemataram Srinivas	Sadhana Sargam
2000	Maa Annayya	"Kadile Andala Nadi"	S. A. Rajkumar	Anuradha Sriram
2000	Tirumala Tirupati Venkatesa	"Abbo Naa Bandaru"	Vandemataram Srinivas	
2000	Oke Maata	"Kolo Kolo Koyilalu"	Koti	
2000	Oke Maata	"Maa Manchi"	Koti	
2000	Ninnu Chusaka	"Gaali Vaanai Dollarlu"	S. A. Rajkumar	
2001	Mrugaraju	"Dammentho Chupincharo"	Mani Sharma	Swarnalatha
2001	Narasimha Naidu	"Nadhir Dhinna"	Mani Sharma	Swarnalatha
2001	Devi Putrudu	"Okata Renda"	Mani Sharma	Swarnalatha
2001	Priyamaina Neeku	"Mastu Mastu"	Shiva Shankar	Swarnalatha
2001	Deevinchandi	"Ori Bramhachari"	S. A. Rajkumar	
2001	Deevinchandi	"Ammammo Chaligavundi"	S. A. Rajkumar	
2001	Itlu Sravani Subramanyam	"Ramasakkani"	Chakri	
2001	Adhipathi	"Aasa Paduthunnadi"	Koti	K. S. Chithra
2001	Raa	"Yemito Yekkado"	Gurukiran	
2001	Sampangi	"Nachave Bhama"	Ghantadi Krishma	
2001	Akka Bavekkada	"Mensarey Mensarey"	S. A. Rajkumar	
2001	Tholi Valapu	"Boforce Bullemma"	Vandemataram Srinivas	
2001	Chandu	"Love Me Now"	K Veeru	
2002	Lahiri Lahiri Lahirilo	"Kilimire"	M. M. Keeravaani	K. S. Chithra
2002	Adrustam	"Moraakko"	Dhina	
2002	Aaduthu Paaduthu	"Chamakku Chamakku"	Chakri	
2002	Manasutho	"Sikakulam Pilla"	Ashirwad	Sadhana Sargam
2002	Manasunte Chaalu	"Ososi Pilla Anthesi"	Shiva Shankar	
2002	Nuvvunte Chaalu	"Rexona Pilla"	Akash	
2002	Mandharam	"Gulabi Buggala"(Version ll)	Ghantadi Krishna	
2002	Kondaveeti Simhasanam	"Chunchori Churiya"	Koti	
2003	Oka Radha Iddaru Krishnula Pelli	"Lovvudhoma"	Chakri	
2003	Vishnu	"Happy Happy"	Ismail Darbar	Udit Narayan
2004	Ammayi Bagundi	"Harilo Ranga Hari"	M. M. Srilekha	
2005	Dhairyam	"Hoirama Hoirama"	Anup Rubens	
2005	Manasu Maata Vinadhu	"Saradaaga Untam"	Kalyani Malik	
2006	Chukkallo Chandrudu	"Dolna Dolna"	Chakri	
2006	Bangaram	"Maaro Masti Maaro"	Vidyasagar	Anuradha Sriram
2007	Boys And Girls	"Aagamegha"	Ravi Prakash	
2007	Yamagola Malli Modalayindi	"Adukovatanike"	Jeevan Thomas	
2008	Baladur	"Tella Cheera Ok"	K. M. Radha Krishnan	Anuradha Sriram
2008	Adivishnu	"Peechu Mitai"	M. M. Srilekha	
2009	Blue	"Gundey Lo Nippundiley"	A. R. Rahman	Shreya Ghoshal, Benny Dayal, Shi Millhouse, Henry Kuruvilla, Raven Millhouse
2010	Brindavanam	"Chinnado Vaipu"	S. Thaman	Geetha Madhuri
2012	Srimannarayana	"Ottedhunane Chuttedunane"	Chakri	
2016	Janatha Garage	"Jayaho Janatha"	Devi Sri Prasad	Vijay Prakash
2022	Shamshera	"Shamshera Title Track"	Mithoon	Abhishek Nailwal
2022	Shamshera	"Chamak Chamak Sithara"	Mithoon	Chaganti Sahithi, Abhishek Nailwal
2022	Shamshera	"Malli Egirev Gaa"	Mithoon	Abhishek Nailwal
2022	@Love	"Soodu Soodu"	Sunny Manik	
2023	Adipurush	"Huppa Huiya"	Ajay-Atul	
2023	Vyooham	"Deeksha"	Keertana Sesh	

==== Kannada songs ====
Year	Film	Song	Composer	Writer(s)	Co-artist(s)
1999	Sneha	"Surya Sutthangilla"	V Ravichandran	K. Kalyan	Anuradha Sriram
2002	Hollywood	"Sakkathagide Hollywood"	Gurukiran	Upendra	Gurukiran, Allwyn
2005	Encounter Dayanayak	"Oh Mehabooba"	R. P. Patnaik	Gurukiran	
2005	Namma Basava	"Myna Kooge"	Gurukiran	Kaviraj	Sunitha S Murali
2005	Siddu	"Katiko Katiko"	R. P. Patnaik	K Mahesh Sukhadare	Chaitra H. G.
2007	Masti	"Mastire"	Gurukiran	K. Kalyan	Malgudi Subha
2009	Karanji	"Kumabarikiki Kumbariki"	Veer Samarth	Sant Shishunal Sharief	
2009	Karanji	"Kumabarikiki"(Band Version)	Veer Samarth	Sant Shishunal Sharief	
2009	Thabbali	"Elumale Maadesha"	Neel	Kaviraj	
2011	Hudugaru	"Yen Chandane"	V. Harikrishna	V. Nagendra Prasad	Kailash Kher, Vijay Prakash, Priya Himesh
2013	Lakshmi	"Lakshmi No One Can Touch"	Gurukiran		
2016	Santheyalli Nintha Kabira	"Leelemayana Leeleyu"	Ismail Darbar	Gopala Vajpayee	
2020	Maduve Madri Sari Hogtane	"Mayire"	Avinash Basutkar		
2023	Adipurush	"Huppa Huiya"	Ajay-Atul		

==== Tamil songs ====
Year	Film	Song	Composer	Co-singer(s)
1997	Ratchagan	"Lucky Lucky"	A. R. Rahman	S. P. Balasubrahmanyam, Swarnalatha
1998	Uyire	"Thaiyya Thaiyya"(Duet)	A. R. Rahman	Malgudi Subha, Palakkad Sriram
1998	Uyire	"Thaiyya Thaiyya"(Male)	A. R. Rahman	Srinivas
1999	Poovellam Kettuppar	"CBI Enge"	Yuvan Shankar Raja	
1999	Hello	"Salam Gulamu"	Deva	
1999	Mannavaru Chinnavaru	"Kathi Vaitha"	Geethapriyan	Ranjani
1999	Sandhitha Velai	"Ceylon Singala penne"	Deva	Sabesh
2000	Uyirile Kalanthathu	"Husaine Husaine"	Deva	Malgudi Subha
2000	Appu	"Punnagaikku"	Deva	Anupama Deshpande, S. P. Charan
2000	Pennin Manathai Thottu	"Naan Saltu Kotta"	S. A. Rajkumar	Krishnaraj
2000	Doubles	"Ayei Ponddattikkum"	Srikanth Deva	Sujatha Mohan
2000	Vaanathaippola	"Nathiye Adi Nayil Nathiye"	S. A. Rajkumar	Anuradha Sriram
2001	Dosth	"Yeh Sal Sal Salakuthu"	Deva	
2001	Aanandham	"Adi Koochatha"	S. A. Rajkumar	Swarnalatha
2001	12B	"Jothi Neranjava"	Harris Jeyaraj	Febi Mani
2004	Ghilli	"Arjunaru Villu"	Vidyasagar	Manikka Vinayagam
2004	Udhaya	"Thiruvallikeni Rani"	A. R. Rahman	Karthik
2006	E	"Orey Murai"	Srikanth Deva	Sangeetha, Vaishali
2006	Boys And Girls	"Aagamega"	Sirpy	
2006	Mercury Pookkal	"Malavaar"	Karthik Raja	Bobbie
2006	Dishyum	"Kitta Nerungi Vaadi"	Vijay Antony	Gayathri, Vijay Antony
2006	Saravana	"Ennai Mattum Venam"	Srikanth Deva	Rita
2006	Manathodu Mazhaikalam	"Welcome To"	Karthik Raja	Rahul Seth
2007	Ninaithu Ninaithu Parthen	"Aandi Patti Party"	Joshua Sridhar	
2010	Eesan	"Meyyana Inbam"	James Vasanthan	Benny Dayal, Sunandan
2022	Shamshera	"Singam"	Mithoon	Abhishek Nailwal
2023	Adipurush	"Huppa Huiya"	Ajay-Atul	

==== Marathi songs ====
Year	Film	Song	Music
2009	Me Shivajiraje Bhosale Boltoy	"O Raje"	Ajit, Sameer and Atul
2010	Ringa Ringa	"Ghe Saawrun"	Ajay-Atul
2014	Raakhandaar	"Khandoba"	Kanak Raj
2015	Nagrik	"Bola Vitthal"	Tubbi Parik
2016	Lord of Shingnapur	"Deva Shani Deva"	Farhan Shaikh
2017	Bhikari	"Deva Ho Deva"	Milind Wankhede
2018	Raja	"Zannata"	Pankaj Padghan
2018	Patil	"Surya Thambala"	Dh Hrmony-SRM Alien
2019	Thackeray	"Saheb Tu Sarkar Tu"	Rohan-Rohan
2023	Surya	"Suryaa Suryaa"	Dev Chouhan
2024	Dharmaveer 2	"Asa Ha Dharmaveer"	Avinash–Vishwajeet

=== Punjabi songs ===
Year	Film	Songs	Composer(s)
2012	Rahe Chardi Kala Punjab Di	"Rahe Chardi Kala Punjab Di"	Surinder Bachan
2025	Akaal: The Unconquered	"Akaal – Title Track"	Shankar–Ehsaan–Loy

=== Urdu songs ===
Year	Film	Songs	Composer(s)
2016	Zindagi Kitni Haseen Hay	"Kitni Baar"	
2017	Mehrunisa V Lub U	"Tu Hi Tu"	Simaab Sen
2017	Mehrunisa V Lub U	"Badla"	Simaab Sen

=== Gujarati songs ===
Year	Film	Songs	Composer(s)
2026	Hip Hip Hurray	"Kar Taiyari"	Janki Gadhavi, Nishith Brahmbhatt

== Collaboration with musician and lyricist ==
Musician/Lyricist	Movie/Album/TV Shows	Remark
Gulzar	1) Dil Se.. – 1998 2) Khoobsurat – 1999 3) Aks – 2001 4) Bunty Aur Babli – 2005; 5) The Blue Umbrella – 2005 6) Paheli – 2005 7) Omkara – 2006 8) Jaan-E-Mann – 2006; 9) Jhoom Barabar Jhoom – 2007 10) No Smoking – 2007 11) Just Married – 2007; 12) Slumdog Millionaire – 2009 13) Billu – 2009 14) Firaaq – 2009 15) Kaminey – 2009; 16) Dus Tola – 2010 17) Veer – 2010 18) Raavan – 2010 19) Ishqiya – 2010; 20) Teen Thay Bhai – 2011 21) Chala Mussaddi... Office Office – 2011; 22) Motu Patlu – 2012 23) Matru Ki Bijlee Ka Mandola – 2013 24) Ek Thi Daayan – 2013; 25) Dedh Ishqiya – 2014 26) Haider – 2014 27) Kill Dil – 2014; 28) Madaari – 2016 29) Rangoon – 2017	
A.R. Rahman	1) Dil Se.. – 1998 2) 1947 Earth – 1998 3) Doli Saja Ke Rakhna – 1998; 4) Taal – 1999 5) Thakshak – 1999 6) Zubeidaa – 2000 7) One 2 Ka 4 – 2001; 8) Lagaan – 2001 9) The Legend of Bhagat Singh – 2002 10)Tehzeeb – 2003; 11) Meenaxi: A Tale of Three Cities – 2004 12) Bombay Dreams- 2004; 13) Mangal Pandey: The Rising – 2005 14) Water – 2005 15) Slumdog Millionaire – 2008; 16) Jaane Tu... Ya Jaane Na – 2008 17) Blue – 2009 18) Raavan – 2010; 19) Ada... A Way of Life – 2010 20) Connections – 2010 21) Raanjhanaa – 2013; 22) Million Dollar Arm – 2014 23) Jeans – 1998 24)Tamasha (2015) Sachin: A Billion Dreams – 2017	
Vishal Bhardwaj	1) Ramji Londonwale – 2005 2) The Blue Umbrella – 2005 3) Omkara – 2006; 4) No Smoking – 2007 5) Kaminey – 2009 6) Ishqiya – 2010; 7) Matru Ki Bijlee Ka Mandola – 2013 8) Dedh Ishqiya – 2014 9) Haider – 2014; 10) Motu Patlu: King of Kings – 2016 11) Madaari-2016 12) Rangoon-2017	
Vishal–Shekhar	1) Supari – 2003 2) Musafir – 2004 3) Dus −2005 4) Shabd – 2005; 5) Om Shanti Om – 2007 6) Tashan – 2008 7) Bhoothnath – 2008 8) Tees Maar Khan – 2010; 9) Ra.One – 2011 10) Kahaani- 2012 11) Arjun: The Warrior Prince – 2012 12) Gippi- 2013; 13) Gori Tere Pyaar Mein-2013 14) Happy New Year-2014 15)Sultan-2016	
Shankar–Ehsaan–Loy	1) Dus – 1997 (Unreleased) 2) Shool – 1999 3) Bunty Aur Babli-2005 4) Jhoom Barabar Jhoom-2007; 5) Johnny Gaddaar – 2007 6) Bhaag Milkha Bhaag-2013 7) D-Day – 2013 8) Kill Dil – 2014; 9) Dil Dhadakne Do – 2015	
Pritam	1) Ek Khiladi Ek Haseena – 2005 2) Garam Masala – 2005 3) Apna Sapna Money Money – 2006; 4) Just Married – 2007 5) Kaisay Kahein... – 2007 6) Kidnap – 2008 7) Ek : The Power of One – 2009; 8) Billu – 2009 9) Aakrosh – 2010 10) I Love NY – 2015	
Sajid–Wajid	1) Khauff – 2000 2) Garv: Pride and Honour – 2004 3) Veer – 2010 4) Dabangg – 2010; 5) Chala Mussaddi... Office Office – 2011 6) Housefull 2 – 2012 7) Ek Tha Tiger – 2012; 8) Dabangg 2 – 2012 9) Khallballi! – 2013 10) Rangrezz – 2013	
Nusrat Fateh Ali Khan	1) Kachche Dhaage – 1999	
Anand Bakshi	1) Banjaran – 1991 2) Saudagar – 1991; 3) Chamatkar – 1992 4) Rajkumar – 1996 5) Dil Kya Kare – 1999; 6) Hindustan Ki Kasam – 1999 7) Kachche Dhaage – 1999 8) Taal – 1999; 9) Yaadein – 2001 10) Na Tum Jaano Na Hum – 2002 11) Mehbooba – 2008; 12) Yamla Pagla Deewana – 2011	
Salim–Sulaiman	1) Iqbal – 2005 2) Aaja Nachle – 2007 3)Chak De! India – 2007; 4) Rab Ne Bana Di Jodi – 2008 5) Fashion – 2008 6) Kurbaan – 2009 7) Luck – 2009; 8) Band Baaja Baaraat – 2010 9)Chakravyuh – 2012 10) Kaanchi: The Unbreakable – 2014 11) Spin – 2021	
Amit Trivedi	1) Bombay Talkies – 2013	
Sameer	1) Kurbaan – 1991 2) Raghuveer – 1995 3) Kartavya – 1995 4) Itihaas – 1997; 5) Daag: The Fire – 1999 6) Biwi No.1 – 1999 7) Jaanwar – 1999; 8) Badal – 2000 9) Jungle – 2000 10) Deewane – 2000 11) Raja Ko Rani Se Pyar Ho Gaya – 2000; 12) Tera Mera Saath Rahen – 2001 13) Deewaanapan – 2001 14) The Legend of Bhagat Singh – 2002; 15) Karz: The Burden of Truth – 2002 16) Dum – 2003 17) Kash Aap Hamare Hote – 2003; 18) Kaise Kahoon Ke... Pyaar Hai – 2003 19) Tere Naam – 2003 20) Baghban – 2003; 21) Classic Dance of Love – 2005 22) Iqbal – 2005 23) Garam Masala – 2005; 24) Dosti: Friends Forever – 2005 25) c – 2008 26) Mr. Black Mr. White – 2008 27) Good Luck! – 2008; 28) Hari Puttar: A Comedy of Terrors – 2008 29) Chintu Ji – 2009 30) Na Jaane Kabse – 2011; 31) I Am Singh – 2011 32) Housefull 2 – 2012 33) Chakradhaar – 2012 34) Bol Bachchan – 2012; 35) Mere Dost Picture Abhi Baki Hai – 2012 36) Ata Pata Laapata – 2012 37) Dabangg 2 – 2012	
Anu Malik	1) Refugee – 2000 2) LOC Kargil – 2003 3) Aks – 2001 4) Jaan-E-Mann – 2006; 5) Garv – 2004 6) Victory – 2009 7) Sssshhh... – 2003 8) Shakti: The Power – 2002; 9) Yaadein – 2001 10) Good Luck! – 2008 11) Yamla Pagla Deewana – 2011 12)Hum To Mohabbat Karega; 13)Khauff (2000) 14) Badal (2000) 15) Biwi No. 1 (1999) 16) Angaaray – 1998; 17)Gundaraj – 1995 18)Chamatkar – 1992	
Lesle Lewis	1) Apna Asmaan – 2007	
Vinay Jaiswal	1) Deewaren – 2016	
Sachin–Jigar	1)Bhoomi – 2017	
Rajesh Roshan	1) Na Tum Jaano Na Hum – 2002 2) Moksha – 2001 3) Daag the fire – 1999; 4) Swarg Yahan Narak Yahan – 1991	
Mithoon	1)Shivaay – 2016	
Meet Bros	1)Zanjeer- 2013 2)Kya Super Kool Hai Hum – 2012	

Filmography
No.	Film	Character	Year
1	Kuchh Kariye	Rishi	2010

== Awards and nominations ==
Year	Award	Category	Song	Film	Result	Ref(s)
2014	National Film Awards	Best Male Playback Singer	"Bismil"	Haider	Won	
2010	Grammy Awards	Best Song for Visual Media (As a performer)	"Jai Ho"	Slumdog Millionaire	Won	
1998	Filmfare Awards	Best Male Playback Singer	"Chaiyya Chaiyya"	Dil Se..	Won	
1999	Filmfare Awards	Best Male Playback Singer	"Ramta Jogi"	Taal	Nominated	
2008	Filmfare Awards	Best Male Playback Singer	"Chak De India"	Chak De! India	Nominated	
2009	Filmfare Awards	Best Male Playback Singer	"Haule Haule"	Rab Ne Bana Di Jodi	Won	
2010	Filmfare Awards	Best Male Playback Singer	"Dhan Te Nan"	Kaminey	Nominated	
2000	International Indian Film Academy Awards (IIFA)	Best Male Playback Singer	"Ramta Jogi"	Taal	Nominated	
2008	International Indian Film Academy Awards (IIFA)	Best Male Playback Singer	"Chak De! India"	Chak De! India	Nominated	
2009	International Indian Film Academy Awards (IIFA)	Best Male Playback Singer	"Haule Haule"	Rab Ne Bana Di Jodi	Nominated	
2010	International Indian Film Academy Awards (IIFA)	Best Male Playback Singer	"Dhan Te Nan"	Kaminey	Nominated	
2015	International Indian Film Academy Awards (IIFA)	Best Male Playback Singer	"Bismil"	Haider	Nominated	
2019	International Indian Film Academy Awards (IIFA)	Best Male Playback Singer	"Kar Har Maidan Fateh"	Sanju	Nominated	
1999	Screen Awards	Best Male Playback	"Chaiyya Chaiyya"	Dil Se..	Won	<
2000	Screen Awards	Best Male Playback	"Ramta Jogi"	Taal	Won	
1999	Zee Cine Awards	Best Male Playback Singer	"Chaiyya Chaiyya"	Dil Se..	Won	
2003	Zee Cine Awards	Best Male Playback Singer	"Des Mere Des Mere"	The Legend of Bhagat Singh	Nominated	
2008	Zee Cine Awards	Best Male Playback Singer	"Chak De! India"	Chak De! India	Nominated	
2017	Zee Cine Awards	Best Male Playback Singer	"Sultan"	Sultan	Nominated	
2019	Zee Cine Awards	Best Male Playback Singer	"Kar Har Maidan Fateh"	Sanju	Nominated	
