= Ada... A Way of Life =

- Directed by: Tanvir Ahmad
- Written by: Tanvir Ahmad
- Produced by: Kazaan Ahmad
- Starring: Ayaan Ahmad; Rahul Roy; Ayesha Jhulka; Nauheed Cyrusi
- Cinematography: Nigam Bomzan
- Edited by: Tamal Chakraborty
- Music by: A. R. Rahman
- Production company: Mehboob Studio
- Release date: 31 December 2010
- Country: India
- Language: Hindi

Ada... A Way of Life (transl. Testimony) is a 2010 Hindi musical film written and directed by Tanvir Ahmad, with music by A. R. Rahman. Rahman composed the songs for Ada in 2001, after completing the score for Lagaan, but Ahmad's plans for the film were shelved. Though the music was composed for the original concept, the film features a new script as well as different actors, as it stars debuting actor Ayaan Ahmed, the director's son. Along with its notable composer, the soundtrack also features award-winning singer Jayachandran, contributing vocals for the first time to a Hindi language film.

The soundtrack was released on 20 May 2008. The film was scheduled to be released on 31 December 2009 but released a year later on 31 December 2010.

== Plot ==
The director, Tanvir Ahmed, describes this film as "a tale of a noble father, a religious mother and a gangster son in Mumbai City".

It is the tale of Ayaan, son of the noble Anil Anand, and the spiritual Aamina. Ayaan's world is turned upside down when Anil starts receiving death threats if he goes ahead with his testimony against some criminals.

The murder of his father sets Ayaan on a course of revenge and killing against the criminals of Mumbai, as he becomes a contract killer.

== Cast ==
- Ayaan Ahmad as Ayaan Anand
- Rahul Roy as Professor Anil Anand
- Ayesha Jhulka as Amina Anand
- Nauheed Cyrusi as Gul
- Milind Gunaji as D'Costa
- Saurabh Dubey as Akrambhai

== Promotion ==
To promote the film, Nokia and Big Music combined to launch a contest allowing contributors to remix two of the soundtrack songs, the winner of which—selected by Rahman—will have the opportunity to work with Rahman in the composer's studio. In support of the unusual promotion, Nokia launched its Nokia XpressMusic mixer, a positioning strategy not only to promote the film but also Nokia's music phones in advance of the launch of the Nokia MusicStore.

== Soundtrack ==
Ada... A Way of Life

Soundtrack album by A. R. Rahman
- Released: 20 May 2008
- Recorded: Panchathan Record Inn; A.M. Studios
- Genre: Film soundtrack
- Length: 45:40
- Labels: T-Series & Big Music
- Producer: A. R. Rahman

A. R. Rahman chronology
Jodhaa Akbar (2008)	Ada... A Way of Life (2008)	Jaane Tu... Ya Jaane Na (2008)

The soundtrack features 10 songs, composed by A. R. Rahman, with lyrics penned by Nusrat Badr and Raqeeb Alam. The album was released in India on 20 May 2008 by Big Music, two years before the release of the film.

The soundtrack received generally favorable reviews from critics. It got an 8.5/10 rating on PlanetBollywood.com, 8.25/10 on Music Aloud, and 3/5 on Bollywood Hungama.

Lyrics by Nusrat Badr except where noted

No.	Title	Lyrics	Singer(s)	Length
1.	"Gulfisha"		Sonu Nigam, Sunidhi Chauhan	4:44
2.	"Gum Sum"		Alka Yagnik, Sonu Nigam	4:20
3.	"Hai Dard"		Udit Narayan	4:56
4.	"Hawa Sun Hawa"		Alka Yagnik, Sonu Nigam	6:02
5.	"Ishq Ada" (Female Version)	Raqeeb Alam	Parul Mishra	3:48
6.	"Ishq Ada" (Male Version)	Raqeeb Alam	Rashid Ali	3:38
7.	"Meherbaan"		A. R. Rahman, Sanjeev Thomas	3:51
8.	"Meherbaan" (Instrumental)		A. R. Rahman	3:02
9.	"Milo Wahan Wahan"		Alka Yagnik, Jayachandran	6:24
10.	"Tu Mera Hai"		K. S. Chithra, Sukhwinder Singh, Naresh Iyer	4:58
Total length:				45:40
