= M. F. Husain =

Indian artist (1915–2011)

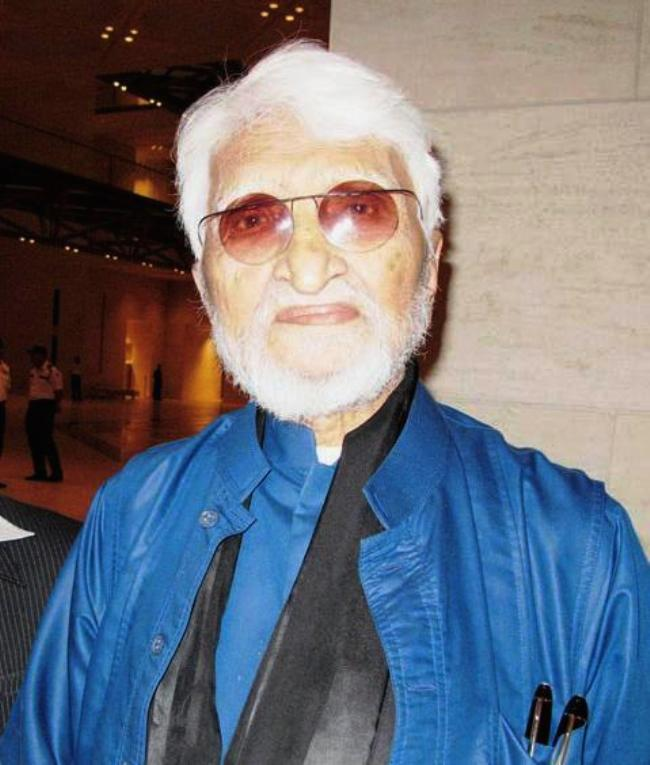
- Husain in 2010
- Born: Maqbool Fida Husain; 17 September 1915; Pandharpur, Bombay Presidency, British India
- Died: 9 June 2011 (aged 95); London, England
- Education: Sir J. J. School of Art
- Known for: Painting
- Notable work: Meenaxi: A Tale of Three Cities; Through the Eyes of a Painter
- Movement: Bombay Progressive Artists' Group
- Spouse: Fazila Bibi (m. 1941; died 1998)
- Children: 6, including Owais Husain and Shamshad Hussain
- Awards: Padma Bhushan (1973); Padma Vibhushan (1991)

Member of Parliament Rajya Sabha
- In office 12 May 1986 – 11 May 1992

Maqbool Fida Husain (17 September 1915 – 9 June 2011) was an Indian painter and film director who painted narrative paintings in a modified Cubist style. One of the founding members of Bombay Progressive Artists' Group, Husain is associated with Indian modernism in the 1940s. His early association with the Bombay Progressive Artists' Group used modern technique, and was inspired by the "new" India after the partition of 1947. His narrative paintings, executed in a modified Cubist style, can be caustic and funny as well as serious and sombre. His themes—sometimes treated in series—included topics as diverse as Gandhi, Mother Teresa, the Ramayana, the Mahabharata, the British Raj, and motifs of Indian urban and rural life. In September 2020, his painting titled Voices, auctioned for a record $2.5 million.

Husain's later works have stirred controversy, which included nude portrayals of Hindu deities, and a nude portrayal of Bharat Mata. Right-wing organisations called for his arrest, and several lawsuits were filed against him for hurting religious sentiments. He remained in a self imposed exile from 2006 until his death in 2011, accepting Qatari citizenship in 2010.

In 1967, he received the National Film Award for Best Experimental Film for Through the Eyes of a Painter. In 2004, he directed Meenaxi: A Tale of Three Cities, a film he worked on with his artist son Owais Husain, which was screened in the Marché du film section of the 2004 Cannes Film Festival.

== Biography ==
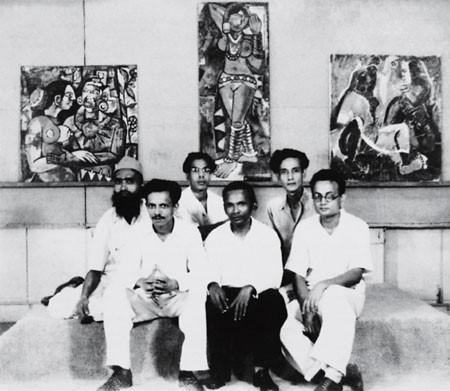
Husain (first from left) with the other members of the Bombay Progressive Artists Group

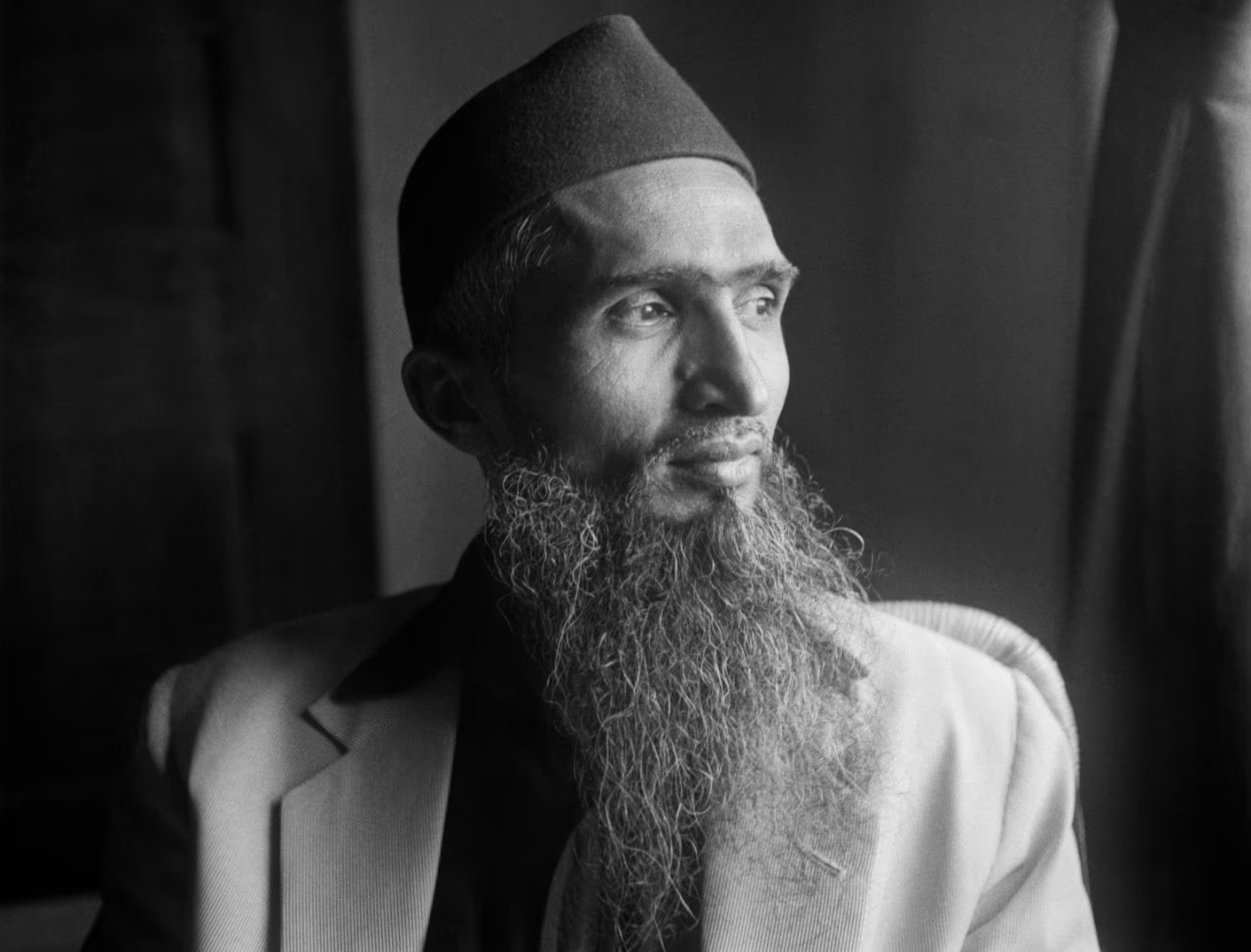
M. F. Husain in 1956

Maqbool Fida Husain was born on 17 September 1915 in Pandharpur, Bombay Province (present-day Maharashtra) in a Suleymani Bohra family. He picked up taste in art through studying calligraphy while he stayed at a Madrasa in Baroda. Husain attended the Sir Jamsetjee Jeejebhoy School of Art in Mumbai but couldn't finish his schooling. Early in his career, Husain painted cinema posters in Mumbai. To earn additional income, he worked for a toy company designing and building toys. He often travelled to Gujarat to paint landscapes whenever he could afford to travel.

Husain developed his painting skills in the 1930s, painting billboards for the growing Bollywood film industry. This was a clique of young artists who wished to break with the nationalist traditions established by the Bengal school of art and to encourage an Indian avant-garde, engaged at an international level. In 1934, he sold his first painting for 10 rupees on the roadside. Husain's father, who was an accountant, wanted him to get into business.

The artists cite "The Partition" of India and Pakistan 14 August 1947, with its resulting religious rioting and heavy loss of life as their reason for forming The Progressive Artist's Group in Bombay in December 1947. The artists saw the Partition as a "turning point" for India, and their new style of art was urged on by, and was also a turning point for, (modern) Indian Art. Husain's first solo art exhibition was in 1952 in Zürich. His first U.S. exhibit was at India House in New York City in 1964.

Husain was a special invitee along with Pablo Picasso at the São Paulo Biennial, Brazil in 1971. He was nominated to the Rajya Sabha in 1986. He married Fazila Bibi (d. 1998) in 1941, they had six children: four sons (including artists Shamshad and Owais) and two daughters – Raisa, his muse and an actress and costume designer in his films and Aqueela, his muse.

=== 1990–2005 ===
Although he was raised in a Muslim household, Husain sought freedom to capture the essence of beauty in other religious cultures, for which he received a backlash. His paintings allegedly hurt the religious sentiments of Hindus, which beginning in the 1990s mounted a campaign of protest against him. The paintings in question were created in 1970, but did not become an issue until 1996, when they were printed in Vichar Mimansa, a Hindi monthly magazine, which published them in an article headlined "M.F. Husain: A Painter or Butcher". In response, eight criminal complaints were filed against him. In 2004, Delhi High Court dismissed these complaints of "promoting enmity between different groups ... by painting Hindu goddesses – Durga and Sarswati, that was later compromised by Hindu fundamentalist groups." In 1998 Husain's house was attacked by Hindu fundamentalist groups like Bajrang Dal and art works were vandalised. The leadership of another fundamentalist political party Shiv Sena endorsed the attack. Twenty-six Bajrang Dal activists were arrested by the police. Protests against Husain also led to the closure of an exhibition in England.

He appeared in a scene in film Mohabbat, which had Madhuri Dixit in lead role (who was his muse and the subject of a series of his paintings which he signed Fida). In the film, the paintings that were supposedly done by Madhuri were actually Husain's. He has also directed several films, including Gaja Gamini (2000). The film was intended as a tribute to Ms. Dixit herself. In this film she can be seen portraying various forms and manifestations of womanhood including the muse of Kalidasa, the Mona Lisa, a rebel, and musical euphoria. He went on to make Meenaxi: A Tale of Three Cities (with Tabu). The film was pulled out of cinemas a day after some Muslim organisations raised objections to one of the songs in it. The All-India Ulema Council complained that the Qawwali song "Noor-un-Ala-Noor" was blasphemous. It argued that the song contained words directly taken from the Quran. The council was supported by Muslim organisations like the Milli Council, All-India Muslim Council, Raza Academy, Jamiat-ul-Ulema-e-Hind and Jamat-e-Islami. Husain's son stated that the words were a phrase referring to divine beauty that were being sung by the central character played by Tabu. He said there was no intention to offend. Following the wave of protests the enraged artist withdrew his movie from cinemas. The film was well received by the critics, however, and went on to win various awards.

=== 2006–2011 ===
In February 2006, Husain was charged with "hurting sentiments of people" because of his nude portraits of Hindu gods and goddesses. In addition, on 6 February 2006 issue, India Today, a national English weekly published an advertisement titled "Art For Mission Kashmir". This advertisement contains a painting of {Bharatmata} (Mother India) as a nude woman posed across a map of India with the names of Indian States on various parts of her body. The exhibition was organised by Nafisa Ali of Action India – an (NGO) and Apparao Art Gallery. Organisations like VHP protested persistently against Husain displaying the painting on the websites and even in exhibitions in north Europe. As a result, Husain apologised and promised to withdraw the painting from an auction, though it later sold for Rs 80 lakh. The painting later appeared on Husain's official website. Husain claims that the loss of his mother at the age of a year and a half is a possible reason for his pattern of paintings depicting a maternal Indian figure.

Husain became the best-paid painter in India, his highest-selling piece fetching $1.6 million at a 2008 Christie's auction.

Hundreds of lawsuits in connection with Husain's allegedly obscene art were outstanding as of 2007. A warrant was issued for his arrest after he did not appear at a hearing, though this warrant was later suspended.

Husain lived in self-imposed exile from 2006 until his death. He generally lived in Doha and summered in London. For the last years of his life Husain lived in Doha and London, staying away from India, but expressing a strong desire to return, despite fears of being prosecuted.

In 2008 Husain was commissioned to create 32 large-scale paintings of Indian history. He finished 8 before his death. In 2010, he was conferred Qatari citizenship, and surrendered his Indian passport; though he still held an Overseas Citizenship of India. In Qatar, he principally worked on two large projects, one on the history of Arab civilisation, commissioned by Qatar's first lady, Mozah bint Nasser Al Missned, and one on the history of Indian civilisation. The works are to be housed in a museum in Doha.

At the age of 92 Husain was given the prestigious Raja Ravi Varma award (Raja Ravi Varma Puraskaram) by the government of Kerala. The announcement led to controversy in Kerala and some cultural organisations campaigned against the granting of the award and petitioned the Kerala courts. Social Activist, Rahul Easwar, went to Kerala High Court and it granted an interim order to stay the granting of the award until the petition had been disposed of.

In 2010, the Jordanian Royal Islamic Strategic Studies Centre named Husain as one of the 500 most influential Muslims.

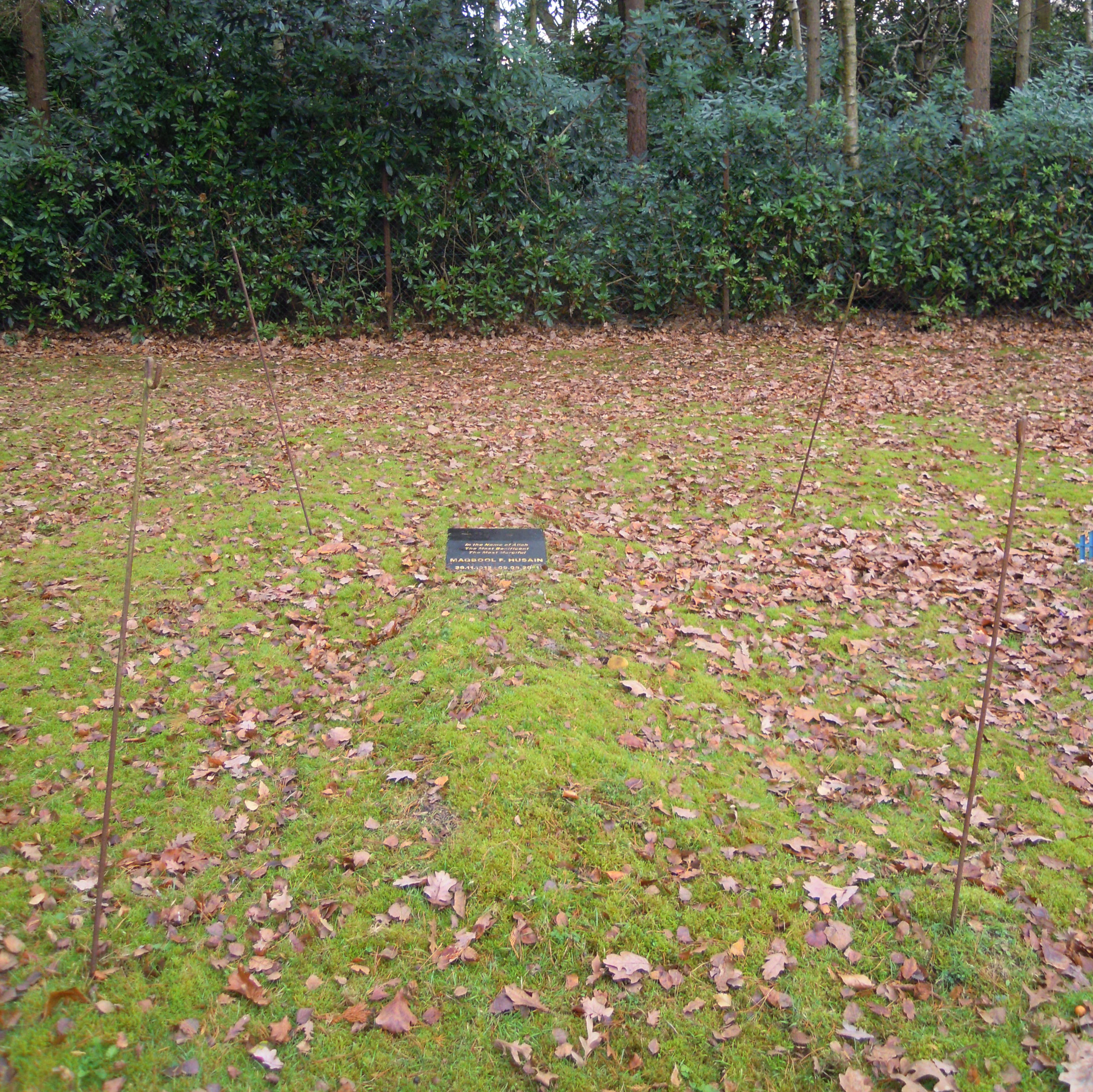
Grave of M. F. Husain in Brookwood Cemetery in Surrey, England.

Husain died, aged 95, on 9 June 2011, following a heart attack. He had been unwell for several months. He died at the Royal Brompton Hospital in London, and was buried in Brookwood Cemetery on 10 June 2011.

Other Indian artists expressed criticism. Satish Gujral publicly asked Husain whether he would dare to portray Islamic figures similarly. However Gujral stated that he deeply regretted the way Husain was treated and forced into an exile because of what Gujral termed "the mob culture". And Harsh Goenka, a Mumbai-based industrialist, claims that forcing Husain into exile "is, in a way, showing the weakness of the system, that we cannot protect the rights of the citizen".

Writing in The Pioneer, Chandan Mitra wrote, "As long as such a law exists in the statutes, nobody can be faulted for approaching the courts against Husain's objectionable paintings, nor can the judiciary be pilloried for ordering action against the artist for his persistent and deliberate refusal to appear before the court."

In response to the controversy, Husain's admirers petitioned the government to grant Husain the Bharat Ratna, India's highest award. According to Shashi Tharoor, who supported the petition, it praised Husain because his "life and work are beginning to serve as an allegory for the changing modalities of the secular in modern India – and the challenges that the narrative of the nation holds for many of us. This is the opportune and crucial time to honour him for his dedication and courage to the cultural renaissance of his beloved country." Husain had such a vast amount of work that spanned over 10 decades producing roughly 40,000 paintings by the end of his lifetime.

On his part Husain stated that leading Hindu leaders have not spoken a word against his paintings, and they should have been the first ones to have raised their voice and only people with political intentions created controversy.

After Husain's death, Shiv Sena chief Bal Thackeray said, "He only slipped up on the depiction of Hindu gods and goddesses. Otherwise, he was happy and content in his field. If his demise is a loss for modern art, then so be it. May Allah give him peace!"

== Awards and honours ==
- Padma Shri in 1966, Government of India.
- Padma Bhushan in 1973, Government of India.
- Padma Vibhushan in 1991, Government of India.
- Raja Ravi Varma Award in 2007, Government of Kerala.
- Honorary Doctorates from Banaras Hindu University, Jamia Millia Islamia, University of Calicut (2003) and University of Mysore.
- National Art Award in 2004, Lalit Kala Akademi, New Delhi.
- Aditya Vikram Birla ‘Kalashikkar’ Award in 1997 for Lifetime Achievement.
- National Film Award for Best Experimental Film for Through the Eyes of a Painter, in 1968 India.
- Golden Bear short film award for his film Through the Eyes of a Painter at Berlin International Film Festival in 1967 and purchased by Museum of Modern Art (MOMA), New York City.
- International Biennale Award in 1959, Tokyo.
- First Prize at the National Exhibition of Art in 1955, Lalit Kala Akademi, New Delhi.
- Bombay Art Society in 1947, Mumbai.

== Filmography ==
Year	Title	Credited as				
Year	Title	Director	Writer	Actor	Lyricist	Notes
1967	Through the Eyes of a Painter	Yes	Yes			Short film; also cinematographer
1997	Mohabbat			Yes		
2000	Gaja Gamini	Yes	Yes	Yes	Yes	
2004	Meenaxi: Tale of Three Cities	Yes	Yes		Yes	Also producer
2012	Pehla Sitara		Dialogues			Additional dialogues only

== Legacy ==
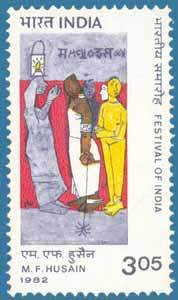
Hussain Painting on Indian Postage stamp, 1982

Indian film director Santi P. Choudhury made Husain, a documentary film on his life in 1980. Choudhury had earlier made another documentary on the artist, A Painter Of Our Time: Hussain, in 1976. Both of these were produced by the Government of India's Films Division, for whom Husain himself had earlier made the film Through the Eyes of a Painter.

On 17 September 2015, search engine Google commemorated M. F. Husain with a Doodle on his birth centenary.

A cyclostyled document titled ‘Ghalib Academy: A Lasting Memorial’ from 31 January 1970 lists the following artists in the collection: M. F. Husain, Jayant Parikh, Nirode Mazumdar, KS Kulkarni, Paritosh Sen, GR Santosh, Rathin Mitra, Laxman Pai, A Ramachandran, Reddeppa Naidu, Biren De, J Sultan Ali, YK Shukla, K Sreenivasulu, Shiavax Chavda and Anis Farooqi.

In 2025, Lawh Wa Qalam, museum dedicated to MF Husain was opened in Doha's Education City with the support of Qatar Foundation. The architecture of the museum's building is inspired by scetches made by MF Husain himself. It is said that the creation of the museum was a promise made to Husain before his death by his friend and patron Moza bint Nasser, chair of the Qatar Foundation and mother of current Qatari emir Tamim bin Hamad Al Thani.

On October 17–18, 2026, the ShowKeen Hyderabad exhibition by AstaGuru featured a curated selection of modern and contemporary Indian artists, including modern and established masters Amrita Sher-Gil, M. F. Husain, S. H. Raza, Jayant Parikh, K. H. Ara, Krishen Khanna, Ram Kumar, and many more.

== See also ==
- Bombay Progressive Artists' Group
- Cubism
- Expressionism
- Bengal School of Art
