= Thoda Hai Thode Ki Zaroorat Hai =

- Created by: Suchitra Home Entertainment
- Directed by: Ravi Ray
- Starring: see below
- Opening theme: "Thoda Hai Thode Ki Zaroorat Hai" by
- Country of origin: India
- No. of episodes: Total 104

Production
- Producer: Anand Rai
- Running time: approx. 23 minutes

Original release
- Network: Sony TV
- Release: 1997 – 1999

Thoda Hai Thode Ki Zaroorat Hai was an Indian soap opera that aired in 1997. The director Ravi Rai won numerous awards for the serial, and the series itself won the 'Best Television Serial Drama' award by Screen Awards in the year 1997. The story shows how hard it is for us humans to survive the death of our loved ones.

== Cast ==
- Sachin Khedekar...Vishal
- Prajakti Deshmukh... Kavita
- Alok Nath
- Rita Bhaduri as Chandrima bhaduri's daughter
- Simone Singh ... Chandni
- Mahesh Thakur
- Akshay Anand
- Masumeh Makhija... Uma
- Shruti Ulfat
- Raju Kher ***Anupam Kher's brother
- Nandita Puri... Neena
