= Meenaxi: Tale of Three Cities =

- Directed by: M. F. Husain
- Written by: Story & Dialogue: M. F. Husain; Owais Husain
- Screenplay by: Owais Husain
- Produced by: Reima Husain; Faiza Husain
- Starring: Tabu; Raghubir Yadav; Nadira Babbar; Kunal Kapoor
- Cinematography: Santosh Sivan
- Edited by: A. Sreekar Prasad
- Music by: A. R. Rahman
- Distributed by: Yash Raj Films
- Release date: 2 April 2004
- Country: India
- Language: Hindi

Meenaxi: Tale of Three Cities (or Meenaxi) is a 2004 Indian Hindi-language musical drama film directed by M. F. Husain starring Tabu, Raghubir Yadav, Nadira Babbar and Kunal Kapoor. The film is centered on Hyderabad novelist Nawab (Yadav) who is suffering from writer's block. After five years and no stories, Nawab comes across an unconventional muse, Meenaxi (Tabu). The three cities referred to in the title are Hyderabad, Jaisalmer and Prague. The film features a score and soundtrack by A. R. Rahman.

It is semi-autobiographical in some aspects. There are allusions to Husain's own experiences with his muse, Madhuri Dixit, with whom he made his previous film, Gaja Gamini (2000). The film was screened in the Marché du Film section of the 2005 Cannes Film Festival.

== Synopsis ==
The story follows Nawab, a popular Hyderabadi novelist, who is suffering from a classic case of writer's block. Five years have passed, and stories of substance seem to have dried up. Then, almost providentially, Nawab comes across a young woman named Meenaxi. She's enigmatic and individualistic – and not quite willing to perform the part of a passive muse. But that doesn't deter a rejuvenated Nawab from giving her different personae – she can be the mysterious perfume trader of Hyderabad, the exotic desert bloom of Jaisalmer or the orphaned Maria of Prague. Inexorably, she consolidates her command over the novelist. She dismisses his renewed attempts at writing as insubstantial and hackneyed, plunging him into a state of deeper despair. She is scathingly critical about his story and is amused by one of his characters, the lovelorn and awkward Kameshwar. Finally, as Nawab strives on a new page all over again, Meenaxi comments that perhaps the book is in vain. In any case, it is much too late. The writer must survive and live, if he can, without her support, inspiration and criticism.

== Cast ==
- Tabu in a triple role as
  - Meenaxi
  - Tanu
  - Maria Zarkova
- Raghubir Yadav as Nawab
- Nadira Babbar as Khala / Masi
- Kunal Kapoor as Kameshwar Mathur
- Sadiya Turabi as Naghma
- Zainab Ravdjee as Naghma's friend
- Sharat Saxena as Maharawal
- Bharat Kapoor as Masa
- Remo D'Souza as Kameshwar's friend
- Sagar Ishan Arya as Karanveer

== Soundtrack ==
Meenaxi: A Tale of Three Cities

Soundtrack album by A. R. Rahman
- Released: 3 January 2004 (India)
- Recorded: Panchathan Record Inn
- Genre: World
- Length: 39:52
- Label: Sony BMG
- Producer: A. R. Rahman

A. R. Rahman chronology
Udhaya (2004)	Meenaxi: A Tale of Three Cities (2004)	New (2004)

A. R. Rahman composed music for the film, with lyrics written by Rahat Indori, M. F. Husain, and Sukhwinder Singh. The music for Meenaxi was released on 3 January 2004, generating controversies for the song "Noor-Un-Ala" which had lyrics from the Quran. The song "Noor-Un-Ala-Noor" is a Sufi style song sung by Murtaza Khan and Qadir Khan, together called Khan brothers. Lyrics for the song were by M. F. Hussain which slightly adapted the Quranic verses honouring Allah to honour the lead character Meenaxi.

The audio was released on 3 January 2004 creating controversy regarding the song "Noor-Un-Ala" which had lyrics directly taken from the Quran. The film was pulled from cinemas a day after some Muslim organisations raised objections to the song.

Professional ratings
Review scores
Source	Rating
Bollywood Hungama	3/5 stars

=== Track listing ===
Track #	Song	Singer(s)	Lyrics	Length	Notes
1	"Yeh Rishta"	Reena Bhardwaj	Rahat Indori	4:40	Strings by John Themis; Reused in Sakkarakatti as "Naan Eppodhu"
2	"Chinnamma Chilakkamma"	Sukhwinder Singh	Sukhwinder Singh	5:45	Reused in Sakkarakatti as "Chinnamma Chilakkamma"; Partly sung in Telugu by Ganga, Febi, Kanchana, A. R. Reihana
3	"Do Kadam"	Sonu Nigam	Rahat Indori	5:58	Strings by Rashid Ali; Flute by Naveen Kumar
4	"Dhuan Dhuan"	Asha Bhonsle	Rahat Indori	5:42	Additional vocals by Kunal Ganjawala; Percussions by Sivamani; Additional Grooves by James Asher
5	"Rang Hai"	Alka Yagnik	Rahat Indori	5:21	Additional Vocals by Dallinda; Percussions by Hossam Ramzy
6	"Noor-Un-Ala-Noor"	Murtuza Khan, Qadir Khan	M. F. Husain	6:55	
7	"Cyclist's Rhythm"	Instrumental		3:01	Percussions by Sivamani; Flute by Naveen Kumar
8	"Potter's Village"	Instrumental		2:28	Percussions by Hossam Ramzy; Strings by John Themis

== Reception ==
Ronjita Kulkarni of Rediff.com called the film "poetry in colour", and praised Tabu's performance, writing, "Tabu is brilliant. The way she teases the two men in the film is spectacular. She is aided, of course, by Husain's knack of presenting his women beautifully, like he did to Madhuri Dixit in Gaja Gamini." Derek Elley of Variety wrote, "Painter-cum-filmmaker M.F. Husain lets palette take precedence over plotting in “Meenaxi: Tale of 3 Cities,” a beautifully lensed tale of a writer bewitched by a female muse that desperately needs a more solid script. An artier, free-form take on Bollywood formulae, this showcase for actress Tabu (niece of veteran thesp Shabana Azmi) could find a niche offshore on the strength of its visuals and the varied score by composer du jour A.R. Rahman, though wider dissemination will be on ancillary." Manish Gajjar of BBC.com wrote that the film "will appeal to those who appreciate art. It is definitely not one of your run of the mill Bollywood's masala films."

== Awards ==
- 2003: National Film Awards:
  - Best Production Design: Sharmishta Roy
- 2005: Zee Cine Awards
  - Best Art Direction: Sharmishta Roy
  - Best Cinematography: Santosh Sivan
