= One Love (A. R. Rahman song) =

Single by A. R. Rahman

from the album One Love
- Released: 2007
- Recorded: 2007; Panchathan Record Inn and AM Studios (Chennai, India)
- Genre: World Music
- Length: 4:22
- Label: EMI Music
- Songwriters: A. R. Rahman, Raqeeb Alam, Rajeev Alunkal (Malayalam)
- Producer: A. R. Rahman

"One Love" (alternately titled "One Love - Taj Anthem" or "Taj Anthem") is a single by Indian composer A.R. Rahman, which was made to commemorate the beauty of Taj Mahal and celebrate its status as one of the Seven Wonders of the World. The official track list consists of six versions of the track "One Love" rendered in six different languages, Kannada, Tamil, Hindi, Malayalam, Telugu and Bengali. All the versions were sung by A. R. Rahman, Karthik and Naresh Iyer.

== Track listing ==
Track #	Song	Language
1	One Love - Kaadal Ondrallava	Tamil
2	One Love - Ek Mohabbat	Hindi
3	One Love - Sneham Eegamayam	Malayalam
4	One Love - Prema Okkatega	Telugu
5	One Love - Premavu Illi Onde	Kannada
6	One Love - Bhalobasha Ek Hoye	Bengali

== Personnel ==
- A. R. Rahman – Vocals (Hindi, Kannada, Telugu and Tamil)
- Naresh Iyer – Vocals (Bengali and Malayalam)
- Karthik – Additional vocals
- Raqueeb Alam – Lyrics (Hindi & Bengali)
- K. Kalyan - Lyrics (Kannada)
- Rajeev Alunkal - Lyrics (Malayalam)
- Rajshri Sudhakar - Lyrics (Telugu)
- Mashook Rahman - Lyrics (Tamil)
