= Islam in Punjab, India =

- Rauza Sharif in Sirhind, Fatehgarh Sahib district

Total population
- c. 535,489 (~2% of the state population)

Regions with significant populations
- Malerkotla, Qadian, Ludhiana, Amritsar

Religions
- Islam Sunni's • Shia's • Ahmadiyya

Languages
- Punjabi, Hindustani (Hindi-Urdu)

Islam is a minority religion in Punjab, India followed by 535,489 people constituting about 1.93% of the state population out of 27.7 million population as of 2011 census report.

Islam has a strong historical presence in Punjab with many mosques, mausoleums and shrines. According to the 1941 census, Punjabi Muslims constituted approximately 38.4 percent of the population in the region that comprises the contemporary state of Punjab, India. (Note: 1941 figure taken from census data by combining the total population of all districts (Jalandhar, Ludhiana, Firozpur, Amritsar, Hoshiarpur, and Gurdaspur (minus Shakargarh Tehsil)), and princely states (Kapurthala, Malerkotla, Faridkot, Patiala, and Nabha) which are in the region that comprises the contemporary state of Punjab, India. See 1941 census data here:) With violence and religious cleansing accompanying the Partition of Punjab in 1947, the vast majority departed the region en masse, migrating westward to the region of Punjab that would fall on the western side of the Radcliffe Line, in the contemporary state of Punjab, Pakistan.

In the current era, much of the Muslim population of Punjab consists of migrants from Uttar Pradesh, Jammu and Kashmir, Rajasthan, Delhi and Bihar etc. The native Punjabi Muslims predominantly resides in Malerkotla district and Qadian town and others are found in major cities such as Mumbai, New Delhi and Kolkata.

== History ==
Muslim Population in Punjab, India
Year	Pop.	±% p.a.
1881	2,440,888	—
1901	2,898,114	+0.86%
1911	2,515,774	−1.40%
1921	2,686,598	+0.66%
1931	3,072,619	+1.35%
1941	3,748,410	+2.01%
1947	90,172	−46.27%
1951	110,160	+5.13%
1961	181,234	+5.10%
1971	252,688	+3.38%
1981	321,287	+2.43%
1991	390,077	+1.96%
2001	382,045	−0.21%
2011	535,489	+3.43%
Source: Census of India (Note: 1881 figure taken from census data by combining the total population of all districts (Jalandhar, Ludhiana, Firozpur, Amritsar, Hoshiarpur, and Gurdaspur (minus Shakargarh Tehsil)), and princely states (Kapurthala, Malerkotla, Faridkot, Patiala, and Nabha) which are in the region that comprises the contemporary state of Punjab, India. See 1881 census data here:) (Note: 1901 figure taken from census data by combining the total population of all districts (Jalandhar, Ludhiana, Firozpur, Amritsar, Hoshiarpur, and Gurdaspur (minus Shakargarh Tehsil)), and princely states (Kapurthala, Malerkotla, Faridkot, Patiala, and Nabha) which are in the region that comprises the contemporary state of Punjab, India. See 1901 census data here:) (Note: 1911 figure taken from census data by combining the total population of all districts (Jalandhar, Ludhiana, Firozpur, Amritsar, Hoshiarpur, and Gurdaspur (minus Shakargarh Tehsil)), and princely states (Kapurthala, Malerkotla, Faridkot, Patiala, and Nabha) which are in the region that comprises the contemporary state of Punjab, India. See 1911 census data here:) (Note: 1921 figure taken from census data by combining the total population of all districts (Jalandhar, Ludhiana, Firozpur, Amritsar, Hoshiarpur, and Gurdaspur (minus Shakargarh Tehsil)), and princely states (Kapurthala, Malerkotla, Faridkot, Patiala, and Nabha) which are in the region that comprises the contemporary state of Punjab, India. See 1921 census data here:) (Note: 1931 figure taken from census data by combining the total population of all districts (Jalandhar, Ludhiana, Firozpur, Amritsar, Hoshiarpur, and Gurdaspur (minus Shakargarh Tehsil)), and princely states (Kapurthala, Malerkotla, Faridkot, Patiala, and Nabha) which are in the region that comprises the contemporary state of Punjab, India. See 1931 census data here:)

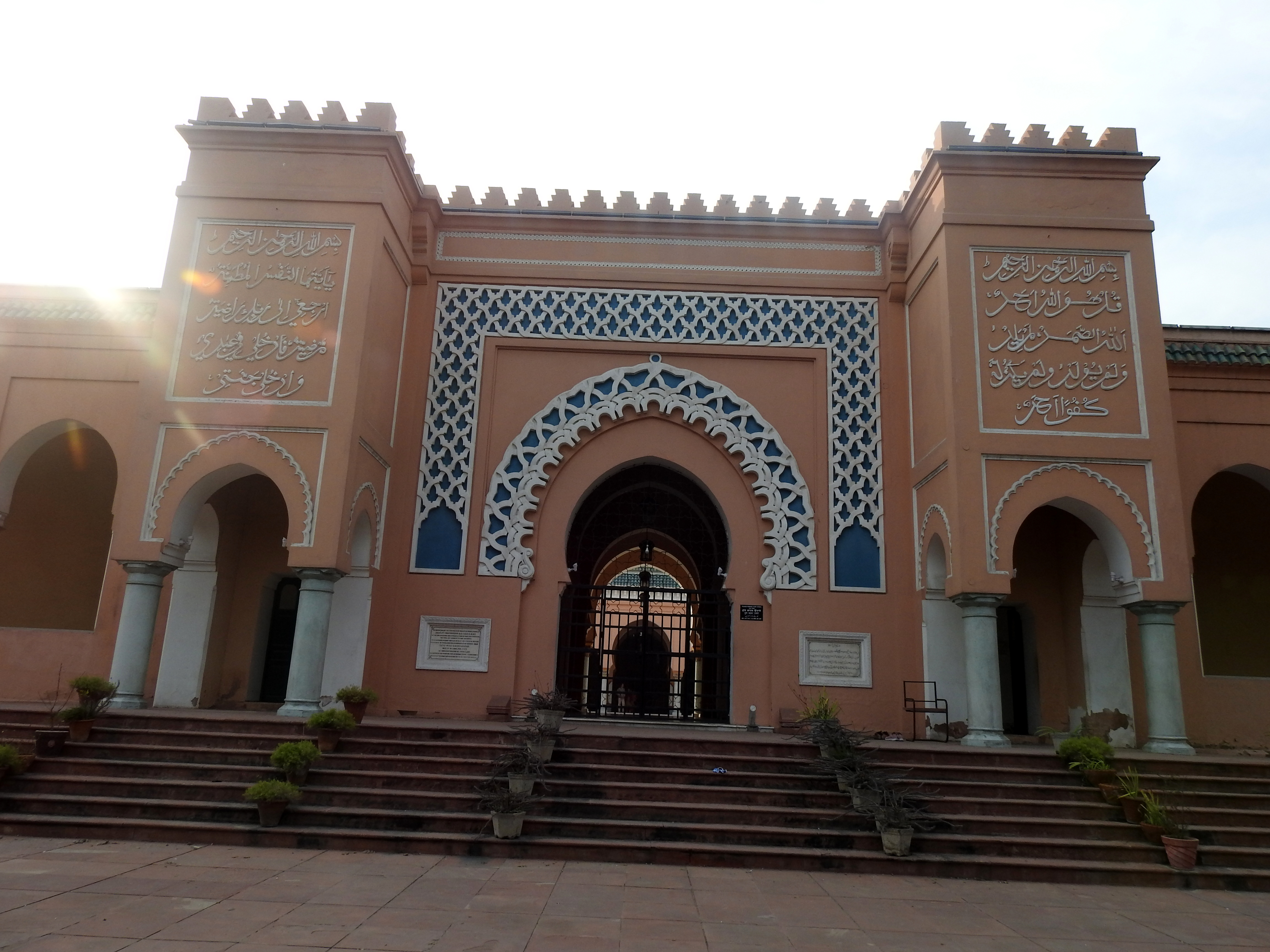
A photo of the Moorish Mosque in Kapurthala, India

Islam first arrived in the Punjab region following the conquest of Sindh by Muhammad bin Qasim in 712. The first permanent Muslim conquest of the Punjab was carried out by Mahmud Ghaznavi who made the whole of the Punjab a province of his empire with the headquarters at Lahore.

When the Ghaznavid Empire began to decline, the region was conquered by Muhammad Ghori. The conquest by Muhammad Ghori inaugurated a period of Muslim rule which lasted until the 18th century. The Mughals made most of East Punjab a part of the governorate of Sirhind.

The founder of the Ahmadiyya movement, Mirza Ghulam Ahmad, was born in Qadian, East Punjab in 1835.

According to the 1941 census, Muslims constituted approximately 38.4 percent of the population in the region that comprises the contemporary state of Punjab, India, numbering around 3.75 million persons. Following the Partition of Punjab, the population declined to 90,000 or 0.5% due to ethnic cleansing and large-scale mass migration of 3.66 million Muslims to Punjab, Pakistan in the violent events that have occurred during Partition.

Today, Muslims are scattered across East Punjab with small concentrations in the cities of Chandigarh, Hoshiarpur, Ludhiana, Malerkotla and Qadian. Malerkotla is the only municipality in Indian Punjab that has a Muslim majority. The migrant Uttar Pradeshi Muslims and Bihari Muslims labourers living in industrial city of Ludhiana, Patiala and Jalandhar forms a large proportion of the Muslim population in the state.

== Geographical distribution ==
=== Colonial era ===
Muslims in the administrative divisions that compose the contemporary Punjab State, India region (1881–1941)
District or Princely State	1881		1901		1911		1921		1931		1941	
District or Princely State	Pop.	%	Pop.	%	Pop.	%	Pop.	%	Pop.	%	Pop.	%
Amritsar district	413,207	46.26%	474,976	46.39%	408,882	46.43%	423,724	45.59%	524,676	46.97%	657,695	46.52%
Jalandhar district	358,601	45.42%	421,011	45.88%	357,051	44.52%	366,586	44.57%	419,556	44.46%	509,804	45.23%
Patiala State	321,354	21.9%	357,334	22.38%	307,384	21.84%	330,341	22.03%	363,920	22.39%	436,539	22.55%
Firozpur district	310,552	47.74%	447,615	46.72%	418,553	43.61%	482,540	43.94%	515,430	44.56%	641,448	45.07%
Hoshiarpur district	290,193	32.19%	312,958	31.62%	281,805	30.68%	289,298	31.19%	328,078	31.78%	380,759	32.53%
Gurdaspur district (Note: Does not include Shakargarh Tehsil, which was awarded to Pakistan as part of the Radcliffe Line.)	286,224	47.37%	348,182	49.33%	304,860	48.67%	316,709	49.54%	367,388	50.78%	440,323	51.08%
Ludhiana district	213,954	34.57%	235,937	35.05%	176,043	34.04%	192,961	33.99%	235,598	35.03%	302,482	36.95%
Kapurthala State	142,974	56.6%	178,326	56.73%	152,117	56.73%	160,457	56.44%	179,251	56.59%	213,754	56.49%
Nabha State	50,178	19.16%	58,550	19.65%	46,032	18.5%	50,756	19.27%	57,393	19.96%	70,373	20.45%
Faridkot State	29,035	29.92%	35,996	28.82%	37,105	28.48%	44,813	29.74%	49,912	30.37%	61,352	30.79%
Malerkotla State	24,616	34.65%	27,229	35.13%	25,942	36.46%	28,413	35.37%	31,417	37.82%	33,881	38.45%
Total Muslims	2,440,888	36.94%	2,898,114	37.74%	2,515,774	36.83%	2,686,598	36.99%	3,072,619	37.83%	3,748,410	38.42%
Total Population	6,607,699	100%	7,679,645	100%	6,830,507	100%	7,262,881	100%	8,123,076	100%	9,757,161	100%

=== Modern era ===
1951
Area	Muslim	Muslim %
Punjab A (Note: Comprising parts of contemporary Haryana, Punjab, India & Himachal Pradesh)	229,080	1.85%
Punjab B (Note: Comprising PEPSU, which forms parts of contemporary Punjab, India, Haryana, and Himachal Pradesh.)	55,913	1.6%
Punjab C (Note: Comprising Himachal Pradesh & Bilaspur.)	15,253	1.37%
Total East Punjab	300,246	1.77%

Muslims in the districts of the contemporary Punjab State, India region (1951–2011)
District	1951		1961		1971		2011	
District	Pop.	%	Pop.	%	Pop.	%	Pop.	%
Barnala district	41,673	7.76%	—N/a	—N/a	—N/a	—N/a	13,100	2.2%
Gurdaspur district	9,370	1.23%	5,566	0.56%	6,868	0.56%	27,667	1.2%
Firozpur district	4,805	0.37%	3,369	0.21%	6,340	0.33%	6,844	0.34%
Amritsar district	4,237	0.33%	2,401	0.16%	3,044	0.17%	12,502	0.5%
Sangrur district	3,741	0.58%	55,738	3.91%	64,448	5.62%	179,116	10.82%
Ludhiana district	3,360	0.42%	4,686	0.46%	5,620	0.4%	77,713	2.22%
Patiala district	2,893	0.55%	11,714	1.12%	13,644	1.12%	40,043	2.11%
Jalandhar district	2,569	0.25%	3,184	0.26%	3,362	0.23%	30,233	1.38%
Fatehgarh Sahib district	2,269	0.96%	—N/a	—N/a	—N/a	—N/a	16,808	2.8%
Hoshiarpur district	1,353	0.12%	7,050	0.57%	3,456	0.33%	23,089	1.46%
Kapurthala district	854	0.29%	856	0.25%	858	0.2%	10,190	1.25%
Bathinda district	416	0.06%	3,340	0.32%	3,829	0.29%	16,299	1.17%
Rupnagar district	—N/a	—N/a	—N/a	—N/a	2,978	0.55%	14,492	2.12%
Sahibzada Ajit Singh Nagar district	—N/a	—N/a	—N/a	—N/a	—N/a	—N/a	29,488	2.96%
Mansa district	—N/a	—N/a	—N/a	—N/a	—N/a	—N/a	10,375	1.35%
Moga district	—N/a	—N/a	—N/a	—N/a	—N/a	—N/a	9,388	0.94%
Shaheed Bhagat Singh Nagar district	—N/a	—N/a	—N/a	—N/a	—N/a	—N/a	6,829	1.12%
Sri Muktsar Sahib district	—N/a	—N/a	—N/a	—N/a	—N/a	—N/a	4,333	0.48%
Tarn Taran district	—N/a	—N/a	—N/a	—N/a	—N/a	—N/a	3,855	0.34%
Faridkot district	—N/a	—N/a	—N/a	—N/a	—N/a	—N/a	3,125	0.51%
Total Muslims	77,540	0.85%	97,904	0.85%	114,447	0.84%	535,489	1.93%
Total Population	9,144,716	100%	11,497,826	100%	13,551,060	100%	27,743,338	100%

== Language ==
Languages spoken among Punjab's Muslims (2011 Census)
Languages	Percent
Urdu/Hindi	58.57%
Punjabi	41.43%

Out of 5.35 lakh Muslim population in the state as of 2011 census, only 2.21 lakh Muslims are native and speaks Punjabi as their mother tongue and rest 3.13 lakh speaks Hindustani language mainly Urdu.

== Culture ==
Despite being in small number, Punjab has producted a large number of singers, musicians, writers and entertainers, who are not immigrant but ethnic Punjabis.

=== Sufism ===
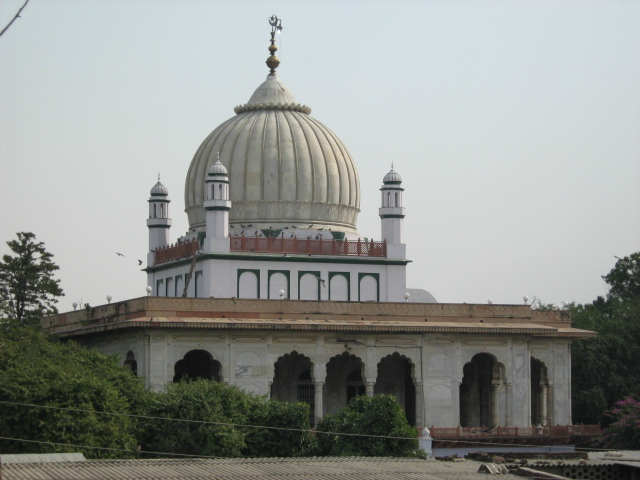
Tomb of Ahmad Sirhindi, Rauza Sharif Complex, Sirhind

Sufism has also played a major role in the history of Punjab. Many prominent Sufi saints were born in Punjab, including Fariduddin Ganjshakar, Waris Shah and Bulleh Shah. Some of the popular Sufi shrines in the state of Punjab are Rauza Sharif in Fatehgarh Sahib and Dera Baba Murad Shah in Nakodar. The Baba Haider Shaikh Shrine in Malerkolta is very popular among the Punjabis and is actively managed by the Muslims of the district.

=== Language ===
Punjabi Muslims had a major contribution in the development of Punjabi language. Fariduddin Ganjshakar (1179–1266) is recognised as the first major poet of the Punjabi language. Roughly from the 12th century to the 19th century, many great Sufi saints and poets preached in the Punjabi language, the most prominent being Bulleh Shah. Punjabi Sufi poetry also developed under Shah Hussain (1538–1599), Sultan Bahu (1630–1691), Shah Sharaf (1640–1724), Ali Haider (1690–1785), Waris Shah (1722–1798), Saleh Muhammad Safoori (1747–1826), Mian Muhammad Baksh (1830–1907) and Khwaja Ghulam Farid (1845–1901).

=== Literature ===
The Punjabi language is famous for its rich literature of qisse, most of which are about love, passion, betrayal, sacrifice, social values and a common man's revolt against a larger system. The qissa of Heer Ranjha by Waris Shah (1706–1798) is among the most popular of Punjabi qissas. Other popular stories include Sohni Mahiwal by Fazal Shah, Mirza Sahiban by Hafiz Barkhudar (1658–1707), Sassui Punnhun by Hashim Shah (c. 1735–c. 1843), and Qissa Puran Bhagat by Qadaryar (1802–1892). In contrast to Persian poets, who had preferred the ghazal for poetic expression, Punjabi Sufi poets tended to compose in the Kafi.

=== Music ===
Punjabi music is used by western musicians in many ways, such as mixing with other compositions. Sufi music and Qawali, commonly practiced in Pakistani Punjab; are other important genres in the Punjab region. Folk music of Punjab is the traditional music of Punjab produced using traditional musical instruments like Tumba, Algoza, Dhadd, Sarangi, Chimta and more. There is a wide range of folk songs for every occasion from birth to death including marriage, festivals, fairs and religious ceremonies. Despite being in small number, Punjab has producted a large number of singers and m

== Trends ==
Decadal percentage of Muslims in Punjab, India

Year	Percent	Increase
1901	37.74%	N/A
1911	36.83%	-0.91%
1921	36.99%	+0.16%
1931	37.83%	+0.84%
1941	38.42%	+0.59%
1947	0.5%	-37.92%
1951	0.63%	+0.13%
1961	0.82%	+0.19%
1971	0.93%	+0.11%
1981	1%	+0.07%
1991	1.18%	+0.18%
2001	1.57%	+0.39%
2011	1.93%	+0.36%

The Muslim percentage as total population have declined drastically from 38.38% in 1941 to 0.5% in 1947. But after Independence, Muslims have grown slightly from 0.63% in 1951 to 1.93% in 2011 census.

== Notable people ==
=== Entertainers, actors and actress ===
- Anas Rashid (b.1981), actor, best known for role of Suraj in Diya Aur Baati Hum (2011)
- Begum Para (1926–2008), actress
- Mohammad Nazim (b.1986), actor, best known for the role of Ahem Modi in Saath Nibhaana Saathiya (2010–2017)
- Suraiya (1929–2004), actress and singer
- Amar Noorie, singer and actress

=== Independence activists ===
- Bibi Amtus Salam, activisit and follower of Mahatma Gandhi
- Saifuddin Kitchlew (1888–1963), independence activist and member of the INC

=== Politicians ===
- Begum Aizaz Rasul (1909–2001), Member of Constituent Assembly of India
- Iftikhar Ali Khan (1904–1982), the Nawab of Malerkotla and former parliamentarian
- Mohammad Jamil Ur Rahman (b. 1959), MLA representing Malerkotla and member of Aam Aadmi Party
- Razia Sultana (b.1966), former Cabinet Minister, Government of Punjab

=== Scholars and ulema ===
- Abdul Qadir Ludhianvi, Islamic ulema and revolutionary in the 1857 rebellion
- Habibur Rehman Ludhianvi (1892–1956), Islamic ulema and Imam of a mosque in Ludhiana

=== Academic ===
- Farida Abdulla Khan (b.1951), faculty at Jamia Millia Islamia, Delhi

=== Singers and Musicians ===
- Angrej Ali
- Afsana Khan
- Bade Ghulam Ali Khan (1902-1968)
- Dilshad Akhtar (1966–1996)
- Kamal Khan
- Manpreet Akhtar (1965–2016)
- Mohammed Zahur Khayyam (1927–2019)
- Mohammed Rafi (1924–1980)
- Sardool Sikander (1961–2021)
- Swarn Noora
- Nooran Sisters

=== Writers and poets ===
- Irshad Kamil
- Sahir Ludhianvi (1921–1980)
- K. L. Gauba

=== Military ===
- Shah Nawaz Khan (1914–1983), Army General and later Member of Parliament

=== Sportspeople ===
- Asim Hassan
- Anwar Ali (footballer, born 1984)
- Abdul Hannan (footballer)
- Anwar Ali (footballer, born 2000)
- Mohammad Saukat
- Mohammad Sajid Dhot

== See also ==
- Demographics of Punjab, India
- Religion in the Punjab
- Sufism in Punjab
