= Kuch Kuch Hota Hai (song) =

Song by Alka Yagnik and Udit Narayan

from the album Kuch Kuch Hota Hai
- Language: Hindi
- English title: Something Happens
- Released: 16 August 1998
- Genre: Feature film soundtrack
- Length: 4:56
- Label: Sony Music
- Composer: Jatin-Lalit
- Lyricist: Sameer Anjaan
- Producer: Jatin-Lalit

"Kuch Kuch Hota Hai" (transl. Something Happens) also commonly known as Tum Pas Aaye is an Indian Hindi-language song, composed by Jatin-Lalit and sung by Alka Yagnik and Udit Narayan, from the 1998 soundtrack album to the film of the same name. The lyrics was penned by Sameer Anjaan, who came at a time when Javed Akhtar refused to work in the film. The music video of the track was filmed in Scotland and it features actors namely Shah Rukh Khan, Kajol and Rani Mukerji. The song was a popular hit and it was still in the Indian music charts on 21 October 1999. In 2025, on India's 76th Republic Day, the song was played by the Indonesian delegation in honor of the visiting president from Indonesia, Prabowo Subianto.

== Background ==
In 1998 at 26, the young Karan Johar was yet to make his directorial debut in Hindi film industry when he came up with the idea of Kuch Kuch Hota Hai (KKHH) for which he searched lyricist for the songs, and actors for casting in the film. He first found Javed Akhtar, at that time an acclaimed songwriter in Hindi cinema, who wrote the lyrics for the first song in the soundtrack album of KKHH, "Koi Mil Gaya". Upon learning the title of the film, Akhtar refused to pen the lyrics for the title track as he found it to be "absurd or vulgar" and also remarked, "Kuch Kuch Hota Hai... kya hota hai?" (transl. Something happens... what happens?). Also in a fit of anger, Akhtar also gave out some of the original lyrics of the song which would be the precursor to the full lyrics. He regretted the decision to step away from the film after it turned out to be a hit.

Yash Chopra had introduced the new lyricist of the film, Sameer Anjaan, to Johar who was known to Chopra through a cameo appearance of Johar in the 1995 Bollywood film, Dilwale Dulhania Le Jayenge. At the time, the only other lyricist who worked with Johar was Anand Bakshi, who fell out of favor with the director. Anjaan after listening to the plot and storyline of the yet-to-be-released film, accepted to work in it. Thinking that Johar wanted good poetry to be suitable for the title song's lyrics, Anjaan made a draft (below) in Urdu that was different from his usual songwriting style. Johar after listening to the lyrics as told by Anjaan, was silent for a few minutes before commenting, "Sameer ji, I asked you to write my songs considering you are a young man, but you are sounding older than Majrooh Sahab and Anand Bakshi Sahab ... Sir, don’t take any pressure. Just write very simple poetry".

Zulfon ke saaye, rukh pe giraaye,
Shaidaai mere dil ko banaaye,
Shabanam ke moti pal pal pirota hai,
Kya karun haye kuch kuch hota hai

Translation:

Shadow of hair, falls on the stance,
The lover makes my heart,
He threads Shabnam's pearls every moment,
What do I do, oh! something happens

Coming back dejected, Anjaan tried again to write the lyrics which went as "Tum pas aaye, yun muskuraye ... kuch kuch hota hai" (transl. You come close, and smiled in a way ... something happens). This time the lyrics worked as Johar jubilantly "jumped from one sofa to another" and remarked, "Sir! This is what I wanted from you!" The idea for the opening lines in the song was given to Johar by Jugal Hansraj.

With the cast ready for the title song of KKHH, namely Shah Rukh Khan (as Rahul Khanna), Kajol (as Anjali Sharma) and Rani Mukerji (as Tina Malhotra), the song sequences were filmed in the countryside of Scotland which include locations namely Glencoe, Ross Priory and Loch Lomond. Yash Johar, the father of Karan Johar and also the film's producer, had requested Santosh Sivan for filming the song sequences which the latter agreed and it was completed in five days. During the shoot, Kajol had accompanied Tanisha Mukerji while coming to the set and Farah Khan, the film's choreographer, recalled in a blog with Mukerji that it was very chilly in Scotland and they had to wear garbage bags to protect themselves from the harsh weather.

== Reception ==
Soon after the soundtrack album's release, the song turned out to be a popular hit among the Indian audiences and it soon reached out to International markets for e.g., Indonesia. It remained on the Indian music charts for over a year as seen on 21 October 1999. Critical commentary had reviewed the relationship between Rahul and Tina, and later Rahul and Anjali in the music video, that their love is not a submission to the "pressure of social expectations" rather it is the result of "deep emotional introspection, mutual respect, and personal growth". Two decades later since its release, the title song is regarded as one of the best film songs produced by the Hindi film industry.

For the income that was made after the release of the soundtrack album for Kuch Kuch Hota Hai, Shah Rukh Khan, one of the film's actors and Karan Johar, its director had given a percentage share of the music's earnings to its composer, Jatin-Lalit. This was one of the first times that in Hindi film industry, the music earnings would be given to the composer and not entirely kept by the producer and actors, as earlier the composer's contract only allowed for a one-time service fee. The Indian Performing Rights Society acts as the body that ensures this norm as a practice today.

== Other versions ==
On 7 March 2006, Maharaja Entertainment Pvt. Ltd. released the soundtrack album of Kuch Kuch Hota Hai in Sinhala language which also included the title song. This version was sung by Mohini Sing and Noel Raj.

== Legacy ==
The tune that would be played out along with the logo of Dharma Productions was inspired from this title song.

On a 15 November 2015 concert in Aratani Theatre, Los Angeles, Alka Yagnik performed the title song with the duo of Jatin-Lalit, the song's composers, on stage which was well received by the audience.

On 26 January 2025 in the eve of India's 76th Republic Day celebrations, the Indonesian delegation performed the song at the banquet in which the Indian President, Draupadi Murmu hosted the Indonesian President, Prabowo Subianto. Lalit Pandit, one-half of the Jatin-Lalit duo, had recalled in an interview with The Times of India that during his visit to Bali in 2000, his visa was fast tracked when the airport staff got to know that he was the original composer of the title song. Upon reaching his hotel room, he saw the Indonesian dubbed version of the film, Kuch Kuch Hota Hai, which also featured the title song being played in television at the time. He remarked that KKHH was, "supposedly the most famous and loved film in Southeast Asia".

At the 2025 ICC Women's Cricket World Cup held in India, the Emirates cabin crew had danced to the title song which received mixed reactions.

== Accolades ==
Award	Date of the ceremony	Category	Recipients	Result	Ref.
Filmfare Awards	21 February 1999	Best Lyricist	Sameer for "Kuch Kuch Hota Hai"	Nominated	
Filmfare Awards	21 February 1999	Best Male Playback Singer	Udit Narayan for "Kuch Kuch Hota Hai"	Nominated	
Filmfare Awards	21 February 1999	Best Female Playback Singer	Alka Yagnik for "Kuch Kuch Hota Hai"	Nominated	
Zee Cine Awards	14 March 1999	Best Lyricist	Sameer for "Kuch Kuch Hota Hai"	Won	
Zee Cine Awards	14 March 1999	Best Playback Singer – Female	Alka Yagnik for "Kuch Kuch Hota Hai"	Won	
Bollywood Movie Awards	May 1999	Best Male Playback Singer	Udit Narayan for "Kuch Kuch Hota Hai"	Won	
Bollywood Movie Awards	May 1999	Best Female Playback Singer	Alka Yagnik for "Kuch Kuch Hota Hai"	Won	
Best Popular Film Providing Wholesome Entertainment	15 February 2000	Best Female Playback Singer	Alka Yagnik for "Kuch Kuch Hota Hai"	Won	

== See also ==
- Tujhe Yaad Na Meri Aayee – Hindi language song (1998)
