= Dilshad Akhtar =

Indian singer (died 1996)

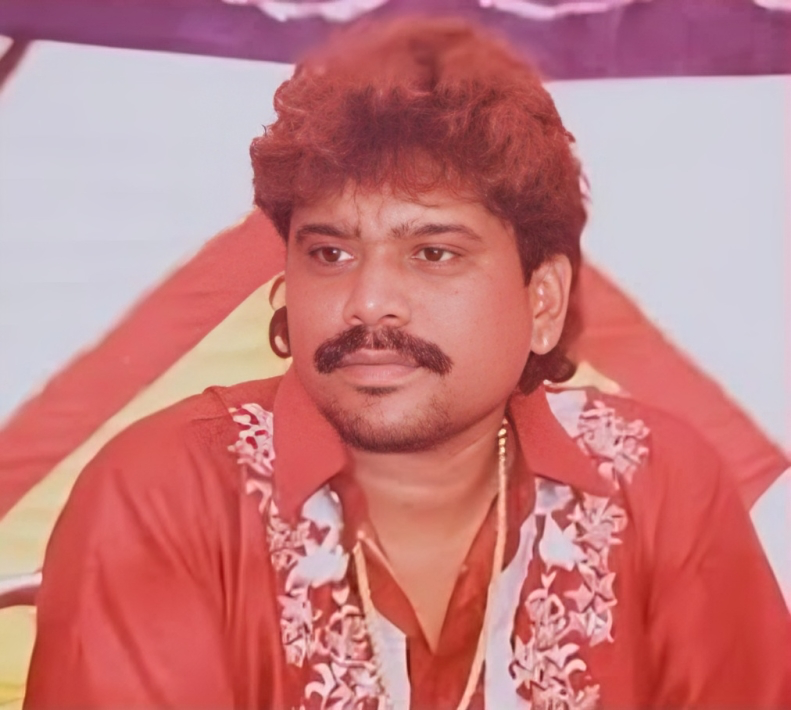
- Akhtar in 1995
- Born: 1966; Giljewala, Punjab, India
- Died: 28 January 1996; Singhpura, Punjab, India
- Occupation: Singer

Dilshad Akhtar (1966 - 28 January 1996) was an Indian singer singer known for his contributions to Punjabi folk music and as a playback singer in numerous Punjabi films. He was part of a musical family, with his sister Manpreet Akhtar and cousin Sandeep Akhtar also being Punjabi singers. He was shot dead during a live performance in 1996.

== Biography ==
Akhtar was born in the Giljewala village of the Sri Muktsar Sahib district of Indian Punjab and learned music from his teacher in Faridkot.

On 28 January 1996, Akhtar was killed by a Deputy superintendent of police, Swarn Singh Hundal, who shot him dead using an AK-47 during a live performance in Singhpura village of Gurdaspur district, when Akhtar refused to entertain a request from the DSP, to sing a song of another singer. The DSP committed suicide in 2012.

After Akhtar's death, his sister Manpreet Akhtar (1965–2016) became a folk and playback singer, famous for songs like "Tujhe Yaad Na Meri Aayee" from the Bollywood film Kuch Kuch Hota Hai (1998), while his cousin Sandeep Akhtar (died 2011) was also a singer.
