= Dushman (1998 film) =

- Poster
- Directed by: Tanuja Chandra
- Screenplay by: Mahesh Bhatt
- Dialogues by: Girish Dhamija
- Story by: Sachin Bhowmick
- Produced by: Mukesh Bhatt; Pooja Bhatt
- Starring: Sanjay Dutt; Kajol; Ashutosh Rana
- Cinematography: Nirmal Jani
- Edited by: Waman B. Bhosle
- Music by: Songs: Uttam Singh; Background Score: Aadesh Shrivastava
- Production companies: Pooja Bhatt Productions; Vishesh Films
- Distributed by: Eros Entertainment
- Release date: 29 May 1998
- Running time: 145 minutes
- Country: India
- Language: Hindi
- Budget: ₹4 crore
- Box office: ₹10.16 crore

Dushman (translation: Enemy) is a 1998 Indian Hindi-language psychological thriller film directed by Tanuja Chandra starring Kajol, Sanjay Dutt, and Ashutosh Rana. The film is a remake of 1996 American film Eye for an Eye.

At the 44th Filmfare Awards, Dushman won Best Villain (Rana), in addition to a nomination for Best Supporting Actress (Tanvi Azmi). Moreover, Kajol also received a Best Actress nomination at the ceremony for her performance in the film, but instead won the award for her performance in Kuch Kuch Hota Hai.

== Plot ==
Sonia and Naina Sehgal (Kajol) are twins. Though identical, they couldn't be more different, with Sonia being outgoing and extroverted, and Naina being shy and introverted. In a parallel storyline, the police are hunting for a sadistic killer and rapist, Gokul Pandit (Ashutosh Rana).

Tragedy strikes the Sehgal household when Gokul rapes and brutally kills Sonia. After a police investigation, Gokul is caught but declared innocent as Sunanda, one of the main witnesses (and Gokul's fiancé) gives a false statement in court. Naina is distraught and vows to hunt down Gokul. Gokul soon goes after Naina and she realizes she needs help to overcome her fear of Gokul. With revenge in her mind, she meets Suraj Singh Rathod (Sanjay Dutt), a blind military veteran, who helps her to rid her fear of Gokul. While Suraj trains Naina, they develop feelings for each other.

One day - after an argument - Suraj refuses to meet Naina and she decides to go after Gokul all by herself, who kidnaps Naina's younger sister (Dia) from school in order to scare Naina. Naina's mother consequently decides to leave for Nainital immediately as her daughter's life is at risk. However, Naina cannot control her hatred and wanted to avenge her sister at any cost. Naina lays a trap for Gokul and tries to kill him but Gokul ties her up and tries to rape her like her sister. Suraj arrives at her house and fights Gokul but ends up being stabbed. Naina manages to get free and fatally shoot Gokul.

Suraj recovers from his injuries and decides to go away from Naina, but she realizes that she loves him and cannot live without him. The movie ends with Naina and Suraj getting together at the airport where he was about to leave the city.

== Cast ==
- Sanjay Dutt as Suraj Singh Rathod
- Kajol as Sonia / Naina Sehgal (dual role)
- Ashutosh Rana as Gokul Pandit
- Jas Arora as Kabir Singh Rathod
- Tanvi Azmi as Dr. Poornima Sehgal (a psychiatrist)
- Pramod Moutho as ACP Santosh Singh Sehgal
- Master Kunal Khemu as Bheem Bahadur Singh
- Pratima Kazmi as Prosecutor
- Anupam Shyam as Inspector Dubey
- Vani Tripathi as Sunanda Tripathi
- Amardeep Jha as Jaya
- Rahul Singh as Real taxi driver

== Soundtrack ==
The music for the film was composed by Uttam Singh and Anand Bakshi penned the lyrics. Music was very popular when released.

#	Title	Singer(s)
1.	"Aawaz Do Humko" (Happy)	Lata Mangeshkar, Udit Narayan
2.	"Chithi Na Koi Sandesh" (Male)	Jagjit Singh
3.	"Pyar Ko Ho Jane Do"	Kumar Sanu, Lata Mangeshkar
4.	"Chithi Na Koi Sandesh" (Female)	Lata Mangeshkar
5.	"Aawaz Do Humko" (Sad)	Lata Mangeshkar, Udit Narayan
6.	"Khoobsurat"	Kumar Sanu
7.	"Hippy Hippy Ya"	Asha Bhosle, Shankar Mahadevan
8.	"Chidiya Chidiya"	Children
9.	"Tunna Tunna"	Shankar Mahadevan

== Awards and nominations ==
Award	Date (Note: Linked to the article about the awards held that year, wherever possible.)	Category	Recipient(s) / nominee(s)	Result	Ref.
Filmfare Awards	21 January 1999	Best Actress	Kajol	Nominated	
Filmfare Awards	21 January 1999	Best Supporting Actress	Tanvi Azmi	Nominated	
Filmfare Awards	21 January 1999	Best Villain	Ashutosh Rana	Won	
Screen Awards	16 January 1999	Best Villain	Ashutosh Rana	Won	
Screen Awards	16 January 1999	Best Actress	Kajol	Won	
Screen Awards	16 January 1999	Best Debut Director	Tanuja Chandra	Won	
