= 44th Filmfare Awards =

1999 awards for Hindi cinema

- Date: 21 February 1999
- Site: Mumbai, India

Highlights
- Best Film: Kuch Kuch Hota Hai
- Critics Award for Best Film: Satya
- Most awards: Kuch Kuch Hota Hai (8)
- Most nominations: Kuch Kuch Hota Hai (18)

The 44th Filmfare Awards were held on 21 February 1999, in Mumbai, India.

Karan Johar's directorial debut Kuch Kuch Hota Hai led the ceremony with 18 nominations and 8 wins – including a sweep of the major acting categories, a record it held till Gully Boy (2019).

Mani Ratnam's Dil Se.. and Ram Gopal Varma's Satya were the other big winners, with 6 awards each.

Kajol received triple nominations for Best Actress for her performances in Dushman, Kuch Kuch Hota Hai and Pyaar To Hona Hi Tha, winning for Kuch Kuch Hota Hai.

== Awards ==
The winners and nominees for all categories are listed below. The winners are listed first, highlighted in boldface, and indicated with a double dagger (‡).

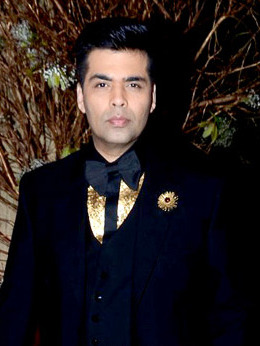
Karan Johar — Best Director winner for Kuch Kuch Hota Hai

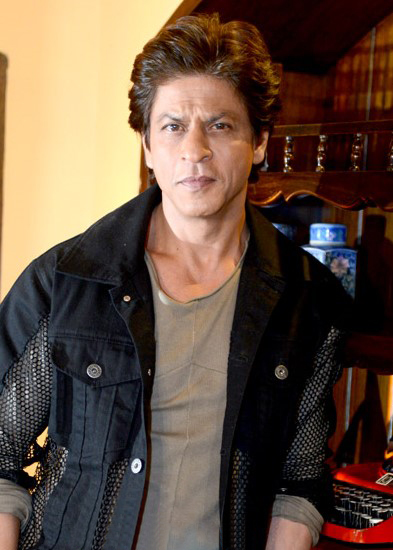
Shah Rukh Khan — Best Actor Popular winner for Kuch Kuch Hota Hai

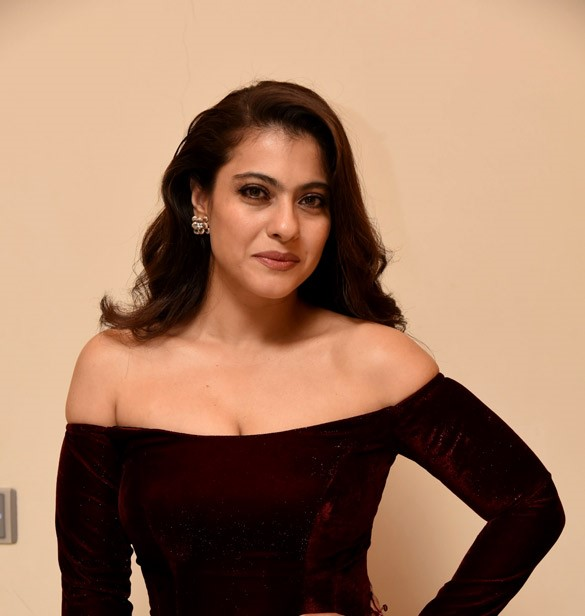
Kajol — Best Actress Popular winner for Kuch Kuch Hota Hai

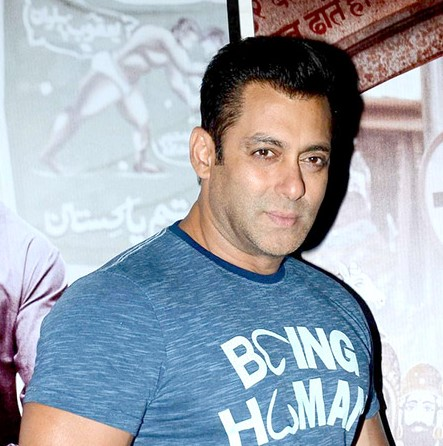
Salman Khan — Best Supporting Actor winner for Kuch Kuch Hota Hai

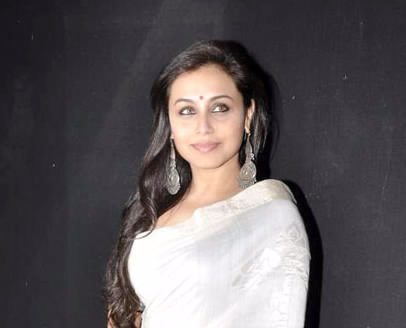
Rani Mukerji — Best Supporting Actress winner for Kuch Kuch Hota Hai

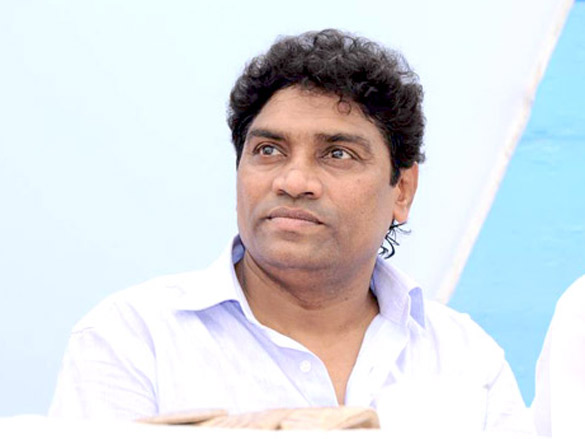
Johnny Lever — Best Performance in a Comic Role winner for Dulhe Raja

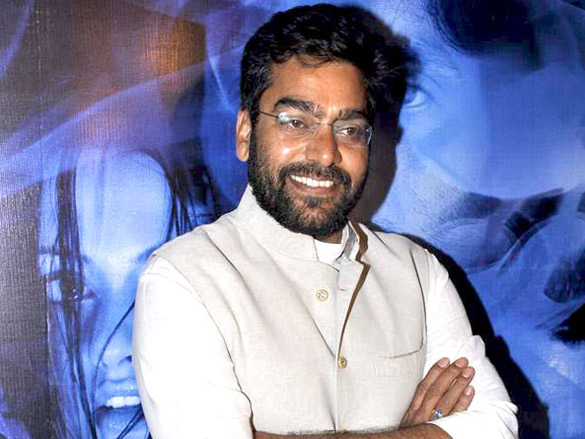
Ashutosh Rana — Best Performance in a Negative Role winner for Dushman

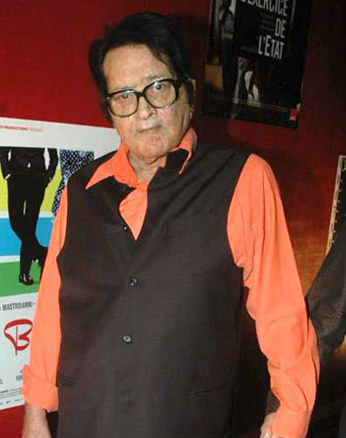
Manoj Kumar — Lifetime Achievement Awardee

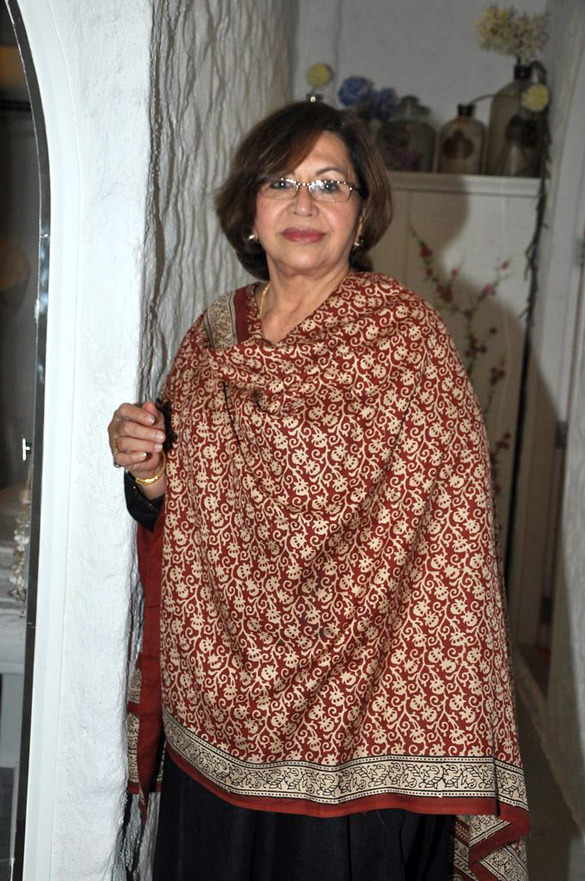
Helen — Lifetime Achievement Awardee

=== Popular Awards ===
Best Film	Best Director
**Kuch Kuch Hota Hai**; Ghulam; Pyaar Kiya To Darna Kya; Pyaar To Hona Hi Tha; Satya	**Karan Johar – Kuch Kuch Hota Hai**; Abbas–Mustan – Soldier; Ram Gopal Varma – Satya; Sohail Khan – Pyaar Kiya To Darna Kya; Vikram Bhatt – Ghulam
Best Actor	Best Actress
**Shah Rukh Khan – Kuch Kuch Hota Hai**; Aamir Khan – Ghulam; Ajay Devgn – Zakhm; Govinda – Bade Miyan Chote Miyan; Salman Khan – Pyaar Kiya To Darna Kya	**Kajol – Kuch Kuch Hota Hai**; Kajol – Dushman; Kajol – Pyaar To Hona Hi Tha; Manisha Koirala – Dil Se..; Urmila Matondkar – Satya
Best Supporting Actor	Best Supporting Actress
**Salman Khan – Kuch Kuch Hota Hai**; Arbaaz Khan – Pyaar Kiya To Darna Kya; Manoj Bajpai – Satya; Naseeruddin Shah – China Gate; Om Puri – Pyaar To Hona Hi Tha	**Rani Mukerji – Kuch Kuch Hota Hai**; Preity Zinta – Dil Se..; Raakhee – Soldier; Shefali Shah – Satya; Tanvi Azmi – Dushman
Best Performance in a Comic Role	Best Performance in a Negative Role
**Johnny Lever – Dulhe Raja**; Anupam Kher – Kuch Kuch Hota Hai; Archana Puran Singh – Kuch Kuch Hota Hai; Johnny Lever – Kuch Kuch Hota Hai; Kader Khan – Dulhe Raja	**Ashutosh Rana – Dushman**; Govind Namdeo – Satya; Mukesh Tiwari – China Gate; Shah Rukh Khan – Duplicate; Sharat Saxena – Ghulam
Best Music Director	Best Lyricist
**Dil Se... – A. R. Rahman**; Bade Miyan Chote Miyan – Viju Shah; Kuch Kuch Hota Hai – Jatin–Lalit; Pyaar To Hona Hi Tha – Jatin–Lalit; Soldier – Anu Malik	**Dil Se.. – Gulzar for Chaiyya Chaiyya**; Dil Se.. – Gulzar for Ae Ajnabi; Duplicate – Javed Akhtar for Mere Mehboob Mere Sanam; Kuch Kuch Hota Hai – Sameer for Kuch Kuch Hota Hai; Kuch Kuch Hota Hai – Sameer for Ladki Badi Anjaani Hai
Best Male Playback Singer	Best Female Playback Singer
**Dil Se.. – Sukhwinder Singh for Chaiyya Chaiyya**; Ghulam – Aamir Khan for Aati Kya Khandala; Kuch Kuch Hota Hai – Kumar Sanu for Ladki Badi Anjaani Hai; Kuch Kuch Hota Hai – Udit Narayan for Kuch Kuch Hota Hai; Pyaar Kiya To Darna Kya – Kamaal Khan for O O Jaane Jaana	**Pyaar To Hona Hi Tha – Jaspinder Narula for Pyaar To Hona Hi Tha**; China Gate – Alka Yagnik for Chamma Chamma; Dil Se.. – Sapna Awasthi for Chaiyya Chaiyya; Kareeb – Sanjeevani for Chori Chori; Kuch Kuch Hota Hai – Alka Yagnik for Kuch Kuch Hota Hai; Kuch Kuch Hota Hai – Alka Yagnik for Ladki Badi Anjaani Hai

=== Technical Awards ===
Best Story	Best Screenplay
**Zakhm – Mahesh Bhatt**	**Kuch Kuch Hota Hai – Karan Johar**
Best Dialogue	Best Action
**China Gate – Rajkumar Santoshi and K. K. Raina**	**Soldier – Akbar Bakshi**
Best Background Score	Best Choreography
**Satya – Sandeep Chowta**	**Dil Se.. – Farah Khan for Chaiyya Chaiyya**
Best Editing	Best Art Direction
**Satya – Apurva Asrani and Bhanu Daya**	**Kuch Kuch Hota Hai – Sharmishta Roy**
Best Sound Design	Best Cinematography
**Satya – H. Shridhar**	**Dil Se.. – Santosh Sivan**

=== Special awards ===
Lifetime Achievement Award
Manoj Kumar	Helen
Best Male Debut
**Fardeen Khan – Prem Aggan**
Best Female Debut
**Preity Zinta – Dil Se.., Soldier**
R. D. Burman Award
**Kamaal Khan**
Special Award
**Shekhar Kapur**
Scene of the Year
**Ghulam**

== Critics' awards ==
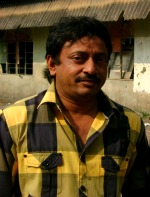
Ram Gopal Varma — Best Director Critics winner for Satya

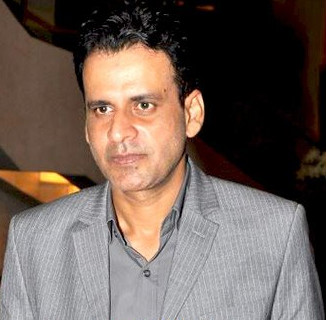
Manoj Bajpayee — Best Actor Critics winner for Satya

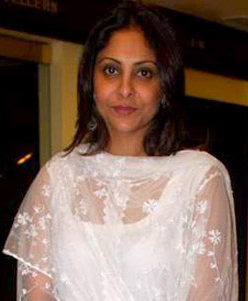
Shefali Shah — Best Actress Critics winner for Satya

=== Best Film ===
Satya

=== Best Actor ===
Manoj Bajpai – Satya

=== Best Actress ===
Shefali Shah – Satya

== Superlatives ==
Multiple nominations
Nominations	Film
18	Kuch Kuch Hota Hai
12	Satya
10	Dil Se..
6	Ghulam
6	Pyaar Kiya To Darna Kya
5	Pyaar To Hona Hi Tha
5	Soldier
4	China Gate
3	Dushman
2	Bade Miyan Chote Miyan
2	Dulhe Raja
2	Duplicate
2	Zakhm

Multiple wins
Awards	Film
8	Kuch Kuch Hota Hai
6	Dil Se..
6	Satya
2	Soldier

== See also ==
- 43rd Filmfare Awards
- Filmfare Awards
