= Dil Se.. =

1998 Indian film by Mani Ratnam

- English release poster
- Directed by: Mani Ratnam
- Screenplay by: Mani Ratnam
- Story by: Mani Ratnam
- Dialogues by: Tigmanshu Dhulia
- Produced by: Bharat Shah; Mani Ratnam; Ram Gopal Varma; Shekhar Kapur
- Starring: Shah Rukh Khan; Manisha Koirala; Preity Zinta
- Cinematography: Santosh Sivan
- Edited by: Suresh Urs
- Music by: A. R. Rahman
- Production companies: Madras Talkies; Varma Corporation
- Distributed by: Eros International
- Release date: 21 August 1998
- Running time: 167 minutes
- Country: India
- Language: Hindi
- Budget: ₹11.5 crores
- Box office: ₹28.40 crores

Dil Se.. (transl. From the heart..) is a 1998 Indian Hindi-language romantic thriller film written and directed by Mani Ratnam who produced it with Ram Gopal Varma and Shekhar Kapur. Set against the backdrop of Insurgency in Assam, the film stars Shah Rukh Khan and Manisha Koirala, while Preity Zinta makes her film debut in a supporting role. An example of parallel cinema, it is noted as the final installment in Ratnam's trilogy consisting of Roja (1992) and Bombay (1995). The film's soundtrack album, composed by A. R. Rahman, sold six million units in India.

Dil Se.. was screened at the Era New Horizons Film Festival and the Helsinki International Film Festival. Noted for its aspects of nonlinear storytelling, the film was moderately successful at the domestic box office; however, it was a major success overseas, earning $975,000 in the United States and £537,930 in the United Kingdom, where it was the first Indian film to enter the top 10, and it was also a hit in Japan.

At the 44th Filmfare Awards, Dil Se.. received 10 nominations, including Best Actress (Koirala) and Best Supporting Actress (Zinta), and won 6 awards, including Best Female Debut (Zinta) and Best Music Director (Rahman). At the 46th National Film Awards, the film won two awards – Best Cinematography and Best Audiography, while also receiving a Netpac Award at the 49th Berlinale.

== Plot ==
Amarkant "Amar" Varma is a driven program executive for All India Radio based in New Delhi, dispatched to Assam to report on local perspective regarding the upcoming 50th anniversary of Indian Independence. While stranded during a rainstorm at Haflong railway station, he encounters a mysterious woman whose appearance immediately intrigues him. Despite his attempts at casual conversation, she remains aloof and silent. When she finally requests a cup of tea, Amar rushes to a nearby kiosk, but returns only to see her board a departing train alongside three unidentified men.

Amar proceeds with his assignment in Silchar, where he interviews a cross-section of society, including regional citizens and an extremist insurgent chieftain. The chieftain explicitly accuses the Indian Government and military of widespread human rights violations and institutional neglect, justifying their armed resistance and refusing any diplomatic dialogue with the state. During his travels, Amar spots the mysterious woman again. When he confronts her, she denies any memory of their previous encounter. Undeterred, Amar broadcasts a poetic description of their meeting over the radio, which she overhears. He tracks her to a local post office, corners her, and confesses his love. To deter his persistence, she claims she is married. When a Amar later tries to apologize for his aggressiveness, she leads him into an ambush where two male associates beat him unconscious.

Amar subsequently discovers that the woman lied about her marital status and has abruptly evacuated her residence. By bribing a public telephone operator, he discovers she has been placing regular long-distance calls to Ladakh. Amar travels to Leh under the pretext of recording the Sindhu Darshan Festival. During his reporting, he witnesses military forces neutralizing a local suicide bomber. Amidst the chaos, Amar spots the woman boarding a public bus. When military security details intercept the vehicle to interrogate the passengers, the woman leverages Amar's presence, falsely claiming to the soldiers that he is her husband to evade scrutiny.

When the bus breaks down in a barren terrain, forcing the passengers to trek to a nearby village, Amar confronts her, compelling her to reveal her name as Meghna. They travel together for a day, sharing moments of emotional vulnerability, but Amar wakes up the following morning to find that Meghna has vanished. Unbeknownst to Amar, Meghna is a core operative of an extremist liberation front, currently mobilizing for a series of coordinated suicide bombings in New Delhi during the high-profile Republic Day parade.

A dejected Amar returns to Delhi, where his family arranges a marriage proposal with Preeti Nair, a vibrant woman from Kerala. Believing he will never see Meghna again, Amar acquiesces to the alliance. However, during a public outing with Preeti, Amar recognizes Kim, one of Meghna's insurgent handlers. Amar pursues him through Connaught Place but when cornered by local police, the operative commits suicide by consuming a cyanide capsule. The Central Bureau of Investigation (CBI) assumes control of the case. Concurrently, Meghna arrives in Delhi and subtly reconnects with Amar, requesting that he use his official credentials to secure her a temporary staff position at his broadcasting office. Amar complies, inadvertently allowing her to use his residence to evade the tightening CBI dragnet.

Based on eyewitness accounts from Connaught Place, the CBI places Amar under surveillance as a prime terrorist suspect. Confronting Meghna over her true motives, Amar demands the truth. She reveals her birth name is Moina, disclosing a deeply traumatic childhood where she was brutalized by security forces, and her radicalization into pursuing a suicide-bombing mission.

The following evening, Moina's insurgent cell assaults Amar at a secluded location. During the violent altercation, the handlers receive a radio transmission from Moina. Amar seizes the device and desperately pleads with her to abandon the plot and marry him, but Moina asserts that her trajectory is irreversible. Believing Amar has been executed by her cell, she cuts communication. Concurrently, the CBI raids Amar's home, and takes him into custody, where they sedate him after dismissing his frantic warnings about the Republic Day plot.

On the morning of the parade, Moina dons an explosive vest beneath her civilian attire, preparing to infiltrate the dignitary enclosure. Amar manages a desperate escape from federal custody and intercepts her at her staging location. Intercepting her path, Amar refuses to let her proceed, passionately reaffirming his devotion and pleading with her to choose a life with him. Overwhelmed by her suppressed emotions for Amar, Moina relents and embraces him tightly. As they hold each other, Moina's handler remotely detonates the vest, instantly killing both Amar and Moina. All members of the insurgent cell get seized by the CBI.

== Cast ==
- Shah Rukh Khan as Amarkant "Amar" Verma
- Manisha Koirala as Moina alias Meghna
  - Priya Parulekar as young Moina
- Raghubir Yadav as Shukla
- Arundathi Nag as Kanval Dev Burman, AIR station director
- Zohra Sehgal as Amar's grandmother
- Piyush Mishra as CBI Officer Arun Kashyap
- Preity Zinta as Preeti Nair
- Gautam Bora as ULFA terrorist leader
- Mita Vasisht as Mita ULFA terrorist
- Sabyasachi Chakravarthy as ULFA terrorist
- Krishnakant as ULFA terrorist
- Aditya Srivastava as ULFA terrorist
- Sanjay Mishra as ULFA terrorist
- Anupam Shyam as ULFA terrorist
- Manjit Bawa as ULFA terrorist
- Shabbir Masani as ULFA terrorist
- Vineeta Mallik as Amar's mother
- B. M. Shah
- Gajraj Rao as CBI officer
- Sheeba Chaddha as Moina's sister
- Wasiq Khan
- Sameer Chanda as Tunda music shop dealer
- Janagaraj as taxi driver
- R. K. Nair as Preeti's father
- Alka as Preeti's mother
- Shaad Ali in a cameo appearance as a citizen of Silchar
- Tigmanshu Dhulia as man at the post office
- Malaika Arora as dancer in the song Chaiyya Chaiyya (special appearance)

== Production ==
Filming began in December 1996, while Shah Rukh Khan was also simultaneously shooting for Yash Chopra's Dil To Pagal Hai. Mani Ratnam selected Manisha Koirala to play the lead role, after he was unable to get through to Kajol. Preity Zinta was chosen to play a supporting role. Raveena Tandon was approached by the team to appear in the "Chaiyya Chaiyya" song, but turned down the offer citing her disinterest in featuring as a part of an item number.

Sameer Chanda and Wasiq Khan were the production and art designers for Dil Se... The principal photography took place in Himachal Pradesh, Leh, Assam, New Delhi, Kerala, and Ladakh over a period of 55 days. Tigmanshu Dhulia was the casting director. Pia Benegal and Manish Malhotra were the costume designers. The song "Chaiyya Chaiyya" was shot between Malaika Arora and Shah Rukh Khan on top of the Nilgiri Express, en route Ooty, Coonoor and Kotagiri, the train is particularly painted in brown for the song sequence. The travelling scenes, other crucial scenes were shot between Manisha Koirala and Shah Rukh Khan near Alchi Monastery, during the Sindhu Darshan Festival in Leh. The longest song of the film "Satrangi Re" with the lead pair was shot near Thikse Monastery, the mystical Basgo Monastery ruins, and Pangong lake near Pangong Tso in Ladakh. The song "Jiya Jale" was shot on Preity Zinta and Shah Rukh Khan near Athirappilly Falls, Alappuzha backwaters, Periyar National Park, Vilangan Hills and Periyar Lake in Kerala. Several action sequences in the film choreographed by Allan Amin were shot near Connaught Place, New Delhi, Rajpath and Old Delhi. Filming wrapped up in February 1998.

== Themes ==
Dil Se.. is said to be a journey through the seven shades of love - attraction, infatuation, love, reverence, worship, obsession, and death. The character played by Shah Rukh Khan passes through each shade during the course of the film. Authors Sangita Gopal and Sujata Moorti of Global Bollywood: Travels of Hindi Song and Dance also compared Khan's romance in the film to the trajectory of love in ancient Arabic literature, believing the lyrics in two of the songs to have delivered an "apocalyptic fatalism".

The film is a dramatization of the attraction between a character from the heart of India and another from a peripheral state and a representation of opposites in the eyes of the law and society. Dil Se.. is described as a film "structured through deferment and unfulfilled teasing promises". Rediff.com said about the film, "The entire feel of the film is appropriately poetic, with a few romantic exchanges standing out quite memorable. Tigmanshu Dhulia has handled the film's dialogues adroitly. Amid moonlit desert dunes, there is a particularly stirring conversation between the leading pair. Amar reveals his hate for Meghna's eyes – because he can't see the world is hidden behind them and his love for the same, stunning eyes – because he can't see the world hidden behind them."

Elleke Boehmer and Stephen Morton in their book Terror and the Postcolonial (2009) believe that the songs and their exotic locations in the film were very important in masking the impossible reconciliation between a terrorist and an uptight government agent by evoking pure fantasy. They argue that this is a phenomenon called the "liminal space of dreaming" in that the terrorist woman cannot fulfill her sexual desire so the songs fill the void of this desire by "their sumptuousness and exotic locales" in the Ladakh region.

== Soundtrack ==
Dil Se...

Soundtrack album by A. R. Rahman
- Released: 8 July 1998
- Recorded: Panchathan Record Inn
- Genre: World Music
- Length: 36:38
- Label: Venus
- Producer: A.R. Rahman

A. R. Rahman chronology
Jeans (1998)	Dil Se... (1998)	Earth (1998)

Professional ratings
Review scores
Source	Rating
Planet Bollywood	9.5/10 stars
All Music	3.0/5.0 stars

The soundtrack features six songs composed by A. R. Rahman. Raja Sen of Rediff called it, "Rahman's finest soundtrack, by far." The soundtrack album sold six million units in India. The song "Chaiyya Chaiyya", based on Sufi music (lyrics based on the Sufi folk song, "Thaiyya Thaiyya" by Bulleh Shah) and Urdu poetry, became especially popular and the song has been featured in the film Inside Man (2006), in the musical Bombay Dreams, and in the television shows Smith and CSI: Miami. The soundtrack was recorded in several other languages.

Malayalam lyrics for the song "Jiya Jale" were written by lyricist Gireesh Puthenchery.

The bass guitarist Guy Pratt, played bass on title song "Dil Se Re".

=== Original version ===
Hindi (Dil Se..)

All lyrics are written by Gulzar and Malayalam lyrics from the song "Jiya Jale" was penned by Gireesh Puthenchery; all music is composed by A. R. Rahman.

No.	Title	Singer(s)	Length
1.	"Chaiyya Chaiyya"	Sukhwinder Singh & Sapna Awasthi	6:54
2.	"Dil Se Re (Raga Jog)"	A. R. Rahman, Anuradha Sriram, Anupama & Febi Mani	6:44
3.	"Ae Ajnabi (Raga Bhimpalasi)"	Udit Narayan & Mahalakshmi Iyer	5:48
4.	"Jiya Jale (Raga Bhairavi)"	Lata Mangeshkar, M. G. Sreekumar & Chorus	5:07
5.	"Satrangi Re (Jog)"	Sonu Nigam & Kavita Krishnamurthy	7:25
6.	"Thayya Thayya (Reprise of Chaiyya Chaiyya)"	Sukhwinder Singh	4:35

==== Personnel ====
- Producer: India Talkies (Bharat Shah)
- Director: Mani Ratnam
- Lyrics: Gulzar
- Bass Guitar on "Dil Se Re": Guy Pratt
- Bass Guitar on "Chaiyya Chaiyya": Keith Peters
- Flamenco guitar on "Satrangi Re": John Themis
- Percussion: Sivamani
- Dilruba: Saroja
- Santoor: Seenu
- Engineer – H. Sridhar, S. Sivakumar
- Engineer [Additional Engineer] – Paul Wright
- Ganga, Kanchana, Febi, Seji, Anto, Chandran, Shreenivas, Noell James

=== Dubbed versions ===
==== Tamil (Uyire) ====
All lyrics are written by Vairamuthu and Malayalam lyrics from the song "Nenjinile Nenjinile" was penned by Gireesh Puthenchery; all music is composed by A. R. Rahman.

No.	Title	Singer(s)	Length
1.	"Thaiyya Thaiyya"	Sukhwinder Singh, Malgudi Subha & Palakkad Sreeram	6:55
2.	"Nenjinile Nenjinile"	S. Janaki, M. G. Sreekumar & Chorus	5:09
3.	"Sandhosha Kanneere"	A. R. Rahman, Anuradha Sriram, Febi Mani, Anupama	6:42
4.	"Poongkaatrilae"	Unni Menon & Swarnalatha	5:45
5.	"En Uyire"	Kavita Krishnamurthy, Srinivas & Sujatha	7:26
6.	"Thayya Thayya (Remix)"	Srinivas, Sukhwinder Singh, Hariharan	4:19

==== Telugu (Prematho) ====
All lyrics are written by Sirivennela Seetharama Sastry and Malayalam lyrics from the song "Innaalilaa Ledule" was penned by Gireesh Puthenchery; all music is composed by A. R. Rahman.

No.	Title	Singer(s)	Length
1.	"Chaiyya Chaiyya"	Sukhwinder Singh, Malgudi Subha & Sapna Awasthi	6:52
2.	"Innaalilaa Ledule"	K. S. Chithra, M. G. Sreekumar & Chorus	5:06
3.	"Ninnele"	A. R. Rahman, Sowmya Raoh, Dominique Cerejo & Kavitha Paudwal	6:37
4.	"O Priyatama"	Mano & Swarnalatha	5:42
5.	"Ooristhu Ooguthu"	Kavita Krishnamurthy, Srinivas & Sujatha	7:25
6.	"Chaiyya Chaiyya (Remix)"	Sukhwinder Singh & Sapna Awasthi	4:17

=== Background score ===
Dil Se...

Soundtrack album by A. R. Rahman
- Recorded: Panchathan Record Inn
- Genre: World Music
- Label: Venus
- Producer: A.R. Rahman

==== Hindi (Dil Se..) ====
Track List :

No.	Title	Singer(s)	Length
1.	"Pokhi Pokhi Bidekhi"	Zubeen Garg	01:35

==== Tamil (Uyire) ====
Track List :

No.	Title	Singer(s)	Length
1.	"Pokhi Pokhi Bidekhi"	Zubeen Garg	01:35

==== Malayalam (Uyire) ====
Track List :

No.	Title	Singer(s)	Length
1.	"Pokhi Pokhi Bidekhi"	Zubeen Garg	01:35

==== Telugu (Prematho) ====
Track List :

No.	Title	Singer(s)	Length
1.	"Pokhi Pokhi Bidekhi"	Zubeen Garg	01:35

== Release ==
Dil Se.. released on 21 August 1998. Though the film was shot mainly in Hindi-language, director Mani Ratnam also dubbed and released the film in Tamil and Malayalam in the title Uyire.. (transl. Darling..) which became very popular among Tamil-audience with its songs and in Telugu with the title Prematho (transl. With love). Shah Rukh Khan's Tamil dialogues were dubbed by Arvind Swamy in the film.

== Reception ==
=== Critical reception and box office ===
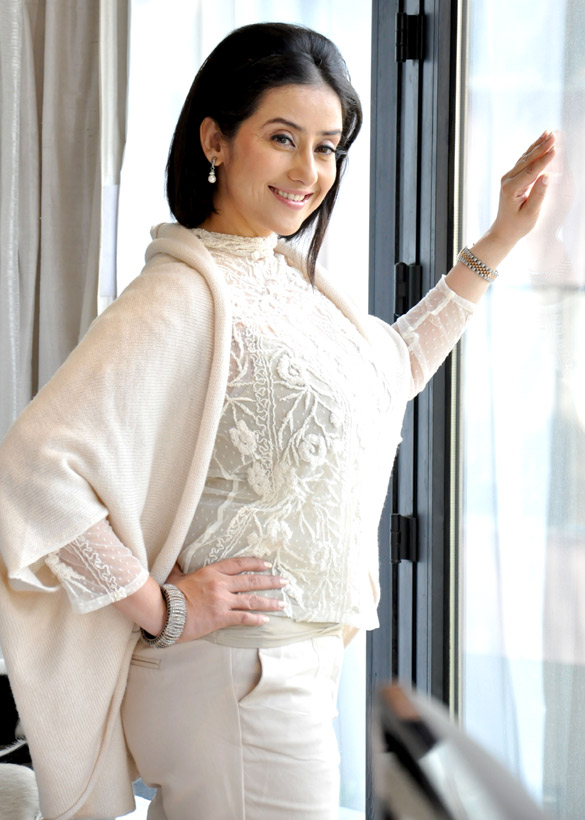
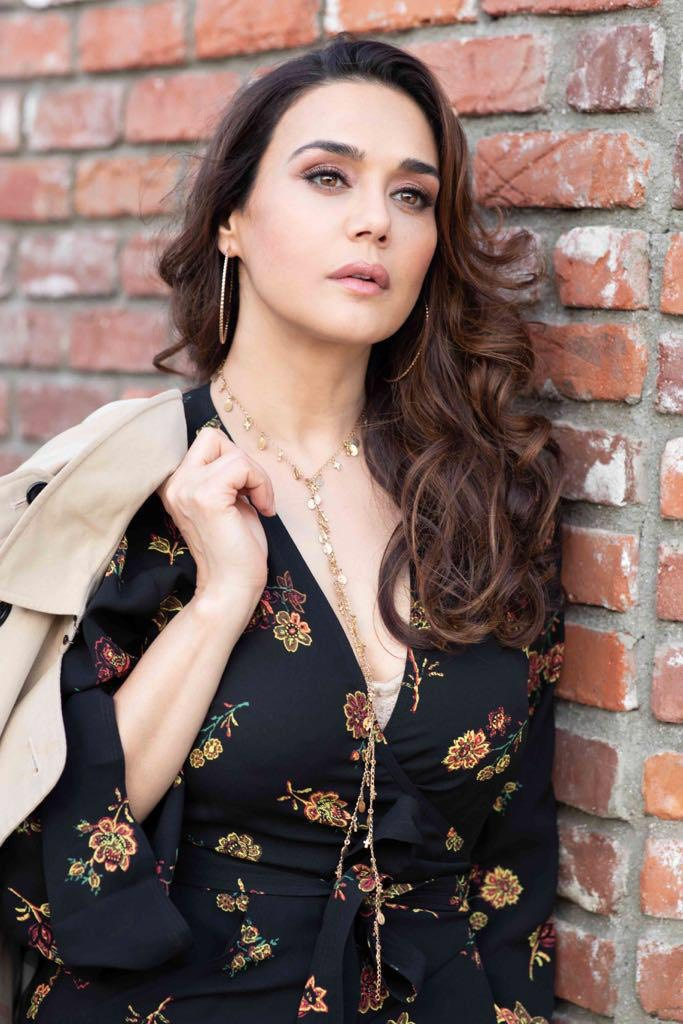
The performances of Manisha Koirala and Preity Zinta received critical acclaim; each received Filmfare Award nominations, with Zinta winning the Filmfare Award for Best Female Debut.

Though Dil Se.. received an average box office response in India, it found success overseas. It was screened at the Era New Horizons Film Festival and the Helsinki International Film Festival. The film went on to win the Netpac Award at the Berlin International Film Festival, two National Film Awards, and six Filmfare Awards. The intense political agenda of the film with the trials of the Assamese on the India-China border, the love story and the fact that it coincided with the 50th Independence Anniversary celebrations became a major factor for its success overseas, particularly amongst the South Asian diaspora in the west.

The film became the first Indian film to enter the top 10 in the United Kingdom box office charts. Even months after its release in September 1998, the film was still screened on five screens, five times per day with an average of 3,000 spectators across all screens in the Cineworld complex in Feltham, West London. Deepa Deosthalee wrote a positive review to the film, calling it "a picture-perfect ode to love" and praising the direction, writing and performances. Khalid Mohamed found the film disappointing, noting its "fine performances, technique and music" but panning its lack "of that crucial element called a story". Anupama Chopra of India Today wrote, "Amid the reels of tripe churned out by Bollywood every week, Dil Se... is a noble attempt. But coming from Mani, that's simply not good enough." The film was included in Time's "Best of Bollywood" list in 2010. Dil Se.. was also a hit in Japan.

=== Awards and nominations ===
Year	Award	Category	Recipients and nominees	Results
1999	49th Berlinale	Netpac Award	Mani Ratnam	Won
1999	46th National Film Awards	Best Cinematography	Santosh Sivan	Won
1999	46th National Film Awards	Best Audiography	H. Sridhar	Won
1999	44th Filmfare Awards	Best Female Debut	Preity Zinta	Won
1999	44th Filmfare Awards	Best Music Director	A. R. Rahman	Won
1999	44th Filmfare Awards	Best Lyricist	Gulzar for "Chaiyya Chaiyya"	Won
1999	44th Filmfare Awards	Best Male Playback Singer	Sukhwinder Singh for "Chaiyya Chaiyya"	Won
1999	44th Filmfare Awards	Best Cinematography	Santosh Sivan	Won
1999	44th Filmfare Awards	Best Choreography	Farah Khan for "Chaiyya Chaiyya"	Won
1999	44th Filmfare Awards	Best Actress	Manisha Koirala	Nominated
1999	44th Filmfare Awards	Best Supporting Actress	Preity Zinta	Nominated
1999	44th Filmfare Awards	Best Lyricist	Gulzar for "Ae Ajnabi"	Nominated
1999	44th Filmfare Awards	Best Female Playback Singer	Sapna Awasthi for "Chaiyya Chaiyya"	Nominated
1999	Screen Awards	Best Male Playback Singer	Sukhwinder Singh for "Chaiyya Chaiyya"	Won

== Bibliography ==
- Gopal, Sangita; Moorti, Sujata (2008). Global Bollywood: Travels of Hindi Song and Dance. U of Minnesota Press. ISBN 978-0-8166-4578-7.
