= Febi Mani =

Indian playback singer

- Born: Chennai, India
- Genres: Playback singing
- Occupation: Singer
- Years active: 1997–present

Febi Mani (also credited as Febi Srikanth Deva) is an Indian playback singer who has worked in the Indian film industry. She worked extensively with A. R. Rahman during the late 1990s and early 2000s, while also regularly collaborating with Harris Jayaraj.

== Career ==
Early in her career, Mani collaborated frequently with A. R. Rahman, working on big budget projects including for "Kokku Saiva Kokku" from K. S. Ravikumar's Muthu (1995), "Love Theme" from Shankar's Jeans (1998) and "Dil Se Re" in Mani Ratnam's Dil Se (1998). The Hindustan Times called "Strawberry Kanne" from Minsara Kanavu (1997), sung by Kay Kay and Febi Mani, "one of the most engaging tracks Rahman has ever composed", adding the musician employed "fabulous use of a motley assortment of instruments in the song that drove the story forward in the movie". Other notable early work by the singer included "Kanni Pengal" from the Ajith Kumar-starrer Kaadhal Mannan (1998), "Kikku Yerudhey" from Padayappa (1999) and "Oh Mariya" from Kadhalar Dhinam (1999).

After her marriage, Mani reduced her work commitments and has worked on film albums less often.

== Personal life ==
Mani married music director Srikanth Deva on 20 February 2005 in Chennai. The event was attended by several film personalities from the Tamil film industry including Rajinikanth, A. R. Rahman and Suriya, who were acquainted with either Mani, Srikanth or Srikanth's father, music composer Deva. Their first daughter, Varanya, was born in 2007.

== Notable discography ==
| Year | Film | Song title | Music director |
|---|---|---|---|
| 1995 | Muthu | "Kokku Saiva Kokku" | A. R. Rahman |
| 1997 | Bharathi Kannamma | "Chinna Chinna Kanamma" | Deva |
| 1997 | Minsara Kanavu | "Strawberry Kanne" | A. R. Rahman |
| 1998 | Kaadhal Mannan | "Kanni Pengal" | Bharadwaj |
| 1998 | Bavagaru Bagunnara? (Telugu) | "Maattekki Thooge" | Mani Sharma |
| 1998 | Jeans | "Love Theme" | A. R. Rahman |
| 1998 | Dil Se (Hindi) | "Dil Se Re" | A. R. Rahman |
| 1999 | Padayappa | "Kikku Yerudhey" | A. R. Rahman |
| 1999 | Kadhalar Dhinam | "Oh Mariya" | A. R. Rahman |
| 1999 | Kadhalar Dhinam - Telugu (D) | "Oh Mariya" | A. R. Rahman |
| 1999 | Taj Mahal | "Adi Manjakelange" | A. R. Rahman |
| 1999 | Taj Mahal | "Kizhakke Nandavanam" | A. R. Rahman |
| 2000 | Kadhalar Dhinam - Hindi (D) | "Oh Mariya" | A. R. Rahman |
| 2001 | 12B | "Jothi Neranjava" | Harris Jayaraj |
| 2001 | Majunu | "Hari Gori" | Harris Jayaraj |
| 2001 | Dumm Dumm Dumm | "Krishna Krishna" | Karthik Raja |
| 2001 | Paarthale Paravasam | "Paarthale Paravasam" | A. R. Rahman |
| 2001 | Hoo Anthiya Uhoo Anthiya (Kannada) | "Minchulli Kenne" | Karthik Raja |
| 2002 | Kannathil Muthamittal | "Vidai Kodu Engal Naadae" | A. R. Rahman |
| 2002 | Thulluvadho Ilamai | "Kaatrukku Kaatrukku" | Yuvan Shankar Raja |
| 2004 | M. Kumaran Son of Mahalakshmi | "Yaaru Yaaru Ivano" | Srikanth Deva |
| 2004 | Arasatchi | "Iruvathu Vayasu" | Harris Jayaraj |
| 2004 | Gharshana (Telugu) | "Aadatanamaa" | Harris Jayaraj |
| 2004 | Phir Milenge (Hindi) | "Phir Milenge" | Bhavatharini |
| 2004 | Jithan | "Coimbatore" | Srikanth Deva |
| 2005 | Ullam Ketkumae | "Kanavugal" | Harris Jayaraj |
| 2005 | Anniyan | "Stranger in Black" | Harris Jayaraj |
| 2009 | Peraanmai | "Thuppaaki Penne" | Vidyasagar |
