= Dil Se Re =

1998 song performed by A. R. Rahman

Song by A. R. Rahman

from the album Dil Se... soundtrack
- Released: 1998
- Studio: Panchathan Record Inn, Chennai, India
- Genre: Soundtrack
- Label: Venus
- Composer: A. R. Rahman
- Lyricist: Gulzar

"Dil Se Re" (transl. From the Heart) is a song from the film Dil Se.., composed by A. R. Rahman, lyrics penned by Gulzar, picturised on Shah Rukh Khan and Manisha Koirala and sung by A. R. Rahman. Anuradha Sriram, Anupama and Febi Mani were in the chorus.

The composition is based on Raga Jog (or Nattai in Carnatic), which was a chart topper of the year 1998 and this song's lyrics is said to be one of the finest and predominantly in Urdu. Guy Pratt, Pink Floyd bass guitarist for post Roger Waters albums Delicate Sound of Thunder, The Division Bell and Pulse played bass on this song.

The Tamil and Telugu versions of the same song are "Sandhosha Kanneere" from Uyire, and "Ninnele" from Prematho.
