= Dera Baba Murad Shah =

Sufi shrine in Nakodar, Jalandhar Punjab, India

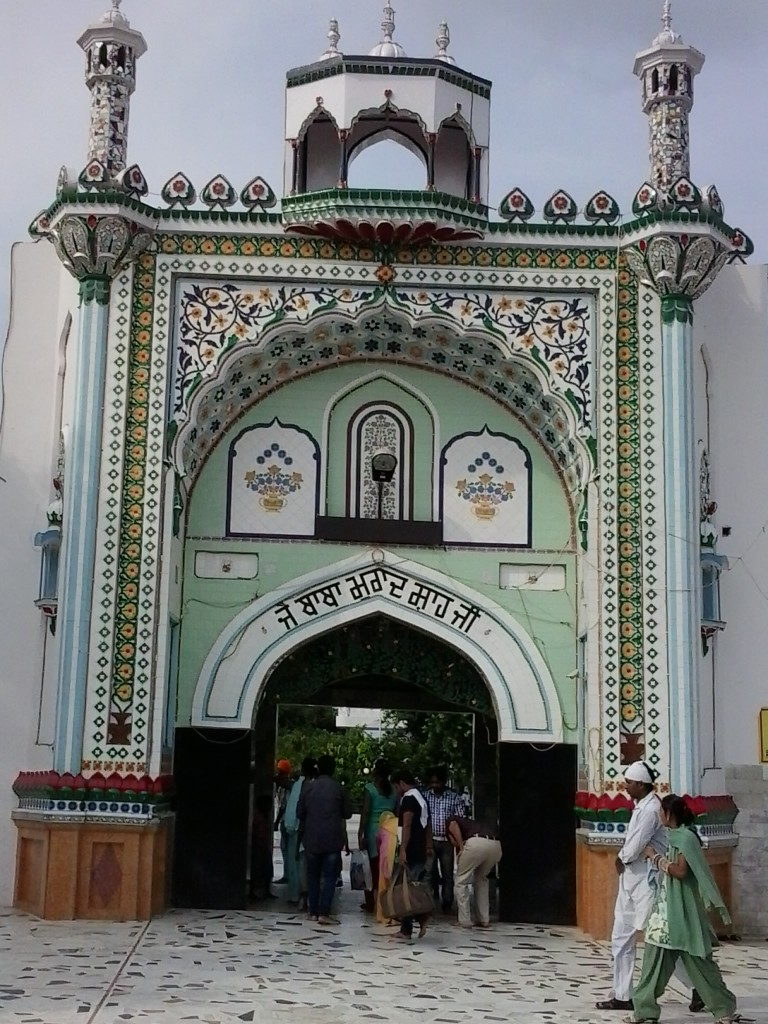
- Abbreviation: DBMS
- Established: 1960
- Founder: Baba Murad Shah
- Legal status: Active
- Purpose: Sufi shrine
- Location: Nakodar, Jalandhar District, Punjab, India
- Coordinates: 31.130104°N 75.473388°E
- Website: www.babamuradshah.com

Dera Baba Murad Shah is a Sufiyana Dargah located in Nakodar, Jalandhar District, Punjab, India.

== History ==
Baba Murad Shah became a disciple of Pir Baba Sher Shah. Sai Ghulam Shah also known as Laddi Shah became the head of the dargah after Baba Murad Shah died, until his own death on 1 May 2008.
