= Kuch Kuch Hota Hai =

1998 Indian film by Karan Johar

- Theatrical release poster
- Directed by: Karan Johar
- Written by: Karan Johar
- Produced by: Yash Johar
- Starring: Shah Rukh Khan; Kajol; Rani Mukerji; Salman Khan; Sana Saeed; Anupam Kher
- Cinematography: Santosh Thundiyil
- Edited by: Sanjay Sankla
- Music by: Jatin–Lalit
- Production company: Dharma Productions
- Distributed by: Yash Raj Films
- Release date: 16 October 1998
- Running time: 185 minutes
- Country: India
- Language: Hindi
- Budget: ₹10 crore
- Box office: est. ₹106.73 crore

Kuch Kuch Hota Hai (transl. Something Happens) is a 1998 Indian Hindi-language romantic comedy-drama film written and directed by Karan Johar (in his directorial debut) and produced by his father Yash Johar. It stars Shah Rukh Khan, Kajol, Rani Mukerji, Salman Khan and Sana Saeed. Set primarily across two time periods, the narrative follows the love-triangle between college friends Rahul, Anjali, and Tina. Years later, Rahul’s young daughter attempts to reunite him with his former best friend.

The film was shot in India, Mauritius, and Scotland, with Johar intending to bring a contemporary visual style to mainstream Hindi cinema. The soundtrack was composed by Jatin–Lalit, with lyrics by Sameer; it became the highest-selling Bollywood music album of the year.

Kuch Kuch Hota Hai was released theatrically on 16 October 1998, coinciding with the Diwali weekend. It received generally positive reviews from critics, who praised its direction, performances, music, cinematography, and emotional resonance. The film was a major commercial success, emerging as the highest-grossing Hindi film of 1998 in India and, at the time, the third highest-grossing Indian film overall. Internationally, it became the highest-grossing Hindi film ever until the release of Johar’s subsequent directorial, Kabhi Khushi Kabhie Gham (2001).

The film won numerous awards, including the National Film Award for Best Popular Film Providing Wholesome Entertainment. At the 44th Filmfare Awards, it won eight awards, including Best Film, Best Director, and all four acting categories (Best Actor, Best Actress, Best Supporting Actor, and Best Supporting Actress)—a distinction unmatched until Gully Boy (2019). It also received honors at the Screen Awards, Zee Cine Awards, and Bollywood Movie Awards. The film remains a landmark in Hindi cinema for its cultural impact, music, and fashion influence.

== Plot ==
Rahul is a single father to his daughter Anjali, named after his college best friend, Anjali Sharma. Rahul's wife, Tina, whom he met in college, died in childbirth eight years earlier. Unknown to Rahul, Tina left notes for Anjali recounting how she and Rahul met, and explaining that Sharma had been in love with Rahul during college, though he never reciprocated because he loved Tina. Believing Rahul and Sharma were meant to be together, Tina asks Young Anjali in her letters to reunite them.

Young Anjali attends a dance and music workshop in Shimla, where Sharma is an instructor. The two become close, but Sharma does not realise that Anjali is Rahul's daughter, having become estranged from Rahul and Tina after college. Rahul visits Shimla to check on Anjali and is shocked to find Sharma there. The former friends reunite, but their awkwardness prevents them from discussing their past feelings. Through Young Anjali's efforts, however, they gradually grow close again. Rahul is about to confess his feelings when Sharma's fiance, Aman, arrives at the camp.

Sharma chooses to proceed with her marriage to Aman rather than explore her feelings for Rahul. She leaves the camp to prepare for the wedding. Rahul and Young Anjali attend the ceremony, where Rahul meets Sharma on an upstairs terrace, declares his love, and leaves to find Young Anjali. Meanwhile, Anjali tells Aman about Rahul and Sharma's unrealised college romance.

At the altar, Sharma struggles to approach the pandal for the marriage rituals. Realising that she still loves Rahul, Aman calls off the wedding and asks Sharma to marry him instead, believing Rahul and Sharma are destined to be together. The festivities resume with Rahul as the groom. As they marry happily, Young Anjali imagines Tina proudly witnessing the fulfilment of her 'last wish' from her letter.

== Cast ==
- Shah Rukh Khan as Rahul Khanna
- Kajol as Anjali Sharma
- Rani Mukerji as Tina Malhotra
- Salman Khan as Aman Mehra
- Sana Saeed as Anjali Khanna, Tina and Rahul's daughter
- Farida Jalal as Mrs. Khanna, Rahul's mother
- Anupam Kher as Mr. Malhotra, College principal and Tina's father
- Reema Lagoo as Mrs. Sharma, Anjali's mother
- Archana Puran Singh as Ms. Braganza
- Himani Shivpuri as Rifat Bi
- Johnny Lever as Colonel Joshua Almeida, Summer Camp Manager
- Parzan Dastur as Jasdeep Singh
- Neelam Kothari as Neelam (special appearance)
- Nikkhil Advani in Neelam's talk show segment (special appearance)
- Manish Malhotra as a college student sitting on the steps of college when Anjali Sharma wears feminine clothing (special appearance)
- Farah Khan as herself in Neelam's talk show and sitting on the steps of college when Anjali wears feminine clothing (special appearance)
- Geeta Kapoor as herself in the song "Tujhe Yaad Na Meri Aayee" (special appearance)

== Production ==
=== Development ===
After assisting and acting in Aditya Chopra's Dilwale Dulhania Le Jayenge (1995), Karan Johar was inspired to direct his own film. For Kuch Kuch Hota Hai, he aimed to reunite Shah Rukh Khan and Kajol in a romance film. Johar initially developed two separate storylines: one involving a college love triangle between a tomboy, a popular girl, and an insensitive boy; the other centered on a widower and his child. Dissatisfied with both, he merged them into a single narrative. In an interview with Rediff.com, he explained: "It was about the trauma of a widower and his little child... Then I thought: Why not bring a youth aspect to the story? Why not a flashback? That's how the story got made."

Johar cited the 1995 British romantic comedy Jack and Sarah as an influence for the film's second half. He also stated in his 2017 autobiography An Unsuitable Boy that he wanted Khan to portray a role he had not attempted before, leading to the decision to cast him as a father. Others have noted thematic similarities with the Tom Hanks starrer Sleepless in Seattle (1993).

Johar has acknowledged retrospective criticism regarding the film’s portrayal of gender roles. He recalled that actress Shabana Azmi criticized a scene suggesting that a woman becomes desirable only after altering her appearance, particularly referencing Anjali's transformation when she grows her hair.

To construct a stylish and aspirational college environment, Johar collaborated with costume designer Manish Malhotra. They sourced outfits from London, prominently featuring international brands such as DKNY and Polo. The visual design of the college setting was heavily inspired by Western pop culture, including the television series Beverly Hills, 90210 and the Archie Comics. Johar instructed art director Sharmishta Roy to model the campus on Riverdale High, later stating: "Shah Rukh plays Archie, Rani Mukerji plays Veronica, and Kajol played Betty."

The production team included Farah Khan as choreographer, Jatin–Lalit as music composers, Santosh Thundiyil as cinematographer, and Nikkhil Advani as associate director. Shabina Khan assisted Malhotra with costume design.

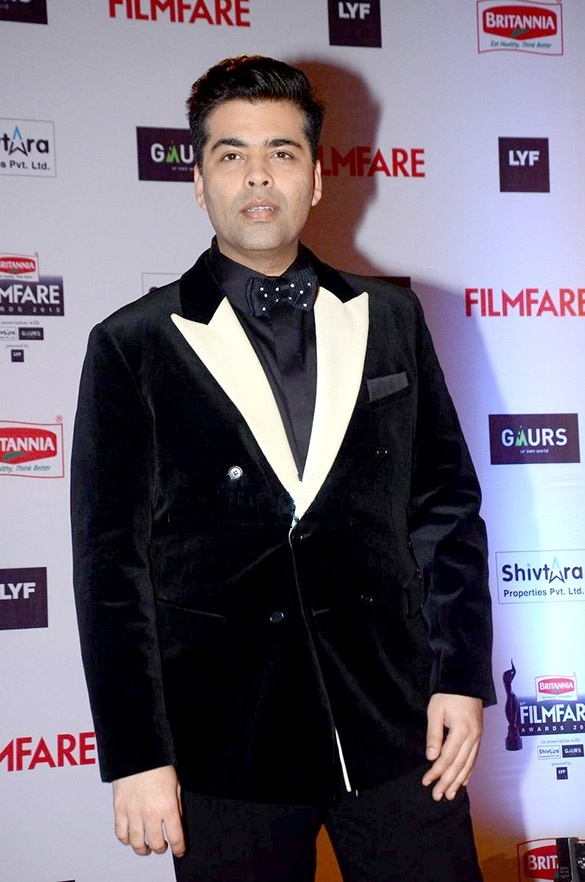
The film marked Karan Johar's directorial debut

=== Casting ===
Johar was certain about casting Shah Rukh Khan and Kajol in the lead roles. The role of Tina, however, proved more difficult to fill. It was initially written for Twinkle Khanna, who declined the offer. Other actresses, including Aishwarya Rai, Raveena Tandon, Tabu, Urmila Matondkar, Shilpa Shetty, and Karisma Kapoor, were also approached but turned it down. Aditya Chopra recommended Rani Mukerji (Kajol's cousin), after watching her performance in Raja Ki Aayegi Baaraat (1996), and Johar subsequently cast her in the role.

The character of Aman Mehra was initially offered to Saif Ali Khan, Bobby Deol and Chandrachur Singh, all of whom declined. Salman Khan accepted the role following a meeting with Johar at the home of his sister, Alvira Khan Agnihotri. Although there were initial concerns regarding his remuneration, he eventually agreed to join the cast, completing the film's principal ensemble.

=== Filming ===
Principal photography commenced on 21 August 1997 and lasted for approximately nine and a half months. The film was shot across multiple international and domestic locations. The college scenes were filmed at the University of Mauritius in Moka, while the summer camp sequences, set in Shimla, were filmed at Wenlock Downs in Ooty, Tamil Nadu. The title song was shot over ten days in various scenic locations in Scotland, including Eilean Donan Castle, Glen Coe, Loch Lomond, and Tantallon Castle.

Due to the relative inexperience of the crew, Shah Rukh Khan frequently assisted with technical aspects during filming. Johar later acknowledged his own limited knowledge of direction and production techniques at the time. During the filming of the song "Yeh Ladka Hai Deewana", Kajol lost control of her bicycle, resulting in a fall that injured her knee and rendered her briefly unconscious. She later described the accident as her most memorable moment from the shoot, as she had no recollection of it.

For the emotional reunion scene between Rahul and Anjali after eight years, Johar encouraged the actors to rehearse and improvise their reactions. He secretly recorded the rehearsal and was so impressed by the result that he included the footage in the final cut of the film.

== Soundtrack ==
Kuch Kuch Hota Hai

Soundtrack album by Jatin–Lalit
- Released: 19 August 1998
- Genre: Feature film soundtrack
- Label: Sony Music
- Producer: Jatin–Lalit

The soundtrack for Kuch Kuch Hota Hai was composed by Jatin–Lalit, with lyrics written by Sameer. It marked the duo’s first collaboration with director Karan Johar and was released by Sony Music on 19 August 1998. Initially, lyricist Javed Akhtar was contracted to write the songs and had completed one track, “Koi Mil Gaya.” However, upon learning the film's title, he objected, describing it as “mediocre, obscene, and vulgar.” Akhtar subsequently withdrew from the project. He later expressed regret over his decision, acknowledging the film’s popularity and cultural impact.

The album became the highest-selling Bollywood soundtrack of 1998, with an estimated eight million units sold in India. The title song remained on the Indian music charts for over a year, and the album peaked at number two on the Malaysian Albums Chart (RIM) in 1999. Sony Music Indonesia reported additional sales of 300,000 units, bringing combined sales in India and Indonesia to approximately 8.3 million.

In a 2012 audience poll conducted by NDTV, the title track was voted the most popular Hindi film song of the preceding decade. In a similar poll conducted by the BBC, the full soundtrack ranked second, behind that of Dilwale Dulhania Le Jayenge (1995), which was also composed by Jatin–Lalit.

No.	Title	Singer(s)	Length
1.	"Kuch Kuch Hota Hai"	Udit Narayan, Alka Yagnik	4:56
2.	"Koi Mil Gaya"	Kavita Krishnamurthy, Udit Narayan, Alka Yagnik	7:16
3.	"Saajanji Ghar Aaye"	Kumar Sanu, Alka Yagnik, Kavita Krishnamurthy	7:14
4.	"Kuch Kuch Hota Hai (Sad)"	Alka Yagnik	1:26
5.	"Raghupati Raghav"	Alka Yagnik, Shankar Mahadevan	2:05
6.	"Tujhe Yaad Na Meri Aayee"	Alka Yagnik, Manpreet Akhtar, Udit Narayan	7:05
7.	"Ladki Badi Anjaani Hai"	Kumar Sanu, Alka Yagnik	6:23
8.	"Yeh Ladka Hai Deewana"	Udit Narayan, Alka Yagnik	6:36
Total length:			42:59

In 2002, Sony Music India also released Kuch Kuch Hota Hai in Sinhala version.

No.	Title	Singer(s)	Length
1.	"Thummansaledi" (Kuch Kuch Hota Hai – Title Track)	Mohini Singh, Noel Raj	4:57
2.	"Pemphata Pura" (Koi Mil Gaya)	Anuradha Sri Ram, Noel Raj	7:17
3.	"Banda Thoran Ran" (Saaanji Ghar Aaye)	Anuradha Perera, Sangeeth Wijesooriya
4.	"Thummansaledi" (Sad Version)	Champa Kalhari	1:26
5.	"Hangila Ara Moko" (Yeh Ladka Hai Deewana)	Anuradha Perera, Sangeeth Wijesooriya	6:38
6.	"Me Jeewithayen Pala Ne" (Tujhe Yaad Na Meri Aaye)	Anuradha Perera, Sangeeth Wijesooriya	6:06
7.	"Khsithija Ime" (Ladki Badi Anjaani Hai)	Anuradha Perera, Noel Raj	5:55
Total length:			39:37

== Reception ==
=== Critical reception ===
Kuch Kuch Hota Hai received generally positive reviews upon its release, with praise for its lead performances, emotional resonance, and youthful tone.

Katherine Singh of Refinery29 described it as “a love triangle for the ages,” adding that the film “still holds up” decades later for its blend of youthful nostalgia, strong performances, and iconic fashion.

In India, Nikhat Kazmi of The Times of India gave the film 3.5 out of 5 stars, calling it a sentimental romance with “MTV ambience” and “Valentine's Day flavours.” She especially praised Kajol’s performance, while noting that “the second half gets drowned in a sea of emotions. Too many people begin to cry a bit too much.”

Nandita Chowdhury of India Today described the film as “slick, urbane and predictable,” but appreciated Karan Johar’s ability to nearly recreate the chemistry of Shah Rukh Khan and Kajol from Dilwale Dulhania Le Jayenge (1995). She concluded it was “a good distraction” that would resonate with its target youth audience.

Conversely, Sujata C. J. of Rediff.com criticized the film’s overuse of clichés and sentimental storytelling, though she praised Santosh Thundiyil’s cinematography and Sharmishta Roy’s art direction for elevating its visual appeal.

Common Sense Media gave the film a favorable retrospective review, highlighting its “sweet and wholesome story of friendship and love,” though it noted that certain cultural references may be less accessible to international audiences.

=== Box office ===
Kuch Kuch Hota Hai was a major commercial success, becoming the highest-grossing Hindi film of 1998 in both domestic and international markets. It was also the third highest-grossing Indian film of the 1990s, behind Hum Aapke Hain Koun..! (1994) and Dilwale Dulhania Le Jayenge (1995).

According to Box Office India, the film grossed ₹80.12 crore (US$19.4 million) in India and $6.3 million (₹26.61 crore) overseas, for a worldwide total of approximately ₹106.7 crore (US$25.7 million), against a production budget of ₹10 crore (US$2.4 million). It earned ₹8.06 crore (US$1.95 million) globally in its opening weekend and ₹15.13 crore (US$3.7 million) in its first week.

==== India ====
The film was released on 16 October 1998 across 240 screens, alongside Bade Miyan Chote Miyan. It collected ₹87 lakh (US$211,000) nett on its opening day and ₹2.74 crore (US$664,000) nett during the opening weekend. In its first week, it earned ₹5.64 crore (US$1.37 million) nett, the second-highest of the year after Bade Miyan Chote Miyan.

Kuch Kuch Hota Hai went on to gross ₹46.86 crore (US$11.4 million) nett in India, with a distributor share of ₹29.88 crore (US$7.2 million). It was declared an "All-Time Blockbuster" by Box Office India and became the highest-grossing Hindi film of the year.

==== Overseas ====
The film had a strong debut in international markets, earning $800,000 (₹3.38 crore) during its opening weekend and $1.3 million (₹5.49 crore) in its first week. It became the first Bollywood film to cross the $5 million mark overseas, eventually grossing $6.3 million (₹26.61 crore).

According to the book Global Bollywood, its total overseas earnings reached $8 million. It became the second Bollywood film to enter the UK box office Top 10, following Dil Se.. (1998), and grossed $2 million in the United Kingdom. In Indonesia, the film reportedly outperformed Titanic at the Indonesian box office during its theatrical run.

== Accolades ==
At the 44th Filmfare Awards, Kuch Kuch Hota Hai received a leading 18 nominations and won 8 awards, including Best Film, Best Director, Best Actor, and Best Actress. It became the third film in Filmfare history to win all four top awards, following Guide (1965) and Dilwale Dulhania Le Jayenge (1995). Subsequent films to achieve the same distinction include Devdas (2002), Black (2005), and Gully Boy (2019).

Award	Date of the ceremony	Category	Recipients	Result	Ref.
Screen Awards	January 1999	Best Film	Kuch Kuch Hota Hai	Won	
Screen Awards	January 1999	Best Director	Karan Johar	Won	
Screen Awards	January 1999	Best Actor	Shah Rukh Khan	Nominated	
Screen Awards	January 1999	Best Actress	Kajol	Nominated	
Screen Awards	January 1999	Best Comedian	Archana Puran Singh	Won	
Screen Awards	January 1999	Best Music Director	Jatin–Lalit	Won	
Filmfare Awards	21 February 1999	Best Film	Kuch Kuch Hota Hai	Won	
Filmfare Awards	21 February 1999	Best Director	Karan Johar	Won	
Filmfare Awards	21 February 1999	Best Actor	Shah Rukh Khan	Won	
Filmfare Awards	21 February 1999	Best Actress	Kajol	Won	
Filmfare Awards	21 February 1999	Best Supporting Actor	Salman Khan	Won	
Filmfare Awards	21 February 1999	Best Supporting Actress	Rani Mukerji	Won	
Filmfare Awards	21 February 1999	Best Performance in a Comic Role	Anupam Kher	Nominated	
Filmfare Awards	21 February 1999	Best Performance in a Comic Role	Archana Puran Singh	Nominated	
Filmfare Awards	21 February 1999	Best Performance in a Comic Role	Johnny Lever	Nominated	
Filmfare Awards	21 February 1999	Best Music Director	Jatin–Lalit	Nominated	
Filmfare Awards	21 February 1999	Best Lyricist	Sameer for "Kuch Kuch Hota Hai"	Nominated	
Filmfare Awards	21 February 1999	Best Lyricist	Sameer for "Ladki Badi Anjaani Hai"	Nominated	
Filmfare Awards	21 February 1999	Best Male Playback Singer	Kumar Sanu for "Ladki Badi Anjaani Hai"	Nominated	
Filmfare Awards	21 February 1999	Best Male Playback Singer	Udit Narayan for "Kuch Kuch Hota Hai"	Nominated	
Filmfare Awards	21 February 1999	Best Female Playback Singer	Alka Yagnik for "Kuch Kuch Hota Hai"	Nominated	
Filmfare Awards	21 February 1999	Best Female Playback Singer	Alka Yagnik for "Ladki Badi Anjaani Hai"	Nominated	
Filmfare Awards	21 February 1999	Best Screenplay	Karan Johar	Won	
Filmfare Awards	21 February 1999	Best Art Direction	Sharmishta Roy	Won	
Zee Cine Awards	14 March 1999	Best Film	Kuch Kuch Hota Hai	Won	
Zee Cine Awards	14 March 1999	Best Director	Karan Johar	Won	
Zee Cine Awards	14 March 1999	Best Actor – Male	Shah Rukh Khan	Won	
Zee Cine Awards	14 March 1999	Best Actor – Female	Kajol	Won	
Zee Cine Awards	14 March 1999	Best Actor in a Supporting Role – Female	Rani Mukerji	Won	
Zee Cine Awards	14 March 1999	Best Music Director	Jatin–Lalit	Won	
Zee Cine Awards	14 March 1999	Best Lyricist	Sameer for "Kuch Kuch Hota Hai"	Won	
Zee Cine Awards	14 March 1999	Best Playback Singer – Female	Alka Yagnik for "Kuch Kuch Hota Hai"	Won	
Zee Cine Awards	14 March 1999	Lux Face of the Year	Rani Mukerji (also for Ghulam)	Won	
Zee Cine Awards	14 March 1999	Best Story	Karan Johar	Won	
Bollywood Movie Awards	May 1999	Best Film	Kuch Kuch Hota Hai	Won	
Bollywood Movie Awards	May 1999	Best Director	Karan Johar	Won	
Bollywood Movie Awards	May 1999	Best Actor	Shah Rukh Khan	Won	
Bollywood Movie Awards	May 1999	Best Actress	Kajol	Won	
Bollywood Movie Awards	May 1999	Best Music Director	Jatin–Lalit	Won	
Bollywood Movie Awards	May 1999	Best Male Playback Singer	Udit Narayan for "Kuch Kuch Hota Hai"	Won	
Bollywood Movie Awards	May 1999	Best Female Playback Singer	Alka Yagnik for "Kuch Kuch Hota Hai"	Won	
Bollywood Movie Awards	May 1999	Best Screenplay	Karan Johar	Won	
Bollywood Movie Awards	May 1999	Best Choreography	Farah Khan for "Koi Mil Gaya"	Won	
Bollywood Movie Awards	May 1999	Best Costume Design	Manish Malhotra	Won	
Sansui Viewers' Choice Movie Awards	17 November 1999	Best Actor	Shah Rukh Khan	Won	
Sansui Viewers' Choice Movie Awards	17 November 1999	Best Actress	Kajol	Won	
Sansui Viewers' Choice Movie Awards	17 November 1999	Best Supporting Actress	Rani Mukerji	Won	
Sansui Viewers' Choice Movie Awards	17 November 1999	Best Child Artist	Sana Saeed	Won	
National Film Awards	15 February 2000	Best Popular Film Providing Wholesome Entertainment	Kuch Kuch Hota Hai	Won	
National Film Awards	15 February 2000	Best Female Playback Singer	Alka Yagnik for "Kuch Kuch Hota Hai"	Won	

== Legacy ==
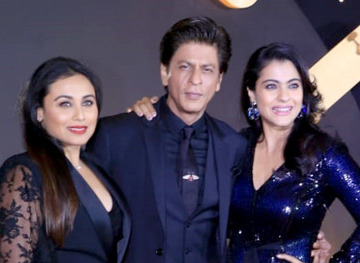
Rani Mukerji, Shah Rukh Khan, Kajol during the 20th anniversary celebration of the film.

Kuch Kuch Hota Hai has been the subject of extensive critical analysis and cultural commentary since its release. Film critic Subhash K. Jha described it as "a simple, stylish, sensuous and ambrosial love story," highlighting the chemistry between the lead actors as "unbeatable." A reviewer for Time Out Film Guide noted that while the second love triangle extended the narrative, the film's performances, cinematography, storytelling, and musical numbers were "energetically colourful." In 2004, Meor Shariman of Malay Mail called the film a “must-watch” for both Bollywood enthusiasts and newcomers. Conversely, some critics have pointed out the film's portrayal of idealized characters and settings; director Karan Johar has acknowledged this, stating that the film was intended as a form of escapism.

The film's enduring popularity has led to various homages in Indian cinema. The 2012 romantic comedy Shirin Farhad Ki Toh Nikal Padi featured promotional materials and a musical number, "Ramba Mein Samba," that paid tribute to Kuch Kuch Hota Hai. In 2010, Time magazine included the film in its list of "Five Essential Bollywood Movies to Netflix," recognizing its significance in the genre. Critic Shubhra Gupta also featured the film in her book 50 Films That Changed Bollywood, 1995–2015, citing its impact on the industry's narrative and stylistic approaches.

In 2018, Johar hosted a commemorative event in Mumbai to commemorate the 20th anniversary of Kuch Kuch Hota Hai, attended by lead actors Shah Rukh Khan, Kajol, and Rani Mukerji. During the event, the cast shared memories from the production, and Khan humorously admitted that he initially found the script confusing but agreed to do the film out of faith in Johar’s vision.

Johar had expressed interest in creating an animated adaptation of the film; however, as of October 2012, the project was placed on indefinite hold due to the limited success of animated films in the Indian market.

In January 2023, IndieWire ranked Kuch Kuch Hota Hai as the top romantic comedy available on Netflix globally, ahead of titles like Scott Pilgrim vs. the World (2010) and Notting Hill (1999). Critics Kate Erbland and Alison Foreman described it as "a bittersweet and bubbly story of young love, missed opportunity, and female friendship," noting its memorable "romantic gazebo scene."

The film is frequently cited as a cultural touchstone in Hindi cinema, influencing fashion trends, musical compositions, and contemporary romantic storytelling. It was ranked 46th in Time Out's list of "The 100 Best Bollywood Movies," praised as "a landmark of '90s Bollywood" for its emotional depth and widespread appeal. In a 2012 audience poll by NDTV, the title track was voted the most popular Hindi film song of the preceding decade, while a BBC poll ranked the soundtrack second among Bollywood albums, following Dilwale Dulhania Le Jayenge (1995).

== Home media and streaming ==
The film was subsequently released on VHS and DVD formats in India and overseas markets. A Blu-ray edition was issued on 19 February 2011, containing a restored print in 1080p resolution and DTS-HD Master Audio 5.1 sound.

== See also ==
- List of highest-grossing Indian films in overseas markets
- Hiyy Halaaku, a 2000 Maldivian remake
