= Basgo Monastery =

Buddhist monastery in northern India

Coordinates: 34°13′12″N 77°16′48″E

Basgo monastery
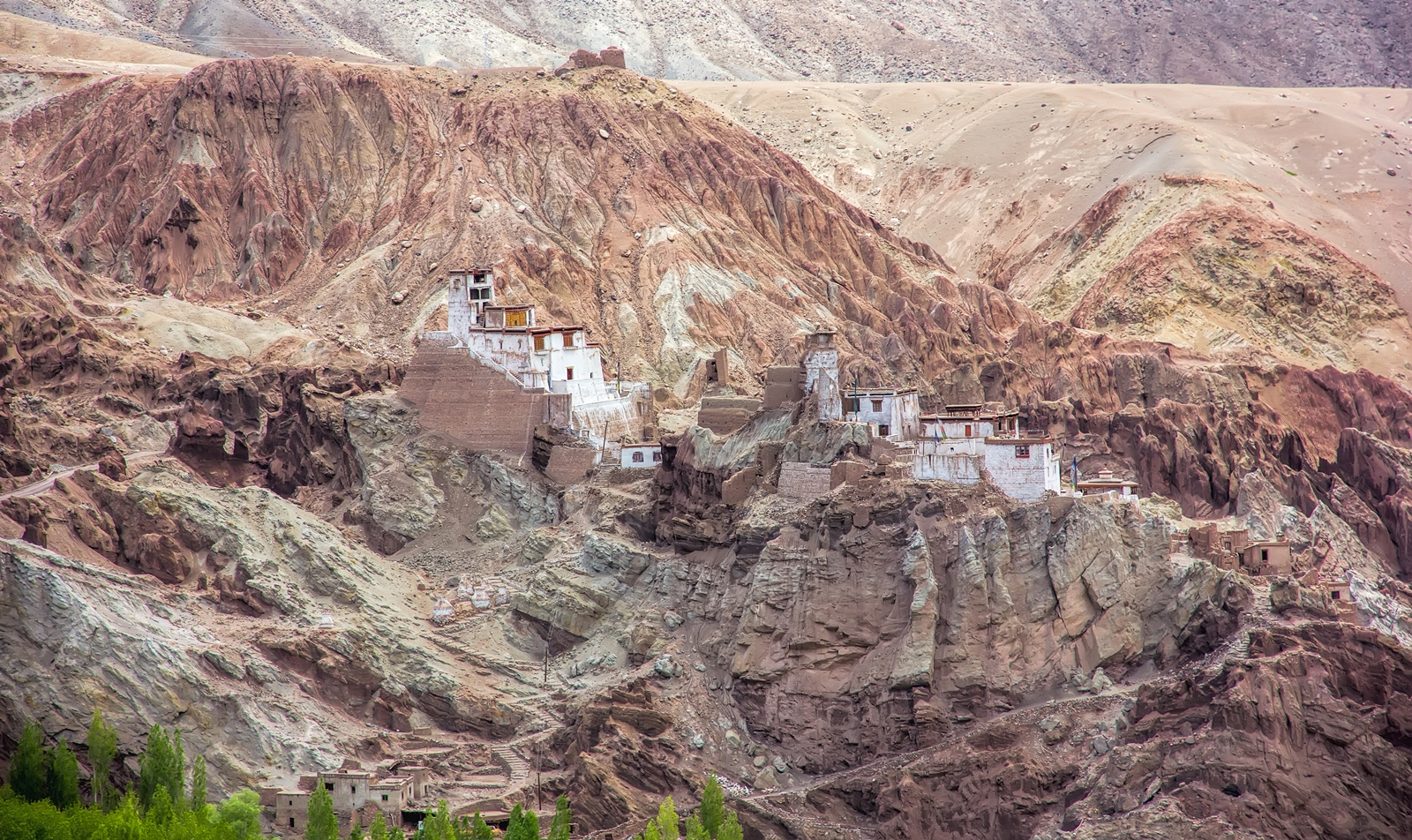
- Basgo monastery

Religion
- Affiliation: Tibetan Buddhism
- Sect: Nyingma

Location
- Location: Basgo, Leh district Ladakh, India
- Country: India
- Interactive map of Basgo monastery

Architecture
- Founder: Namgyal dynasty of Ladakh
- Established: 1680; 346 years ago

Basgo Monastery, also known as Basgo or Bazgo Gompa, is a Buddhist monastery located in Basgo or Bazgo on the bank of Indus River in Leh District of Ladakh in northern India approximately 5 km west of Nimoo and 40 km east from Leh. Although the monastery was built for the Namgyal rulers in 1680, Bazgo itself was embedded in the early days of Ladakh and is frequently mentioned in the Ladakhi Chronicles when it was a political and cultural center. In the 15th century, a palace was built in Basgo.

The monastery is situated on top of the hill towering over the ruins of the ancient town and is noted for its Buddha statue and murals. The complex comprises the Chamchung, Chamba Lakhang, and Serzang temples, dedicated to the Maitreya Buddha.

== Photo Gallery ==
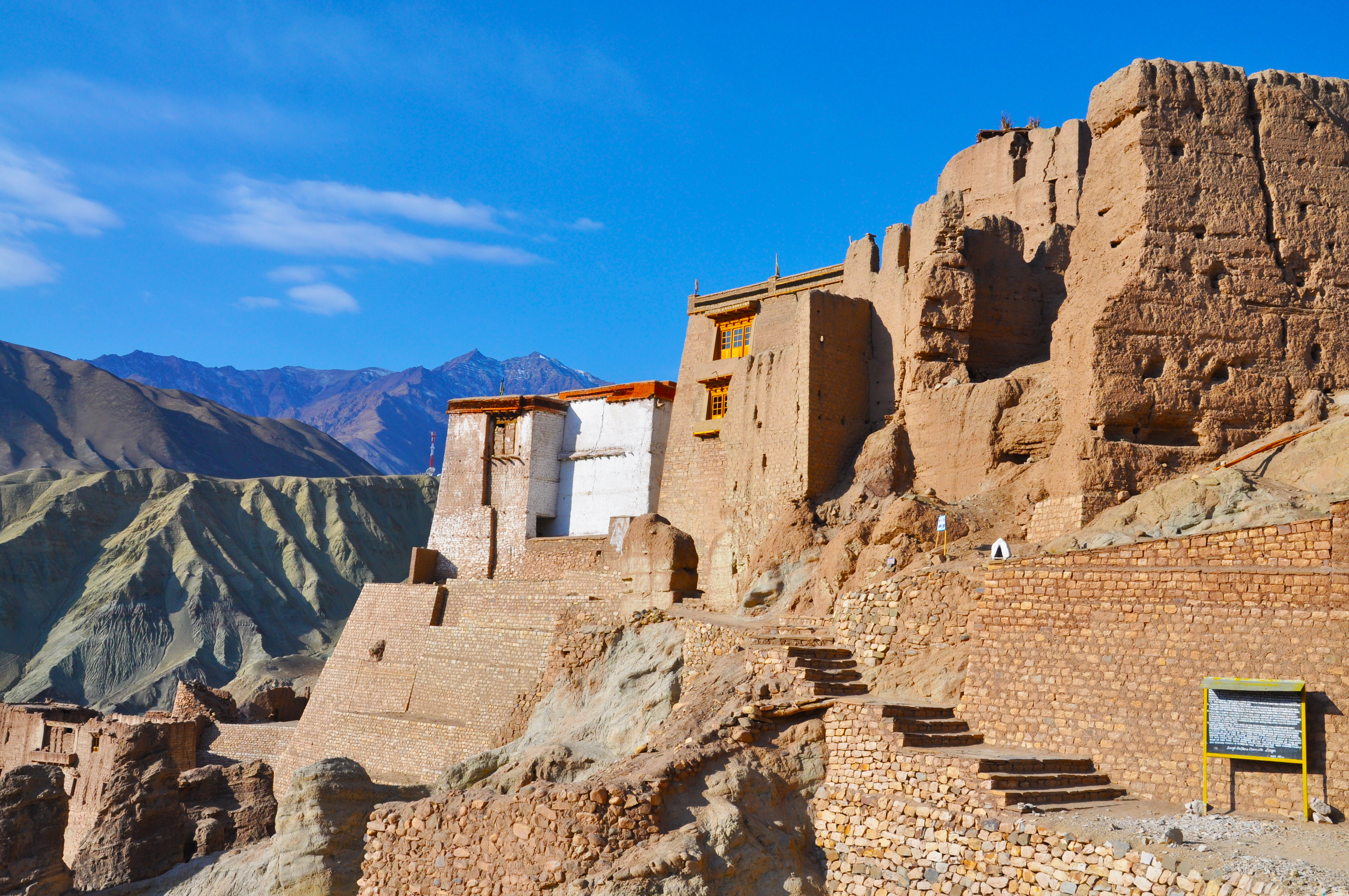
Basgo Monastery, Leh, India

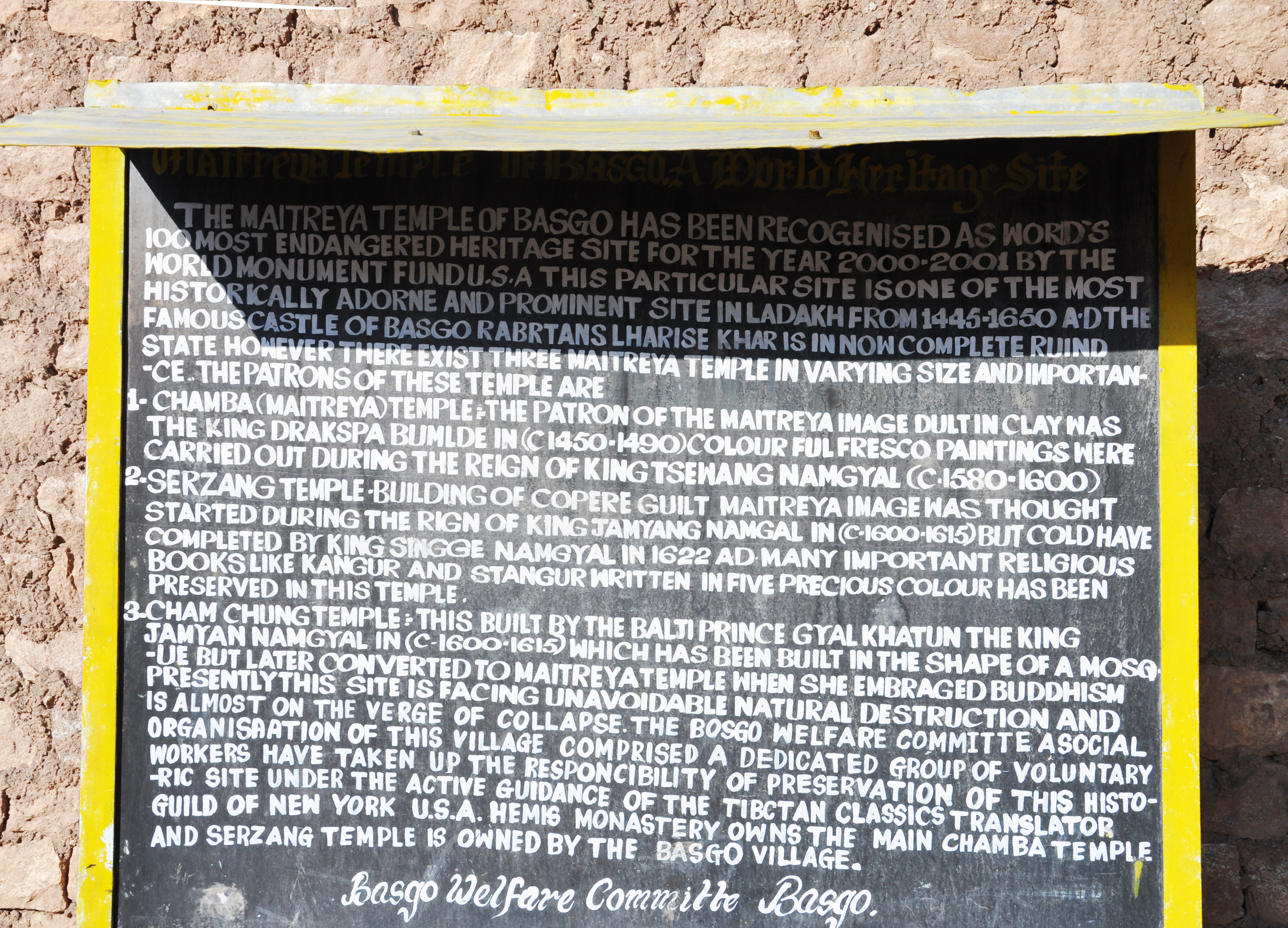
Basgo Monastery Information Board

== See also ==
- List of buddhist monasteries in Ladakh
- Tourism in Ladakh
