= Manpreet Akhtar =

Indian folk singer (1965–2016)

- Born: 1961; Kotkapura, Punjab, India
- Died: 16 January 2016 (aged 54–55); Patiala, Punjab, India
- Other name: Manpreet Akhter
- Occupation: Singer
- Notable work: Tujhe Yaad Na Meri Aayi (1998)
- Relatives: Dilshad Akhtar (brother)

Manpreet Akhtar (1961 – 16 January 2016) was an Indian singer of Punjabi folk music, who also worked as a playback singer in Bollywood films. She is known for her classical singing style, some of her songs include "Beriye ni", "Nikdi Sui", "Bas Ik Gerha Gidhe Vich" and the Bollywood song "Tujhe Yaad Na Meri Aayee" from the film Kuch Kuch Hota Hai (1998). She was the sister of singer Dilshad Akhtar.

== Personal life ==
Manpreet Akhtar was born in 1965 to her father, Keere Khan Shaukin, into a family of singers in Kotkapura, Punjab, India. She was the sister of Dilshad Akhtar, and Gurranditta, she had two sons Naved and Lavid Akhtar, all of them singers.

Her father Shaukin, and her maternal uncle Sabar Hussain Sabar are considered as pioneers of Punjabi singing.

Akhtar and her brother Gurranditta, were trained under Pandit Krishan Kant at Barjindra Government College, Faridkot. Initially, Gurranditta joined the Food Corporation of India while Akhtar joined Jawahar Navodaya Vidyalaya before shifting to a government school in Patiala as a music teacher. But after their brother Dilshad Akhtar was shot dead in 1995, the siblings were persuaded by fellow singers to continue the family tradition.

== Selected discography ==
Punjabi songs

- "Beriye Ni"
- "Nikdi Sui"
- "Bas Ik Gerha Gidhe Vich"

Hindi film songs

- "Tujhe Yaad Na Meri Aayi" – Kuch Kuch Hota Hai (1998)

== Death ==
Manpreet Akhtar died on 16 january 2016, at the age of 55 due to a brain haemorrhage at a hospital in Patiala.

Following her death, several public figures expressed condolences, including Punjab Deputy Chief Minister Sukhbir Singh Badal, who acknowledged her contributions to Punjabi folk music and the film industry.
