= Tujhe Yaad Na Meri Aayee =

Hindi language song (1998)

Song by Manpreet Akhtar Alka Yagnik Udit Narayan

from the album Kuch Kuch Hota Hai
- Released: 1998
- Genre: Bollywood

"Tujhe Yaad Na Meri Aayee" (lit. 'You did not remember me') is a song from the 1998 Indian Hindi-language romantic comedy-drama film Kuch Kuch Hota Hai, directed by Karan Johar. The song was recreated in 2023.

== Recreation ==
The song was recreated in 2023 by B Praak, Jaani, and Jatin–Lalit, and it peaked at number 23 on the Official Asian Music Chart.
