= Bigil (soundtrack) =

2019 soundtrack album by A. R. Rahman

- Soundtrack album cover

Soundtrack album by A. R. Rahman
- Released: 27 September 2019
- Recorded: 2019
- Studios: Panchathan Record Inn and AM Studios, Chennai; KM Music Conservatory, Chennai
- Genre: Feature film soundtrack
- Length: 26:35
- Language: Tamil
- Label: Sony Music India
- Producer: A. R. Rahman

A. R. Rahman chronology
Sarvam Thaala Mayam (2019)	Bigil (2019)	99 Songs (2019)
External audio
- Audio Jukebox on YouTube

Singles from Bigil
- 1. "Singappenney" Released: 23 July 2019; 2. "Verithanam" Released: 1 September 2019; 3. "Unakaaga" Released: 18 September 2019

Bigil is the soundtrack album, composed by A. R. Rahman, to the 2019 Indian Tamil-language sports action film of the same name, directed by Atlee, starring Vijay. The soundtrack album consists of 5 songs, with 2 bonus tracks, all of them were penned by lyricist Vivek. The soundtrack album was released digitally on 27 September 2019, through the Sony Music India record label.

== Production ==
The soundtrack and background score was composed by A. R. Rahman, marking his second collaboration with Atlee after Mersal, and also his fifth and final collaboration with Vijay, after Udhaya, Azhagiya Tamil Magan, Mersal and Sarkar. The album features five songs with lyrics written by Vivek. The music rights of the film were acquired by Sony Music India. Actor Vijay, sung one song titled "Verithanam" which was confirmed by a poster release on 8 July 2019. This is the first time Vijay, has sung for a film composed by Rahman.

I have composed for sports genre films in Hollywood, but this would be the first time in South India. Atlee is a fan of my films like Lagaan and Pele. He's heard these soundtracks and he is musically very passionate. I enjoy working with such director who gets involved in music composing.

— A. R. Rahman on composing music for Bigil in an interview with Hindustan Times

A song from the film "Singappenney" was unofficially leaked through the internet on mid-July 2019; and following this, the song was officially released on 23 July 2019, as the film's first single. The music video features Rahman and Shashaa Tirupati, rendering the song while lyricist Vivek and Atlee also made an appearance. Singapenney, considered to be a woman anthem, Vivek, who wrote the lyrics, stated that "This is a woman anthem, dedicated to mother, sister, wife and all women in the world" while also noting that "the song will change the stereotype of a woman, which considers that the stronger themes were denoted for men and the softer themes were denoted for women".

The second single track "Verithanam" was released on 1 September 2019, it is a peppy introduction dance number sung by Vijay. The lyrical video crossed 1 million likes within few days of its release, thus becoming the first South Indian lyric video to achieve this record. The third single "Unakkaga" was released on 18 September 2019, sung by Sreekanth Hariharan and Madhura Dhara Talluri, it is a melodious number. The other songs were "Maathare" sung by Chinmayi, Madhura Dhara Talluri, Sireesha, Akshara and Vithusayni, and "Bigil Bigil Bigiluma" an instrumental track.

== Release ==
The film's music was released at the audio launch event held on 27 September 2019 at Sai Leo Muthu Indoor Stadium, Sri Sai Ram Engineering College, Chennai, with the presence of the film's cast and crew and all the other celebrities. Nayanthara did not attend the audio launch, the event was hosted by Mirchi Siva and Ramya Subramanian. Rahman and his musical team gave a stage performance at the audio launch. The audio launch was telecasted through Sun TV on 29 September 2019. The songs were released at all digital platforms, the very same day, of the launch.

A month after the film's release, an album with two additional songs was released. While these two songs are also written by Vivek, the song "Kaalame" was sung by Bamba Bakya, while the song "Idharkuthaan" was sung by Dhee with additional vocals from Sunitha Sarathy and Arjun Chandy.

== Track listing ==
=== Tamil ===
All lyrics are written by Vivek.

Track listing
No.	Title	Singer(s)	Length
1.	"Singappenney"	A. R. Rahman, Shashaa Tirupati	6:04
2.	"Verithanam"	Vijay	4:05
3.	"Unakaga"	Sreekanth Hariharan, Madhura Dhara Talluri	4:26
4.	"Maatharey"	Chinmayi, Madhura Dhara Talluri, Sireesha, Akshara, Vithusayni	4:21
5.	"Bigil Bigil Bigiluma"	A. R. Rahman	2:02

Additional Track
No.	Title	Singer(s)	Length
6.	"Kaalame"	Bamba Bakya	3:55
7.	"Idharkuthaan"	Dhee, Sunitha Sarathy, Arjun Chandy	2:42
Total length:			26:35

=== Telugu ===
All lyrics are written by Rakendu Mouli.

Whistle (Telugu)
No.	Title	Singer(s)	Length
1.	"Sivangivey"	A. R. Rahman, Sarath Santhosh, Shashaa Tirupati	6:04
2.	"Verrekkiddam"	L. V. Revanth	4:05
3.	"Neethone"	Anurag Kulkarni, Madhura Dhara Talluri	4:26
4.	"Maanini"	Chinmayi, Madhura Dhara Talluri, Sireesha, Akshara, Vithusayni	4:21
5.	"Whistle Whistle Whistluma"	A. R. Rahman	2:02
Total length:			26:35

== Reception ==
The music received positive reviews from critics, with "Singappenney", "Verithanam" and "Bigil Bigil Bigiluma" being well received by audiences. Behindwoods gave the album a rating of 3.25 out of 5, saying, "A. R. Rahman's perfect mix of class and mass music amplifies Bigil's verithanam [grandeur]!". International Business Times gave the album a rating of 3 out of 5, saying, "A. R. Rahman delivered a hit music album for Vijay in the form of Bigil". Moviecrow rated the album 3 out of 5, stating "A.R.Rahman's third successive collaboration with Vijay and fifth over the years is an amusing mix. Between an elastic spectrum of staying true to the likes of ARR and satisfying the monstrous hungry of the fans of a huge stardom, the album is more of a mixbag balancing both. Sometimes ARR overtakes and sometimes he gets ruthlessly overtaken."

== Chart performance ==
The song "Singappenney" reached #1 position on Radio Mirchi Top 20. On year-end chart, the song reached #1 position in Big FM "Best of 2019" chart; and also achieved #10 on The Times of India's "Top 15 Tamil Songs 2019", charts, as "Verithanam", other song from the film, achieved #5 as well. "Singappenney" was also listed in "5 best songs to cheer womenhood on International Women's Day" by News18.

The album was listed in Top 2019 Tamil albums of Sify and The New Indian Express. A review from A Humming Heart, ranked the album in 8th position in their Top 15 Tamil Albums. On a January–September 2019 survey report from the music platform JioSaavn, stated "Verithanam" and "Rowdy Baby" became the most streamed songs in this intermediate period. In September 2020, the song "Verithanam" crossed 100 million views on YouTube.

Weekly charts

Chart (2019–20)	Song title	Peak position	Reference(s)
Mirchi Top 20 Tamil	Singappenney	1	

Year-end charts

Chart (2019)	Song title	Position	Reference(s)
BIG FM Radio	Singappenney	1	
BIG FM Radio	Verithanam	1	
BIG FM Radio	Maathare	1	
BIG FM Radio	Bigil Bigil Bigiluma	1	
TheTimes of India	Verithanam	5	
TheTimes of India	Singappenney	10	
Movie Crow	Singappenney	3	
Movie Crow	Verithanam	7	
Movie Crow	Unakkaga	17	
Cinema Express	Verithanam	20	

=== Original soundtrack ===
Credits adapted from the official website of Sony Music South.

==== Producer(s) ====
A. R. Rahman

==== Songwriter(s) ====
- A. R. Rahman (Composer & Arranger)
- Vivek (Bigil-Tamil Version Lyrics), Rakendu Mouli (Whistle-Telugu Version Lyrics)

==== Performer(s) ====
A. R. Rahman, Vijay, Shashaa Tirupati, Sreekanth Hariharan, Madhura Dhara Talluri, Chinmayi, Sireesha, Akshara, Vithusayni, Bamba Bakya, Dhee, Arjun Chandy, Sunitha Sarathy, Sarath Santhosh, L. V. Revanth, Anurag Kulkarni

==== Musician(s) ====
- Guitar - Keba Jeremiah, Joseph Vijay
- Flute - Naveen Kumar, Kareem Kamalakhar, Rasika Shekhar
- Tabla - Sai Shravanam
- Shenai - Balesh
- Veena - Punya Srinivas
- Nadaswaram - D. Balasubramani
- Pakhawaj - Satya Narayanan
- Sarangi - Manonmani
- Clarinet & Saxophone - Sax Raja
- Live Rhythms - V. Kumar, T Raja, Vedha, Lakshmi Narayanan, Raju, Vikram, Hariprasadh, Ranjit, Krishna Kishore, P Guberan, Vetri, Pyare Lal
- Strings - Sunshine Orchestra (conducted by V. J. Srinivasamurthy), Chennai Strings Orchestra (conducted by R. Prabhakar), Macedonian Symphonic Orchestra (conducted by Oleg Kontradenko, Dzijan Emin)

==== Additional vocals ====
Sangeetha, Poovaiyar, Ka Ka Balachander, KR Arjun, Rakthaksh, Hriday Gattani, Hiral Viradia

==== Backing vocals ====
Arjun Chandy, Veena Murali, Deepthi Suresh, Rakshita Suresh, Abinaya, Ala B Bala, Sowmya, Soundarya, Nakul Abhyankar, Deepak, Niranjana Ramanan, Swagatha, Aravind Srinivas, Jithin Raj, Shenbagaraj, Santosh Hariharan, Vignesh Narayanan, Lavita Lobo, Madhura Dhara Talluri, Narayanan

==== Kids vocals ====
Riya K S, Nikhil P S, K R Arjun, Vidhya Rupini, K U Kokilapriya

Vocal Arrangement

Arjun Chandy, Nakul Abhyankar, Kumaran Sivamani

==== Personnel ====
Music Supervisors

T. R. Krishna Chetan

Additional Arrangements and Programming

T. R. Krishna Chetan, Jerry Silvester Vincent, Pawan CH, Santosh Dayanidhi, Kumaran Sivamani, Jim Sathya

==== Sound engineers ====
- Panchathan Record Inn, Chennai - T. R. Krishna Chetan, Suresh Permal, Karthik Sekaran, Suryansh, Barath, Riyasdeen Riyan, Nakul Abhyankar, Kumaran Sivamani
- AM Studios, Chennai - S. Sivakumar, Kannan Ganpat, Pradeep Menon, Krishnan Subramaniyan, Manoj Raman, Aravind MS

==== Production ====
- Musicians Fixer - R. Samidurai
- Musician Coordinators - T. M. Faizuddin, Abdul Hayum Siddique
- Mixed by - T. R. Krishna Chetan, P. A. Deepak, Pradvay Sivashankar, Jerry Silvester Vincent, Pradeep Baskaran
- Mastered by - Suresh Permal
- Mastered for iTunes - S. Sivakumar

=== Original score ===
Credits adapted from the official website of Sony Music South.

==== Producer ====
A. R. Rahman

==== Orchestra ====
- Orchestra conductor
  - Fames Macedonian Symphonic Orchestra - Oleg Kontradenko, Dzijan Emin
  - Sunshine Orchestra - V. J. Srinivasamurthy
  - Chennai Strings Orchestra - R. Prabhakar
- Sound Engineer - Alen Hadzi Stefanov
- Protocol Operator - Koca Davicodenic, Igor Vasilev
- Stage Manager - Ilija Grkovski, Teodora Arsovska
- Orchestrator - Joaquim Badia
- Additional Orchestration - Neelesh Mandalapu
- Orchestra Coordination - Andrew T. Mackay (for Bohemia Junction)

==== Instruments ====
- Guitar - Keba Jeremiah, Sunil Milner, Chris Jason
- Flute - Naveen Kumar, Kareem Kamalakhar
- Shenai - Balesh
- Veena - Punya Srinivas
- Nadaswaram - D. Balasubramani
- Violin - Suresh Lalwani, Vignesh
- Cello - Balaji, Sekar
- Sarangi - Manonmani
- Live Rhythms - V. Kumar, T Raja, Vedha, Lakshmi Narayanan, Raju, Vikram, Hariprasadh, Ranjit, Krishna Kishore, P Guberan, Vetri, Pyare Lal
- Strings - Sunshine Orchestra (conducted by V J Srinivasa Murthy), Chennai Strings Orchestra (conducted by R. Prabhakar), Macedonian Symphonic Orchestra (conducted by Oleg Kontradenko, Dzijan Emin)

==== Additional vocals ====
Arjun Chandy, Veena Murali, Deepthi Suresh, Hiral Viradia, Reema, Uthara Unnikrishnan, Rakshita Suresh, Abinaya, Ala B Bala, Sowmya, Soundarya, Nakul Abhyankar, Deepak, Niranjana Ramanan, Swagatha, Aravind Srinivas, Jithin Raj, Shenbagaraj, Santosh Hariharan, Vignesh Narayanan, Lavita Lobo, Madhura Dhara Talluri, Narayanan, Sana Moussa, Tanvi, Shiv

==== Personnel ====
Music Supervisor

T. R. Krishna Chetan

Additional Programming and Arrangement

Jim Sathya, Nakul Abhyankar, Pawan CH, A. R. Ameen, AH Kaashif, Jerry Vincent, Santhosh Dhayanidhi, Harsha Vardhan Upadrashta, Chitti, Ramesh

==== Sound engineers ====
- Panchathan Record Inn, Chennai - T. R. Krishna Chetan, Suresh Permal, Karthik Sekaran, Suryansh, Barath, Riyasdeen Riyan, Nakul Abhyankar, Kumaran Sivamani
- AM Studios, Chennai - S. Sivakumar, Kannan Ganpat, Pradeep Menon, Krishnan Subramaniyan, Manoj Raman, Aravind MS
- KM Music Conservatory, Chennai - Harsha Vardhan Upadrashta, Aravind Crescendo

==== Production ====
- Musicians Fixer - R. Samidurai
- Musician Coordinators - T. M. Faizuddin, Abdul Hayum Siddique
- Stereo Mixing - S. Sivakumar, Pradvay Sivashankar
