= Verithanam =

2019 song by A. R. Rahman

- Official single cover

Single by A. R. Rahman and Vijay

from the album Bigil (soundtrack)
- Language: Tamil
- Released: 1 September 2019
- Recorded: 2019
- Studio: Panchathan Record Inn and AM Studios, Chennai; KM Music Conservatory, Chennai
- Genre: Filmi, Indian folk, Indian pop, dance music
- Length: 4:05
- Label: Sony Music India
- Composer: A. R. Rahman
- Lyricist: Vivek
- Producer: A. R. Rahman

Bigil track listing
- 7 tracks: 1. "Singappenney"; 2. "Verithanam"; 3. "Unakkaga"; 4. "Maathare"; 5. "Bigil Bigil Bigiluma"; Bonus tracks: 1. "Kaalame"; 2. "Idharkuthan"

Music video
- "Verithanam" on YouTube

"Verithanam" (transl. Frenzy) is an Indian Tamil-language song composed by A. R. Rahman, the song featured lyrics written by Vivek and sung by actor Vijay, for the soundtrack album of the 2019 film Bigil. The film, directed by Atlee, starring Vijay. It is the first song Vijay has recorded for Rahman. The song was released by Sony Music India on 1 September 2019, and its video version was unveiled on 1 November.

== Background ==
In early 2019, media reports surfaced that Vijay may record one song for A. R. Rahman for Thalapathy 63 (Bigil), which will be his first collaboration as a singer with Rahman, although the composer worked with the actor's films in Udhaya (2004), Azhagiya Tamil Magan (2007), Mersal (2017) and Sarkar (2018). Although, after his return to playback singing with "Google Google" from Thuppakki, and continuously sang for his upcoming projects until Bairavaa, he did not record a song for Mersal, and eventually he was reported to sing for Sarkar, which was also composed by A. R. Rahman, which also failed to happen.

On 8 July 2019, Archana Kalpathi, the creative producer of AGS Entertainment, which produced the film had shared a picture with Vijay, Rahman, Vivek and Atlee being present at Rahman's recording studio Panchathan Record Inn, Chennai for the song which was titled "Verithanam". With this, the producers confirmed Vijay singing for Rahman's composition for the very first time, although he sang for many leading composers. Super Singer fame Poovaiyar was reported to act and provide additional vocals for one of the songs.

== Release ==
The song was initially reported to be released as the first single from the film. However, as another track "Singappenney" leaked onto the internet in mid-July 2019, the makers released that song as the first single, and planned to release "Verithanam" later. In mid-August 2019, reports being surfaced that this song has been leaked into the internet, and became a trending topic in Twitter, urging fans to release the original track sooner as possible. However, few media handles claimed that the leak was not true.

The official promo video for the song was released on 31 August 2019, and a day later, the full song was released by Sony Music India through their streaming platforms and a lyrical video through YouTube. At the film's audio launch held at Sri Sai Ram Engineering College, Chennai on 27 September 2019, Vijay who participated at the event, sang a couple lines from the song while addressing his speech.

The video version of this song was exclusively premiered at the television channel Sun Music on 30 October 2019. Later the song was released through YouTube on 1 November 2019.

== Reception ==
=== Critical response ===
Antara Chakraborty of The Indian Express wrote in its review, saying "The song is a fast-paced dance number, the kind of song that has become a staple in Vijay’s films. It is definitely fun, with a rustic feel." India Today called the song as "proper mass number" while The News Minute called that the song "has been delivered in Vijay's signature style". A critic from Behindwoods wrote "A completely dynamic song with the expressive voice of Vijay is the main highlight, as the lyrics, slang, and voice of the singer will overshadow the tune, but the orchestra doesn't let go easily." International Business Times-based critic Prakash Upadhyaya called the song as a "fast-paced number with a local flavour" further saying "With Vijay himself lending voice for the number, it strikes the chord with the fans, instantly. The fans could not have expected a better mass number than this as Thalapathy's voice blends well with the tune and the lyrics." Moviecrow called the number as "the most commercially accessible track of the album".

=== Records ===
The song crossed 1 million likes within the first five days of its release. A year after its release, the video song crossed 100 million views in September 2020, eventually becoming one of the most viewed songs of Vijay on the video-sharing platform YouTube. A January–September 2019 survey report from the music platform JioSaavn, stated "Verithanam" along with "Rowdy Baby" (a song from Dhanush's Maari 2), as one of the most streamed songs in this intermediate period.

=== Chart performance ===
Weekly charts

Chart (2019–20)	Peak position	Reference(s)
Mirchi Top 20 (Tamil)	1	
Wynk Music Top 20 (Tamil)	2	
YouTube Trending	2	
Spotify Top Hits (Tamil)	3	
JioSaavn Weekly Top 15 (Tamil)	3	

Year-end charts

Chart (2019)	Position	Reference(s)
BIG FM Radio (Tamil)	1	
The Times of India	5	
Moviecrow	7	
Cinema Express	20	

=== Criticism ===
In September 2019, a video came up with connection to the number to strengthen the claims that the song has achieved records as a result of a paid campaign. Some of the fans started trending the hashtag #PaidVerithanamLikesExposed and trashed the film's producers allegedly opting for a paid campaign to create a new record.

== Personnel ==
Credits adapted from A. R. Rahman's official website and Sony Music South

- A. R. Rahman – Composer, arranger, producer
- Vijay – Playback singer
- Vivek – Lyricist
- Sangeeta – Additional vocals
- Poovaiyar – Additional vocals
- Ka Ka Balachander – Additional vocals
- KR Arjun – Additional vocals
- Rakthaksh – Additional vocals
- Veena Murali – Backing vocals
- Deepthi Suresh – Backing vocals
- Abinaya – Backing vocals
- Ala B Bala – Backing vocals
- Sowmya – Backing vocals
- Soundarya – Backing vocals
- Lavita Lobo – Backing vocals
- Riya K S – Kids vocals
- Nikhil P S – Kids vocals
- K R Arjun – Kids vocals
- Vidhya Rupini – Kids vocals
- K U Kokilapriya – Kids vocals
- Keba Jeremiah – Guitar
- Balesh – Shehnai
- T. R. Krishna Chetan – Sound Engineer (Panchathan Record Inn, Chennai), additional arrangements and programming, audio mixing
- Kumaran Sivamani – Additional arrangements and programming
- Santosh Dhayanidhi – Additional arrangements and programming
- Suresh Permal – Sound engineer (Panchathan Record Inn, Chennai), mastering (Studio mastering)
- Karthik Sekaran – Sound engineer (Panchathan Record Inn, Chennai)
- Suryansh – Sound engineer (Panchathan Record Inn, Chennai)
- Barath Dhanashekhar – Sound engineer (Panchathan Record Inn, Chennai)
- Riyasdeen Riyan – Sound engineer (Panchathan Record Inn, Chennai)
- S. Sivakumar – Sound engineer (AM Studios, Chennai), mastering (Apple Digital Master)
- Kannan Ganpat – Sound engineer (AM Studios, Chennai)
- Pradeep Menon – Sound engineer (AM Studios, Chennai)
- Krishnan Subramaniyan – Sound engineer (AM Studios, Chennai)
- Manoj Raman – Sound engineer (AM Studios, Chennai)
- Aravind MS – Sound engineer (AM Studios, Chennai)
- P. A. Deepak – Audio mixing
- R. Samidurai – Musician's fixer
- T. M. Faizuddin – Music co-ordinators
- Abdul Haiyum Siddique – Music co-ordinators
