= Poovaiyar =

Indian singer

- Born: c. 2008
- Other names: Guppies Poovaiyar
- Occupations: Singer; actor
- Years active: 2019–present
- Notable work: A contestant in Super Singer

Poovaiyar is an Indian gaana singer and actor who works in Tamil-language films. He is known for being a part of Season 6 of Star Vijay's Super Singer Junior and co-singing "Verithanam" from Bigil (2019).

== Career ==
Poovaiyar participated and became the second runner up of Super Singer Junior 6. He sang a song in Natpe Thunai (2019) along with Hiphop Tamizha Adhi. Poovaiyar co-sang the song "Verithanam" in the film Bigil (2019) with Vijay and Sangeetha Rajeshwaran in addition to appearing in the song. Poovaiyar sang the song "Kolamav Kokkila" in the film 50/50 (2019). The film picturizes Yogi Babu and is inspired by the song "Kalyaana Vayasu" from Kolamavu Kokila. He later appeared in the films Master (2021), Andhagan and Cobra.

== Discography ==
Year	Film	Song	Composer	Co-singers	Lyricist
2019	Gorilla	"Chimp Song"	Sam C. S.	Anthony Daasan	Sam C. S.
2019	Bigil	"Verithanam"	A. R. Rahman	Vijay, Sangeetha Sajith	Vivek
2019	50/50	"Kolamav Kokkila"	Dharan Kumar	MC D	MC D
2020	Lift	"Inna Mayilu"	Britto Michael	Sivakarthikeyan, Kamala Kannan, Rajesh	Nishanth
2021	Corona Kumar	"CSK Sigangala"	Javed Riaz	Silambarasan	Lalithanand
2022	—N/a	"Moopilla Thamizhe Thaaye"	A. R. Rahman	A. R. Rahman, Saindhavi, Khatija Rahman, A. R. Ameen, Amina Rafiq, Gabriella Sellus, Rakshita Suresh, Niranjana Ramanan, Aparna Harikumar, Nakul Abhyankar	Thamarai
2022	Therkathi Veeran	"Kadal Amma"	Srikanth Deva	Deva	Saarath

== Filmography ==
- All films are in Tamil, unless otherwise noted.

Year	Title	Role	Notes
2019	Bigil	Himself	Cameo appearance in the song "Verithanam"
2021	Master	Undiyal	
2022	Koogle Kuttappa	Babu's friend	
2022	Cobra	N. Sathish	
2022	Therkathi Veeran	Himself	Cameo appearance in the song "Therkathi Veera"
2023	Shot Boot Three	Ramana	
2024	Maharaja	Salon staff member	
2024	Andhagan	Kappes	
2025	Phoenix		
2025	Bomb	Yogesh	
2025	Ram Abdullah Antony	TBA	

=== Television ===
Year	Title	Role	Channel	Notes
2019	Super Singer Junior 6	Contestant	STAR Vijay	Second runner-up
2025	Cooku with Comali season 6	Comali	Star Vijay	
