= Ram Abdullah Antony =

2025 Tamil film

- Theatrical release poster
- Directed by: Jayavel
- Written by: Jayavel
- Produced by: T. S. Clement Suresh
- Starring: Poovaiyar; Ajay Arnold; Arjun; Soundararaja
- Cinematography: L. K. Vijay
- Edited by: Vinoth Sivakumar
- Music by: T. R. Krishna Chetan
- Production company: Annai Vailankanni Studio
- Release date: 31 October 2025
- Country: India
- Language: Tamil

Ram Abdullah Antony is Indian Tamil-language thriller film written and directed by Jayavel in his debut directorial, starring Super Singer Junior fame Poovaiyar in his debut as the lead actor, alongside Ajay Arnold, Arjun, Soundararaja, Sai Dheena, Vela Ramamoorthy, Thalaivasal Vijay and others important roles. The film is produced by T. S. Clement Suresh making his maiden production under his Annai Vailankanni Studio. The film was in post-production phase during its announcement in late-May 2025. The film has music composed by T. R. Krishna Chetan, cinematography done by L. K. Vijay and editing done by Vinoth Sivakumar.

Ram Abdullah October released in theatres on 31 October 2025 to negative reviews

== Cast ==
- Poovaiyar
- Ajay Arnold
- Arjun
- Soundararaja
- Pooja Pradyut
- Sai Dheena
- Vela Ramamoorthy
- Java Sundaresan
- Thalaivasal Vijay
- Vinodhini Vaidyanathan
- Biggboss Arnav
- Vanitha Vijayakumar

== Release ==
Ram Abdullah Antony released in theatres on 31 October 2025.

== Reception ==
Dinamalar gave 2.75 stars and Maalai Malar gave 2.5/5 stars.
