= Therkathi Veeran =

2022 action drama film

- Promotional poster
- Directed by: Saarath
- Produced by: Saarath
- Starring: Saarath; Anagha
- Cinematography: N. Shanmuga Sundaram
- Edited by: V. J. Sabu Joseph
- Music by: Srikanth Deva
- Production company: Chandrababu Film Factory
- Release date: 2 December 2022
- Country: India
- Language: Tamil

Therkathi Veeran (English: Southern Warrior) is a 2022 Indian Tamil-language action drama film directed by Saarath and starring himself in the lead role, alongside Anagha with Ashok Kumar in a supporting role. It was released on 2 December 2022.

== Plot ==
Five eminent personalities trap a commoner, who fights for the welfare and upliftment of his society, in the murder case of his beloved friend.

== Cast ==
- Saarath
- Anagha as Shiny
- Ashok Kumar as Vasanth
- Kabir Duhan Singh as Dhruvudas
- Pawan as Councillor Thangam
- Vela Ramamoorthy
- Madhusudhan Rao as Rayappan
- Namo Narayana
- Aryan
- Rajasimman as Rajadurai
- R. N. R. Manohar as R. N. R. Manohar
- Bharani
- Kalloori Vinoth
- KPY Mullai
- Lollu Sabha Manohar
- Vengal Rao
- Renuka
- Uma Padmanabhan
- Cheranraj as Inspector
- Pandian as Shiny's father
- Rethika Srinivas as police commissioner
- Poovaiyar in a guest appearance
- Prasanna Sujit in a guest appearance
- Srikanth Deva in a guest appearance
- Sandy in a guest appearance

== Production ==
The film marked the acting and directing debut of Saarath, the grandson of former Tamil actor J. P. Chandrababu. Saarath revealed that he wrote the story based on a compilation of incidents that had taken place in Thoothukudi. Srikanth Deva was approached to portray the antagonist in the film, but turned down the offer and worked as the music composer.

== Soundtrack ==
Soundtrack was composed by Srikanth Deva.

- Kadalamma - Deva, Poovaiyar
- Enna Thavam - Sathyaprakash, Priyanka
- Unna Paarkatha - Srinisha Jayaseelan
- Therkathi Veera - Pooja Vaidyanath
- Varamaaga - Saarath

== Reception ==
The film was released on 2 December 2022 across Tamil Nadu. A critic from Maalai Malar gave the film 2 out of 5 stars, and labelled the film as a "failure". A reviewer from Dina Thanthi also gave the film an unfavourable review.
