= Vineeth Varaprasad =

Indian film director and screenwriter

- Occupation: Film director
- Years active: 2021-present

Vineeth Varaprasad is an Indian film director and screenwriter who works in Tamil films.

== Career ==
Vineeth Varaprasad made his directorial debut with the horror thriller film Lift. It was directly released on Disney+ Hotstar on 1 October 2021. The first single from Lift, titled "Inna Mylu," became a viral hit.

After the success of Lift, Vineeth Varaprasad is set to team up with actor Harish Kalyan for his next project, an action thriller. The film will feature Tollywood actor Sunil in a key role, and Britto Michael has been roped in as the composer. The shoot is scheduled to begin in November 2024.

== Filmography ==
- Lift (2021)
