= Padmavyooham (2012 film) =

- Theatrical release poster
- Directed by: Bijoy P. I.
- Written by: Bijoy P. I.
- Produced by: Mega Wave Productions
- Starring: Noby Tharian
- Cinematography: Sunil Kaimanam
- Edited by: Safdar Merva
- Music by: Sanjeev Krishnan
- Release date: 26 October 2012
- Running time: 90 mins
- Country: India
- Language: Malayalam

Padmavyooham is a 2012 Indian Malayalam mystery-thriller film written and directed by Bijoy P. I. and produced by a team of IT professionals in Technopark under the banner "Mega Wave Productions". The film was released on 26 October 2012.

== Plot ==
"Padmavyooham" is a Malayalam term (derived from Sanskrit) that represents a special type of army constellation. It is a top secret army deployment method which contains one entry point and one exit point which is difficult to locate. The film is about the mythological story of Sree Padmanabhaswamy temple, the design of the idol, and the temple's riches. The story is presented in the backdrop of Travancore royal palace and brings out the ideas behind the construction of the temple and the significance of the placement of the idol of Vishnu.

Padmavyooham opens with a police probe into a few temple robberies and the death of a journalist who investigates the complex defence mechanism of the Sree Padmanabhaswamy temple. Following this, Adhitya Varma, the patron of the temple sets out on an expedition to find out the details of temple construction. The story develops based on the myth that the temple idol can work as a water valve to let the sea water in and out of the temple in case of an emergency. As in a "Padmavyooham", Varma's expedition runs into a series of events that unfold the relation between the famed Travancore ruler's vision, security features implemented in the temple, and the significance of the temple treasure.

== Cast ==
- Noby Tharian as Adhitya Varma
- Sajeev Nair as Anwar Ibrahim
- Anchal Babu as Viswettan
- Amal Abraham as Rishi Ramavarma
- Kiran Narayanan as Liaqat Ali
- Fayis Salman as Harihar Iyengar
- Anish Panickar as Sreedharan Potti
- Riyas as Devan
- Vipin as Sherif
- Bhaskaran Nair as Thirumeni of Vishnu temple
- Amritha Aiyer (uncredited)

== Production ==
"The film intends to pan camera on how king Marthanda Varma could have envisaged a complex defence mechanism in the temple in order to protect it by creating a "Padmavyooham" like structure in the epic. It is possible to see the temple either from the angle of devotion or as a place that houses immense wealth. Our point is that even the vaults would have some complex structure behind its construction."

— Bijoy about Padmavyooham.

Padmavyooham is Bijoy's directorial debut. The scripting of the film was completed six years before it was shot. The story was developed based on inputs from available literature about temple history and also from knowledgeable people. It also contains fictitious elements. In 2008, Bijoy had made a short film The Myth based on the same theme, but with a negative climax. After receiving good feedback from the film fraternity, he planned Padmavyooham and redesigned the story to suit a feature film. The film was shot around Attingal palace, Thiruvananthapuram, and Alappuzha using a Red One camera. Due to security constraints at the Sree Padmanabhaswamy temple, the crew kept away from shooting inside the temple. For the climax scenes of the film, an 18 feet long and 10 feet high idol of Sree Padmanabhaswamy was constructed by art director Ajayan Kattungal. This is amongst the biggest one piece models used in Malayalam films. The film shows a one-minute animation sequence created by DC Animations, which shows how the idol acts as a water valve.

== Release and reception ==
Padmavyooham was given a U-certificate by the Central Board of Film Certification. The preview of the film was run at Dhanya theatre in Thiruvananthapuram. On 26 October 2012, the film was released in five major cities in Kerala, including Thiruvananthapuram (Sree Visakh), Ernakulam (Chithranjali), Kozhikode (Sree), Thrissur (Sree), and Alappuzha (Chithranjali).

== Controversy ==
In July 2012, the certification and the release of the movie were stayed by the Kerala High Court, following a petition filed by the executive officer of the Sree Padmanabhaswamy temple. It was pointed out in the petition that the plot of the movie posed security concerns to the temple. It was also mentioned that the making of the film was against the Supreme Court order that the media should not issue baseless reports about the temple wealth. Later, a special screening was arranged for the court, temple authorities, and the titular king of Travancore to convince them that the story did not contain anything controversial. Subsequently, in October 2012, the stay was lifted by the High Court and the film was made ready for release.

== Soundtrack ==
Soundtrack of the film was composed by Sanjeev Krishnan for the lyrics by Suku Maruthathoor and Aji Daivappura. Music is released by East Coast Audios.

Track list
No.	Title	Artist(s)	Length
1.	"Brahmaprabhavame"	Shankar Mahadevan	03:02
2.	"Kaanakkili paadi"	Vidhu Prathap	02:57
3.	"Ennunnikkanna"	Vidhu Prathap
4.	"Kaanakkili paadi"	Vidhu Prathap, Neha Nair	02:57
5.	"Minnaminni vayo"	Prem Prameswar, Aparna
6.	"Ennunnikkanna"	Saritha Rajeev
7.	"Theme song"	Ratheesh Krishna
