= Andhagan =

2024 Tamil film by Thiagarajan

- Theatrical release poster
- Directed by: Thiagarajan
- Screenplay by: Thiagarajan; Pattukkottai Prabakar (dialogue)
- Based on: Andhadhun by Sriram Raghavan
- Produced by: Shanthi Thiagarajan; Preethi Thiagarajan
- Starring: Prashanth; Simran; Priya Anand
- Cinematography: Ravi Yadav
- Edited by: Sathish Suriya
- Music by: Santhosh Narayanan
- Production company: Staar Movies
- Distributed by: V Creations
- Release date: 9 August 2024
- Running time: 135 minutes
- Country: India
- Language: Tamil

Andhagan: The Pianist (transl. Blind Man) is a 2024 Indian Tamil-language black comedy crime thriller film directed by Thiagarajan and produced by Staar Movies. The film stars Prashanth, Simran and Priya Anand, with K. S. Ravikumar, P. Samuthirakani, Yogi Babu, Urvashi, Manobala and Vanitha Vijayakumar in supporting roles, while Karthik makes a special appearance. It is a remake of the 2018 Hindi-language film Andhadhun, and follows a fake blind pianist who unwittingly becomes embroiled in a murder.

In 2019, Thiagarajan purchased the remake rights of Andhadhun, which was followed by Mohan Raja being announced as director the following year. However, Raja left the project and was replaced with JJ Fredrick, who also left some months later, before Thiagarajan himself took over. Principal photography commenced in March 2021, and predominantly took place in Chennai before wrapping by November 2022. The film has music composed by Santhosh Narayanan, cinematography handled by Ravi Yadav and editing by Sathish Suriya.

Andhagan was released on 9 August 2024 in theatres, following production delays due to the COVID-19 pandemic. The film received generally positive reviews and became a commercial success. Some critics regarded it a comeback for Prashanth after a series of failures.

== Plot ==
Puducherry-based Krishna "Krish" is an up-and-coming pianist who fakes being blind as an experiment to improve his piano skills. While crossing the street, he is knocked over by Julie. She takes care of Krish and Julie being impressed by Krish's talent, they begin a romantic relationship. Krish wears opaque lenses to practice playing piano, but after meeting Julie, he is tempted to look at her. He stops wearing his opaque lenses, and simply pretends to be blind. At a diner, a retired actor, Karthick, notices Krish and invites him to give a private performance for his wedding anniversary.

Krish arrives at Karthick's flat and Karthick's wife Simi opens the door. Simi, to avoid a nosey neighbour, D'Susa, who happens to be watching and seeing that Krish is blind, lets Krish inside to play the piano. Krish sees Karthick's corpse nearby but has to feign ignorance and continue to play to keep up his act of being blind. He also sees Manohar, Simi's paramour, hiding in the bathroom. Simi and Manohar clean the crime scene and stuff the corpse into a suitcase while Krish plays.

Krish tries to report the murder to sub-inspector Bala, but is dissuaded when he discovers that Manohar works at the same police station. At Karthick's funeral, D'Susa tells Bala about seeing an unknown man (Manohar) going to Karthick's flat the day of his murder. Simi pushes D'Susa off the ledge of their apartment. Krish happens to see the murder when he arrives to give piano lessons to Karthick's daughter, Sanjana, but is forced to continue feigning blindness. Simi goes to Krish's house and hands him prasada as Krish makes coffee for them. After poisoning his coffee, she observes him carefully and busts his act after he spills the coffee on purpose. Krish says he will leave for London and keep Simi's secret, but falls unconscious.

Kappes, the neighbour's son, has recorded a video of Krish fully able to see and shows it to Julie. As she arrives, Simi arranges things to look like she and Krish had slept together. Anguished, Julie leaves Krish. On regaining consciousness, he realises that he has been blinded from the prasada. Manohar comes to Krish's house to kill him. Krish barely escapes, but faints after hitting a telephone pole.

Krish wakes up in an illegal organ harvesting clinic. Dr. Sami and his assistants Murali and Sarasu decide to spare Krish when he reveals he has information that will make them millions. They kidnap Simi, stage a suicide scene, and blackmail Manohar. However, Murali and Sarasu double-cross Krish, tie him up with Simi, and plan to take the money themselves. Murali takes the money from Manohar, but is wounded when escaping from him. Manohar becomes trapped in an elevator, and once he escapes, Sarasu knocks him out. While Murali is hospitalised, Sarasu finds the money to be counterfeit.

Simi helps Krish free himself and he removes Simi's blindfold. While he is trying to find an escape for both of them, Simi frees herself and attacks him. Sami enters; after a brief fight, he and Krish knock Simi out, tie her up in the boot of a car, and drive away. Sami reveals that Simi has a rare blood type and that her organs would sell for millions; he also plans to use her corneas to restore Krish's sight.

Two years later, in London, Julie finds Krish. He tells her the whole story, explaining that after he and Sami drove away, Simi awoke and began making noise. Sami stopped the car to sedate her again, but she overpowered him and seized the wheel. Krish, thinking Sami was still driving, tried to persuade him to release Simi. She revealed herself, dropped Krish off and tried to run him over. A nearby hunter, trying to shoot a hare, missed his shot, causing the hare to jump and hit the windshield; Simi lost control of the car and died when the car crashed.

After listening to Krish's story, Julie tells him that he should have accepted Sami's offer, and Krish quietly walks away. After a while, he uses his cane to knock a can out of his path.

== Cast ==
- Prashanth as Krishna "Krish"
- Simran as Simi
- Priya Anand as Julie
- K. S. Ravikumar as Dr. Sami
- P. Samuthirakani as Manohar
- Yogi Babu as Murali
- Urvashi as Sarasu
- Manobala as Bala
- Vanitha Vijayakumar as Revolver Lalitha
- Leela Samson as D'Susa
- Besant Ravi as the hunter
- Mohan Vaidya as the music store owner
- Aadesh Bala as a smoker
- Poovaiyar as Kappes
- Dinamalar Kavitha as herself
- Semmalar Annam as Rasi
- Lakshmi Pradeep as Sanjana

Special appearance

- Karthik as Karthick
- Thiagarajan as an artist (uncredited appearance in the song "Yosichi Yosichi")

== Production ==
=== Development ===
In August 2019, it was announced that Thiagarajan had purchased the rights to remake the Hindi film Andhadhun (2018) in Tamil, outbidding other producers like Dhanush and Siddharth. Thiagarajan said he had been in discussions with the production house of Andhadhun since that film's release, and due to the rapport that they developed, he was able to acquire the remake rights. The remake would be produced by Preethi and Shanthi Thiagarajan under the Staar Movies banner. The team held discussions with Gautham Vasudev Menon in late August 2019 about directing the film, but he ultimately did not sign on the project.

In January 2020, it was announced that Mohan Raja would direct the yet-untitled remake. However, that October, he withdrew from the project and was replaced by JJ Fredrick. Raja's withdrawal was reported to be due to scheduling conflicts with a Telugu film he had previously signed on to direct. The title Andhagan was unveiled on 1 January 2021. In March 2021, Fredrick announced his departure from the film without specifying a reason, and Thiagarajan took over directing. He also wrote the screenplay and Pattukkottai Prabakar wrote the dialogues. Thiagarajan claimed he took over direction to avoid production delays. Cinematographer Ravi Yadav agreed to Thiagarajan's request to set aside three months to work on the film. Editing was handled by Sathish Suriya.

=== Casting ===
In August 2019, Thiagarajan announced that his son Prashanth would play the protagonist, a pianist. He noted that since Prashanth was a trained pianist, this benefited the casting. In April 2020, Thiagarajan said there had been discussions with Tabu to reprise her role as the retired actor's wife from Andhadhun, but the actress eventually did not sign on. Ramya Krishnan was also considered for the role, but did not join the project. That August, Thiagarajan said Yogi Babu would play the "crucial role" of an auto driver, and Karthik had also agreed to join the film. In response to reports that Karthik was cast as the retired actor originally played by Anil Dhawan, Thiagarajan said his role had not yet been decided; he expressed his interest in seeing Karthik in the role of the doctor originally played by Zakir Hussain, but Karthik was ultimately confirmed to be cast in Dhawan's role. The producers held discussions with Aishwarya Rai Bachchan to play the role earlier offered to Tabu during October 2020, but she did not sign the film. In December 2020, Simran was confirmed for that role.

In January 2021, K. S. Ravikumar was cast in an undisclosed role, later revealed to be the doctor. Thiagarajan said casting for the role originally played by Radhika Apte was underway, and the makers were searching for an "established actor" to play the role, though by the time filming began, the role was still not cast. On 18 March, it was announced that Priya Anand was cast in the role. She sought not to emulate Apte, but give the character her own unique interpretation. In the same month Vanitha Vijayakumar joined, playing the role originally played by Ashwini Kalsekar. Vanitha had not watched Andhadhun until after she was approached for the role, and chose to act on instinct without being influenced by Kalsekar's performance. Manav Vij was initially chosen to reprise his role from Andhadhun as the police inspector, but ultimately did not remain on the project because of delays in the beginning of production. P. Samuthirakani was later approached to play the character; despite his busy schedule, he accepted the role. The film is the acting debut of Lakshmi Pradeep, a finalist of the fifth season of Star Vijay's Super Singer. It is one of the last completed films of Manobala, who died long before the film's release.

=== Filming ===
Principal photography was supposed to begin in April 2020, but was delayed due to the COVID-19 pandemic. It was later rescheduled to begin in January 2021, but ultimately began on 10 March at Prashanth Gold Tower, Chennai, hours before Fredrick announced his exit. Thiagarajan planned to finish shooting within 35 days without any breaks in schedule. Shooting also took place in a house in T. Nagar which the crew bought and remodelled so it would resemble the house from Andhadhun.

The climax was initially planned to be filmed in London, but those plans were dropped by April due to the COVID-19 lockdown there. Filming was 50% complete by that time, with only small schedules in Chennai and Puducherry remaining, along with a three-day schedule in another European country. By 27 April, filming had been suspended indefinitely due to the second wave of the pandemic in India, with Thiagarajan saying it would resume once the entire crew was vaccinated against COVID-19. Filming ultimately resumed on 6 July at a hotel in Chennai, and the schedule there was completed on 28 July, with only the climax left to be filmed in an overseas country. Principal photography wrapped by mid-2022, with the exception of a song sequence choreographed by Prabhu Deva, which was filmed in mid-November that year.

== Music ==
The music has been composed by Santhosh Narayanan, with lyrics written by Vairamuthu, Vivek, Uma Devi and Ekadesi. The soundtrack was preceded by three singles—"En Kadhal", "Yosichi Yosichi" and "Kannile"—before the album's release on 9 July 2023 under the Sony Music India label. A promotional song, "The Andhagan Anthem", was later released on 24 July 2024.

== Release ==
Andhagan was released worldwide on 9 August 2024. It was previously scheduled for 15 August, but was advanced by a week. In early March 2022, Kalaipuli S. Thanu acquired the rights to distribute the film worldwide via his V Creations. Despite that, the film faced repeated delays in its release, and for over a year the makers seldom posted updates on the film, only releasing new posters on public holidays or festivals. The August 2024 release window was announced in June 2024.

=== Home media ===
The film had its television premiere on Astro Vinmeen on 30 October 2024, and began streaming on Amazon Prime Video from 26 November. A month later, it began streaming on Aha Tamil and Sun NXT.

== Reception ==
=== Box office ===
Before release, Andhagan was predicted by some media not to perform well due to the other Andhadhun remakes not being well received. The film earned ₹65 lakh (equivalent to ₹69 lakh or US$72,000 in 2026) on the opening day, and twice as much the day after. It grossed ₹2.99 crore (equivalent to ₹3.2 crore or US$330,000 in 2026) in three days. The trade said that although the film was performing well, it was likely to be affected by the release of numerous Tamil films on 15 August. Irrespective of the film's performance, an event was held around that time to celebrate the film's apparent success. According to an estimate by Hindustan Times, the film made over ₹15 crore (equivalent to ₹16 crore or US$1.7 million in 2026) against a budget of ₹10 crore (equivalent to ₹11 crore or US$1.1 million in 2026).

=== Critical response ===
Anusha Sundar of OTTPlay gave the film a favourable review, noting that Andhagan, unlike other Indian films remakes, "intelligently retains the clean and smart screenplay, to elevate the Tamil version with its brilliant casting and production". Abhinav Subramanian of The Times of India rated the film 3.5 out of 5 stars, saying it "delivers a mix of suspense and humor that keeps audiences engaged throughout", noting its faithfulness to the original. Janani K of India Today also appreciated the film's faithfulness to Andhadhun and described the remake's casting as its "biggest strength". Latha Srinivasan of Hindustan Times, despite noting the film's faithfulness, said the remake "definitely falls short in numerous aspects including the casting and music".

Avinash Ramachandran of The Indian Express rated the film 3 stars out of 5 and wrote, "Somehow, Thiagarajan’s loyalty to Sriram Raghavan’s writing holds Andhagan in good stead, and it only gets better with the effective casting". Gopinath Rajendran of The Hindu wrote that the film "lacks the zaniness of Andhadhun and some of the scenes fall flat but it’s the primary cast’s sheer performance that keeps the film in check", particularly Prashanth and Simran. Narayani M of Cinema Express rated the film 3 out of 5 stars, saying, "Despite the lack of surprises, Andhagan holds on to its strongest feature—a solid screenplay" and lauded the cast performances, including those with limited screentime, but felt Priya Anand's character was "extremely unidimensional". Online critic Blue Sattai Maran, known for his contrarian and negative reviews, gave the film a positive review, which received media attention.

== Accolades ==
Simran received the JFW Film Award for Best Actress in a Negative Role for her role in this film. At the 70th Filmfare Awards South, she was nominated for the Filmfare Award for Best Actress Tamil, and Priya Anand for Best Supporting Actress Tamil.
