= Lift (2021 film) =

2021 Indian Tamil-language horror drama thriller film by Vineeth Varaprasad

- Official release poster
- Directed by: Vineeth Varaprasad
- Written by: Vineeth Varaprasad
- Produced by: Hepzi
- Starring: Kavin; Amritha Aiyer
- Cinematography: S. Yuva
- Edited by: G. Madan
- Music by: Britto Michael
- Production company: Ekaa Entertainment
- Distributed by: Disney+ Hotstar
- Release date: 1 October 2021
- Running time: 134 minutes
- Country: India
- Language: Tamil

Lift is a 2021 Indian Tamil-language horror thriller film written and directed by Vineeth Varaprasad in his directorial debut. The film stars Kavin and Amritha Aiyer. It was directly released via Disney+ Hotstar on 1 October 2021. The film received mainly positive reviews from critics, who noted that the highlight was a passingly good main cast's performance.

== Plot ==
Guru Prasad joins as a team leader at Amrak, an IT company in Chennai. Guru is standoffish to his team members, but arouses the interest of Harini, an HR manager who is also new. At the end of a work day, everybody leaves except for Guru, who is given an important task by the VP, and several security guards. After completing his work, Guru attempts to use the lift. However, it malfunctions, and he ends up on a random floor. He encounters several paranormal events and later witnesses a security guard commit suicide by slitting his own throat.

A petrified Guru attempts to escape, but is repeatedly foiled. He later encounters Harini, who has been locked in the records room. She initially suspects Guru of locking her in, but changes her mind after encountering the abnormal events in the lift. Harini and Guru team up together to try to escape, but repeatedly fail. They encounter yet another security guard, who later hangs himself while attempting to verify their identity. The pair later sees a news report (dated to the following day) which claims that they both died in a fire in the office building. Harini reveals that she was locked in the record's room after attempting to destroy several old files at the behest of the VP. After several encounters with paranormal events, they come to the conclusion that there are two ghosts in the building, not one.

Guru forms a plan to survive, but Harini becomes possessed. The ghost taunts Guru and tells him that both he and Harini will die that night in the fire. Guru realises that the ghosts can only possess them while they are sound of mind, and smokes a cigarette with a drug, ensuring that Harini also inhales the smoke. With this, the ghost is no longer able to possess Harini. In the process, Guru also sets fire to the records room. Guru saves Harini, and the pair go back to the lift. Guru had, earlier, cut partially through the cables of the lift, and the pair jumped up and down in the lift to make the lift fall. Harini survives the fall, but Guru is severely injured and almost dies. The pair were rescued by emergency responders.

While Guru is still unconscious, he dreams of the story of the two ghosts. Sundar and his fiancée Tara, worked for the same company as Guru and Harini and were, in fact, the predecessors of the positions Guru and Harini are currently holding. When the greedy VP fires Sundar in order to take credit for his work, Sundar dies by suicide in the lift by slitting his own throat. The VP attempts to cover up his death as an accident, but Tara hides the file in the records room and hangs herself to ensure that the VP doesn't find out where it is. The two security guards (who were later forced into committing suicide by the ghosts) helped the VP cover up the death.

Guru wakes up and is visited by the new VP of the company, who attempts to threaten him and Harini into keeping quiet. Guru refuses to comply and gives the file that Tara had hidden to the police officer in charge of the investigation. The police officer reveals to Guru that three bodies had been found in the burnt-out office building: the two security guards and the VP, who had driven Sundar and Tara to their deaths.

The movie ends with news articles detailing the exploitation of employees in the IT industry and how many of them have been driven to suicide due to the treatment of their employers.

== Cast ==
- Kavin as Guruprasad "Guru", TL of Delta Project and Harini's crush.
- Amritha Aiyer as Harini, HR Manager of AMRAK and Guru's love interest
- Gayathri Reddy as Tara, former HR Manager of AMRAK and Sundar's fiancee (in past)
- Kiran Konda as Sundar, former TL of Delta Project and Tara's fiancee (in past)
- Balaji Venugopal as Vice President of AMRAK
- Muruganantham
- Earnest Anand
- Abdool Lee
- Pradeep Raj
- Pradeep K. Vijayan
- Rahul Thatha
- Prathosh
- R. S. Srinivasan
- Suresh Raju

== Production ==
The film project was announced by debutant director Vineeth Varaprasad. Kavin was cast as the lead actor and he began shooting for the film offer soon after his walk out from the third season of Bigg Boss Tamil. The principal photography of the film wrapped within just 20 days before the onset of the COVID-19 pandemic and the post-production work proceeded shortly after the end of film shooting.

== Soundtrack ==
The soundtrack album features two songs. The first single titled "Inna Mylu" was unveiled on 22 April 2021 and it became an instant hit, receiving 30 million views in YouTube.

Soundtrack
No.	Title	Music	Singer(s)	Length
1.	"Inna Mylu"	Britto Michael	Rajesh, Sivakarthikeyan, Poovaiyar, Kamala Kannan	4:16
2.	"Hey Bro"	Britto Michael	Krithika Nelson, Ben Kingsley, Adheef Muhamed	3:08
