= Sangeetha Sajith =

Indian playback singer

- Born: 1976; Kottayam, Kerala, India
- Died: May 22, 2022 (aged 45–46)
- Occupation: Playback singer
- Years active: 1992–2021
- Musical career
- Genres: Indian classical music; Playback singing; Filmi
- Instrument: Vocals

Sangeetha Sajith (1976 – 22 May 2022) was an Indian playback singer, known for her works in the South Indian film industry. She has sung over 200 songs across Malayalam, Tamil, Telugu and Kannada films. Sangeetha got her breakthrough with the song "Thaneerai Kaadhalikum" from the 1996 Tamil film Mr. Romeo, composed by A. R. Rahman.

== Life and career ==
Sangeetha made her playback singing debut in 1992 through the Tamil film Naalaiya Theerpu. Her debut in the Malayalam film industry came in 1998 with the song Ambilipoovattam Ponnurulil from the movie Ennu Swantham Janakikutty. She is known among the Malayali audience for the Malayalam songs like "Dhum Dhum Dhum Dureyeto" from Raakilipattu, "Aalare Govinda" from Kakkakuyil, "Odathandil Talam Kotum" from Kerala Varma Pazhassi Raja and "Thaalam Poyi Thappum Poyi" from Ayyappanum Koshiyum. The theme song of Prithviraj starrer Kuruthi was her last song in Malayalam.

Sangeeta has sung for more than 100 audio cassettes in Malayalam and Tamil. She has also composed the music for the film Adukkalail Pani Undu. Sangeetha was also known for imitating KB Sundarambal's voice. When Sangeetha sang during Tamil Nadu government's film award ceremony, the then Chief Minister Jayalalitha, who was a witness, came up to the stage and presented Sangeetha with a gold necklace from her neck.

== Discography ==
Tamil

Year	Film	Song	Composer	Co-singer(s)
1992	Naalaiya Theerpu	"MTV Parthuputta"	Manimekalai	
1994	Sarigamapadani	"Paithiyam Paithiyam"	Deva	
1995	Lucky Man	"Pallana Party "	Adithyan	Adithyan
1995	Lucky Man	"Yaar Seidha Mayam"	Adithyan	S. P. Balasubrahmanyam
1995	Maaman Magal	“Vadugapatti Vayasu Kutti”	Adithyan	Shahul Hameed
1996	Mr. Romeo	"Thaneerai Kaadhalikum"	A. R. Rahman	
1996	Kizhakku Mugam	"Aathukullea"	Adithyan	P. Unni Krishnan
1998	Jeans	"Varayo Thozhi"	A. R. Rahman	Sonu Nigam, Shahul Hameed, Harini,
2000	Snegithiye	"Radhai Manathil"	Vidyasagar	K. S. Chithra, Sujatha
2000	Snegithiye	"Kalluri Malare"	Vidyasagar	K. S. Chithra, Sujatha
2006	Thalai Nagaram	"Soo Manthrakaali"	D. Imman	Funky Shankar, Sujatha
2019	Bigil	"Verithanam"	A. R. Rahman	Vijay

Malayalam

Year	Film	Song	Composer	Co-singer(s)
2019	Maarconi Mathaai	"Enna Parayana"	M. Jayachandran	Ajay Gopal, Bhanu Prakash, Nikhil Raj

== Death ==
Sangeetha died on 22 May 2022. She died after reportedly suffering from a kidney-related problem.
