= Amritha Aiyer =

Indian actress (born 1994)

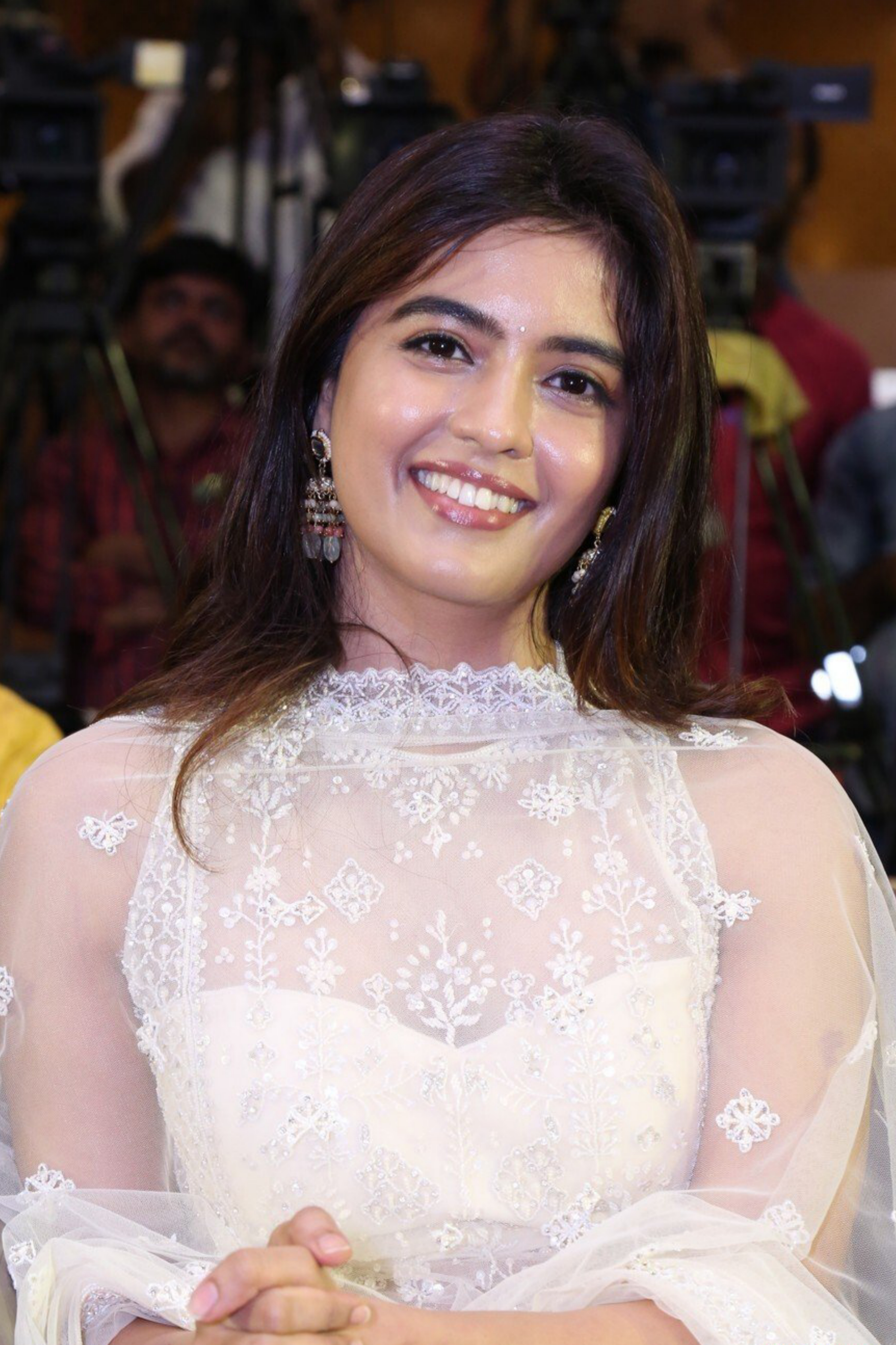
- Amritha in 2024
- Born: 14 May 1994 (age 32); Chennai, Tamil Nadu, India
- Education: St. Joseph's College of Commerce, Bangalore
- Occupation: Actress
- Years active: 2012–present

Amritha Aiyer (born 14 May 1994) is an Indian actress who appears predominantly in Tamil and Telugu films. Her first lead role was in the Tamil film Padaiveeran in 2018 and she has since starred in the Tamil films Bigil (2019) and Lift (2021) and Telugu films Red (2021), and Hanu Man (2024).

== Early life and education ==
Amritha was born into a Tamil-speaking family on 14 May 1994 in Chennai, Tamil Nadu, and raised in Bengaluru, Karnataka. She attended NHR School, Bangalore, and completed her degree in commerce at St. Joseph's College of Commerce, Bangalore.

== Career ==
She made her debut as lead actress in Padaiveeran (2018) opposite Vijay Yesudas, where she played the role of Malar. In response to her role, a reviewer of the film from The Hindu stated that "Amritha fits in her role aptly". She later played a lead role opposite Vijay Antony in Kaali (2018). In 2019, she was to make her Kannada debut with Gramayana starring Vinay Rajkumar, but the project was stalled after the producer got COVID. She played the role of Thendral, the Tamil Nadu football team captain, in Atlee's Bigil (2019), alongside Vijay.

In 2021, Aiyer made her Telugu debut in Red, opposite Ram Pothineni, and directed by Kishore Tirumala. Her second release was Vanakkam Da Mappilei opposite G. V. Prakash Kumar, a film released directly via Sun NXT. Her third release was Lift, the film opt for the theatrical release and directly released via Disney+ Hotstar.

Her only release in 2022, was a Tamil film Coffee with Kadhal opposite Jai.

Aiyer then shot for Telugu film Hanu-Man opposite Teja Sajja. and an untitled Tamil-Telugu bilingual film, opposite Teejay Arunachalam. The film Hanu-Man premiered on 12 January 2024. He broke several box-office records for a Telugu film.

== Filmography ==
Key
| † | Denotes films that have not yet been released |

List of Amritha Aiyer films and roles
| Year | Title | Role(s) | Language(s) | Notes | Ref. |
|---|---|---|---|---|---|
| 2012 | Padmavyooham | Girlfriend on beach | Malayalam | Uncredited | |
| 2014 | Tenaliraman | Maadhulai's friend | Tamil | credited as Amritha | |
| 2014 | Arima Nambi | Mall food court customer | Tamil | Uncredited | |
| 2014 | Lingaa | Villager | Tamil | credited as Amritha | |
| 2015 | Yatchan | Kumaran Tours & Travels worker | Tamil | credited as Amritha | |
| 2016 | Pokkiri Raja | Joshna | Tamil | credited as Amritha | |
| 2016 | Theri | Mithra's friend | Tamil | Uncredited | |
| 2018 | Padaiveeran | Malar | Tamil | Lead debut film | |
| 2018 | Kaali | Thenmozhi | Tamil | | |
| 2019 | Bigil | Thendral | Tamil | | |
| 2021 | Red | Gayathri | Telugu | Telugu debut | |
| 2021 | 30 Rojullo Preminchadam Ela | Akshara / Ammayigaru | Telugu | | |
| 2021 | Vanakkam Da Mappilei | Thulasi | Tamil | | |
| 2021 | Lift | Harini | Tamil | | |
| 2021 | Arjuna Phalguna | Sravani | Telugu | | |
| 2022 | Coffee with Kaadhal | Abhinaya "Abi" | Tamil | | |
| 2024 | Hanu-Man | Meenakshi | Telugu | | |
| 2024 | Bachchala Malli | Kaveri | Telugu | | |
| 2026 | Leader | Renuka | Tamil | | |
| 2026 | Love Insurance Kompany | Vandana | Tamil | Cameo appearance | |

=== Short films ===
List of Amritha Aiyer short film credits
| Year | Title | Role | Ref. |
|---|---|---|---|
| 2016 | Highway Kaadhali | Sneha | |
| 2021 | Buffoon Kadhal | Herself | |
