= Bigil =

2019 Indian Tamil film by Atlee

- Theatrical release poster
- Directed by: Atlee
- Screenplay by: Atlee; S. Ramana Girivasan
- Story by: Atlee
- Produced by: Kalpathi S. Aghoram; Kalpathi S. Ganesh; Kalpathi S. Suresh
- Starring: Vijay; Nayanthara; Jackie Shroff; Kathir; Vivek
- Cinematography: G. K. Vishnu
- Edited by: Ruben
- Music by: Songs: A. R. Rahman; Score: A. R. Rahman; Qutub-E-Kripa
- Production company: AGS Entertainment
- Distributed by: Screen Scene Media Entertainment
- Release date: 25 October 2019
- Running time: 179 minutes
- Country: India
- Language: Tamil
- Budget: ₹180 crore
- Box office: est. ₹285–300 crore (Note: According to Firstpost, the film grossed ₹285 crore worldwide. Business Today, and News18 stated that the film grossed ₹300 crore.)

Bigil (transl. Whistle) is a 2019 Indian Tamil-language sports action drama film directed and co-written by Atlee and produced by AGS Entertainment. The film stars Vijay in the main dual lead role as father and son, alongside an ensemble cast of Nayanthara, Jackie Shroff, Vivek, Kathir, Daniel Balaji, Anandaraj, Yogi Babu, I. M. Vijayan, Arjan Bajwa, Indhuja Ravichandran, Reba Monica John, Amritha Aiyer, and Varsha Bollamma. It is the third collaboration of Vijay with Atlee after Theri (2016) and Mersal (2017). The film follows Michael "Bigil" Rayappan, a former footballer give up his dream and turned into a gangster after his father's death but ends up as coach of a women's football team after his friend is injured.

The film was officially announced in November 2018 under the tentative title Thalapathy 63, as it is Vijay's 63rd film and the official title was announced in June 2019.Principal photography commenced in January 2019. It was predominantly shot in Chennai, with a minor schedule in Delhi, and wrapped by mid-August. The film has music composed by A. R. Rahman, cinematography handled by G. K. Vishnu and editing by Ruben.

Bigil was released on 25 October 2019, coinciding with the occasion of Diwali, and received mixed to positive reviews from critics. The film emerged as the highest-grossing Tamil film of 2019 and the second highest grossing South Indian film of 2019 after Saaho, collecting around ₹285−300 crore upon its release. It further became one of the highest-grossing Tamil films and the highest-grossing film of Vijay's career at that time until it was surpassed by Varisu and Leo (both 2023). The film won two awards each at the Zee Cine Awards Tamil, Ananda Vikatan Cinema Awards, three Edison Awards and a SIIMA Award.

== Plot ==
Michael is a gangster from Royapuram, Chennai who works to help his slum. He has a comical relationship with his girlfriend, Angel Aasirvatham, and a running feud with Daniel, a rival gangster. One night, Daniel attacks Michael and his close friend Kathir, who is the coach of the Tamil Nadu women's football team. Kathir is injured during the attack and becomes paralysed for a year. The team blamed Michael for his condition and ousted him. To allow the team to take part in the upcoming national championship in Delhi, Kathir requests the Tamil Nadu Football Association to replace him with his former teammate Bigil, who is actually Michael.

Seven years earlier, Michael was an aspiring footballer who, along with Kathir, played an important role in the Tamil Nadu football team's success. His father, Rayappan, is a crime boss who feuded with Daniel's father, Alex. Rayappan encourages Michael's passion for football, as he does not want him to end up in a life of crime. When Michael was unable to play for the Indian national team due to Rayappan's criminal record, Rayappan personally took up the matter with AIFF president J.K. Sharma and forcefully ensured that he included Michael and Kathir in the team's preliminary squad. However, Michael's career gets cut short just when he is about to leave for Delhi to attend the national team trials, Rayappan was stabbed to death by Alex and Daniel. Michael kills Alex in front of Daniel and stays in Chennai to become the new leader of Rayappan's gang. Michael's absence caused the team to lose in the trials, which sent them back home. Kathir met Michael, who asked him to organise a women's football team, and they worked together to select women who were struggling and poor, giving them everything.

Back to the present, Michael confronts Daniel and attempts to kill him for the earlier attack, but the police intervene to arrest Daniel and imprison him. Michael later accepts Kathir's request to coach the Tamil Nadu women's team, and he returns to football before leaving for Delhi with Angel and the team. However, due to his criminal background, the women refuse to cooperate with him and even blame him for the team's opening loss to Manipur in the national championship. Dejected, Michael reaches out to Sharma to resign, but soon discovers that Sharma is targeting him in revenge for the humiliation that he had faced at the hands of Rayappan to allow him into the national team and was the one who sent armed assailants to attack Michael before the match.

However, Michael convinces the women to support him and trains them vigorously to win the championship. He even manages to bring back two former key players to boost the team's strength: Gayathri, a Brahmin girl who quit football after marrying into a conservative family, and Anitha, who is in depression and refuses to even leave her room ever since a man threw acid on her when she spurned his advances. Angel motivates a pregnant Gayathri to continue playing football. Despite Sharma trying to rig Tamil Nadu's next match against Haryana to eliminate them, they won the match and all of the matches after that, eventually reaching the final, a rematch with Manipur in Chennai.

On the eve of the final, Vembu is kidnapped and forcefully injected with cocaine by Daniel, who is bailed out of prison and hired by Sharma to sabotage Tamil Nadu's chances of winning the championship. Though she recovered, she was unable to play in the final as she would fail the drug test. The team's captain, Thendral, is also kidnapped by Daniel, who attempts to forcefully inject cocaine into her as well; Michael also gets kidnapped by Daniel and is injected with cocaine. Michael manages to beat Daniel's men, chases Daniel to his house, and proceeds to kill him, but when he sees Daniel's young son, he changes his mind and spares Daniel, as he realises he does not want the young boy's future to become like his by killing Daniel.

The next day, Tamil Nadu plays Manipur in the final. The match turned out to be a thriller, with Tamil Nadu winning the championship through a penalty shoot-out. Michael and the team dedicate their success to Kathir, who was watching the match from the dugout in a wheelchair. Michael later exposed Sharma for drug possession, leading to his arrest and subsequent execution when he was on holiday in Malaysia. A few months later, Michael quits rowdyism and takes up football coaching for children, with one of his students being Daniel's son, who has now made peace with Michael.

== Cast ==
- Vijay in a dual role as:
  - Michael Rayappan alias Bigil, a former footballer-turned goon, later coach of the Tamil Nadu Women's Football Team.
  - Rayappan, Michael's late father, a crime boss
- Nayanthara as Dr. Angel Aasirvatham, Michael's love interest, later the team's official physiotherapist (Voice dubbed by Deepa Venkat)
- Jackie Shroff as J.K. Sharma, All India Football Federation president (Voice dubbed by Nizhalgal Ravi)
- Kathir as Kathir, Michael's teammate
- Vivek as Nessi
- Daniel Balaji as Daniel
- Anandaraj as Anand, Michael's and Rayappan's henchman
- Yogi Babu as Donald, Michael's henchman
- I. M. Vijayan as Alex, Daniel's father
- Indhuja Ravichandran as Vembu
- Amritha Aiyer as Thendral, the Tamil Nadu women's team captain
- Reba Monica John as Anitha
- Varsha Bollamma as Gayathri Sudarshan
- Indraja Shankar as Pandiyamma
- Gayathri Reddy as Maari
- Aadhirai Soundarajan as Minnoli
- Kanimozhi as Kanimozhi
- Shobana as Shobana
- Vinaya Seshan as Thamarai
- Riddhi Ramesh as Selvi
- Devadarshini as Elizabeth, Michael's sister
- Rohini as Anitha's mother
- G. Gnanasambandam as Aasirvatham, Angel's father
- Rama as Angel's mother
- Sai Dheena as Dheena, Michael's friend
- Manobala as Angel's professor
- Soundararaja as Guna, a police officer and Michael's friend
- Abi Saravanan as John
- Prajuna Sarah as Mary, Elizabeth's daughter
- T. M. Karthik as Sharma's assistant
- George Maryan as the church father
- Mathew Varghese as a police inspector
- Anish Kuruvilla as Inspector Ravi Kottarakka
- Tanvie Hans as Hemam, captain of Manipur women's team
- Arun Venugopal as a commentator
- Raman Vijayan as a commentator
- Sahithya Jagannathan as a commentator
- RJ Balaji as a commentator
- Arun Alexander as a minister
- Bigil Siva as Sudharshan, Gayathri's husband
- RJ Ananthi as a commentator
- Aathma Patrick as Michael's friend
- Nithyaraj as Michael's friend
- TSR Srinivasan as Michael's friend
- Gana Balachander as himself and as a kuthu rapper in Rayappan's area
- Amoolya Kamal as a Tamil Nadu women's football team player
- Leo Thomas as a football player
- Munivel as a football player

=== Cameo appearances ===
- Arjan Bajwa as Samar, Coach of Manipur Women's Football Team and Michael's rival
- Poovaiyar as himself in the song "Verithanam"
- A. R. Rahman as himself in the song "Singappenney"
- Atlee as himself in the song "Singappenney"

Nithila, Rithika, Thavamani, Soumya, Suganya, and Chamundeshwari played members of the Tamil Nadu women's team. Sasi, Umashankar, Aravindan, Sriram, Karthik, Mani, Praveendran, Nandha Kumar, Bharath, Idris, Vinoth, Anuf, Anand, Dhruva, Charles, Ajith Vignesh, Karthik, Shiva and Surparanikam played football players in a match against Bigil.

== Production ==
=== Development ===
During the production of Sarkar (2018), it was reported that directors H. Vinoth, Hari, Mohan Raja and Perarasu will be roped in to helm Vijay's 63rd film, tentatively being titled Thalapathy 63. However, in August 2018, Atlee confirmed that he will direct Thalapathy 63, thereby marking his third collaboration with the actor after Theri (2016) and Mersal (2017). Speaking about this, in an interview with a radio channel, he stated that "the film would be bigger and better than the films of their previous associations", and also confirmed that he started working on the scripting process of the film. Archana Kalpathi, the creative producer of AGS Entertainment, had announced that they had acquired the rights for the production, marking the studio's first film with the actor.

"It was Vijay sir who wanted me to work on the floor, and be the creative producer. My role was decided during that first meeting [...] We were trying for six years, and we were always in touch with him. With Bigil, it fell in place perfectly. We had his dates, and we liked Atlee’s script. It fit into the AGS style of films, as we prefer not doing run-of-the-mill entertainers.

— Archana Kalpathi, creative producer of Bigil

The film was officially announced on 14 November 2018, with a puja ceremony being conducted to commence the launch. A. R. Rahman was reported to compose the music and original score for the film, collaborating with Vijay for the fifth time after Udhaya (2004), Azhagiya Tamil Magan (2007), Mersal (2017) and Sarkar (2018), and with Atlee for the second time after Mersal. The technical crew consisted of cinematographer G. K. Vishnu, editor Ruben, art director T. Muthuraj, stunt director Anal Arasu, all of them were associated in Mersal, while Atlee's regular collaborator, S. Ramana Girivasan, wrote the dialogues for the film. The film was reported to be a sports action film with commercial elements.

By late-November 2018, art director Muthuraj began working on the construction of the sets at Binny Mills in Chennai. By early-December 2018, Atlee, Vishnu and Kalpathi went to Los Angeles for location scouting to shoot a significant portion of the film. Ajay Devgn's NY VFXWAALA was hired to supervise the visual effects. Vijay was reported to play the role of a sportsperson-turned-coach and for his role, he was trained under fitness expert Kannan Narayanan to gain few kilos for the role. He further undergone special training in football, under the guidance of popular sports coordinator, Aimee McDaniel, known for her work in films like Million Dollar Arm (2014), Pelé: Birth of a Legend (2016) and the web television series 13 Reasons Why (2017–2020). Additional sports choreography were done by former English footballer Justin Skinner. Coaching and physiotherapy were done by Nivetha and Kanaga Lakshmi, respectively. It was made on a budget of ₹180 crore (US$19 million), thereby being the production house's most expensive film up to that point.

=== Casting ===
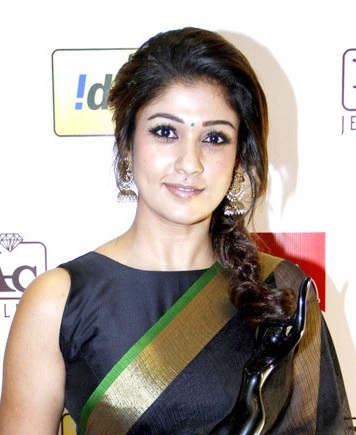
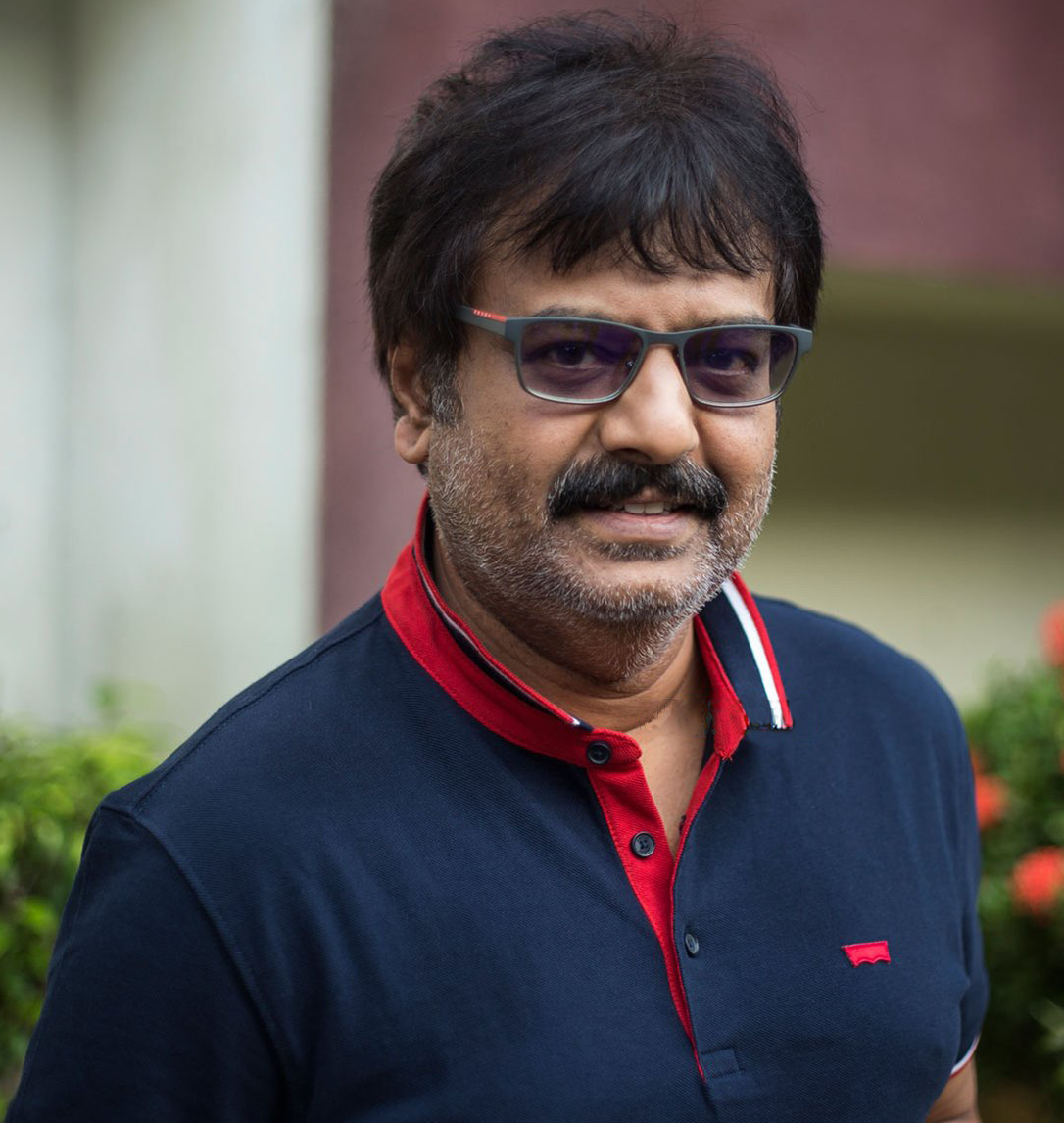
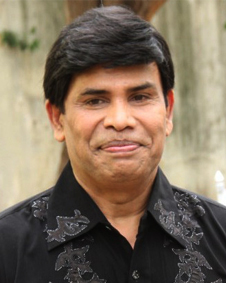
Nayanthara (left), Vivek (middle) and Anandaraj (right) were signed for pivotal roles in the film, collaborating with Vijay, after a decade long-gap.

As the film is based on women's football, the team had finalised 16 women actors for the role. The team approached Kiara Advani to play the female lead, who denied the offer. Shortly after the film's launch, in November 2018, it was reported that Rashmika Mandanna will be a part of the film. However, Nayanthara was selected to play the female lead role, while Vivek and Anandaraj joined the film as a supporting role. The actors collaborate with Vijay, for a decade long-gap, with Vivek's last collaboration with Vijay was Kuruvi (2008), whereas for Nayanthara and Anandaraj, was Villu (2009). Yogi Babu was selected to play a comic role in the film. In mid-January 2019, Kathir was signed for a pivotal role, while Daniel Balaji attended the film's launch, thereby confirming his presence in the film. His character was reported to have negative shades. Rajkumar was chosen as a part of the film's cast, but it was proved to be untrue.

In February 2019, Poovaiyar, a contestant of the reality show Super Singer Junior, aired on Star Vijay, was cast in a brief role for this film. By March 2019, Soundararaja was reported to appear in a pivotal role and had allotted 30-days of call sheet for the film. Rumours being speculated that former politician-turned-actor Nanjil Sampath will play the antagonist, after his acting debut with LKG (2019). However, he was not approached by the team. On 21 March 2019, Jackie Shroff was hired to play a negative role in the film, whose character is reported to be a president of the All India Football Federation. The same month, Reba Monica John was signed in for the project. She shared her still from the film, whose role was revealed to be an acid attack survivor-cum-footballer.

By April, veteran actor-orator G. Gnanasambandam was roped in to play Nayanthara's father, and Indhuja Ravichandran was also signed for the project. Later, Varsha Bollamma and Indraja Shankar, daughter of comic actor Robo Shankar, were chosen to play female footballers. Amritha Aiyer was chosen to play the captain of the women's team, while Karnataka-based footballer Riddhi Ramesh and Gayathri Reddy made their debut in the film, by playing one of the few footballers. Kerala-based ex-footballer and actor I. M. Vijayan played one of the antagonists in the film. During the production of the film, Bollywood actor Shah Rukh Khan was rumoured for playing a cameo appearance. However, sources close to the actor denied such claims.

=== Filming ===
Principal photography for Thalapathy 63 started on 21 January 2019, with a small puja ceremony held at Binny Mills in Chennai. The first schedule of the film took place beginning with an action sequence, which went on for 20 days. In mid-February 2019, the team constructed a huge set for the introduction song (titled "Verithanam") with more than 250 dancers, including 100 children's and extras that took place for four days. A replica of Napier Bridge was erected at the EVP Film City in Chennai, where another action sequence was being shot. The second schedule of the film began on 6 March 2019, were shooting took place at the outskirts of SRM Institute of Science and Technology. In mid-March, actress Nayanthara joined the sets for shooting a wedding scene in a church near Guindy, where several other actors participated in this schedule.

Muthuraj's art-direction team had constructed a huge football set at EVP Film City at a cost of ₹6 crore (US$620,000) for the third schedule. The team believed that shooting at a real stadium might apparently cost around ₹18 crore (US$1.9 million), and the difficulties on obtaining permission from the authorities as the schedule takes place continuously for 50 days. In an interview to Srinivasa Ramanujam, vice-editor of The Hindu, Kalpathi said that as an integral part of the script, the team planned to shoot a football fields in various parts of the country, including few stadiums across Northeast India. In the process, they faced several challenges, as most of the stadiums had rules, timings for shoot and specific areas for cameras. As a result, they decided to construct a huge stadium-like set for the film. Further, the team used extensive visual effects for filming the football sequences as they could not shoot all matches in the same space, and the team further sourced special lighting techniques from China, which consisted of nine lakh watts. She added "For every match, the structure had to change and spectators had to wear the team’s jerseys. All these were big challenges. Filming Bigil was like building ten theatres". During the shooting of the film, an electrician named Selvaraj was hospitalised after a focus light fell from a height of 100 feet onto him, sustaining injuries.

After 70 days of continuous shoot, the film entered its fourth schedule on 6 May 2019. Several pictures from the stadium sets constructed at EVP Film City, were leaked onto internet during mid-May 2019. A song shoot for the film, took place at Gokulam Studios in Chennai, during mid-May 2019, which was followed by a minor sequence filmed at Feathers Hotel in Chennai. Later, several sequences were filmed at the outskirts of Chennai during late-May and early-June. On 13 June 2019, the team went to Delhi for a two-week long schedule to shoot significant portions in the film.

By late-June, the team returned to Chennai to shoot few sequences at EVP Film City. The film's final schedule commenced on 3 August 2019 at Perambur and took place for a week. Principal shooting completed on 14 August 2019, and the film entered through post-production phase. On the last day of shoot, the team gifted 400 gold rings, imprinting the film's title Bigil, to all the technicians who worked in this film. In March 2020, Vijay's original bike stunt video from the film's shooting spot, went viral on social media.

== Music ==
The film's original score and soundtrack album were composed by A. R. Rahman, with lyrics written by Vivek. Bigil marks Rahman's second collaboration with Atlee after Mersal, and also his fifth collaboration with Vijay. The album features five songs, with three singles – "Singappenney", "Verithanam" and "Unakkaga" being released on 23 July 1 and 18 September respectively. The music rights of the film were acquired by Sony Music India. Actor Vijay, sung one song "Verithanam" which is the first time Vijay, has sung for a film composed by Rahman. The film's music was released at the audio launch event held on 27 September 2019 at Sai Leo Muthu Indoor Stadium, Sri Sai Ram Engineering College, Chennai, with the presence of the film's cast and crew and all the other celebrities. The songs were released at all digital platforms, the very same day, of the launch. A month after the film's release, an album with two additional songs written by Vivek – "Kaalame" sung by Bamba Bakya, and "Idharkuthaan" was sung by Dhee with additional vocals from Sunitha Sarathy and Arjun Chandy – was released in November 2019.

== Marketing ==
The film's title Bigil was announced on 21 June 2019, the eve of Vijay's birthday. The first look was released on the same day, featuring Vijay in a double role: one a footballer, and the other as a gangster. Vijay wears a salt-and-pepper hairstyle for this film. The film's second look poster was released on 22 June at midnight, featuring a multi-dimensional format of Vijay, and another poster was released on the evening of the same day, with Vijay holding a cycle chain as a similar reference to Thirumalai (2003). The new poster from the film was released on 28 August 2019, featuring Vijay, Anandaraj, Yogi Babu and others.

The theatrical trailer was released on 12 October 2019, and upon its release, it crossed 14 million views within 14 hours. The film's trailer crossed 2 million likes, within four days, becoming the most liked Indian trailer. Its record was beaten by Sushant Singh Rajput's posthumous film Dil Bechara (2020), which went on to become the world's most liked trailer, crossing more than 10 million likes. Nevertheless, the trailers of both the films, were listed in the most liked trailers of the world. As of 19 February 2020, it is the most viewed Tamil trailer, registering more than 50 million views.

As a part of promotional purposes, AGS Entertainment teamed up with Chennai City FC, an Indian professional football club, to organise a mini knockout tournament at Tiki Taka, Velachery (Chennai) on 19–20 October 2019. The tournament consisted of 64 teams, with five members per team hailing from different states across India. The producers further partnered with Chennaiyin FC for the 6th season of Indian Super League. Further, a virtual FIFA Esports championship was organised by the AGS and Chennaiyin FC, in collaboration with Skyesports. The tournament was conducted at Woot Gaming Lounge (Kochi) on 15 October 2019 and in Arkmensis Gaming India (Chennai) on 17–20 October 2019. A new Twitter emoji for the film was launched for the film's marketing purposes. The official merchandise of the film was launched by Cover It Up, prior to the release.

== Release ==
=== Theatrical ===
Bigil was released on 25 October 2019, two days ahead of the Diwali festival (27 October 2019) clashing with Akshay Kumar-starrer Housefull 4 and Karthi-starrer Kaithi. The film was Vijay's third consecutive Diwali release following Mersal in 2017 and Sarkar in 2018. The film was showcased in more than 4200 screens worldwide, with the creative producer Archana Kalpathi, saying it as "the widest release in Vijay's career". Film producer G. Dhananjayan interviewed to the media channel Indiaglitz, stating that the film will be screened in more than 700 theatres across Tamil Nadu. The film was also screened in over 400 theatres across Karnataka, 650 theatres across Andhra Pradesh and Telangana, 250 theatres in Kerala and 200 theatres across North India. In the overseas circuits, it was premiered in more than 700 screens in 45 countries such as United States, United Kingdom, Canada, Malaysia, Singapore, Sri Lanka and France. It also became the first Tamil film to be screened in IMAX format. Kalpathi eventually planned for a wide release of the film in China, due to the overwhelming reception of Indian films in the country, but it was not released as per plans. Bigil was the first Tamil film to be released in Egypt and Jordan, where it was premiered in the countries on 30 October and 5 November, respectively.

=== Distribution ===
The overall pre-release business of the film is anticipated to be in the region of ₹350–400 crore (US$42–48 million), including theatrical, satellite, digital, audio and dubbing rights. According to a report from International Business Times, the film recovered 60% of the investment levied by the production company. The film's distribution rights were acquired by Screen Scene Media Entertainment for ₹100 crore (US$10 million), deciding to pay a major portion of the price upfront against the usual norm. Screen Scene sold the film to its area-wise sub-distributors: Gopuram Films (Chennai), Kalayaippan Films (Chengalpet), Karpagam Films (Trichy and Thanjavur), Sushma Cine Arts (Salem) Surya Movies (Madurai and Ramnad), Linda Big Pictures (North and South Arcot) Kanthaswamy Cine Arts (Coimbatore) and Vasundhara Devi Cine Films (Tirunelveli and Kanyakumari).

United India Exporters and X Gen Studios have jointly bought the overseas theatrical rights for the film for ₹90 crore (US$9.3 million). The Andhra Pradesh and Telangana distribution rights have been bought by Mahesh S. Koneru under the banner East Coast Productions for ₹30 crore (US$3.1 million). The Karnataka theatrical rights were sold to the distributor Gokul Raj for ₹30 crore (US$3.1 million). Actor Prithviraj Sukumaran bought the film's distribution rights in Kerala for ₹25 crore which was distributed under his Prithviraj Productions and Magic Frames banner. The film's Hindi dubbing rights were purchased by Goldmines Telefilms.

=== Pre-sale records ===
In mid-October, Novo Cinemas which distributed the film in United Arab Emirates had announced the advanced bookings of the film in Abu Dhabi, Dubai and Sharjah; Within 24 hours, more than 10,000 tickets for the opening weekend has been sold in advance, which is "a record for an Indian film" according to International Business Times. With the release date being officially announced, few theatres in Tamil Nadu began advanced bookings for the film on 18 October 2019, following the exorbitant response in the trade. Raj Theatre located in Saidapet (Chennai) was the first to announce bookings for four shows in the theatre. The full-fledged reservations for the film began during 21 October, for major parts of Tamil Nadu that includes in Chennai, Madurai, Trichy, Tirunelveli and Coimbatore.

Rakesh Gowthaman, the managing director of Vettri Cinemas announced that 6,000 tickets for the opening weekend were sold within 90 minutes, while according to Rakki Cinemas, more than 7,000 tickets were sold within an hour. Udeep Reddy, managing director of Mayajaal stated that "The prediction is that the film is likely to earn more than ₹150 crore to recover the ₹80-plus crore price that the distributors have paid. We hope the film can do that kind of business since it is Deepavali and people are looking to go to movies. Bigil will once again bring families back into the theatres." G. Dhananjayan, in his interview to The Hindu had stated that tickets for the first four days have been sold out, and said that "the distributors are trying to make the maximum in the first four days by screening in every theatres".

According to Koimoi, bookings in the major metropolitan cities — Chennai, Hyderabad, Bangalore, Kochi, Mumbai and Delhi — received tremendous response, with more than 70% of the shows being booked for the opening day, with few cities reporting full occupancy. By the second and third day, while Chennai had 100% shows being booked, Mumbai and Delhi had 75% shows being filled. In Kochi about 60% shows were booked for the film, while 50% of the shows were booked in advance in Bangalore and Hyderabad. Trade analysts believed that the film will take an "earth-shattering opening".

=== Complications ===
The ticket prices were ranged from ₹700–1,500 in single screens and limited multiplexes across Chennai. Despite Tamil Nadu government's order on controlling the ticket prices, many theatres levied prices for the opening day shows, which was six times higher than the normal ticket price. Distributors opined that, they had bought the film for huge prices that cannot be covered through normal ticket rates, as a result, they demanded huge ticket rates for the film. However, theatre owners feared that they might be subjected to strict action from the government, even leading to suspension of theatre licence. Few theatres were reluctant to screen the film due to the complications on levying a deal with distributors, demanding huge price for ticket rates.

Prior to the release, on 23 October 2019, the Tamil Nadu government denied permission to screen early morning shows for the film, and Karthi-starrer Kaithi (2019), in response to the queries regarding tickets being sold at exorbitant rates. The Minister of Information and Publicity, Kadambur Raju stated on Twitter saying "I have already sent the statement related to the cancellation of special shows. I have urged them [theatres] to refund the money to those who had made reservations. Through this initiative, the practice of charging exorbitant rates for special shows will be stopped." Few reports claimed that Vijay's speech at the film's audio launch targeting the state government, being the reason for the cancellation of early morning shows for the film. After the distributors and theatre owners meeting with the officials and ministers, the government granted permission for early morning shows starting at 4:00 a.m.

=== Home media ===
The satellite rights of the film were secured by Sun TV Network which also secured the rights for the film's dubbed versions in other South Indian languages also. The global television premiere of Bigil took place on Sun TV on 15 January 2020, coinciding with the Thai Pongal festival, and registered a TRP rating of 23.5, with 16473 crore impressions. The digital rights were sold to Amazon Prime Video. Bigil along with its dubbed Telugu version Whistle was premiered through the streaming platform on 13 December 2019.

=== Controversies ===
==== Copyright infringement allegations ====
In August 2019, assistant director K. P. Selvah filed a lawsuit against Atlee for violating the copyright of his story registered with the Writer's Association. He also ordered an interim injunction restraining the shoot and release of the film. It was rejected by the Madras High Court dismissing the claims of Selvah, who later submitted a fresh suit in the claims of the same. The court, however, denied his queries to stall the release. Another plea on the same case was filed at Telangana High Court, by independent filmmaker Nandi Chinni Kumar. He alleged that certain portions of the film, along with the Nagraj Manjule-directed Hindi film Jhund, bore similarities to his film, Slum Soccer, based on Akhilesh Paul, a don-turned-footballer from Maharashtra. Kumar stated that he had bought the copyrights exclusively from Paul to make a film on any language under his consent, and owed him ₹5 lakh (US$5,200). In response to his plea, the Telangana High Court, on 6 December 2019, passed an order with the digital premiere of the film on Amazon Prime Video to be stalled temporarily, which was later withdrawn.

==== Income tax raid ====
On 5 February 2020, the Income Tax Department raided Vijay's residence in Chennai and was inquired regarding potential tax evasion regarding his investment in immovable properties which he inherited from the film's producers. Vijay was investigated when he was shooting for Master (2021) in Neyveli, thereby disrupting the film's shoot. Nearly ₹77 crore was seized by the officials from properties belonging to AGS Entertainment, the creative producer of Bigil, Archana Kalpathi and film financer G. N. Anbu Chezhiyan's residence. On 13 March 2020, the IT department raided Vijay's residence again and had said that nothing significant was found during the raid and Vijay has paid all taxes. It further released figures from a tax evasion probe showing that Vijay received ₹50 crore for the film, while another figure from Income Tax released in February 2020, stated that the actor received ₹30 crore as remuneration.

== Reception ==
=== Box office ===
In the opening day of its release, the film collected ₹58 crore (US$6.0 million), and became the highest-opening day grosser of 2019, beating Petta, which earned ₹36.6 crore (US$3.8 million) on the first day. It was the second highest-opener of Vijay, behind Sarkar (2018) and preceded by Mersal (2017), which respectively earned ₹47.1 crore (US$4.9 million) and ₹66.9 crore (US$6.9 million). The film collected ₹25.6 crore (US$2.7 million) in Tamil Nadu, and in Chennai, the film had earned an estimated collection of ₹1.8 crore (US$190,000) in Chennai theatres. In Andhra Pradesh and Telangana, the film collected ₹4.15 crore (US$430,000) and in Karnataka and Kerala, the film contributed ₹4.1 crore (US$430,000) and ₹1.5 crore (US$160,000), respectively, with the total collections in the country, on the first day, being ₹40.05 crore (US$4.2 million). The film entered the 100 crore mark worldwide on the second day of its release, where the film collected ₹46.5 crore (US$4.8 million) worldwide, with ₹25 crore (US$2.6 million) across the country. By the third day, the film had obtained its first weekend collections to ₹5.26 crore (US$550,000) in Chennai.

Bigil earned about more than ₹75 crore (US$7.8 million) in the first four days of its release in Tamil Nadu, while a worldwide collection of ₹150 crore (US$16 million) was reported for the first five days of the release. On the sixth day of its release, the film earned ₹200 crore (US$21 million) worldwide, becoming the actor's third film to do so after Mersal and Sarkar. Within 10 days of its release, the film earned ₹10 crore (US$1.0 million) at the Chennai city box-office, and became the fourth film of Vijay to cross 10-crore mark in Chennai. Within 11 days, the film collected about ₹250 crore (US$26 million). On 11 November 2019, AGS Entertainment had announced that the film had collected ₹300 crore (US$31 million), and became the highest-grossing Tamil film of the year, surpassing Petta. It also became the first film of the actor to earn ₹300 crore. The film has performed very well in Delhi and Mumbai, with sold-out shows at most locations in Mumbai the first week. In three weeks, the film had collected ₹13 crore from Chennai alone. The film grossed ₹143 crore in Tamil Nadu in the four-week run. Business Today stated a gross of ₹300 crore in its entire run.

The film premiered in United States, a day before the Indian release on 24 October 2019, and had collected US$215,434 (₹1.6 crore) with the premiere shows reported from 120 locations. According to trade analyst Taran Adarsh, the film collected A$171,887 (₹83.06 lakhs) at Australia and £109,112 [₹ 99.15 lakhs] in United Kingdom, on the first day of its release. Bigil collected US$1 million at the United States box office, thereby being Vijay's fourth film to do so after Theri (2016), Mersal (2017) and Sarkar (2018). By the first six days, the film collected ₹50 crore (US$5.2 million) in overseas territories. The film earned more than 33,000 entries in France, overtaking Mersal and Enthiran (2010). The film also earned GBP 588,234 in the United Kingdom surpassing highest Mersal which earned GBP 560,858. In first six days, the film has reported to have earned $2 million in Malaysia. It collected US$1.46 million at the U.S. box office. The film registered 35,000 footfalls in France highest for a Tamil film all-time in that country. As of 20 November 2019, the film collected about ₹93 crore (US$9.7 million) in the overseas centres.

=== Critical response ===
On the review aggregator website Rotten Tomatoes, 71% of 7 critics' reviews are positive, with an average rating of 5.5/10.

M. Suganth of The Times of India gave 3 out of 5 stars and called the film as "an engaging entertainer", despite lacking depth and being overlong. Sreedhar Pillai of Firstpost gave 3.25 out of 5 stars and wrote "Bigil is designed as a crowd-pleaser from the very word go; with the basic underdog story, women empowerment and equality as themes, it works to a large extent." He called it as "one of Vijay’s best films in recent times and he has shined in a difficult dual role, especially as the old man Rayappan with a stammer and gruffness in his voice".

Karthik Kumar of Hindustan Times wrote "Despite a problematic first half, the Atlee-directed Vijay starrer makes up in the second half with an emotionally rewarding end, and is excruciatingly long and if not for the football portion which is executed on a grand scale and visuals, the film would've struggled to stay afloat". S. Subakeerthana of The Indian Express gave 2.5 out of 5 stars and wrote "The manner, in which films manage to strike a chord between messaging and entertainment without trading the essentials of the universe, is interesting. Atlee pulls the loose threads together in the thrilling final match sequences, but Bigil isn’t Vijay’s Dangal or “Chak De! India on steroids” like Shah Rukh [Khan] had mentioned. Had Atlee put more thought into the screenplay, ideation and execution, this would have been a better film, compared to their earlier collaborations, Theri and Mersal."

Srinivasa Ramanujam of The Hindu called it as "an emotionally-strong tale from the Atlee-Vijay combo which could have used better writing and trimming". Baradwaj Rangan of Film Companion South wrote "The screenplay could have been tighter, but it’s still a model of how we can get serious even in the overblown world of a “mass” movie, and yet not forget to have fun." Janani K of India Today, gave three out of five stars and stated "Despite having more flaws than positives, Bigil is a treat for Vijay’s ardent fans". Karthik Keramalu of Huffington Post wrote "While Atlee’s intention, in spite of seeming ‘inspired’ from other movies, doesn't come across as sincere, it might help some folks pick up the ball".

Sowmya Rajendran of The News Minute gave 3.5 out of 5 stars and wrote "The film has all the elements of a mass entertainer and is also earnest in its attempt to break away from some cast-iron stereotypes". Manasa. R of The New Indian Express gave 2.5 out of 5 stars and wrote "There was solid scope to deliver a strong 'message', one of women's empowerment, but the film never lets it surpass the need to celebrate Vijay’s heroism". Anupama Subramanian of Deccan Chronicle gave 3 out of 5 stars and wrote "Bigil could have used a lot of trimming, especially in the first half. It is a deliberate attempt to convert the fans expectation of Vijay into a story about women’s empowerment. There’s of course the usual white knight complex, but at least it’s a start for Vijay to play more mature roles. Hope he does more of such script driven characters."

Sify gave 3.5 out of 5 stars and wrote "Bigil relies squarely on the charm of its leading man and Vijay dives into the character with an enthusiasm we haven't seen before. It is a paisa vasool mass, sports-action-entertainer which is sure to be enjoyed by the masses and family audiences". IndiaGlitz gave 2.75 out of five stating " Despite its predictability, Bigil is lead to a victory by the impressive Vijay!". A. Ganesh Nadar of Rediff.com wrote "Bigil packs in enough entertainment in its three-hour running time". Jose K. George of The Week wrote "Bigil may please Vijay fans, but fails as a sports drama, dedicated to women", while Umesh Punwani of Koimoi gave 3 out of 5 stars and wrote "Backed by an intriguing and emotional story, Vijay’s machoism is the main ingredient of this blatant commercial masala". Ananda Vikatan rated the film 41 out of 100.

=== Show cancellations ===
An article in India Today stated that some matinee and night shows of Bigil were cancelled at the Devi Paradise theatre in Chennai because of low audience turnout. According to the report, the theatre did not have enough patrons prompting cancellation of select shows and relocation of ticket holders to alternate screens.

== Legacy and impact ==
Bigil created much anticipation before its release, with Tamil film celebrities Sivakarthikeyan, Samantha Ruth Prabhu, Kajal Aggarwal, Lokesh Kanagaraj, Vignesh Shivan, Raghava Lawrence, politician J. Anbazhagan, Hindi film celebrities Karan Johar, Shah Rukh Khan, Varun Dhawan, Indian race driver Alisha Abdullah, Sri Lankan cricketer Russell Arnold, amongst others praising the film's trailer. Post-release, Johar called the film as "a roller coaster of emotions, triumph and adrenaline rush". Bigil has become an influential film for women. According to the coach of Madurai women's football team which recently won national qualifiers in Bangalore, parents are encouraging their daughters to take up football. Amritha Aiyer, who played the role of Thendral in the film, has been an established actress who went on to become a part of few Tamil and Telugu films.

According to a survey report by Twitter India, the film was featured in the most tweeted hashtags of 2019, becoming the only Indian film to be a part of it. Vijay, Atlee, A. R. Rahman and Archana Kalpathi were featured in the top 10 entertainment charts of India on Twitter. Post the demise of actor Sushant Singh Rajput, the film's creative producer Archana Kalpathi, revealed that Vijay's Rayappan character in the film's first look poster was inspired from Sushant's role in Chhichhore (2019).

It also led to several re-releases in 2020; after theatres being reopened in Germany and France, which was shut down as a precautionary measure due to COVID-19 pandemic, the film was re-released in these countries on 18 June 2020, coinciding the eve of Vijay's birthday. The film was re-released in the theatres of Sri Lanka on 24 July 2020, and in Singapore on 7 August 2020. Post the reopening of theatres in India, the film was re-released in Puducherry and Tamil Nadu on 10 November 2020. In July 2021, an incident where a ten-year boy was injured in an accident, was treated as the doctor apparently let the boy watch the film on his phone while completing the medical treatment, eventually becoming a lifesaver. This incident won the hearts of the fans.

== Accolades ==
Award (Note: Awards, festivals and organisations are in alphabetical order.)	Date of ceremony (Note: Date is linked to the article about the awards held that year, wherever possible.)	Category	Recipient(s) and nominee(s)	Result	Ref.
Ananda Vikatan Cinema Awards	11 January 2020	Best Choreographer	Shobi Paulraj, Lalitha Shobi	Won	
Ananda Vikatan Cinema Awards	11 January 2020	Most Popular Film	Bigil – AGS Entertainment	Won	
Ananda Vikatan Cinema Awards	11 January 2020	Best Music Director	A. R. Rahman	Nominated	
Edison Awards	15 January 2020	Best Film	Bigil – AGS Entertainment	Pending	
Edison Awards	15 January 2020	Best Director	Atlee	Pending	
Edison Awards	15 January 2020	Best Music Director	A. R. Rahman	Won	
Edison Awards	15 January 2020	Best Background Score	A. R. Rahman	Won	
Edison Awards	15 January 2020	Best Comedian	Yogi Babu	Pending	
Edison Awards	15 January 2020	Mass Hero of the Year	Vijay	Won	
South Indian International Movie Awards	18 September 2021	Best Actor – Tamil	Vijay	Nominated	
South Indian International Movie Awards	18 September 2021	Best Music Director – Tamil	A. R. Rahman	Nominated	
South Indian International Movie Awards	18 September 2021	Best Lyricist – Tamil	Vivek – ("Singappenney")	Won	
South Indian International Movie Awards	18 September 2021	Best Cinematographer – Tamil	G. K. Vishnu	Nominated	
Zee Cine Awards Tamil	4 January 2020	Favourite Heroine	Nayanthara	Won	
Zee Cine Awards Tamil	4 January 2020	Favorite Actor	Vijay	Won	
Zee Cine Awards Tamil	4 January 2020	Best Music Director	A. R. Rahman	Nominated	
Zee Cine Awards Tamil	4 January 2020	Favourite Song	"Verithanam"	Won	
