= Singappenney (song) =

Song from Bigil

Song by A. R. Rahman featuring Shashaa Tirupati

from the album Bigil
- Language: Tamil
- Released: 23 July 2019
- Recorded: 2019
- Studio: Panchathan Record Inn, Chennai
- Genre: Filmi, pop-folk, traditional music, Indian pop, Inspirational, Motivational
- Length: 6:04
- Label: Sony Music India
- Composer: A. R. Rahman
- Lyricist: Vivek
- Producer: A.R. Rahman

Music video
- "Singappenney" on YouTube

"Singappenney" (transl. Lioness) is a 2019 Indian Tamil language song composed and sung by A. R. Rahman, for the soundtrack album of the film Bigil. The song's lyrics were written by Vivek and featured additional vocals by Shashaa Tirupati. The song has a motivational theme for women, hailed as a women's anthem. The song was released as a first single track of the film on 23 July 2019. The song features Vijay including the 11 women football players. Rahman and Atlee Kumar has a special entrance in the film through this song.

== Background ==
The making begins with director Atlee and lyricist Vivek asking A. R. Rahman to compose a women's anthem, the former wanting a song to dedicate to all women, and the latter claiming that men are seen as strong while women are seen as delicate and wanting to change that mindset. Rahman plays the verse of the song on his piano; 'Singappenney, singappenney. Aaninamae unnai vanangume.' (Eng: Lion-queen bold. The entire male clan welcomes and salutes you)

== Composition ==
Singappenney starts with a flute prelude as Rahman and a choir from Rahman's musical group Qutub-E-Kripa singing the first line 'Maadhare' (Eng: Women) followed by beats performed by musician Vuvuri Kumar and a guitar by veteran musician Keba Jeremiah. The song proceeds with vocals provided by children as Rahman sings the hook. The mix of drums, percussion beats and the composer's signature piano set the tune for Rahman's vocals to follow. The composer delivers a good song that is both moving, hip, and catchy in its rhythm and structure.

Rahman sings the song with his high-pitched intonation, with Shashaa Tirupati joining in later with only having a few lines to sing. Tirupati's vocals serve as the chorus or refrain of the song, the song's tune changing as her lines continue the song with the same motivation but in a different tune. The song then ends on a bridge with additional vocals.

== Overview ==
The music video from the film features the protagonist Michael (Vijay) training the Tamil Nadu women's football team as well as motivating and encouraging them to break stereotypes and emerge as their true selves. The song also features Rahman and Atlee in special appearances alongside Vijay during the pre-chorus.

== Leaked ==
On 16 July 2019, a track from Bigil titled "Singa Penne" found its way to the internet and has gone viral on social media. It has been rumored to be leaked from the filmmakers.

== Reception ==
=== Critical reception ===
The Indian Express stated that "throughout the song's punchy six and a half minutes, lyricist Vivek with his catchy lyrics pays ode to the strength of women. The song as we can imagine will be used by Vijay's character in the film to motivate his all-girls football team while training them for probably a crucial match. If you were wondering, Singappenney is Tamil for lioness". Suhansid Srikanth of Moviecrow praised the song "Vivek's lyrics are endearing about motivating the team women that the lead character nourishes in the film. And, like most of ARR's recent tracks, it is tough to get into the catchy tune that can be hummed or identified as song" while praising Shashaa Tripathi's portion. Behindwoods called it a "highly powerful and energetic song composed of strong beats and tune, Singapenney is a song whose music stays true to the lyrics".

=== Social media reception ===
The motivational number has had a wide reach among the fans and has inspired fans to salute the Singappennu (lioness) in their lives.

Using the hashtag SaluteMySingappenney ("#SaluteMySingappenney"), people have taken to Twitter to post pictures of women they admire and are true heroes.

Archana Kalpathi, producer of Bigil, took to the social media platform to encourage followers to use the hashtag and post pictures of incredible women in their lives.

"A girl is often described as beautiful delicate fragile and kind hearted. We give u strength courage determination and the power to achieve anything she wants".

- Archana Kalpathi, Creative producer of film Bigil, wrote on her Twitter page.

=== YouTube records ===
The women anthem has garnered more than 2 million views within 2 hours of its release on YouTube.

The song became fastest music video to get 500k likes on YouTube and also .

== Music credits ==
Personnel

- Composer & Producer - A. R. Rahman
- Lyrics - Vivek
- Performers - A. R. Rahman, Shashaa Tirupati
- Kids Vocals - Riya K S, Nikhil P S, K R Arjun, Vidhya Rupini, K U Kokilapriya
- Additional Vocals - Arjun Chandy, Nakul Abhyankar, Veena Murali, Deepthi Suresh, Deepak, Soundarya, Niranjana, Swagatha, Sowmya, Aravind Srinivas, Jithin, Shenbagaraj

Musician Credits

- Guitars - Keba Jeremiah
- Flute - Kareem Kamalakar, Naveen Kumar
- Live Rhythm - T Raja, Drums Kumar, Krishna Kishore, P Guberan
- Tabla - Sai Saravanam
- Additional Rhythm Arrangement - Santhosh Dhayanidhi
- Additional Programming - Pawan CH, Hari Dafusia
- Choral Arrangement - Arjun Chandy, Nakul Abhyankar

Sound Engineers

- Panchathan Record Inn, Chennai - T. R. Krishna Chetan, Suresh Permal, Karthik Sekaran, Suryansh, Barath, Riyasdeen Riyan
- AM Studios Chennai - Sivakumar S, Kannan Ganpat, Pradeep Menon, Krishnan Subramaniyan, Manoj Raman, Aravind MS

Production

- Mixed By - T. R. Krishna Chetan, Jerry Vincent
- Mastered By - Suresh Permal
- MFiT - S. Sivakumar
- Musicians Co Ordinator - T. M. Faizuddin, Abdul Haiyum, Siddique
- Musicians Fixer - Samidurai R
- Music Label - Sony Music Entertainment India Pvt. Ltd.

== Video credits ==
Credits adapted from official music video released by Sony Music South.

- Director & Editor - Amith Krishnan
- Cinematographer - Vijay Kartik Kannan
- Stylist - Varshini
- Art Director - Saravanan
- Direction Team - Manojkumar, Ramanathan Sathyamoorthy, Vishal Ravichandran, Suriya Balakumuran
- Costume Designer - Pallavi Singh
- Make-up - Preetisheel Singh
- Assistant Cinematographers - Ilayaraja, Yuvaraj
- Camera Assistant - Vignesh R
- Still Photographer - Venket Ram
- Line Producer & Creative Head - Jagadish Palanisamy
- Executive Producer - S. M. Venckat Manickam

== Live performance ==
A. R. Rahman performed the song at a live concert held in YMCA, Nandanam, Chennai on 10 August 2019, among all the songs played at his concert.

On 27 September 2019, Rahman and his team performed "Singappenney" and all other songs at the Bigil audio launch event, held in Sai Leo Muthu Indoor Stadium, Sri Sairam Engineering College, Chennai where the audio was released.

== Chart ==
Weekly charts

Chart (2019–20)	Peak position	Reference(s)
Mirchi Top 20 Tamil	1	
WYNK Music Top 20 Tamil	1	
YouTube Trending	1	
Spotify Top Hits Tamil	1	
JioSaavn Weekly Top 15	1	

Year-end charts

Chart (2019)	Position	Reference(s)
BIG FM Radio	1	
Times of india	10	
Movie Crow	17	

== Accolades ==
Award	Date of ceremony	Category	Recipient(s) and nominee(s)	Result	Ref
Edison Award	TBA	Best PlayBack Singer Male for Singappenney	A.R. Rahman	Pending	
South Indian International Movie Awards	18 September 2021	Best PlayBack Singer Male for Singappenney	A.R. Rahman	Nominated	
BIG FM	N/A	N/A	N/A	Song Of The Year	
