= Vivek (lyricist) =

- Born: Vivek Velmurugan; 16 April 1985 (age 41); Chidambaram, Tamil Nadu, India
- Occupations: Lyricist, Writer
- Years active: 2015 – present
- Labels: Sony Music Entertainment, Divo, Think Music India, T-Series
- Spouse: Sharadha

Vivek Velmurugan, known by his stage name Vivek, is an Indian lyricist working on Tamil language films. After making his debut in Enakkul Oruvan (2015), he received critical acclaim for his work in 36 Vayadhinile (2015), Jil Jung Juk (2016), Mersal (2017), Sarkar (2018), Petta (2019), Bigil (2019), Jagame Thandhiram (2021), Varisu (2023) and Retro (2025). His songs "Aalaporan Thamizhan", "Marana Mass", "Verithanam", "Tum Tum", "Ranjithame", "Matta" and "Kanimaa" hit 100 million views on Youtube. Vivek has worked on over 200+ songs.

== Career ==
After studying civil engineering and then practising law, Vivek began writing poems after being inspired by the works of Vairamuthu. Vivek made his debut as lyricist through Enakkul Oruvan (2015), where he wrote two songs for the film's album, under the instructions of composer Santhosh Narayanan. The pair have subsequently collaborated in several projects including 36 Vayadhinile (2015), for which Vivek received a Best Lyricist nomination for at the 1st IIFA Utsavam, and in the sports drama film, Irudhi Suttru (2016). Vivek also garnered attention for his lyrics in "Shoot The Kuruvi", the promotional song from Siddharth's Jil Jung Juk (2016).

== Discography ==
Year	Film	Song	Composer	Note
2015	Enakkul Oruvan	Poo Avizhum Pozhudhil	Santhosh Narayanan	Best Lyrics Writer - 2nd Behindwoods Gold Medals 2015
2015	Enakkul Oruvan	Yaar En Manama	Santhosh Narayanan	Best Lyrics Writer - 2nd Behindwoods Gold Medals 2015
2015	36 Vayadhinile	Vaadi Raasathi	Santhosh Narayanan	Best Lyricist of the year - Mirchi Music Awards South 2015
2015	36 Vayadhinile	Pogiren	Santhosh Narayanan	
2015	36 Vayadhinile	Happy	Santhosh Narayanan	
2015	Indru Netru Naalai	Kadhale Kadhale	Hiphop Tamizha	
2015	Mathura Naranga	Kan Kangalil	Sreejith Saachin	
2015	Mathura Naranga	Neer Alaigalil	Sreejith Saachin	
2015	Mathura Naranga	Eee Kootil (Nee Vaanam)	Sreejith Saachin	
2016	Irudhi Suttru	Hey Sandakaara	Santhosh Narayanan	
2016	Irudhi Suttru	Vaangaji Warning	Santhosh Narayanan	
2016	Irudhi Suttru	Usuru Narambula	Santhosh Narayanan	
2016	Irudhi Suttru	Kaalathi Miratti	Santhosh Narayanan	
2016	Irudhi Suttru	Poda Poda	Santhosh Narayanan	
2016	Iraivi	Ghost Bottle	Santhosh Narayanan	
2016	Iraivi	Kalavara Kangal	Santhosh Narayanan	
2016	Iraivi	Manidhi	Santhosh Narayanan	
2016	Iraivi	Kaatril	Santhosh Narayanan	
2016	Iraivi	Thodaamal	Santhosh Narayanan	
2016	144	Kenatha Kaanam	Sean Roldan	
2016	144	Aagaa	Sean Roldan	
2016	Aranmanai 2	Maya Maya	Hiphop Tamizha	
2016	Jil Jung Juk	Shoot The Kuruvi	Vishal Chandrasekhar	
2016	Jil Jung Juk	Cassenova	Vishal Chandrasekhar	
2016	Jil Jung Juk	Domaru Lord	Vishal Chandrasekhar	
2016	Jil Jung Juk	Milano Kedi	Vishal Chandrasekhar	
2016	Unakkul Naan	Athiran Nadaiyil	Tony Britto	
2016	Ka Ka Ka: Aabathin Arikuri	Sila Sil Sila	Amrith	
2016	Oru Naal Koothu	Adiye Azhagu	Justin Prabhakaran	
2016	Maalai Nerathu Mayakkam	Ennodu Irupuram	Amrith	
2016	Manithan	Azhagazhaga	Santhosh Narayanan	
2016	Manithan	Poi Vazhva	Santhosh Narayanan	
2016	Manithan	Kaaychal	Santhosh Narayanan	
2016	Pokkiri Raja	Athuvitta Athuvitta	D. Imman	
2016	Pokkiri Raja	Bubbly Bubbly	D. Imman	
2016	Pokkiri Raja	Rain Rain	D. Imman	
2016	Pokkiri Raja	Athuvitta Remix	D. Imman	
2016	Kabali	Thalaivar Athiradi Rap	Santhosh Narayanan	
2016	Merku Thodarchi Malai	Merku Mak	Illayaraja	
2016	Kadhalum Kadandhu Pogum	Paravai Paranduchu	Santhosh Narayanan	
2016	Kadhalum Kadandhu Pogum	Bongu Kitchan	Santhosh Narayanan	
2016	Sei	Machaney	Nithin Lopez	
2016	Dhuruvangal Pathinaaru	Uthira Kaayangal	Jakes Bejoy	
2016	Meow	Oru Cute Littile Ponnu	Sreejith Edarana	
2016	Ulkuthu	Pesayum Esaya	Justin Prabhakaran	
2016	Remo	Meesa Beauty	Anirudh Ravichander	
2016	Aandavan Kattalai	Polambing	K	
2016	Aandavan Kattalai	Imsai Raani	K	
2016	Aandavan Kattalai	Vaazhkai Oru Ottagam	K	
2016	Kodi	Ei Suzhali	Santhosh Narayanan	
2016	Kodi	Sirukki Vaasam	Santhosh Narayanan	
2016	Kodi	Vettu Pottu	Santhosh Narayanan	
2016	Kodi	Ariraro	Santhosh Narayanan	
2016	Rum	Peiyophobilia	Anirudh Ravichander	
2016	Rum	Kadavulae Vidai	Anirudh Ravichander	
2016	Rum	Kadavulae Vidai (Reprise)	Anirudh Ravichander	
2016	Rum	Pori Pathi Vizhum	Anirudh Ravichander	
2016	Rum	Alladhe Siragiye	Anirudh Ravichander	
2017	Sathriyan	Sooda Oru Sooriyan	Yuvan Shankar Raja	
2017	Ivan Thanthiran	Ivan Ivan thanthiran	S. Thaman	
2017	Ivan Thanthiran	Medhakavitta Medhakavitta	S. Thaman	
2017	Mersal	Aalaporaan Thamizhan	A. R. Rahman	• Best Lyricist - 7th South Indian International Movie Awards 2018 • Best Lyrics Writer - 5th Behindwoods Gold Medal Awards 2018
2017	Mersal	Neethanae	A. R. Rahman	
2017	Mersal	Mersal Arasan	A. R. Rahman	
2017	Mersal	Maacho	A. R. Rahman	
2017	Mersal	Maayon	A. R. Rahman	
2017	Velaikkaran	Vaa Velikkara	Anirudh Ravichander	
2017	Meyaadha Maan	Thangachi Song	Santhosh Narayanan	
2017	Meyaadha Maan	Address Song	Santhosh Narayanan	
2017	Meyaadha Maan	Rathina Katti	Santhosh Narayanan	
2017	Meyaadha Maan	Megamo Aval	Santhosh Narayanan	
2017	Theeran Adhigaaram Ondru	Theeran Da	Ghibran	
2018	Sketch	Cheeni Chillaallee	S. Thaman	
2018	Sketch	Dhaadikaara	S. Thaman	
2018	Bhaagamathie	Mandhaara	S. Thaman	
2018	Sarkar	Simtaangaran	A. R. Rahman	
2018	Sarkar	Oruviral Puratchi	A. R. Rahman	
2018	Sarkar	OMG Ponnu	A. R. Rahman	
2018	Sarkar	CEO In The House	A. R. Rahman	
2018	Sarkar	TopTucker	A. R. Rahman	
2018	Irumbu Thirai	Azhagae	Yuvan Shankar Raja	
2018	Irumbu Thirai	Athiradi	Yuvan Shankar Raja	
2018	Irumbu Thirai	Mudhal Mazhai	Yuvan Shankar Raja	
2018	Kolamavu Kokila	Edhuvaraiyo	Anirudh Ravichander	
2018	Pyaar Prema Kaadhal	Hold Me Now	Yuvan Shankar Raja	
2018	60 Vayadu Maaniram	Naalum Naalum	Ilaiyaraaja	
2018	Pariyerum Perumal	Karuppi	Santhosh Narayanan	
2018	Pariyerum Perumal	Potta Kaatil Poovasam	Santhosh Narayanan	
2018	Pariyerum Perumal	Vaa Rayil Vida Polaama	Santhosh Narayanan	
2018	Kaali	Arumbey Arumbey	Vijay Antony	
2018	Vada Chennai	Ennadi Maayavi Nee	Santhosh Narayanan	
2018	Vada Chennai	Kaarkuzhal Kadavaiye	Santhosh Narayanan	
2019	Petta	Marana Mass	Anirudh Ravichander	
2019	Petta	Ullaallaa	Anirudh Ravichander	
2019	Petta	Petta Paraak	Anirudh Ravichander	
2019	Dev	Dai Machan Dev	Harris Jayaraj	
2019	Boomerang	Mughaiyazhi	Radhan	
2019	Boomerang	Desame	Radhan	
2019	Boomerang	Mughaiyazhi (Instrumental Version)	Radhan	
2019	Devarattam	Pasampukalli	Nivas K. Prasanna	
2019	Devarattam	Lesa Lesa	Nivas K. Prasanna	
2019	Oththa Seruppu Size 7	Kulirudha Pulla	Santhosh Narayanan	
2019	Jackpot	Shero Shero	Vishal Chandrasekhar	
2019	Ayogya	Kanne Kanne	Sam C.S.	
2019	Sindhubaadh	Nenja Unakaga	Yuvan Shankar Raja	
2019	Bigil	Singappenney	A. R. Rahman	Best Lyrics Writer - South Indian International Movie Awards 2021
2019	Bigil	Verithanam	A. R. Rahman	
2019	Bigil	Unakaga	A. R. Rahman	
2019	Bigil	Maathare	A. R. Rahman	
2019	Bigil	Kaalame	A. R. Rahman	
2019	Bigil	Idhurkuthaan	A. R. Rahman	
2019	Frozen 2 (Tamil)	Vaadai Serum	Robert Lopez; Kristen Anderson-Lopez	
2019	Frozen 2 (Tamil)	Siladhu	Robert Lopez; Kristen Anderson-Lopez	
2019	Frozen 2 (Tamil)	Izhukkum Maayoll	Robert Lopez; Kristen Anderson-Lopez	
2019	Frozen 2 (Tamil)	Nadu Kattukkul Naan	Robert Lopez; Kristen Anderson-Lopez	
2019	Frozen 2 (Tamil)	Thondru Nee	Robert Lopez; Kristen Anderson-Lopez	
2019	Frozen 2 (Tamil)	Naatkal Oda	Robert Lopez; Kristen Anderson-Lopez	
2019	Frozen 2 (Tamil)	Seiven Sariyanathai	Robert Lopez; Kristen Anderson-Lopez	
2019	Adithya Varma	Yaarumillaa	Radhan	
2019	Thambi	Thalattu Naal	Govind Vasantha	
2020	Darbar	Chumma Kizhi	Anirudh Ravichander	
2020	Darbar	Tharam Maara Single	Anirudh Ravichander	
2020	Darbar	Dumm Dumm	Anirudh Ravichander	
2020	Pattas	Morattu Tamizhan	Vivek-Mervin	
2020	Pattas	Jigidi Killadi	Vivek-Mervin	
2020	Soorarai Pottru	Veyyon Silli	G. V. Prakash Kumar	
2020	Ponmagal Vandhal	Vaa Chellam	Govind Vasantha	
2020	Ponmagal Vandhal	Pookalin Porvai	Govind Vasantha	
2020	Penguin	Kolame	Santhosh Narayanan	
2020	Penguin	Omale (Malayalam)	Santhosh Narayanan	
2020	Jagame Thandhiram	Rakita Rakita Rakita	Santhosh Narayanan	
2020	Jagame Thandhiram	Bujji	Santhosh Narayanan	
2020	Jagame Thandhiram	Aala Ola	Santhosh Narayanan	
2020	99 Songs	Oor Aayiram Vaanavil	A. R. Rahman	
2020	99 Songs	Naalai Naalai	A. R. Rahman	
2020	Vasantha Mullai	Avalo Avalo	Rajesh Murugesan	
2020	Sabhaapathy	Mayakkathe Maya Kanna	Sam C.S.	
2021	Annabelle Sethupathi	Anange	Krishna Kishore	
2021	Annabelle Sethupathi	Anange(Reprise)	Krishna Kishore	
2021	Oh Manapenne!	Bodhai Kaname	Vishal Chandrashekhar	
2021	Enemy	Tum Tum	S. Thaman	
2021	Galatta Kalyanam	Sooraavali Ponnu	A. R. Rahman	
2021	Anbarivu	Arakkiyae	Hiphop Tamizha	
2022	Naai Sekar	Lol Lol Arasan	Ajesh	
2022	Maaran	Polladha Ulagam	G. V. Prakash Kumar	Also Screenplay writer
2022	Maaran	Annana Thaalaattum	G. V. Prakash Kumar	Also Screenplay writer
2022	Mahaan	Evanda Enakku Custody	Santhosh Narayanan	
2022	Mahaan	Missing Me	Santhosh Narayanan	
2022	Mahaan	Naan Naan	Santhosh Narayanan	
2022	Mahaan	Umm Song	Santhosh Narayanan	
2022	Veeramae Vaagai Soodum	Thithikkirathe Kangal	Yuvan Shankar Raja	
2022	Beast	Beast Mode	Anirudh Ravichander	
2022	Ranga	Mathapoo	Ramjeevan	
2022	Ayngaran	Thithipa	G. V. Prakash Kumar	
2022	Andhagan	En Kadhal	Santhosh Narayanan	
2022	Andhagan	Yosichi Yosichi	Santhosh Narayanan	
2022	Don	Unnai Vidaadhe	Anirudh Ravichander	
2022	Don	Mudhal Naayagan	Anirudh Ravichander	
2022	Bestie	Unnai Pola	J. V.	
2022	Anel Meley Pani Thuli	Mittai Mittai	Santhosh Narayanan	
2022	Paper Rocket	Kaalai Maalai	Dharan Kumar	
2022	Gulu Gulu	Anbarey	Santhosh Narayanan	
2022	Thiruchitrambalam	Life of Pazham	Anirudh Ravichander	
2022	Paramporul	Sippara Rippara	Yuvan Shankar Raja	
2022	Cobra	Thumbi Thullal	A R Rahman	
2022	Prince	Bimbiliki Pilaapi	Thaman S	
2022	Singappenney	Ezhundhu Vaa	Kumaran Sivamani	
2022	Naane Varuvean	Yaarum Illa	Yuvan Shankar Raja	
2022	Naai Sekar Returns	Panakkaran	Santhosh Narayanan	
2022	Gatta Kusthi	Chal Chakka	Justin Prabhakaran	
2022	Gatta Kusthi	Sanda Veerachi	Justin Prabhakaran	• Best Lyricist - 14th Ananda Vikatan Cinema Awards 2022
2022	Gatta Kusthi	Medha Medhappa	Justin Prabhakaran	
2022	Varisu	Ranjithame	Thaman S	Also Dialogues, Additional Screenplay
2022	Varisu	Thee Thalapathy	Thaman S	Also Dialogues, Additional Screenplay
2022	Varisu	Soul Of Varisu	Thaman S	Also Dialogues, Additional Screenplay
2022	Varisu	Jimikki Ponnu	Thaman S	Also Dialogues, Additional Screenplay
2022	Varisu	Vaa Thalaivaa	Thaman S	Also Dialogues, Additional Screenplay
2023	Kick	Pathu Murai	Arjun Janya	
2023	Dasara	Dhoom Dhaam Dhosthu	Santhosh Narayanan	
2023	Dasara	Theekari	Santhosh Narayanan	
2023	Theerkadarishi	Miss You	G. Balasubramanian	
2023	Agilan	Dhrogam	Sam CS	
2023	Pathu Thala	Namma Satham	A. R. Rahman	
2023	Pathu Thala	Nee Singamdhan	A. R. Rahman	
2023	Veeran	Thunderkaaran	Hiphop Tamizha	
2023	Regina	Naam Ulaavum Oadai	Sathish Nair	
2023	Jawan (Tamil)	Vandha Edam	Anirudh Ravichander	
2023	Jawan (Tamil)	Hayyoda	Anirudh Ravichander	
2023	Jawan (Tamil)	Not Ramaiya Vastavaiya	Anirudh Ravichander	
2023	Jawan (Tamil)	Aararaari Raaro	Anirudh Ravichander	
2023	Jawan (Tamil)	Pattasa	Anirudh Ravichander	
2023	Iraivan	Azhagai	Yuvan Shankar Raja	
2023	Iraivan	Idhu Pola	Yuvan Shankar Raja	
2023	Iraivan	Shades of Love	Yuvan Shankar Raja	
2023	Iraivan	Nanbha	Yuvan Shankar Raja	
2023	Iraivan	Fear Beat	Yuvan Shankar Raja	
2023	Chithha	Unakku Thaan	Santhosh Narayanan	
2023	Chandramukhi 2	Moruniye	M. M. Keeravani	
2023	Miss Shetty Mr Polishetty (Tamil)	No No No	Radhan	
2023	Miss Shetty Mr Polishetty (Tamil)	Lady Luck	Radhan	
2023	Miss Shetty Mr Polishetty (Tamil)	Aaradho	Radhan	
2023	Miss Shetty Mr Polishetty (Tamil)	Yaadho Dhisai	Radhan	
2023	Jigarthanda DoubleX	Maamadura	Santhosh Narayanan	
2023	Jigarthanda DoubleX	Oyyaram	Santhosh Narayanan	
2023	Annapoorani: The Goddess of Food	Ulagai Vella Pogiraal	Thaman S	
2023	Annapoorani: The Goddess of Food	Life Is On (Version 1 - Veg)	Thaman S	
2023	Annapoorani: The Goddess of Food	Life Is On (Version 2 - Non-Veg)	Thaman S	
2023	Annapoorani: The Goddess of Food	Ivalo Ivalo	Thaman S	
2023	Annapoorani: The Goddess of Food	Aduppil Pogai Aagum	Thaman S	
2023	Lal Salaam	Ther Thiruvizha	A. R. Rahman	
2023	Saindhav (Tamil)	Vennaa Penne	Santhosh Narayanan	
2023	Saindhav (Tamil)	Poraname	Santhosh Narayanan	
2023	Hi Nanna (Tamil)	Amizhdhe Nee	Hesham Abdul Wahab	
2023	Hi Nanna (Tamil)	Odiyamma	Hesham Abdul Wahab	
2023	Hi Nanna (Tamil)	Nee Maaya Nizhal	Hesham Abdul Wahab	
2023	Hi Nanna (Tamil)	Vaazhvin Doorame	Hesham Abdul Wahab	
2024	Captain Miller	Kombari Vettapuli	G. V. Prakash Kumar	
2024	Ayalaan	Vera Level Sago	A. R. Rahman	
2024	Ayalaan	Ayalaa Ayalaa	A. R. Rahman	
2024	Joshua: Imai Pol Kaakha	Tappasu Neram	Karthik	
2024	Ranam Aram Thavarel	Achu Pennae	Arrol Corelli	
2024	The Family star (Tamil)	Nandanadana	Gopi Sundar	
2024	The Family star (Tamil)	Kalyaanam Satham Satham	Gopi Sundar	
2024	J Baby	Idha Thane Ethir Paathen	Santhosh Narayanan	
2024	J Baby	Yaar Padalai	Santhosh Narayanan	
2024	J Baby	Idha Thane (Reprise)	Santhosh Narayanan	
2024	Kalki 2898 AD (Tamil)	Bhairava Anthem	Santhosh Narayanan	
2024	Kalki 2898 AD (Tamil)	Theme of Kalki	Santhosh Narayanan	
2024	Kalki 2898 AD (Tamil)	Hope of Shambala	Santhosh Narayanan	
2024	Kalki 2898 AD (Tamil)	Ta Takkara (Complex Song)	Santhosh Narayanan	
2024	Kalki 2898 AD (Tamil)	Keshava Madhava (Wait of Ashwatthama)	Santhosh Narayanan	
2024	EMI	Poonaikku	Srinath Pitchai	
2024	Vaazhai	Otha Satti Soru	Santhosh Narayanan	
2024	The Greatest of All Time	Matta	Yuvan Shankar Raja	
2024	Game Changer (Tamil)	Jaragandi	Thaman S	Also Tamil dialogues and screenplay along with S. Shankar
2024	Game Changer (Tamil)	Raa Macha Macha	Thaman S	Also Tamil dialogues and screenplay along with S. Shankar
2024	Amaran	Uyirey	G. V. Prakash Kumar	
2024	Bloody Beggar	Ponmayame	Jen Martin	Co-wrote lyrics with Vishnu Edavan
2024	Kadhalikka Neramillai	Yennai Izhukkuthadi	A. R. Rahman	
2025	Nilavuku En Mel Ennadi Kobam	Yedi	G.V. Prakash Kumar	
2025	Veera Dheera Sooran	Kalloorum	G.V. Prakash Kumar	
2025	Veera Dheera Sooran	Aaathi Adi Aaathi	G.V. Prakash Kumar	
2025	Veera Dheera Sooran	Ayla Allela	G.V. Prakash Kumar	
2025	Retro	Kannadi Poove	Santhosh Narayanan	
2025	Retro	Kanimaa	Santhosh Narayanan	
2025	Retro	The One	Santhosh Narayanan	
2025	Retro	Edharkaga Marubadi	Santhosh Narayanan	
2025	Maaman	All songs except "Vizhuthe Thalavizhuthe"	Hesham Abdul Wahab	
2025	3BHK	Kaanalin Mele	Amrit Ramnath	
2025	Thanal	Kitta Nerungadha	Justin Prabhakaran	
2025	Dude	Nallaru Po	Sai Abhyankkar	
2025	Mark	Masth Malaika	B. Ajaneesh Loknath	Tamil version
2026	Karuppu	Raathu Raasan	Sai Abhyankkar	
2026	Jana Nayagan	Oru Pere Varalaaru	Anirudh Ravichander	
2026	Jana Nayagan	Chella Magale	Anirudh Ravichander	
2026	Jana Nayagan	Raavana Mavandaa	Anirudh Ravichander	
2026	Peddi	Chikiri Chikiri	A. R. Rahman	Tamil version
2026	Peddi	Rai Rai Raa Raa	A. R. Rahman	Tamil version
2026	Peddi	Massa Massa	A. R. Rahman	Tamil version
2026	Blast	"Alpha"	Ravi Basrur	
2026	Idhayam Murali	All songs except "Vaama Vaama"	Thaman S	
2026	Jailer 2	"Shaitaan"	Tamil lyrics only; Hindi lyrics written by Super Subu	

=== Music video ===
Year	Track	Artist(s)	Notes	Ref
2024	Flag Anthem (Ideology Song)	Arivu		
2025	Sithira Puthiri	Sai Abhyankkar		
2026	TVK Election Campaign Song	Thaman S	Singers: C. Joseph Vijay, VM Mahalingam	
2026	Pavazha Malli	Sai Abhyankkar	Co-singer Shruti Haasan	
2026	Radhimaa	Sai Abhyankkar		
