= Sarkar (2018 film) =

2018 Indian film by A. R. Murugadoss

- Theatrical release poster
- Directed by: A. R. Murugadoss
- Screenplay by: A. R. Murugadoss
- Dialogue by: A. R. Murugadoss; B. Jeyamohan
- Story by: A. R. Murugadoss; Varun Rajendran
- Produced by: Kalanithi Maran
- Starring: Vijay; Keerthy Suresh; Varalaxmi Sarathkumar; Radha Ravi
- Cinematography: Girish Gangadharan
- Edited by: A. Sreekar Prasad
- Music by: Songs: A. R. Rahman; Score: A. R. Rahman; Qutub-E-Kripa
- Production company: Sun Pictures
- Distributed by: Sun Pictures
- Release date: 6 November 2018
- Running time: 164 minutes
- Country: India
- Language: Tamil
- Budget: ₹110 crore
- Box office: est.₹253 crore (Note: Sarkar's reported worldwide gross is ₹253 crore according to India Today and The Indian Express.)

Sarkar (transl. Government) is a 2018 Indian Tamil-language political action film directed by A. R. Murugadoss, who co-wrote the dialogues with B. Jeyamohan, and produced by Kalanithi Maran's Sun Pictures. The film stars Vijay, Keerthy Suresh and Varalaxmi Sarathkumar in the lead roles, alongside Yogi Babu, Tulasi, Radha Ravi and Pala. Karuppiah. In the film, a corporate raider arrives in Tamil Nadu from the United States to cast his vote in the Tamil Nadu Legislative Assembly election, only to find out that his vote has already been recorded as cast. This leads to him raising awareness against electoral fraud and contesting as a non-partisan politician in the elections amidst several attempts made on his life and reputation.

Principal photography for the film began in January 2018. Murugadoss collaborated with Vijay for the third time with Sarkar, which was the latter's 62nd film and given the tentative title of Thalapathy 62. In early December 2017, Sun Pictures agreed to produce the film. While Girish Gangadharan handled the cinematography, A. Sreekar Prasad served as the editor. In August, a few scenes were shot at Las Vegas. Filming was completed by September 2018. The film's soundtrack was composed by A. R. Rahman with lyrics written by Vivek.

After various complications, including protests and allegations of plagiarism, Sarkar was released on 6 November 2018 on the week of Diwali and received mixed to positive reviews from critics. Post-release, the film involved in controversies with reference to J. Jayalalithaa in the audio track and other sequences from the film led to protests by members of the All India Anna Dravida Munnetra Kazhagam (AIADMK). After lawsuits were registered against the makers, they said the allusions were muted. Sarkar grossed ₹253 crore worldwide in its entire run and emerged as a commercial success but it suffered financial losses in specific regions.

Sarkar became Vijay's third film to collect $1 million at the US box office, following Theri and Mersal. As a result of the film's success, the Election Commission of India created awareness regarding Section 49P of the Conduct of Elections Rules, 1961 that allows a voter to have the right to get back his/her ballot back and vote if someone else voted in that individual's name. Sarkar was screened at Grand Rex, France and was also screened in Japan.

== Plot ==
Sundar Ramasamy is a wealthy and ruthless NRI corporate raider in the United States, referred to as a corporate monster due to his ruthless business dealings. His imminent arrival in Chennai scares companies since they think they are a target for him. But he has come to vote in the Tamil Nadu Legislative Assembly election. However, at the polling station he learns that someone else has already voted in his place.

Sundar approaches the Tamil Nadu State Election Commission and demands a stay on the election result for his constituency, an annulment of the fraud elector's vote, and the ability to cast his vote legitimately. They agree with his opinion. He raises awareness among the public regarding fraudulent voting and finds that many people face a similar problem while trying to vote. M. Masilamani, the previous CM of Tamil Nadu, is re-elected, his daughter Komalavalli, and fellow politician and brother Malarvannan "Rendu" celebrate.

Sundar visits his family rekindling with Nila, his brother's estranged sister-in-law. Meanwhile, Masilamani receives suitcases full of black money as he discovers a journalist, Muthukumar, hiding inside the luggage to record evidence of his corruption. Masilamani kills him and buries the case. Sundar's actions bring him into conflict with Masilamani and Rendu. Although Masilamani's party won the elections, the Election Commission annulled the result based on Sundar's plea to recount the votes, and the court decided to schedule fresh elections within 15 days.

After many assassination attempts on him by Rendu's henchmen, Sundar decides to contest the election against Masilamani as an Independent candidate and resigns from his company to avoid any conflict of interest. Initially unpopular among the masses due to his corporate background, Sundar delivers a speech detailing his rise from a humble fisherman upbringing to a business magnate and his struggle from poverty to riches, gaining massive support. Sundar and his supporters gatecrash an event involving the merger of Masilamani's party with the opposition. After Sundar confronts Masilamani regarding his silence on district-related issues, the police brutally beat up Sundar and his supporters.

At this juncture, Sundar realises that the entire political system in the state and country needs reform, so he decides to contest in all constituencies in Tamil Nadu along with his supporters. Sundar acquires video evidence wherein people who had attempted to expose Masilamani's corruption died under mysterious circumstances, and he plans to reveal it to the media to discredit Masilamani and have him arrested. Meanwhile, Masilamani's daughter Komalavalli, based in Canada arrives in Chennai after discovering that her father and uncle have lost support due to Sundar. She decides to spoil Sundar's reputation and frame him as a corrupt and power-hungry person. Komalavalli orchestrates a car accident, planting a case of money stolen by a mysterious person. She blames Sundar for the accident, which causes him to lose considerable public support. Komalavalli furthers her agenda by killing her father with an overdose of diabetic tablets so that her party will gain sympathy votes. These crimes ensure that Komalavalli, the new Chief Ministerial candidate for her party, would likely win the election. On Election Day, Twitter messages generated from Muthukumar allege that Sundar has stashed black money in various locations, which further degrades Sundar's reputation. However, unknown to anyone, the tweets were sent by Sundar himself, as Muthukumar was one of those activists killed by Masilamani. Further messages lead to the discovery of Muthukumar's decomposed body, exposing Komalavalli's lies.

Meanwhile, Komalavalli finds out that her mother has decided to expose her role in Masilamani's death at the latter's memorial in front of the media later in the day. She arrives at the monument with her henchmen to stop the expose, but Sundar subdues her henchmen, and her mother's confession is live-streamed, which ensures that the public support is back with Sundar. Sundar and his supporters win the election, while the police arrest Komalavalli and Rendu for various crimes. However, Sundar decides against becoming the Chief Minister and instead chooses one of his supporters, an honest collector, to be the next Chief Minister.

== Cast ==
- Vijay as Sundar Ramasamy, a corporate raider-turned-politician
- Keerthy Suresh as Nila, Sundar's love interest
- Varalaxmi Sarathkumar as Komalavalli "Pappa", a politician
- Radha Ravi as Malarvannan "Rendu", Pappa's paternal uncle
- Pala. Karuppiah as M. Masilamani, Pappa's father, the former Chief Minister of Tamil Nadu
- Yogi Babu as Kaushik, a fraudulent voter
- Rajesh as T. N. Chari, the Election Commissioner
- Livingston as Venkatesan, Nila's father
- Tulasi as Masilamani's wife
- Kalyani Natarajan as Sundar's mother
- Prem as Sundar's brother
- Ranjini Hariharan as Sundar's sister
- Yuvina Parthavi as Sundar's niece
- Arumugam Bala as Sundar's driver
- M. J. Shriram as Sundar's uncle
- Janaki as Sundar's grandmother
- Jayaditya Kang as Sundar's nephew
- Kanishk as Sundar's nephew
- Manya as Sundar's niece
- K. Sivasankar as Election Officer
- S. S. Stanley as Merged Party Candidate
- Ashwanth Thilak as Reporter
- Raneesh as 'Saattai' Muthukumar, an activist who was killed by Masilamani
- Apollo Ravi as Rathnasamy
- Meenu as Victim
- Alok Nath as Jethmalani
- ECR Saravanan as Ayodhyakuppam Resident
- Selva as Ayodhyakuppam Resident
- Balasubramani as Police Commissioner
- Lallu as IIT student
- Vicky Waran as IIT student
- Jashwanth Kannan as IIT student
- Karthik Nag as IIT student
- Elyssa Erhardt as Sundar's PA
- Raja Rani Pandian as Voting Poll Worker
- Pasupathi Raj as Voting Poll Worker
- Vinod as Governor's PA
- Ajit Koshy as Company Manager
- Vetrivel Raja as Man in bar
- Sujatha Babu Ramesh as Sun TV Newsreader
- Anita Sampath as Sun TV Newsreader
- Master Jagannath as Bystander during fire incident
- A. R. Murugadoss in a special appearance as common man in "Oru Viral Puratchi" song
- Simran Gupta in a special appearance as dancer in "Simtaangaran" song
- Papri Ghosh as Sundar's sister-in-law (photo appearance)

Real-life activists such as Kalki Subramaniam, Piyush Manush and Fatima Babu made cameo appearances as themselves in the song "Oru Viral Puratchi".

== Production ==
=== Development ===
Following the successful ventures, Thuppakki and Kaththi, AR Murugadoss was confirmed to be the director of the 62nd film of actor Vijay. The project, tentatively titled Thalapathy 62 (the working title as it is the 62nd film starring Vijay, who is known as Thalapathy among fans), was slated to enter production once Vijay completed Mersal and Murugadoss completed Spyder. In early-December 2017, T. Santhanam was confirmed as the art director of the film, and following this, it was made official that Sun Pictures was producing the film. Girish Gangadharan was chosen in as the cinematographer. A. Sreekar Prasad, who had previously edited Thuppakki and Kaththi, was the film's editor. B. Jeyamohan was recruited as writer. The title Sarkar was revealed on 21 June 2018, ahead of Vijay's birthday.

=== Casting ===
In mid-November 2017, it was reported that actor Yogi Babu was in talks to play a role in the film, and actress Nayanthara was in talks to be the female lead. Jaswanth Khanna, son of comedian Ramesh Khanna, who had worked as an assistant director, made his acting debut with this film. Keerthy Suresh was later signed to play the female lead role, marking her second collaboration with Vijay after Bairavaa (2017). Varalaxmi Sarathkumar was also confirmed, playing a pivotal role.

=== Filming ===
Principal photography began in January 2018. The team had successfully completed the first and second schedules of the shoot, and they began their third schedule in Las Vegas in early August. Shooting wrapped in early September.

== Music ==
The music and score of the film are composed by A. R. Rahman with lyricist Vivek penning the songs. The full audio album was launched on 2 October 2018 at Sai Leo Muthu Auditorium, Sri Sai Ram Engineering College, Chennai. The album consists of five songs, all penned by lyricist Vivek. The team launched the very first single, "Simtaangaran", which received mixed reviews, on 24 September, followed by "Oru Viral Puratchi" on the last day of the same month of September, which too received positive reviews. The album in its entirety was made available for download in digital on 2 October. The promotional music event featured dance performances for the songs in the background. The soundtrack album was released and bagged under the Sony Music record label. After a few days, the single track was released.

Sarkar is Rahman's fourth collaboration with actor Vijay, after Udhaya, Azhagiya Tamil Magan, and Mersal. The audio release event of the film was conducted in a much peculiar way, where for the very first time, the audience were given the privilege of launching the music album online by the means of the production company's website. The audio launch event held a live telecast aired on Sun TV, and on their exclusive paid service called SunNXT. Studioflicks mentioned "A mix of local and western flavour from A. R. Rahman", giving it a rating of 3.25 out of 5. Behindwoods gave it 2.75 out of 5 stars and stated: "A. R. Rahman goes full-on techno for Sarkar ".

== Marketing and release ==
The film's teaser was released on 19 October 2018 and gained one million views within one hour of its release and "broken several records and turned out to be the fastest promo video to touch the one million mark".

Sarkar was released on 6 November 2018, during the week of Diwali. The film released in an unprecedented way for a Tamil film by releasing on a Tuesday. The film opened in 3,400 screens worldwide. Additionally, the film released to the Tamil speaking Indian Diaspora in 80 countries with 1,200 international screens. The film's overseas distributors have ensured that the film releases in as many as new markets such as Poland, Mexico, Philippines, New Zealand, Ukraine, Russia, and several countries in the African continent. The Kerala fans of the actor erected a 175 feet tall cut-out of the actor, the tallest cut-out for a film actor in Kollam. After its theatrical premiere, the film was made available for streaming on Sun NXT and Netflix.

Sarkar Infinite, an action mobile video game was released as a tie-in for the film and was developed by Arkcon Arts.

== Box office ==
The film released on Diwali, and according to the trade trackers, it earned across ₹30 crore in Tamil Nadu on its opening day, beating Baahubali 2. Sarkar has broken several collection records, including the one held by Sanju for overall collections and joined the 100 Crore Club within two days. Sarkar earnings in France was more than 20,000 admissions as of 15 November 2018. In Malaysia, the film earned US$1,793,542 (₹13.03 crore) from the six-day opening weekend. The film grossed ₹2.37 crores in Chennai on the first day and ₹2.32 crores on the second day. The film grossed ₹253 crore worldwide.

Despite a strong opening and high worldwide gross, Sarkar received a mixed box-office verdict in certain territories. According to trade reports, some distributors did not fully recover their investment, particularly in Tamil Nadu and overseas markets. The reports mentioned that distributors recovered only about 90% of their investment in some regions, resulting in financial losses in some territories of about ₹10 crores.

== Reception ==
Sarkar received mixed to positive reviews from critics with praise for Vijay's performance, storyline, technical aspects, action sequences, background score, soundtrack and social message, but criticised its screenwriting.

Anusha Iyengar of Times Now gave 3.5 out of 5 stars and wrote "Vijay's performance is far better and mature than any of his other performances. Jeyamohan, the writer of the film, deserves all the credit here for writing dialogues that only Vijay can pull off with that kind of impact and power." Sakshi Post gave 3.5 out of 5 stars and wrote "Sarkar has all the makings of a commercial thriller. You will see Vijay's signature dialogues which are whistle worthy and scenes with Murugadoss trademark. The film contains all the ingredients of a masala entertainer and keeps you engaged through the movie."

Sanjith Sidhardhan of The Times of India gave 3 out of 5 stars and wrote "The underlying message, strong performance by Vijay and also nods to several real-life incidents and people make Sarkar a smart and yet a bit stretched out." Gauthaman Bhaskaran of News18 gave 1.5 out of 5 stars and wrote "While Sarkar cannot be faulted in direction or mounting with some great action sequences, the plot has been written only for Vijay. There is really no place for a second character." Ananda Vikatan rated the film 40 out of 100.

== Political controversies ==
Following release, the Government of Tamil Nadu accused the filmmakers and Vijay of inciting the people by targeting the ruling government in some scenes and defaming former chief minister J. Jayalalithaa by naming the main antagonist with her alleged original name Komalavalli. (Note: T. T. V. Dhinakaran stated that "Komalavalli (the character's name) is not Amma's name at all. In 2002-03 when a Congressman referred to her by this name, Amma herself said this was not her name and that she had not even done any such film role," in the context of a controversy over of the use of the name in the Tamil film Sarkar. Jayalalithaa objected to the use of the name Komalavalli in a biography and obtained a stay. Her niece Deepa Jayakumar also denied that Komalavalli was Jayalalithaa's birth name.) This led to numerous protests by AIADMK party cadre at theatres, where the film was screened, and vandalism of the banners of Vijay. AIADMK accused Sun Pictures, which is owned by Kalanithi Maran, who is the grand nephew of former Chief Minister Karunanidhi of DMK of targeting the government.

Several actors such as Rajinikanth and Kamal Haasan supported the filmmakers by raising the voice against the oppression of freedom of speech. They cited that a film must not be scrutinised even after the censor of the film by the Censor Board. Following the threat of lawsuits from the government, the filmmakers accepted to cut the scenes and mute references of Komalavalli in the audio track.

=== Political context ===
Vijay’s film Sarkar (2018), which portrayed criticism of government welfare schemes, had previously generated political controversy and debate in Tamil Nadu.

In 2026, Vijay’s political manifesto, which included welfare measures such as free LPG cylinders and financial assistance, drew attention amid broader discussions on “freebie” politics in the state.

== Plagiarism allegations ==
In October 2018, writer Varun Rajendran accused Murugadoss of plagiarising Sengol, a story that he had registered with the South Indian Film Writers Association in 2007. After K. Bhagyaraj, the head of the Association, concluded that Sarkar's script was not original, the matter was taken to court, where the judge directed both the parties to come up with an agreement for the scheduled release of the film. In the resulting agreement, the director admitted that the story of Sarkar was the same as of Sengol and that Sun Pictures agreed to thank Varun Rajendran and flash a message card for 30 seconds after the thank you note in the title card and also pay him ₹30 lakh (US$32,000) as compensation.

== Awards and nominations ==
| Date of ceremony | Award | Category | Recipient(s) and nominee(s) | Result | Ref. |
|---|---|---|---|---|---|
| 16 December 2018 | Behindwoods Gold Medal | Best Actor in Negative role — Female | Varalaxmi Sarathkumar | Won | |
| 5 January 2019 | Ananda Vikatan Cinema Awards | Best Villain — Female | Varalaxmi Sarathkumar | Won | |

== Impact ==
After the success of the film, the Election Commission of India created awareness regarding Section 49P of the Conduct of Elections Rules, 1961 that allows a voter to have the right to get back his/her ballot back and vote if someone else voted in that individual's name.

== In popular culture ==
The Telugu film Officer was dubbed and released in Tamil as Simtangaran named after the song from the film.
