= Panchathan Record Inn and AM Studios =

Music recording studio in Chennai, India

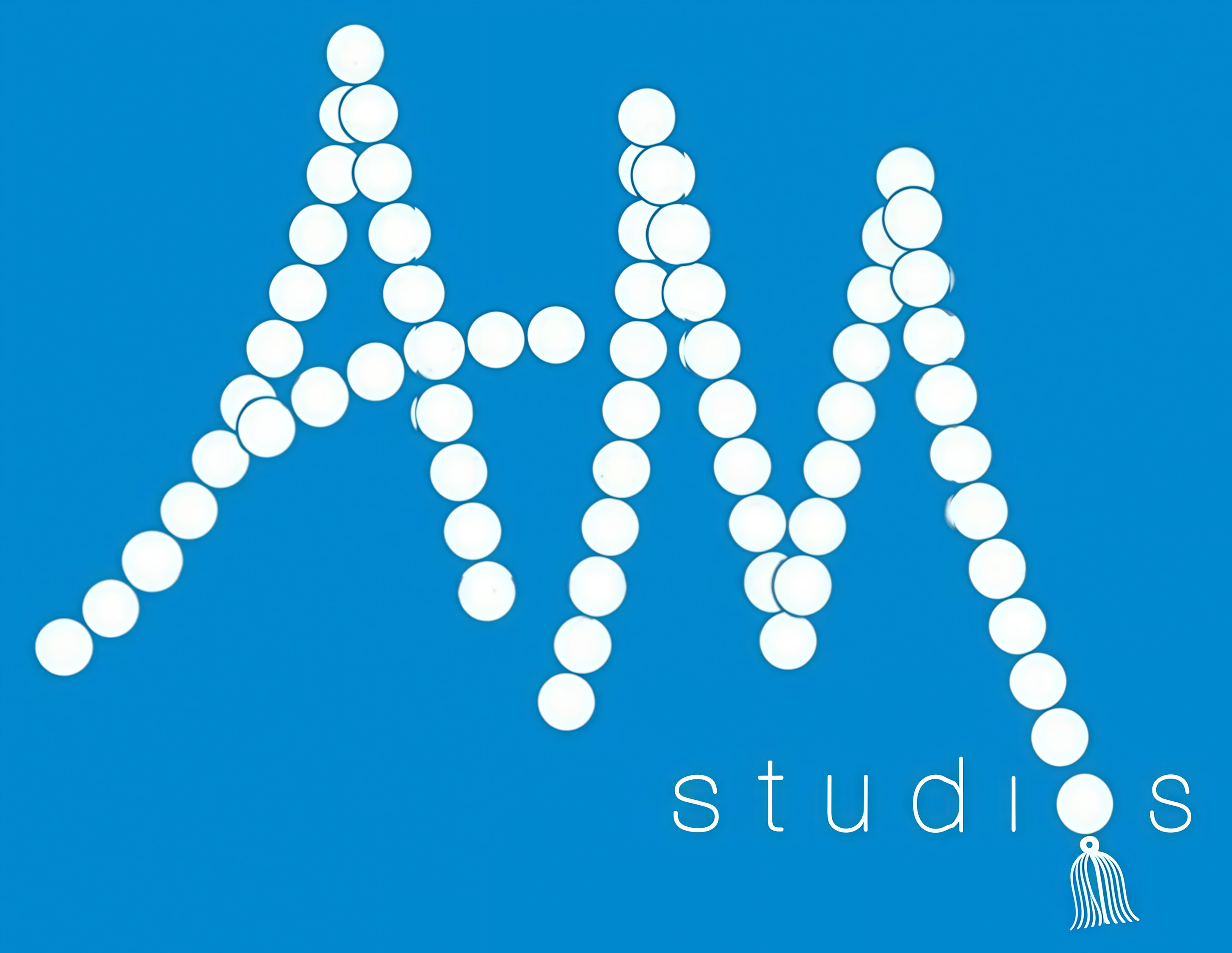
- Trade name: AM Studios
- Type: Recording studio
- Industry: Music
- Founded: 1989
- Founder: A. R. Rahman
- Headquarters: Kodambakkam, Chennai, Tamil Nadu, India
- Website: amstudios.in

Panchathan Record Inn and AM Studios (d/b/a AM Studios) is a recording and audio post-production studio complex founded by A. R. Rahman, used as his personal office and facility for audio mixing and film scoring. Panchathan Record Inn, established as a private creative workspace, was significantly expanded in 2006 with the launch of AM Studios.

Established initially as a backyard studio, the complex has expanded into one of the most technologically advanced audio post-production facilities in Asia.

== Panchathan Record Inn (1989) ==
The studio was founded in 1989 under the name Panchathan Record Inn in the backyard of A. R. Rahman residence in Kodambakkam, Chennai. At the time, Rahman—then working under his birth name A. S. Dileep Kumar—used the modest setup primarily for composing commercial jingles and television music for advertisement.

In 1991, film director Mani Ratnam visited the studio and commissioned Rahman to score his upcoming Tamil film Roja (1992). The soundtrack achieved massive commercial and critical success, winning Rahman the National Film Award for Best Music Direction and establishing Panchathan Record Inn as a key hub for modern Indian film scoring. Throughout the 1990s and early 2000s, iconic soundtracks including Bombay (1995), Dil Se.. (1998), and the Oscar-nominated Lagaan (2001) were recorded and produced at the facility.

== AM Studios (2006) ==
To accommodate larger orchestra, live choir, theatre music recordings, multi-channel surround sound and audio mixing. A. R. Rahman expanded the facility in 2006 by launching AM Studios.

Designed with international acoustic engineering standards, AM Studios was built to compete with top scoring stages globally, featuring state-of-the-art isolation booths, custom analog audio and specialized mastering audio.

The combined complex played a central role in the production of the score and soundtrack for Slumdog Millionaire (2008), which earned Rahman two Academy Awards and a Grammy Award.

== Technical Specifications ==
Panchathan Record Inn and AM Studios pioneered the transition from traditional analog track recording to high-resolution audio workstation.

- Acoustics: The complex features sound isolation rooms optimized for solo acoustic instruments, large choir ensembles, and multi-mic drum setups.
- Mixing and Mastering: AM Studios offers multi-channel surround sound mixing, including support for formats such as Dolby Atmos and DTS-HD Master Audio, making it a primary venue for final theatrical audio mixes in Tamil cinema, Hindi cinema, and Telugu cinema.
- Equipment: The studios house custom mixing consoles, high-end monitoring systems, vintage vacuum-tube preamps, and extensive digital synthesizer modules.

== Cultural and Technological Impact ==
The establishment of Panchathan Record Inn is widely credited with modernizing South Indian film music production. Prior to its opening, most Indian film scores were recorded live using large ensembles in single-take studio settings. A. R. Rahman's studio popularized multi-track recording, digital synthesizer integration, MIDI sequencing, and sampling techniques across the regional industries.

The acoustic architecture for the facility was designed by Hollywood-based acoustic design firm Studio 440 Architecture & Acoustics, with hardware and digital systems supplied and integration managed by Daxco Digital. Core console systems at the complex include the Euphonix System 5 all-digital audio mixing console.

In 2005, A. R. Rahman expanded the complex by constructing AM Studios in collaboration with music director Mani Sharma. The 3,000-square-foot expansion includes a 1,300-square-foot main recording/mix stage accommodating up to 30 musicians, a 380-square-foot control room, variable acoustic music and isolation booths. While Panchathan Record Inn remains Rahman's private composition space, AM Studios functions as a commercial recording, scoring, and dubbing facility utilized by outside film directors and composers.

In 2013, AM Studios acquired a Barco Auro 11.1 3D immersive surround sound system. The system was first deployed to mix the soundtrack and score for the Tamil film Maryan (2013).

Beyond Rahman's personal repertoire, the facility has hosted numerous prominent Indian and international composers, playback singers, sound designers, and session musicians.

== Key Works Recorded ==
To build out a chronological record of other landmark soundtracks and film scores, engineered or mixed at the facility by A. R. Rahman and visiting composers, a selected list includes:

- Roja (1992)
- Gentleman (1993)
- Kadhalan (1994)
- Bombay (1995)
- Rangeela (1995)
- Indian (1996)
- Iruvar (1997)
- Dil Se.. (1998)
- Taal (1999)
- Mudhalvan (1999)
- Alaipayuthey (2000)
- Kandukondain Kandukondain (2000)
- Lagaan (2001)
- Saathiya (2002)
- Swades (2004)
- Rang De Basanti (2006)
- Guru (2007)
- Sivaji: The Boss (2007)
- Jodhaa Akbar (2008)
- Jaane Tu... Ya Jaane Na (2008)
- Slumdog Millionaire (2008)
- Vinnaithaandi Varuvaayaa (2010)
- Enthiran (2010)
- 127 Hours (2010)
- Rockstar (2011)
- Raanjhanaa (2013)
- Maryan (2013)
- Highway (2014)
- Tamasha (2015)
- OK Kanmani (2015)
- Kaatru Veliyidai (2017)
- Mersal (2017)
- 99 Songs (2021)
- Atrangi Re (2021)
- Ponniyin Selvan: I (2022)
- Ponniyin Selvan: II (2023)
- Maamannan (2023)
- The Goat Life (2024)
- Amar Singh Chamkila (2024)
- Raayan (2024)
- Thug Life (2025)
- Chhaava (2025)
- Idli Kadai (2025)
- DC (2026)

== Notable engineers and collaborators ==
The studio complex has hosted several sound engineers and audio technicians in South Indian film music:

- Aravind Crescendo – Sound engineer
- H. Sridhar – Chief sound engineer
- Karthik Sekaran – Sound engineer
- Mani Sharma – Sound engineer and composer
- S. Sivakumar – Sound engineer
- Suresh Permal – Sound engineer

== See also ==
- A. R. Rahman
- KM Music Conservatory
- Qutub-E-Kripa
- Sunshine Orchestra
