= Infinity Festival Hollywood =

Annual event in Los Angeles

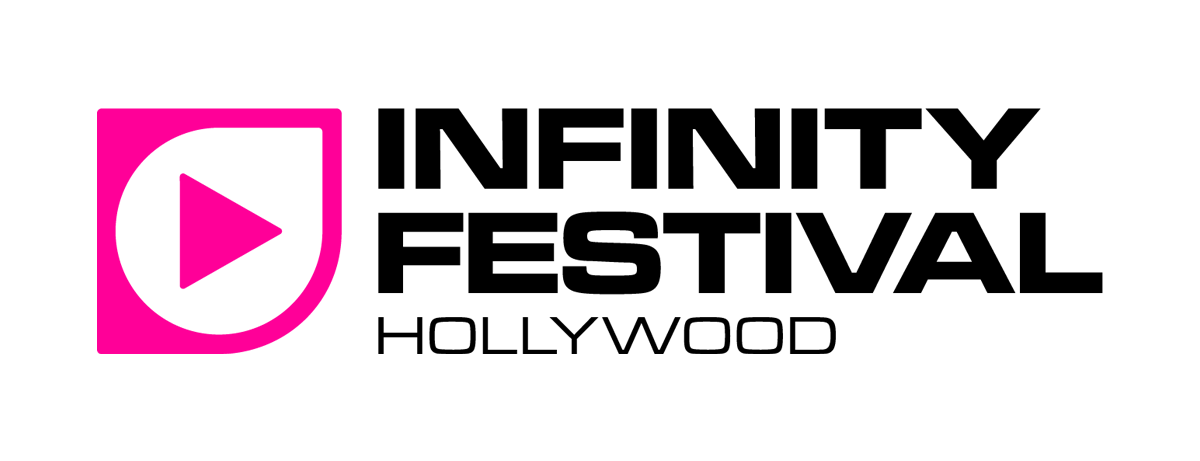
Infinity Festival Hollywood Logo

Infinity Festival Hollywood, a.k.a. Infinity Festival, is a multi-day event held annually each November in Los Angeles. The event, which brings together creative talent from Hollywood and Silicon Valley, celebrates "Story Enabled by Technology" through curated exhibitions, panels, screenings and special events. The festival is supported by several Hollywood studios and leading tech companies. Infinity Festival Hollywood is held at nya Studios, with screenings and special events taking place at various locations in Los Angeles.

== History ==
=== 2018 ===
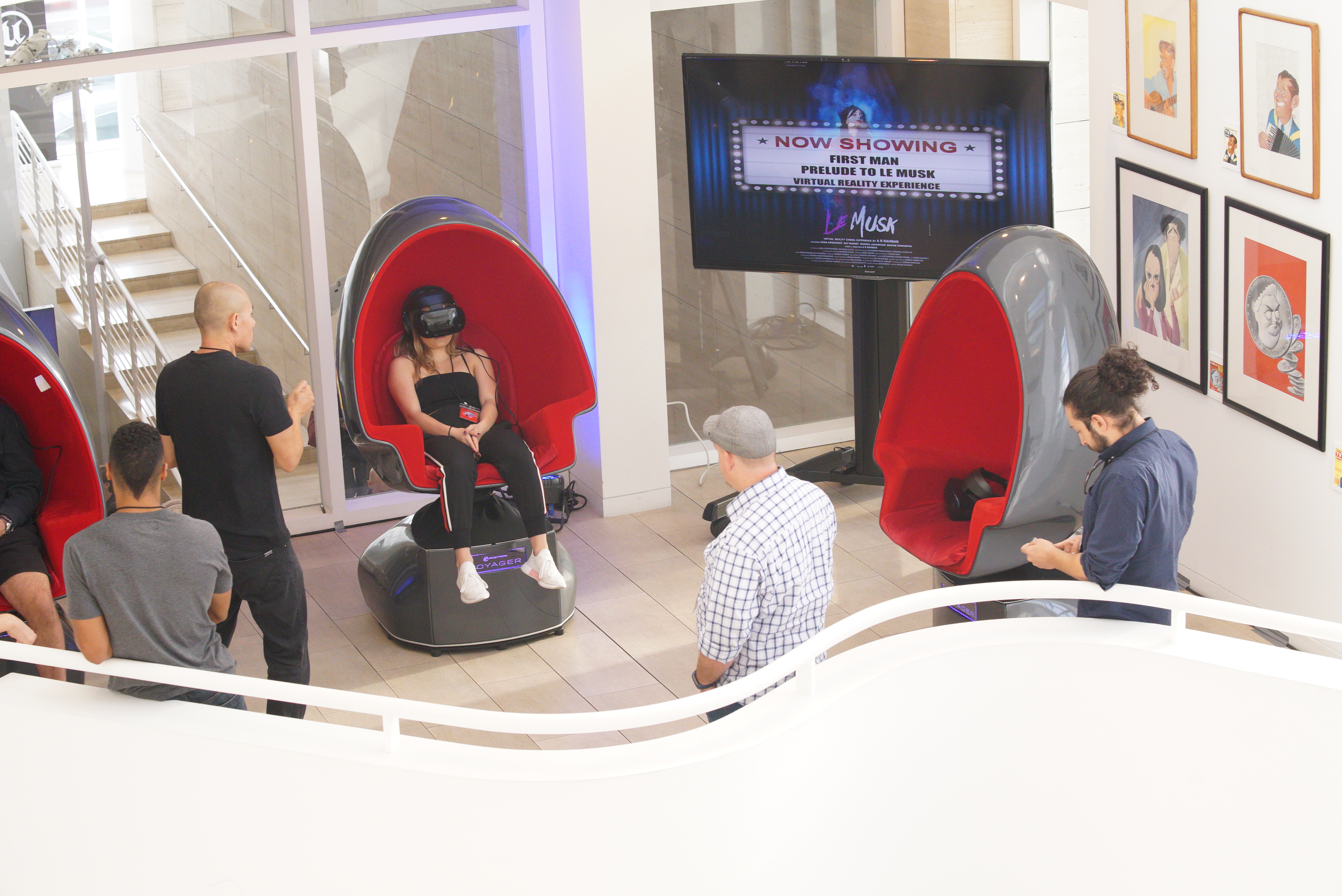
Infinity Film Festival VR Exhibit Hall (2018)

Infinity Festival began in 2018 as Infinity Film Festival. The event was held in Beverly Hills, from November 1–4, 2018. The former Paley Center served as the festival hub, with screenings and special events held in various theaters and other locations in Beverly Hills, including the Writer's Guild Theater. The festival included over 200 speakers and over 100 screenings including studio premieres, a Tech Lab, a Student Lab, 2 floors of exhibitions, industry networking and a Fine Art Gallery. Festival themes included 3D, 4K, Immersive, Blockchain and Artificial Intelligence.

=== 2019 ===
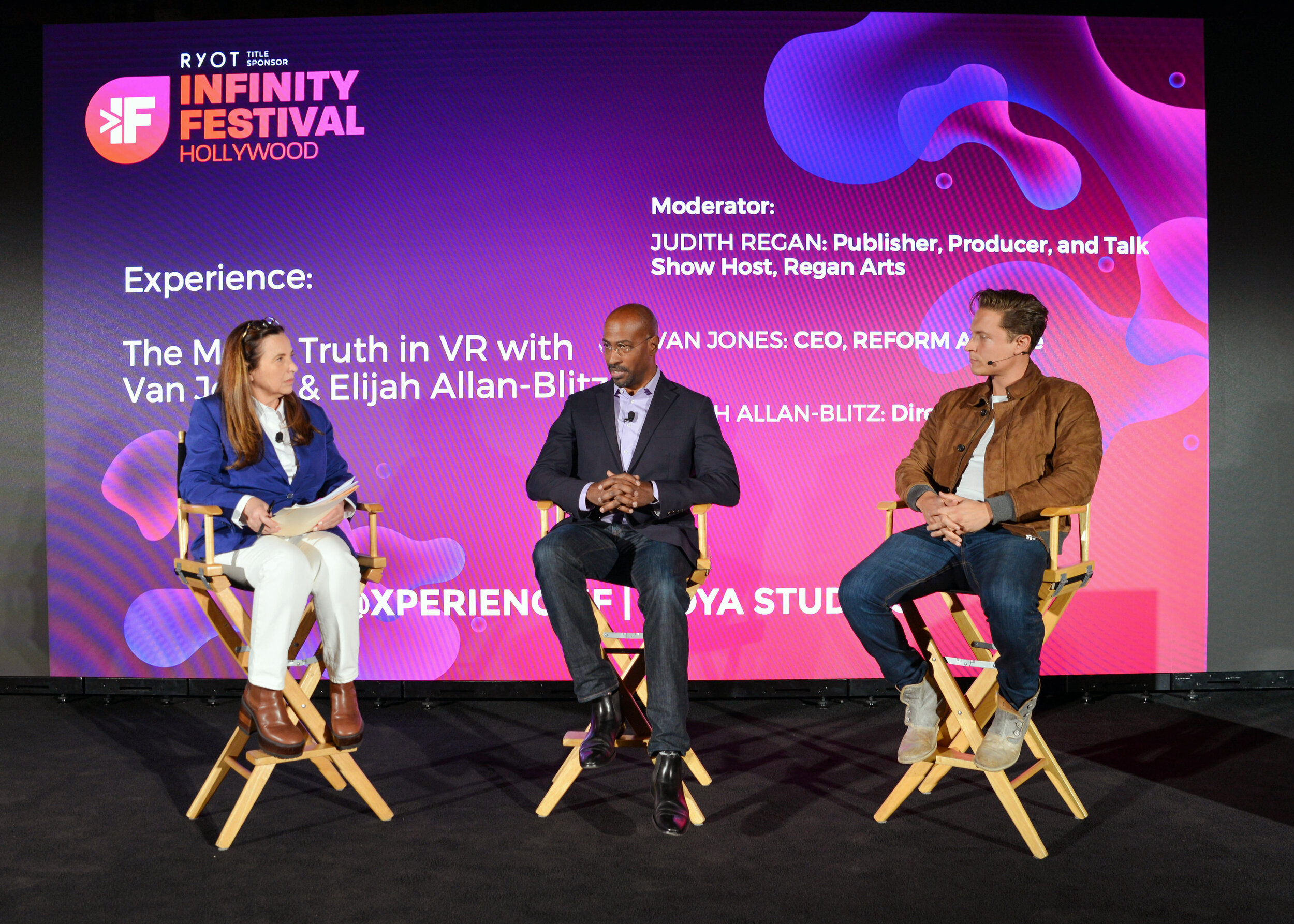
Publisher Judith Regan interviewing Van Jones (CNN) and director Elijah Allan-Blitz (2019)

The festival expanded in 2019 and moved to Hollywood. Retitled Infinity Festival Hollywood, the event took place at nya (formerly Goya) Studios, the Dream Hotel and various theaters around Hollywood, from November 7–9, 2019. The event featured a Main Stage, an Exhibition Hall, a Student Lab, an Innovation Hub and ART+TECH, a Fine Art Gallery. The festival continued its theme of "Story Enabled by Technology" through themes that included 5G, Artificial Intelligence, Blockchain, Immersive Technology and Wellness.

=== 2020 ===
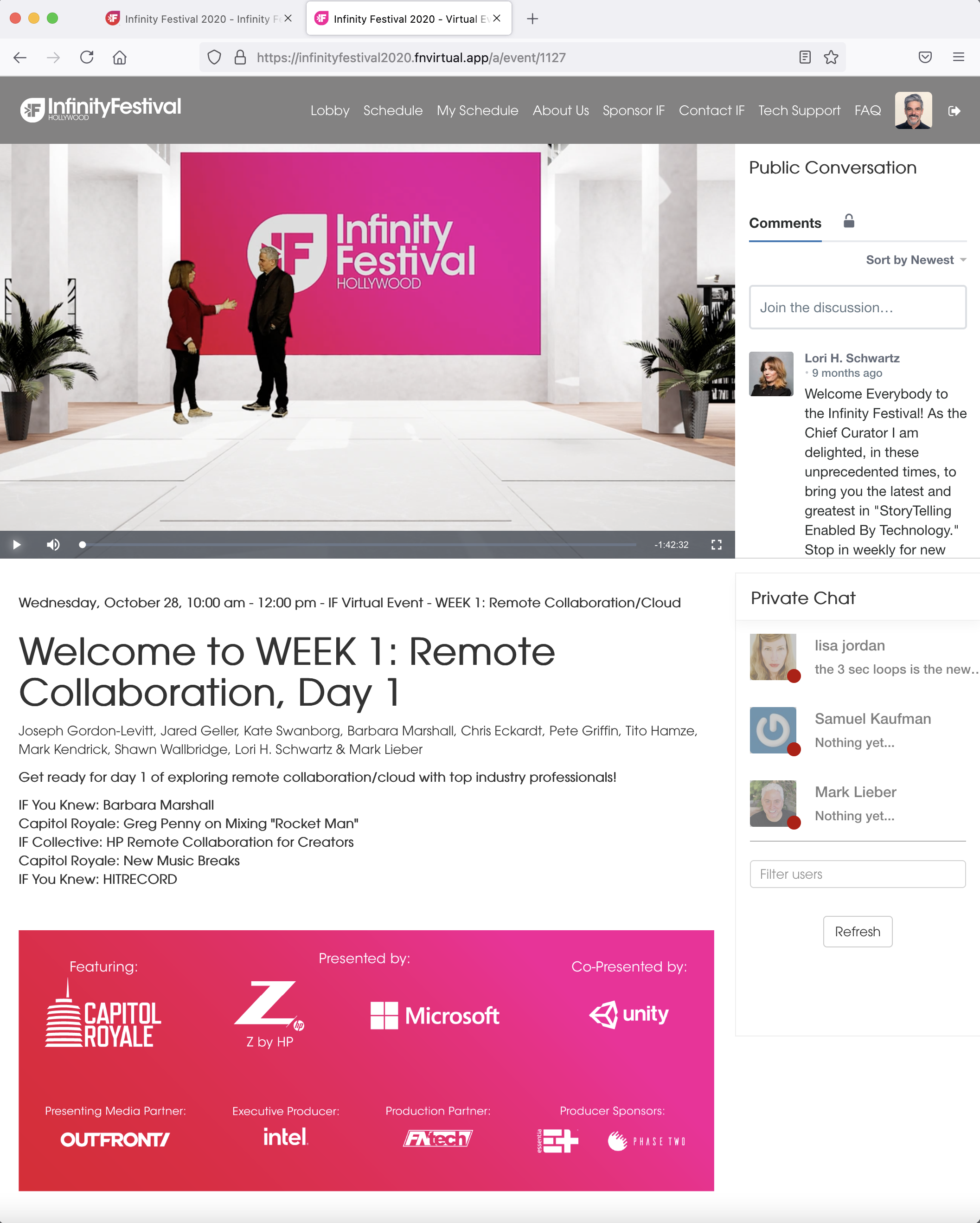
Infinity Festival Virtual Platform (2020)

For 2020, due to the COVID-19 pandemic, the festival was held entirely online with an all-virtual event that was held over eight weeks. The 2020 Infinity Festival began on October 28, 2020, and ran through January 7, 2021. Original material debuted on the Wednesday and Thursday of each of the 8 consecutive weeks (with the exception of Christmas week 2020 and New Year's week 2021.) The festival was free to attend after registration on an online platform which was created specifically for the event. Each week's programming was devoted entirely to one of eight themes: Remote Collaboration, Artificial Intelligence, 3D/Visual effects, Virtual Production, Immersive Experiences, Real Time Storytelling, Entertainment Content, and Wellness Tech. The programming also included ART+TECH, a Fine Art Gallery that featured innovative new media artists including Rashad Newsome and Jam Sutton. Festival speakers included Oscar winning actress and producer Brie Larson, actor and director Joseph Gordon-Levitt, and artist Refik Anadol.

New to the festival in 2020 was a collaboration with Universal Music Group and Capitol Records' Capitol Royale.

=== 2021 ===
Infinity Festival Hollywood continued in 2021 with a hybrid in-person and online event.

New sponsors in 2021 included data centers Equinix and CoreSite, and entertainment production solutions experts Cast & Crew. Featured guests at the festival included comedian/producer Howie Mandel, actor/producer Joseph Gordon-Levitt, composer/musician A.R.Rahman, political commentator and author Doug Schoen, musician/artist Dave Navarro, TikTok star Gabby Murray, social media influencers Dytto and Michael Le. and producer/writer/directors Phil Lord and Chris Miller,

=== 2022 ===
Infinity Festival Hollywood continued for its fifth year with a live event that took place on November 2–5, 2022 at nya Studios and the Dream Hotel. Festival programming continued with a focus on the latest content production trends impacting Hollywood and the tech industries. Tracks and themes for the show included a focus on Virtual Production, Web3 technologies for media and entertainment, and creators and their partnerships with tech companies. The main stage featured an overview of these trends with Hollywood executives and talent sharing their insights. Howie Mandel joined the show for a second year demonstrating Proto, a holoportation solution. The festival's Chief Curator, Lori H. Schwartz, lead a conversation with Oscar, BAFTA, and Grammy Award-winning composer A.R. Rahman and Intel's Ravi Velhal on the impact technology had on the storytelling for Rahman's VR directorial debut, "Le Musk."
