= List of awards and nominations received by A. R. Rahman =

List of awards won by A. R. Rahman

List of awards won by A. R. Rahman
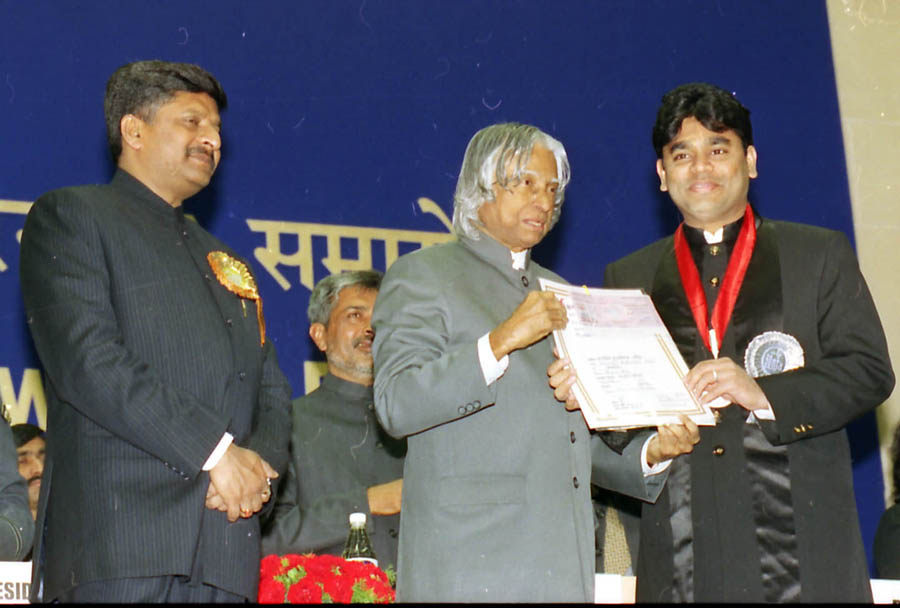
- President Dr. A. P. J. Abdul Kalam, presenting the national film award for best music direction, year of 2002 to A. R. Rahman for the tamil film, Kannathil Muthamittal

Awards & Nominations
Awards	Won	Nominated
Academy Awards	2	5
British Academy of Film and Television Arts	1	2
National Film Awards	7	7
Critics' Choice Awards	2	3
Filmfare Awards	15	29
Filmfare Awards South	18	33
Filmfare OTT Awards	2	2
IIFA Awards	16	22
IIFA Utsavam	3	6
Golden Globes	1	2
Grammy Awards	2	2
Satellite Awards	1	4
MTV Video Music Award	1	3
Tamil Nadu State Film Awards	6	6
Vijay Awards	5	5
World Soundtrack Awards	3	6
South Indian International Movie Awards	3	14
Mirchi Music Awards	19	34
Zee Cine Awards	7	10
Screen Awards	9	9
- Total number of wins and nominations
Totals	177	250
- Footnotes

A. R. Rahman is an Indian composer, singer and songwriter. Described by Time as one of the most popular composers, he has provided musical scores predominantly for Tamil and Hindi films apart from a few films in other regional film industries of India and international productions. Rahman started his career by composing musical scores for documentaries, advertisements and Television channels. He made his debut as a film composer through Roja after being approached by its director Mani Ratnam. The soundtrack became popular upon release, which led to him winning the National Film Award for Best Music Direction at the 40th National Film Awards, the first time for a debutant. (Note: Rahman was tied with Ilaiyaraaja before Balu Mahendra, the chairman of the jury decided to vote in favour of Rahman.) As of 2024, Rahman has garnered 7 National Film Awards, 15 Filmfare Awards and 18 Filmfare Awards South, a record for an Indian composer. A. R. Rahman wins big Hollywood Music in Media Awards and Hollywood Independent Music Awards in 2024 for, The Goat Life (natively known as Aadujeevitham)

== Honorary ==
=== Government ===
Year	Award	Honouring body	Notes
1994	Kalaimamani	Government of Tamil Nadu	Awarded for contributions to music
2000	Padma Shri	Government of India	Fourth-highest civilian award
2001	Awadh Samman	Government of Uttar Pradesh	Awarded for exceptional and meritorious contribution in music
2004	National Lata Mangeshkar Award	Government of Madhya Pradesh	Awarded for contributions to music
2010	Padma Bhushan	Government of India	Third-highest civilian award

=== Honorary Doctorate ===
Year	Honouring body
2009	Anna University
2009	Aligarh Muslim University
2009	Middlesex University
2014	Royal Conservatoire of Scotland
2014	Berklee College of Music

=== Other Honorary Awards ===
- 1994 – Sanskriti Award
  - Contributions to music awarded by the Sanskriti Foundation
- 1995 – Bommai Nagi Reddy Award
- 1995 – Mauritius National Award
  - Contributions to music awarded by Mauritius
- 1995 – Malaysian Award
  - Contributions to music awarded by Malaysia
- 1995 – Rajiv Gandhi Award
- 1996 – 'Gana Kaladhar'
- 2001 – Al-Ameen Education Society Community Award
- 2002 – Amir Khusro Sangeet Nawaz Award
- 2005 – Mahavir-Mahatma Award
- 2006 – Honorary Award from Stanford University
- 2006 – Sanatan Sangeet Puraskar
  - Contributions to music awarded by the Sanatan Sangeet Sanskriti
- 2006 – Swaralaya Yesudas Award
  - Swaralaya-Kairali-Yesudas Award for outstanding performance in the music field
- 2007 – Limca Book of Records Indian of the Year for Contribution to Popular Music
- 2008 – CNN-IBN Global Indian of the Year
- 2008 – NDTV Indian of the Year
- 2008 – Rotary Club of Madras
  - Lifetime Achievement Award
- 2009 – CNN-IBN Entertainer of the Year
- 2009 – CNN-IBN Indian of the Year
- 2009 – NDTV Global Indian Entertainer Award
- 2009 – UK Asian Music Award for Outstanding Achievement
- 2009 – Placed by Time magazine in List of World's Most Influential People.
- 2010 – 10th Annual Mahindra Indo-American Arts Council Film Festival
  - Special Achievement Award for Significant Contribution to the Globalization of Indian Music
- 2010 – British Asian Awards for Outstanding Achievement in Music
- 2010 – Indira Gandhi Award for National Integration
- 2010 – FICCI Global Icon
- 2010 – "Crystal Award"
  - Lifetime Achievement Award instituted by World Economic Forum
- 2010 – Outstanding Achievement in Music at The Asian Awards
- 2011 – GQ Legend of the Year Award
- 2011 – Lifetime Achievement Award at the 8th Dubai International Film Festival
- 2012 – Vuclip Icons of the Year 2012 – Most Admired Bollywood Music Composer
- 2016 – Fukuoka Prize (Japan)
- 2018 – Lifetime Achievement Award From KISS Foundation
- 2019 – "Global Icon of Inspiration" (Behindwoods Gold Mic Music Awards)
- 2025 - Lakshminarayana International Award

== Film awards and nominations ==
=== Academy Awards ===
Year	Film	Category	Result
2009	Slumdog Millionaire	Best Original Score	Won
2009	Slumdog Millionaire	Best Original Song (Shared with Gulzar for "Jai Ho")	Won
2009	Slumdog Millionaire	Best Original Song (Shared with M.I.A. for "O... Saya")	Nominated
2011	127 Hours	Best Original Score	Nominated
2011	127 Hours	Best Original Song (Shared with Dido and Rollo Armstrong for "If I Rise")	Nominated

=== BAFTA Awards ===
Year	Film	Category	Result
2009	Slumdog Millionaire	Best Original Score	Won
2011	127 Hours	Best Original Score	Nominated

=== Golden Globe Awards ===
Year	Film	Category	Result
2009	Slumdog Millionaire	Best Original Score	Won
2011	127 Hours	Best Original Score	Nominated

=== Grammy Awards ===
Year	Film	Category	Result
2010	Slumdog Millionaire	Best Compilation Soundtrack Album for a Motion Picture, Television or Other Visual Media	Won
2010	Slumdog Millionaire	Best Song Written for a Motion Picture, Television or Other Visual Media (For "Jai Ho")	Won

=== World Soundtrack Awards ===
Year	Film	Category	Result
2009	Slumdog Millionaire	Best Original Song Written Directly for a Film (Shared with Gulzar for "Jai Ho")	Won
2009	Slumdog Millionaire	Best Original Song Written Directly for a Film (Shared with M.I.A. for "O... Saya")	Nominated
2009	Slumdog Millionaire	Best Original Soundtrack of the Year	Nominated
2011	127 Hours	Best Original Song Written Directly for a Film (Shared with Dido and Rollo Armstrong for "If I Rise")	Nominated
2011	127 Hours	The Public Choice Award	Won
2017	Viceroy's House	The Public Choice Award	Won

=== Satellite Awards ===
Year	Film	Category	Result
2008	Slumdog Millionaire	Best Original Score	Won
2008	Slumdog Millionaire	Best Original Song (Shared with Gulzar for "Jai Ho")	Nominated
2010	127 Hours	Best Original Score	Nominated
2010	127 Hours	Best Original Song (Shared with Dido and Rollo Armstrong for "If I Rise")	Nominated

=== Critics' Choice Movie Awards ===
Year	Film	Category	Result
2008	Slumdog Millionaire	Best Score	Won
2008	Slumdog Millionaire	Best Song (Shared with Gulzar for "Jai Ho")	Nominated
2010	127 Hours	Best Song (Shared with Dido and Rollo Armstrong for "If I Rise")	Won

=== Other International Awards ===
Year	Awards	Category	Film / Song / Theatre	Result
2003	Laurence Olivier Awards (United Kingdom)	Best New Musical	Bombay Dreams	Nominated
2006	Dora Mavor Moore Awards (Canada)	General Theatre Division – Outstanding Musical Direction (along with Värttinä)	The Lord of the Rings	Nominated
2008	Broadcast Film Critics Association Awards	Critics' Choice Award for Best Song	''Jai Ho" from Slumdog Millionaire	Nominated
2008	Houston Film Critics Society Awards	Best Original Song (performed by Sukhwinder Singh, written by A. R. Rahman and Gulzar)	''Jai Ho" from Slumdog Millionaire	Nominated
2008	Houston Film Critics Society Awards	Best Original Score	Slumdog Millionaire	Nominated
2008	San Diego Film Critics Society Awards (United States)	Best Score	Slumdog Millionaire	Won
2008	Chicago Film Critics Association Awards (United States)	Best Original Score	Slumdog Millionaire	Nominated
2008	New York Film Critics Online Awards (United States)	NYFCO Award for Best Score	Slumdog Millionaire	Won
2008	Los Angeles Film Critics Association Awards (United States)	Best Music Score	Slumdog Millionaire	Won
2008	Black Reel Awards	Best Original Soundtrack	Slumdog Millionaire	Won
2008	Phoenix Film Critics Society Awards	Best Original Score	Slumdog Millionaire	Won
2009	MTV Movie Awards	Best Song From a Movie	''Jai Ho" from Slumdog Millionaire	Nominated
2009	UK Asian Music Awards (United Kingdom)	Outstanding Achievement by an Asian in Music Field	-	Won
2010	BMI London Awards	Best Score	Couples Retreat	Won
2010	WAFCA Awards	Best Score	127 Hours	Nominated
2010	Denver Film Critics Society Awards	Best Song	"If I Rise" from 127 Hours	Won
2010	Houston Film Critics Society Awards	Best Original Song (performed by Dido and A. R. Rahman, written by A. R. Rahman and Rollo)	"If I Rise" from 127 Hours	Nominated
2010	Houston Film Critics Society Awards	Best Original Score	127 Hours	Nominated

=== National Film Awards ===
Year	Film	Category	Result
1992	Roja (Tamil)	Best Music Direction	Won
1996	Minsara Kanavu (Tamil)	Best Music Direction	Won
2001	Lagaan (Hindi)	Best Music Direction	Won
2002	Kannathil Muthamittal (Tamil)	Best Music Direction	Won
2017	Kaatru Veliyidai (Tamil)	Best Music Direction	Won
2017	Mom (Hindi)	Best Background Score	Won
2022	Ponniyin Selvan 1 (Tamil)	Best Background Score	Won

=== Tamil Nadu State Film Awards ===
Year	Film	Category	Result
1992	Roja	Best Music Direction	Won
1993	Gentleman	Best Music Direction	Won
1994	Kaadhalan	Best Music Direction	Won
1996	Minsaara Kanavu	Best Music Direction	Won
1999	Sangamam	Best Music Direction	Won
2014	Kaaviya Thalaivan	Best Music Direction	Won
2022	Ponniyin Selvan	Best Music Direction	Won

=== Filmfare Awards ===
==== Soundtrack ====
Year	Film	Category	Result
1996	Rangeela	Best Music Director	Won
1999	Dil Se..	Best Music Director	Won
2000	Taal	Best Music Director	Won
2002	Lagaan	Best Music Director	Won
2003	Saathiya	Best Music Director	Won
2005	Swades	Best Music Director	Nominated
2007	Rang De Basanti	Best Music Director	Won
2008	Guru	Best Music Director	Won
2009	Ghajini	Best Music Director	Nominated
2009	Jodhaa Akbar	Best Music Director	Nominated
2009	Jaane Tu... Ya Jaane Na	Best Music Director	Won
2010	Delhi 6	Best Music Director	Won
2012	Rockstar	Best Music Director	Won
2014	Raanjhanaa	Best Music Director	Nominated
2016	Tamasha	Best Music Director	Nominated
2021	Dil Bechara	Best Music Director	Nominated
2022	Atrangi Re	Best Music Director	Nominated
2022	Mimi	Best Music Director	Nominated

==== Background Score ====
Year	Film	Category	Result
2003	The Legend of Bhagat Singh	Best Background Score	Won
2005	Swades	Best Background Score	Won
2008	Guru	Best Background Score	Won
2009	Jodhaa Akbar	Best Background Score	Won
2011	Raavan	Best Background Score	Nominated
2015	Highway	Best Background Score	Nominated
2018	Mom	Best Background Score	Nominated
2021	Dil Bechera	Best Background Score	Nominated
2022	99 Songs	Best Background Score	Nominated

Playback Singer

Year	Film	Category	Result
2008	Guru	Best Male Playback Singer for the Song "Tere Bina"	Nominated

==== Special awards ====
Year	Category	Result
1995	R. D. Burman Award for New Music Talent	Won

=== Filmfare Awards South ===
==== Tamil ====
Year	Film	Category	Result
1993	Roja	Best Music Director	Won
1994	Gentleman	Best Music Director	Won
1995	Kaadhalan	Best Music Director	Won
1996	Bombay	Best Music Director	Won
1997	Kadhal Desam	Best Music Director	Won
1998	Minsaara Kanavu	Best Music Director	Won
1999	Jeans	Best Music Director	Won
2000	Mudhalvan	Best Music Director	Won
2001	Alai Payuthey	Best Music Director	Won
2004	Boys	Best Music Director	Nominated
2007	Sillunu Oru Kadhal	Best Music Director	Won
2008	Sivaji: The Boss	Best Music Director	Won
2008	Azhagiya Tamil Magan	Best Music Director	Nominated
2009	Sakkarakatti	Best Music Director	Nominated
2011	Vinnaithaandi Varuvaayaa	Best Music Director	Won
2011	Enthiran	Best Music Director	Nominated
2014	Kadal	Best Music Director	Won
2014	Maryan	Best Music Director	Nominated
2015	Kaaviyathalaivan	Best Music Director	Nominated
2016	I	Best Music Director	Won
2016	O Kadhal Kanmani	Best Music Director	Nominated
2017	Achcham Yenbadhu Madamaiyada	Best Music Director	Won
2017	24	Best Music Director	Nominated
2018	Mersal	Best Music Director	Won
2018	Kaatru Veliyidai	Best Music Director	Nominated
2019	Chekka Chivantha Vaanam	Best Music Director	Nominated
2022	Ponniyin Selvan: I	Best Music Director	Won
2022	Vendhu Thanindhathu Kaadu	Best Music Director	Nominated
2022	Vendhu Thanindhathu Kaadu	Best Male Playback Singer for the song "Marakuma Nenjam"	Nominated
2023	Ponniyin Selvan: II	Best Music Director	Nominated

==== Telugu ====
Year	Film	Category	Result
2011	Ye Maaya Chesave	Best Music Director	Won
2017	Sahasam Swasaga Sagipo	Best Music Director	Nominated

==== Malayalam ====
Year	Film	Category	Result
2022	Malayankunju	Best Music Director	Nominated

=== Filmfare OTT Awards ===
==== Soundtrack ====
Year	Film	Category	Result
2024	Amar Singh Chamkila	Best Music Director	Won

==== Background Score ====
Year	Film	Category	Result
2024	Amar Singh Chamkila	Best Background Score	Won

=== IIFA Awards ===
==== Soundtrack ====
Year	Film	Category	Result
2000	Taal	Best Music Director	Won
2001	Fiza	Best Music Director	Nominated
2002	Lagaan	Best Music Director	Won
2002	Zubeidaa	Best Music Director	Nominated
2003	Saathiya	Best Music Director	Won
2007	Rang De Basanti	Best Music Director	Won
2008	Guru	Best Music Director	Won
2009	Jodhaa Akbar	Best Music Director	Won
2009	Ghajini	Best Music Director	Nominated
2010	Delhi-6	Best Music Director	Nominated
2012	Rockstar	Best Music Director	Won
2013	Jab Tak Hai Jaan	Best Music Director	Nominated
2022	Atrangi Re	Best Music Director	Won
2022	99 Songs	Best Music Director	Nominated

==== Background Score ====
Year	Film	Category	Result
2003	Saathiya	Best Background Score	Won
2007	Rang De Basanti	Best Background Score	Won
2008	Guru	Best Background Score	Won
2009	Jodhaa Akbar	Best Background Score	Won
2012	Rockstar	Best Background Score	Won
2022	Atrangi Re	Best Background Score	Won

==== Special awards ====
Year	Category	Result
2008	Outstanding Contribution by an Indian in International Cinema	Won
2009	Music Director of the Decade (for "Taal, Lagaan, Saathiya, Rang De Basanti and Guru")	Won

=== SIIMA Awards ===
Year	Language	Film	Category	Result
2013	Kannada	Godfather	Best Music Director	Nominated
2014	Tamil	Maryan	Best Music Director	Nominated
2015	Tamil	Kaaviya Thalaivan	Best Music Director	Nominated
2016	Tamil	OK Kanmani	Best Music Director	Nominated
2017	Tamil	Achcham Yenbadhu Madamaiyada	Best Music Director	Won
2018	Tamil	Kaatru Veliyidai	Best Music Director	Won
2018	Tamil	Mersal	Best Music Director	Won
2018	Tamil	Mersal	Best Male Playback Singer for the Song "Neethane Neethane"	Nominated
2019	Tamil	Chekka Chivantha Vaanam	Best Music Director	Nominated
2019	Tamil	Chekka Chivantha Vaanam	Best Male Playback Singer for the Song "Mazhai Kuruvi"	Nominated
2021	Tamil	Bigil	Best Music Director	Nominated
2021	Tamil	Bigil	Best Male Playback Singer for the Song "Singappenney"	Nominated
2023	Tamil	Ponniyin Selvan: I	Best Music Director	Nominated
2023	Tamil	Vendhu Thanindhadhu Kaadu	Best Male Playback Singer for the Song "Marakkuma Nenjam"	Nominated

=== Mirchi Music Awards ===
Year	Film	Category	Results
2009	Jaane Tu Ya Jaane Na	Album of the Year	Won
2009	Jaane Tu Ya Jaane Na	Music Composer of the Year	Won
2009	Jaane Tu Ya Jaane Na	Listeners Choice Album of the Year	Won
2009	Jaane Tu Ya Jaane Na	Listeners Choice Song of the Year for ''Kabhi Kabhi Aditi"	Won
2009	Jodhaa Akbar	Song of the Year for ''Jashn-e-Bahara"	Won
2009	Jodhaa Akbar	Best Background Score	Won
2010	Delhi-6	Album of the Year	Won
2010	Delhi-6	Song of the Year for ''Masakali''	Won
2010	Delhi-6	Music Composer of the Year	Won
2010	Delhi-6	Best Song Arranger & Programmer for ''Masakali''	Won
2011	Raavan	Best Background Score	Nominated
2011	Raavan	Best Song Arranger & Programmer for ''Ranjha Ranjha''	Nominated
2012	Rockstar	Album of the Year	Won
2012	Rockstar	Music Composer of the year for ''Nadaan Parinde''	Won
2012	Rockstar	Music Composer of the year for ''[[Sadda Haq (song)|Sadda Haq]]''	Nominated
2012	Rockstar	Song of the Year for ''Nadaan Parinde''	Nominated
2012	Rockstar	Song of the Year for ''[[Sadda Haq (song)|Sadda Haq]]''	Nominated
2012	Rockstar	Song representing Sufi tradition for ''Kun Faya Kun''	Won
2012	Rockstar	Listeners Choice Album of the Year	Won
2012	Rockstar	Listeners Choice Song of the Year for ''Nadaan Parinde''	Won
2013	Jab Tak Hai Jaan	Best Background Score	Nominated
2015	Highway	Best Background Score	Nominated
2016	Tamasha	Song of the Year for ''Agar Tum Saath Ho''	Nominated
2016	Tamasha	Listeners Choice Song of the Year for ''Agar Tum Saath Ho''	Won
2022	Atrangi Re	Album of the Year	Nominated
2022	Atrangi Re	Song of the Year for ''Chaka Chak''	Nominated
2022	Atrangi Re	Music Composer of the year ''Chaka Chak''	Nominated
2022	Atrangi Re	Music Composer of the year ''Rait Zara Si''	Nominated
2022	Atrangi Re	Music Composer of the year ''Tere Rang''	Nominated
2022	Atrangi Re	Listeners Choice Album of the Year	Won
2022	Atrangi Re	Listeners Choice Song of the Year for ''Chaka Chak''	Won
2022	Dil Bechara	Album of the Year	Nominated
2022	Dil Bechara	Listeners Choice Album of the Year	Nominated
2022	Mimi	Best Song Arranger & Programmer for ''Param Sundari''	Won

=== Other awards ===
==== Ananda Vikatan Cinema Awards ====
- 2011 – Best Music Director – Vinnaithaandi Varuvaayaa
- 2016 – Best Music Director – O Kadhal Kanmani
- 2017 – Best Music Director – Mersal and Kaatru Veliyidai
- 2022 – Best Music Director – Ponniyin Selvan: I, Vendhu Thanindhathu Kaadu & Cobra
- 2022 – Best Male Playback Singer – For the song "Marakkuma Nenjam" from Vendhu Thanindhathu Kaadu

==== BIG Star Entertainment Awards ====
- 2011 – BIG Star Most Entertaining Song – "Saadda Haq" (Rockstar)

==== Bollywood Music Awards ====
- 2000 – Best Music Direction – Taal
- 2000 – Song of the Year – "Taal Se Taal Mila" (Taal)
- 2002 – Best Music Director – Lagaan
- 2003 – Best Music Director – Saathiya

==== CineGoers' Award ====
- 1993 – Best Music Director (Tamil) – Roja
- 1994 – Best Music Director (Tamil) – Gentleman
- 1995 – Best Music Director (Tamil) – Kaadhalan
- 1996 – Best Music Director (Tamil) – Bombay

==== Cinema Express Awards ====
- 1993 – Best Music Director (Tamil) – Roja
- 1994 – Best Music Director (Tamil) – Gentleman
- 1995 – Best Music Director (Tamil) – Kaadhalan
- 1997 – Best Music Director (Tamil) – Kadhal Desam
- 1999 – Best Music Director (Tamil) – Jeans
- 2013 – Best Music Director (Tamil) – Maryan

==== CineMAA Awards ====
- 2011 – Best Music Director – Ye Maaya Chesave

==== CNN-IBN Song of the Year Award ====
- 2006 – "Roobaroo" (Rang De Basanti)
- 2007 – "Tere Bina" (Guru)
- 2008 – "Kabhi Kabhi Aditi" (Jaane Tu Ya Jaane Na)

==== Film Fans' Awards ====
- 1993 – Best Music Director (Tamil) – Roja
- 1994 – Best Music Director (Tamil) – Gentleman
- 1995 – Best Music Director (Tamil) – Kaadhalan
- 1996 – Best Music Director (Tamil) – Bombay

==== Global Film & Music Festival Award ====
- 2023 – Best Music Composer for Feature Film in Foreign Language – Iravin Nizhal

==== Global Indian Film Awards (GIFA) ====
- 2007 – Best Music Director – Rang De Basanti
- 2007 – Best Background Music – Rang De Basanti

==== Global Indian Music Academy Awards (GIMA) ====
- 2012 – Best Music Director – Rockstar
- 2012 – Best Background Score – Rockstar
- 2012 – Best Album – Rockstar
- 2015 – Best Album – Highway

==== IIFA Utsavam ====
- 2017 – Best Music Director (Tamil) – Achcham Yenbadhu Madamaiyada
- 2024 – Best Music Director (Tamil) – Ponniyin Selvan 2
- 2024 – Best Music Director - Background Score (Tamil) – Ponniyin Selvan 2

==== ITunes Music Awards ====
- Rang De Basanti (2006) – ITunes Music Award for Best Indian Album
- Vinnaithaandi Varuvaayaa (2010) – iTunes Music Award for Best Tamil Album
- Ye Maaya Chesave (2010) – iTunes Music Award for Best Telugu Album
- Maryan (2013) – ITunes Music Award for Best Tamil Album
- Rockstar (2011) – iTunes Music Award for Best Indian Album
- O Kadhal Kanmani (2015) – ITunes Music Award for Best Indian Album
- O Kadhal Kanmani (2015) – ITunes Music Award for Best Artist

==== Jaipur International Film Festival Award ====
- 2023 – Best Music – Iravin Nizhal

==== Just Plain Folks Music Awards ====
- 2009 – Just Plain Folks Music Award For Best Music Album – Varalaru

==== Kalasaagar Awards ====
- 1993 – Best Music Director (Tamil) – Roja
- 1994 – Best Music Director (Tamil) – Gentleman
- 1995 – Best Music Director (Tamil) – Kaadhalan
- 1996 – Best Music Director (Tamil) – Bombay

==== MTV Awards ====
- MTV Video Music Awards
  - 1999 – International Viewer's Choice Awards (MTV India) – "Dil Se Re" – Dil Se..
- MTV Asia Awards
  - 2003 – MTV Asia Award for Favorite Artist India
- MTV Immies
  - 2003 – Best Music Composer (Film Category) – "Saathiya" – Saathiya

==== Sangeet Awards ====
- 2004 – Best Music Direction (Critics Award) – Yuva
- 2004 – Best Music Arrangement (Critics Award) – "Yeh Rishta" – Meenaxi: A Tale of Three Cities
- 2005 – Best Music Direction (Critics Award) – Swades

==== Screen Videocon Awards / Star Screen Awards ====
- 1998 – Best Non-Film Album – Vande Mataram (Non-Film category)
- 2000 – Best Music Director – Taal
- 2007 – Best Background Music – Rang De Basanti
- 2008 – Best Music Director – Guru
- 2008 – Best Background Music – Guru
- 2009 – Best Music Director – Jaane Tu...Ya Jaane Na
- 2009 – Best Background Music – Jodhaa Akbar
- 2010 – Best Music Director – Delhi-6
- 2012 – Best Music Directoe – Rockstar

==== Screen Videocon Awards South ====
- 1997 – Best Music Director (Tamil) – Kadhal Desam
- 1998 – Best Music Director (Tamil) – Minsara Kanavu

==== SuMu Music Awards ====
- 1993: R. D. Burman Award for Best New Composer

==== Sunfeast Tamil Music Awards ====
- 2008: Best Music Composer of the Year – Sivaji: The Boss

==== V. Shantaram Award ====
- 2001 – Best Music Director – Taal
- 2007 – Best Music Director – Guru
- 2008 – Best Music Director – Jodhaa Akbar

==== Vijay Awards ====
- 2007 – Best Music Director – Sivaji
- 2008 – Chevalier Sivaji Ganesan Award for Excellence in Indian Cinema
- 2010 – Best Music Director – Vinnaithaandi Varuvaayaa
- 2013 – Best Music Director – Kadal
- 2017 – Best Music Director – Kaatru Veliyidai

==== Zee Cine Awards ====
- 2000 – Best Music Director – Taal
- 2002 – Best Music Director – Lagaan
- 2003 – Best Music Director – Saathiya
- 2007 – Best Music Director – Rang De Basanti
- 2008 – Best Music Director – Guru
- 2008 – Best Background Music – Guru
- 2012 – Best Music Director – Rockstar

==== Zee Cine Awards Tamil ====
- Zee Cine Award Tamil for Pride of Indian Cinema (2020)

=== Nominations ===
==== BIG Star Entertainment Awards ====
- 2011 – BIG Star Most Entertaining Music – Rockstar

==== MTV Awards ====
- MTV India
  - 2006 – MTV Youth Icon of the Year

==== Screen Weekly Awards ====
- 2002 – Best Music Director – Lagaan
- 2002 – Best Background Score – Lagaan

==== CineMAA Awards ====
- 2004 – Best Music Director – Nee Manasu Naaku Telusu

==== Zee Cine Awards ====
- 2005 – Best Music Director – Swades
- 2005 – Best Background Score – Meenaxi: A Tale of Three Cities
- 2011 – Best Background Score – Raavan

== See also ==
- List of accolades received by Slumdog Millionaire
