= List of films directed by Mani Ratnam featuring A. R. Rahman =

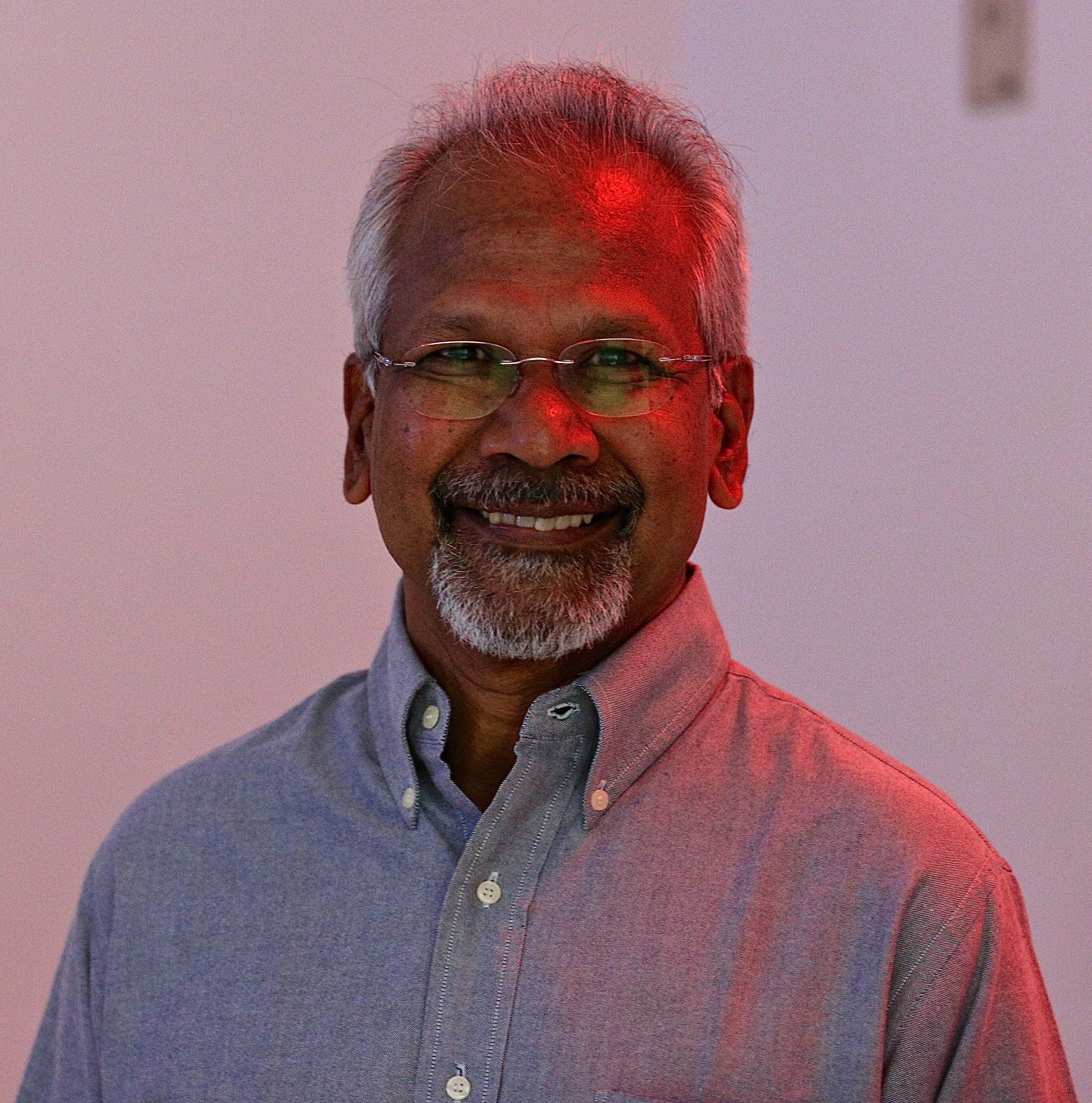
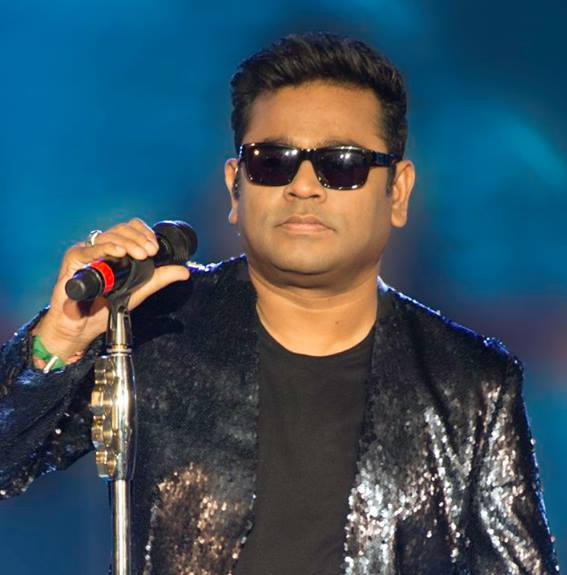
Image of Mani Ratnam and A. R. Rahman

This is a list of films made by the Indian director Mani Ratnam featuring the composer A. R. Rahman.

== History and significance ==
Mani Ratnam worked alongside Ilaiyaraaja before he introduced newcomer A. R. Rahman in Roja. A. R. Rahman, in spite of his reluctance, decided to seriously take up work in films. It is considered a milestone in Tamil and Indian film music that heralded the start of a new era. It was subsequently listed in Time magazine's World's "10 Best Soundtracks" of all time. Bombay, the most significant work from their combination, is the largest selling Indian music album of all time, with unprecedented sales of 12 million records.

== List of films ==
Year	Film	Original Language	Awards^{[B]}
1992	Roja	Tamil	Cinema Express Award for Best Music; Cine Goers' Award for Best Music; Film Fans' Award for Best Music; Filmfare Award for Best Music Director – Tamil; Kalasaagar Award for Best Music; National Film Award for Best Music Direction; SuMu Music Awards: R. D. Burman Award for Best New Composer; Tamil Nadu State Film Award for Best Music Director
1993	Thiruda Thiruda	Tamil	MagnaSound Award
1995	Bombay	Tamil	Cine Goers' Award for Best Music; Film Fans' Award for Best Music; Kalasaagar Award for Best Music; Filmfare Award for Best Music Director – Tamil; Listed in The Guardian 's "1000 Albums to Hear Before You Die" "Kannalane/ Kehna hi kya" listed in The Guardian 's "1000 Songs Everyone Must Hear"; Sold 15 million soundtrack albums.
1997	Iruvar	Tamil	
1998	Dil Se..	Hindi	Filmfare Award for Best Music Director; MTV Video Music Award for Best Song (International Viewer's Choice) for "Dil Se Re" "Chaiyya Chaiyya" was 9th in BBC World Service top 10 songs of all time
2000	Alaipayuthey	Tamil	Alaipaayuthey; Filmfare Award for Best Music Director – Tamil; Saathiya; Filmfare Award for Best Music Director; IIFA Award for Best Music Director; Zee Cine Award for Best Music Director; Bollywood Movie Award for Best Music Director; MTV Award for Best Composer (Film Category)
2002	Kannathil Muthamittal	Tamil	National Film Award for Best Music Direction
2004	Aaytha Ezhuthu	Tamil	
2004	Yuva	Hindi	Sangeet Award for Best Music Direction
2007	Guru	Hindi	Filmfare Award for Best Background Score; Filmfare Award for Best Music Director; IIFA Award for Best Background Score; IIFA Award for Best Music Director; Screen Award for Best Background Music; Screen Award for Best Music Director; Zee Cine Award for Best Background Music; Zee Cine Award for Best Music Director; Nominated – Filmfare Award for Best Male Playback Singer for "Tere Bina"
2010	Raavanan	Tamil	Raavanan; Mirchi Music Award for Best Music Director – Tamil
2010	Raavan	Hindi	Raavan; Nominated—Mirchi Music Award for Best Background Score; Nominated—Screen Award for Best Background Score; Nominated—GiMA Award for Best Background Score; Nominated—Filmfare Award for Best Background Score; Nominated—IIFA Award for Best Background Score; Nominated—Zee Cine Award for Best Background Score; Nominated—Mirchi Music Award for Best Song in Sufi Tradition – "Raanjha Raanjha"; Nominated—Mirchi Music Award for Best Programmed and Arranged Song – "Raanjha Raanjha"
2013	Kadal	Tamil	Norway Tamil Film Festival Award for Best Music Director; Filmfare Award for Best Music Director – Tamil; Vijay Award for Best Music Director; Radio Mirchi Song of the Year – "Nenjukkule"; Behindwoods Gold Medal for Best Music Direction; Nominated—MTV Europe Music Award for Best Indian Act
2015	O Kadhal Kanmani	Tamil	Vikatan Award for Best Music Director iTunes music award for best Indian album iTunes Best Artist of the year- A. R. Rahman iTunes Best selling album of the year- O Kadhal Kanmani; Nominated- Filmfare Award for Best Music Director -Tamil; Nominated- SIIMA Award for Best Music Director -Tamil
2017	Kaatru Veliyidai	Tamil	National Film Award for Best Music Direction; Vikatan Awards For Best Music Director Vijay Award for Best Music Director; Radio City Cine Awards Tamil – Favourite Music Director; Behindwoods Gold Medal for Best Music Direction; Nominated- Filmfare Award for Best Music Director – Tamil; Nominated – SIIMA Award for Best Music Director
2018	Chekka Chivantha Vaanam	Tamil	Nominated- SIIMA Award for Best Music Director Nominated – Filmfare Award for Best Music Director – Tamil; Nominated- SIIMA Award for Best Playback Singer Male
2022	Ponniyin Selvan: I	Tamil	National Film Award for Best Music Direction (Best Background Score); Filmfare Award for Best Music Director – Tamil; Ananda Vikatan Cinema Awards for Best Music Director; Norway Tamil Film Festival Awards for Best Music Director; Nominated - Asian Film Awards for Best Music
2023	Ponniyin Selvan: II	Tamil	
2025	Thug Life	Tamil	

== Notes ==
- A Many of Mani Ratnam's movies are in the Tamil language and are released simultaneously or later in multiple languages, usually Telugu and Hindi.
- B Only the major awards won for Best Music Direction are listed here. Several featured artists from the films have won numerous other awards.
- C Alaipayuthey and O Kadhal Kanmani had Hindi remakes titled Saathiya and OK Jaanu respectively; those were scored by A.R. Rahman but direction credited to his assistant Shaad Ali. Story, screenplay and produced by Mani Ratnam himself.
