= Qutub-E-Kripa =

Group of musicians

Qutub-E-Kripa is a national award-winning ensemble of young musicians of KM Music Conservatory. Qutub-E-Kripa was formed by A. R. Rahman produces outstandingly talented students every year. In order to provide direction and a means to showcase their talent.

They have been co-credited alongside A. R. Rahman for the background scores of films such as 24, O Kadhal Kanmani, Tamasha, OK Jaanu, Kaatru Veliyidai, Mom, Chekka Chivantha Vaanam, Sarkar and 2.0. They have also scored for the Netflix show, Daughters of Destiny.

In 2018, Academy Awards shortlisted Qutub-E-Kripa's three songs "I’ll be Gone", "Have you Ever Wondered" and "We’ll Party All Night" from Raj Thiruselvan-directed film Lake of Fire for the Best Original Song.

== Filmography ==
- Everest (2014)
- O Kadhal Kanmani (2015)
- 24 (2016)
- Cinema Veeran (2017)
- Kaatru Veliyidai (2017)
- Daughters of Destiny (2017)
- Mom (2017)
- Mersal (2017)
- Chekka Chivvantha Vaanam (2018)
- Sarkar (2018)
- 2.0 (2018)
- Le Musk (2019)
- Sarvam Thaala Mayam (2019)
- Bigil (2019)
- Shikara (2020)
- College Kumar (2020)
- Lake of Fire (2020)
- Cobra (2022)
- Ponniyin Selvan (2022)
- Vendhu Thanindhathu Kaadu (2022)
