= A. R. Rahman =

Indian composer and musician (born 1967)

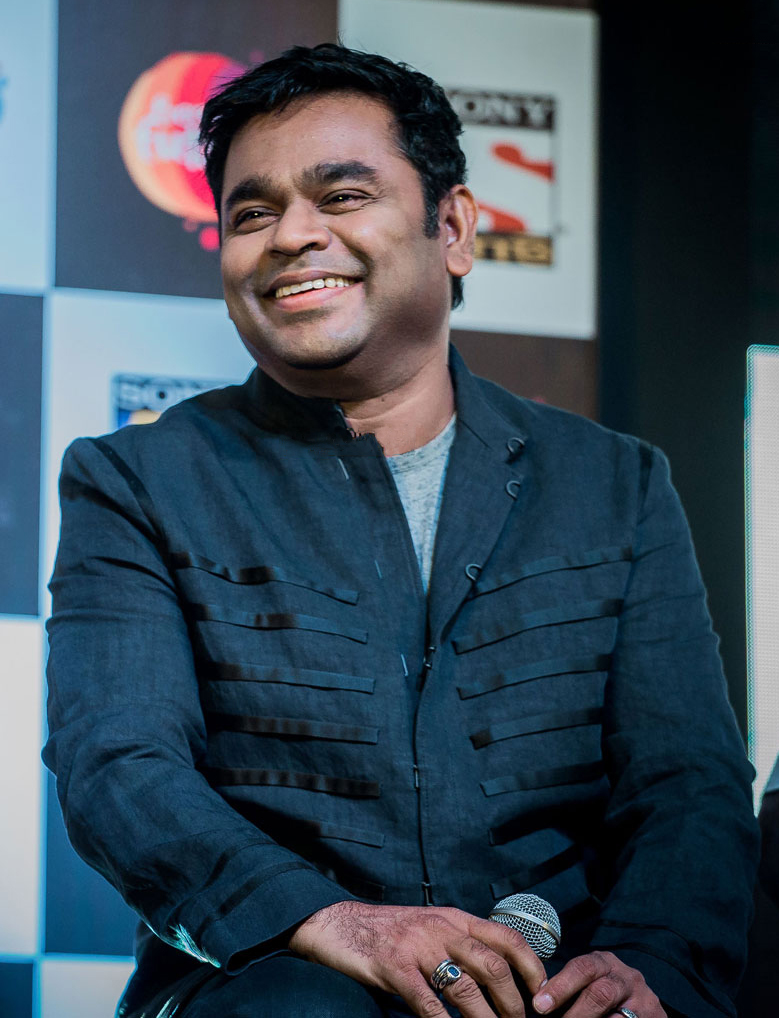
- A. R. Rahman at the Premier Futsal Press Meet, 2016
- Born: Arunachalam Shekhar Dileep Kumar; 6 January 1967 (age 59); Madras, Madras State, India
- Other name: ARR
- Education: Trinity Laban (Classical music)
- Occupations: Record producer; composer; playback singer; songwriter
- Organization: KM Music Conservatory
- Works: Discography; Filmography
- Office: Panchathan Record Inn and AM Studios
- Spouse: Saira Banu (m. 1995; sep. 2024)
- Children: 3, including Ameen and Khatija
- Father: R. K. Shekhar
- Relatives: A. R. Reihana (sister)
- Family: R. K. Shekhar family
- Awards: Full list
- Honours: Padma Shri (2000); Padma Bhushan (2010)
- Musical career
- Also known as: Isai Puyal; Mozart of Madras
- Genres: Electronic music; film score; filmi; hindustani classical; Indian classical; pop; rock; sufi; world music; western classical
- Instruments: Vocals; keyboards; piano; harmonium; percussions; drums; guitar; accordion; harp; synthesizer
- Years active: 1992–present
- Labels: KM Musiq; Sony Music India; T-Series; YRF Music; Sony DADC; Aditya Music; Lahari Music; Universal Music; Eros Music
- Website: arrahman.com Foundation website

Honorary President of Trinity Laban
- Incumbent
- Assumed office December 2024

Allah Rakha Rahman (born A. S. Dileep Kumar; 6 January 1967), also known as ARR, is an Indian music composer, record producer, singer, songwriter, multi-instrumentalist, and philanthropist known for his works in Indian cinema; predominantly in Tamil and Hindi films, with occasional forays in international cinema. He is a recipient of seven National Film Awards, two Academy Awards, two Grammy Awards, a BAFTA Award, a Golden Globe Award, seven Tamil Nadu State Film Awards, fifteen Filmfare Awards, and eighteen Filmfare Awards South. In 2010, the Government of India conferred him with the Padma Bhushan, the nation's third-highest civilian award.

With his in-house studio Panchathan Record Inn, Rahman's film-scoring career began during the early 1990s with the Tamil film Roja. Following that, he went on to score several songs for Tamil language films, including Mani Ratnam's politically charged Bombay, the urban Kaadhalan, Thiruda Thiruda, and S. Shankar's debut film Gentleman. Rahman's score for his first Hollywood film, the comedy Couples Retreat (2009), won the BMI Award for Best Score. His music for Slumdog Millionaire (2008) earned him Best Original Score and Best Original Song (for Jai Ho) at the 81st Academy Awards. He was also awarded Best Compilation Soundtrack Album and Best Song Written for Visual Media at the 2010 Grammy Awards. He is nicknamed "Isai Puyal" (transl. Musical Storm) and "Mozart of Madras".

Rahman has also become a humanitarian and philanthropist, donating and raising money for a number of causes and charities. In 2006, he was honoured by Stanford University for his contributions to global music. In 2008, he received Lifetime Achievement Award from the Rotary Club of Madras. In 2009, he was included on the Time list of the world's 100 most influential people. In 2014, he was awarded an honorary doctorate from Berklee College of Music. He has also received honorary doctorate from Aligarh Muslim University. In 2017, he made his debut as a director and writer for the film Le Musk. In 2024, Rahman was named Honorary President of Trinity Laban.

== Early life ==
Allah Rakha Rahman was born Dileep Kumar in Madras, Tamil Nadu, on 6 January 1967. His father, R. K. Shekhar from a Vellalar family, was a film score composer and conductor for Malayalam films. Rahman began studying piano at age four. He assisted his father in the studio, playing the keyboard.

After his father's death when Rahman was nine years old, the rental of his father's musical equipment provided his family's income. Raised by his mother, Kareema (born Kashturi), Rahman, who was studying in Padma Seshadri Bala Bhavan had to work to support his family, which led to him to routinely miss classes and fail exams. Rahman said that his mother was summoned and was told to take him to the streets of Kodambakkam to beg and not to send him to the school any more.

Rahman attended another school called MCN for a year, and later joined the Madras Christian College Higher Secondary School, where he was admitted for his musical talent and formed a band with his high school classmates. However, after discussing it with his mother, he later dropped out of school to pursue a career as a full-time musician. Rahman was a keyboard player and arranger for bands such as Roots (with childhood friend and percussionist Sivamani, Suresh Peters and John Anthony, JoJo and Raja) and founded the Chennai-based rock group Nemesis Avenue. He mastered the keyboard, piano, synthesiser, harmonium and guitar, and was particularly interested in the synthesiser because it was the "ideal combination of music and technology".

Rahman began his early musical training under Master Dhanraj, and at age 11 began playing in the orchestra of a Malayalam composer (and close friend of his father) M. K. Arjunan. He soon began working with other composers, such as M. S. Viswanathan, Vijaya Bhaskar, Ilaiyaraaja, Ramesh Naidu, Vijay Anand, Hamsalekha and Raj–Koti, accompanied Zakir Hussain, Kunnakudi Vaidyanathan and L. Shankar on world tours and obtained a scholarship from Trinity College London to the Trinity College of Music.

During his early career, Rahman had assisted many music directors in playing the keyboard and synthesiser. One of the notable works includes a Malayalam film, Ramji Rao Speaking released in 1989 where Rahman and Sivamani programmed a song called "Kalikalam" for the music director S. Balakrishnan. Cinematographer Santosh Sivan signed Rahman for his second film Yoddha, a Malayalam film starring Mohanlal and directed by Sivan's brother Sangeeth Sivan that released in September 1992.

=== Conversion to Islam and name change ===
Studying in Madras, Rahman graduated with a diploma in Western classical music from the school. Rahman was introduced to Qadiri tariqa when his younger sister was seriously ill in 1984. His mother was a practising Hindu. At the age of 23, he converted to Islam with the members of his family in 1989.

Rahman also changed his name during this period. In an interview with Karan Thapar, he revealed that he never liked his birth name as it did not resonate with his self-image. According to his biography A. R. Rahman: The Spirit of Music by Nasreen Munni Kabir, a Hindu astrologer suggested the names "Abdul Rahman" and "Abdul Rahim," and Rahman instantly connected with the former. His mother later added "Allah Rakha" (AR) to his name after it came to her in a dream.

== Career ==
=== Soundtracks ===
Rahman initially composed scores for different documentaries and jingles for advertisements and Indian television channels. In 1987 Rahman, then still known as Dileep, composed jingles for a line of watches introduced by Allwyn. He also arranged the jingles for some advertisements that went on to become very popular, including the popular jingle for Titan Watches, in which he used the theme from Mozart's Symphony no.25.

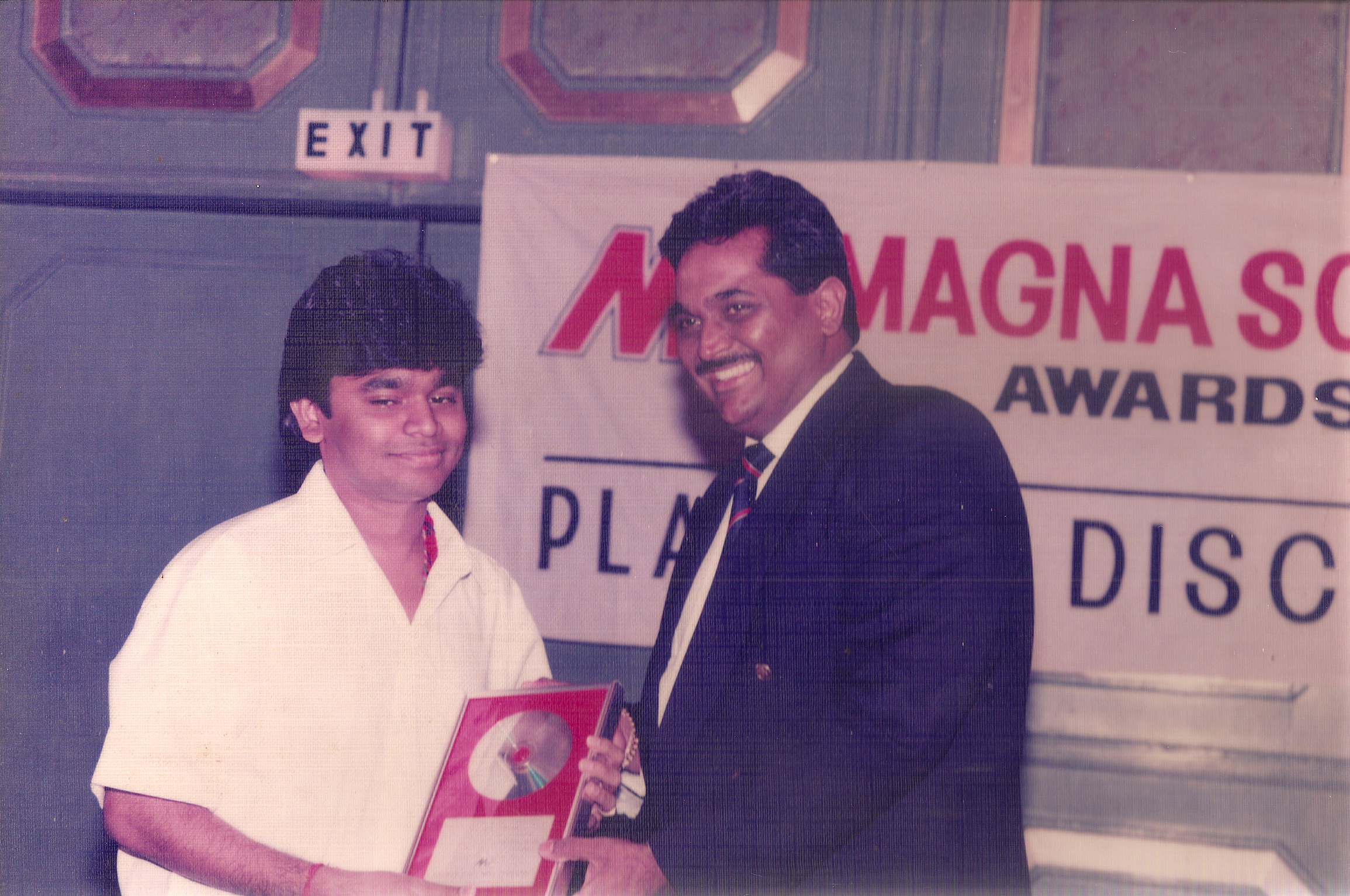
Rahman (left) receiving a platinum award at the MagnaSound Awards; MagnaSound released his first film soundtrack, Roja, in 1992.

In 1992, he was approached by director Mani Ratnam to compose the score and soundtrack for his Tamil film, Roja.

Rahman's film career began in 1992 when he started Panchathan Record Inn, a recording and mixing studio in his backyard. It would become the most-advanced recording studio in India, and arguably one of Asia's most sophisticated and high-tech studios. Cinematographer Santosh Sivan signed Rahman for his second film Yoddha, a Malayalam film starring Mohanlal and directed by Sivan's brother Sangeeth Sivan that released in September 1992.

The following year, Rahman received the National Film Awards (Silver Lotus) award for Best Music Director at the 40th National Film Awards for Roja. The films' score was critically and commercially successful in its original and dubbed versions, led by the innovative theme "Chinna Chinna Aasai". Rahman followed this with successful scores and songs for Tamil–language films for the Chennai film industry, including Ratnam's politically charged Bombay, Thiruda Thiruda and S. Shankar's debut film Gentleman (with its popular dance song, "Chikku Bukku Rayile"), the urban Kaadhalan. Rahman collaborated with director Bharathiraaja on Kizhakku Cheemayile and Karuththamma, producing successful Tamil rural folk-inspired film songs; he also composed for K. Balachander's Duet, which had some memorable Saxophone themes. The 1995 film Indira and romantic comedies Mr. Romeo and Love Birds also drew attention.

Rahman attracted a Japanese audience with Muthu's success there. His soundtracks are known in the Tamil Nadu film industry and abroad for his versatility in combining Western classical music, Carnatic and Tamil traditional and folk-music traditions, jazz, reggae and rock music. The soundtrack for Bombay sold 15 million copies worldwide, and "Bombay Theme" would later reappear in his soundtrack for Deepa Mehta's Fire and a number of compilations and other media. It was featured in the 2002 Palestinian film Divine Intervention and the 2005 Nicolas Cage film, Lord of War. Rangeela, directed by Ram Gopal Varma, was Rahman's Bollywood debut. Successful scores and songs for Dil Se.. and the percussive Taal followed. Sufi mysticism inspired "Chaiyya Chaiyya" from the former film and "Zikr" from his soundtrack album for Netaji Subhas Chandra Bose: The Forgotten Hero (which featured elaborate orchestral and choral arrangements).

Rahman's soundtrack album for the Chennai production Minsara Kanavu won him his second National Film Award for Best Music Direction and a South FilmFare Award for Best Music Direction in a Tamil film in 1997, the latter setting a record of six consecutive wins; he later went on to win the award three consecutive additional times. The musical cues in the soundtrack albums for Sangamam and Iruvar used Carnatic vocals, the veena, rock guitar and jazz. During the 2000s, Rahman composed scores and popular songs for Rajiv Menon's Kandukondain Kandukondain, Alaipayuthey, Ashutosh Gowariker's Swades, ' 'Yuva' ' Rang De Basanti and songs with Hindustani motifs for 2005's Water. Rahman has worked with Indian poets and lyricists such as Javed Akhtar, Gulzar, Vairamuthu and Vaali, and has produced commercially successful soundtracks with directors Mani Ratnam and S. Shankar (Gentleman, Kaadhalan, Indian, Jeans, Mudhalvan, Nayak, Boys, Sivaji, Enthiran, I and 2.0).

In 2005 Rahman expanded his Panchathan Record Inn studio by establishing AM Studios in Kodambakkam, Chennai, creating the most cutting-edge studio in Asia. The following year he launched his own music label, KM Music, with his score for Sillunu Oru Kaadhal. Rahman scored the Mandarin-language film Warriors of Heaven and Earth in 2003 after researching and using Chinese and Japanese classical music, and won the Just Plain Folks Music Organization|Just Plain Folks Music Award For Best Music Album for his score for 2006's Varalaru (God Father). He co-scored Shekhar Kapur's second British film, Elizabeth: The Golden Age, in 2007 and received a Best Composer Asian Film Award nomination at the Hong Kong International Film Festival for his Jodhaa Akbar score. Rahman's music has been sampled for other scores in India, appearing in Inside Man, Lord of War, Divine Intervention and The Accidental Husband.

His score for his first Hollywood film, the 2009 comedy Couples Retreat, won the BMI London Award for Best Score. Rahman's music for 2008's Slumdog Millionaire won a Golden Globe and two Academy Awards (a first for an Asian), and the songs "Jai Ho" and "O... Saya" from its soundtrack were internationally successful. His music on 2008's Bollywood Jaane Tu... Ya Jaane Na was popular with Indian youth; that year, his score and songs for Jodhaa Akbar won critical acclaim, a Best Composer Asian Film Award nomination and IIFA awards for best music direction and score.

In 2010, Rahman composed the original score and songs for the romantic Vinnaithaandi Varuvaayaa, the sci-fi romance Enthiran and Danny Boyle's 127 Hours, composing for the Imtiaz Ali musical Rockstar; the latter's soundtrack was a critical and commercial success. In 2012 Rahman composed for Ekk Deewana Tha and the American drama People Like Us, and collaborated with director Yash Chopra on Jab Tak Hai Jaan. all were positively received. By the end of the year his music for Mani Ratnam's Kadal topped the iTunes India chart for December.

In 2013, Rahman had two releases: Raanjhanaa and Maryan. Both were successful, with the former nominated for a number of awards and the latter the iTunes India Tamil Album of 2013.

The year 2014 was one of the busiest years for Rahman, with him claiming to have worked in 12 films in various languages. While his first release for the year was the Imtiaz Ali's road movie Highway which garnered positive reviews, his very next release was the performance captured animation film Kochadaiiyaan, a Rajinikanth starrer directed by Soundarya Rajinikanth. The film's soundtrack was long-listed at the forthcoming Academy Awards. His next were the scores for the two back to back Hollywood films, Million Dollar Arm and The Hundred Foot Journey, both of which got into the contended list for the original score category nomination at the Oscars.

Then he composed for the period drama Kaaviya Thalaivan teaming up with director Vasanthabalan for the first time. His next release was Shankar's thriller I and K. S. Ravikumar's period action film Lingaa.

=== Background scores ===
His background scores are often characterised by the usage of subtle orchestration and ambient sounds. Rahman often employs contemporary instruments such as guitars, cello, flute, strings, keyboard, Continuum Fingerboard, Harpejji, and santoor, alongside traditional Indian instruments such as shehnai, sitar, mridangam, veena, and tabla to compose his scores.

Some of the films which fetched him appreciations for background scores include Roja, Bombay, Iruvar, Minsara Kanavu, Dil Se.., Taal, Lagaan, The Legend of Bhagat Singh, Swades, Rang De Basanti, Bose: The Forgotten Hero, Guru, Jodhaa Akbar, Raavanan, Vinnaithaandi Varuvaayaa, Rockstar, Enthiran, Kadal, Kochadaiiyaan and I. A. R. Rahman received two Academy Awards for Slumdog Millionaire and two Academy Award nominations for 127 Hours. Recently, his scores for Kochadaiiyaan, Million Dollar Arm and The Hundred-Foot Journey have been nominated in the long list released by Academy of Motion Picture Arts and Sciences. In 2017 his Mersal music's background score has impressed one and all. In 2018, Rahman got national award for the background score of Mom.

Qutub-E-Kripa an ensemble of young musicians of KM Music Conservatory, have been co-credited alongside A. R. Rahman for the background scores of films such as 24, O Kadhal Kanmani, Tamasha, OK Jaanu, Kaatru Veliyidai, Mom, Chekka Chivantha Vaanam, Sarkar and 2.0. They have also scored for the Netflix Show, Daughters of Destiny.

=== Performing and other projects ===
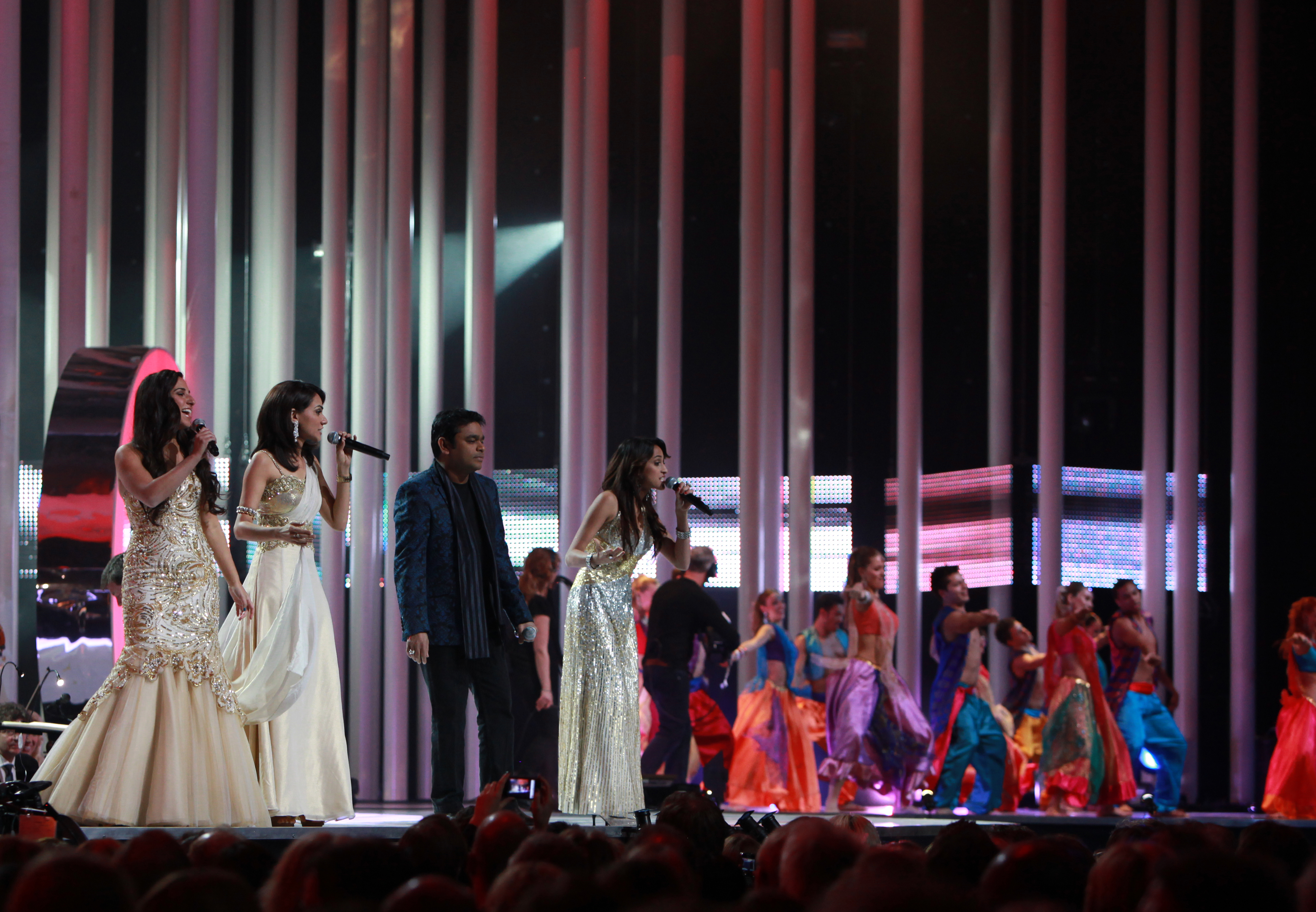
Rahman at the 2010 Nobel Peace Prize Concert

Rahman has also been involved in non-film projects. Vande Mataram, an album of original compositions released for India's 50th anniversary of its independence in 1997, is one of India's best-selling non-film albums. He followed it with an album for the Bharat Bala–directed video Jana Gana Mana, a collection of performances by leading exponents and artists of Indian classical music. Rahman has written advertising jingles and orchestrations for athletic events, television and Internet media, documentaries and short films, frequently using the Czech Film Orchestra and the Chennai Strings Orchestra.

In 1999, Rahman partnered with choreographers Shobana and Prabhu Deva and a Tamil film-dancing troupe to perform with Michael Jackson in Munich, Germany at his Michael Jackson and Friends concert. In 2002 he composed the music for his first stage production, Bombay Dreams, which was commissioned by Andrew Lloyd Webber. The Finnish folk-music band Värttinä collaborated with Rahman on the Toronto production of The Lord of the Rings, and in 2004 he composed "Raga's Dance" for Vanessa-Mae's album Choreography (performed by Mae and the Royal Philharmonic Orchestra).

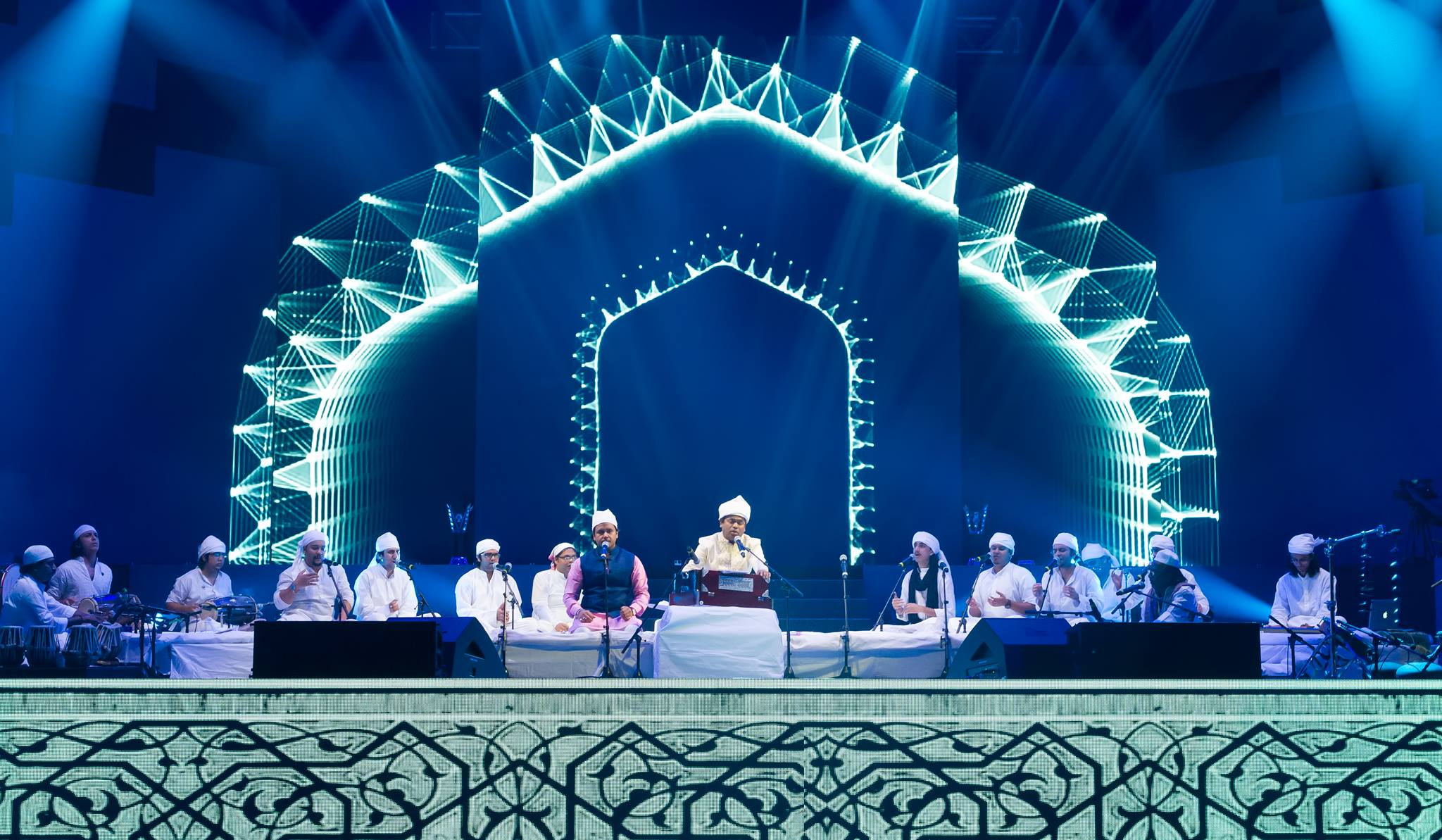
A. R. Rahman at Sufi Concert in Dubai

Since 2004 Rahman has performed three successful world tours before audiences in Singapore, Australia, Malaysia, Dubai, the United Kingdom, Canada, the United States and India, and has been collaborating with Karen David on her upcoming studio album. A two-disc CD, Introducing A. R. Rahman (featuring 25 of his Tamil film-score pieces), was released in May 2006 and his non-film album Connections was released on 12 December 2008. In August 2009 Rahman performed at the Srifort Auditorium in New Delhi in a concert titled A R Rahman Unplugged which kickstarted the golden jubilee celebrations of the National broadcaster Doordarshan. The Minister of Information and Broadcasting of India, Mrs Ambika Soni was the chief guest. Rahman performed at a White House state dinner arranged by US President Barack Obama during an official visit by Indian Prime Minister Manmohan Singh on 24 November 2009.

He is one of over 70 artists on "We Are the World 25 for Haiti", a charity single to raise relief funds in the wake of the 2010 Haiti earthquake. In 2010, Rahman composed "Jai Jai Garavi Gujarat" in honour of the 50th anniversary of the formation of Gujarat State, "Semmozhiyaana Thamizh Mozhiyaam" as part of the World Classical Tamil Conference 2010, and the theme song for the 2010 Commonwealth Games, "Jiyo Utho Bado Jeeto". Rahman began his first world tour, (A. R. Rahman Jai Ho Concert: The Journey Home World Tour) on 11 June 2010 at Nassau Coliseum in New York; 16 cities worldwide were scheduled.

Some of Rahman's notable compositions were performed by the London Philharmonic Orchestra in April 2010. In February 2011 Rahman collaborated with Michael Bolton on Bolton's album, Gems – The Duets Collection, reworking his "Sajna" from Couples Retreat.

On 20 May 2011 Mick Jagger announced the formation of a supergroup, SuperHeavy, with Dave Stewart, Joss Stone, Damian Marley and Rahman; its self-titled album was scheduled for release in September 2011. The album would have Jagger singing on Rahman's composition, "Satyameva Jayate" ("The Truth Alone Triumphs").

In January 2012 the Deutsches Filmorchester Babelsberg announced that it would join KM Music Conservatory musicians for a 100-member concert tour of five Indian cities (Germany and India 2011–2012: Infinite Opportunities), performing Rahman's songs. The marked the centennial of Indian cinema and Babelsberg Studio, the world's oldest film studio.

In Summer 2012 Rahman composed a Punjabi song for the London Olympics opening ceremony, directed by Danny Boyle, part of a medley showcasing Indian influence in the UK. Indian musician Ilaiyaraja's song from the 1981 Tamil-language film Ram Lakshman was also chosen for the medley.

In December 2012 Rahman and Shekhar Kapoor launched Qyuki, a networking site which is a platform for story writers to exchange their thoughts. Cisco invested ₹270 million in the startup, giving it a 17-percent share. Qyuki uses Cisco's cloud infrastructure for the site. On 20 December he released the single "Infinite Love" in English and Hindi, commemorating the last day of the Mayan calendar to spread hope, peace and love. Rahman's 2013 tour, Rahmanishq, was announced on 29 July 2013 in Mumbai. Beginning in Sydney on 24 August, the tour moved to a number of cities in India.

In January 2016, after a long break Rahman performed live in Chennai and for the first time in Coimbatore & Madurai, with a complete Tamil playlist. As the name suggests, Nenje Yezhu (which means rise up) began 2016 with a positive note and with music from the heart. The proceeds of this concert will be used for flood relief in Tamil Nadu and also for creating awareness against cancer, supporting VS Medical Trust outside Chennai.

Rahman released a 19-minute orchestral composition The Flying Lotus in 2017 featuring the demonetisation. This musical piece is an open interpretation of this major stance against black money which also includes Narendra Modi's speech.

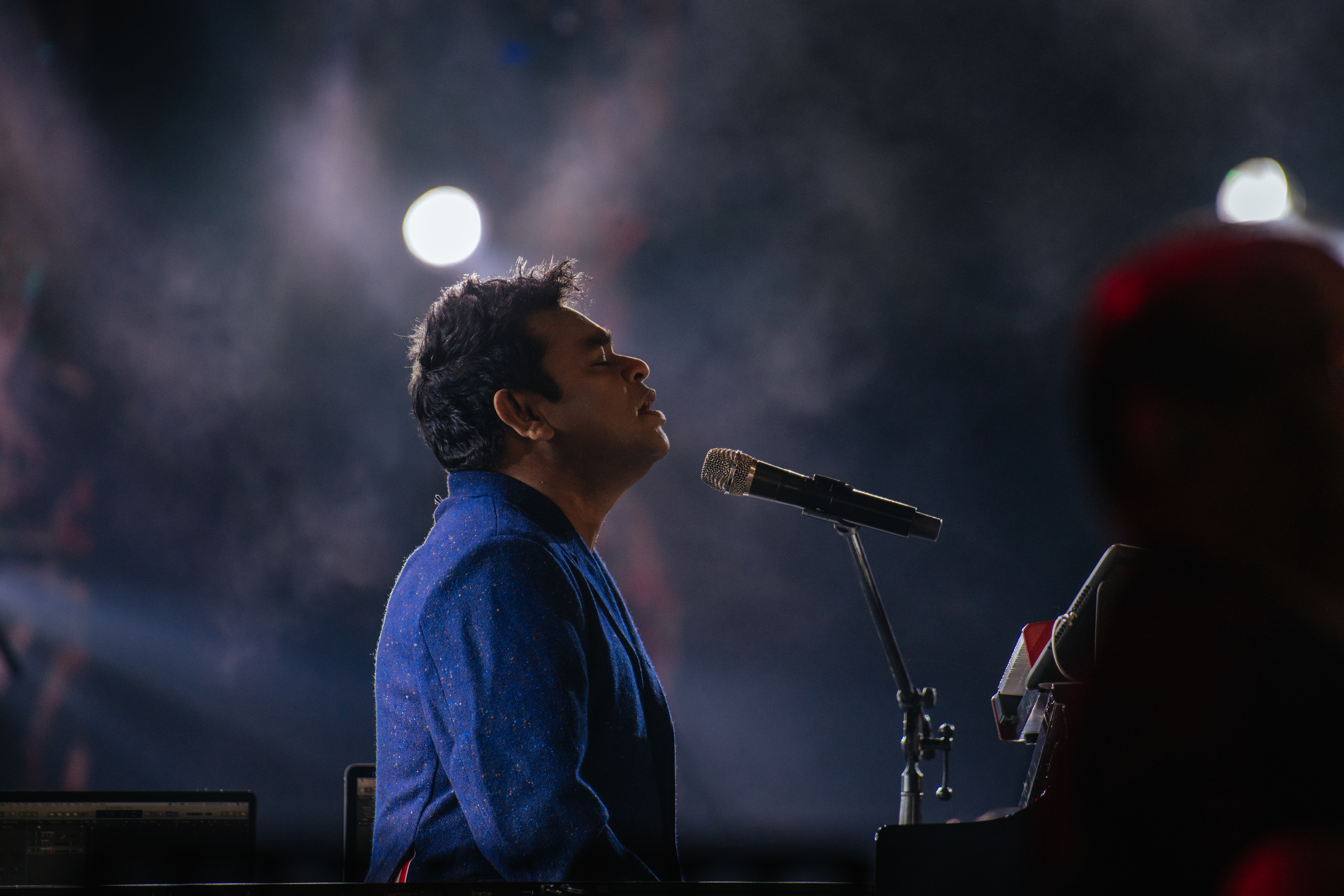
Opening Ceremony Hockey World Cup Bhubaneswar 2018 performance

On 15 August 2018, Rahman appeared as the host in the 5-episode series of Amazon Prime Video titled "Harmony".

Rahman launched India's first YouTube Original, ARRived, which aims to find the best singing talent from across country. The series has 13 episodes and the first episode was uploaded on 7 November 2018. Rahman is the main judge and he is accompanied by Shaan, Vidya Vox and Clinton Cerejo.

On 16 January 2019, Maruti Suzuki India Limited launched NEXA Music, a platform where 24 artists will be picked and mentored by Rahman and Clinton Cerejo to create international music in India.

Rahman also appeared as a judge on The Voice. The show began airing on 3 February 2019 on StarPlus. Rahman partnered with Marvel to compose a promotional track titled "Marvel Anthem" in Hindi, Tamil and Telugu for Avengers: Endgame (2019). Rahman has sung and composed the track spiced up with rap and heavy percussion. The lyrics were written by Nirmika Singh, and MC Heam. The film's team also walked the red carpet and also took a selfie with over 3,500 audience members.

The Irish rock band U2 collaborated with Rahman to release a single, "Ahimsa", in December 2019. The song was named for the Sanskrit word for non-violence, and lyrically was intended to celebrate the ethnical and spiritual diversity in India. Rahman stated that ahimsa requires courage and strength, and that the song is a celebration of non-violence and peace.

In 2026, Rahman composed the single, "Asha Forever", to pay tribute to veteran playback singer Asha Bhosle. The song was launched by the Chief Minister of Maharashtra, Devendra Fadnavis, on the occasion of the singer's 93rd birth anniversary.

== Musical style and influence ==
Skilled in Carnatic music, Western and Hindustani classical music and the Qawwali style of Nusrat Fateh Ali Khan, Rahman is noted for film songs amalgamating elements of these and other genres, layering instruments from different musical idioms in an improvisational style. During the 1980s Rahman recorded monaural arrangements in common with his musical predecessors, K. V. Mahadevan and Vishwanathan–Ramamoorthy. He has also worked as a pianist in Ilaiyaraaja's troupe for hundreds of movies. In later years his methodology changed, as he experimented with the fusion of traditional instruments with new electronic sounds and technology.

Rahman's musical interests and outlook originate in his love of experimentation. His compositions have an auteuristic use of counterpoint, orchestration and the human voice, melding Indian pop music with a unique timbre, form and instrumentation. With this syncretic style and wide-ranging lyrics, the appeal of Rahman's music crosses classes and cultures in Indian society.

His first soundtrack, for Roja, was listed on Time's all-time "10 Best Soundtracks" in 2005. Film critic Richard Corliss said that the composer's "astonishing debut work parades Rahman's gift for alchemizing outside influences until they are totally Tamil, totally Rahman", and his initial global success is attributed to the South Asian diaspora. Music producer Ron Fair considers Rahman "one of the world's great living composers in any medium".

Director Baz Luhrmann said:

I had come to the music of A. R. Rahman through the emotional and haunting score of Bombay and the wit and celebration of Lagaan. But the more of AR's music I encountered the more I was to be amazed at the sheer diversity of styles: from swinging brass bands to triumphant anthems; from joyous pop to West-End musicals. Whatever the style, A. R. Rahman's music always possesses a profound sense of humanity and spirit, qualities that inspire me the most.

Rahman introduced 7.1 surround sound technology to South Indian films. Rahman is one of the best-selling music artists in India, with an estimated 150 million records sold worldwide. On 21 May 2014 Rahman announced that he has partnered with former Black Eyed Peas' Will.i.am to recreate an early popular track 'Urvashi Urvashi' under the new name, 'Birthday'.

== Personal life ==
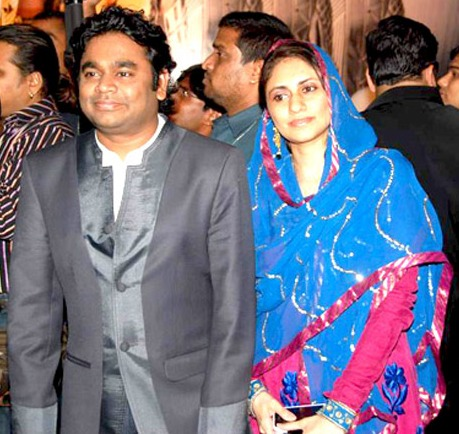
Rahman and his wife Saira Banu at the 2010 soundtrack release of Enthiran in Kuala Lumpur in 2010

Rahman married Saira Banu (not to be confused with Indian former film actress Saira Banu) in 1995; they have three children: Khatija, Raheema and Ameen. Ameen has sung "NaNa" from Couples Retreat, and Khatija has sung "Pudhiya Manidha" from Enthiran. Composer turned actor G. V. Prakash Kumar is the son of Rahman's elder sister, A. R. Reihana. Rahman's younger sister, Fathima, heads his music conservatory in Chennai. The youngest, Ishrath, has a music studio. A.R. Rahman is co-brother to actor Rahman.

Born into a Hindu family, Rahman converted to Islam when he was in his 20s. After the early death of his father, his family experienced difficult times; Sufism influenced his mother, who was a practising Hindu and, eventually, his family. During the 81st Academy Awards ceremony Rahman paid tribute to his mother: "There is a Hindi dialogue, mere pass ma hai, which means 'even if I have got nothing I have my mother here'." He said, "Ellā pugaḻum iṟaivaṉukkē" ("All praise to God" in Tamil, a translation from the Quran) before his speech. In February 2020, Rahman was critiqued for his liberal image after Bangladeshi author Taslima Nasreen raised a question about his daughter wearing a burqa.

In November 2024, A.R. Rahman and Saira Banu announced their separation.

== Philanthropy ==
Rahman is involved with a number of charitable causes. In 2004 he was appointed as the global ambassador of the Stop TB Partnership, a WHO project. Rahman has supported Save the Children India and worked with Yusuf Islam on "Indian Ocean", a song featuring a-ha keyboard player Magne Furuholmen and Travis drummer Neil Primrose. Proceeds from the song went to help orphans in Banda Aceh who were affected by the 2004 Indian Ocean Tsunami. He produced the single "We Can Make It Better" by Don Asian with Mukhtar Sahota.

In 2008 Rahman opened the KM Music Conservatory with an audio-media education facility to train aspiring musicians in vocals, instruments, music technology and sound design. The conservatory (with prominent musicians on staff and a symphony orchestra) is located near his studio in Kodambakkam, Chennai and offers courses at several levels. Violinist L. Subramaniam is on its advisory board. Several of Rahman's proteges from the studio have scored feature films. In 2009, he founded Sunshine Orchestra with a vision to introduce India's first symphony orchestra where economically and socially deprived children get free music education by the KM Music Conservatory. He composed the theme music for a 2006 short film for The Banyan to aid poor women in Chennai.

In 2008 Rahman and percussionist Sivamani created a song, "Jiya Se Jiya", inspired by the Free Hugs Campaign and promoted it with a video filmed in a number of Indian cities for a cause. In 2017, he announced one heart foundation which would support people from music industry. Rahman announced Ta Futures, a collaborative culture project that would curate and celebrate the sounds of Tamil Nadu.

While this idea initially started off like a city symphony project where we were looking at capturing the sounds of the city, I wanted to make it more participatory. In children, particularly, I want it to trigger a whole different thought process as this is not about film music or film stars and I want them to create and compose their future

- Rahman on announcing Ta Futures project on Chennai

In 2019, Rahman performed a Sufi Benefit Concert at the annual New York gala of Pratham, one of the largest non-governmental organisations in India, which focuses on the provision of quality education to India's underprivileged children. Rahman and his ensemble performed the full dinner concert on a pro-bono basis. Afterward, he wrote on Twitter that his "long time dream of performing #Sufimusic for human causes came true" and thanked attendees for their respect and generosity.

== Filmography ==
=== As an actor ===
Year	Title	Role	Language	Notes
2002	Kadhal Virus	Himself	Tamil	Cameo
2019	Bigil	Himself	Tamil	Cameo in "Singappenney" song
2022	Aaraattu	Himself	Malayalam	Cameo in "Mukkala Muqabla" recreated song
2023	Maamannan	Himself	Tamil	Cameo in "Jigu Jigu Rail" Song
2024	Ayalaan	Himself	Tamil	Cameo in "Maanja Nee" Promo Song

=== As producer, writer and director ===
Year	Title	Credited as			Notes
Year	Title	Producer	Writer	Director	Notes
2020	Atkan Chatkan	Yes	No	No	
2021	99 Songs	Yes	Yes	No	
2022	Le Musk	Yes	Yes	Yes	

=== As performer ===
- One Heart (2017)

=== Music videos ===
Year	Title	Director
1997	"Maa Tujhe Salaam"	Bharatbala
2007	"Pray for Me Brother"	Bharatbala
2007	"One Love"	Owais Husain
2008	"Jiya Se Jiya"	Kanika Myer
2009	"Vellai Pookkal"	Mani Ratnam
2009	"Jai Ho! (You Are My Destiny)"	Thomas Kloss
2009	"Beautiful"	
2010	"Semmozhiyaana Tamizh Mozhiyaam"	Gautham Vasudev Menon
2010	"Jiyo Utho Bado Jeeto"	Bharatbala
2011	"Changing Seasons"	Mani Ratnam, John Warner
2011	"If I Rise"	
2011	"Miracle Worker"	Paul Boyd
2011	"Satyameva Jayathe"	Paul Boyd
2012	"Infinite Love"	Paul Boyd
2014	"Kismat Se"	
2018	"Jai Hind India"	
2019	"Sago"	Amith Krishnan
2019	"Marvel Anthem"	Punit Malhotra
2019	"Singappenney"	Atlee
2019	"For You My Love"	Guneet Monga
2020	"You Got Me"	Uma-Gaiti AR Rahman ft Nexa Music Lab Winners- Nisa, Heat Sink, Jonathan, Pelenuo & Simetri
2021	"Rihaayi De" Promotional Music Video - Mimi	Rajesh Bhatia
2022	Firdaus Sessions by A.R. Rahman featuring Dana Dajani - Spring	Rajesh Bhatia
2022	Untold Stories Firdaus Sessions A. R. Rahman featuring Seeta Qasemi	Rajesh Bhatia
2022	Firdaus Sessions by A.R. Rahman featuring Nirmika	Rajesh Bhatia
2022	Firdaus Studio Sessions by A. R. Rahman - Pain featuring Dana Dajani & Gouri Viravalli	Rajesh Bhatia
2022	Moopilla Thamizhe Thaaye (Tamil Anthem)	Amith Krishnan

=== Television ===
- Everest (2014)
- Harmony With A. R. Rahman (2014)
- Syamasundara (Asianet theme song) (1994)
- Sa Re Ga Ma Pa Challenge (2009)
- The Kapil Sharma Show (2016)
- Sa Re Ga Ma Pa L'il Champs 2017 (2017)
- The Voice as Super Guru
- Super Singer
- Nayanthara: Beyond the Fairytale

== Awards ==
A seven-time National Film Award winner and recipient of six Tamil Nadu State Film Awards, he has fifteen Filmfare Awards and sixteen Filmfare Awards South for his music. Rahman has received a Kalaimamani from the Government of Tamil Nadu for excellence in the field of music, musical-achievement awards from the governments of Uttar Pradesh and Madhya Pradesh and a Padma Shri from the Government of India.

In 2006, he received an award from Stanford University for his contributions to global music. The following year, Rahman entered the Limca Book of Records as "Indian of the Year for Contribution to Popular Music". He received the 2008 Lifetime Achievement Award from the Rotary Club of Madras. In 2009, for his Slumdog Millionaire score, Rahman won the Broadcast Film Critics Association Award, the Golden Globe Award for Best Original Score, the BAFTA Award for Best Film Music and two Academy Awards (Best Original Score and Best Original Song, the latter shared with Gulzar) at the 81st Academy Awards.

He has received honorary doctorates from Middlesex University, Aligarh Muslim University, Anna University in Chennai and Miami University in Ohio. The composer has won two Grammy Awards: Best Compilation Soundtrack Album and Best Song Written for Visual Media. Rahman received the Padma Bhushan, India's third-highest civilian honour, in 2010.

His work in 127 Hours won him Golden Globe, BAFTA, and two Academy Award nominations (Best Original Music Score and Best Original Song) in 2011. Rahman is an Honorary Fellow of the Trinity College of Music.

On 24 October 2014 Rahman was awarded an honorary doctorate from Berklee College of Music during a concert paying tribute to his music featuring an international cast of students. Upon receiving his award he commented that being honoured by Berklee illustrates how his life has come full circle, as at the start of his career, he had planned to study at Berklee before being offered the opportunity to score Roja. During his 7 May 2012 acceptance speech of his honorary doctorate from Miami University in Ohio, Rahman mentioned that he received a Christmas card from the family of the President of the United States and an invitation to dinner at the White House. A street was named in his honour in Markham, Ontario, Canada in November 2013.

On 4 October 2015, the government of Seychelles named A. R. Rahman Cultural Ambassador for Seychelles in appreciation of the "invaluable services contributed to enhance Seychelles".

In January 2018, he was appointed as the Brand Ambassador of the Sikkim government. A.R. Rahman will promote and project the state's achievements nationally and globally. Rahman was honoured with the Pride of Indian Music award at the first Zee Cine Awards Tamil, held on 4 January 2020 in Chennai.

The UK-based world-music magazine Songlines named him one of "Tomorrow's World Music Icons" in August 2011. For years, he has been regularly listed one among The 500 Most Influential Muslims in the world.

On 17 November 2024, Rahman received the XTIC Award for Innovation in recognition of his VR film Le Musk. The award was presented at IIT-Madras.

== Sales ==
The following table lists the sales of A. R. Rahman's top-selling soundtrack albums in India.

Year	Film	Sales	Notes
1992	Roja	30,00,000	
1993	Gentleman	3,00,000	
1995	Bombay	150,00,000	
1995	Rangeela	32,00,000	
1995	Humse Hai Muqabla	25,00,000	
1995	Muthu	4,00,000	
1996	Indian	24,00,000	
1997	Sapnay	25,00,000	
1997	Daud	20,00,000	
1997	Vande Mataram (album)	15,00,000	
1998	Dil Se..	45,00,000	.
1998	Jeans	18,00,000	
1999	Taal	40,00,000	
1999	Padayappa	7,00,000	
1999	Mudhalvan	3,00,000	
2000	Fiza	25,00,000	
2000	Alaipayuthey	6,00,000	
2000	Kandukondain Kandukondain	4,00,000	
2000	Rhythm	3,50,000	
2001	Lagaan	28,00,000	
2001	Nayak: The Real Hero	14,00,000	
2002	Saathiya	20,00,000	
2004	Swades	13,00,000	
2004	Kisna: The Warrior Poet	12,00,000	
2005	Rang De Basanti	19,00,000	
2006	Guru	11,50,000	
2007	Sivaji	2,48,000	
2008	Ghajini	19,00,000	
2008	Jaane Tu... Ya Jaane Na	15,00,000	
2008	Jodhaa Akbar	11,00,000	
2010	Puli	7,60,000	
Known album sales	—N/a	67,008,000	—N/a

== Biographies ==
- Nasreen Munni Kabir (2011). A. R. Rahman: The Spirit of Music. Om Books International. ISBN 978-93-80070-14-8.
- Mathai, Kamini (2009). A. R. Rahman: The Musical Storm. Viking Press. ISBN 978-06-70083-71-8.

== See also ==
- KM Music Conservatory
- Panchathan Record Inn and AM Studios
- Qutub-E-Kripa
- Sunshine Orchestra
- List of films directed by Mani Ratnam featuring A. R. Rahman
- List of Indian Golden Globe Award winners and nominees
- List of Indian Academy Award winners and nominees

== Bibliography ==
- Allen, John; Uck Lun Chun; Allen Chun; Ned Rossiter; Brian Shoesmith (2004). Refashioning Pop Music in Asia. USA: Routledge. ISBN 978-0-7007-1401-8.
- Arnold, Alison (2000). The Garland Encyclopedia of World Music. Taylor & Francis. ISBN 978-0-8240-4946-1.
- Brégeat, Raïssa (1995). Indomania: le cinéma indien des origines à nos jours (in French). Paris: Cinémathèque française. p. 133. ISBN 978-2-900596-14-2.
- "Cinemaya 1998". Cinemaya (39–41). New Delhi: 9. 1998. ISSN 0970-8782. OCLC 19234070.
- Chaudhuri, Shohini (2005). "Cinema of South India and Sri Lanka". Contemporary World Cinema: Europe, the Middle East, East Asia and South Asia. Edinburgh: Edinburgh University Press. ISBN 0-7486-1799-X.
- Cowie, Peter (1994). Variety International Film Guide 1995 (31st ed.). London/Hollywood. p. 204. ISBN 978-0-600-58516-9. OCLC 221419104.
- "Cinemaya 1998". Cinemaya (39–41). New Delhi: 9. 1998. ISSN 0970-8782. OCLC 19234070.
- Eur, Andy Gregory (2002). "A. R. Rahman". The International Who's Who in Popular Music 2002. Routledge. ISBN 978-1-85743-161-2.
- Ganti, Tejaswini (2004). Bollywood: A Guidebook to Popular Hindi Cinema. Routledge. ISBN 0-415-28854-1.
- Ramaswamy, Vijaya (2007). Historical Dictionary of the Tamils. Michigan: The Scarecrow Press. ISBN 978-0-8108-5379-9.
- Shepherd, John (2005). Continuum encyclopaedia of popular music of the world. Vol. 3–7. London, New York: Continuum. pp. 80–81. ISBN 0-8264-6321-5. OCLC 444486924.
- Slobin, Mark; Gregory Booth; Joseph Getter; B. Balasubrahmaniyan (2008). "Tamil Film Music: Sound and Significance". Global soundtracks: worlds of film music. USA: Wesleyan University Press. ISBN 978-0-8195-6881-6.
- Terska Ciecko, Anne (2006). Contemporary Asian Cinema: Popular culture in a Global Frame. Berg: Berg Publishers. ISBN 1-84520-237-6.
- Todd Titon, Jeff; Linda Fujie; David Locke; David P. McAllester (2005). "India/South India". Worlds of Music: An Introduction to the Music of the World's Peoples. USA: Thomson Shirmer. ISBN 978-0-534-62757-7.
- Todd Titon, Jeff (2009). "India/South India". Worlds of Music: An Introduction to the Music of the World's Peoples (5th ed.). USA: Schirmer Cengage Learning. ISBN 978-0-534-59539-5.
- Velayutham, Selvaraj (2008). Tamil Cinema: The Cultural Politics of India's Other Film Industry. Routledge. ISBN 978-0-415-39680-6.
- Vishwanathan, T.; Matthew Harp-Allen (2004). Music in South India: The Karṇāṭak Concert Tradition and Beyond: Experiencing Music, Expressing Culture. USA: Oxford University Press. ISBN 978-0-19-514591-5.
