= Sunshine Orchestra =

Ambitious project

- Type of project: Symphony orchestra
- Location: Chennai, Tamil Nadu
- Founder: A. R. Rahman
- Country: India
- Established: 2008
- Status: Active
- Website: Sunshine Orchestra from the Foundation website

Sunshine Orchestra is a project by the A. R. Rahman by his foundation aiming to put an Indian symphony orchestra on the world map. It provides free musical training for socially and economically deprived children with an aptitude in music through the KM Music Conservatory. Srinivasa Murthy is the mentor and conductor for the orchestra. The first class of the Sunshine Orchestra began in 2009.

Sunshine Orchestra has played for many events and films. The Sunshine Orchestra also plays for A. R. Rahman's live concerts.

== Discography ==
- Beyond the Clouds (2017 film)
- O Kadhal Kanmani
- Mom(film)
- Mersal (film)
- Sachin: A Billion Dreams
- Sarkar (2018 film)
- Lingaa
- Tere Ishk Mein - 2026
