= Le Musk =

- First Look Poster
- Directed by: A. R. Rahman
- Written by: A. R. Rahman; Saira Rahman
- Screenplay by: Gurachi Phoenix
- Produced by: A. R. Rahman
- Starring: Nora Arnezeder; Guy Burnet; Munirih Grace; Mariam Zohrabyan
- Cinematography: Gianni Giannelli
- Edited by: Anand Kishore
- Music by: A. R. Rahman
- Production companies: Ideal Entertainment; KM Musiq; Intel; Zilvermeer Production; Thenandal Studio Limited
- Release date: 27 April 2017
- Running time: 37 minutes
- Country: India
- Language: English

Le Musk is a 2017 Indian virtual reality thriller film written, directed and co-produced by film composer A. R. Rahman. The film stars Nora Arnezeder, Guy Burnet, Munirih Grace and Mariam Zohrabyan.

A preview of Le Musk was shown 27 April 2017 at the ‘NAB’, Las Vegas in a room with multi-sensory 'Positron Voyager' VR motion platform. At 72nd Cannes Film Festival, Rahman unveiled 'Scent of a song' from the film.

== Plot ==
The film follows the journey of an orphaned Armenian child, full-time heiress and part-time musician, who grows up to be a diva on a mission. All through, she has one constant companion – the lingering Muskan scent. However, her life takes a dramatic turn when she receives an anonymous message, which brings back her mysterious past.

== Cast ==
- Nora Arnezeder as Juliet
- Guy Burnet
- Munirih Grace
- Mariam Zohrabyan
- Edoardo Landolfi

== Production ==
=== Development ===
In 2015, A. R. Rahman was planning to create a theatre with projections all around and scent added to it, after being suggested by his wife Saira to make a film on perfumes. Three months later, someone gave Rahman a virtual reality gear which prompted him and his wife to make a virtual reality film based on perfumes. In order to blend the olfactory element in his film, Rahman got in touch with Grace Boyle, who is the founder director of Feelies, a London based company that has developed the technology to disperse scent during a film.

=== Filming ===
The entire film was shot in Rome in a span of 13 days using a pair of Jaunt ONE cameras, with each of them being fitted with 24 camera sensors so as to capture 8K quality video.
