= Kaatru Veliyidai =

2017 film by Mani Ratnam

- Theatrical release poster
- Directed by: Mani Ratnam
- Written by: Mani Ratnam
- Produced by: Mani Ratnam
- Starring: Karthi; Aditi Rao Hydari
- Cinematography: Ravi Varman
- Edited by: A. Sreekar Prasad
- Music by: Songs: A. R. Rahman; Score: A. R. Rahman; Qutub-E-Kripa
- Production company: Madras Talkies
- Distributed by: Sri Thenandal Films
- Release date: 7 April 2017
- Running time: 140 minutes
- Country: India
- Language: Tamil

Kaatru Veliyidai (transl. Amidst the air) is a 2017 Indian Tamil-language romantic war film, produced, written and directed by Mani Ratnam. Made under the Madras Talkies banner, it features music composed by A. R. Rahman, cinematography by Ravi Varman and editing by A. Sreekar Prasad. The film stars Karthi and Aditi Rao Hydari, with Lalitha, Rukmini Vijayakumar, Delhi Ganesh and RJ Balaji and Shraddha Srinath playing other pivotal roles. Set against the backdrop of the Kargil War of 1999, the film narrates the story of an Indian Air Force pilot who recalls his romance with a doctor in the lead up to the war, while being kept as a prisoner of war at a jail in Rawalpindi, Pakistan. It marked Aditi's comeback and Shraddha's debut in Tamil cinema.

Principal photography of the film commenced in July 2016, with the shoot taking place in Ooty, Hyderabad, Ladakh, Chennai and Belgrade, before being completed in January 2017. The film was released worldwide on 7 April 2017 along with a Telugu dubbed version titled Cheliyaa. The film won two National Film Awards at the 65th National Film Awards: Best Music Direction for A. R. Rahman and Best Female Playback Singer for Shashaa Tirupati.

== Plot ==
The film opens in medias res during the 1999 Kargil War, where an Indian Air Force (IAF) MiG-21 fighter aircraft is shot down by a Pakistani surface-to-air missile. The pilot, Squadron Leader Varun "VC" Chakrapani, ejects safely but lands in enemy territory. He is promptly captured by the Pakistan Army, imprisoned as a Prisoner of War (POW) at a detention facility in Rawalpindi, and subjected to severe custodial torture. To survive the psychological trauma of solitary confinement, VC reminisces about his stormy romance with Leela Abraham.

Months earlier, Leela arrives in Srinagar to work as a civilian doctor at the military hospital. VC, a highly skilled but fiercely arrogant and reckless pilot, suffers a severe accident during an unauthorized joyride and is brought to the hospital in critical condition. In the absence of the senior duty doctor, Leela treats his injuries and nurses him back to health. Upon his recovery, VC leaves the hospital clandestinely without acknowledging her, aided by his colleague, army doctor Illyaas Hussain. When a frustrated Leela confronts Illyaas, he arranges for her to attend an Air Force social gathering, where VC charms her and invites her to the local flying club. To apologize for his abrupt departure, VC takes her for a flight, during which he learns that Leela is the younger sister of his late course pilot, Ravi Abraham, who died in a training crash that VC was originally scheduled to fly.

The two quickly develop a passionate relationship, but VC's deeply rooted chauvinistic and volatile personality soon fractures their bond. During a multi-month deployment to the Leh military base, Leela visits him to see the crash site where her brother died. While there, she begins to recognize his toxic need for absolute psychological dominance. Back at the Srinagar base, during a gathering with fellow officers, Leela voices her perspective on a strategic military situation. Enraged by her independence, VC publicly humiliates her, asserting a regressive view on gender roles. Though Leela fiercely defends gender equality and walks out, VC later pacifies her by contrasting her noble profession of saving lives with his own destructive role as a fighter pilot. He abruptly takes her to a local registrar's office to log a marriage application, only to leave for an official assignment in Delhi the following morning, completely disregarding the appointment and deeply upsetting her.

Leela subsequently discovers she is pregnant. When she informs VC, his visible hesitation prompts her to declare that she will raise the child alone, refusing to rely on his unpredictable affection. Shortly after, following the death of Leela's grandfather, VC visits her ancestral home, where Leela's father openly displays his hostility toward him. Exhausted by his emotional manipulation, Leela informs VC that she is resigning from her post and permanently leaving Srinagar. VC begs for a final chance at reconciliation just before he is deployed to active combat in the Kargil War, where his aircraft is subsequently shot down.

Back in the present, VC and two fellow Indian POWs orchestrate a high-stakes escape from the Rawalpindi prison. They endure grueling physical hardships to reach the Pakistan-Afghanistan border, where they are initially detained by Afghan border authorities. Following a brief interrogation, they are transferred to the Indian Embassy in Kabul and safely repatriated to India. VC receives a decorated welcome from his unit and is reinstated into active IAF duty.

VC immediately launches a relentless search for Leela, eventually tracking her down three years later at a rural medical camp. He expresses deep remorse, explaining that his time in captivity broke his arrogance and transformed him into a better man. He is astonished to discover that Leela has given birth to their daughter, Rohini. When Leela asks if the child resembles her parents, an ecstatic VC realizes he has been fully forgiven. Leela admits she refrained from contacting him out of fear that his past volatility would reject them. The family emotionally reunites, with Leela peacefully transferring the responsibility of raising Rohini to a redeemed VC.

== Cast ==
- Karthi as Squadron Leader Varun Chakrapani aka VC, an air force officer who is arrested by Pakistan army and later released
- Aditi Rao Hydari as Dr. Leela Abraham, Varun's love interest (Voice dubbed by Krithika Nelson)
- K. P. A. C. Lalitha as Achamma
- Uday Mahesh as Chakrapani, Father of Varun Chakrapani
- Rukmini Vijayakumar as Dr. Nidhi, Leela's best friend
- Shraddha Srinath as Girija Kapoor, Varun's first girlfriend (cameo appearance)
- RJ Balaji as Dr. Illyaas Hussain, Leela's friend
- Delhi Ganesh as Col. Mithran, Leela's grandfather
- Sivakumar Ananth as Girish Reddy
- Vipin Sharma as lawyer Prakash Abraham, Leela's father
- Mir Sarwar as Muzaffar Khan
- Harish Raj as Madhusoodhanan Pillai, VC's brother
- Vaiyapuri as VC's Friend
- Dhyana Madan as Rohini
- Supyarde Singh as VC's sister-in-Law
- Indranil Ghosh

== Production ==
=== Development ===
After shelving a multi-cast project featuring Karthi and Dulquer Salmaan in the lead roles during December 2015, it was reported in the media that Mani Ratnam would instead work on a new film retaining Karthi as the lead actor and A. R. Rahman as the music composer and Ravi Varman as cinematographer. In February 2016, Karthi confirmed that he had signed on to play the lead role and would collaborate with the director twelve years after having worked with him as an assistant during the making of Aayutha Ezhuthu (2004). Mani Ratnam requested Karthi to lose weight through the CrossFit program and learn the basics of flying to portray the lead character of a pilot. He prepared for the role by understanding more about fighter pilots through a wing commander friend including Varthaman and analysed their typical fitness routine their body language. Karthi also was asked to sport a clean-shaven look like a part of his role and did so for the first time in his acting career. The start of the film was delayed as the team wanted to wait for a better climate, before beginning the shoot in Kashmir, while the team also chose to wait for Karthi to finish his commitments for the production of Kaashmora (2016). Sai Pallavi successfully auditioned for the leading female role of a doctor in the project and was signed on to make her debut as a lead actress in the Tamil film industry through the project. However, in April 2016, Mani Ratnam felt that the character had to be older and opted to leave Sai Pallavi out of the project, later replacing her with Aditi Rao Hydari. Hydari participated in Tamil lessons prior to the film's shoot, in order to improve her understanding of the script. She also worked in a hospital for a few days in order to get a better understanding of her role as a doctor.

Mani Ratnam and his team began location hunting in April 2016 to seek out replacements to resemble Kashmir and scouted areas including Himachal Pradesh, Kerala, Kodaikanal, Ooty and Coonoor. Meanwhile, Mani Ratnam also worked closely with music composer A. R. Rahman and lyricist Vairamuthu in finalizing seven songs for the film during the pre-production period. The rights to Faith Johnson's book Four Miles to Freedom was also bought by the team, as they looked to draw inspiration from the real-life incidents of Dilip Parulkar's escape from a Pakistani jail in 1971. Actors RJ Balaji and Delhi Ganesh joined the cast of the film in July 2016, while actress Shraddha Srinath revealed that she would feature in a small role as a brigadier's daughter. Kannada actor Harish Raj and Hindi actor Vipin Sharma also joined the first schedule of the film, making their debuts in the Tamil film industry. Likewise, actresses Lalitha and Rukmini Vijayakumar were signed up for roles during the film's initial schedule. The film's first look poster was revealed in early July 2016, with the title of Kaatru Veliyidai, inspired by a poem by Subramania Bharati, officially announced.

=== Filming ===
The shoot of the film began in early July 2016 in Nilgiris, Ooty with a twenty-day schedule featuring Karthi and Aditi Rao Hydari. The location was chosen to show Kashmir on screen, as the latter's climate had made conducting shooting there difficult. Art director Amaran and production designer Sharmishta Roy worked together on designing the set during the first schedule, choosing to enhance existing backgrounds rather than to create lavish sets. The team regularly shot scenes from sunrise onwards, in order to ensure that the film progressed quickly. A second schedule for the film took place in Hyderabad during October 2016, lasting a period of ten days. The team then moved to Leh and the surrounding areas of Ladakh for a third schedule lasting fifteen days, with action sequences choreographed by Sham Kaushal being filmed. In late November 2016, the team moved to shoot scenes in, Siberia and the surrounding snow-capped mountainous regions after they were denied permission to shoot action sequences involving aircraft in North India. During the ten-day schedule, the team also shot a romantic song in the snowy backdrop choreographed by Brindha. The shoot was concluded in mid-January 2017, with the team announcing that the post-production phase would take a couple of months.

== Release ==
The film had a theatrical release on 7 April 2017 in approximately 1500 screens worldwide. Kaatru Veliyidai was dubbed into Telugu as Cheliyaa which was also theatrically released simultaneously along with the original version. Sri Venkateswara Creations bought the Telugu dubbing rights for the film. While Sri Thenandal Films released the film throughout Tamil Nadu. Rights for Kerala was acquired by Sibu Thameens, while Arun Pandian acquired the rest of India rights under his company A&P Groups.

== Reception ==
Upon release, Kaatru Veliyidai received mixed reviews; though critics predominantly praised the performance of Hydari along with Rahman's music and Ravi Varman's cinematography, they criticised Mani Ratnam's screenplay. Baradwaj Rangan of Film Companion gave the film a high score of 3.5 out of 5 stars, writing "as a movie, Kaatru Veliyidai leaves you wanting, but as cinema, very little can come close to it". Rangan added "like some of Mani Ratnam’s recent films, Kaatru Veliyidai feels abstracted" and that the "director is in his mature phase" with "a little less obvious, little more complicated version of storytelling". Anupama Subramaniam of the Deccan Chronicle wrote "Mani Ratnam, known for his romantic tales with a different note, surprises you with a fresh angle again", noting that it was "a poetic romance that is worth experiencing", while drawing particular praise for the performances of Karthi and Aditi Rao Hydari. A critic from DNA India noted that the film "does not disappoint" and that "to say that Mani portrays the lovers’ intense passion with a painter's bold and indelible strokes would be no exaggeration", while similarly Rediff.com's Divya Nair called the film a "beautiful romance". Malini Mannath of The New Indian Express wrote that "Kaatru Veliyidai is visual treat where roses overpower guns" and that despite a few glitches, it is a "love poem on celluloid". Kaveree Bamzai wrote for dailyo that "Few directors understand women as well as Mani Ratnam. He understands they are complicated, vulnerable, strong, powerful, independent and submissive at the same time. But it is in his writing of Varun that Mani Ratnam shows real spunk. Kaatru Veliyidai may not be Mani Ratnam's best, but it beats Bollywood." Tanul Thakur of thewire.in wrote in his analysis that "Kaatru Veliyidai's portrayal of toxic masculinity through the lens of a successful love story is much more intelligent and unsettling than it lets on."

Sify's reviewer also praised the film stating "it is an experience you must enjoy", stating "if you like beautiful, intimate, playful, passionate love story in typical Mani Ratnam style then Kaatru Veliyidai is bang on". Vishal Menon of The Hindu wrote "there are reasons why Kaatru Veliyidai is certainly no classic", "but when you leave the theatre with a lump in your throat, you remember how your love for this director doesn’t arise merely because he makes you smile — he does so much more than that". Karthik Kumar of Hindustan Times called the film "an underwhelming love saga", adding "visually, Kaatru Veliyidai is beautiful, beyond anyone’s imagination" but the film "does not move you emotionally". Suganth of the Times of India noted "the leads have charm, and try their best to make us care, but we are never as emotionally invested in the fate of VC and Leela as we should be", though wrote "the film is saved to an extent by the technical proficiency on display — right from Ravi Varman’s lush visuals to Rahman’s peppy score and Sharmishta Roy’s realistic sets, the film is a treat technically". The Bangalore Mirror's critic wrote "Kaatru Veliyidai eventually is one of Mani Ratnam’s weaker films and that’s disappointing, thankfully it is not a disaster like Kadal". Likewise, a critic from The Indian Express wrote "Kaatru Veliyidai flunks the test" and "what we are left with is a few moments in which Hydari impresses, the spectacular scenery, shot by Ravi Varman, and a couple of rousing song-and-dance numbers, powered by A R Rahman’s score".

=== Box office ===
The film took a strong opening at the Tamil Nadu box office, grossing over ₹120 million during the first weekend and performed exceptionally well in Chennai, Coimbatore and Chengalpattu. However mixed reviews from social media and the release of three new Tamil films the following weekend led to the number of shows being screened to drop substantially in the second week of its theatrical run. The film performed well at the US box office, with the Tamil version earning $313,227. The film collected ₹11 crore (US$1.1 million) in Tamil Nadu in three days. The film collected approximately ₹1.5 crore (US$160,000) on Thursday premiere and regular Friday and Saturday shows in United States.

== Legacy ==
Songs from the film have inspired the titles of other Tamil films. A film titled Vaanil Thedi Nindren, inspired from the opening line of "Nallai Allai", began production in May 2017, before being cancelled. Likewise, a film titled Vaan starring Ashok Selvan began production in December 2018, with the name and first look poster drawing comparisons to the song "Vaan Varuvaan" from Kaatru Veliyidai.

== Accolades ==
Award (Note: Awards are in Alphabetical order.)	Date of ceremony (Note: Date is linked to the article about the awards held that year, wherever possible.)	Category	Recipient(s)	Result	Ref.
Ananda Vikatan Cinema Awards	13 January 2018	Best Cinematographer	Ravi Varman	Won	
Ananda Vikatan Cinema Awards	13 January 2018	Best Music Director	A. R. Rahman (Note: Also for Mersal)	Won	
Asiavision Awards	24 November 2017	Best Film – Tamil	Kaatru Veliyidai	Nominated	
Asiavision Awards	24 November 2017	Best Actress – Tamil	Aditi Rao Hydari	Won	
Behindwoods Gold Medal Awards	17 June 2018	Best Actor in a Lead Role – Male	Karthi	Won	
Behindwoods Gold Medal Awards	17 June 2018	Best Cinematographer	Ravi Varman	Won	
Behindwoods Gold Medal Awards	17 June 2018	Best Music Director	A. R. Rahman	Won	
Behindwoods Gold Medal Awards	17 June 2018	Best Female Playback Singer	Shashaa Tirupati for ("Vaan Varuvaan")	Won	
Edison Awards	26 February 2018	Face of the Year	Aditi Rao Hydari	Won	
Filmfare Awards South	16 June 2018	Best Music Director – Tamil	A. R. Rahman	Nominated	
Filmfare Awards South	16 June 2018	Best Lyricist – Tamil	Vairamuthu for ("Vaan Varuvaan")	Won	
Filmfare Awards South	16 June 2018	Best Lyricist – Tamil	Madhan Karky for ("Azhagiye")	Nominated	
Filmfare Awards South	16 June 2018	Best Male Playback Singer – Tamil	Arjun Chandy and Haricharan for ("Azhagiye")	Nominated	
Filmfare Awards South	16 June 2018	Best Female Playback Singer – Tamil	Shashaa Tirupati for ("Vaan Varuvaan")	Won	
National Film Awards	3 May 2018	Best Music Direction (Songs)	A. R. Rahman	Won	
National Film Awards	3 May 2018	Best Female Playback Singer	Shashaa Tirupati for ("Vaan Varuvaan")	Won	
South Indian International Movie Awards	14 – 15 September 2018	Best Cinematographer – Tamil	Ravi Varman	Won	
South Indian International Movie Awards	14 – 15 September 2018	Best Female Debut – Tamil	Aditi Rao Hydari	Won	
South Indian International Movie Awards	14 – 15 September 2018	Best Music Director – Tamil	A. R. Rahman	Nominated	
South Indian International Movie Awards	14 – 15 September 2018	Best Lyricist – Tamil	Vairamuthu for ("Vaan Varuvaan")	Nominated	
South Indian International Movie Awards	14 – 15 September 2018	Best Lyricist – Tamil	Madhan Karky for ("Azhagiye")	Nominated	
South Indian International Movie Awards	14 – 15 September 2018	Best Male Playback Singer – Tamil	Arjun Chandy and Haricharan for ("Azhagiye")	Nominated	
South Indian International Movie Awards	14 – 15 September 2018	Best Female Playback Singer – Tamil	Shashaa Tirupati for ("Vaan Varuvaan")	Nominated	
Vijay Awards	26 May 2018	Best Cinematographer	Ravi Varman	Won	
Vijay Awards	26 May 2018	Best Music Director	A. R. Rahman	Won	
Vijay Awards	26 May 2018	Best Male Playback Singer	Arjun Chandy and Haricharan for ("Azhagiye")	Nominated	
Vijay Awards	26 May 2018	Best Choreographer	Brinda – "Azhagiye"	Won	
Vijay Awards	26 May 2018	Favourite Song	A. R. Rahman – "Azhagiye"	Nominated	
