= Dil Bechara (soundtrack) =

Soundtrack album by A. R. Rahman
- Released: 10 July 2020
- Recorded: 2018–2019
- Studio: Panchathan Record Inn and AM Studios, Chennai; A. R. Studios, Mumbai; Panchathan Hollywood Studios, Los Angeles; KM Music Conservatory, Chennai
- Genre: Feature film soundtrack
- Length: 31:56
- Language: Hindi; English
- Label: Sony Music India
- Producer: A. R. Rahman

A. R. Rahman chronology
99 Songs (2020)	Dil Bechara (2020)	Mimi (2021)

Dil Bechara is the soundtrack album, composed by A. R. Rahman with lyrics written by Amitabh Bhattacharya, to the 2020 Hindi film of the same name, directed by Mukesh Chhabra and produced by Fox Star Studios, starring Sushant Singh Rajput and Sanjana Sanghi. The soundtrack album incorporates various genres. The title track served as a promotional single and the album was released on 10 July 2020 through Sony Music India. Upon release, the album received mixed reviews from music critics, who praised its orchestration, duet collaborations, and harmonies, but pointed out unusual lyrics and musical overproduction.

== Development ==
A. R. Rahman was reportedly signed in to compose music for the Indian adaptation of The Fault in Our Stars in March 2018 (earlier titled as Kizie Aur Manny), and formally announced his association with the film and record label Sony Music Entertainment in September 2018. In February 2019, the film was renamed to Dil Bechara as Rahman recorded the track incorporating lyrics titled "Dil Bechara". Rucha Pathak, the CCO of Fox Star Studios, stated that the title track was a "vibrant and fun number", suitable to the film's theme. According to an interview with Faridoon Shahyr at Bollywood Hungama, Chhabra was the casting director for 99 Songs (also scored by Rahman), where he narrated the script of "Dil Bechara". Rahman loved the idea and Chhabra's honesty on the film and agreed within five minutes to compose the score and soundtrack.

While Rahman began conceptualizing the soundtrack, he was assisted by Hriday Gattani, who served as music supervisor. Within two weeks, Rahman was ready with melodies. "Main Tumhara" was amongst the first songs recorded and "Maskhari" was the last. By June 2019, 5 to 6 songs had been composed. On 19 October 2019, Rahman, through his official twitter handle, tweeted about the mixing of the album in progress. In July 2019, Udit Narayan recorded a track for the soundtrack album, but it was not chosen in the final soundtrack. In an interview with The Indian Express, singer Poorvi Koutish stated that she had recorded the vocals on the title track and the song "Mera Naam Kizzie".

According to Rahman, the whole album was curated to symbolize feelings of the heart and would be associated with memories of the late actor. The track "Dil Bechara" is a song describing the celebration of life's ups and downs. The track "Khulke Jeene Ka" is an adaptation of Rahman's unreleased Tamil composition "Kannil Oru Thali". The director was quoted as saying, "The music album is an emotional rollercoaster of romance, friendship and the odds pitted against two young people in love." The song "Taare Ginn" presents 'thrill experienced by lead characters at the beginning of love.'

While interacting through his Twitter account, a Rahman's fan pointed out on a song used in the film score. It was titled "Never Say Goodbye", and appeared as part of the end credits. In response to the fan's tweet, Rahman agreed to complete the track. Rahman wrote the English lyrics on the song that was sung by A. R. Ameen. It was released on 2 September 2020. Referencing the demise of the actor, Ameen expressed, "Goodbyes are never easy. But they also mark new beginnings. You heard a part of this song in Dil Bechara and showered us with so much love that we had to complete it and present it to you all."

== Track listing ==
The track listing was released by A. R. Rahman through his official Twitter account on 6 July 2020.

All tracks are written by Amitabh Bhattacharya.

Dil Bechara (Original Motion Picture Soundtrack)
No.	Title	Singer(s)	Length
1.	"Dil Bechara"	A. R. Rahman	2:43
2.	"Taare Ginn"	Mohit Chauhan, Shreya Ghoshal	4:17
3.	"Khulke Jeene Ka"	Arijit Singh, Shashaa Tirupati	4:06
4.	"Main Tumhara"	Jonita Gandhi, Hriday Gattani	4:18
5.	"Maskhari"	Sunidhi Chauhan, Hriday Gattani	3:15
6.	"Afreeda"	Sanaa Moussa, Raja Kumari	3:21
7.	"Mera Naam Kizzie"	Aditya Narayan, Poorvi Koutish	4:04
8.	"Friendzone"	A. R. Rahman	3:06
9.	"The Horizon of Saudade"	Instrumental	2:46
Total length:			31:56

Bonus single
No.	Title	Lyrics	Singer(s)	Length
1.	"Never Say Goodbye"	A. R. Rahman	A. R. Ameen	3:43
Total length:				35:39

== Release ==
The title track served as the lead single from the album. It was released on 10 July 2020, on the same day as the rest of the soundtrack.The Indian Express hailed the song "a signature Rahman appeal". The songs "Taare Ginn" and "Khulke Jeene Ka" were released as singles on 17 July and 19 July 2020. On 22 July 2020, a 13-minute tribute to the film's late lead actor in the form of a virtual concert on Disney+ Hotstar and also the official YouTube channel of Sony Music India. The musical ensemble apart from the respective original track singers were A. R. Ameen and Raheema Rahman. A bonus single track "Never Say Goodbye" was released on 2 September 2020.

== Reception ==
Music critic Umesh Panwani of Koimoi rated the album 3 out of 5 stars, stating "All said and done, the lyric department in most of the songs struggles to match the wonder orchestrated by AR Rahman." Uday Bhatia of Mint opined that the soundtrack has something like a healing touch, an enveloping warmth of melody, harmony, and familiarity, calling it Rahman's warmest soundtrack. In her review for Scroll.in, Devarsi Ghosh titled the album review: "Lovable and catchy tunes with a ring of pathos"; however, she called some of the compositions bogged down by overproduction. Srinivas Ramanujam of The Hindu stated: "AR Rahman delivers a rousing swansong to Sushant Singh Rajput [...] with an album that strikes a chord during the first listen, a slightly unusual phenomenon for a composer whose works are usually known to 'grow on you'". Sankhayan Ghosh of Film Companion magazine stated: "An AR Rahman Album that Hits the Sweet Spot Between 'What Works' and 'Something New’ [...] presenting exquisite duets." In his review for Zoom TV, Gaurang Chauhan assigned the album 3.5 score (out of 5), calling it "soulful, melodious and novel. Props to AR Rahman and Amitabh Bhattacharya."

On the contrary, Rohit Mehrotra of Bloomberg Quint stated: "Rahman again fails to impress with 'Dil Bechara' [...] while some songs of the film hit the right notes, some don't." He compared the album's lacking to Rahman's previous Lekar Hum Deewana Dil.

== Accolades ==
Award (Note: Awards, festivals and organizations are in alphabetical order.)	Date of ceremony (Note: Date is linked to the article about the awards held that year, wherever possible.)	Category	Recipient(s)	Result	Ref.
Filmfare Awards	27 March 2021	Best Music Director	A. R. Rahman	Nominated	
Filmfare Awards	27 March 2021	Best Background Score	A. R. Rahman	Nominated	
Mirchi Music Awards	19 March 2022	Album of The Year	Dil Bechara	Nominated	
Mirchi Music Awards	19 March 2022	Listeners' Choice Album of The Year	Dil Bechara	Nominated	

== Personnel ==
=== Soundtrack album ===
Credits adapted from Spotify.

- A. R. Rahman - Singer (Tracks 1, 8), composer (All tracks), producer (All tracks), musical arrangements (All tracks)
- Raja Kumari - Rap (Track 6)
- Hriday Gattani - Music supervisor (All tracks), Backing vocals (Track 1,3), Electric guitar (Track 5), Mouth trumpet (Track 8)
- Hiral Viradia - Music supervisor (All tracks), Backing vocals (Track 5, 8)
- Arjun Chandy - Backing vocals (Track 5,7,8)
- Poorvi Koutish - Backing vocals (Track 1)
- Veena Murali - Backing vocals (Track 2)
- Deepthi Suresh - Backing vocals (Track 8)
- Rakshita Suresh - Backing vocals (Track 8)
- Lavita Lobo - Backing vocals (Track 8)
- Shenbagaraj- Backing vocals (Track 8)
- Santosh Harirahan - Backing vocals (Track 8)
- Vignesh Narayanan - Backing vocals (Track 8)
- Madhura Dhara Talluri - Backing vocals (Track 8)
- Nakul Abhyankar - Backing vocals (Track 8)
- Keba Jeremiah - Guitars (Track 1,3,6,8), Ukulele (Track 3), Acoustic guitars (Track 5)
- Rhythm Shaw - Guitars (Track 8)
- Dhruv Vishwanath - Guitars (Track 8)
- Suresh Lalwani - Solo Violin (Track 2, 8)
- Achyuth Jaigopal - Charango (Track 2)
- Rasika Shekar - Flute (Track 2)
- Tapas Roy - Mandolin (Track 5), Saz (Track 5), Banjo (Track 5)
- Naveen Iyer - Flute (Track 4)
- Macedonian Symphony Orchestra (Track 2)
- Sunshine Orchestra - V. J. Srinivasamurthy (Track 1)
- T. R. Krishna Chetan - Sound Engineer (Panchathan Record Inn, Chennai) [All tracks], Additional Arrangements & Programming (Tracks 1, 3)
- Leon D'Souza - Additional Arrangements & Programming (Track 8)
- Jerry Silvester Vincent - Additional Arrangements & Programming (Track 1)
- Santosh Dayanidhi - Additional Arrangements & Programming (Track 1)
- Pawan CH - Additional Arrangements & Programming (Track 1)
- Jim Satya - Additional Arrangements & Programming (Track 2,8)
- Suresh Permal - Sound Engineer (Panchathan Record Inn, Chennai) [All tracks], Mastering (Studio Mastering) [All tracks]
- Karthik Sekaran - Sound Engineer (Panchathan Record Inn, Chennai) [All tracks]
- Riyasdeen Riyan - Sound Engineer (Panchathan Record Inn, Chennai) [All tracks]
- Kumaran Sivamani - Sound Engineer (Panchathan Record Inn, Chennai) [Track 6], Additional Arrangements & Programming (Track 2,8)
- Ishaan Chhabra - Sound Engineer (Panchathan Record Inn, Chennai) [All tracks]
- Nakul Abhyankar - Sound Engineer (Panchathan Record Inn, Chennai) [Track 3]
- Suryansh - Sound Engineer (Panchathan Record Inn, Chennai) [Track 1,2,5]
- Parag Chhabra - Sound Engineer (Panchathan Record Inn, Chennai) [Track 2, 4]
- S. Sivakumar - Sound Engineer (AM Studios, Chennai) [All tracks], Mastering (Apple Digital Master) [All tracks]
- Kannan Ganpat - Sound Engineer (AM Studios, Chennai) [All tracks]
- Pradeep Menon - Sound Engineer (AM Studios, Chennai) [Track 1]
- Krishnan Subramaniyan - Sound Engineer (AM Studios, Chennai) [Track 1,2]
- Manoj Raman - Sound Engineer (AM Studios, Chennai) [Track 1,2,4]
- Aravind MS - Sound Engineer (AM Studios, Chennai) [Track 3,6]
- Pradvay Sivashankar - Sound Mixing (All tracks)
- P. A. Deepak - Sound Mixing (Track 1,2)
- R. Samidurai - Musicians' Fixers
- T M Faizuddin - Musician Coordinator
- Abdul Hayum Siddique - Musician Coordinators

=== Original Score ===
Credits adapted from the official website of Disney+ Hotstar.

- A. R. Rahman - Original score writer and producer

Orchestra

- Oleg Kontradenko - Score conductor, Macedonian Symphonic Orchestra
- Dzijan Emin - Score conductor, Macedonian Symphonic Orchestra
- Alen Hadzi Stefanov - Sound Engineer
- Koca Davicodenic - Protocol Operator
- Igor Vasilev - Protocol Operator
- Ilija Grkovski - Stage Manager
- Teodora Arsovska - Stage Manager
- Joaquim Badia - Orchestrator
- Neelesh Mandalapu - Additional Orchestration
- Andrew T. Mackay (for Bohemia Junction) - India Orchestra Coordination
- V. J. Srinivasamurthy - Conductor (Sunshine Orchestra)
- Lisa - Conductor (Sunshine Orchestra Brass Ensemble)
- Prabhakaran - Conductor (Sunshine Orchestra Brass Ensemble)

Instruments & vocals

- Keba Jeremiah - Guitars
- Sunil Milner - Guitars
- Chris Jason - Guitars
- Suresh Lalwani - Violin
- Vignesh U - Violin
- M. Balaji - Solo Cello
- Jonita Gandhi - Vocalist
- Tapas Roy - Mandolin

Programming

- Hiral Viradia - Music Supervisor, Vocalist, Sound Engineer (Pachanthann Record Inn, Chennai)
- Hriday Gattani - Music Supervisor, Vocalist, Sound Engineer (A. R. Studios, Mumbai)
- Jim Satya - Additional Programming
- Ishaan Chhabra - Additional Programming
- Jerry Silvester Vincent - Additional Programming
- Nakul Abhyankar - Vocalist, Additional Programming, Sound Engineer (Panchathan Record Inn, Chennai)
- Pawan CH - Additional Programming
- Suryansh - Vocalist, Additional Programming, Sound Engineer (Panchathan Record Inn, Chennai)

Sound Engineers

- Ishaan Chhabra - Sound Engineer (Pachanthann Record Inn, Chennai)
- Suresh Permal - Sound Engineer (Pachanthann Record Inn, Chennai)
- Kumaran Sivamani - Sound Engineer (Panchathan Record Inn, Chennai)
- T. R. Krishna Chetan - Sound Engineer (Pachanthann Record Inn, Chennai)
- S. Sivakumar - Sound Engineer (AM Studios, Chennai)
- Riyasdeen Riyan - Sound Engineer (AM Studios, Chennai)
- Pradeep Menon - Sound Engineer (AM Studios, Chennai)
- Krishnan Subramaniyan - Sound Engineer (AM Studios, Chennai)
- Manoj Raman - Sound Engineer (AM Studios, Chennai)
- Aravind MS - Sound Engineer (AM Studios, Chennai)
- Aravind Crescendo - Sound Engineer (KM Music Conservatory, Chennai)
- Dilshad Shabbir Shaikh - Sound Engineer (A. R. Studios, Mumbai)
- R. Nitish Kumar - Sound Engineer (A. R. Studios, Mumbai)
- Kevin Doucette - Sound Engineer (Panchathan Hollywood Studios, Los Angeles)
- Tony Joy - Sound Engineer (Panchathan Hollywood Studios, Los Angeles)
- Harshavardhan Upadrashta - Sound Engineer (KM Music Conservatory, Chennai)
- Pradvay Sivashankar - Stereo Mixing
- R. Samidurai - Musicians' Fixers
- T M Faizuddin - Musician Coordinator
- Abdul Hayum Siddique - Musician Coordinators
