= 99 Songs (soundtrack) =

2020 soundtrack album by A.R. Rahman

- Soundtrack cover

Soundtrack album by A. R. Rahman
- Released: 20 March 2020
- Recorded: 2015–2020
- Studios: Panchathan Record Inn and AM Studios, Chennai; A. R. Studios, Mumbai; Panchathan Hollywood Studios, Los Angeles
- Genres: rock, pop, ballad, melody, devotional, folk.
- Length: 1:02:59
- Languages: Hindi; Tamil; Telugu
- Label: Sony Music India
- Producer: A. R. Rahman

A. R. Rahman chronology
Bigil (2019)	99 Songs (2020)	Dil Bechara (2020)

Singles from 99 Songs
- 1. "Sai Shirdi Sai" Released: 5 April 2019; 2. "The Oracle" Released: 14 February 2020; 3. "Jwalamukhi" Released: 20 February 2020 (Male Version) 26 February 2020 (Female Version); 4. "Teri Nazar" Released: 13 March 2020

99 Songs is the soundtrack album composed by A. R. Rahman for the 2021 Indian film of the same name, directed by Vishwesh Krishnamoorthy and produced by Rahman's YM Movies, along with Jio Studios and Ideal Entertainment. The film which stars newcomers Ehan Bhat and Edilsy Vargas, also marked Rahman's maiden stint as a scriptwriter and producer respectively.

The album composed by A. R. Rahman had been in development for five years, since 2015. The soundtrack consists of 14 songs each in Hindi, Tamil and Telugu languages, which also includes the film's background score as well. 99 Songs marked the first Indian soundtrack album to use Dolby Atmos technology.

It is Rahman's first Hindi album after his absence from the Bollywood music scene, since Mom (2017), the last Hindi film he composed. The original version of the soundtrack album was released digitally through music platforms on 20 March 2020 to widespread acclaim from critics. The Tamil and Telugu versions of the soundtrack which released on 26 March and 2 April 2021 were also well received.

== Background ==
According to the title 99 Songs, composer A. R. Rahman revealed that the total number of the songs in the film does not have 99 in number, but the film will present 14 original compositions for each language (Hindi, Tamil and Telugu) and features some of his instrumental score used in the background music. Rahman started working on the film's soundtrack in 2015 and since then its production was delayed, until its completion on 2020; with sources stated the delay due to Rahman's commitments in other projects, and the research work for the soundtrack. Adding to this reasons is he also started composing for Shankar's 2.0 in the same year, but the album's completion took a long time before being released in November 2018. Rahman had stated that the soundtrack features some international artists.

Lyrics for the original Hindi version of the soundtrack have been given by Navneet Virk, Dilshaad Shabbir Shaikh, Abhay Jodhpurkar, Munna Shaukat, Mashook Rahman and Raftaar. Madhan Karky, Thamarai, Kabilan, Kalpradaa, Rakendu mouli and Ananta Sriram were brought in to write lyrics for the respective Tamil and Telugu versions of the soundtrack. During the album production in 2017, Rahman had worked with Navneet Virk for some soundtracks like OK Jaanu, Kaatru Veliyidai and Viceroy's House, with awarding the World Soundtrack Award – Public Choice, for his work in the latter. Shashwat Singh, who had played a role of a playback singer for the film's lead character Ehan Bhat, is an alumnus of Rahman's KM Music Conservatory, Chennai. During the film's production stage, Singh has recorded two songs with Rahman, Singh has heard on five tracks in the film. In December 2018, guitarist Keba Jeremiah tweeted that he has worked on the film's background score. In March 2018, Randy Kerber who has played for La La Land and many Hollywood films announced that he did a session for the film's score.

During the promotional event for the film's soundtrack on 20 February 2020, Rahman had announced that the film's soundtrack will be mixed, mastered and produced in Dolby Atmos technology. With this, 99 Songs became the first Indian soundtrack album to use this technology, and Rahman became the first Indian artist to do so. According to Rahman, he stated that each musical chord will strike an emotional connection with the listener, which was considered as an advantage with the album being mastered in Dolby Atmos. The audio rights of this film has been bought by Sony Music India, thus marking the 23rd year association of the label with Rahman.

== Development ==
During the time of pre-production, Rahman and Vishwesh Krishnamoorthy went towards an extensive research to find the suitable sound for the film's theme, when its first screenplay draft being ready for review. At the office of YM Movies in Chennai, Rahman played a melody that was echoing between them revealing that the delicate melody was now a thunderous entity, it became the theme music for the film, which was titled "The Oracle". Rahman joined hands with the Budapest Scoring Orchestra with flautist Kareem Kamalakhar and pianist Randy Kerber to record the bit score. The director Vishwesh posted a tweet stating it as: "the first bit of music to make it out into the world".

In June 2019, Rahman shared recording of the song "Humnawaa" on Instagram, which was sung by Armaan Malik and Shashaa Tirupati. This was the second collaboration between Rahman, Malik and Tirupati after recording for "Mechanical Sundariye", which is the Hindi version of the original song "Endhira Logathu Sundhariye" from 2.0. When the film's post-production began, Arijit Singh started crooning for the song "Jwalamukhi" which also have a respective female version, recorded by Poorvi Koutish. Koutish a student of Rahman's KM Music Conservatory, was one of the participant of the sixth edition of Indian Idol, where she bagged the titular award. Besides "Jwalamukhi", Koutish had also recorded two more songs with one of them being an instrumental version. Rahman also picked Sarthak Kalyani and Swagat Rathod, who contested in their YouTube show ARRived, to record the song Veere Kadh De.

The 14-song soundtrack album consists of various genres which included rock, pop, ballad, melody, devotional and folk. The song "Sai Shirdi Sai" which was included in the film's track list, was earlier released as a promotional single in April 2019 in three languages (Hindi, Tamil, Telugu), as an independent track. It is a devotional Sufi number, sung by Bela Shende. Shreya Ghoshal recorded a song for the film's Tamil version titled "Azhage Aaruyire", but its Hindi version was not included in the soundtrack.

== Marketing and release ==
With A. R. Rahman announcing the film's lead actor Ehan Bhat, through social media. He also invited him through the reality show The Voice, which was telecasted on Star Plus on 27 April 2019. In the show, Bhat performed the film's theme music, titled "The Oracle", which was widely appreciated by the audience. Rahman performed live to the music of 99 Songs at the Busan International Film Festival, held in Busan, South Korea, where the film's premiere took place on 9 October 2019.

On 14 February 2020, Rahman released the theme song "The Oracle" through streaming platforms and YouTube. A promotional event was conducted in Mumbai to coincide the announcement of the music album's collaboration with Dolby Atmos Music on 20 February 2020, with the male version of "Jwalamukhi" released as a single, the same day. The music video of the single was aired through 9XM, 9X Jalwa and 9X Tashan on 29 February and 1 March 2020, apart from being released through YouTube. The female version of "Jwalamukhi" was released on 26 February 2020. The music video was released simultaneously through YouTube and aired live in MTV India on 7 March 2020 ahead of Women's Day. The fifth single track titled "Teri Nazar" was released on 13 March 2020 and the original soundtrack album was released on 20 March 2020 by Rahman, due to COVID-19 pandemic as the composer stated it as a gesture to spread cheer during uncertain times.

In March 2021, Rahman noticed a fan's request to release the Tamil and Telugu version of the film's soundtrack, stating a reply that the albums will be out within next week. His Malaysia-based fan page, released the official tracklist of the Tamil version, through social media accounts on 24 March 2021, and was released on 26 March 2021. The soundtrack's Telugu version was unveiled on 2 April 2021. A physical launch for the same was held coinciding with the promotional events in Chennai and Hyderabad on 26 March and 2 April. Both Rahman and Bhat attended the events along with prominent members from the Telugu and Tamil film industry. A special concert was hosted by JioSaavn on 14 April 2021, in Hindi, Tamil and Telugu languages.

== Track listing ==
=== Hindi ===
99 Songs (Original Motion Picture Soundtrack)
No.	Title	Lyrics	Artist(s)	Length
1.	"O Aashiqa"	Navneet Virk	A. R. Rahman, Shashwat Singh	5:24
2.	"Sofia"	Navneet Virk	A. R. Rahman, Shashwat Singh	4:35
3.	"Nayi Nayi"	Raftaar, Navneet Virk	Shashwat Singh, Raftaar	4:52
4.	"Humnawaa"	Dilshad Shabbir Shaikh, Abhay Jodhpurkar	Armaan Malik, Shashaa Tirupati	3:21
5.	"Jwalamukhi" (Male Version)	Navneet Virk	Arijit Singh	4:08
6.	"Soja Soja"	Navneet Virk	Shashaa Tirupati	5:25
7.	"Sai Shirdi Sai"	Munna Shaukat, Navneet Virk	A. R. Rahman, Bela Shende	6:03
8.	"Teri Nazar"	Dilshaad Shabbir Shaikh, Navneet Virk	Shashwat Singh	4:03
9.	"Jwalamukhi" (Female Version)	Navneet Virk	Shashwat Singh, Poorvi Koutish	5:07
10.	"Gori Godh Bhari"	Navneet Virk	Anuradha Sriram, Alka Yagnik, Shweta Mohan	4:49
11.	"O Mera Chand"	Navneet Virk	Bela Shende	4:16
12.	"Veere Kadh De"	Navneet Virk, Shiv	Sarthak Kalyani, Swagat Rathod	3:38
13.	"The Voice Without Words"	Navneet Virk	Poorvi Koutish	4:13
14.	"The Oracle"	–	Instrumental	3:02

=== Tamil ===
99 Songs (Tamil) [Soundtrack- Dubbed]
No.	Title	Lyrics	Artist(s)	Length
1.	"Oor Aayiram Vaanavil"	Vivek	Vijay Yesudas	5:24
2.	"Naalai Naalai"	Vivek	Benny Dayal	4:54
3.	"Sofia"	Madhan Karky	Sreekanth Hariharan	4:32
4.	"Poyisonna Posikiduven"	Madhan Karky	Shashaa Tirupati, Nikhita Gandhi	5:25
5.	"Jwalamukhi"	Madhan Karky	Sarthak Kalyani, Poorvi Koutish	5:07
6.	"Punnagai Maayai"	Thamarai, Kabilan	Abhay Jodhpurkar, Shashaa Tirupati	3:20
7.	"Nee Illa Naanum"	Kabilan	Haricharan	4:06
8.	"Vaa Vengaiye"	Pa. Vijay, Shiv	Sarthak Kalyani, Swagat Rathod, Srinisha Jayaseelan, Shiv	1:32
9.	"Jwalamukhi" (Reprise)	Madhan Karky	Sid Sriram	4:08
10.	"The Oracle" (Instrumental)	–	Instrumental	3:01
11.	"Seemanthapoo"	Kutti Revathi	Jonita Gandhi, Sharanya Srinivas, Sireesha Bhagavatula	4:49
12.	"Aagaaya Neelangalil"	Thamarai	Shreya Ghoshal	4:13
13.	"Sai Shirdi Sai"	Mashook Rahman	A. R. Rahman, Bela Shende	6:04
14.	"The Voice Without Words"	Navneet Virk	Poorvi Koutish	4:13
Total length:				1:00:48

=== Telugu ===
99 Songs (Telugu) [Soundtrack- Dubbed]
No.	Title	Lyrics	Artist(s)	Length
1.	"O Maanavaa"	Rakendu Mouli	Vijay Yesudas	5:24
2.	"Navi Naveename"	Rakendu Mouli	Benny Dayal	4:54
3.	"Sofia"	Rakendu Mouli	Sarthak Kalyani	4:32
4.	"Jola Jola"	Rakendu Mouli	Shashaa Tirupati, Nikhita Gandhi	5:25
5.	"Jwalamukhi"	Rakendu Mouli	Sarthak Kalyani, Poorvi Koutish	5:07
6.	"Choose Maaye Ilaa"	Rakendu Mouli	Nakul Abhyankar, Shashaa Tirupati	3:21
7.	"Nee Choope Naaku"	Rakendu Mouli	Sid Sriram	4:06
8.	"Chal Hat Be"	Rakendu Mouli, Shiv	Sarthak Kalyani, Swagat Rathod, Poorvi Koutish, Shiv	1:32
9.	"Jwalamukhi" (Reprise)	Rakendu Mouli	Sid Sriram	4:08
10.	"The Oracle" (Instrumental)	–	Instrumental	3:01
11.	"Poova Malle Pooseva"	Kalapradah	Shweta Mohan, Sharanya Srinivas, Sireesha Bhagavatula	4:49
12.	"Aakasha Thaaralatho"	Kalapradah	Shreya Ghoshal	4:13
13.	"Sai Shirdi Sai"	Sirivennela Seetharama Sastry	A. R. Rahman, Bela Shende	6:04
14.	"The Voice Without Words"	Navneet Virk	Poorvi Koutish	4:13
Total length:				1:00:49

== Reception ==
Professional ratings
Review scores
Source	Rating
Music Aloud	4.5/5 stars
Koimoi	4.5/5 stars
Movie Crow	4/5 stars
A Humming Heart	9/10 stars
Biz Asia	3.5/5 stars

The soundtrack received widespread critical acclaim. Pooja Darade of Koimoi rated the soundtrack album 4.5 out of 5, stating "99 Songs takes us on a never-ending trip of music with a mix of different kinds of track, which is essential in the times of remixes and lack of originality." Srinivasa Ramanujam of The Hindu stated that the film music have zero fuss and fanfare. The other speciality of this 14-track album is that it puts the spotlight on two supremely-gifted vocal talents in Shashwat Singh and Bela Shende. Vipin Nair of Music Aloud gave the album 4.5 out of 5 and summarized "A.R.Rahman produces a thoroughly diverse soundtrack that is the best he has given Bollywood in a long time. An album that has been a very long time coming, and ends up being totally worth the wait."

Moviecrow, gave the soundtrack 4 out of 5 and started "The whopping 14 song soundtrack is a nostalgic blend of good old Rahman melodies as well as composer leaves his own touch backed by an exceptional set of singers." A review by A Humming Heart concluded, "The album overall succeeds in registering coherent, nostalgic yet refreshing sounds, and is one of AR Rahman's most definitive works since 2015", and gave 9/10 to the album.

Devarsi Ghosh of Scroll.in reviewed it as "a 14-song album is allowed to take a qualitative dip every now and then. There is enough in 99 Songs to live with and revisit." Ghosh praised the song "O Aashiqa" in its year-ender review stating that the song "brims with deep emotion that is cooked at a low flame, unlike most contemporary Indian film music where a tune gets deep-fried between layers of harmonies". Film critic Baradwaj Rangan of Film Companion South stated that "99 Songs isn't just a movie's soundtrack album. It's a 'concept album', like the whoppers that major rock bands used to make when music was more than just something you listened to while doing the dishes."

Sankhayan Ghosh of Film Companion's Mixtape 2020: Best of Music in Hindi Films and TV listed two of the composer's album along with Dil Bechara. The article listed "Rahman had been away from Hindi films for four years, but suddenly having two albums in three months is proof that good things can happen in a terrible year. 99 Songs provided much comfort in those initial months, a song for every mood. A love song (O Aashiqa) that segues, midway, to something more spiritual, a stadium-rock anthem (Nayi Nayi), a jazz number (Soja Soja), a drunk, broken reprise version of the title track, a devotional song (Sai Shirdi Sai) that works like medicine."

== Release history ==
Album	Country	Date	Format	Label	Ref
99 Songs (Original)	Worldwide	20 March 2020	Digital download	Sony Music India	
99 Songs (Original)	India	2 September 2020	CD	Sony Music Entertainment	
99 Songs (Original)	United States	30 September 2020	CD	Sony Music Entertainment	
99 Songs (Original)	United Kingdom	28 October 2020	CD	Sony Music Entertainment	
99 Songs (Tamil)	Worldwide	26 March 2021	Digital download	Sony Music India	
99 Songs (Telugu)	Worldwide	2 April 2021	Digital download	Sony Music India	

== Background score ==
99 Songs (Original Score)

Film score by A. R. Rahman
- Released: 16 April 2021
- Recorded: 2018–2021
- Studios: Panchathan Record Inn and AM Studios, Chennai
- Genre: Feature film score
- Length: 48:47
- Label: Sony Music
- Producer: A. R. Rahman

99 Songs: Music from the Motion Picture
No.	Title	Music	Length
1.	"Music Is Not For You Jay - Original Score"	A.R. Rahman	1:36
2.	"Over - Original Score"	A.R. Rahman	1:12
3.	"Intervention - Original Score"	A.R. Rahman	1:02
4.	"Come To Shillong - Original Score"	A.R. Rahman	0:46
5.	"Polo's Family - Original Score"	A.R. Rahman	0:57
6.	"You Are A Mystery, Jay - Original Score"	A.R. Rahman	1:11
7.	"Thank You Polo - Original Score"	A.R. Rahman	1:26
8.	"The Guitar Shop - Original Score"	A.R. Rahman, Hiral Viradia	1:57
9.	"Can You Write 100 Songs? - Original Score"	A.R. Rahman	3:55
10.	"Jay Starts Writing Songs - Original Score"	A.R. Rahman, Dilshabir Shabbir Shaikh	1:39
11.	"Sheila Vibes - Original Score"	A.R. Rahman	0:47
12.	"Red Mascara - Original Score"	A.R. Rahman	0:41
13.	"Little Jay - Original Score"	A.R. Rahman	0:42
14.	"Little Jay's Discovery - Original Score"	A.R. Rahman	1:53
15.	"Drugs - Original Score"	A.R. Rahman, Jonita Gandhi, Lady Kash	1:39
16.	"Something Happened - Original Score"	A.R. Rahman, Ella Fitzgerald, Louis Armstrong	3:52
17.	"Sheila's Calling You - Original Score"	A.R. Rahman	0:37
18.	"Anger & Talent - Original Score"	A.R. Rahman	1:28
19.	"I Betrayed My Father - Original Score"	A.R. Rahman	0:52
20.	"Jay's Father"	A.R. Rahman	1:19
21.	"Interrogation - Original Score"	A.R. Rahman	3:12
22.	"Threads Are Like Harp Strings - Original Score"	A.R. Rahman, Hiral Viradia	1:43
23.	"Escape - Original Score"	A.R. Rahman	1:53
24.	"Polo's Family - Original Score"	A.R. Rahman, Linda Linda, Suzanne D'Mello, Hiral Viradia	1:52
25.	"Father Is No More - Original Score"	A.R. Rahman, Linda Lind	1:38
26.	"Concubine's Wisdom - Original Score"	A.R. Rahman	1:53
27.	"Mother - Original Score"	A.R. Rahman, Madhura Talluri, Suzanne D'Mello, Hiral Viradia	1:44
28.	"Sofie's Back - Original Score"	A.R. Rahman	2:53
29.	"Oracle - Original Score"	A.R. Rahman	2:17
Total length:			48:47
