= Sanju (soundtrack) =

Soundtrack album by A. R. Rahman, Rohan-Rohan and Vikram Montrose
- Released: 29 June 2018
- Recorded: 2017–2018
- Genre: Feature film soundtrack
- Length: 26:25
- Language: Hindi
- Label: T-Series
External audio
- Audio Jukebox on YouTube

A. R. Rahman chronology
Beyond the Clouds (2018)	Sanju (2018)	Chekka Chivantha Vaanam (2018)

Rohan-Rohan chronology
Bucket List (2018 film) (2018)	Sanju (2018)	Jaga Vegli Antayatra (2018)

Vikram Montrose chronology
Sanju (2018)	Prassthanam (2019)

Sanju is the soundtrack to the 2018 film of the same name directed by Rajkumar Hirani, who co-wrote the screenplay with Abhijat Joshi and jointly produced with Vidhu Vinod Chopra under the banners Rajkumar Hirani Films and Vinod Chopra Films. Based on the life of actor Sanjay Dutt, the film stars Ranbir Kapoor as the titular character leading an ensemble supporting cast.

Sanju's soundtrack featured six songs composed by A. R. Rahman, Rohan-Rohan and Vikram Montrose, the former served as the guest composer. Irshad Kamil, Shekhar Astitwa, Puneet Sharma, Rohan Gokhale and Joshi penned the lyrics of the songs. The soundtrack was released by T-Series on 29 June 2018.

== Development ==
Sanju is Hirani's first film soundtrack not to be composed by Shantanu Moitra, who had previously worked on Lage Raho Munna Bhai (2006), 3 Idiots (2009) and PK (2014). Instead, Mumbai-based Rohan-Rohan (a duo consisting of Rohan Gokhale and Rohan Pradhan) composed two songs for the film: "Main Badhiya Tu Bhi Badhiya" and "Bhopu Baj Raha Hain". Vikram Montrose further composed two tracks: "Kar Har Maidaan Fateh" and "Baba Bolta Hain Bas Ho Gaya".

Hirani watched the screening of Ventilator (2016) at the MAMI Mumbai Film Festival and contacted Mapuskar, regarding the duo's recruitment as the film composers. "Main Badhiya Tu Bhi Badhiya" was sung by Sonu Nigam and Sunidhi Chauhan. It was a retro style experimental number as per Hirani's suggestion who ensured the song to be light and not caricature-ish. Pradhan wanted Chauhan to sing in a nasal manner so that she could manipulate her voice to produce an exaggerated twang similar to Shamshad Begum.

In June 2018, Hirani announced that A. R. Rahman would contribute two more songs for the film as a guest composer. Rahman's inclusion was mostly due to Chopra's dissatisfaction with one of the songs that did not fit well with the visuals. Since it was already shot, the team needed a new song to match the visuals instead of reshooting it in its entirety, and hence Chopra suggested Rahman's name. Rahman was "pleasantly surprised" on his contribution to the soundtrack as a guest composer, thereby making his maiden association with both Hirani and Chopra. He composed two songs: "Ruby Ruby" and "Mujhe Chaand Pe Le Chalo" which had been written by Irshad Kamil.

== Release ==
The first song "Main Badhiya Tu Bhi Badhiya" was picturised on Ranbir and Sonam Kapoor, which is a fun-song that revolves around Dutt's attempts to prove himself to lip sync to a song on screen. The music video of the song was released on 3 June 2018. The second song "Kar Har Maidaan Fateh" is a motivational number, picturised on Dutt's struggle to cope up with drug additction. It was released on 10 June. The third song "Ruby Ruby" was released as a single on 20 June. The song "Baba Bolta Hain Bas Ho Gaya" was released as a promotional video featuring Ranbir and Dutt on 27 June. Post-release, the video songs for "Mujhe Chaand Pe Le Chalo" featuring Ranbir and Karishma Tanna was released on 14 July, and "Bhopu Baj Raha Hain", picturised on Ranbir and Vicky Kaushal, was released on 19 July. The song was not featured in the film. The film's soundtrack was released by T-Series on the same date as the film, 29 June 2018.

== Track listing ==
No.	Title	Lyrics	Music	Singer(s)	Length
1.	"Main Badhiya Tu Bhi Badhiya"	Puneet Sharma	Rohan-Rohan	Sonu Nigam, Sunidhi Chauhan	4:34
2.	"Kar Har Maidaan Fateh"	Shekhar Astiwa	Vikram Montrose	Shreya Ghoshal, Sukhwinder Singh	5:11
3.	"Ruby Ruby"	Irshad Kamil	A. R. Rahman	Shashwat Singh, Poorvi Koutish	4:45
4.	"Baba Bola Hain Bas Ho Gaya"	Puneet Sharma, Abhijat Joshi, Rohan Gokhale	Vikram Montrose	Papon, Ranbir Kapoor, Supriya Pathak	4:45
5.	"Bhopu Baj Raha Hain"	Shekhar Astitwa, Rohan Gokhale	Rohan-Rohan	Nakash Aziz	4:03
6.	"Mujhe Chaand Pe Le Chalo"	Irshad Kamil	A. R. Rahman	Nikhita Gandhi	3:07
Total length:					26:25

== Reception ==
Umesh Punwani of Koimoi gave 3.5 stars out of 5 wrote "Sanju is not like any other Hirani album – it has songs which not only are situational but also will be with you way after you watch the movie". Joginder Tuteja of Bollywood Hungama described the soundtrack as "decent to good". Reza Noorani of The Times of India wrote "Hirani has moved away from working with only established musicians and has depended on a mix of new and old, which is why there is a freshness to the tracks". In a mixed review, Vipin Nair of Music Aloud rated 3 out of 5, complimenting Hirani's decision to collaborate with a new set of composers which avoided the repetitiveness of the soundtracks of his previous ventures, but "barring a couple of songs, the music still fails to make a major impact". Anish Mohanty of Planet Bollywood wrote "Rajkumar Hirani's films continue to disappoint with their music [...] It is high time Hirani starts introspecting and try to up the quality of music in his films."
