= Beyond the Clouds (soundtrack) =

Soundtrack album by A. R. Rahman
- Released: 2 April 2018 (CD); 30 May 2018 (Vinyl)
- Recorded: 2017–2018
- Studio: Panchathan Record Inn and AM Studios, Chennai; AR Studios, Mumbai
- Genre: Feature film soundtrack
- Length: 36:59
- Label: Zee Music Company; KM Musiq; Unisys
- Producer: A. R. Rahman

A. R. Rahman chronology
2.0 (2017)	Beyond the Clouds (2018)	Sanju (2018)

Singles from Beyond the Clouds
- 1. "Ey Chhote Motor Chala" Released: 6 April 2018

Beyond the Clouds is the soundtrack album to the 2018 film of the same name directed by Iranian film director Majid Majidi and starred Ishaan Khatter and Malavika Mohanan. The film's musical score and soundtrack were composed by A. R. Rahman. The accompanying soundtrack featured instrumentals from the original score and three songs written by Nikhita Gandhi, MC Heam and Dilshaad Shabbir Shaikh. The album was distributed through Zee Music Company, KM Musiq and Unisys and released on 2 April 2018 in CDs, followed by a vinyl edition under Sony DADC on 30 May.

== Background ==
Beyond the Clouds is the sophomore collaboration between Rahman and Majidi; the former had composed for Majidi's Muhammad: The Messenger of God (2015). From the inception, Majidi wanted Rahman to compose for the film, owing to his working relationship with Rahman during Muhammad: The Messenger of God and his rapport with the composer. He described him as a "creative and powerful" person who "always trying to experience and learn new things" and was quality oriented. He further added that his music team consisted of youngsters under 30, which would become interesting for Majidi to teach them and make their creativity awaken within. The film only featured three songs: "Ey Chhote Motor Chala", "Ala Re Ala" and the title track, while the accompanying album consisted of instrumentals from the film score.

== Release ==
The soundtrack to Beyond the Clouds was distributed by Rahman's KM Musiq and Zee Music Company for digital platforms, with digital deployement and exploitations by Unisys Infosolutions. The CDs and vinyl LPs of the album were distributed under the label of Sony Digital Audio Disc Corporation. The soundtrack was released in iTunes and CDs on 2 April 2018, while the vinyl editions were published on 30 May 2018. The song "Ey Chhote Motor Chala" was released as a single on 6 April 2018. It accompanied with a launch event held at a seashore near Bandra–Worli Sea Link with Ishaan, Malavika and Majidi. Ishaan further performed choreography of the song with its accompanying singer-songwriter MC Heam.

== Reception ==
The music received a negative review from Devarsi Ghosh of Scroll.in who summarized "Not a single tune from AR Rahman’s score for Majid Majidi’s Beyond The Clouds is likely to stay with the listener beyond five minutes, forget a day. Neither would you feel inclined to give the score a second try despite the belief among fans that you don’t get a Rahman album the first time. This isn’t because Rahman’s work in Beyond The Clouds is bad, but because nothing in the score sticks." Similarly, Debarati S Sen of The Times of India also noted that "Rahman's score for this film is replete with a tad bit overused orchestral compositions, that are invariably reminiscent of his earlier creations."

Film critics, however, reviewed it positively. While reviewing the score for Variety, the critic Guy Lodge noted that the score deserves its own directorial credit but it passes to push Rahman's Slumdog Millionaire vibes in two of its crucial sequences. Anisha Jhaveri of IndieWire summarized: "Composer A.R Rahman’s orchestral score, punctuated with piano and tabla interludes, makes for an enrapturing soundtrack in isolation, but its soaring, theatrical swells—not to mention one short, but superfluous and self-referential musical number as a nod to his impressive oeuvre—are ill-fitted to Majidi’s usually more delicate style." Deborah Young of The Hollywood Reporter felt the score is "overused and generally intrusive".

However, Filmfare based critic Devesh Sharma stated that "AR Rahman's background score isn't intrusive but subtly adds to the proceedings." Critic Anupama Chopra mentioned: "A. R. Rahman's soundtrack further underlines every note". Saibal Chatterjee of NDTV noted that Rahman is "fully into the swing of the film's spirit" complimenting the score. Rajeev Masand of News18 called it as a "mostly familiar score" from Rahman.

== Track listing ==
No.	Title	Performer(s)	Length
1.	"Son of Mumbai"	A. R. Rahman	03:34
2.	"The Game of Life"	A. R. Rahman	01:08
3.	"Twist of Destiny"	A. R. Rahman	01:56
4.	"The Gift"	A. R. Rahman	01:10
5.	"The Family Comes Home"	A. R. Rahman	02:05
6.	"Second Thoughts"	A. R. Rahman	02:57
7.	"Akshi"	A. R. Rahman	02:24
8.	"Hospital"	A. R. Rahman	03:02
9.	"Full Moon"	A. R. Rahman	02:19
10.	"Reunited"	A. R. Rahman	01:34
11.	"The Family Leaves"	A. R. Rahman	02:58
12.	"Beyond The Clouds"	Nikhita Gandhi	04:42
13.	"Holi"	A. R. Rahman	01:22
14.	"Ala Re Ala"	Dilshaad Shabbir Shaikh, Nikhita Gandhi, Srinivas Raghunathan, MC Heam	02:52
15.	"Ey Chhote Motor Chala"	MC Heam, Arjun Chandy, Sid Sriram	02:46
Total length:			36:59

== Credits ==
Credits adapted from A. R. Rahman's official website:

- Music composed and produced by: A. R. Rahman
- Music programming and additional arrangements: Ishaan Chhabra
- Additional programming: T. R. Krishna Chetan, Kumaran Sivamani, Dilshaad Shabbir Shaikh
- Music supervisor: Dilshaad Shabbir Shaikh
- Mixing: Pradvay Sivashankar, Ishaan Chhabra
- Musicians co-ordinator: Vijay Iyer, Noell James, T.M. Faizuddin, Abdul Haiyum
- Musicians' fixer: R. Samidurai

Musicians

- Piano: Adam Greig, Ishaan Chhabra
- Sitar: Asad Khan
- Tabla: Sai Shravanam, Chinna Prasad
- Shehnai: Omkar Dhumal
- Flute: Kamlakar
- Solo vocals: Nikhita Gandhi, Dilshaad Shabbir Shaikh
- Rap vocals and lyrics: MC Heam
- Additional vocals: Arjun Chandy, Sid Sriram
- Choir: Veena Murali, Deepthi Suresh, Niranjana Ramanan, Deepak Subrahmanyam, Shenbagaraj, Srinivas Raghunathan
- Choir Supervision: Arjun Chandy
- Strings: Chennai Strings Orchestra and Sunshine Orchestra
- String conductor: VJ Srinivasamurthy

FAME'S Macedonian Symphonic Orchestra

- Conductor: Oleg Kondratenko
- Sound engineer: Giorgi Hristovski
- Pro Tools operator : Atanas Babaleski
- Stage managers: Riste Trajkovski, Ilija Grkovski
- Orchestra co-ordinator: Andrew T. Mackay/Bohemia Junction Ltd.

Sound engineers

- Panchathan Record Inn, Chennai — Suresh Permal, Pradvay Sivashankar, T. R. Krishna Chetan, Jerry Vincent, Santhosh Dhayanidhi, Karthik Sekaran
- AM Studios, Chennai – S. Sivakumar, Pradeep Menon, Kannan Ganpat, Anantha Krishnan, Manoj Raman, Srinath Laksh, Karthik Mano
- AR Studios, Mumbai — R. Nitish Kumar, Dilshaad Shabbir Shaikh
