= Sarkar (soundtrack) =

2018 soundtrack album by A. R. Rahman

- Soundtrack album cover

Soundtrack album by A. R. Rahman
- Released: 2 October 2018
- Recorded: 2018
- Studio: Panchathan Record Inn and AM Studios, Chennai
- Genre: Feature film soundtrack
- Length: 22:29
- Language: Tamil
- Label: Sony Music India
- Producer: A. R. Rahman

A. R. Rahman chronology
Chekka Chivantha Vaanam (2018)	Sarkar (2018)	Sarvam Thaala Mayam (2019)

Singles from Sarkar
- 1. "Simtaangaran" Released: 24 September 2018; 2. "Oru Viral Puratchi" Released: 30 September 2018

Sarkar (transl. Government) is the soundtrack album for the 2018 Indian Tamil-language political action thriller film of the same name. The album composed by A. R. Rahman with lyrics written by Vivek, consists of five songs, two of which were released as singles prior to the audio launch, held on 2 October 2018.

== Overview ==
Sarkar is the fourth collaboration of A. R. Rahman with Vijay after Udhaya, Azhagiya Tamizh Magan and Mersal. All of the songs' lyrics were written by Vivek, marking his second collaboration with Rahman. This film also marks the second collaboration of Rahman with director A. R. Murugadoss, after composing for the Hindi film Ghajini (2008), which is a remake of the 2005 Tamil film of the same name.

"Simtaangaran" begins in Chennai Tamil sung by Bamba Bakya, followed by additional vocals provided by Vipin Aneja. The lead female vocal, provided by Aparna Narayanan, enters as the song's bridge, sung in chaste Tamil, contrasting Bamba and Vipin's usage of Chennai Tamil slang. This track was composed as a folk-number.

"Oruviral Puratchi" is a revolutionary number sung by A. R. Rahman, serving as a motivational song to stand up against electoral fraud, which was the main theme of the movie. Srinidhi Venkatesh also sings as a backing vocal along with additional singers such as Sathyaprakash, Nakul Abhyankar, Aravind Srinivas, Deepak and Santhosh.

"OMG Ponnu" is a peppy number, sung by Sid Sriram and Jonita Gandhi. The lyrics mainly consist of texting abbreviations, such as OMG, ILY, ASAP, GR8, L8R, and many more, serving as a modern song.

"Top Tucker" is sung by Mohit Chauhan. This song is deemed energetic and lively, showing off Sundar's(Vijay) prowess as corporate criminal fighting against the politicians in the movie.

"CEO in the House" is an energy techno track sung by Nakul Abhyankar and Blaaze. Shot in Las Vegas, this song consists of both English vocals by Blaaze and Tamil vocals by Nakul. The song mostly explains Sundar's fame and riches because of his job as a corporate monster, as shown by the lines: 'Play ada enai enai, venduma thunai thunai? Naan oru yevugunai, vendame vinai vinai.' (Do you want me as a companion to play? I'm a missile, don't mess with me.)

== Marketing and release ==
The first single track "Simtaangaran" sung by Bamba Bakya, Vipin Aneja and Aparna Narayanan was released on 24 September 2018. It was launched exclusively on Sun NXT, the online service of Sun TV, 30 minutes before launching the song on YouTube on 6:00 p.m. This song received predominantly mixed response. The audio rights of the film were acquired by Sony Music India, three days after the first single track was released. The second single track "Oru Viral Puratchi" was released on 30 September 2018. Sung by Rahman and Srinidhi Venkatesh, this song was well received.

The audio launch was held on 2 October 2018 at Sai Leo Muthu Indoor Stadium, Sri Sai Ram Engineering College, Chennai. The promotional music event featured dance performances for the songs in the background. The entire album was made available for download on the same day prior to the audio launch. The audio release event of the film was conducted in a much peculiar way, where for the very first time, the audience were given the privilege of launching the music album online by the means of the production company's website. The audio launch event held a live telecast aired on Sun TV, and on their exclusive paid service called SunNXT. Significant crew members took turns in giving an opinion of their experience being part of the project. Celebrities such as director Atlee turned up that night, as guests. Unlike other music events, Rahman opted not to perform. Instead, trained dancers put a rendition for his beats. The album was unofficially leaked without the team's consent, ruining the hype built up for album.

The lyric videos of all the songs were released on the YouTube channel of Sony Music South, on the day of audio launch. The video songs were released after the film's release.

== Reception ==
Indiaglitz gave a 4 out of 5 star rating, but cited: "Sarkar though rich in techno and electronic treatment, finds a winning combo with its amazing lyrics". Behindwoods gave it 2.75 out of 5 stars and stated: "A. R. Rahman goes full-on techno for Sarkar ". Firstpost stated "A. R. Rahman delivers an adequately enjoyable album in his fourth collaboration with Vijay". Studioflicks gave it 3.3/5 and said "A mix of local and western flavour from AR Rahman". Kolly Buzz rated it 3.8 out of 5 and quoted "AR Rahman escalates the musical platform of Vijay to next level through Sarkar".

== Track listing ==
The official track list was released a day before the launch via Sun Pictures official Twitter page.

All lyrics are written by Vivek.

No.	Title	Singer(s)	Length
1.	"Simtaangaran"	Bamba Bakya, Vipin Aneja, Aparna Narayanan	4:42
2.	"Oru Viral Puratchi"	A. R. Rahman, Srinidhi Venkatesh	5:28
3.	"Top Tucker"	Mohit Chauhan	3:43
4.	"OMG Ponnu"	Sid Sriram, Jonita Gandhi	4:44
5.	"CEO in the House"	Nakul Abhyankar, Blaaze	3:52
Total length:			22:29

== Release history ==
Sarkar [Original Motion Picture Soundtrack]
Region(s)	Date(s)	Format(s)	Label(s)	Ref.
Worldwide	2 October 2018	Digital download	Sony Music India	
India	30 December 2018	CD	Sony Music Entertainment	
US	30 December 2018	CD	Sony Music Entertainment	

== Album credits ==
Composer & Producer: A. R. Rahman

Lyrics: Vivek

=== Performers ===
A. R. Rahman, Srinidhi Venkatesh, Mohit Chauhan, Sid Sriram, Jonita Gandhi, Nakul Abhyankar, Blaaze, Bamba Bakya, Vipin Aneja, Aparna Narayanan

=== Musicians ===
- Indian Rhythm - T. Raja, Kumar, Vedha, Lakshmi Narayanan, Raju
- Flute - Kamalakar
- Guitars - Keba
- Shenai - Balesh
- Strings - Sunshine Orchestra
- Conducted by V J Srinivas Murthy
- Additional Programming - T. R. Krishna Chetan, Santhosh Dhayanidhi, Ishaan Chhabra, P. A. Deepak, Kumaran Sivamani, Pawan C H, Kaashif A H, Hari Dufusia

=== Personnel ===
- Additional Vocals: Sathyaprakash, Nakul Abhyankar, Aravind Srinivas, Deepak, Santhosh
- Vocal Arrangement: Arjun Chandy

=== Sound engineers ===
- Mixed by - P. A. Deepak (Simtaangaran & Top Tucker), T. R. Krishna Chetan (Oru Viral Puratchi & OMG Ponnu), Ishaan Chhabra (CEO in the House)
- Mastered by - Suresh Permal
- Mastered For iTunes - S. Sivakumar
- Musicians Coordinators - Noell James, Vijai Iyer, T. M. Faizudin, Abdul Haiyum
- Musicians Fixer - Samidurai R
