= Sarvam Thaala Mayam (soundtrack) =

Soundtrack album by A. R. Rahman
- Released: 12 January 2019
- Venue: Panchathan Record Inn and AM Studios
- Genre: Feature film soundtrack
- Length: 25:40
- Language: Tamil
- Label: Jio Music
- Producer: A. R. Rahman

A. R. Rahman chronology
Sarkar (2018)	Sarvam Thaala Mayam (2019)	Aadujeevitham (2019)

Singles from Sarvam Thaala Mayam
- 1. "Sarvam Thaala Mayam" Released: 30 November 2018; 2. "Maya Maya" Released: 6 December 2018; 3. "Peter Beatu Yethu" Released: 10 December 2018; 4. "Varalaama" Released: 14 December 2018

Sarvam Thaala Mayam is the soundtrack album for the 2019 Tamil film of the same name. The soundtrack consists of six feature songs along with instrumental tracks. The film's director Menon composed a song that Rahman curated.

== Development ==
Rahman began composing for the film in early 2016 and by May it was revealed that his two songs had been completed. As the film was a musical, Menon required the songs to be completed before production began and by November 2016, Rahman had finished composing nine songs for that film and composed parts of the background score. The lyrics were written by Madhan Karky, Arunraja Kamaraj and the late Na. Muthukumar, who worked in the film before his death in August 2016.

== Track listing ==
The official track list of songs was released long before the audio release by A. R. Rahman, in his Twitter page, on 19 November 2018.

No.	Title	Lyrics	Music	Artist(s)	Length
1.	"Sarvam Thaala Mayam"	Madhan Karky	A. R. Rahman	Haricharan, Arjun Chandy	5:04
2.	"Maya Maya"	Na. Muthukumar	A. R. Rahman	Chinmayi Sripada	4:21
3.	"Peter Beatu Yethu"	Arunraja Kamaraj	A. R. Rahman	G. V. Prakash Kumar, Sathyaprakash Dharmar, Arjun Chandy	3:39
4.	"Varalaama"	Madhan Karky	Rajiv Menon	Sriram Parthasarathy	4:46
5.	"Dingu Dongu"	Arunraja Kamaraj	A. R. Rahman	Bamba Bakya, Anthony Daasan	3:31
6.	"Maakelara Vichaaramu"	Tyagaraja	Tyagaraja	Bombay Jayashree	4:15
Total length:					25:40

== Background score ==
A.R. Rahman used many different instruments for this soundtrack. In "A Journey of Peter", Peter employed instruments from North Rajasthan and the Northeast. These musical instruments are part of the background score. Rahman and his ensemble Qutub-E-Kripa adopted Indian Regional music and Carnatic music. Rahman also used a western African musical instrument called Kora. It is a 21 string lute-bridge-harp extensively used in Africa.

== Album credits ==
=== Sound Engineers ===
- A R Rahman, Rasigan, A R Venkatesan
- Mixed by - P. A. Deepak, T R Krishna Chetan, Karthik Sekaran, Jerry Vincent
- Additional Programming - Santhosh Dhayanidhi
- Mastered by - Suresh Perumal
- MFiT mastered by - Suresh Perumal

=== Musicians ===
- Guitar - Sunil Milner, Keba Jeremiah
- Flute - Kamalakar
- Kanjira Player - B Shree Sundarkumar
- Sunshine Orchestra Conducted by VJ Srinivasamurthy
- Musicians Coordinators - Noell James, TM Faizuddin, Abdul Haiyum
- Musicians Fixer - R Samidurai
