= Axiom Verge =

2015 video game

- Developer: Thomas Happ Games
- Publisher: Thomas Happ Games
- Composer: Thomas Happ
- Engine: Microsoft XNA (Windows) / MonoGame (non-Windows platforms)
- Platforms: PlayStation 4, Linux, OS X, Windows, PlayStation Vita, Wii U, Xbox One, Nintendo Switch
- Release: PlayStation 4: NA: March 31, 2015; PAL: April 20, 2015; Linux, OS X, Windows: WW: May 14, 2015; PlayStation Vita: NA: April 19, 2016; PAL: April 20, 2016; Wii U: WW: September 1, 2016; Xbox One: WW: September 30, 2016; Nintendo Switch: WW: October 5, 2017
- Genre: Metroidvania
- Mode: Single-player

Axiom Verge is a Metroidvania video game by American indie developer Thomas Happ. The game was released in March 2015 in North America and April 2015 in Europe and Australia for PlayStation 4. It was released in May 2015 for Linux, OS X, and Windows. A PlayStation Vita version was released in April 2016. The Wii U and Xbox One versions were released in North America and Europe in September 2016. A Nintendo Switch version was released in October 2017.

A sequel, Axiom Verge 2, was released in 2021.

== Gameplay ==
Pre-release screenshot of Axiom Verge. The game's graphical style draws inspiration from the Metroid series of video games.

Axiom Verge is a side-scroller action-adventure game where the player controls Trace, a scientist who, after suffering a crippling injury, wakes up in an ancient and high-tech world. The game focuses on action and exploration, and features over 60 items and power-ups. The gameplay borrows elements from video games such as Metroid, Contra, Blaster Master, and Bionic Commando, among others.

== Plot ==
After a lab explosion knocks him out, a scientist named Trace Eschenbrenner awakens on the alien world of Sudra. He hears a voice speaking to him and fights his way to the source: a massive, mechanical head named Elsenova.

After Trace activates a power filter to partially restore Elsenova, she explains that the universe consists of many worlds which are separated by a storm called the Breach. Long ago, a man named Athetos came to Sudra through the Breach and eradicated its people using a pathogen. The only survivors of the pandemic were the Rusalki, a race of mechanical giants like Elsenova.

Trace activates a legion of drones to repair the Rusalki completely. On his way to a Rusalka named Ophelia, Trace hallucinates and collapses. While unconscious, Trace remembers that after the lab explosion, he remained on Earth and published theories that were ridiculed by the scientific community, giving him the nickname "Athetos". Ophelia confesses Trace is in fact another clone of him at a younger age. Trace expresses distrust of the Rusalka and demands to talk to Athetos, but Elsenova responds by remotely killing Trace.

Ophelia revives Trace, and they make an agreement where the Rusalki will let Athetos live if Trace merely shuts down his Breach attractor. Trace finds Athetos, who reveals that Sudra was once the gateway to a highly advanced alien world. By the time Athetos arrived however, the Sudrans had ceased to understand their role and now guarded their technology with religious reverence. Athetos planned to bring this alien technology back to Earth regardless, so he exterminated the Sudrans so they could not obstruct him. However, the Rusalki's survival halted Athetos' plan. Rather than let such powerful enemies roam free in the universe, Athetos attracted the Breach so that they could not leave Sudra.

Trace decides to fight Athetos and destroys the Breach attractor with a fully restored Elsenova's help. However, Elsenova claims Athetos is too dangerous and breaks her promise by killing him. The Rusalki tell Trace they will now return him home, and forcibly put him to sleep.

Trace awakens back on Earth after the lab accident, finding history has been altered so that the explosion did not injure him. However, Trace develops an obsession with returning to Sudra and quits his job to research it. If the player ends the game with a high completion rate, just as Trace is about to succeed on his research, Athetos himself appears. He tells Trace it is "time to wake up", and shoots him.

== Development and release ==
Axiom Verge is an independent project by Petroglyph Games engineer Tom Happ, who has worked on games such as End of Nations, NFL Street, and the Tiger Woods PGA Tour series. Happ also worked on a Game Boy Advance project named Orn, a small Metroid fangame. He is the sole developer, artist, and musician of the game, and began work on it in March 2010 as a side project.

An alpha build of the game was submitted to the 2012 Dream Build Play challenge on May 15. The game was originally expected to be released for Microsoft Windows and Xbox 360 in 2013, but was ultimately delayed. In 2014, Axiom Verge was included in Indie Statik's list of Top 100 Most Anticipated Indie Games of 2014. In April 2014, it was announced that Axiom Verge would be released for PlayStation 4 and PlayStation Vita in early 2015. On May 14, 2015, Axiom Verge was released for Linux, Microsoft Windows, and OS X. The PlayStation Vita version of the game was released in North America on April 19, 2016, and in Europe the following day.

In March 2015, it was revealed that a Wii U version had been initially considered, but was not possible at the time due to technical issues, particularly with the game's underlying framework, MonoGame, lacking native support for Nintendo's platform. However, Nintendo were interested in having Axiom Verge come to the Wii U. In March 2016, it was confirmed the game would arrive on Wii U, and was slated for a September 1, 2016 release in North America and Europe. Thomas Happ originally intended to include an unlockable Samus Aran costume in the Wii U version, but Nintendo did not approve. At one point, a Nintendo 3DS version of Axiom Verge was also considered. Happ stated after the Nintendo Switch was revealed that he hoped Nintendo would send him a developer kit so he could begin porting Axiom Verge to the Switch. A port was later confirmed alongside the special, physical Multiverse Edition.

In October 2015, Thomas Happ Games teamed up with IndieBox, a monthly subscription box service, to create a custom-designed, physical release of Axiom Verge. The limited, individually numbered, collector's edition included a flash drive with a DRM-free copy of the game, official soundtrack, instruction manual, Steam key, and several custom-made collectible items. High demand for this physical version caused the IndieBox website to crash.

Six years after its initial release, Axiom Verge received a downloadable content update in 2021, featuring a gameplay mode that randomizes item locations. The update was a collaboration between Happ and Axiom Verge's speedrunning community, who had unofficially developed a mod for the game mode and were looking to officially add it to the game.

=== Multiverse Edition ===
In February 2017, Spanish game distributor BadLand Games announced they were collaborating with Thomas Happ to publish Axiom Verge as a retail title. In addition to a standard retail release only for the PlayStation 4, a special, limited Axiom Verge: Multiverse Edition was to be available for the PlayStation 4, PlayStation Vita, and Wii U during Q2 2017 in both North America and Europe. The Multiverse Edition included a physical copy, a deluxe booklet with developer commentary and art, a double-sided poster, and a making-of documentary on Blu-ray (initially announced as being on a DVD). BadLand Games expected to announce the Multiverse Edition for other platforms later on. In June 2017, it was confirmed that the Multiverse Edition was going to release worldwide in the following August, and will also be available for the Nintendo Switch with exclusive soundtrack CD. However, the release was delayed to October 17, 2017. That date was not kept either, and ultimately the Multiverse Edition was released on November 21, 2017, in North America. The European release happened on January 29, 2018. A physical edition of the Wii U version was distributed by Limited Run Games on March 29, 2019.

== Reception ==
Reception

Aggregate scores
Aggregator	Score
Metacritic	PS4: 84/100; PC: 80/100; VITA: 78/100; WIIU: 89/100; XONE: 85/100; NS: 87/100
OpenCritic	83% recommend

Review scores
Publication	Score
Destructoid	7.5/10
Game Informer	9.25/10
GameRevolution	4/5
GameSpot	8/10
Giant Bomb	5/5
IGN	7.9/10

The game received generally favorable reviews upon release, with praise particularly directed to its setting, weapons, boss battles, control, upgrades and secrets featured. Aggregating review website Metacritic gave the PlayStation 4 version 84/100 based on 61 reviews.

Jeff Gerstmann from Giant Bomb gave the game a perfect score, praising its huge variety of weapons, as well as its rewarding and worthwhile upgrades. He also praised the game for encouraging players to reach 100% completion, the audio and visuals for evolving in meaningful ways while being similar to those of the 8-bit and 16-bit eras. Regarding the difficulty of the game, he stated that it "makes things challenging without making them overtly frustrating". He summarized the review by saying that "If you've ever been into this sort of action-adventure game, Axiom Verge is positively terrific."

Peter Brown from GameSpot gave the game an 8/10 rating, praising its high replay value, surprising and rewarding story, occasionally breathtaking scenery as well as the setting, which he stated "instills a strong mixture of curiosity and dread". The game's secrets, large selection of weapons and soundtracks were also praised. He also particularly praised one of the weapons featured, the Address Disruptor, calling it "one of the most interesting weapons or tools that I've ever seen in a game." He summarized the review by saying that "Axiom Verge is a game that's easy to fall in love with because it hits so many high notes. It takes the Metroidvania model and adds layers of ingenuity that are in a league all of their own. It's not a stretch to say that Axiom Verge is better than the games that inspired it, because it's so inventive and thoughtfully crafted."

Marty Sliva from IGN gave the game a 7.9/10. While praising its satisfying character progression, challenging boss encounters, responsive control and great sense of movement and combat, he criticized the forgettable story, characters that can't be related to and the map-design, which never evolves throughout the game and discourages exploration. He added that the game doesn't have enough distant and memorable regions. He also criticized the game for being too familiar with the Metroid series and for lacking a clear objective.

Entertainment Weekly magazine has rated the game "A−" and figured the game on its "The 10 Best Games of 2015" list.

Thomas Ella of Hardcore Gamer gave the game a 4/5 and described it as "a 2D side-scrolling game with a vast, open world divided into distinct rooms, an array of weapons and power-ups and a map screen laid out in a grid for easy tracking of where you've been and where you might need to go next."

In a review of Axiom Verge in Black Gate, Matt Drought said "Axiom Verge is a blast to play. It is worthy successor to carry on the mantle of games past. Journeying through the world of Sudra, fighting enemies, exploring new areas, and gathering new weapons with different powers is very enjoyable. The game challenges you to survive this world filled with enemies and traps trying to kill you, and leaves you with a sense of accomplishment, especially after defeating a particularly hard Boss. As a sole developer, Thomas Happ has created a game that brings the player in with great gameplay, an interesting premise, and a fantastic soundtrack."

=== Awards ===
List of awards and nominations
Award	Category	Result	Ref.
The Game Awards 2015	Best Independent Game	Nominated	

== Sequel ==
During the 2019 Indie World presentation, Happ revealed that a sequel is in development, titled Axiom Verge 2, and was planned to release for Nintendo Switch in fall 2020. In October 2020, it was announced that the game was delayed to the first half of 2021. In May 2021, the game was then delayed to Q3 2021. The game was released on August 11, 2021.
