= Chekka Chivantha Vaanam (soundtrack) =

2018 soundtrack album by A. R. Rahman

- Soundtrack album cover

Soundtrack album by A. R. Rahman
- Released: 5 September 2018
- Recorded: 2017–2018
- Studios: Panchathan Record Inn and AM Studios, Chennai; Panchathan Hollywood Studios, Los Angeles
- Genre: Feature film soundtrack
- Length: 29:26
- Language: Tamil
- Label: Sony Music India
- Producer: A. R. Rahman

A. R. Rahman chronology
Sanju (2018)	Chekka Chivantha Vaanam (2018)	Sarkar (2018)
External audio
- Official Tamil Audio Jukebox on YouTube

Singles from Chekka Chivantha Vaanam
- 1. "Mazhai Kuruvi" Released: 1 September 2018; 2. "Bhoomi Bhoomi" Released: 1 September 2018

Chekka Chivantha Vaanam is the soundtrack album, composed by A. R. Rahman with song lyrics by Vairamuthu to the 2018 Tamil film of the same name. The film is directed by Mani Ratnam.

The album consist of seven songs out of which "Mazhai Kuruvi" and "Bhoomi Bhoomi" served as the lead singles. Composition of the soundtrack began in December 2017. The songs in the film are symbolic in nature and are fit into the situations. Two poems from Vairamuthu's book Peiyana Peiyum Mazhai have been re-written into song lyrics, one being "Mazhai Kuruvi".

The promotional music event featured live performances of the lead singles as well as all the songs in the soundtrack album. The soundtrack album was released on 5 September 2018 under the Sony Music India record label.

== Development ==
A. R. Rahman, Vairamuthu and Mani Ratnam began with music sessions for the soundtrack in December 2017. According to lyricist Vairamuthu, the provisions for the music and language in Chekka Chivantha Vaanam is limited because of the action genre. Rahman and his compositions were set as if they were playing "flute in a war field". For the songs in the film, Mani Ratnam had chosen two poem's from the Vairamuthu's book Peiyena Peiyum Mazhai. These poems were written into song lyrics, one of the songs is "Mazhai Kuruvi"sb.

As per Vairamuthu, the songs in are symbolic in the nature that they talk indirectly about the situations. The track "Mazhai Kuruvi" — is about a man who was enjoying the sight of a sparrow perched on a rock on a gloomy day. As it rains, the man rushes into the comforts of his home and wonders how the sparrow would be suffering due to the downpour. However, as per the lyricist the interpretation is that the sparrow is enjoying itself and wondering why the man isn't taking delight in something nature was giving him. The music sessions were held in Goa. Rahman recalled: "At that time I was also working on my own movie production 99 Songs. I composed 10 ideas within two days and asked him (Mani Ratnam) to choose whichever he liked.” One of these compositions was the music for the track "Mazhai Kuruvi".

The song "Bhoomi Bhoomi" plays four times in a song structure and was composed as a core theme of the film. "Bhoomi Bhoomi" was not originally recorded for the film. The track "Sevandhu Pochu Nenju" highlights the mistakes a man commits whereas "Kalla Kalavaani" talks about a carefree woman. "Kalla Kalavaani" was used in the film's trailer in the portion that introduced character Ethi (Silambarasan). The song has rap lyrics by Lady Kash and addressed to and in praise of a fraud or a thief. Vairamuthu's lyrics recall the Latin phrase Veni vidi vici (he came, he saw, he conquered).

Due to prepone release date of the film, Rahman set up all his musical equipments in the hotel room and composed the original score post his live tour shows during weekends. Recording of the original score was completed by early September 2018.

== Release ==
The promotional music event for the film was held in Chennai on 5 September 2018, with the presence of the film's cast and crew, and featured a musical stage performance by Rahman and his musical team. Out of these, the first two were released on digital music download platforms four days before the launch on 1 September 2018. The launch event was hosted by Chinmayi and Karthik.

== Reception ==
V Lakshmi of The Times of India writes, "The album has two songs, and while the soundscape is different, the underlying emotion seems to be common — celebrating life". Priyanka Sundar of Hindustan Times who gave track by track review of the singles performed live; stated: ""Bhoomi Bhoomi" is electric and soulful at same time, "Mazhai Kuruvi", a slow number that is all about juxtaposing nature and love". Manoj Kumar of The Indian Express stated "Mazhai Kuruvi" as a happy and breezy song whereas "Bhoomi Bhoomi", contrary, lonely and heartbreaking. Mridula Ramaguda of Firstpost reviewed the first four singles of the album noted: "AR Rahman-Mani Ratnam unite for another masterful soundtrack, With many parts of the album alone, the director-composer duo manage to keep their trademark alive. [...] the duo experiment with new genres and include a more western influence with Chekka Chivantha Vaanam's songs."

News18 in its review stated: "A.R. Rahman's score and songs work in tandem to elevate the overall mood of the film. Ratnam's use of the Bhoomi track in the climax is nothing short of a masterstroke, assuring that it's the return of the master to his glorious form." Anupama Subramanian of Deccan Chronicle wrote: "Music by AR Rahman (and lyrics by Vairamuthu) is relegated to the backgrounds, but he’s on point as ever. ARR’s BGM elevates the entire proceedings top notch." However, M. Suganth of The Times of India stated: "[...]Rahman's score, [...] tries a bit too hard to shoe-in songs in the place of a background score." Manoj Kumar R of The Indian Express pointed: "And what Ratnam and composer AR Rahman have done with the film’s music is a surprise. The director has not used any of Rahman’s songs in its entirety or spent money picturizing the beautiful numbers. He uses the songs in small doses throughout the film to lift up the scenes further. Rahman’s music is a character in itself in the movie." Vivek MV of Deccan Herald called Rahman's music as riveting. Nandini Ramnath of Scroll stated: "[...]AR Rahman’s mostly forgettable tunes [stay] to the background and only Bhoomi Bhoomi soares in key scenes."

== Track listing ==
=== Original ===
Chekka Chivantha Vaanam – Standard Edition Disc (India)
No.	Title	Lyrics	Singer(s)	Length
1.	"Sevandhu Pochu Nenju"	Vairamuthu	Arjun Chandy, D. Sathyaprakash, Sunitha Sarathy	5:10
2.	"Kalla Kalavaani"	Vairamuthu, Lady Kash	Shakthisree Gopalan, Lady Kash	4:11
3.	"Bhoomi Bhoomi"	Vairamuthu	Shakthisree Gopalan	4:38
4.	"Mazhai Kuruvi"	Vairamuthu	A. R. Rahman	5:49
5.	"Hayati"	Shiv	Shiv, Mayssa Karaa	2:57
6.	"Madura Marikozhundhae"	Traditional	Swetha Mohan, Anuradha Sriram, Aparna Narayanan, Madhumitha Shankar	3:03
Total length:				25:59

Chekka Chivantha Vaanam – Digital Download Edition (Worldwide)
No.	Title	Lyrics	Singer(s)	Length
7.	"Praaptham"	Vairamuthu	A. R. Rahman, Karthik	3:35
Total length:				29:26

=== Telugu ===
Nawab
No.	Title	Lyrics	Singer(s)	Length
1.	"Segalu Chimmuthondhi"	Sirivennela Seetharama Sastry	Nakul Abhyankar, D. Sathyaprakash, Sunitha Sarathy	5:10
2.	"Nannu Nammanee"	Sirivennela Seetharama Sastry	Shakthisree Gopalan, Lady Kash	4:11
3.	"Bhaga Bhaga"	Rakendu Mouli	Shakthisree Gopalan	4:38
4.	"Neeli Kanumallo"	Sirivennela Seetharama Sastry	Nakul Abhyankar	5:49
5.	"Hayati"	Shiv	Shiv, Mayssa Karaa	2:57
6.	"Manasaa Nannu Vadhili"	Sirivennela Seetharama Sastry	Anuradha Sriram, Pooja AV, Aparna Narayanan	3:03
7.	"Praaptham"	Rakendu Mouli	A. R. Rahman, Sid Sriram	3:35
Total length:				29:26

== Album credits ==
Credits adapted from official page of Sony Music India.

- A. R. Rahman - Music (All tracks), Arrangement (All tracks), Composer (All tracks), Vocals ("Mazhai Kuruvi")
- Mayssa Karaa - Arabic lyrics ("Hayati")
- Shivang "Shiv" Vaishnav - Rap lyrics ("Hayati")
- Keba Jeremiah - Bass guitar ("Bhoomi Bhoomi")
- George Doering - Charango, Mandolin, Ukulele ("Mazhai Kuruvi")
- Kamalakar - Flute ("Mazhai Kuruvi")
- Anupam - Orchestra Conductor (Sunshine Orchestra) ("Mazhai Kuruvi")
- T. R. Krishna Chetan - Mixing (All tracks)
- Ishaan Chhabra - Mixing ("Sevandhu Nenje Pochu")
- Suresh Permal - Mastering, Sound Engineer (All tracks)
- S Sivakumar - Apple iTunes Mastering, Sound Engineer (All tracks)
- Pawan CH - Sound Engineer, Additional Programming ("Sevandhu Nenje Pochu", "Hayati", "Kalla Kalavaani", "Praaptham")
- Karthik Sekaran - Sound Engineer (All tracks)
- Jerry Vincent - Sound Engineer (All tracks)
- Santosh Dhayanidhi - Sound Engineer (All tracks)
- Vinay Sridhar - Sound Engineer (All tracks)
- Srinidhi Venkatesh - Sound Engineer, Music Supervisor (All tracks)
- Kumaran Sivamani - Programmer
- Noell James - Music Co-ordinator (All tracks)
- T. M. Faizuddin - Music Co-ordinator (All tracks)
- R. Samidurai - Musicians' Fixer (All tracks)
- B. Velavan - Musicians' Fixer (All tracks)

== Release history ==
List of release dates, showing region, edition(s), format(s), label(s) and reference(s).
Region(s)	Date(s)	Edition(s)	Format(s)	Catalog Code(s)	Label(s)	Ref.
Worldwide	5 September 2018	Digital Edition	Digital download	N/A	Sony Music	
India	5 November 2018	Standard Edition	CD	8907011129602	Sony DADC	
US	5 November 2018	Standard Edition	CD	ASIN B07JG5RBX2	Sony DADC	
UK	5 November 2018	Collector's Edition	CD	ULCD 1014	Ultra	
