= Axiom Verge 2 =

2021 video game

- Developer: Thomas Happ Games
- Publisher: Thomas Happ Games
- Composer: Thomas Happ
- Platforms: Nintendo Switch; PlayStation 4; Windows; PlayStation 5; Linux; Xbox One
- Release: Switch, PS4, Windows; August 11, 2021; PlayStation 5 August 9, 2022; Linux; August 11, 2022; Xbox One; July 11, 2023
- Genre: Metroidvania
- Mode: Single-player

Axiom Verge 2 is a Metroidvania video game by American indie developer Thomas Happ Games. It is the sequel to Axiom Verge and was released on August 11, 2021, for Nintendo Switch, PlayStation 4 and Windows (exclusive to the Epic Games Store client). The game was later released on Steam and PlayStation 5 in August 2022. It was also ported to Xbox One in July 2023.

The game follows Indra Chaudhari, a billionaire who receives a mysterious message telling her to go to Antarctica if she wishes to see her missing daughter again. It received generally favorable reviews from critics.

== Gameplay ==
Just like its predecessor, Axiom Verge 2 is a side-scroller action-adventure game. The player controls Indra Chaudhari, a mysterious billionaire. The gameplay borrows elements from games from the 1980s and 1990s such as Metroid, Contra, Blaster Master, and Bionic Commando, among others. The game focuses on action and exploration, and features many items, enemies, and power-ups. Most of Indra's power-ups come in the form of "Arms", entities with various powers. Indra battles enemies either with weapons such as axes and boomerangs or by hacking them to alter their behaviors. Her attributes such as health and attack power can be upgraded freely using Apocalypse Flasks scattered around the map. Unusually for a Metroidvania, most bosses are optional and can be bypassed with no consequence to progression.

Most of Axiom Verge 2 is set in the world of Kiengir (a name derived from Sumerian 𒆠𒂗𒄀 ki-en-gi /kengir/ "Sumer") , which is split into two parallel dimensions known as the "Overworld" and "Breach" respectively. The Overworld is larger and appears largely natural and akin to Earth, while the Breach appears more digital and can only be accessed by Indra in the form of an artificial drone. Indra is frequently required to move through the Breach to progress to its equivalent locations in the Overworld, and vice versa.

== Plot ==
In 2053, Indra Chaudhari, founder and CEO of the Globe 3 megacorporation, purchases Hammond Corp after its owner Elizabeth Hammond vanishes while carrying out research in Jones Station, Antarctica. The acquisition includes Hammond's original prototype for ansibles capable of zero-latency communication. Upon powering up the prototype, Indra receives a message from an unknown source telling her to come to Antarctica if she wishes to see her missing daughter again.

Indra explores Jones Station and is teleported via a cargo lift to a reality she does not recognize. She drowns in rising water, but finds herself reconstructed at a mysterious altar by an entity that introduces herself as Amashilama. Amashilama is an "Arm" – "an intelligent collection of machines" – that has bonded with Indra's body.

Indra finds the base camps of Hammond's research team. The researchers explain that they were studying this world – Kiengir – with Hammond until robots appeared and attacked the researchers, killing most of them and leaving the survivors isolated from each other. Furthermore, the cargo lift was destroyed so that it could no longer be used to leave Kiengir, and a group of Kazakh scientists from nearby Sagimbayev Station were never heard from again.

Indra acquires more Arms such as the sentient Damu, who can transfer Indra's consciousness to a small drone. She is horrified to learn that Damu was converted as a young child. The unknown person behind the ansible messages eventually reveals herself as Hammond. Indra also encounters the Lamassu, a highly advanced AI that released the robots to exterminate all humans on Kiengir and destroy the cargo lift. It explains that its actions are to prevent cross-contamination between separate universes, such as those of Earth and Kiengir.

Amashilama tricks Indra into giving the former control over the latter's body and trapping Indra's consciousness in Damu's drone form. Indra later acquires a humanoid replacement body and does battle with Amashilama, but both parties find that the advanced technology built by the native Sagiga will always prevent them from dying. The Lamassu explains Amashilama's plans: she will acquire an army of war machines known as Siuna and use them to raze the mother world A'ansur. Amashilama believes this will liberate Kiengir, but in actuality it would destroy both worlds and many others including Earth. Although it still distrusts Indra, the Lamassu decides Amashilama is a bigger threat, and gives Indra the mission to stop her using a single Siuna on Kiengir.

Indra finds both her daughter Samara and Hammond between universes, where they are trapped in a form of detention with countless other people. Hammond lets Indra speak with her daughter, but does not tell Indra how they ended up there out of concern for her mental health. Indra later finds Hammond's body on Kiengir; she had become trapped during the Lamassu's initial assault and died long before she could send her initial message to Indra. Amashilama assumes control of the Siuna Indra was pointed to and leaves the latter's original body limp on the ground. Seeing the apparently dead original Indra, the new one questions her own identity.

The new Indra prepares to a rig a powerful Breach bomb that will destroy the portal from Kiengir to A'ansur, but Amashilama intervenes and traps her in a force field after a battle. The original Indra suddenly arrives and attacks Amashilama, giving the new one time to arm the bomb and escape. The resulting explosion completely destroys both Amashilama, her Siuna, the old Indra, and the portal to A'ansur. The new Indra realizes she only wants to turn Damu back into a physical being and no longer cares about returning to Earth, and so joins the Kazakhs, who unbeknownst to the Hammond Corp team have transcended humanity. Pondering the death of the old Indra, the new one decides she can no longer call herself by that name but has become something else.

If the player finished the game with a high completion percentage, a post-credits scene shows the old Indra reuniting with Samara in the afterlife.

== Development ==
Development on Axiom Verge 2 began in November 2015 after some months of brainstorming. During the development of its predecessor, Happ created ideas for seven different games and chose the one that seemed the most interesting to him, "I would never have time to do [the other titles] but Axiom Verge 2's story seemed like the most interesting one to continue with if I did get the chance to make it".

Enemies were designed to be less "spongy" and to have more ways for the player to approach them. The game incorporates elements of Sumerian culture due to it being the first one with a written language. The visuals were tweaked to be brighter and focus more on outdoor locales due to Happ becoming bored with the repetition of making the same type of art. The sequel was inspired by titles like Prey, The Legend of Zelda, Horizon Zero Dawn, and Shadow of the Colossus. When writing the plot, Happ intended for it to reveal information about the series' universe while simultaneously serving as a self-contained story.

Mayssa Karaa provided vocals for the music, which Happ branched out into the folk and fantasy genres while continuing the electronic style of the first game.

== Reception ==
Reception

Aggregate scores
Aggregator	Score
Metacritic	PC: 78/100; NS: 76/100; PS4: 75/100
OpenCritic	74% recommend

Review scores
Publication	Score
Destructoid	8/10
Game Informer	7.75/10
GameSpot	7/10
IGN	7/10
Jeuxvideo.com	14/20
Nintendo Life	9/10
Nintendo World Report	8.5/10
PC Gamer (US)	87/100

The game received "generally favorable" reviews on Metacritic.

Tom Sykes of PC Gamer praised the title, calling it a "bold and ambitious sequel" that builds on the work of its predecessor. Eric Van Allen of Destructoid gave it a positive review, saying that it "feels different and very much its own". Mitch Vogel of Nintendo Life called the Nintendo Switch version "an impressively high-quality experience from stem to stern". Tristan Ogilvie of IGN enjoyed the world of the game, "Axiom Verge 2 is a dual-dimensional Metroidvania that's engaging to explore despite its one-dimensional combat and underwhelming boss fights."

GameSpot liked the new biomes present, describing them as "suitably distinct from one another" and additionally gave praise to the new world saying, "The Breach's ingenuity is derived from the way it challenges you to solve navigational puzzles". Polygon felt the "existential kind of isolation" that the story brought to the game gave Axiom Verge its "most powerful moments". Nintendo World Report liked the infect mechanic, which let the player take over mechanical objects, enjoying how it brought "another layer to combat".

NME also praised the environments, but conversely criticized the focus on exploration, saying that it made the gameplay feel flat. Game Informer's Matt Miller felt the size of the map could overwhelm the player, and criticized the lack of variety, saying that "the many interconnected corridors begin to blend into a long and confusing blur". Rock Paper Shotgun felt the high use of backtracking and poor objective placement led the game to be unnecessarily confusing to the player.
