= Ruby Ruby =

Song by A. R. Rahman

from the album Sanju: Music from the Motion Picture
- Language: Hindi
- Released: 13 June 2018
- Recorded: 2018
- Studio: Panchathan Record Inn, Chennai
- Genre: Filmi, rock, Pop
- Length: 4:45
- Label: T-Series
- Composer: A. R. Rahman
- Lyricist: Irshad Kamil
- Producer: A. R. Rahman

Music video
- "Ruby Ruby" on YouTube

"Ruby Ruby" is a song from the 2018 Hindi film Sanju. The song's lyrics were written by Irshad Kamil, composed by A. R. Rahman and sung by Shashwat Singh, Poorvi Koutish.The song's music video is pictured upon actor Ranbir Kapoor and actress Sonam Kapoor. The song was released on 13 June 2018, and the music video was released in YouTube on 27 June 2018.

The song was nominated at the Asian Film Awards for Best Original Music.

== Background ==
The song belongs to a completely different space and has the hints of pop in it. The video of Ruby Ruby depicts Sanju's 'quest for love as he lets his imagination run wild.

Song starts with Rahman's music, high bass over guitar tune, and then sanju (Ranbir Kapoor) says "Har drug addict koi na koi bahana khojta hai drugs wapas shuru karne ke liye, mera bahana Ruby thi" (transl. "Every drug addict finds an excuse to start again, my excuse was Ruby")

== Critical reception ==
- Scroll.in: "Composed by AR Rahman, Ruby Ruby, the third single from Rajkumar Hirani’s Sanju, echoes the classic Taal song Ramta Jogi in more ways than one – the heavy bass guitars, the languid but thumping beat, and the additional percussion reminiscent of Sivamani's most energetic works with the composer."
- The Indian Express: "The song grows on the listener with repeat hearings which is the case with most Rahman songs. With these three songs, one can certainly gauge that the Sanju album will have a track for every mood."

== Credits and personnel ==
- A.R. Rahman – producer, composer, songwriter and arrangement
- Irshad Kamil – lyricist
- Shashwat Singh – singer
- Poorvi Koutish – singer
- Keba Jeremiah – bass, guitar
- Chris Jason – guitar
- Raja & Kumar – rhythm and percussion
- VJ Srinivasamurthy – Sunshine Orchestra conductor

Technical personnel

- Additional programming: Ishaan Chhabra
- Mixing: Ishaan Chhabra & Deepak P A mastered by Suresh Permal
- Sound engineers at Panchathan Record Inn (Chennai): Suresh Permal, Ishaan Chhabra, Santhosh Dhayanidhi, TR Krishna Chetan, Karthik Sekaran, Jerry Vincent, Kumaran Sivamani, Kaashif Rafiq, Pawan Chilamkurthi
- Sound engineers at AR Studios (Mumbai): R Nitish Kumar, Dilshaad Shaikh
- Sound engineers at AM Studios (Chennai): S.Sivakumar, Pradeep Menon, Kannan Ganpat, Manoj
- Musicians fixer: R Samidurai
- Musician coordinators: Vijay Iyer, Noel James, TM Faizuddin, Abdul Haiyum
