= Mayssa Karaa =

American singer

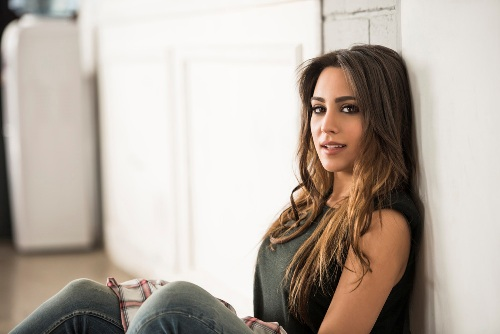

Background information
- Born: 1989 (age 36–37)
- Origin: Beirut, Lebanon
- Genres: Indie pop, alternative rock, Arabic
- Occupations: Singer, songwriter
- Instrument: Vocals
- Years active: 2010–present
- Label: Sony Classical
- Website: mayssakaraa.com
Mayssa Karaa
- Education: Berklee College of Music

Mayssa Karaa, also known professionally as Mayssa (born 1989; Arabic: ميسا قرعة), is a Lebanese American singer-songwriter currently based in Los Angeles, California. She was the featured vocalist on the Arabic version of "White Rabbit" on the American Hustle soundtrack. which was nominated to the Grammy Awards as "Best Compilation Soundtrack" for Visual Media in 2015.

Her song "Hayati" produced by Oscar-winner AR Rahman hit No. 1 on Apple music India while being featured on the soundtrack of the Indian film Chekka Chivantha Vaanam (directed by Mani Ratnam).

She launched her first single, "Call Me a Stranger", and music video from her full-length English solo debut, Simple Cure, in June 2019.

== Early life ==
Mayssa Karaa was born in Beirut, Lebanon during a time of civil unrest in 1989, she is the daughter of Andre Karaa, a civil engineer and Najwa Karaa, who works with numerous charitable organizations to help people in need. Mayssa has a younger sister named Rayya.

Mayssa began singing at the age of seven. She attended the French Jesuit Catholic school "College Notre Dame do Jamhour". It was here that her love of performing blossomed when her choir director selected her out of 100 voices to solo at the year-end concert. Karaa went on to attend the Conservatory of Beirut, studying vocal performance, piano, and music theory. During this time, she also performed across Beirut, singing at events for non-profit charities, including Lions Club, UNESCO, the Red Cross and The Lebanese School of the Blind and Deaf.

In 2006, Lebanon was again engaged in conflict, and Karaa and her family moved to Boston, Massachusetts. In Boston, Mayssa followed in her father's footsteps and studied civil engineering. But, on the eve of graduating, her father encouraged her to pursue her vocal talent. In 2008, she enrolled in the Berklee College of Music where she delved into different genres of music including pop, rock, middle Eastern, Eastern European music and classical opera. As a result, Mayssa performs in multiple languages including English, Arabic, Persian, Italian, French, Serbian, Bulgarian and Greek.

She married Yarub Smairat in a civil ceremony in Abu Dhabi in November 2025. The couple then celebrated their religious wedding in Lebanon in January 2026.

== Music career ==
=== 2012–2014 Beginnings with Mayssa Karaa ===
Karaa began studying Arabic music under composer and instrumentalist Simon Shaheen while in her final year at Berklee, and soon became a guest vocalist in a few of his concerts in the United States and Canada.

She was featured in a PBS special about the life of the great tenor "Enrico Caruso" filmed in Naples, Italy, titled "Enrico Caruso: His Life, His Music, His City” featuring Italian tenor Pasquale Esposito with whom she toured in the United States singing Italian Opera. The documentary also featured world-renowned singer Placido Domingo.

She graduated Berklee in 2012, and that year joined the Berklee World Strings Orchestra to sing a Persian piece "The Passion of Rumi" by Hafez Nazeri, before touring with the group to a number of American cities.

=== 2014–18 Continued success and solo endeavors ===
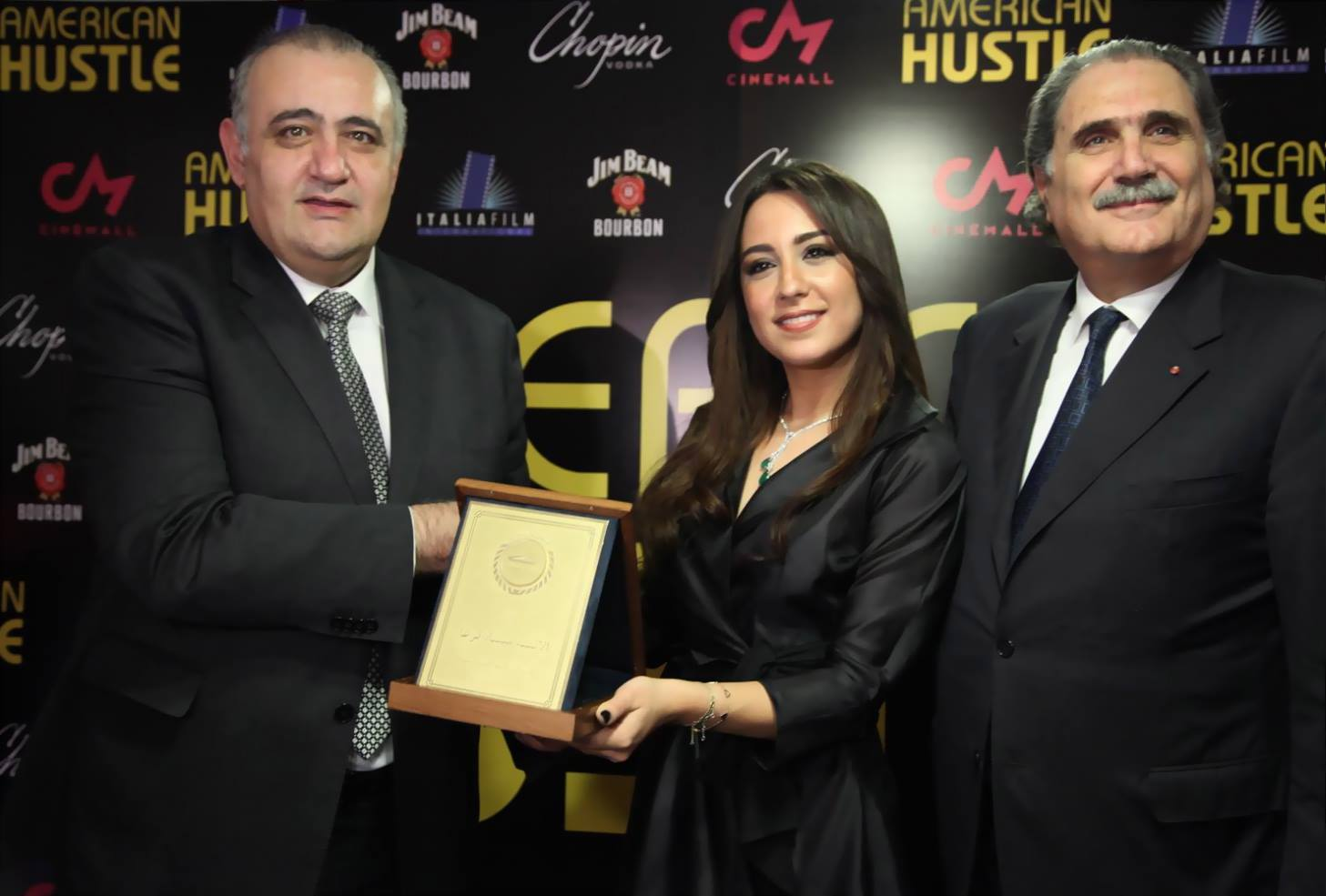
Mayssa Karaa at the premier of American Hustle in Beirut

Karaa sang the Arabic version of "White Rabbit" on the American Hustle Soundtrack, which was released on Sony Classical in 2013, a psychedelic song originally by The Great Society (recorded 1966) and made famous by American band Jefferson Airplane, who released it in 1967. Karaa was in Beirut at the time without access to a studio, she recorded her audition on her iPhone. A week after her audition Karaa flew to Los Angeles to record the track produced by Mark Batson.

The song is used in the scene where Victor Tellegio (played by Robert De Niro) reveals he can speak Arabic, and it is the only song recorded specifically for the film. Heather Phares of Allmusic called Karaa's interpretation "otherworldly," stating that the track "is so striking that it's one of the finest songs on an album packed with big names." The Los Angeles Times stated that her version "outdoes the original."

American Hustle went on to win a Golden Globe and was nominated for several Oscar Awards. Mayssa performed the song at the film's premiere in several cities, including the Dubai International Film Festival, where it premiered in Dubai. In February 2014, Lebanon's Cultural Minister Gaby Layoun gave Lebanon's National Cultural Award to Karaa at the American Hustle premiere held in Beirut. Layoun stated, "She has created a significant artistic bridge between our culture and audiences around the world. She has made an impact both in Hollywood and as a role model for young women here and abroad. In a world filled with sad days, this is one that brings us great joy and pride for Lebanon."

International families might identify her with "The Arabic Alphabet Song" from Iftah Ya Simsim the first international co-production of the American children's television series Sesame Street created in the Arab world which generated 38 million YouTube views. She's worked on 2 other songs with them "Children are the world" and "The four seasons."

Melding Arabic influences into Western music is MAYSSA's forte: notable recordings in her catalog include a version of Pink Floyd's “Comfortably Numb” accompanied by the band's Scott Page.

MAYSSA traveled to Detroit, Michigan to honor Rock & Roll Hall of Fame legend Bob Seger. Fronting a band organized by the distinguished producer Don Was, she performed a haunting version of Seger's "Turn the Page" in both English and Arabic during the 22nd Annual "Concert Of Colors"in 2014 at the Orchestra Hall in Detroit, Michigan.

=== 2018–present, Simple Cure ===
In 2018, one of her original song, "Broken Lines" was included as a "up and coming" track on the NOW 66 compilation album distributed in the United States by Universal music USA. The Knockturnal magazine said "the song finds cosmopolitan space somewhere between Florence Welch and Dua Lipa."

She's also had a Tamil song, "Hayati", featured in one of the biggest Tamil films in India Chekka Chivantha Vaanam's soundtrack produced by Oscar-winner AR Rahman which became a major hit in India.

She launched her first single "Call Me a Stranger" and music video of her full-length English solo debut, SIMPLE CURE to be released in June 2019.

She performed at the opening ceremony of Expo 2020, Dubai, UAE alongside Hussain Al Jassmi and Almas for the theme song "This Is Our Time".

== Discography ==
=== Singles ===
Incomplete list of songs featuring Mayssa Karaa
Year	Song title	Album	Role	Label
2013	"White Rabbit" (Arabic)	American Hustle	Vocals	Sony Classical
2017	"Comfortably Numb (Middle Eastern Version) (feat. Scott Page)	Comfortably Numb (Middle Eastern Version) feat. Scott Page	Vocals	(Eponymous Label)
2018	"Broken Lines"	NOW That's What I Call Music, Vol.66	Vocals and co-writer	Universal Music Group
2018	"Hayati"	Chekka Chivantha Vaanam	Vocals	Sony Music India
2018	"Call Me A Stranger"	Simple Cure	Vocals and co-writer	Soundrifft records
2025	"Abdi Abdi"	Genie	Vocals	Virgin Music Group

=== Soundtracks ===
Incomplete list of soundtracks featuring Mayssa Karaa
Year	Title	Role	Track(s)	Notes
2021	Axiom Verge 2	Vocals	"Silver Pipes"	Video game
2021	Axiom Verge 2	Vocals	"Procession of the Annunna"	Video game
2021	Axiom Verge 2	Vocals	"Monsoon"	Video game
2021	Axiom Verge 2	Vocals	"White Sand City"	Video game
