= Dino Natali =

American stage and television actor

- Born: Dino Domenico Natali
- Occupations: Stage and television actor
- Website: dinonatali.com

Dino Domenico Natali is an American stage and television actor. He is best known for playing the recurring role of the gay police officer, Officer Zitelli on five episodes on the American sitcom television series Barney Miller.

Natali co-starred with Pasquale Esposito, in the PBS documentary film Pasquale Esposito Celebrates Enrico Caruso in 2015. He has also guest-starred in television programs including, Get Smart, The Lucy Show, The Harvey Korman Show, Kojak, House Calls, Stir Crazy and Joe Bash. He made a small appearance in his first film debut in the 1979 film Love at First Bite, playing a man whose outside a castle. Before he began his screen career, he appeared in the stage play Hot Tin Roof in 1963.

== Filmography ==
=== Film ===
Year	Title	Role	Notes
1979	Love at First Bite	Man Outside Castle	

=== Television ===
Year	Title	Role	Notes
1966	Get Smart	KAOS Agent #1	1 episode
1966	The Lucy Show	Mel/Musician	2 episodes
1977	The Harvey Korman Show		1 episode
1978	Kojak	Moss	1 episode
1978-1981	Barney Miller	Officer Zatelli	5 episodes
1982	House Calls	Lenny	1 episode
1985	Stir Crazy	Milos	1 episode
1986	Joe Bash	Angelo	1 episode
