= Pasquale Esposito (tenor) =

Italian-born American tenor

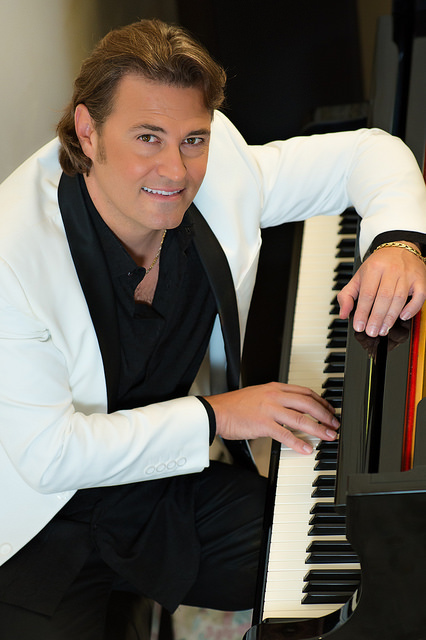

Background information
- Origin: Naples, Italy
- Genres: Operatic pop
- Occupation: Tenor
- Years active: 1998-present
- Label: Notable Records
- Website: www.pasqualeesposito.com

Pasquale Esposito is an Italian-born American tenor. He has released thirteen albums and has toured internationally.

== Early life and education ==
Esposito is originally from Naples, Italy. He has four sisters, and is the youngest out of the five siblings. At home, his family played the music of Enrico Caruso, who was also from Naples. He started singing when he was six and by age seven he was performing at church.

In 1998, he visited California and decided to move to America. His family was not supportive of his goal to relocate, after which he received a green card through an immigration lottery. After enrolling in ESL classes at Foothill College, Esposito started studying music at San Jose State University in San Jose, California. He graduated from the music program, with a degree in vocal performance, in 2009. While at San Jose State, he studied under Professor Joseph Frank.

== Musical career ==
=== Performances ===
Esposito is a lyric tenor, whose work focuses on operatic pop with occasional forays into traditional opera. Musically, Esposito is inspired by the work of Claudio Baglioni, Enrico Caruso, Pavarotti, and Giuseppe Di Stefano. He performs in multiple languages, including Italian, Neapolitan, Spanish, and English. Between 2005 and 2006, Esposito toured both Italy and the United States in support of his album Naples... That's Amore! In 2007 he then toured with Gigi D'Alessio and Anna Tatangelo on the US leg of their world tour. After this he toured his own show of original compositions called Simply Pasquale! In 2009 he performed Volare at a San Francisco Giants game. Between that year and 2010, he toured internationally in support of his album A Brand New Me. He has also performed for the San Francisco Opera, the Mission San Carlos Borromeo de Carmelo, the Fort Smith Symphony, the National Steinbeck Center, and the Folsom Symphony, for which he performed a Christmas program entitled Bianco Natale.

=== PBS Specials ===
In 2015 Esposito starred in Pasquale Esposito Celebrates Enrico Caruso for PBS. This was his first PBS special, described as a "docuconcert" in which Esposito paid tribute to the work of Enrico Caruso. The concert section of the special was filmed at the historic Castello Giusso in Vico Equense on the Amalfi Coast and the documentary portions were filmed in both Italy and the United States. The special also featured Dino Natali as co-host and an interview with opera singer Placido Domingo. The special premiered on March 10, 2015. Part of the documentary contains Esposito reflecting on his experience growing up in the same neighborhood that Caruso lived in while in Italy. A CD and DVD version of the docu-concert entitled Pasquale Esposito Celebrates Enrico Caruso was also released for sale through PBS and is available on line.

In the Spring of 2018, Pasquale Esposito released his 2nd Public Television Special, titled Pasquale Esposito Celebrates Italian Piazzas on PBS. For the special, Esposito visited — and performed at — the central squares of several Italian cities, including Rome, Venice, Palermo, Amalfi and his hometown, Naples. He also brought along one of his young music students, Victoria McDowell to perform alongside him. The live concert was filmed in the prestigious Piazza del Plebiscito in Naples, Italy on September 3, 2016. Special guests that evening included legendary actress and singer Lina Sastri and Grammy nominated Lebanese-American soprano Mayssa Karaa. Esposito was accompanied on stage by the Orchestra Talenti Napoletani conducted by Adriano Pennino.The non-profit organization Notable Music and Arts Organization financed the project.

Pasquale Esposito released his 3rd PBS Special: "IL TEMPO" in November 2020 nationally on PBS stations. The release of his 4th PBS Christmas Special: "In the Spirit of Christmas" was released in August 2021 and continues to air with Il Tempo on PBS stations nationally in the United States.

=== Opera Debut - San Francisco Opera ===
In 2015, Pasquale Esposito made his successful Opera debut with San Francisco Opera in the world premiere of Marco Tutino's Two Women. The opera was based on a 1958 Alberto Moravia novel that Vittorio De Sica turned into a film vehicle for Sophia Loren. Esposito performed the principal role of Ragazzo del Popolo. The first scene of "Two Women" benefits from evocative settings of three traditional Roman songs, and near the end, the tenor Pasquale Esposito sings the World War II-era pop hit "La Strada nel Bosco" with airy charm. During the peace celebration at the end, tenor Pasquale Esposito, a popular Italian crooner in real life, hopped atop a box, sang a song, and made effective his SFO debut.

== Albums ==
Esposito's album Naples... That's Amore! represented an Italian musical revue, which he had also directed and produced. His 2009 album A Brand New Me includes singing in both English and Italian, focusing on a pop music theme. Each of the tracks on the album were an original composition. His 2011 album Il Tempo was a double-CD that contains both Italian and Neapolitan standards and an original composition. In 2015, Esposito released the companion album from his PBS Special Pasquale Esposito Celebrates Enrico Caruso. In 2018, Esposito released the companion album from his 2nd PBS Special Pasquale Esposito Celebrates Italian Piazzas. Pasquale recorded and released his 9th album Pasquale Esposito Celebrates The Spirit of Christmas in November 2019. In November 2020, Pasquale released the Il Tempo 10th Anniversary Edition along with the debut of his 3rd PBS Television Special: Il Tempo. In April 2023, the Spanish version of Pasquale's album of original compositions A Brand New Me - Mi Nuevo Yo was released on digital platforms and for physical distribution. In November 2025, Esposito released his 2nd Christmas Compilation My Christmas by the Bay.

== Celebrating Sophia Loren ==
"Celebrating Sophia Loren" Concert Series

In November 2024, Italian-born American tenor Pasquale Esposito collaborated with conductor Carlo Ponti, the son of Sophia Loren, to create "Celebrating Sophia Loren," a concert tribute to the iconic Italian actress's cinematic career . The project was a natural extension for both artists; Esposito had previously made his San Francisco Opera debut in the world premiere of Two Women, an opera based on the same film that won Loren her Academy Award .

The debut performance took place on November 22, 2024, at The Broad Stage in Santa Monica, California. Esposito performed with the Los Angeles Virtuosi Orchestra, which was conducted by Maestro Carlo Ponti . The event was a celebration of Loren's 90th birthday, and the honoree was present in the audience for the sold-out show, accompanied by her son, film director Edoardo Ponti.

Following the success of the Los Angeles debut, the concert tour continued. On October 26, 2025, Esposito and Ponti presented the show at the Des Plaines Theatre in the greater Chicago, Illinois market, produced by Onesti Productions.

The European debut of the concert, titled "Celebrando Sophia Loren," was held on February 21 and 22, 2026, at the historic Teatro Augusteo in Naples, Italy . Both performances were sold out, drawing audiences from around the world . The Naples shows were a significant homecoming for the tribute, described as more than a concert but a musical fresco dedicated to Neapolitan and Italian culture. The production featured direction and choreography by Ettore Squillace and included special guests such as Neapolitan singer-songwriter Gigi Finizio, Lebanese-American soprano Mayssa Karaa, and acclaimed Italian actress and singer Lina Sastri . While Sophia Loren did not attend in person, she sent a video message thanking her son and Esposito for the tribute, and was connected live via streaming to witness the event. The program interwove classic Italian and Neapolitan songs, operatic arias, and original compositions by Esposito, all tied to Loren's life and filmography. The concert was noted for its emotional depth, with Carlo Ponti sharing personal anecdotes and Esposito paying tribute to recent losses in the Neapolitan artistic community.

=== Discography ===
- My Passion (2000)
- My Destiny (2004)
- Naples...That's Amore! (2005)
- Il Fornaio: Authentic Italy, Vol. 1 (2008)
- A Brand New Me (2009)
- Il Tempo (2011)
- Pasquale Esposito Celebrates Enrico Caruso (2015)
- Pasquale Esposito Celebrates Italian Piazzas (2018)
- In the Spirit of Christmas (2019)
- Il Tempo 10th Anniversary Edition (2020)
- In the Spirit of Christmas - Television Special Edition with Bonus Tracks (2021)
- Mi Nuevo Yo (2023)
- My Christmas by the Bay (2025)

== Personal life ==
He lives in San Jose, California and Naples, Italy. He is an American citizen and serves on the advisory board of directors for the Little Italy San Jose Foundation. When not performing, he teaches voice lessons from his recording studio. He also founded Notable Music and Arts Organization in 2012, a music education non-profit. He is married to Samira Ghazvini, an attorney, and has three children.
