= Shashwat Singh =

Indian singer

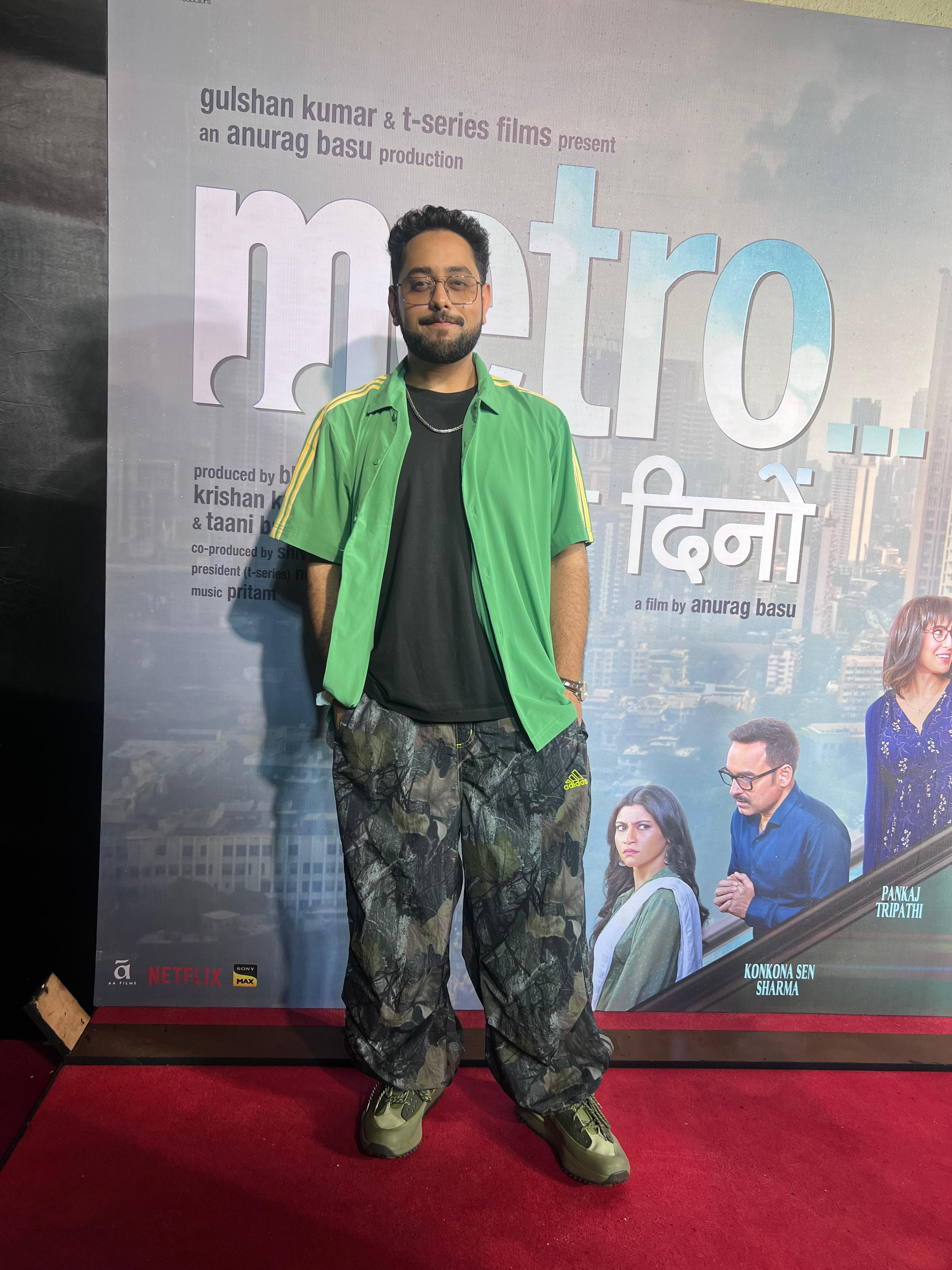
- Born: Allahabad (present-day Prayagraj), Uttar Pradesh, India
- Education: Allahabad University (BCom)
- Occupation: Playback singer
- Years active: 2015–present

Shashwat Singh is an Indian playback singer who primarily works in the Hindi film industry. Singh made his playback singing debut with the song "Wat Wat Wat" from the 2015 film Tamasha. Since his debut, Singh has collaborated with A. R. Rahman on several projects, including the 2025 film Thug Life, in which he sang the track "Sugar Baby".

== Early life ==
Shashwat Singh was born and raised in Allahabad (now Prayagraj), Uttar Pradesh, India. He grew up in a family of doctors and teachers who encouraged his passion for music from an early age. He studied at St. Joseph's College, Prayagraj, where he began learning the acoustic guitar. Later, he trained in Hindustani classical flute under the guidance of Sappan Prasanna. Singh holds a Bachelor of Commerce degree from Allahabad University. He considers his formal musical journey to have begun at A. R. Rahman’s KM Music Conservatory in Chennai, where he trained in Western classical music. During his time in Chennai, he also took Carnatic vocal lessons. Shashwat Singh's elder sister, Nidhi Singh, is an actress.

== Career ==
Singh has contributed vocals to several notable songs in Hindi cinema, including "Ruby Ruby" from Sanju, "Haan Main Galat" from Love Aaj Kal, "Sarsariya" from Mohenjo Daro, "Alizeh" from Ae Dil Hai Mushkil, "Show Me The Thumka" from Tu Jhoothi Main Makkaar, "Mere Sawaal Ka" from "Shehzada", and "Saregama Carvaan Medley" from Rocky Aur Rani Kii Prem Kahaani, among others.

In 2020, he performed five songs for the film "99 Songs".

Apart from Hindi, Singh has also recorded songs in other Indian languages, including Tamil,Telegu and Bengali. In addition to playback singing, he performs at live concerts and events with his band.

In 2025 Shashwat Singh collaborated with Nikhita Gandhi to form a musical duo under the name 'ShNik' . Their debut single, "Kaahe," blends elements of folk and hip-hop. That same year, Singh lent his voice to singles such as "Burai", "Talab", and "Jachhey Mujhe"; and 'Zamaana Lage' from the film Metro... In Dino.

== Discography ==
Year	Film	Song	Co-Singer(s)	Lyrics	Composer	Notes
2015	Tamasha	"Wat Wat Wat"	Arijit Singh	Irshad Kamil	A. R. Rahman	
2016	Mohenjo Daro	"Sarsariya"	Shashaa Tirupati	Javed Akhtar	A. R. Rahman	
2016	Ae Dil Hai Mushkil	"Alizeh"	Arijit Singh, Ash King	Amitabh Bhattacharya	Pritam	
2018	Sanju	"Ruby Ruby"	Poorvi Koutish	Irshad Kamil	A. R. Rahman	
2019	The Sky Is Pink	"Pink Gulabi Sky"	Jonita Gandhi	Gulzar	Pritam	
2020	Street Dancer 3D	"Mile Sur 2.0"	Navraj Hans, Shalmali Kholgade, Divya Kumar, Vayu, Shashwat Singh, IP Singh, Rakesh Maini	Jigar Saraiya, Vayu, IP Singh	Sachin-Jigar	
2020	Love Aaj Kal	"Haan Main Galat"	Arijit Singh	Irshad Kamil	Pritam	
2020	Bhangra Paa Le	"Peg Sheg"	Jonita Gandhi, Akasa Singh, A Bazz	JAM8, A Bazz		
2020	Bhangra Paa Le	"Ho Ja Rangeela Re"	Solo	Rishi Rich, Yash Narvekar, JAM8	Yash Narvekar, JAM8	
2021	99 Songs	"Teri Nazar"	Navneet Virk, Dilshaad Shabbir Shaikh	A. R. Rahman		
2021	99 Songs	"Nayi Nayi"	Raftaar	A. R. Rahman	Navneet Virk, Raftaar	
2021	99 Songs	"O Aashiqa"	A. R. Rahman	A. R. Rahman	Navneet Virk	
2021	99 Songs	"Sofia"	A. R. Rahman	A. R. Rahman	Navneet Virk	
2021	99 Songs	"Jwalamukhi (Female Version)"	Poorvi Koutish	A. R. Rahman	Navneet Virk	
2021	Meenakshi Sundareshwar	"Mann Kesar Kesar"	Aanandi Joshi, Goldie Sohel	Raj Shekhar	Justin Prabhakaran	Netflix film
2021	Tadap	"Tere Siva Jag Mein"	Darshan Raval, Shilpa Rao, Charan	Irshad Kamil, Charan	Pritam	
2022	Bhool Bhulaiyaa 2	"De Taali"	Armaan Malik, Yo Yo Honey Singh	Amitabh Bhattacharya, Yo Yo Honey Singh	Pritam	
2022	Brahmāstra: Part One – Shiva	"Kesariya (Dance Mix)"	Antara Mitra	Amitabh Bhattacharya	Pritam	
2022	Chup: Revenge of the Artist	"Gaya Gaya Gaya"	Rupali Moghe	Swanand Kirkire	Amit Trivedi	
2023	Shehzada	"Mere Sawal Ka"	Shalmali Kholgade	Shloke Lal	Pritam	
2023	Tu Jhoothi Main Makkaar	"Show Me The Thumka"	Sunidhi Chauhan	Amitabh Bhattacharya	Pritam	
2023	Rocky Aur Rani Kii Prem Kahaani	"Saregama Carvaan Medley"	Jonita Gandhi		Pritam	
2023	Rocky Aur Rani Kii Prem Kahaani	"Abhi Na Jao (Film Version 2)"	Solo		Pritam	
2024	Kahan Shuru Kahan Khatam	"Ek Ladki Bheegi Bhagi Si"	IP Singh, Kishore Kumar	IP Singh, Majrooh Sultanpuri	S. D. Burman, Akshay & IP	
2025	Metro... In Dino	"Zamana Laage"	Arijit Singh	Qaisar Ul Jafri, Sandeep Shrivastava	Pritam	Side A
2025	Metro... In Dino	"Zamana Laage (Rewind)"	Solo	Qaisar Ul Jafri, Sandeep Shrivastava	Pritam	Side B
2025	Metro... In Dino	"Ishq Ya Tharak"	Aditya Roy Kapur, Nikhita Gandhi, Antara Mitra	Amitabh Bhattacharya	Pritam	Side B
2025	Metro... In Dino	"Das Haasil Sau Baaki (Acapella)"	Papon, Nikhita Gandhi	Sandeep Srivastava	Pritam	Side B
2025	Thug Life	"Sugar Baby"	Nikhita Gandhi, Shuba	Shuba, Mehboob	A. R. Rahman	
2025	War 2	"Ulagena Uruveduthaay"	Nikhita Gandhi	Amitabh Bhattacharya	Pritam	Tamil dubbed
2025	War 2	"Oopiri Ooyalaga"	Nikhita Gandhi	Amitabh Bhattacharya	Pritam	Telugu dubbed
