= Nakul Abhyankar =

Indian playback singer

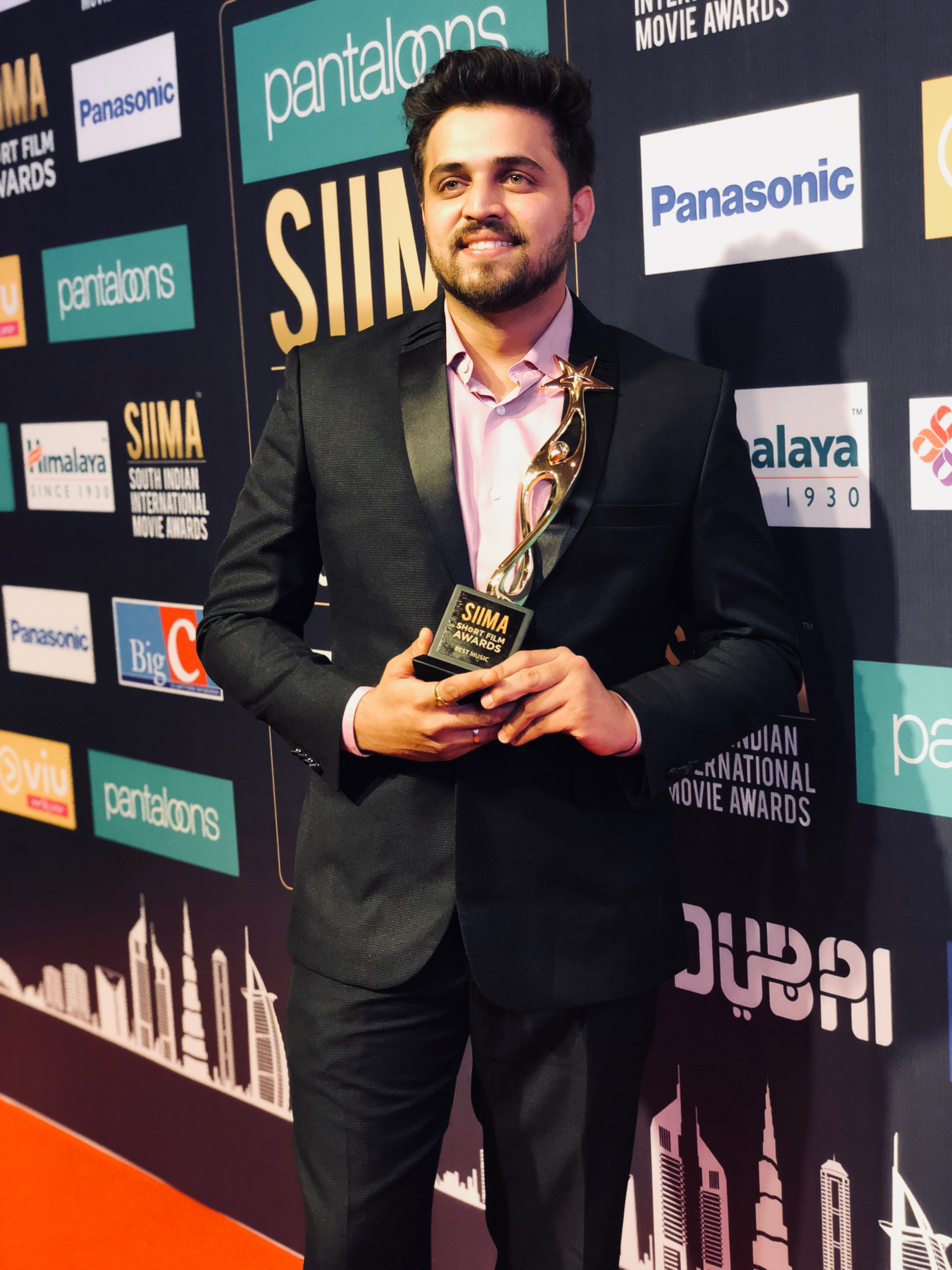
- Nakul at SIIMA awards, 2018

Background information
- Occupations: Singer; Composer

Nakul Abhyankar is an Indian playback singer, music composer and sound engineer. He has sung in Kannada, Tamil, Telugu, Malayalam and Tulu. He is best known for his songs "Love You Chinna" from the film Love Mocktail composed by Raghu Dixit, "Thumbi Thumbi" from the film Cobra composed by A. R. Rahman, "Neeli Kannumalo", a solo from the Telugu dubbed film Nawab, "CEO in the House" from the Tamil film Sarkar and Azhage from Tamil movie Action.

== Biography ==
He is trained in both the Hindustani and Carnatic styles of classical music. He received training in jazz singing at KM Music Conservatory and was a part of A.R. Rahman's jazz and music band, Nafs. He graduated from National Institute of Technology Karnataka with a degree in mechanical engineering in 2012. He is married to Ramya Bhat, who is also a singer.

== Discography ==
=== As a singer ===
| Year | Song title | Film/Soundtrack/Album | Composer | Language | Co-singer(s) | Notes |
|---|---|---|---|---|---|---|
| 2013 | "Usireega Marethanthe" | Chella Pilli | Mikku Kavil | Kannada | | |
| 2013 | "Yavatthu Hingagilla" | Rajanikantha | Arjun Janya | Kannada | | |
| 2013 | "Usiragu Baare" | Janma | Anoop Seelin | Kannada | | |
| 2014 | "Kadala Poyyeda" | Rang | Manikanth Kadri | Tulu | | |
| 2014 | "Gelathi Avatharisu" | Amanusha | Anil C.J. | Kannada | | |
| 2014 | "Preetige Rose Andaru" | Rose | Anoop Seelin | Kannada | | |
| 2015 | "Veelunte" | Krishnamma Kalipindi Iddarinia | Hari | Telugu | | |
| 2015 | "Alupule" | Keechaka | Josyabhatla Sharma | Telugu | | |
| 2015 | "Thelike Nalike" | Ice Cream | Madan Mohan | Tulu | | |
| 2015 | "Dayegu Kopadu" | Yeregla Panodchi | Giridhar Divan | Tulu | | |
| 2015 | "Yella Helohaagilla" | Yarige Idly | Giridhar Divan | Kannada | | |
| 2015 | "Time Illa" | Yarige Idly | Giridhar Divan | Kannada | | |
| 2015 | "Naavaadai" | Mosagaallaku Mosagaadu | Manikanth Kadri | Telugu | | |
| 2016 | "Hey Yaare Neenu" | Selfie | Arjun Ramu | Kannada | | |
| 2016 | "Koluse Sol Koluse" | Vallavanukkum Vallavan | Raghu Dixit | Tamil | | |
| 2016 | "Nenedidde Ondu" | Melkote Manja | Giridhar Divan | Kannada | | |
| 2017 | "Manase Manase" | Are Marler | Manikanth Kadri | Tulu | | |
| 2017 | "Kanatonji Kanane" | Ambar Caterers | Manikanth Kadri | Tulu | | |
| 2017 | "Sagariye" | Rishabhapriya | Charan Raj | Kannada | | Short Movie |
| 2017 | "The Party Anthem" | Happy New Year | Raghu Dixit | Kannada | | |
| 2017 | "Sa Re Ga Ma Pa Da Ni" | Happy New Year | Raghu Dixit | Kannada | | |
| 2017 | "Kaurava (Theme)" | Happy New Year | Raghu Dixit | Kannada | | |
| 2017 | "Bittakbeku Hudugiranna" | Kadhal | Praveen K B | Kannada | | |
| 2017 | "Eu Lifu" | Kadhal | Praveen K B | Kannada | | |
| 2017 | "Deshamokkate" | Sachin: A Billion Dreams | A. R. Rahman | Telugu | | Dubbed version |
| 2017 | "Studentu Lifealli" | A Happy Married Life | Anil C.J. | Kannada | | |
| 2017 | "Deepa Hacchu Vanithe" | Manasa | V. Manohar | Kannada | | |
| 2017 | "Navella Ondu" | Buckasura | Avinash Sreeram | Kannada | | |
| 2017 | "Buckasura" | Buckasura | Avinash Sreeram | Kannada | | |
| 2017 | "Aigiri Nandini Fusion" | Buckasura | Avinash Sreeram | Kannada | | |
| 2018 | "Petta Paraak" | Petta | Anirudh Ravichander | Hindi | | |
| 2018 | "Petta Paraak" | Petta | Anirudh Ravichander | Telugu | | |
| 2018 | "Hockey Anthem" | Men's Hockey World Cup 2018 | A.R. Rahman | Hindi | A.R. Rahman | |
| 2018 | "CEO in the House" | Sarkar | A.R. Rahman | Tamil | | |
| 2018 | "Kelambitale Vijayalakshmi" | Kaatrin Mozhi | A.H.Kaashif | Tamil | | |
| 2018 | "Neeli Kanumallo" | Nawab | A. R. Rahman | Telugu | | Telugu dubbed for Chekka Chivantha Vaanam |
| 2018 | "Segalu Chimmuthondhi" | Nawab | A. R. Rahman | Telugu | Sunitha Sarathy, Sathya Prakash | Telugu dubbed for Chekka Chivantha Vaanam |
| 2018 | "College Days" | Rajaratha | Anup Bhandari | Kannada | | |
| 2018 | "College Days" | Rajaratham | Anup Bhandari | Telugu | | |
| 2018 | "Koode" | Koode | Raghu Dixit | Malayalam | | |
| 2018 | "Hasirina Koogu" | Kattu Kathe | Vikram Subramanya | Kannada | | |
| 2018 | "Nanamathu" | Jagath Kiladi | Giridhar Divan | Kannada | | |
| 2018 | "Kollegala Dinda" | Jagath Kiladi | Giridhar Divan | Kannada | | |
| 2018 | "Nalmeya Premika" | Jagath Kiladi | Giridhar Divan | Kannada | | |
| 2018 | "Jagath Kiladi" | Jagath Kiladi | Giridhar Divan | Kannada | | |
| 2018 | "Nakshatra" | Rangbirangi | Manikanth Kadri | Kannada | | |
| 2018 | "Paravasha Ayethua" | Sedu | L.N.Shastri | Tamil | | |
| 2019 | "Azhage" | Action | Hiphop Tamizha | Tamil | | |
| 2020 | Saavira Pranaama | Single | Nakul Abhyankar | Kannada | | |
| 2020 | Mudhal Nee Mudivum Nee | Kaatrilae | Darbuka Siva | Tamil | | |
| 2020 | Thayi Hakki | Bicchugatthi | Nakul Abhyankar | Kannada | | Additional Vocals : Ramya Bhat |
| 2020 | Durgada Hebbuli | Bicchugatthi | Nakul Abhyankar | Kannada | | |
| 2020 | Love You Chinna | Love Mocktail | Raghu Dixit | Kannada | Shruthi VS | |
| 2020 | Janumagale Kaayuve | Love Mocktail | Raghu Dixit | Kannada | | |
| 2020 | Ay Pilla | Love Story | Pawan Ch | Telugu | Haricharan and Hiral Viradia | |
| 2021 | Praanam | Orey Baammardhi | G.V. Prakash Kumar | Telugu | | |
| 2021 | Thappennadi Thappu | Ek Love Ya | Arjun Janya | Tamil | | |
| 2021 | Choosa Maaye Ilaa | 99 Songs | A. R. Rahman | Telugu | Shashaa Tirupati | |
| 2021 | Evo Evo Kalale | Love Story | Pawan Ch | Telugu | Jonita Gandhi | |
| 2021 | Ninadene Januma | Love Mocktail 2 | Nakul Abhyankar | Kannada | | |
| 2021 | Dhakka Laga Bukka (Youth Anthem) | Tandav | A.R. Rahman | Hindi | A.R. Rahman | Additional Vocals : Shenbagaraj G, Santosh Hariharan, Vignesh Narayanan, Lavita Lobo, Deepthi Suresh, Rakshita Suresh, Hiral Viradia Additional Vocal Textures – Arjun Chandy |
| 2022 | Chola Chola Saaya Sanjale | Ponniyin Selvan: I | A.R. Rahman | Tamil | Sathyaprakash, VM Mahalingam | |
| 2022 | Viral | Solamante Theneechakal | Vidyasagar | Malayalam | | |
| 2022 | Thumbi Thumbi | Cobra | A. R. Rahman | Tamil | Shreya Ghoshal | |
| 2023 | Merise Mabbullo | Anni Manchi Sakunamule | Mickey J. Meyer | Telugu | Ramya Bhat Abhyankar | |
| 2023 | Payanisive Manasugalu | Hondisi Bareyiri | Joe Costa | Kannada | | |
| 2024 | "Suro Suro" | Ayalaan | A. R. Rahman | Tamil | Mohit Chauhan | |
| 2024 | Uyirey | Amaran (2024 film) | G. V. Prakash Kumar | Tamil | Ramya Bhat Abhyankar | |
| 2024 | "Yolo" | Kanguva | Devi Sri Prasad | Kannada | Ranina Reddy | Dubbed version |
| 2025 | Aazaadi | Thandel | Devi Sri Prasad | Telugu | | |
| 2026 | Neene Neenene Nannella Aase | Love Mocktail 3 | Nakul Abhyankar | Kannada | | |
| 2026 | Manemma | Irumudi | G. V. Prakash Kumar | Telugu | | Dubbed version |
| 2026 | Mithwa | ENE Repeat | Vivek Sagar | Telugu | Bharadwaj Gali | |

=== As a composer ===
| Year | Film/TV Series | Language | Notes |
|---|---|---|---|
| 2018 | Rishabhapriya | Kannada | Short Movie, Best Music Director Winner at SIIMA Awards with Co-Composer : Charan Raj |
| 2019 | Kannad Gothilla | Kannada | Rearranged: Jaya Bharata Jananiya Tanujate |
| 2019 | Unarvu | Tamil | |
| 2020 | Bicchugatthi | Kannada | |
| 2021 | Ganga | Hindi | Series for Ishara TV, track sung by Kailash Kher |
| 2021 | Rudramma | Telugu | Series for Star Maa, track sung by M.M.Manasi |
| 2022 | One Cut Two Cut | Kannada | |
| 2022 | Humble Politiciann Nograj | Kannada | web series |
| 2022 | Love Mocktail 2 | Kannada | |
| 2025 | Flirt | Kannada | Score only |
| 2026 | Love Mocktail 3 | Kannada | |
| 2026 | America America 2 | Kannada | Score only |
