= Poorvi Koutish =

Indian professional singer (born 1995)

- Occupations: Singer-songwriter; actress; music producer
- Years active: 2012–present
- Musical career
- Genres: pop; experimental pop; bollywood; electronic; world music; jazz

Poorvi Koutish (/ˈpʊərvi ˈkɒtɪʃ/ POOR-vee KOT-ish; is an Indian singer, song-writer, actress, and music producer. She was one of the top four final contestants in India's biggest musical reality show, Indian Idol 6.

== Television ==
- Indian Idol 6 as Contestant

== Discography ==
List of (film/non-film) songs recorded by Poorvi Koutish.

Year	Song title	Film/Album	Composer	Lyricist	Notes
2012	"Pal - Jazz Mix"	Pal - Indian Idol Winner's Song			
2014	"Tauba Main Vyaah Karke Pachhtaya"	Shaadi Ke Side Effects	Pritam		with Shahid Mallya and Alamgir Khan
2017	"Police Wala Don"	Aa Gaya Hero			with Ahan
2017	"Veriyera"	Vivegam	Anirudh Ravichander		with Anirudh Ravichander and M. M. Manasi
2018	"Ruby Ruby"	Sanju	A.R. Rahman		with Shashwat Singh
2018	"Jaana Kahan"	Single	Dhrubo	Tripurari	
2019	"Kahaniyan Khayaalon Ki"	Single	Poorvi Koutish		
2020	"Jwalamukhi (Female Version)"	99 Songs	A.R. Rahman		with Shashwat Singh
2020	"The Voice Without Words"	99 Songs	A.R. Rahman		
2020	"Mera Naam Kizzie"	Dil Bechara	A.R. Rahman		with Aditya Narayan
2021	"Netrikann (Title track)"	Netrikann	Girishh G		

== Filmography ==
=== Films ===
Year	Title	Role	Notes
2023	Ho Ja Mukt	Sherry Khambatta	
