= Love Aaj Kal (2020 soundtrack) =

Soundtrack album by Pritam
- Released: 14 February 2020
- Recorded: 2019–2020
- Genre: Feature film soundtrack
- Length: 49:55
- Language: Hindi
- Label: Sony Music India

Pritam chronology
| The Sky Is Pink (2019) | Love Aaj Kal (2020) | Ludo (2020) |

Love Aaj Kal is the soundtrack album to the 2020 film of the same name directed by Imtiaz Ali which is a spiritual successor of his own 2009 film, and starred Kartik Aaryan and Sara Ali Khan in the lead roles. The film's soundtrack is composed by Pritam and lyrics written by Irshad Kamil, both of them worked on the predecessor as well. The album was released under the Sony Music India label on 14 February 2020.

== Release ==
The album was preceded by the first single, "Shayad" which released on 22 January 2020. The song was performed by Arijit Singh; Pritam considered the song as "an ode to young love" and through this, he wanted to create a soundtrack "that imbibes its timelessness" like the predecessor's soundtrack.

The second song "Haan Mat Galat" was released on 29 January 2020. The song was rendered by Arijit and Shashwat Singh. On making the song, Pritam noted that they wanted a "light and exciting" song that stayed with the audience as well as capturing the essence of the film. He considered the song to be the point of view of youngsters in the current generation and their reaction to the pre-conditioning enforced them by the society and how they reached the tipping point where the refuse to shape and reshape themselves as per the society and instead choose to carry on with the acceptance of "right and wrong".

The third song "Mehrama" was released on 7 February 2020. It is an emotional duet number sung by Darshan Raval and Antara Mitra.

The complete soundtrack featuring 13 songs was released through Sony Music India on 14 February 2020, the same day as the film.

== Reception ==
Vipin Nair of The Hindu stated that while the original 2009 film's soundtrack had been the composer-lyricist's best works, he rated this soundtrack higher owing to the quality of the songs and lesser Punjabi influences. Debarati S Sen of The Times of India noted that Pritam lives upto the standards he set with the 2009 film's soundtrack, for the spiritual sequel. Joginder Tuteja of Bollywood Hungama wrote "The music of Love Aaj Kal has consistency written all over it, barring a couple of songs which are misfits." Sukanya Verma of Rediff.com called it a "catchy soundtrack".

== Track listing ==
| No. | Title | Singer(s) | Length |
|---|---|---|---|
| 1. | "Shayad" | Arijit Singh | 4:07 |
| 2. | "Haan Main Galat" | Arijit Singh, Shashwat Singh | 3:38 |
| 3. | "Mehrama" | Darshan Raval, Antara Mitra | 4:09 |
| 4. | "Rahogi Meri" | Arijit Singh | 4:13 |
| 5. | "Aur Tanha" | KK | 4:56 |
| 6. | "Yeh Dooriyan" | Mohit Chauhan | 4:02 |
| 7. | "Shayad" (Reprise) | Arijit Singh, Madhubanti Bagchi | 4:06 |
| 8. | "Parmeshwara" | Raftaar | 3:07 |
| 9. | "Dhak Dhak" | Nikhita Gandhi, Akasa Singh | 3:29 |
| 10. | "Haan Tum Ho" | Arijit Singh, Shilpa Rao | 4:51 |
| 11. | "Mehrama" (Extended) | Darshan Raval, Antara Mitra | 5:37 |
| 12. | "Shayad" (Aaj Kal) | Arijit Singh | 3:40 |
| 13. | "Shayad" (Film Version) | Jubin Nautiyal, Madhubanti Bagchi | 4:05 |
| Total length: | | | 54:00 |

== Accolades ==
| Award (Note: Awards, festivals and organizations are in alphabetical order.) | Date of ceremony (Note: Date is linked to the article about the awards held that year, wherever possible.) | Category | Nominee(s) | Result | Ref. |
|---|---|---|---|---|---|
| Filmfare Awards | 28 March 2021 | Best Music Director | Pritam | Nominated | |
| Filmfare Awards | 28 March 2021 | Best Lyricist | Irshad Kamil – ("Mehrama") | Nominated | |
| Filmfare Awards | 28 March 2021 | Best Lyricist | Irshad Kamil – ("Shayad") | Nominated | |
| Filmfare Awards | 28 March 2021 | Best Male Playback Singer | Arijit Singh – ("Shayad") | Nominated | |
| Filmfare Awards | 28 March 2021 | Best Male Playback Singer | Darshan Raval – ("Mehrama") | Nominated | |
| Filmfare Awards | 28 March 2021 | Best Female Playback Singer | Antara Mitra – ("Mehrama") | Nominated | |
| International Indian Film Academy Awards | 3–4 June 2022 | Best Lyricist | Irshad Kamil – ("Shayad") | Nominated | |
| Mirchi Music Awards | 19 March 2022 | Album of The Year | Love Aaj Kal | Nominated | |
| Mirchi Music Awards | 19 March 2022 | Listeners' Choice Album of the Year | Love Aaj Kal | Nominated | |
| Mirchi Music Awards | 19 March 2022 | Best Song Producer(s) – Programming & Arranging | Arijit Singh, Somanshu Agarwal, Sunny M. R. and Zafar Iqbal Ansari – ("Shayad") | Nominated | |

== Personnel credits ==
Credits adapted from Sony Music India:

- Music – Pritam
- Lyrics – Irshad Kamil
- Music Production – DJ Phukan, Sunny M. R., Arijit Singh, Sourav Roy, Aditya N., Saurabh Lokhande, Utkarsh Dhotekar
- Vocal Production – Akashdeep Sengupta, Tushar Joshi, Arijit Singh, Antara Mitra
- Music Arrangements – Sunny M. R., Arijit Singh, Sourav Roy, Aditya N., Tushar Joshi, Saurabh Lokhande, Utkarsh Dhotekar
- Music Programming – Somanshu Agarwal, Zafar Iqbal Ansari, Arijit Singh, Johan Polke
- Sound Design – DJ Phukan, Sunny M. R., Ashwin Kulkarni, Aditya N., Tanuj Tiku, Akashdeep Sengupta, Aniruddh Anantha
- Vocal Conductor – Aniruddh Anantha
- Music Production Manager – Anurag Sharma
- Chief Sound Engineer and Shoot-Mix – Ashwin Kulkarni
- Sound Engineers – Aniruddh Anantha, Harjot Kaur, Aaroh Velankar
- Recording Engineer – Ritvik Shah
- Songs Premixes – Sunny M.r. & Ashwin Kulkarni
- Mixing and Mastering – Eric Pillai (Future Sound Of Bombay), Shadab Rayeen (New Edge Studios)
- Technical Assistance – Anirban Sinha Chowdhury, Michael Edwin Pillai, Abhishek Sortey, Dhananjay Khapekar, Tapas Sahoo

Musicians

- Backing Vocals – Akashdeep Sengupta, Shashwat Singh, Nihal Shetty, Harjot Kaur, Ashwin Kulkarni, Aniruddh Anantha, Aman Agarwal, Vivienne Pocha, Shazneen Arethna, Marianne D'Cruz Aiman, Chandana Bala Kalyan, N'Faly Kouyate, Ibrahim Sidede, Lydia Ogoti, Hannah Wangari
- Additional Vocals – Akashdeep Sengupta
- Chorus – Akashdeep Sengupta, Aniruddh Anantha, Anurag Sharma, Ana Rehman, Harjot Kaur, Shreya Phukan, Mandy Gill, Mukund Shrikant Suryawanshi
- Vocal Design – DJ Phukan
- Harmony Design – Akashdeep Sengupta, Aniruddh Anantha, Aditya N.
- Acoustic Guitars – Arijit Singh, Tushar Joshi
- Electric Guitars – Aditya Shankar Benia, Prachotosh Bhowmik, Roland Fernandes
- Guitars – Pawan Rasaily, Aditya N., Sudhir Choudhary, Roland Fernandes, Raghav Chaitanya, Josh Smit
- Bass – RajKumar Dewan, Among Jamir, Roland Fernandes, Sunny M. R., Ernest Tibbs
- Drums – Alan Hertz
- Woodwinds – Nirmalya Humtoo Dey
- Flute, Viola and Violin – Shirish Malhotra
- Strings – Tapas Roy
- Percussion – Gary Novak, Alan Hertz
- Tabla – Sukanto Singha, Ishteyak Khan
- Sarangi – Dilshad Khan
- Saxophone – I D Rao
- Ukulele – Ashwin Kulkarni
- Kora – N'Faly Kouyate
- Thumb Piano – Anand Bhagat, Rapasa nyatrapasa Otieno
- African Harp – Nyatiti
- Live Dubs – Zafar Iqbal Ansari, Tushar Joshi, Kaushik Das, DJ Phukan, Sunny M.R., Shubham Shirule
- Live Rhythms and Percussions – Vibhas 'Titu' Rahul, Anand Bhagat
- Live Xylophone – Anand Bhagat

== See also ==
- Love Aaj Kal
