= 14th Mirchi Music Awards =

2022 Hindi language movie-music award ceremony

14th Smule Mirchi Music Awards
- Sponsored by: Smule (Title); Malabar Gold and Diamonds (Presenting)
- Date: 19 March 2022
- Location: Yash Raj Studio, Mumbai
- Country: India
- Presented by: Radio Mirchi
- Hosted by: Sonu Nigam; Neha Bhasin; Meiyang Chang

Highlights
- Most awards: Shershaah
- Male Vocalist of the Year: Javed Ali for "Srivalli"
- Female Vocalist of the Year: Shreya Ghoshal for "Chaka Chak"
- Website: Music Mirchi Awards 2021

Television/radio coverage
- Network: Colors TV

The 14th Smule Mirchi Music Awards or Mirchi Music Awards 2022 or MMA 14 is the 14th edition of the Mirchi Music Awards, held on 19 March 2022 at Yash Raj Studios to honour the best Indian music of 2020 and 2021, and broadcast on 27 March 2022 on Colors TV and digitally on JioTV, JioCinema and Voot.

== Awards ==
The winners and nominees are listed below. Winners are listed first, highlighted in boldface, and indicated with a double dagger (‡).

=== Main awards ===
Album of The Year	Song of The Year
**Shershaah**‡; Atrangi Re; Dil Bechara; Love Aaj Kal; Malang	**"Raataan Lambiyan" – Shershaah**‡; "Aabaad Barbaad" – Ludo; "Chaka Chak" – Atrangi Re; "Mann Bharryaa 2.0" – Shershaah; "Ranjha" – Shershaah
Music Composer of The Year	Lyricist of The Year
**Tanishk Bagchi – "Raataan Lambiyan" – Shershaah**‡; A. R. Rahman – "Chaka Chak" – Atrangi Re; A. R. Rahman – "Rait Zara Si" – Atrangi Re; A. R. Rahman – "Tere Rang" – Atrangi Re; Jasleen Royal – "Ranjha" – Shershaah	**Tanishk Bagchi – "Raataan Lambiyan" – Shershaah**‡; Anvita Dutt – "Ranjha" – Shershaah; Gulzar – "Chhapaak (Title Track)" – Chhapaak; Irshad Kamil – "Chaka Chak" – Atrangi Re; Jaani – "Mann Bharryaa 2.0" – Shershaah
Male Vocalist of The Year	Female Vocalist of The Year
**Javed Ali – "Srivalli" – Pushpa: The Rise**‡; Arijit Singh – "Aabaad Barbaad" – Ludo; Arijit Singh – "Tumhein Mohabbat Hai" – Atrangi Re; Haricharan – "Tere Rang" – Atrangi Re; Jubin Nautiyal – "Raataan Lambiyan" – Shershaah	**Shreya Ghoshal – "Chaka Chak" – Atrangi Re**‡; Asees Kaur – "Raatan Lambiyan" – Shershaah; Shreya Ghoshal – "Tere Rang" – Atrangi Re; Shreya Ghoshal – "Param Sundari" – Mimi; Sunidhi Chauhan – "Saami Saami" – Pushpa: The Rise

=== Upcoming Awards ===
Upcoming Music Composer of The Year	Upcoming Lyricist of The Year
**Arijit Singh – "Thode Kam Ajnabi" – Pagglait**‡; Arijit Singh – "Pagglait (Title Track)" – Pagglait; Arijit Singh – "Pagal" – Pagglait; Gaurav Chatterji – "Phoonk Phoonk" – Ginny Weds Sunny; Gurnazar Chattha – "Marjaawaan" – Bell Bottom	**Peer Zahoor – "Rubaru" – Ginny Weds Sunny**‡; Anil Verma – "Shankara Re Shankara" – Tanhaji; Dinesh Pant – "Do Din Ka Ye Mela" – Gulabo Sitabo; Rohit Sharma – "Kol Kol" – Taish; Vinod Dubey – "Kya Leke Aayo Jagme" – Gulabo Sitabo
Upcoming Male Vocalist of The Year	Upcoming Female Vocalist of The Year
**Ved Sharma – "Malang (Title Track)" – Malang**‡; Akashdeep Sengupta – "Hoye Ishq Na" – Tadap; Gurinder Seagal – "Pind" – Street Dancer 3D; Gurnazar Chattha – "Marjaawaan" – Bell Bottom; Pranaay Rijia – "Get Ready To Fight (Reloaded)" – Baaghi 3	**Sharvi Yadav – "Maari Chhalangein" – Skater Girl**‡; Amrita Singh – "Shine On Me (Remix)" – Skater Girl; Khatija Rahman – "Rock A Bye Baby" – Mimi; Rakshita Suresh – "Yaane Yaane" – Mimi; Saindhavi Prakash – "Nain Bandhe Naino Se" – Thalaivii

=== Listeners' Choice Awards ===
Listeners' Choice Album of The Year	Listeners' Choice Song of The Year
**Atrangi Re**‡; Dil Bechara; Love Aaj Kal; Malang; Shershaah	**"Chaka Chak" – Atrangi Re**‡; "Aabaad Barbaad" – Ludo; "Mann Bharryaa 2.0" – Shershaah; "Raataan Lambiyan" – Shershaah; "Ranjha" – Shershaah
Listeners' Choice Independent Music Category (Indies) Song of The Year
**"Lut Gaye" – Jubin Nautiyal – Tanishk Bagchi**‡ (Re-Created); "Bachpan Ka Pyaar" – Sahdev Dirdo, Badshah, Aastha Gill – Kamalesh Barot; "Filhaal2 Mohabbat" – Ammy Virk, B Praak, Jaani – Jaani; "Jalebi Baby" – Tesher, Jason Derulo – Tesher; "Paani Paani" – Badshah, Aastha Gill – Badshah

=== Technical Awards ===
Best Background Score	Best Song Producer(s) – Programming & Arranging
**Sandeep Shirodkar – Tanhaji**‡; Amar Mohile – Sooryavanshi; Daniel B. George – Bell Bottom; John Stewart Eduri – Gunjan Saxena: The Kargil Girl; Julius Packiam – 83	**A. R. Rahman – "Param Sundari" – Mimi**‡; Arijit Singh, Somanshu Agarwal, Sunny MR & Zafar Iqbal Ansari – "Shayad" – Love Aaj Kal; DJ Phukan & Akull – "Malang (Title Track)" – Malang; DJ Phukan, Sourav Roy & Sunny MR – "Aabaad Barbaad" – Ludo; Tanishk Bagchi – "Raataan Lambiyan" – Shershaah
Best Song Engineer(s) – Recording & Mixing
**Aaroh Velankar, Aniruddh Anantha, Ashwin Kulkarni, Harjot Kaur & Shadab Rayeen – "Aabaad Barbaad" – Ludo**‡; Abhijit Shesh, Akash Mukherjee, Ashwin Kulkarni, Aaroh Velankar, Aniruddh Anantha, Harjot Kaur, Pranav Gupta, Subhashree Da & Eric Pillai – "Tumse Bhi Zyada" – Tadap; Abhishek Khandelwal & Tosief Shaikh – "Burj Khalifa" – Laxmii; Nakul Abhyankar & Suresh Permal – "Param Sundari" – Mimi; Pramod Chandorkar & Vijay Dayal – "Maay Bhavani" – Tanhaji

== Special Jury Awards ==
Lifetime Achievement Award
- Suman Kalyanpur
Goldern Era Album of The Year – 1961
- Hum Dono
Outstanding Contribution
- U.K. Dubey
Royal Stag Live It Large
- Taapsee Pannu
Mirchi Trendsetter of The Year
- Yohani – "Manike Mage Hithe"
Face of Bollywood Hits
- Karisma Kapoor

== Jury ==
Source – Mirchi Music Awards

=== Screening Jury ===
- 1. Shruti Pathak
- 2. Abhishek Ray
- 3. Anand Sharma
- 4. Akbar Sami
- 5. Bishwadeep Chatterjee
- 6. Dominique
- 7. Nandini
- 8. Kavita Seth
- 9. Shibani Kashyap
- 10. Priya Sarayia
- 11. Hamsika Iyer
- 12. Aaman Trikha
- 13. Manoj Muntashir
- 14. Mayur Puri
- 15. Bipin Aneja
- 16. Brayan
- 17. Shadab Faridi
- 18. Brijesh Sandiliyar
- 19. Antara Mitra
- 20. Jeetu Shankar
- 21. Bhoomi Trivedi
- 22. Paroma Das Gupta
- 23. Divya Kumar

=== Grand Jury ===
- 1. Kavita Krishnamurthy
- 2. Ila Arun
- 3. Vidya Shah
- 4. Ramesh Sippy
- 5. Sudhir Mishra
- 6. Dharmesh Darshan
- 7. Ahmed Khan
- 8. Suresh Wadkar
- 9. Sharvan Rathod (of Nadeem-Shravan)
- 10. Millind Srivastava (of Anand–Milind)
- 11. Pritam
- 12. Louiz Banks
- 13. Lalit Pandit
- 14. Raju Singh
- 15. Sameer Anjaan (lyricist)
- 16. Irshad Kamil
- 17. Talat Aziz
- 18. Roop Kumar Rathod
- 19. Udit Narayan
- 20. Pandit Sujit Ojha
- 21. Vijay Dayal
- 22. Himesh Reshammiya

== Superlatives ==
Multiple nominations
Nominations	Film
16	Shershaah
12	Atrangi Re
5	Ludo
5	Mimi
4	Malang
3	Bell Bottom
3	Love Aaj Kal
3	Pagglait
3	Tanhaji
2	Dil Bechara
2	Ginny Weds Sunny
2	Gulabo Sitabo
2	Pushpa: The Rise
2	Skater Girl
2	Tadap

Multiple wins
Awards	Film
4	Shershaah
3	Atrangi Re
