= Shershaah (soundtrack) =

2021 soundtrack album

Soundtrack album by Tanishk Bagchi, B Praak, Jasleen Royal, Javed–Mohsin and Vikram Montrose
- Released: 16 August 2021
- Recorded: 2019–2021
- Genre: Film soundtrack
- Length: 22:03
- Languages: Hindi, Punjabi
- Label: Sony Music India
- Producers: Azeem Dayani (supervisor); Tanishk Bagchi, Ganesh Waghela (for Raataan Lambiyan - Chill Mix); Dj Lijo (for Shershaah Mashup)

Shershaah is the soundtrack album to the 2021 Hindi film of the same name directed by Vishnuvardhan. Based on the life of Param Vir Chakra-awardee Captain Vikram Batra, the film stars Sidharth Malhotra and Kiara Advani in leading roles. The film score is composed by John Stewart Eduri. The original songs featured in the film were composed by Tanishk Bagchi, B Praak, Jasleen Royal, Javed–Mohsin and Vikram Montrose with lyrics written by Manoj Muntashir, Rashmi Virag, Anvita Dutt, Jaani and Bagchi. The soundtrack album released by Sony Music India on 16 August 2021.

The album received positive response from audiences, with the tracks "Raataan Lambiyan" and "Ranjha" which earlier released as singles, topped the national and global charts, in all music and video platforms. The track "Raataan Lambiyan" is the most streamed Bollywood song on Spotify with over 500 million audio streams. It emerged as one of the biggest soundtracks of 2021, and the fastest Indian album to cross one billion audio streams worldwide.

== Overview ==
The soundtrack remains the only work that does not feature the collaboration between Vishnuvardhan and Yuvan Shankar Raja, who had been his norm composer in all his previous films. The film featured three original tracks, which is pictured on the romantic relationship between Vikram Batra (Malhotra) and Dimple Cheema (Advani). The soundtrack album had six songs, with the three tunes and an alternate version of the track. Azeem Dayani was the music supervisor. All the songs were recorded during mid-2018. Jubin Nautiyal recorded the first track from the album "Raataan Lambiyan", with the co-singer Asees Kaur, which was written and sung by Tanishk Bagchi. Speaking about his experience on recording the track, he stated in an interview with India Today, saying "When I heard the mix close to the release, I was happy and overwhelmed because the sound was very different as I heard it after a long time. We did a lot of different songs and suddenly a different sound was coming. I knew the song is going to go places. I told the makers it was very risky to release films that year and music and all, but somehow, I was confident about that song. I knew it would work and it did, big time." A fan made Bhojpuri version of the track was released during October 2021.

"Ranjha", a song composed by Jasleen Royal, who sung the track along with B Praak and written by Anvita Dutt, was originally envisioned for Badhaai Ho (2018), but the producers rejected the track since it could not sync with the situation of the film. This track was later featured in this film, following Dayani's insistence and had changed the lyrics as per the film’s situation. "Jai Hind Ki Senaa" is composed by Vikram Montrose, who also sung the track and was written by Manoj Muntashir. Though the track was not featured in the film, it was later released as a promotional single, during the Independence Day week on 11 August 2021, a day of the film's release on Amazon Prime Video. News18 stated that: "Jai Hind Ki Senaa aptly captures the spirit of India’s freedom fighters, who dedicate their lives for the country and are willing to go to any extent to protect the nation". The track "Mann Bharryaa", composed and sung by B Praak with lyrics written by Jaani which was released in 2017, was recreated by the singer-composer himself. The recreated version of the track was titled "Mann Bharryaa 2.0" and was released as a bonus track on 15 August. The track was played during the climax of the film, where Cheema mourns Batra's death and reminisces her moments with Batra.

== Track listing ==
Shershaah (Original Motion Picture Soundtrack)
No.	Title	Lyrics	Music	Singer(s)	Length
1.	"Raataan Lambiyan"	Tanishk Bagchi	Tanishk Bagchi	Jubin Nautiyal, Asees Kaur	3:50
2.	"Ranjha"	Anvita Dutt	Jasleen Royal	B Praak, Jasleen Royal, Romy	3:48
3.	"Kabhii Tumhhe" (Male Version)	Rashmi Virag	Javed–Mohsin	Darshan Raval	3:50
4.	"Jai Hind Ki Senaa"	Manoj Muntashir	Vikram Montrose	Vikram Montrose	2:31
5.	"Kabhii Tumhhe" (Female Version)	Rashmi Virag	Javed–Mohsin	Palak Muchhal	3:38
6.	"Mann Bharryaa 2.0"	Jaani	B Praak	B Praak	4:26
Total length:					22:03

Deluxe Edition
No.	Title	Lyrics	Music	Singer(s)	Length
7.	"Raataan Lambiyan - Lofi Flip"	Tanishk Bagchi	Tanishk Bagchi	Jubin Nautiyal, Asses Kaur	3:50
8.	"Ranjha - Sid X Kiara Wedding Version"	Anvita Dutt, Shraddha Sehgal	Jasleen Royal	Prerna Arora, Ashwani Basoya	1:57
9.	"Ranjha - Lofi Flip"	Anvita Dutt	Jasleen Royal	B Praak, Jasleen Royal	3:22
10.	"Ranjha - Reprise"	Anvita Dutt	Jasleen Royal	B Praak, Jasleen Royal, Romy	3:44
11.	"Kabhii Tumhhe - Lofi Flip"	Rashmi Virag	Javed - Mohsin	Darshan Raval	3:37
Total length:					38:33

== Reception ==
Critic based at Bollywood Hungama praised the composition and song placement, as the "songs celebrate the true essence of the movie in a perfect manner". BizAsia gave 4 out of 5 stars saying that "soundtrack is definitely much better than expectations". It further wrote "Karan Johar and Vishnuvardhan have done well picking each song that is just beautiful to listen to while adding a whole lot of value to the movie. Each song fits with the story and setting of the film and thus feels perfectly adequate in itself. The brilliant part is that each of the six songs are background songs and not performed in to the camera giving further authenticity to the character of Capt. Vikram Batra and thus the movie. There is great amount of romantic songs in the album with one patriotic song which is the only negative here as there is less variety and by the end of the album one can’t help but feel a little blue, although that fits well for the movie but not as an album. Nonetheless, each song is brilliant on this soundtrack." Shreya Paul of Firstpost stated that "the album has no skippable tracks and is a no-miss endeavour". Suanshu Khurana of The Indian Express listed on "Mann Bharryaa 2.0" opining that the track "stood out as a musical beauty in the film".

== Chart performance ==
In addition to the critical response, the songs performed well commercially across India and globally. The tracks "Raataan Lambiyan" and "Ranjha" were streamed about 8.2 million and 7.3 million times in Spotify, respectively within the week of 20–27 August 2021, and surpassed the weekly streaming records set by the BTS-single "Butter" which recorded 5.1 million streams within a week of its release. Both the tracks were streamed over 5 million times per week in the music platform. "Raataan Lambiyan" featured in the global Spotify charts at #152, becoming the first Hindi song to be featured. The tracks "Raataan Lambiyan", "Ranjha" acquired the first two positions at the Top 200 India list in Spotify, with "Mann Bharryaa 2.0" featured in #5. It was also featured in the Top 100 Charts on iTunes, with "Raataan Lambiyan" and "Ranjha" being featured in the #1 and #3 positions respectively. It became one of the most popular Hindi film music album in Spotify, besides Kabir Singh (2019).

On 1 September 2021, both the tracks were featured in the Billboard Global Excl. U.S. charts with "Raataan Lambiyan" at #28 and "Ranjha" at #73, thereby being the third and fourth Hindi track to join Billboard charts this year, the other two being "Lut Gaye" and "Param Sundari". "Raataan Lambiyan" topped the first position, at #1 spot across Sabras Radio and Sunrise Radio in UK and AXS TV in USA. According to a year-ender survey report published by Apple Music, the tracks "Raataan Lambiyan" and "Ranjha" were featured as one of the most streamed songs in the music platform. "Raataan Lambiyan" was one of the most-viewed tracks on YouTube in 2021, from India.

== Commercial response ==
"With Shershaah's soundtrack, ruling and topping prominent music global charts, we have set a milestone that is unparalleled in the industry. It is fascinating to see how music transcends all geographic and language barriers and plays an instrumental role in bringing people together over their fondness for all things music. Each of the songs have been appreciated for its soothing melody and lyrics making it one of the best Hindi/Bollywood music albums of the year. The numbers are a fitting testament to the overwhelming appreciation and love showered by listeners across India and the world. It is indeed a moment of pride for all of us at Sony Music and we look forward to replicating the same success again."

— Sanujeet Bhujabel, executive director of Sony Music Entertainment, regarding the success of Shershaah's soundtrack.

The album emerged as one of the biggest soundtracks and the fastest Indian album to cross one billion streams in music platforms. Regarding the success of the music album, the film's producer Karan Johar stated that: "It makes me immensely happy that the songs have touched 1 billion audio streams. It feels good to be on the top of the charts and have audiences groove to our tunes." Siddharth Malhotra, the film's lead actor further stated:

"The kind of response 'Shershaah' has received is humbling and I am elated to see the continuous affection. Being my passion project I was deeply involved in the music selection of the film along with Vishnu, Azeem and Karan. We ensured to choose songs which are a right fit for every emotion of the film and I am very happy to see the way audiences have embraced the album. I am grateful to all the artists and singers for this magical album. We are over the moon, grateful to have reached 1 billion audio streams. All thanks to the audience for their love and support."

In 2022, Ormax Media chose Shershaah as the "top Hindi soundtrack of 2021" while "Raataan Lambiyan" (at first position), "Ranjha" and "Mann Bharryaa 2.0" were listed among the "top 10 Hindi songs of 2021". Outlook India-based Samarth Goyal chose "Ranjha" and "Raataan Lambiyan" as one of "the Top 10 Hindi-Pop hits of 2021". Sukanya Verma of Rediff.com chose "Raataan Lambiyan" as one of the Best Hindi Film Song, saying "Brimming with irresistible warmth and melody, the infectious lovey-dovey fervour and playful rhythm of Tanishk Bagchi's charming Punjabi flavoured creation makes it as the most streamed song of the year".

Sankhayan Ghosh of Film Companion chose "Ranjha" as one of the best Hindi film song and stated "‘Ranjha’ works as something you might want to play in a family wedding, but its underlying sadness makes it so much more (used in the film Shershaah as a song of separation of two lovers)". On "recounting the highs and lows of Hindi Film Music in 2021", Devesh Sharma of Filmfare mentioned the album and the songs "Raataan Lambiyan" and "Mann Bharryaa 2.0" in their list. Devarsi Ghosh of Scroll.in chose "Ranjha" in their music year-ender and stated: "Voice-casting a song correctly does wonders. Romy’s rustic voice eases the transition from composer Jasleen Royal’s school-girl vocals about longing to B Praak’s baritone holding forth on the lovers’ plight in the chorus."

== Accolades ==
Award (Note: Awards, festivals and organizations are in alphabetical order.)	Date of ceremony (Note: Date is linked to the article about the awards held that year, wherever possible.)	Category	Recipient(s)	Result	Ref.
Filmfare Awards	30 August 2022	Best Music Director	Tanishk Bagchi, Jasleen Royal, Javed-Mohsin, B Praak, Jaani	Won	
Filmfare Awards	30 August 2022	Best Background Score	John Stuart Eduri	Nominated	
Filmfare Awards	30 August 2022	Best Lyricist	Jaani – (for song "Mann Bharrya 2.0")	Nominated	
Filmfare Awards	30 August 2022	Best Lyricist	Tanishk Bagchi – (for song "Raatan Lambiyan")	Nominated	
Filmfare Awards	30 August 2022	Best Male Playback Singer	B Praak – (for song "Mann Bharrya")	Won	
Filmfare Awards	30 August 2022	Best Male Playback Singer	Jubin Nautiyal – (for song "Raatan Lambiyan")	Nominated	
Filmfare Awards	30 August 2022	Best Female Playback Singer	Asees Kaur – (for song "Raatan Lambiyan")	Won	
FOI Online Awards	23 January 2022	Best Original Song	"Raataan Lambiyan"	Nominated	
FOI Online Awards	23 January 2022	Best Male Playback Singer	Jubin Nautiyal – ("Raataan Lambiyan")	Nominated	
International Indian Film Academy Awards	3–4 June 2022	Best Music Director (Note: Shared with A. R. Rahman for Atrangi Re.)	Tanishk Bagchi, Jasleen Royal, Javed-Mohsin, B Praak, Jaani	Won	
International Indian Film Academy Awards	3–4 June 2022	Best Lyricist	Tanishk Bagchi – (for song "Raatan Lambiyan")	Nominated	
International Indian Film Academy Awards	3–4 June 2022	Best Lyricist	B Praak, Jaani – (for song "Mann Bharrya 2.0")	Nominated	
International Indian Film Academy Awards	3–4 June 2022	Best Male Playback Singer	Jubin Nautiyal – (for song "Raatan Lambiyan")	Won	
International Indian Film Academy Awards	3–4 June 2022	Best Male Playback Singer	B Praak – (for song "Mann Bharrya")	Nominated	
International Indian Film Academy Awards	3–4 June 2022	Best Female Playback Singer	Asees Kaur – (for song "Raatan Lambiyan")	Won	
International Indian Film Academy Awards	3–4 June 2022	Best Female Playback Singer	Jasleen Royal – (for song "Ranjha")	Nominated	
14th Mirchi Music Awards	9 March 2022	Album of The Year	Shershaah	Won	
14th Mirchi Music Awards	9 March 2022	Song of The Year	"Raataan Lambiyan"	Won	
14th Mirchi Music Awards	9 March 2022	Song of The Year	"Ranjha"	Nominated	
14th Mirchi Music Awards	9 March 2022	Song of The Year	"Mann Bharryaa 2.0"	Nominated	
14th Mirchi Music Awards	9 March 2022	Music Composer of The Year	Tanishk Bagchi – ("Raataan Lambiyan")	Won	
14th Mirchi Music Awards	9 March 2022	Music Composer of The Year	Jasleen Royal – ("Ranjha")	Nominated	
14th Mirchi Music Awards	9 March 2022	Male Vocalist of The Year	Jubin Nautiyal – ("Raataan Lambiyan")	Nominated	
14th Mirchi Music Awards	9 March 2022	Female Vocalist of The Year	Asees Kaur – ("Raataan Lambiyan")	Nominated	
14th Mirchi Music Awards	9 March 2022	Lyricist of The Year	Tanishk Bagchi – ("Raataan Lambiyan")	Won	
14th Mirchi Music Awards	9 March 2022	Lyricist of The Year	Jaani – ("Mann Bharryaa 2.0")	Nominated	
14th Mirchi Music Awards	9 March 2022	Lyricist of The Year	Anvita Dutt – ("Ranjha")	Nominated	
14th Mirchi Music Awards	9 March 2022	Listeners' Choice Album of the Year	Shershaah	Nominated	
14th Mirchi Music Awards	9 March 2022	Listeners' Choice Song of the Year	"Raataan Lambiyan"	Nominated	
14th Mirchi Music Awards	9 March 2022	Listeners' Choice Song of the Year	"Ranjha"	Nominated	
14th Mirchi Music Awards	9 March 2022	Listeners' Choice Song of the Year	"Mann Bharryaa 2.0"	Nominated	
