= Mimi (soundtrack) =

Soundtrack album by A. R. Rahman
- Released: 16 July 2021
- Recorded: 2020–2021
- Studios: Panchathan Record Inn and AM Studios, Chennai; A. R. Studios, Mumbai
- Genre: Feature film soundtrack
- Length: 28:00
- Language: Hindi
- Label: Sony Music India
- Producer: A. R. Rahman

A. R. Rahman chronology
Dil Bechara (2020)	Mimi (2021)	Atrangi Re (2021)

Mimi is the soundtrack to the 2021 film of the same name. The album featured seven songs composed by A. R. Rahman and featured lyrics written by Amitabh Bhattacharya. The soundtrack was led by the single "Param Sundari" that was released on 16 July 2021 along with the album, distributed by Sony Music India. The soundtrack received mixed reviews from critics.

== Track listing ==
No.	Title	Singer(s)	Length
1.	"Param Sundari"	Shreya Ghoshal	3:20
2.	"Rihaayi De"	A. R. Rahman	6:05
3.	"Yaane Yaane"	Rakshita Suresh	3:24
4.	"Hututu"	Shashaa Tirupati	3:52
5.	"Phuljhadiyon"	Shilpa Rao	2:59
6.	"Choti Si Chiraiya"	Kailash Kher	4:35
7.	"Rock A Bye Baby"	Julia Gartha, Khatija Rahman	3:45
Total length:			28:00

== Reception ==
Vipin Nair of Music Aloud wrote in its review that "the soundtrack had fairly low expectations, but it had thrown up a surprise with a very diverse and engaging set of songs" and gave 3.5 out of 5. A critic from The Humming Heart gave a score 8 out of 10 and said "Mimi may not be a top-shelf Hindi mainstream soundtrack of A. R. Rahman. But, this is a lovely low-key album with tunes that might pay off with revisits in the years to come." Stacey Yount of BollySpice summarised that Rahman "has created an outstanding set of songs for the story and scenes in the film that enhances what is going on onscreen". Sankhayan Ghosh of Film Companion wrote "An album become an extension of its themes, and regardless how the film turns out has a life of its own. Which is not to say that Mimi will bowl you over after a round of casual listening–it doesn't have an outrageously new "sound", an expectation we have come to attach with Rahman with every album of his, major or minor."

Joginder Tuteja of Bollywood Hungama criticised the music as "average and could have been better" but praised the background score as it "enhances the emotions depicted in the film". Jyoti Kanyal of India Today wrote "While the songs complement the storyline and go with the plot, they fail to leave any long-lasting impact." Sukanya Verma of Rediff.com said that Rahman's songs are "filled with soul"; she further stated "Rihaayi De" being similar to "Tu Bin Bataaye" from Rang De Basanti (2006) and "elevates the film's ordinariness to work of depth".

== Commercial performance ==
The song "Param Sundari" attained popularity from listeners, with fans and celebrities covering their own versions of their song. In October 2021, the song debuted at number 184 on the Billboard Global Excl. U.S. charts; the fourth Hindi song of that year to debut at Billboard charts, following "Raataan Lambiyan" and "Ranjha" from Shershaah (2021) and the individual single "Lut Gaye".

In 2022, Ormax Media listed Mimi in the fifth place as one of the "top Hindi soundtrack of 2021" and "Param Sundari" as the sixth among the "top 10 Hindi songs of 2021". "Param Sundari" was chosen as one of "the Top 10 Hindi songs of 2021" by Samarth Goyal of Outlook India and Sukanya Verma of Rediff.com. Sankhayan Ghosh of Film Companion chose "Param Sundari" and "Rihaayi De", and Deversh Sharma of Filmfare, on "recounting the highs and lows of Hindi Film Music in 2021" mentioned "Param Sundari" as the album's standout song.

== Accolades ==
In addition to the aforementioned nominations and awards, the soundtrack was submitted for the Best Compilation Soundtrack for Visual Media at the 64th Annual Grammy Awards despite not being shortlisted.

Award (Note: Awards, festivals and organizations are in alphabetical order.)	Date of ceremony (Note: Date is linked to the article about the awards held that year, wherever possible.)	Category	Recipient(s)	Result	Ref.
Filmfare Awards	30 August 2022	Best Music Director	A. R. Rahman	Nominated	
Filmfare Awards	30 August 2022	Best Female Playback Singer	Shreya Ghoshal (for "Param Sundari")	Nominated	
International Indian Film Academy Awards	3–4 June 2022	Best Female Playback Singer	Shreya Ghoshal (for "Param Sundari")	Nominated	
Mirchi Music Awards	19 March 2022	Female Vocalist of The Year	Shreya Ghoshal (for "Param Sundari")	Nominated	
Mirchi Music Awards	19 March 2022	Upcoming Female Vocalist of The Year	Khatija Rahman (for "Rock-A-Bye Baby")	Nominated	
Mirchi Music Awards	19 March 2022	Upcoming Female Vocalist of The Year	Rakshita Suresh (for "Yaane Yaane")	Nominated	
Mirchi Music Awards	19 March 2022	Best Song Producer – Programming & Arranging	A. R. Rahman (for "Param Sundari")	Won	
Mirchi Music Awards	19 March 2022	Best Song Engineer – Recording & Mixing	Nakul Abhyankar and Suresh Permal (for "Param Sundari")	Nominated	
