= M. P. Ahammed =

Indian businessman (born 1957)

- Born: 1 November 1957 (age 68); Kozhikode, Kerala, India
- Occupation: Businessman
- Years active: 1991 – present
- Organization: Malabar Gold & Diamonds
- Known for: Chairman of Malabar Group of Companies
- Title: Founder and chairperson
- Spouse: K. P. Subaida
- Children: 2

M. P. Ahammed (born 1 November 1957) is an Indian businessman and the chairman of the Malabar Group of Companies. He is the founder of Malabar Gold & Diamonds, one of the world's largest retail jewellery groups.

== Early life and career ==
M. P. Ahammed was born on 1 November 1957 in Kozhikode, Kerala to Mammad Kutty Hajee and Fathima, in a family involved in trade and agriculture. He completed his schooling at the Government High School in Kozhikode and later earned a Bachelor of Commerce degree from the University of Calicut.

At the age of 17, Ahammed ventured into business by establishing an agro-products firm. By 1981, he expanded into trading spices and copra. In 1993, he founded Malabar Gold & Diamonds in Kozhikode, with an initial capital of ₹50 lakh. Under his leadership, the company has grown into one of the world's largest jewelry retailers, with over 340 showrooms across 13 countries.

According to The Economic Times, Malabar Gold & Diamonds reported revenues of ₹120 billion in 2012, which increased to ₹220 billion in 2013.

== Philanthropy ==
Ahammed is involved in philanthropic initiatives through the Malabar Group, including the Hunger Free World project, which provides nutritious meals to those in need, and the Grandma Home initiative, which provides free accommodations for underprivileged women in Bengaluru and Hyderabad, with plans to expand to other major cities.

== Personal life ==
Ahammed is married to K. P. Subaida. They have two children. His son Shamlal Ahammed is the company's managing director of international operations.
