= Pagglait (soundtrack) =

2021 soundtrack album by Arijit Singh

Soundtrack album by Arijit Singh
- Released: 10 March 2021
- Recorded: 2020–2021
- Genre: Feature film soundtrack
- Length: 1:33:43
- Language: Hindi
- Label: Oriyon Music
- Producers: Arijit Singh; Sunny M.R.
External audio
- Official Audio Jukebox on YouTube

Pagglait is the soundtrack album composed by playback singer Arijit Singh, in his debut as a music composer. It is the soundtrack for the 2021 Hindi-language black comedy film of the same name released on Netflix. Directed by Umesh Bist and produced by Shobha Kapoor, Ekta Kapoor, Guneet Monga, Achin Jain of Balaji Motion Pictures and Sikhya Entertainment, the film stars Sanya Malhotra, Shruti Sharma, Ashutosh Rana and Raghubir Yadav in lead roles. Singh wrote the lyrics for some of the songs along with Neelesh Misra which had 24 tracks in total; eight original songs, two revisited and reprised versions of three tracks, originally composed, and 12 instrumental compositions from the film's background score. The soundtrack was released through Arijit's own label Oriyon Music on 10 March 2021 to positive critical response.

== Background ==
On 7 March 2021, Guneet Monga of Sikhya Entertainment, one of the film's producers announced that playback singer Arijit Singh will create the tunes for the film, which will also make his debut as the music director. Singh initially stated his entry through music direction, when he liked one of the film Haraamkhor, he spoke to Guneet, who produced the film, requesting her that if she has good scripts like this, she must tell him to try his hands on music composing and was his intention to do so. When Guneet came up with the script of Pagglait, he was impressed by the writing and decided to set the tunes for the film. In an interview with Hindustan Times, Singh stated that "I wanted to get associated with good scripts, but I didn't look for it that way, it came to me. I didn't plan it. Generally, I wouldn't give so much time to scripts. If I have given almost two years of creative time to this film, with great passion, I have understood the intricacies of the narrative".

== Development ==
"The film has a well-etched graph and I had a proper brief for every scene, I had the opportunity of emotional cut points — both high and low — and there was an ebb and flow in the dynamic of the whole album. We had clear notes of what we are going to do and that's how we worked. We started locking the pieces and that's how the journey went."

— Arijit Singh on the musical approach of Pagglait in his interview with Telegraph India

Singh added that the producers wanted four songs as a sample first, but he was nervous in doing so due to his attempt on composition for the first time. Hence, he asked the producers to use the original songs he composed, if they liked it [or] might communicate with other composers to produce the songs, instead he will compose the background score. However the team liked the sample songs he produced and then Arijit decided to come up with an album of 24 tracks.

All the songs were curated during the COVID-19 lockdown in India, where Arijit travelled to his native house in Murshidabad-Jiaganj block in West Bengal during his quarantine period. He set up his music studio with the minimal instruments he kept in store. The film had the first draft of the written script and the shot script, synchronised in the same pace, which made him felt easier as "he did not need a re-work on his compositions". The album had revisited and reprised versions of the soundtrack album, in his intention to introduce new artists who are vocally talented. As the director chose all voices for the album, the composer went with multiple renditions. Prominent lyricist Neelesh Misra, worked on the film's soundtrack after a four-year long break since Jagga Jasoos (2017); about the long hiatus, Misra said that "he could not connect with the entire process of lyric writing".

The film had five female singers — Neeti Mohan, Himani Kapoor, Antara Mitra, Meghna Mishra, Chinmayi Sripada, Sumana Banerjee and Jhumpa Mondal — so as to surround the character Sandhya (Sanya Malhotra). Arijit's sister Amrita Singh also sung three tracks; the title track, "Phire Faqeera" and "Pagal" — which had rap segments crooned by Raftaar and Raja Kumari. Himani Kapoor who sang the track "Thode Kam Ajnabi" and its reprised version said that she was approached by Singh during August 2020, when he announced his debut as music director in the film. She was excited, and started working on the song during September 2020 in Chandigarh. During a live session before release, Himani stated about Arijit stated her inclusion in a hilarious manner saying "only a 'pagal' (mad) girl can sing a song for the film Pagglait".

== Track listing ==
Before announcing his debut, Arijit Singh stated that the album will be dedicated to composer A. R. Rahman whom he has been guided through his approach to classical music and passion for soundscape. Three days after Singh announced his debut (on 10 March 2021), he released the entire soundtrack album through music platforms, and the video of the title track, the same day. On 11 March, the soundtrack was uploaded through jukebox format in YouTube.

All tracks are written by Neelesh Misra.

No.	Title	Singer(s)	Length
1.	"Dill Udd Jaa Re"	Neeti Mohan, Sunny M.R.	5:03
2.	"Thode Kam Ajnabi"	Himani Kapoor	4:58
3.	"Phire Faqeera"	Raja Kumari, Amrita Singh, Arijit Singh	5:41
4.	"Meera's Poem"	Jhumpa Mondal	3:35
5.	"Pagglait" (Title Track)	Amrita Singh, Raftaar, Arijit Singh	3:49
6.	"Lamha"	Antara Mitra	3:38
7.	"Radha's Poem"	Chinmayi Sripada	3:42
8.	"Dil Udd Ja Re" (Revisited)	Meghna Mishra, Arijit Singh	5:34
9.	"Lamha" (Reprise)	Sumana Banerjee	4:20
10.	"Thode Kam Ajnabi" (Reprise)	Himani Kapoor, Arijit Singh	5:01
11.	"Pagal"	Raja Kumari, Amrita Singh	5:38
12.	"Lamha" (Revisited)	Antara Mitra, Arijit Singh	3:39
13.	"Designs Are Movement Of Life"	Arijit Singh	1:24
14.	"Loss Is All That Is Left"	Arijit Singh	1:16
15.	"Desire Makes Reality"	Arijit Singh	7:36
16.	"Confusion"	Arijit Singh	1:23
17.	"Choice And Decision"	Arijit Singh	8:33
18.	"Beraho" (Love Is Melancholic)	Arijit Singh	6:10
19.	"A Prayer"	Arijit Singh	1:30
20.	"Every Time When I Realise"	Arijit Singh	3:45
21.	"A Catalyst Thought"	Arijit Singh	1:51
22.	"New Beginning"	Arijit Singh	1:14
23.	"Holding On To The Last Attachment"	Arijit Singh	3:13
24.	"On Beautiful Unknown"	Arijit Singh	1:10
Total length:			1:33:43

== Reception ==
Both Sankhayan Ghosh of Film Companion and Vipin Nair of Music Aloud pointed that the length of the soundtrack is more than the film's duration which is an hour and a half, as the team released the entire background score along with the songs, which increased the number of tracks and duration. However, the reviewers praised Arijit's maiden attempt in music composition as well as releasing the album under his own label (Oriyon Music) ensuring the creative freedom on processing the album. While the former stated in his review that "Arijit is melodically gifted as a composer and his songs for Pagglait mark a return to the Hindi film melody in the age of recycled tunes. You may not love each and every track, but there's no denying that this is an uncompromising labour of love. And there is a lot to love", the latter added "Arijit Singh has produced the finest composing debut has been an immensely pleasurable soundtrack to listen to."

Devarsi Ghosh of Scroll.in criticised the soundtrack's length stating that "the album could have been wrapped up in 25 minutes if [Arijit] Singh hadn't included alternate versions of nearly every tune and thrown in the background score as well". He praised lyricist Neelesh Misra stating that "his lyrics dwell on loss when not offering hope. His choice of words is simplistic, but never Sameer [Anjaan]-level trite". Among all the songs he praised "Phire Faqeera" as the only great track in the album, adding that the song is a confluence of hip-hop, rock, and electronica. He further added that with the exception of the title track, melancholy runs through the album to various degrees". Ghosh further listed the album in his Best of 2021 soundtracks year-ender review. Joginder Tuteja of Bollywood Hungama stated that "The album is a mix of good classical music with a touch of rock and rap. While some songs will strike a chord with you instantly, the rest will eventually grow on you."

In the film review for Firstpost, critic-author Anna M. M. Vetticad stated about the music saying "The only break in Pagglait's tone comes with the song Phire Faqeera playing in the background at one point. Phire Faqeera feels over-crowded and noisy, and suffers from an A. R. Rahman hangover, without the perfect harmony that is Rahman's signature. The title track is generic, but Dil Udd Ja Re'and Thode Kam Ajnabi are pleasantly pensive albeit too similar sounding to each other. The most commendable aspect of the album is that Singh has filled it with female singers, which is unusual even for women-centred Bollywood films. Neeti Mohan is lovely, and I love the buttery-voiced Himani Kapoor who sings Thode Kam Ajnabi." Aishwarya Vasudevan of Daily News and Analysis, stated "Arijit Singh as a debutant music director has done a stupendous job and the songs deserve everyone's undivided attention." Stating the music as its biggest asset, Vibha Maru, in her review for India Today, wrote "Songs like Thode Kam Ajnabi, Dill Udd Jaa Re and Lamha provides the emotional arc to the film and blends effortlessly with different sequences."

Suanshu Khurana of The Indian Express mentioned the soundtrack in his year-ender review and stated that the album "brought the old-world nostalgia". He called it as a "very intelligently crafted album with folk merging into contemporary with much finesse" and concluded "The best bit was the background score, which was absolutely charming". On recounting the highs and the lows of the Hindi film music, Devesh Sharma of Filmfare had stated "Arijit's decent debut album incorporates different musical styles". Sharma (as was Ghosh) had opined that Singh had influenced the works of composers A. R. Rahman, Amit Trivedi and Pritam, whom he had frequently collaborated as singer, and had incorporated in the album. He also added that "Neelesh Misra's lyrics are in sync with the bitter-sweet nature of the film". Calling "Phire Faqeera" as one of "Bollywood's Best Songs of 2021", Sukanya Verma of Rediff.com wrote: "Arijit Singh's reverence for Rahman manifests itself most strikingly in this funky, eclectic number from his debut as music director. Its existentialist lyrics by Neelesh Mishra are equally impressive."

== Awards and nominations ==
Award	Date of ceremony	Category	Recipient(s)	Result	Ref.
FOI Online Awards	23 January 2022	Best Original Song	"Phire Faqeera"	Won	
FOI Online Awards	23 January 2022	Best Original Song	"Thode Kam Ajnabi"	Nominated	
FOI Online Awards	23 January 2022	Best Music Direction (Songs)	Arijit Singh	Nominated	
FOI Online Awards	23 January 2022	Best Music Direction (Score)	Arijit Singh	Nominated	
FOI Online Awards	23 January 2022	Best Playback Singer – Female	Himani Kapoor – ("Thode Kam Ajnabi")	Won	
FOI Online Awards	23 January 2022	Best Lyricist	Neelesh Misra – ("Phire Faqeera")	Won	
FOI Online Awards	23 January 2022	Best Lyricist	Neelesh Misra – ("Thode Kam Ajnabi")	Nominated	
