= Gulabo Sitabo (soundtrack) =

2020 soundtrack album by Shantanu Moitra, Abhishek Arora and Anuj Garg

Soundtrack album by Shantanu Moitra, Abhishek Arora and Anuj Garg
- Released: 22 May 2020
- Genre: Feature film soundtrack
- Length: 30:45
- Language: Hindi
- Label: Zee Music Company
External audio
- Official Audio Jukebox on YouTube

Gulabo Sitabo is the soundtrack to the 2020 Hindi-language comedy-drama film of the same name directed by Shoojit Sircar and written by Juhi Chaturvedi. The film's music was composed by Shantanu Moitra, Abhishek Arora and Anuj Garg with lyrics written by Puneet Sharma, Dinesh Pant and Vinod Dubey. Shanthanu Moitra also composed the film score. It was released by Zee Music Company on 22 May 2020.

== Background ==
The 10-track soundtrack album has a running time of 30 minutes and it features ten tunes; eight songs, reprised versions of two tracks from the original songs, and two themes. Shantanu Moitra composed four tracks, including the themes, while also taking charge of the background score. Abhishek Arora composed one track – "Jootam Phenk", while Anuj Garg composed three songs – "Madari Ka Bandar", "Do Din Ka Ye Mela", "Budhau" and the reprised versions of the latter two. All tracks are sung by Tochi Raina, Piyush Mishra, Mika Singh, Vinod Dubey, Anuj Garg, Bhanwari Devi, Rahul Ram and Bobby Cash. All the tracks are fused with folk genre, with diversely ranging from Baul, Rajasthani and Uttar Pradeshi folk, to rock and country music. It used wide range of instruments from guitar, clarinet, mandolin, banjo, ukulele and other stringed instruments.

While the entire soundtrack was released earlier, on 27 May, the video song of "Jootam Phenk" was released through YouTube, while the second video song "Madari Ka Bandar" released on 3 June 2020.

== Reception ==
The music received highly positive response from critics. Vipin Nair, a music critic, whose reviews about the soundtrack, were published in his website Music Aloud and in the English-language Indian newspaper The Hindu, which appeared first, stated it as the "best soundtrack that has featured in Shoojit Sircar and Ayushmann Khurrana's films in a very long time" and stated it as an "earthy earworm through". In his review for The Indian Express, Suanshu Khurana gave 3.5 stars and stated it as "an excellent example of theme-based music, producing the kind of tracks not usual in mainstream Bollywood music scene". He further stated the score of the film as "tender and edgy, which looks at life’s spiritual journey through melodic structures that are quirky and full of nuance". Devarshi Ghosh of Scroll.in stated the soundtrack as "different from the music of Hindi movies this year. That's not just because all its tracks are original compositions, but also because it works as a standalone concept album, wherein a specific musical vocabulary and thematic concerns in the lyrics are to be found across all the songs. You can’t pluck any one track and put it in any stock situation." In addition to the review, Ghosh listed it in Best of 2020: Hindi music in films and television, a year-ender article for Scroll.in.

Critic based as Musicplus gave 8/10 to the soundtrack and further praised the "uniformity in sound and theme" despite having three composers, while also appreciating the choice of singers, instrumentation and fusion of genres. Joginder Tuteja, however criticised the soundtrack, saying it as "forgettable". A reviewer from The Humming Heart gave the soundtrack 7.5 out of 10 and stated: "The length of the Gulabo Sitabo album made one wonder if the film will be overloaded with music. However, Sircar, who has historically been pretty judicious with the usage of music onscreen, demonstrates a full-length album can be used with a modern approach in a featured film. With the entire look and feel of Gulabo Sitabo centring around the old and lost riches of what was once a grand and opulent Awadh, the music really finds resonance." Pallabi Dey Puryakastha of The Times of India, gave 3.5 stars to the film's music saying "Shantanu Moitra's original score and the soundtrack earns some brownie points for its quirky tunes that come with deep, meaningful and honest lyrics by Dinesh Pant, Puneet Sharma and Vinod Dubey". The film's soundtrack was also mentioned in Mixtape 2020, an article for Film Companion's Year Ender Special, and in another article written by Amit Gurbaxani about Indian film music in 2020 for Firstpost.

== Track listing ==
| No. | Title | Lyrics | Music | Singer(s) | Length |
|---|---|---|---|---|---|
| 1. | "Madari Ka Bandar" | Dinesh Pant | Anuj Garg | Tochi Raina, Anuj Garg | 4:10 |
| 2. | "Jootam Phenk" | Puneet Sharma | Abhishek Arora | Piyush Mishra | 2:07 |
| 3. | "Kanjoos" | Puneet Sharma | Shantanu Moitra | Mika Singh | 2:50 |
| 4. | "Kya Leke Aayo Jagme" | Vinod Dubey | Shantanu Moitra | Vinod Dubey | 3:01 |
| 5. | "Do Din Ka Ye Mela" (Reprise) | Dinesh Pant | Anuj Garg | Tochi Raina | 3:33 |
| 6. | "Budhau" (Reprise) | Dinesh Pant | Anuj Garg | Bhanwari Devi | 3:15 |
| 7. | "Do Din Ka Ye Mela" | Dinesh Pant | Anuj Garg | Rahul Ram | 3:33 |
| 8. | "Budhau" | Dinesh Pant | Anuj Garg | Bobby Cash | 3:38 |
| 9. | "Gulabo Sitabo Theme" | — | Shantanu Moitra | — | 3:41 |
| 10. | "Gulabo Sitabo Clarinet Theme" | — | Shantanu Moitra | — | 0:56 |
| Total length: | | | | | 30:45 |
