= Ludo (soundtrack) =

Soundtrack album by Pritam
- Released: 13 November 2020
- Genre: Feature film soundtrack
- Length: 26:48
- Language: Hindi
- Label: T-Series
- Producer: Pritam

Pritam chronology
Love Aaj Kal (2020)	Ludo (2020)	Tadap (2021)
External audio
- Official Audio Jukebox on YouTube

Ludo is the soundtrack album composed by Pritam to the 2020 Hindi-language Netflix film of the same name directed by Anurag Basu. The film features an ensemble cast of Abhishek Bachchan, Aditya Roy Kapur, Rajkummar Rao, Sanya Malhotra, Pearle Maaney, Pankaj Tripathi, Fatima Sana Shaikh, Rohit Suresh Saraf, Shalini Vatsa, and Inayat Varma. The soundtrack to the film features seven songs, with lyrics written by Sayeed Quadri, Swanand Kirkire, Sandeep Srivatsava and Shloke Lal, and was released on 28 October 2020 by the T-Series record label.

According to the composer and director, the soundtrack is the toughest to compose, as the film is a multi-narrative storyline and needed the song to be suited in the situation. It was composed by Pritam at his own house in Kolkata, during the COVID-19 pandemic lockdown in India. Pritam opined that "the songs he has created for the film are simple melodies that give you a break from the edginess and twists and chaos that the film offers".

The soundtrack received positive response from music critics and listeners, who were appreciative of Pritam's composition, lyrics and the placement of the songs suiting the film's narrative. The tracks — "Aabaad Barbaad", "Hardum Humdum" and "Meri Tum Ho", which released earlier as singles, were chartbusters and topped the music and radio charts. Following the response to the album, Pritam won the Filmfare Award for Best Music Director at the 66th edition of the ceremony held during March 2021; his fifth Filmfare Award, he won in this category.

== Development ==
The album marks the fifth collaboration between Pritam and Anurag Basu, followed by Gangster (2006), Life in a... Metro (2007), Barfi! (2012) and Jagga Jasoos (2017). According to Basu and Pritam, the soundtrack to Ludo is considered to be the toughest albums to crack as "while writing the story of the film, the songs did not come organically, as the film is centered on multiple narratives that conjoin together. As a result, in several sequences the placement of the songs might slow down the screenplay and the tune must be composed according to the situation and pace". In case of Pritam's earlier films with Basu, the songs for the film were composed even before the start of production, since Basu believed that film music might play an integral part in the storyline. The soundtrack was created and composed in entirety during the COVID-19 pandemic lockdown in India at Pritam's own house in Kolkata. He stated that "the process of composing the tracks during the lockdown is a difficult task. It took me four days to compose one song for the album, where under normal circumstances, the song composition would take a day's time."

Pritam composed the tune of one song and showcased to the filmmaker during the film's scripting process. Basu liked the track and had decided to use it in one of his future films. When the scripting was ready and the film began production, Anurag Basu asked Pritam to complete the song which he agreed and decided to use the track after the producer Bhushan Kumar's approval. That song eventually became "Hardum Humdum", written by Sayeed Quadri and sung by Arijit Singh. In an interview with Grazia India, Basu stated that the song was initially set to be used for Metro 2, a sequel to the duo's earlier collaboration Life in a... Metro. When the film did not materialise as planned, he used the track to this film.

Bhushan Kumar, the film's producer stated in an interview to The Times of India, saying "The songs are interspersed with the story in such a way that they can’t be separated from the narrative. What is also striking is that in a film like this is that, people don’t expect soft, romantic tracks. They expect grunge and heavy stuff. The songs are melodious and slow-starters, and they grow on you." He further appreciated Pritam and Basu, for working on the tracks and bundle in with the storyline, that the film will seem incomplete without the songs. In addition to the songs, director Anurag Basu reused the track "Qismat Ki Hawa Kabhi Naram" from Albela (1951), a popular track composed by C. Ramchandra. Basu stated that "There was a situation where Sattu is singing. We had the option of making a new song or use an existing one. If I had made a song, it would be on the same lines. So I got the rights. It is a sweet song and something that I have grown up listening." The popular track "Pistah" from the Malayalam-Tamil film Neram (2013), was also reused for one scene in the film.

== Album information ==
The film features four songs, however, the soundtrack to the film, consisted of seven songs, with three alternative versions of the tracks. The first song "Aabaad Barbaad", sung by Arijit Singh and written by Sandeep Shrivatsava was released on 21 October 2020, which was picturised on Aditya Roy Kapur and Sanya Malhotra's segment. "Hardum Humdum", also sung by Singh and featuring lyrics written by Sayeed Quadri is the second track from the album, that was released on 25 October. It is a montage track that takes the story forward and binds three narratives together. While, the original version consisted of a duration of 3 minutes, the track was extended to 4 minutes when it was featured in the film. The track also features a female version, sung by Shilpa Rao and additional lines written by Shloke Lal. The track "Meri Tum Ho", sung by Jubin Nautiyal and Ash King, with lyrics written by Sandeep Shrivatsava and Shloke Lal, is pictured on Abhishek's Bachchan segment, showcasing the love for his father and daughter. It was released on 28 October, the same day, the rest of the soundtrack being unveiled. As the film being released on a digital platform, Bhushan Kumar believed that "it is hard for a music albums of films premiering on digital platforms, to get better reach, unlike the soundtracks of theatrically released films", hence Kumar also promoted the soundtrack to the film.

== Track listing ==
No.	Title	Lyrics	Singer(s)	Length
1.	"Aabaad Barbaad"	Sandeep Shrivastava	Arijit Singh	5:09
2.	"Hardum Humdum" (Male)	Sayeed Quadri	Arijit Singh	3:08
3.	"Meri Tum Ho"	Sandeep Shrivastava, Shloke Lal	Jubin Nautiyal, Ash King	3:47
4.	"Dil Julaha"	Swanand Kirkire	Darshan Raval	3:38
5.	"Hardum Humdum" (Film Version)	Sayeed Quadri	Arijit Singh	4:25
6.	"Meri Tum Ho" (Unplugged)	Sandeep Shrivastava, Shloke Lal	Jubin Nautiyal, Ash King	3:33
7.	"Hardum Humdum" (Female)	Sayeed Quadri, Shloke Lal	Shilpa Rao	3:08
Total length:				26:48

== Reception ==
Vipin Nair of Music Aloud gave the soundtrack 4 out of 5, saying "Pritam does still manage to produce a top-drawer set for Anurag Basu". Rony Patra of LetsOTT, gave 3.25 stars and said "Ludo's soundtrack suits the crazy narrative of the film and is another winning entry in the list of Pritam-Anurag Basu collaborations". Anish Mohanty of Planet Bollywood gave 3.5 out of 5 and called it as "a fairly modest soundtrack". He further wrote "The album has just three four original tracks and three alternate versions of three of the songs. Quantity, of course, is not a yardstick you measure the worth of an album with. Each of the seven tracks in the album is of very high quality and ensures that this turns out to be yet another memorable album from the Anurag Basu–Pritam combination." Joginder Tuteja of Bollywood Hungama criticised the soundtrack, saying that except for "Aabaad Barbaad", the rest of the tracks are poor. Aishwarya Vasudevan of DNA News, stated the album as "soothing".

Ludo's soundtrack was mentioned in Mixtape 2020, an article for Film Companion's Year Ender Special, written by author Sankhayan Ghosh. The film's soundtrack was further listed by Devarsi Ghosh in Best of 2020: Hindi music in films and television, a year-ender article for Scroll.in, and in another article written by Amit Gurbaxani about Indian film music in 2020 for Firstpost. "Aabaad Barbaad" was listed in the first position, according to India Today's "Top 10 Bollywood Songs of 2020". "Aabaad Barbaad" was the most streamed song of Apple Music according to a year-ender survey report.
