= Love Aaj Kal (2009 soundtrack) =

Soundtrack album by Pritam
- Released: 27 June 2009
- Recorded: 2009
- Genre: Feature film soundtrack
- Length: 45:59
- Language: Hindi
- Label: Eros Music (Note: After Eros International had sold the assets of the music to Sony Music India, much of the Eros Music catalog acquisitions (except for the co-acquisitions with other labels) are with Sony.)
- Producer: Pritam Chakraborty

Pritam chronology
New York (2009)	Love Aaj Kal (2009)	Life Partner (2009)

Love Aaj Kal is the soundtrack album to the 2009 film of the same name directed by Imtiaz Ali, starring Saif Ali Khan and Deepika Padukone. The album featured 10 songs composed by Pritam with lyrics written by Irshad Kamil. The album was released through Eros Music on 27 June 2009, becoming a critical and commercial success with the songs becoming chartbusters. The album earned Pritam his first IIFA Award for Best Music Director, in addition to a nomination for the Filmfare Award for Best Music Director.

== Background ==
The soundtrack of "Love Aaj Kal" was composed by Pritam reuniting with Imtiaz Ali after their successful collaboration in Jab We Met (2007). He composed seven original songs for the film which had written by Irshad Kamil. Since the film is set in two different time periods, the songs had a distinctive touch ranging from pop, rock and modern music, balanced with melodic numbers while also having Punjabi influences in the soundtrack. Pritam admitted that he had inflused a mix of songs in the album, where the period portion sounds were in contrast to the modern instruments used in the album, especially in the song "Twist", where he had sampled "Man Dole", composed by Hemant Kumar for Nagin (1954) in it.

In the song "Aahun Aahun", Pritam used the melody and part of the lyrics of "Bolve" composed by Sukshinder Shinda for his independent album Moving & Grooving (2000), and in "Aaj Din Chadheya", the first verse belonged to the poet Shiv Kumar Batalvi. Pritam added those in credits to counter the plagiarism allegations levied against him, even though they were not the core tune's inspiration. Pritam noted that the orchestration of "Chor Bazaari" was initially set to a "dholak-duff type track" but later changed it to a hip hop dance number after watching the visuals. Three of the songs were remixed by DJ Sanj. Salim–Sulaiman composed the film score. Pritam revealed in a 2014 interview that Imtiaz Ali wanted A. R. Rahman to compose the music of the film, but the latter was available only for his next, Rockstar (2011).

== Track listing ==
No.	Title	Singer(s)	Length
1.	"Twist"	Neeraj Shridhar, Suzanne D'Mello, Saif Ali Khan	5:01
2.	"Chor Bazaari"	Neeraj Shridhar, Sunidhi Chauhan	4:19
3.	"Aahun Aahun"	Master Saleem, Neeraj Shridhar, Suzanne D'Mello	4:45
4.	"Dooriyaan"	Mohit Chauhan	5:36
5.	"Aaj Din Chadheya"	Rahat Fateh Ali Khan	5:17
6.	"Thoda Thoda Pyaar"	Sunidhi Chauhan	4:04
7.	"Main Kya Hoon"	KK	5:48
8.	"Twist" (Remix)	Neeraj Shridhar	4:04
9.	"Chor Bazaari" (Remix)	Neeraj Shridhar, Sunidhi Chauhan	3:50
10.	"Aahun Aahun" (Remix)	Master Saleem, Neeraj Shridhar	4:36

== Reception ==
=== Critical reception ===
The music of the film received highly positive reviews from critics. Joginder Tuteja of Bollywood Hungama noted, that "each and every song turns out to be extremely good in an album" in Love Aaj Kal and poised it to be "unstoppable once it hits the stands". Chandrima Pal of Rediff.com called the album being "fun, young and endearing" and further stated, "The strength of Love Aaj Kal, lies in the unhurried pace and the variety in the choice of genres, arrangement, treatment." Ruchika Kher from Hindustan Times noted, "Pritam has done a good job with the soundtrack and created songs that are sure to become hits."

Anand Vaishnav of News18 called it a mix of "situational tracks and guaranteed chartbusters" where he considered the "distinction is evident in the music, as it is set in two different times and is one of the most complete albums in recent times." Karthik Srinivasan of Bangalore Mirror wrote "[O]verall, Love Aaj Kal's soundtrack has everything one expects — take a bow, Pritam!" Calling it "addictive, diverse and enjoyable", Steve Chatha of BBC added that the album had "enough quality on show to maintain Pritam's reputation".

=== Commercial reception ===
According to Box Office India, with around 1,600,000 units (1.6 million units) sold, this film's soundtrack was the eighth highest-best-selling album of the year. "Aahun Aahun" was subsequently being listed in the "Top 10 Bollywood Songs of 2009" by The Times of India and Sify. All the songs in the film were chartbusters, with The Times of India admitting that the songs are still reminiscent even in the current period. Nirmikha Singh of Rolling Stone India added that the album as well as the soundtracks of Singh Is Kinng (2008) and Ajab Prem Ki Ghazab Kahani (2009) "dominated playlists at sangeet parties and Bollywood club nights for at least a decade".

== Accolades ==
Award	Date of ceremony (Note: Date is linked to the article about the awards held that year, wherever possible.)	Category	Recipient(s)	Result	Ref.
Filmfare Awards	27 February 2010	Best Music Director	Pritam	Nominated	
Filmfare Awards	27 February 2010	Best Lyricist	Irshad Kamil for "Aaj Din Chadheya"	Won	
Filmfare Awards	27 February 2010	Best Male Playback Singer	Rahat Fateh Ali Khan for "Aaj Din Chadheya"	Nominated	
Filmfare Awards	27 February 2010	Best Female Playback Singer	Sunidhi Chauhan for "Chor Bazaari"	Nominated	
Filmfare Awards	27 February 2010	Best Choreography	Bosco–Caesar for "Chor Bazaari"	Won	
International Indian Film Academy Awards	5 June 2010	Best Music Director	Pritam	Won	
International Indian Film Academy Awards	5 June 2010	Best Lyricist	Irshad Kamil for "Aaj Din Chadheya"	Nominated	
International Indian Film Academy Awards	5 June 2010	Best Male Playback Singer	Rahat Fateh Ali Khan for "Aaj Din Chadheya"	Nominated	
International Indian Film Academy Awards	5 June 2010	Best Female Playback Singer	Sunidhi Chauhan for "Chor Bazaari"	Nominated	
International Indian Film Academy Awards	5 June 2010	Best Choreography	Bosco–Caesar for "Chor Bazaari"	Won	
Mirchi Music Awards	10 February 2010	Album of The Year	Love Aaj Kal – Pritam	Nominated	
Mirchi Music Awards	10 February 2010	Male Vocalist of The Year	Rahat Fateh Ali Khan for "Aaj Din Chadheya"	Nominated	
Producers Guild Film Awards	8 January 2010	Best Music Director	Pritam	Won	
Producers Guild Film Awards	8 January 2010	Best Lyricist	Irshad Kamil for "Twist"	Nominated	
Producers Guild Film Awards	8 January 2010	Best Male Playback Singer	Mohit Chauhan for "Yeh Dooriyaan"	Won	
Producers Guild Film Awards	8 January 2010	Best Female Playback Singer	Sunidhi Chauhan for "Chor Bazaari"	Nominated	
Screen Awards	9 January 2010	Best Music Director	Pritam	Nominated	
Screen Awards	9 January 2010	Best Lyricist	Irshad Kamil for "Chor Bazaari"	Won	
Screen Awards	9 January 2010	Best Male Playback Singer	Rahat Fateh Ali Khan for "Aaj Din Chadheya"	Won	
Screen Awards	9 January 2010	Best Editing	Aarti Bajaj	Nominated	
Stardust Awards	17 January 2010	New Musical Sensation – Male	Mohit Chauhan for "Yeh Dooriyaan"	Nominated	

== Legacy ==
A spiritual successor on the same name was released on 14 February 2020, with Kartik Aaryan and Saif's daughter Sara Ali Khan in the lead roles. Ali, Pritam and Kamil reprised the roles as director, musician and lyricist for this film as well. Like the prequel's music, the soundtrack was also well received in contrast to the negative response for this film.
