= Param Sundari (song) =

2021 single by Shreya Ghoshal

Single by A. R. Rahman featuring Shreya Ghoshal
- Language: Hindi
- Released: 16 July 2021
- Recorded: 2020–2021
- Studio: Panchathan Record Inn and AM Studios, Chennai
- Genre: Indian folk, classical, contemporary R&B, dance music
- Length: 3:21
- Label: Sony Music India
- Composer: A. R. Rahman
- Lyricist: Amitabh Bhattacharya
- Producer: A. R. Rahman

Track listing
- 1. "Param Sundari"; 2. "Rihaayi De"; 3. "Yaane Yaane"; 4. "Hututu"; 5. "Phuljhadiyon"; 6. "Choti Si Chiraiya"; 7. "Rock A Bye Baby"

"Param Sundari" (transl. Eternal beauty) is an Indian Hindi-language song composed by A. R. Rahman, written by Amitabh Bhattacharya and sung by Shreya Ghoshal, for the soundtrack album of the 2021 film Mimi. The song was released as the lead single along with the soundtrack album on 16 July 2021. The song has over 400 million views on YouTube. The song peaked at No. 184 on the Billboard Global Excl. U.S. chart.

== Music video ==
The song was filmed at a huge set erected at Film City in Mumbai. Initially planned to be shot during March–April 2020, it was delayed eventually due to the COVID-19 pandemic. It was later shot during January 2021. Utekar, said in an interview with The Times of India, that "the song was initially planned to be shot in Rajasthan, but travelling with a big crew and cast will not be feasible, especially during the pandemic restrictions. The international cast of the film will be flying to Mumbai for the shoot as they are required for the continuity of the film." He further added that the song is important for the narrative.

For the song, Kriti Sanon, who gained 15 kilograms to play the role of a surrogate mother, had trained intensively for three months to reduce weight. The song was filmed with more than 600 dancers in the background, along with Kriti and Sai Tamhankar (who played Shama, Kriti's friend in the film). The song was choreographed by Ganesh Acharya.

== Release and reception ==
"Param Sundari" served as the lead single from the soundtrack album, was released on 16 July 2021, by Sony Music India, along with the entire soundtrack, which featured seven songs. The song and the album was released in spatial and lossless audio formats supported with Dolby Atmos on Apple Music.

Vipin Nair of Music Aloud stated Param Sundari is "A. R. Rahman nailing the “mass entertainer” formula in a way that he hasn’t done in a while". He appreciated Shreya Ghoshal's vocals, but found "equally praiseworthy is the chorus that matches her brilliantly". A review from Humming Heart said that "Param Sundari opens with a mischievous and energetic (uncredited) chorus that lends way to a brief but arresting bassline, and to the cracking vocals of Shreya Ghoshal laden with tantalizing verses. The song launches into the full item number zone and holds us hooked for its judiciously short runtime of three and a half minutes. That is Rahman delivering a trademark Bollywood hit number."

Sankhayan Ghosh of Film Companion stated "The song has a catchy hook, a good chorus, but see how Rahman and Amitabh Bhattacharya subvert the “item number”. Bhattacharya’s lyrics, sung by Shreya Ghoshal, are in a constant mode of shirking away unwanted male attention". Joginder Tuteja of Bollywood Hungama said that "The tremendous rustic sounds of the music with that base of the drum beats and the wicked modern line is what makes the song so good."

== Celebrities reaction ==
"Param Sundari" became trending in social media soon after its release and many fans did cover versions of this song. Celebrities such as Hina Khan, Raksha Gupta and a fan of Jin (BTS) performed cover versions. Actress Kangana Ranaut, took to Instagram to praise the song and appreciated Kriti Sanon's dance moves.

== Personnel ==
Credits adapted from Sony Music India

- A. R. Rahman – composer, producer, musical arrangements
- Shreya Ghoshal – playback singer
- Amitabh Bhattacharya – lyricist
- Sarthak Kalyani – additional vocals
- Suryansh – additional vocals
- Hriday Gattani – additional vocals
- Nakul Abhyankar – additional vocals, audio mixing
- Pooja Tiwari – additional vocals
- Rakshita Suresh – additional vocals
- Kutle Khan – folk voice, morsing and khartal
- Keba Jeremiah – guitar
- Sunil Miller – guitar
- Dipesh Varma – Indian percussions
- Hiral Viradia – music supervisor
- Ranjit Barot – additional arrangements and programming
- Suresh Permal – sound engineer (Panchathan Record Inn, Chennai), audio mixing, mastering (studio mastering)
- Karthik Sekaran – sound engineer (Panchathan Record Inn, Chennai)
- T. R. Krishna Chetan – sound engineer (Panchathan Record Inn, Chennai)
- S. Sivakumar – sound engineer (AM Studios, Chennai)
- Pradeep Menon – sound engineer (AM Studios, Chennai), mastering (Apple Digital Master)
- Aravind Crescendo – sound engineer (AM Studios, Chennai)
- R. Samidurai – musicians' fixer
- T. M. Faizuddin – music co-ordinator
- Abdul Haiyum Siddique – music co-ordinator

== Accolades ==
Award (Note: Awards, festivals and organizations are in alphabetical order.)	Date of ceremony (Note: Date is linked to the article about the awards held that year, wherever possible.)	Category	Recipient(s)	Result	Ref.
International Indian Film Academy Awards	3–4 June 2022	Best Female Playback Singer	Shreya Ghoshal	Nominated	
Mirchi Music Awards	19 March 2022	Best Song Producer – Programming & Arranging	A. R. Rahman	Won	
Mirchi Music Awards	19 March 2022	Female Vocalist of The Year	Shreya Ghoshal	Nominated	
Mirchi Music Awards	19 March 2022	Best Song Engineer – Recording & Mixing	Nakul Abhyankar & Suresh Permal	Nominated	
Filmfare Awards	30 August 2022	Best Music Director	A. R. Rahman	Nominated	
Filmfare Awards	30 August 2022	Best Female Playback Singer	Shreya Ghoshal	Nominated	
