= Henk Bekedam =

Dutch health professional

Dr. Henk Bekedam is a medical doctor, public health specialist and an employee at the World Health Organization (WHO). Since 27 November 2015, he works as the WHO Representative to India. In 2020, he provided expert opinion on COVID-19 prevention and control in India.

== Career ==
Dr. Henk Bekedam is a Dutch national. Bekedam, who did his M.Sc. in economics from London School of Economics in 1996. He worked in Cambodia for six years to rebuild the health system in post-Khmer Rouge period. from 1988 to 1995 he was seconded to government in Africa. In the first instance he was in Zambia at a district hospital and he worked in Malawi from 1991 to 1995, as a chief in regional health office in Malawi. He was then appointed as the WHO Representative to China from 2002 to 2007 and supported China successfully to contain the SARS outbreak in 2003. He also worked for six years as the Director of Health Sector Development in the WHO Western Pacific Region. There, he led a team that provided policy support to 37 countries. In 2013, he started serving as the WHO Representative to Egypt, where he focused on prevention of Hepatitis C, response to avian flu and maintaining polio free status. Starting November 2015, he works as the WHO Representative to India. He has expertise in strong expertise in health system strengthening, Universal Health Coverage health sector reforms, food safety, AIDS, tuberculosis, tobacco control and chronic diseases.
