= Malabar Gold & Diamonds =

Indian jewellery group

Malabar Gold and Diamonds
- Type: Private
- Industry: Jewellers
- Founded: 1993; 33 years ago
- Headquarters: Kozhikode, Kerala, India
- Number of locations: 445 showrooms (2026)
- Area served: India, United States, Canada, UAE, Singapore, Kuwait, Bahrain, Oman, Qatar, Saudi Arabia, Malaysia, United Kingdom, Australia, New Zealand
- Products: Gold, diamonds, gemstone, platinum and silver
- Revenue: ▲US$7.5 Billion
- Owner: M. P. Ahammed
- Number of employees: 27,500 (2025)
- Website: www.malabargoldanddiamonds.com

Malabar Gold & Diamonds is an Indian jewellery group headquartered in Kozhikode, Kerala. The company was founded by M. P. Ahammed in 1993. As of May 2023, it owns more than 330 showrooms across 11 countries.

== History ==
The company was established in 1993 by M. P. Ahammed, who also serves as the chairman. In 1981, he started trading spices and copra (dried kernel of coconut). At the age of 36 in the year 1993, he established Malabar Gold with a capital of ₹50 lakhs in his home town Kozhikode. Since 2000, the company has been on an expansion and was reported to be a group worth ₹500 crore in 2005.

The company expanded to the Middle East in 2008.

In 2022, with a revenue of $4.024 billion, Malabar was ranked 19th luxury goods company in Deloitte's "Global Powers of Luxury Goods" report.

As of 2026, Malabar Gold & Diamonds reported a turnover of approximately ₹63,000 crore.

== Controversies ==
=== 2016 ===
The business courted controversy in 2016 when their UAE branches celebrated Pakistan's Independence Day.

=== 2025 ===
The company had engaged London-based Pakistani influencer Alishba Khalid as one of the influencers to promote the inauguration of its Birmingham showroom. After her earlier posts criticising India and Operation Sindoor resurfaced, social media posts labelled the brand a Pakistan sympathiser. The association sparked boycott calls peaking around the Dhanteras festival. The Bombay High Court ordered the deletion of the defamatory social media posts. Malabar stated that it had hired Khalid through an agency, was unaware of her origin and remarks, and had already discontinued her services.

=== 2026 ===
Bilaspur Gold Showroom Faces Allegations of Selling 20-Carat as 22-Carat Staff at the Malabar Gold & Diamonds showroom in Bilaspur allegedly sold 20-carat jewelry as 22-carat, prompting local jewelers to confront them and videos to spread online. Tarbahar Police filed an FIR on August 15 against the manager, caratometer operator, and others after a HUID-marked bracelet tested lower multiple times. Users shared frustration over similar deceptions by chain stores and family jewelers alike, calling for independent testing and government-approved machines to rebuild trust amid high gold prices.
