= Satyamev Jayate season 1 =

The first season of Satyamev Jayate premiered from 6 May 2012 on various channels within Star Network, along with Doordarshan's DD National. It marked the television debut of Indian Bollywood actor and filmmaker Aamir Khan. While Hindi is the primary language of the show, it is also dubbed and simulcast in several other Indian languages such as Bengali, Malayalam, Marathi, Tamil, and Telugu.

== List of episodes ==
Episode	Title	Topic	Song	Original Air date
1	Daughters are precious	Female foeticide in India	"O Ri Chiraiya"	6 May 2012
2	Break the Silence	Child sexual abuse	"Haule Haule"	13 May 2012
3	Marriage or Marketplace	Dowry system in India	"Rupaiya"	20 May 2012
4	Every Life is Precious	Medical malpractice	"Naav"	27 May 2012
5	Intolerance to Love	Love marriages and Honor killings in India	"Ghar Yaad Aata Hai Mujhe"	3 June 2012
6	Persons with disabilities	Physical Disabilities	"Chanda Pe Dance"	10 June 2012
7	Danger at home	Domestic Violence	"Sakhi"	17 June 2012
8	Poison on our Plate?	Pesticide poisoning and Organic farming	"Maati Bole"	24 June 2012
9	Think before you Drink	Alcohol abuse	"Ae Zindagi"	1 July 2012
10	Dignity for All	Casteism and Untouchability	"Kabir Vani"	8 July 2012
11	Sunset Years, Sunshine Life	Old age	"Bahut Yaad Aate Ho"	15 July 2012
12	Every Drop Counts	Water crisis and Rainwater harvesting	"Jal na Jaaye Jal"	22 July 2012
13	Idea of India	We the People	"Nikal Pado"	29 July 2012

== Episode 1: Daughters are precious ==
Air Date: 6 May 2012

The show in progress during its first episode where Aamir Khan is interacting with journalists Meena Sharma and Shripal Shaktawat

The first episode focused on the issue of female foeticide in India. The show began with some stories of mothers who struggled to give birth to their girl child. The first guest on the show was Amisha Yagnik from Ahmedabad; she was forced by her husband and in-laws to abort her female unborn children six times in a span of eight years and further shared her experiences in finally giving birth to a daughter. The second guest, Parveen Khan from Morena, Madhya Pradesh, shared the story of her husband disfiguring her face by biting it when she insisted on giving birth to a female child against his wishes. Another guest, doctor Mitu Khurana from Delhi was asked by her orthopaedic surgeon husband and in-laws to abort her girl twins 20 weeks after conceiving. Her story helped dispel the perception and myth among people that the abhorrent practice of female foeticide is practised only by rural people or those living in small towns, or is limited only to less educated people.

The show claimed that, according to the 2011 Census, the rate at which unborn female children are killed amounts to killing off one million girls a year, and there were 914 girls for every 1,000 boys. The episode concluded with a song "O Ri Chiraiya" sung by Swanand Kirkire along with Ram Sampath. The title of the song translates to "O sparrow!", a bird that is slowly becoming extinct.

=== Impact ===
On the next day after the episode went on air, Rajasthan Chief Minister, Ashok Gehlot urged the public representatives and other non-governmental organisations (NGOs) to take actions to stop the illegal practice of female foeticide. An official reported that Gehlot also reviewed existing efforts taken by the government against the practice. He also directed the officials to prepare a plan for a special campaign against female foeticide.

Khan, as promised on the show, met Gehlot over the issue of female foeticide. Gehlot accepted the request to set up fast track court to deal the case of the sting operation featured on the show, which was conducted in 2005 by Meena Sharma and Shripal Shaktawat. After discussion with Gehlot, Chief Justice of the Rajasthan High Court, Arun Kumar Mishra, gave permission to set up the fast track court. The sting operation had revealed the faces of more than 140 doctors involved in the illegal practices of prenatal sex determination tests and abortion. But no one had been punished in the case even after seven years.

On 10 May 2012, The Rajasthan Government suspended the licenses of six sonography centres and issued notices to 24 others for violating the provisions of the Pre-Conception and Pre-Natal and Diagnostic (PCPNDT) Act, 1994. However, the health minister of Rajasthan, Rajkumar Sharma, criticised the show for "sensationalising female foeticide cases". He argued that the government had already been taking action against female foetecide and did not perform a knee-jerk reaction following the show.

The first episode of the show also influenced several state governments in India. Maharashtra Health Minister, Suresh Shetty asked for Khan's support for the government's campaign against female foeticide. In a letter written to Khan, Shetty mentioned that the Maharashtra government had registered cases against 317 sonography centres in the state conducting unauthorised sex determination tests. Also, 27 doctors and four families who sought sex determination tests have been punished under the PCPNDT Act. Bollywood actor couple Ajay Devgn and Kajol became associated with the government's campaign against female foeticide. Haryana government made it compulsory to submit identification proof of the pregnant woman at ultrasonography centres as a pre-condition for undergoing the prenatal sex discernment test. Haryana government also announced a reward of ₹21,000 (US$220) to those who give information about doctors conducting sex determination tests in the state. The Government of Madhya Pradesh had suspended licences of 65 Medical termination of pregnancy (MTP) centres in the state.

== Episode 2: Break the Silence ==
Air Date: 13 May 2012

The second episode focused on child sexual abuse in India. For the episode, Khan had worked with NGOs working with children abused sexually. It highlighted two cases of people – Cindrella Prakash and Harish Iyer – who had gone through bad experiences. Cindrella was molested in her childhood by an elderly person close to her family while her parents were not in the house. Harish was sexually abused and raped for several years by a person close to his family, until one day he fought back at the age of 18. The show also focused on how the victims hesitated to tell their parents about their suffering due to fear and shame. It went on to explain how, at times, even after informing their parents, they are unable to take necessary actions due to disbelief or fears of being ridiculed by society. The chief guest was actress Sridevi, who applauded Harish's courage and determination and handed him a present for appreciation. She signed Khan's letter to the Parliament of India lending his support to the Parliament for strong child sexual abuse laws in India.

The episode included a workshop for children to create awareness about the subject amongst children and their parents. The children were told that there are three "danger zones" (private parts) on everyone's body. These include the chest, area between the legs and the bottom. The children were advised to shout and run to a safe place, and immediately inform a person whom they trust (preferably parents) in case any unwanted person tries to touch them in these areas.

=== Impact ===
Following the broadcast of the second episode, the helpline for children received an increased number of calls from all over the country, reporting child abuse (sexual abuse of children and other forms of abuse).

On 22 May 2012, the legislation to protect children below 18 years from sexual abuse became a reality with the Lok Sabha (lower house of parliament) passing the bill, which was earlier cleared by the Rajya Sabha (upper house of parliament). Child rights activists have called the bill regressive, however, and teens across the country are generally appalled that the bill increased the minimum age for sexual consent from 16 to 18.

== Episode 3: Marriage or Marketplace ==
Air Date: 20 May 2012

The third episode focused on the dowry system in India. Khan spoke with several women who had faced dowry harassment by their in-laws before and after marriage. It showcased the story of Komal Sethi from New Delhi, who was married to a software professional. Though her in-laws showcased a loving nature in the beginning of the arranged marriage talks, as the date of the wedding neared, they demanded furniture, cars, jewellery, home appliances, and cash from her family. These kind of demands continued after the wedding. After her husband got a job opportunity in the United States, she was forced to ask for money from her parents so that her husband could buy the travel tickets to the US and get a car there. Once in the US, her husband tortured her (by not respecting her, by not letting her to eat enough, and strangulating her repeatedly) in order to get money for furniture and cars in the US: even though they had already been given those things in India, and her husband was earning $65,000 per year. He also pressured her to get the legal rights to her house in India. Upon her consistent refusal, he left her without food and water, confining her in their apartment for four days before she was rescued by a women's care helpline. Her parents commented at the end of Komal's story that they should have refused the initial demands and broken off the arrangement rather than suffering later and ultimately breaking the marriage.

The second story highlighted on the show was of Nishana, who was then pursuing her PhD from American College, Madurai. A big family from the city had approached her family for their girl's hand in marriage. After the marriage, her in-laws demanded a car, although her family had given a considerable amount of gold and cash in dowry. Even after agreeing to their demand of car, and the demands of a forced plastic surgery for Nishana, the critical comments did not stop. When she could not take it any more, Nishana committed suicide.

The second guest on the show was Paramjeet Kaur Moom, from Karimpur, Punjab, and her marriage was also an arranged marriage. After marriage, her husband demanded money from her to go abroad for studies. Despite having financial difficulties at the time, her family took a loan of ₹800,000 and provided for him. After being abandoned in India just after a week of their marriage, although he had earlier promised to take her abroad with him, her in-laws started abusing her physically and verbally and demanding more money. After 3 years of marriage in 2012, despite her father having provided in excess of ₹1,500,000, she was forced out of her home. At the time of airing, she was being forced to agree to divorce. In the show, Parneet Singh, Regional Passport Officer of Jalandhar, Punjab was also present and voiced a way for her to take action against the husband. The story of Paramjeet was shown to be part of a more general problem in Punjab of Non-Resident Indian (NRI) marriages (where one spouse lives in India and the other lives abroad).

The episode showcased several additional stories from both urban and rural areas where the women had to face similar abuse and demands, some of which had ended with divorce or lawsuits which are still pending judgement. The show also highlighted that many people from lower income brackets take loans from the bank for their daughters' marriage expenses.

To curb these types of incidents, representatives of some communities present in the audience outlined some steps taken by them. Their main point was to avoid too much fanfare, typical of Indian marriages, so that there is no pressure on the poor to arrange weddings like the rich do.

The episode also showcased the story of Rani Tripathi from Mumbai, who fought back by recording the dowry demands by the groom's parents with a hidden camera. Once she informed the media about the tape, it was showcased in major TV channels across India. Her efforts and courage was appreciated by Khan.

The show was concluded by audience opinions and the episode song "Rupaiyya" composed by Ram Sampath and performed by Sona Mohapatra.

== Episode 4: Every Life is Precious ==
Air Date: 27 May 2012

The fourth episode of the show threw light on the frail health care system prevalent in the country. The show started with the story of VS Venkatesh who went through four surgeries to cure an infection in his leg. He later learnt that the entire process that had cost him ₹200,000 (US$2,100) was unnecessary, and the infection could have been treated with medicines. Next, Arvind Kumar from Hyderabad shared that he was hospitalised in an intensive-care unit (ICU) for three days and later advised to undergo a surgery, when all he needed was a dose of oral rehydration salt.

The episode showcased the tragic tale of Major Pankaj Rai's wife Seema, who was suffering from a kidney ailment and lost her life when the doctors forcibly operated on her for a kidney and pancreas transplant without her family's consent. While the surgery cost Rai ₹825,000 (US$8,800) and the loss of his wife, the doctors were not bothered to inform the family about her demise and switched off their mobile phones. Dr. Anil Pichad from Mumbai who owns a pathology lab revealed that he used to overcharge patients for tests, as he had to pay commission to the doctors; however, after he went through a personal tragedy, he stopped bribing the doctors and charges only nominal fees. Several women from Kowdipally village in Andhra Pradesh were forced to undergo operations to get their uterus removed. The farmers sold their lands or took loans to meet the high costs of these operations which were not needed at all.

The show also shed light on a number of similar medical cases, where patients suffering from minor ailments were recommended to undergo surgeries as a way of extracting more money from them. Khan spoke to Dr. KK Talwar, Chairman, Board of Governors, Medical Council of India (MCI), a statutory body regulating medical colleges, affiliation, new colleges, and doctors' registration, to understand their actions to tackle such frauds. Dr. Talwar promised Khan and the people of the country to take actions against such corrupt doctors. Khan read out the statistics of doctors in England whose licenses were permanently cancelled in the past 3 years, but in comparison, according to the Right to Information Act filed by Khan and his team, not a single doctor's licence had been cancelled in the recent past in India: thus letting the corrupt doctors evade repercussions. Khan also spoke to retired Major General Som Jhingon, ex-chairman of MCI, who had resigned from his post, as he was completely disillusioned by the way the organisation was functioning.

Khan, with the help of Dr. Shamit Sharma from Rajasthan, enlightened viewers by informing them about generic medicines that are available at an affordable cost and are in no way inferior to the branded medicines produced by celebrated pharmaceutical companies. The show also spoke about Dr. Devi Prasad Shetty and his noble low-cost health insurance scheme that allows poor people to get medical treatment at affordable rates. Veteran Dr. Gulati also urged the government to prioritise health schemes, so that even the poor could lead a healthy life.

The show ended up with a song "Naav" composed and sung by Ram Sampath, with lyrics written by Suresh Bhatia.

=== Aftermath ===
Highly upset with Aamir on the issues raised in episode 4, the Indian Medical Association (IMA) demanded an apology from Aamir Khan and warned him of legal action if he did not do so. However, Aamir declined to apologise.

The Rajya Sabha Parliamentary standing committee on Commerce later invited Aamir Khan for an interaction on the issue of medical malpractice, along with his team, to share the knowledge they had gained while researching the episode, and to give his views on Foreign Direct Investment (FDI) in the pharmaceutical sector. On 21 June 2012, Khan appeared before the Parliamentary panel examining FDI in the pharmaceuticals sector and pitched for generic medicines, saying companies will continue to make profit if they sell cheap drugs to the poor.

The Government of Karnataka, upon release of the episode, announced the opening of "Janatha Bazaar Generic Drug Store", a chain of medical stores, so as to sell generic drugs at subsidised rates, almost 50% less than the maximum retail price (MRP). According to the sources, the stores will sell both generic and branded medicines authorised by the US Food and Drug Administration, surgical equipment, and orthopaedic implants at 50% of the MRP. The government also plans to make it mandatory for all government doctors to prescribe only generic drugs. Previously, the Government of Maharashtra had announced plans to take steps to make generic medicines available in all government hospitals of the state and to set up government-aided medical stores across the state. The Government of Chhattisgarh cracked down on nine private doctors and suspended their registration for allegedly advising and removing the uterus and both ovaries without any convincing medical reasons.

The nephrologist involved in the court case about the death of Seema Rai (which was referred to as a case of medical negligence by Major Pankaj Rai in the episode), Dr. Rajanna Sreedhara, stated that his legal counsel and Fortis Hospital, where he worked, were preparing to send a legal notice to Khan and the show producers for libel. He accused Khan of failing to do proper research and accused retired Army Major Pankaj Rai of falsely accusing him of causing his wife's death through medical negligence. Sreedhara appealed on IBN Live and social networking forums for a chance to tell his side of the story. He claimed that Rai was harassing him for the past two years for a crime he had not committed and that the show had ruined his reputation as a respected physician. On reading Sreedhara's transcript defending himself, Rai wrote an open letter to IBN Live and provided several supporting medical and legal documents. He stated that the doctor had not presented the facts correctly and that he was "fighting a lone legal battle with limited resources against a mighty corporation."

== Episode 5: Intolerance to Love ==
Air Date: 3 June 2012

The fifth episode focused on the unacceptability of love marriage in Indian culture, and also threw the limelight on honour killing in the country. The episode highlighted some real-life examples where a couple married against their families' wishes and had to leave their loved ones, along with some examples of honour killing. The first case saw a couple, Lokendra and Fehmida from Uttar Pradesh, who have been struggling to save their life from the latter's family, despite a protection order from court, which is proving them helpless.

The next case was of a 27-year-old from Kolkata, Rizwanur Rahman, who lost his life in an attempt to marry a Hindu girl Priyanka Todi, the daughter of industrialist Ashok Todi. The episode then showcased the story of the Manoj–Babli honour killing case from Haryana, both of whom were killed for their love marriage. Manoj's mother and sister have been threatened a number of times to coerce them to withdraw the complaint. Aamir then had an interaction with Khap Panchayat, a religious caste-based council having no judicial powers. The panchayat claimed Manoj and Babli's marriage to be immoral, however acknowleding that they didn't deserve to be killed.

Sanjay Sachdev, Chairman of Love Commandos, from New Delhi was invited as a guest for the episode. His committee follows the motto, "Love shall conquer the world", and thus helps couples by giving them basic necessities and legal help. The last story was of Alka and Uday, both doctors by profession. Alka's parents refrained for a long time from accepting their daughter's marriage due to the fear of social stigma. Her parents finally realised that their daughter's happiness weighed more than social stigma and accepted the marriage. The show ended with a song "Ghar Yaad Aata Hai Mujhe" sung by Sona Mohapatra and Ram Sampath.

=== Aftermath ===
Haryana's khap panchayats, known for their bizarre diktats, have now demanded that Aamir Khan's TV show, Satyamev Jayate, be pulled off air. Aamir drew the ire of the kangaroo courts after he accused them of triggering honour killings.

== Episode 6: Persons with disabilities ==
Air Date: 10 June 2012

The sixth episode focused on the social problems faced by those with disabilities. In the show, Aamir highlighted the hardships faced by the disabled, who even today continue to struggle for their basic rights. The episode highlighted the fact that people with disabilities are no different from regular people when it comes to the zeal and appreciation for life, and that India has to decide whether it wants the crores (tens of millions) of people with disabilities to stay at home or to be a part of the mainstream and contribute to the economy.

Circumstances led Dr. Rajendra Johar to be confined to bed, and he was declared disabled. However, he turned the notion of disability on its head and from his bed has helped countless people with disability to gain education, employment, and self-respect. Dr. Johar is the founder of the NGO Family of Disabled.

Shreya Chaturvedi is 11 and exudes an enviable zest for life. Pratibha Chaturvedi is Shreya's mother and her best friend: "She calls me 'dost'", giggled the girl, who is affected by cerebral palsy but wants to lighten the burden on her mother's life, "Sometimes she gets so tired and I press her feet".

Another person with disability is Sai Prasad, who demonstrates similar enthusiasm and has taken flight, literally. Sai Prasad found the country's infrastructural disability to be more challenging than his own. He saw a world of difference in the facilities for the disabled in the US compared to the facilities in India. Software engineer Krishnakant Mane writes poetry in his spare time and climbs real mountains, as well as the virtual ones created by a disabled-unfriendly world.

The song of the show, "Chanda", was performed by disabled people.

== Episode 7: Danger at home ==
Air Date: 17 June 2012

The seventh episode deals with the issue of domestic violence. This episode had a majority of male audience and began with Aamir Khan asking the audience on their view about unsafe place for women. There were many views regarding this, but all the views from the audience pointed to public places. Khan contradicted this by first showing his findings about the patient statistics in a hospital in Bandra, Mumbai.

The show then proceeded with interviews with women affected by domestic violence.

In this episode, Khan had promised Shanno, a cab driver who was a victim of domestic violence, that he would hire her vehicle whenever he visited Delhi next. When the actor arrived in the capital for two days (to present his research on medical malpractices in Parliament), he hired a cab from Sakha, the agency that Shanno works with.

== Episode 8: Poison on our Plate? ==
Air Date: 24 June 2012

The show highlighted the adverse effects of pesticides on people's health and the environment. Examples were given of toxic chemicals entering the human food chain through spraying of chemicals by farmers. It also demonstrated new farming techniques that do not support spraying of any chemicals such as pesticides and fungicides. Organic farming techniques and the success story of a farmer were also shown.

The show was started with a brief on a small research project that was carried out by a doctor on how dangerously high dose of chemicals found in pesticides are entering infants through breast feeding mothers.

Then, a small documentary was shown on how some villages in Kasaragod, state of Kerala, were affected by repeated unscientific spraying of pesticides using helicopters, during a continuous period of 25 years between 1976 and 2000. Then, a doctor who served the same village described the plight of the people, on how they fought and ended this practice. He gave evidence that the mortality rate during pregnancy had decreased significantly as a result of not using pesticides.

The show then discussed alternatives for pesticide-free farming. Aamir Khan talked to Sikkim's Chief Minister, Pawan Chamling, about Sikkim imposing a total ban on chemical pesticides and fungicides. Sikkim is the first state in India aiming to convert all its farms to the use of organic farming practices. Another example of organic farming reform in Andhra Pradesh was also highlighted.

There was also counterpart view by an MD of a leading pesticide company, who said that the adverse use of pesticide is exaggerated.

At the end of the show, Aamir Khan had a general discussion with the audience on this topic, and the episode ended with him asking viewers to vote on their views on the government encouraging organic farming.

== Episode 9: Think before you Drink ==
Air Date: 1 July 2012

The show highlighted the issue of alcoholism in Indian society. The audience of the episode were all people who were under 30 years of age. Most of them at some point of their life had been under the influence of alcohol, with some thinking of it as a social necessity and others drinking it to celebrate an occasion.

Aamir Khan welcomes a well‑known news editor to the show. Aamir Khan notes that the news editor, successful, in the news editors career had a very different life ten years ago. The news editor shares how alcohol addiction harmed the news editors family life damaged the news editors reputation and caused the news editors financial difficulties.

The show then proceeded with inviting a psychiatrist, who explained how alcohol affects the person's life.

Another guest to the show was Javed Akhtar, who also experienced alcoholism at one point in his life: he also told the story of how he had not touched alcohol for the past 21 years.

== Episode 10: Dignity for All ==
Air Date: 8 July 2012

The show discussed the social ills of casteism and untouchability. Aamir and the guests spoke about discrimination in Indian society on the basis of caste and the kind of treatment that is meted out to people belonging to the Dalit community. Though untouchability is a criminal offence in India, and the state has, since independence, adopted affirmative action for the benefit of Scheduled Castes and Scheduled Tribes, incidents of caste-based discrimination are reported across the country on a daily basis.

The first guest to speak on the topic was Dr. Kaushal Panwar, a Sanskrit professor with Delhi University. Dr. Panwar, who belongs to the Dalit community, faced caste-based discrimination from her childhood and continues to face prejudice even today. She talked about her early childhood and her first brush with casteism when she was asked to wear a different uniform to differentiate her based on her caste. The prejudice continued throughout her childhood and did not stop even after she joined the elite Jawaharlal Nehru University. Even though Dr. Panwar became a professor in one of India's best universities, she continued to be made to feel inferior because of her caste. Despite facing hardships, Dr. Panwar was determined to challenge the existent social norms. It was her will and her father's constant encouragement that made her the person that she is now.

The show then featured Balwant Singh, a Dalit and a former bureaucrat, who resigned from the Indian Administrative Service after facing regular humiliation, even from his subordinates: highlighting how discrimination even has significant negative effects on elected members of parliament. P. L. Punia, Chairperson of the National Commission for Scheduled Castes, recollected how priests of the Kali temple in Orissa locked the sanctum sanctorum when he tried opening up the temple gates for Dalits.

The second guest on the show was documentary filmmaker Stalin K, who produced a film titled "India Untouched". He cleared the misconception that casteism is only prevalent among the Hindus and showed that it is also apparent among the Muslims, Christians, and Sikhs. Aamir showed a few clips from Stalin's documentary to show the prevalent practice of caste-based discrimination across religious lines. Stalin advocated inter-caste marriages as a possible solution to end this issue, which runs deep in the Indian psyche.

The next story to feature on the show was from Samarthpura village in Rajasthan, where a Dalit, Rampal Solanki, challenged the exclusive right of upper castes to ride a horse during wedding processions. Facing threats, Rampal approached the Station House Officer (SHO) of the nearest police station. The SHO, Manvendra Singh Chauhan, despite belonging to an upper caste himself, decided to uphold the law of the land. The wedding procession was provided police protection, and a regressive social custom was eventually broken.

The show then played host to Justice CS Dharmadhikari, a veteran freedom fighter and former judge. Born in a Brahmin family, Justice Dharmadhikari disassociated himself from the customary practices followed by his community, for which he suffered social exclusion from other members of his caste. He shared the story of an incident where his nephew's life was saved by a Dalit person's blood. He raised an important question to everyone – When the blood of a Brahmin and a Dalit is not different by virtue of their castes, why is the society hell bent on segregating people on the basis of their birth? Justice Dharmadhikari emphasised that the only way to stop caste-based discrimination is to refuse the existence of a caste system. He received a standing ovation from the audience.

The last guest on the show was Bezwada Wilson, son of a manual scavenger who took it upon himself to create awareness against this inhuman occupation and uplift people who were "traditionally" forced into the occupation. It was due to his and his team's effort that the Indian government eventually passed the "Employment of Manual Scavengers and Construction of Dry Latrines (Prohibition) Act, 1993". The implementation of this act, however, has been unsatisfactory. Wilson accused the Indian Railways of employing manual scavengers to clean up railway tracks on platforms.

The general consensus on the show was that casteism can only be eradicated if both the backward and the forward communities join hands together: but the issue needs to be acknowledged and dealt with on an urgent basis. Real development of the nation can only take place if citizens treat each other equally and do not consider any person inferior on the basis of birth.

The audience question of the episode was: "Do we wish to see an immediate end to the practice of manual scavenging, or cleaning of others' excreta by hand?"

The charity proceeds from the episode were given to the "Association for Rural and Urban Needy", a society working for the welfare of manual scavengers. The show ended with the song "Kabir Vani", Kabir's poetry rendered into lyrics by Munna Dhiman, set to music by Ram Sampath, and sung by Keerthi Sagathia.

=== Reception ===
The show did not generate as much interest as some of the earlier episodes, partially because the issue of casteism is not an unknown topic to most Indians. Some people alleged that the show generalised the entire Brahmin community of being casteist. Others felt the episode was long and the lack of intensity made for dull viewing.

== Episode 11: Sunset Years, Sunshine Life ==
This episode was telecast on 15 July 2012. The show discussed the conditions of senior citizens. Nonagenarian adventure sportsman N. K. Mahajan was amongst those interviewed on the show.

== See also ==
- Satyamev Jayate (talk show)
- Satyamev Jayate (season 2)
- Satyamev Jayate (season 3)
