= Raman Raghav 2.0 (soundtrack) =

Raman Raghav 2.0 (Original Motion Picture Soundtrack)

Soundtrack album by Ram Sampath
- Released: 3 June 2016
- Genre: Feature film soundtrack
- Length: 19:00
- Language: Hindi
- Label: T-Series
- Producer: Ram Sampath

Ram Sampath chronology
Tere Bin Laden: Dead or Alive (2015)	Raman Raghav 2.0 (Original Motion Picture Soundtrack) (2016)	Raees (2017)

Raman Raghav 2.0 (Original Motion Picture Soundtrack) is the soundtrack album to the 2016 film of the same name directed by Anurag Kashyap, starring Nawazuddin Siddiqui, Vicky Kaushal and Sobhita Dhulipala. The film is scored by Ram Sampath, whose soundtrack featured five songs with lyrics written by Varun Grover. The album was released by T-Series on 3 June 2016.

== Background ==
The film's soundtrack and background score was composed by Ram Sampath, while the lyrics were penned by Varun Grover. Sona Mohapatra, Nayantara Bhatkal, Siddharth Basrur and Ram Sampath provided vocals for the album's songs. The film's music was released on 3 June 2016 at a launch event held at a private restaurant in the suburbs of Mumbai. Sampath described the song "Qatl-e-aam" as a "unique blend of Ghazal & Hard Trance". On composing the tune for the particular song, Sampath added "The song has come up from a particular situation in the film, which describes the developing chemistry between the two lead characters. Ram had read the whole script and we discussed sound and the double entendre required for it. Then he came up with Qatl-e-Aam, and Varun completed the lyrics thereafter." His inspiration from the score derived from the works of Vishal Bhardwaj, particularly Maqbool (2004) and Haider (2014), which were "very cohesive and work wonders in the film".

== Reception ==
The film's soundtrack received a mixed response from critics. Swetha Ramakrishnan of Firstpost wrote "The Raman Raghav 2.0 soundtrack doesn't shy away from baring its soul to you, the listener. It dazzles you, captures your attention, and it seduces you into entering a world of grey where it's okay to make music about the darkest societal elements. You carry the guilt along with you, just as each of these singers carry it in their vocals. It's a sinister soundtrack, fitting for a film like Raman Raghav 2.0." Tatsam Mukherjee of India Today said that "the soundtrack is impressive and deserves our attention [...] Ram Sampath brings his Coke Studio form to this film after a long time (his last major release being Talaash) and the sound doesn't seem like it cares about catering to the standard Bollywood audience."

Writing for Rediff.com, Aelina Kapoor described the soundtrack as "unconventional score that matches the filmmaker's unorthodox reputation". In his review for Scroll.in, Manish Gaekwad reviewed that "the frenzied soundtrack seems to score when tied to the film's narrative. It is unlikely to have the same luck independently." Mohar Basu of The Times of India called it as "an album worth celebrating simply for its inventiveness [...] even if it isn't quintessentially saleable, this one is for those who have a taste for edgy music. Karthik Srinivasan of Milliblog wrote "Ram Sampath's music has been consistently inventive and Raman Raghav delivers on that promise too".

Suprateek Chatterjee of HuffPost wrote "Ram Sampath's background score, which isn't bad in itself, is used adequately in certain places and horribly in others". A reviewer from Indo-Asian News Service described the score to be "frenzied and adrenaline-packed", while Rohit Bhatnagar of Deccan Chronicle wrote "Music by Ram Sampath is 'trippy' especially 'Behooda' song which goes well with the flow of the story."

== Track listing ==
All lyrics are written by Varun Grover; all music is composed by Ram Sampath

Raman Raghav 2.0 (Original Motion Picture Soundtrack) track listing
No.	Title	Singer(s)	Length
1.	"Qatl-E-Aam"	Sona Mohapatra	4:05
2.	"Behooda"	Nayantara Bhatkal	3:10
3.	"Paani Ka Raasta"	Siddharth Basrur	4:01
4.	"Raghav Theme"	Instrumental	4:50
5.	"Qatl-E-Aam" (Unplugged)	Sona Mohapatra	3:49
Total length:			19:00
