= Jumbo (2008 film) =

2008 film by Kompin Kemgumnird

- Theatrical release poster
- Directed by: Kompin Kemgumnird
- Written by: Evan Spiliotopoulos; Aummaraporn Phandintong; Amit Babber (Hindi Dialogue)
- Based on: Khan Kluay by Kompin Kemgumnird
- Produced by: Percept Picture Company
- Starring: Akshay Kumar; Rajpal Yadav; Lara Dutta; Asrani; Gulshan Grover
- Narrated by: Akshay Kumar
- Music by: Ram Sampath
- Production company: Percept Picture Company
- Distributed by: Shemaroo Entertainment
- Release date: 25 December 2008 (India)
- Running time: 89 minutes
- Country: India
- Language: Hindi
- Budget: ₹32 crore (US$3.3 million)
- Box office: ₹21 crore (US$2.2 million)

Jumbo is a 2008 Indian animated adventure film directed by Kompin Kemgumnird, produced by Percept Picture Company and features the voices of Akshay Kumar, Lara Dutta, Dimple Kapadia, Rajpal Yadav, Asrani, and Gulshan Grover. Jayveer Singh, aka Jumbo, is a little elephant who tries to find his father, and the journey of finding his father made him a war elephant. The film is a Hindi remake and Hindi dubbed version of the 2006 Thai film Khan Kluay, which is based on "Chao Praya Prab Hongsawadee" by Ariya Jintapanichkarn.

The film was dubbed and released in Hindi where the creative direction on the film was done by Mayur Puri.

Jumbo was released worldwide on Christmas Day 2008, but performed poorly at the box office, grossing ₹21 crore (US$2.2 million). Kumar was reportedly paid ₹13 crore (US$1.3 million) for the dubbing and two promotional songs.

In 2011, a direct-to-DVD sequel titled Jumbo 2: The Return of the Big Elephant was released.

== Plot ==
The film starts with actor Akshay Kumar singing the song "Everything's Gonna Be All Right," which is shown by him to a kid in a movie theater. The kid asks him why he is saying "everything's gonna be alright." Akshay then narrates the story of Jumbo from his childhood.

The story starts with Devi naming her son Jayveer Singh, aka Jumbo, in a jungle in the Shakti Nagar kingdom on the border of India and China. The other members of the herd ask who thought of this name, and in parallel, there is a battle between Shauryagarh and Shakti Nagar, where Jumbo's father, Yudhveer Singh, is currently fighting.

His mother never reveals any details of his father, and neither do the rest of the elephants in the herd. He is a happy-go-lucky elephant who loves to play with the other animals in the jungle. Occasionally he would be confronted by the other elephants of the herd, who would bully him on the history of his father. Tired of being teased about his father's cowardice in some war, he confronts his mom again, who somehow manages to rubbish the topic.

One night he learns that an army of Shauryagarh has entered the jungle, and they plan an overnight stay. In the hope of finding his father, Jumbo sets out to the camp and manages to find a tent that houses the royal elephant of that army, aka Bakhtavar Singh. He goes in and politely asks Bakhtavar if he has heard about Yudhveer. Suddenly, he becomes violent, and Jumbo starts running for cover. In the meantime, the soldiers standing outside see Jumbo running out of the tent and try to capture him.

Jumbo manages to go into the tent of prince Vikramaditya. Vikramaditya then saves Jumbo from the soldiers. It is then revealed that Vikramaditya is the captured prince of Shakti Nagar. Vikramaditya calms Jumbo down by simply placing a hand on his head and assuring him nothing is going to happen to him. The army chief, aka Senapati, comes to ask if Jumbo is in his tent, which he denies. When he returns to his tent, he sees that Jumbo has fled the scene.

After running away from the camp, Jumbo realises that he is separated from his mother and is lost in the jungle. He wanders in the jungle for a while, where he meets Sonia, a cute pink elephant. She takes him to her village and makes him meet a wise old Mahout who is the guardian of Sonia. He sees that Jumbo is badly wounded and tends to him. One day, Shauryagarh soldiers come to the village for grains and food. During this commotion, Jumbo, who is now all well, sneaks off into the woods. Sonia sees this and follows him. While searching for Jumbo, she is attacked by animals, and Jumbo saves her, injuring himself again. The Mahout is very impressed by Jumbo's bravery. Jumbo, still in search of his father, tries to talk to Dildar Yadav. Dilbar reveals that Yudhveer was the King's warrior elephant and says that he must be in the palace only.

Jumbo excited wants to go to the palace, but it's shown that only warrior elephants can go in the palace. So he joins the Mahout's elephant troop, who are training to be warriors for the competition to become a royal elephant. Jumbo, who is weak at first, gains a lot of strength and grows up to become a very strong elephant who overpowers all the other elephants. Now all grown up, Jumbo and Sonia, who is shown to be Jumbo's girlfriend, are enjoying their alone time during a village festival. The Shauryagarh soldiers are still fending off the village. But this time Jumbo fights off everyone and defeats the soldiers.

The next day, the Mahout and his elephants, including Jumbo, are leaving for the Shakti Nagar's royal elephant warrior competition. Jumbo is selected for the final round and is initially winning, but his mother is also present in the competition as a spectator and screams his name. The soldiers hold her down, and this is seen by Jumbo, and he fights off the soldiers. The King is intrigued by Jumbo and walks up to him and clams him down just like Vikramaditya did when Jumbo was a child. The King is revealed to be Vikramaditya himself, all grown up. He announces that Jumbo is his new royal warrior elephant.

At night, Jumbo's mother finally tells him the story of his father and how he never returned after a war. They sneak into a tent that houses the ex-royal elephants, hoping to locate Jumbo's father. There they meet an old royal elephant who knows Jumbo's father. He then narrates what happened in the battle. He tells them that Jumbo's father was killed by Bakhtavar after a fierce battle.

Jumbo then set out with King Vikramaditya to avenge the death of his father. Jumbo shows the same strength and skill that his father possessed in his days. They challenge Bakhtavar for a one-on-one combat. Then follows a fierce battle between Jumbo and Bakhtavar, in which Jumbo kills Bakhtavar in the same manner that his father was killed. In the end, Akshay again emphasises his words, "Everything's gonna be all right when we walk side by side."

== Voice cast ==
- Akshay Kumar as Jayveer Singh "Jumbo" the elephant/Himself (narrator)
  - Ashar Shaikh as Baby Jayveer Singh "Jumbo"
- Lara Dutta as Sonia
  - Vaishnavi Shetty as Baby Sonia
- Rajpal Yadav as Dildar Yadav
- Dimple Kapadia as Devi, Jumbo's mother
- Amar Babaria as Rajkumar Vikramaditya
- Asrani as Senapati
- Gulshan Grover as Bakhtavar Singh
- Hemant Rao as The Kid

== Music ==
The soundtrack was composed and directed by Ram Sampath. The lyrics were penned by Israr Ansari, Munna Dhiman, Asif Ali Beg. The album was released by T-Series.

=== Track listing ===
No.	Song	Singers
1	"Everything's Gonna Be Alright"	Kunal Ganjawala
2	"Chayee Madhoshiyan"	Sona Mohapatra, Sonu Nigam
3	"Dil Mera Jumbo"	Joi Barua
4	"Badhte Chalo"	Sukhwinder Singh
5	"Jaya He"	Krishna Beura
6	"Chayee Madhoshiyan" (Remix)	Sona Mohapatra, Sonu Nigam

== Release ==
Jumbo had a limited release in 500 screens, due to most of the screen space taken by Rab Ne Bana Di Jodi and Ghajini.

== Reception ==
=== Box office ===
The film opened to a poor response, grossing ₹6 crore (US$620,000) in its opening week. Within three weeks the film had grossed ₹21 crore (US$2.2 million).

=== Critical response ===
Taran Adarsh from Bollywood Hungama rated it 3/5 and said "JUMBO is a sweet, sincere and simple film that works. Who knows, it may spring a surprise this Christmas. Recommended for kids from 6 to 60". Gaurav Malani of Economic Times gave it 2/5 saying "Whether you are an Akshay Kumar aficionado or an animation genre fan, Jumbo won't appeal much to either. This time the animation format is enhanced but the storytelling is obsolete". Khaled Mohamed from Hindustan Times gave it 1.5 out 5 and said "Forget comparisons with the Disney classics Bambi or Fantasia, or the more recent Finding Nemo and Madagascars. With round-the-clock exposure to the best animation in the world, you doubt even if pre-tweens will be enthralled by the caricatured animal life and the flat palette colours".

== Sequel ==
The sequel Jumbo 2: The Return of the Big Elephant was released on 21 October 2011. It received negative reviews
