= Dekh Le =

- Directed by: Ketan Rana
- Cinematography: Aakash Raj
- Distributed by: Whistling Woods International
- Release date: 16 December 2013
- Running time: 0:01:36

Dekh Le is a viral video dealing with the subject of men ogling women in India. It was produced by film studies students at Mumbai-based Whistling Woods International Institute of Film, Fashion & Media and released on 16 December 2013, the first anniversary of the 2012 Delhi gang rape. It garnered one million hits in its first week on YouTube.

== Background ==
On 16 December 2012, a horrific gang-rape of an Indian girl took place in a moving bus in New Delhi, the national capital of India. The event was followed by various protests in which masses took to the streets in various Indian states, demanding the government to form stricter laws regarding women's public safety. The media industry voiced its concern in its own way. One such way was the women-empowerment ad campaign 'Dekh Le', launched one year after the incident.

== Content ==
The 90 second video shows four different scenarios where women are made to feel uneasy and uncomfortable by male gaze in everyday life situations. It shows women at a red light, in a bus, on a train and at a cafe, being subjected to leering male eyes. In order to retaliate, these women show mirrors to the men; on seeing how bad they look while staring at a girl, realize their mistake and are forced to take their eyes off. The video concludes with the four empowered women going about their business, free from prying eyes.

Vignettes
Victim-turned-empowered woman	Offender(s)	Offense	Demonstration of empowerment	Reflective device of shame
Twentysomething woman on a motorbike stopped at a traffic signal	Two twentysomething men on a motorbike who pull up alongside	Leering at the woman's thigh exposed by her shorts	Condescending sneer turns to an angry scowl followed by a quick exit	Helmet visor which reflects the men's confusion
College-aged woman napping on a bus alongside a female companion	Three college-aged men standing in the aisle of the bus	One man calls the attention of the other two to the napping woman's cleavage; one leans in for a look and they all smile knowingly	Pendant falls when the bus jostles the woman, obscuring her cleavage	Reflective pendant which reflects the instigator's self-consciousness
College-aged woman having a discussion with several friends at a cafe	Orange juice-drinking twentysomething man one table over	Staring at the woman's lower-back tattoo	Slinging her handbag over her back, covering the tattoo	Cosmetics mirror attached to the exterior of the handbag which startles the man from his staring
Thirtysomething woman sitting on a train, clad in a headscarf	Thirtysomething man in the seat across from her, snacking	Admiring the woman's face as she wipes the sweat from her brow	Look of embarrassed disbelief followed by the donning of sunglasses	Sunglasses which reflect the man frantically looking about to see who has noticed his transgression

== Song ==
The jingle was sung by Sona Mohapatra and composed by Indian composer Ram Sampath. The hook line "Dekh Le Tu Dekhta Hua Kaisa Dikhta Hai" translates as "Look how you look while you are looking at me."

== Reception ==
The advert received a lot of media coverage, both on online news websites and blogs, as well as in physical newspapers and magazines. Rheana Murray from New York Daily News described the video: "Video from Indian arts group shows leering men what they look like." Deepa Kunapuli from Upworthy wrote "It's meant to start a conversation about what empowerment for women looks like." Emma Cueto from Bustle writes, "The video is great, both in its very realistic – and uncomfortable – portrayal of men staring at young women, and also in the message it is trying to send. Hopefully it has a big impact, and not just in India." Aditi Shome Ray from DNA described the ad: "This ad on women empowerment will make men cast their eyes down in shame." IBNLive described the ad as " The commercial sends out a strong message to show how ridiculous men look like while ogling at women." As of 8 December 2018, the video stands at more than 6.1 million views on YouTube and has also hit the theatre screens of India.
