= Khan Kluay =

- Theatrical release poster
- Directed by: Kompin Kemgumnird
- Written by: Evan Spiliotopoulos; Aummaraporn Phandintong
- Based on: Chao Praya Prab Hongsawadee by Ariya Jintapanichkarn
- Produced by: Aummaraporn Phandintong
- Starring: Anyarit Pitakkul; Nawarat Techarathanaprasert; Phoori Hiranyapruk; Warattaya Nilkuha; Pongsak Hiranyapruk; Nanthana Bunlong; Suthep Po-ngam; Channarong Khuntee-tao; Klos Utthaseri; Juree Ohsiri; Koti Aramboy
- Cinematography: Aummaraporn Phandintong
- Edited by: Evan Spiliotopoulos
- Music by: Chatchai Pongprapaphan
- Production companies: Kantana Animation; Kantana Group Public Co. Sahamongkol Film International
- Distributed by: Sahamongkol Film International
- Release date: 18 May 2006
- Running time: 95 minutes 79 minutes (English dub)
- Country: Thailand
- Language: Thai
- Budget: ฿115 million
- Box office: ฿196.7 million

Khan Kluay (Thai: ก้านกล้วย; RTGS: Kan Kluai) is a 2006 Thai animated adventure film set in Ayutthaya-era Siam about a Thai elephant who wanders away from his mother and becomes the war elephant for King Naresuan. It is based on the story Chao Phraya Prap Hongsawadee by Ariya Jintapanichkarn. The film took three years to make, and was released on May 18, 2006, in Thailand. In 2007, the film was released as The Blue Elephant in the United States on September 2, and as Jumbo in India in December 25.

Khan Kluay is directed by Kompin Kemgumnird, an animator who had worked on Disney films such as Atlantis: The Lost Empire and Tarzan and Blue Sky Studios' Ice Age. Produced by Kantana Animation, it was the first Thai 3D animated feature film and the first Thai animated feature film released since The Adventure of Sudsakorn, a 1979 cel-animated film by Payut Ngaokrachang. The film's sequel, Khan Kluay 2, is about Khan Kluay's two elephant children, another attack by the Hanthawaddy, and the choice between living with his wife or fighting the Burmese. An animated television series, The Adventures of Khan Kluay, was produced by Kantana Animation Studio and broadcast on BBTV Channel 7.

== Plot ==
In the 1500s, an elephant named Saeng Da gave birth to a calf, whom she names Khan Kluay. Phupa, Khan Kluay's father, is a war elephant of the Ayutthaya army. As a young calf, Khan Kluay befriends a columbidae named Jitrit. As the two roam around the jungle, Khan Kluay meets Chaba Kaew, a pink elephant who lived with humans since her birth.

That night, Khan Kluay tells Saeng Da about Phupa, and he, along with Jitrit, sets off the look for him, but he gets in trouble, and he encounters Nguang Deang, the elephant of the Hanthawaddy army who killed Phupa. The evil elephant pushed the calf out of his palace, which led Jitrit to prophesize that Khan Kluay that he will become the war elephant to fight Nguang Deang's army.

Khan Kluay suddenly gets into deadly situations and grows up. As the Ayutthaya army prepares to take over, Khan Kluay and Jitrit find themselves held captive in the logs, where the former saves his mother. However, Mingyi Swa, Nguang Deang's human companion, destroys the army and take over Ayutthaya. Meanwhile, Khan Kluay befriends King Naresuan, who agreed to help him.

Later, Nguang Deang and his army arrive, and begin their attack. Naresuan leads the army to attack. As the Ayutthaya army battled the Hanthawaddy army, Nguang Deang fights Khan Kluay attracting Mingyi Swa and Naresuan to a sword duel. A ember sets the battlefield on fire and, in a final duel, Naresuan defeats Mingyi Swa and he dies along with Nguang Deang. The battle won, and Khan Kluay is crowned as a royal elephant. He lives with Chaba Kaew, and everything changed as a life.

== Voice cast ==
- Puri Hiranprueck as Khan Kluay, a brave and determined blue elephant who rises from a wild calf to become the royal war elephant of King Naresuan.
  - Anyarit Pitakkul as young Khan Kluay
- Warattaya Nilkuha as Chaba Kaew, a spirited and kind-hearted pink elephant who becomes Khan Kluay's close friend and love interest.
  - Nawarat Techarathanaprasert as young Chaba Kaew
- Pongsuk Hiranprueck as Jid Rid, a fast-talking, energetic pigeon who serves as Khan Kluay's loyal sidekick and comic relief.
- Nantana Boonlong as Saeng Da, Khan Kluay's protective and loving mother who tries to keep him safe from the dangers of the human world.
- Juree Osiri as Pang Nuan, Khan Suthe's wise grandmother, representing the deep history and tradition of their herd.
- Suthep Po-ngam as the Mahout, a skilled elephant trainer who recognizes Khan Kluay's potential and helps guide his development.
- Rong Kaomulkadee as Sing Khon, a veteran elephant who provides guidance and support during the heat of battle.
- Ekachai Pongsamai as Nguang Dang, a formidable and murderous Burmese elephant who challenges Khan Kluay's strength.
- Channarong Khuntee-tao as Hanthawaddy Lieutenant
- Vasan Padthong as Hanthawaddy Sheriff
- Sumet Ong-art as Naresuan, the heroic king of the Ayutthaya Kingdom who leads his people in the fight for independence, riding Khan Kluay into the famous battle.
- Klot Atthaseri as Mingyi Swa, the viceroy of Burma who faces King Naresuan in elephant-back combat.

== Voice cast ==
- Anyarit Pitakkul as Khan Kluay (young)
- Nawarat Techarathanaprasert as Chaba Kaew (child)
- Phoori Hiranyapruk as older Khan Kluay
- Warattaya Nilkuha (Jui) as older Chaba Kaew
- Pongsak Hiranyapruk as Jitrit, a pigeon
- Nanthana Bunlong as Saeng-daa
- Suthep Po-ngam as Mahout
- Channarong Khuntee-tao as Burmese general
- Klos Utthaseri as Mingyi Swa
- Juree Ohsiri
- Koti Aramboy

=== US English dub ===
- Thomas Starkley as Khan Kluay (young)
- Jeremy Redleaf as Khan Kluay (old)
- Miranda Cosgrove as Kon Suay
- Martin Short as Jai
- Amy Carlson as Nuan, Cha, Cow
- Carl Reiner as Tian
- Kate Simses as Sang Da
- Troy Baker as Marong, Young Prince Naresuan, Minchit Sra
- Richard Epcar as King Narusean, Ajan, Officer
- Cindy Robinson as Matriarch Elephant, Dela

=== Hindi voice actors ===
- Akshay Kumar as Jayveer "Jumbo" the elephant/Himself (narrator)
  - Ashar Shaikh as Baby Jayveer "Jumbo"
- Lara Dutta as Sonia
  - Vaishnavi Shetty as Baby Sonia
- Rajpal Yadav as Dildar Yadav
- Dimple Kapadia as Devi
- Amar Babaria as Rajkumar Vikramaditya
- Asrani as Senapati
- Gulshan Grover as Bakhtavar

== Production ==
Khan Kluay was directed by Kompin Kemgumnird, an animator who had worked on the Disney films The Lion King, Atlantis: The Lost Empire and Tarzan, and Blue Sky Studios' Ice Age. Produced by Kantana Animation, it was the first Thai 3-D animated feature film and the first animated Thai feature since Payut Ngaokrachang's cel-animated The Adventure of Sudsakorn (1979). Khan Kluay took three years to produce.

== Releases ==
Khan Kluay was released in Thailand on May 18, 2006, and the film was shown to an audience of Asian elephants and their mahouts in an outdoor screening in Ayutthaya Province on June 6 of that year. It was released in September 2008 on DVD in the United States as The Blue Elephant. The Indian production Percept Picture Company bought the rights to the film and released a Hindi-language version, Jumbo, on December 25, 2008; Indian actor Akshay Kumar voiced the main character, Jumbo.

=== United States ===
The film was released in the US on September 2, 2008, by The Weinstein Company and The Jim Henson Company as The Blue Elephant. Like other foreign animated films which have been dubbed into English (such as My Neighbor Totoro and Kiki's Delivery Service), it was released direct-to-video. The film was re-dubbed with celebrity voices, including Martin Short, Miranda Cosgrove and Carl Reiner. Some scenes were deleted for the US version, and character names were changed.

=== India ===
The film released in India on December 25, 2008, as Jumbo by Percept Picture Company. It was re-dubbed with a cast which included Akshay Kumar and Rajpal Yadav.

== Festivals and awards ==
- 2006 - 16th Thailand National Film Association Awards
  - Best Picture
  - Best Screenplay
  - Best Original Score
  - Best Sound
- 2006 Golden Doll Awards
  - Best score
  - Best sound recording
- 2006 Bangkok Critics Assembly
  - Best score
- 2006 Starpics Awards
  - Best score
- 2006 Star Entertainment Awards
  - Best picture
  - Best score
- 2006 Animadrid, International Animation Festival, Spain
  - Best Feature Film
- 2007 Sprockets Toronto International Film Festival for Children
- 2007 Golden Elephant International Children's Film Festival
  - Opening film

== Sequel and television series ==
A 2009 film sequel, Khan Kluay 2, was a box-office bomb.

An animated television series, The Adventures of Khan Kluay, was produced by Kantana Animation Studio and is broadcast on BBTV Channel 7 in Thailand.

Khan Kluay featured in animations broadcast in 2016 as the lead-in to Thailand Move Forward, a government-information program which all television stations in Thailand are required to broadcast at 6 pm.
