= Manoj–Babli honour killing case =

2007 honour killing and subsequent court case in India

The Manoj–Babli honour killing case was the honour killing of Indian newlyweds Manoj Banwala and Babli in June 2007 and the subsequent court case which historically convicted defendants for an honour killing. The accused in the murder included relatives of Babli (grandfather Gangaraj, who is said to have been a Khap leader, brother, maternal and paternal uncles and two cousins). Relatives of Manoj, especially his mother, defended the relationship.

The killing was ordered by a khap panchayat (khap), a religious caste-based council among Jats, in their Karora village in Kaithal district, Haryana. The khap passed a decree prohibiting marriage against societal norms. Such caste-based councils are common in the inner regions of several Indian states, including Haryana, Punjab, western Uttar Pradesh and parts of Rajasthan, and have been operating with government approval for years. In any event, the state government expressed no concern about the ruling of the khap panchayat.

Among Jats the marriage within the same gotra is restricted and such marriage is considered invalid.The Khap panchayat's ruling was that Manoj and Babli belonged to the Banwala gotra, a Jat community, and were therefore considered to be siblings ( brother–sister relationship) and any union between them would be invalid and incestuous. Nevertheless, the couple went ahead with their marriage, following which they were abducted and killed by Babli's relatives.

Lal Bahadur Khowal the lawyer representing Manoj's family said that "The police was refusing to arrest the criminal, Ganga Raj. News reports pointed out how Panchayats around Haryana were being held in his favour and how khaps were issuing warnings against his arrest. A senior police officer made a statement in court saying that Ganga Raj can’t be arrested because his arrest could create a law and order situation. He said this in court! I was shocked to see a lawful authority unwilling to arrest an alleged criminal citing law and order."

Lal Bahadur Khowal expressed satisfaction with the court's decision, stating that the superintendent of police has been directed to take appropriate action against the negligent police officials. He praised the verdict, believing it will send a powerful message and restore the common man's trust in the judiciary. he said, adding, “Lighter punishment would have been a mockery of justice.”

In March 2010, a Karnal district court sentenced the five perpetrators to death, the first time an Indian court had done so in an honour killing case. The khap head who ordered but did not take part in the killings received a life sentence, and the driver involved in the abduction a seven-year prison term. According to Home Minister P. Chidambaram, the UPA-led central government was to propose an amendment to the Indian Penal Code (IPC) in response to the deaths of Manoj and Babli, making honour killings a "distinct offense".

== Background ==
Manoj's and Babli's families lived in Karora Village, Kaithal. Manoj's mother, Chanderpati Berwal, had four children, of whom Manoj was the eldest. Chanderpati was widowed at the age of 37, when Manoj was only 9. Manoj owned an electronics repair shop at Kaithal and was the only member of his family earning a livelihood. Manoj's cousin, Narender, lived with the family and worked in Panchkula.

Babli's mother, Ompati, also had four children, including eldest son, Suresh. Like Manoj, Suresh was the only bread winner of the family. Babli was still studying in school. Ompati is a widow. (Note: Conflicting reports exist as to when Ompati's husband died. According to the judge of the case, Vani Gopal Sharma, her husband died two years before the murder. According to a quote from Ompati, her husband died of trauma after the murder. The Tribune reported that Ompati's husband had died when her "children were very young".)

== Development of the relationship and subsequent marriage ==
Manoj and Babli after their marriage in Chandigarh in April 2007

In 2005, Manoj and Babli began to show interest in each other. Manoj was four years older than Babli. All residents of Karora village belong to the same clan, Banwala, a Jat community, and marrying within the clan is considered incest. Chanderpati recalled, "We knew about Babli long before they decided to marry each other. She would call up often and I would sermonise to her about staying away from Manoj, fearing the fallout of such an alliance. They were, however, unconcerned and chatted for hours together. If I did walk into the room while they were talking, Manoj would quickly disconnect the phone and run off to avoid any questioning." She continued, "I even went to Babli's house and told her mother that Manoj and Babli were seeing each other. I asked her to dissuade Babli or quickly marry her off before word of their dalliance spread."

On 5 April 2007, says Chanderpati, " The following morning, Babli's uncle came by to speak with Manoj. According to Chanderpati, "He said he had come to recover some money that Manoj had borrowed. I told him that Manoj was away for an exam. He accepted a cup of tea and left. We only discovered late in the evening that Babli, too, was missing and the two had run away." Instead of sleeping in the shop and studying in the night for his exam the next day, Manoj had eloped with Babli to Chandigarh on the night of 5th April 2007. Two days later, on 7 April at a Durga temple in Chandigarh, Manoj "married" Babli in an informal (and legally invalid) ceremony simply by applying vermilion to the parting of Babli's hair.

Furious with the marriage and fornication, Babli's family asked for intervention from the local khap panchayat, which annulled the so-called marriage. The khap also announced a social boycott on Manoj's family. Anyone who kept ties with them would be fined Rs. 25,000. Ompati claims to have tried to persuade her family that Babli did nothing dishonourable, and that she and Manoj would move back home soon.

== Court appearance ==
The court gave them protection but Manoj called us one day to say that Babli's relatives had been chasing them and that the policemen entrusted with protecting them had left them alone, so they were leaving for Delhi. He said his cellphone had run out of balance and that we should call him. But when we called him after about an hour, his phone was switched off and there was no communication with them after that.

— Chanderpati

On 26 April, Babli's family filed a First Information Report (FIR) against Manoj and his family for kidnapping Babli. On 15 June, Manoj went to court with Babli, testifying that they had married in conformity with the law and that he did not kidnap Babli. The judge ordered police protection for the two. Chandrapati did not attend the trial so that Babli's family would not be aware that Manoj and Babli were in town.

After the trial, Manoj and Babli, accompanied by a team of five police officers assigned to them for protection, left for Chandigarh. The police left them at Pipli and slipped away. Suspecting foul play, Manoj and Babli did not continue toward Chandigarh, instead boarding a bus for Karnal. According to a statement filed by Chanderpati, later that day, around 3:40 pm, she received a call from a Pipli telephone booth from Manoj, who said that the police had deserted them, and Babli's family members were trailing them, so they would try to take a bus to Delhi and call her back later. Babli asked for acceptance from Chanderpati, who replied affirmatively. That was the last time Manoj's family heard from the couple.

On 20 June, Chanderpati's complaint regarding the kidnapping was filed as an FIR at the Bhutana police station following media pressure on the police.

== Kidnapping and murder ==
The couple's bus left for Delhi, but en route at 4:30 pm, Babli's relatives stopped the bus near Raipur Jatan village, about 20 kilometres (12 mi) from Pipli. They kidnapped the couple in a Scorpio SUV driven by Mandeep Singh. Kuldip Thekedar, a road contractor, witnessed the kidnapping and filed a complaint at the Butana police station in Karnal district, giving the licence plate number of the Scorpio.

Later, Chanderpati ascribed the murder to the unauthorised withdrawal of the couple's security team ignoring the orders given by the district and sessions judge (DSJ) of Kaithal. Upon receiving no further news, Chanderpati's nephew, Narendra Singh traced the contractor, and after he was shown a photo of the couple, the contractor recognised the couple. The family then understood that Manoj and Babli were the victims of the kidnapping.

After the kidnapping, the couple were beaten. Babli's brother Suresh forced her to consume pesticide, while four other family members pushed Manoj to the ground, her uncle Rajinder pulling a noose around Manoj's neck and strangling him in front of Babli. They wrapped the bodies in gunny sacks and dumped them in Barwala Link Canal in Hisar district. On 23 June, nine days later, their mutilated bodies, hands and feet tied, were fished out of the canal by Kheri Chowki police. After autopsy, police preserved Manoj's shirt and Babli's anklet and cremated the bodies as unclaimed on 24 June. On 1 July the family identified them by the remnants of their clothing. The accused were subsequently arrested.

Police discovered a number of articles in the Scorpio used to kidnap the couple—parts of Babli's anklet, two buttons from Manoj's shirt, and torn photographs of the couple. Manoj's purse was found on one of the accused.

== Court judgement ==
As no Karnal lawyer would take up the case, Manoj's family had to find lawyers from Hisar. Advocate Lal Bahadur Khowal, Cornel Omparkash, and Rakesh Manjhu from Hisar, Haryana accepted the case. Later on Adv. Sunil Rana from Karnal also accepted the case, arguing on their behalf public prosecutor Sunil Rana and Lal Bahadur Khowal argued that the couples' clothes recovered from the canal and photographs from the Scorpio established that day's happenings. Lal Bahadur Khowal also cited the contractor's statement and the last phone call from Manoj, in which Manoj had related that Babli's relatives were trailing them. However, the contractor "turned hostile" and withdrew his statement.

Arguing for the defence was lawyer Jagmal Singh. He asserted that there was no evidence against the accused and that it was all contrived by the media, no evidence that the khap panchayat ever met to discuss the fate of the couple, and no evidence indicating that Manoj and Babli were dead. The cremated bodies recovered from the canal were never confirmed to be those of Manoj and Babli.

On 29 March 2010, after 33 months of 50 hearings (Note: Reports differed as to the number of hearings. Some said 50, while others said 76.) with 41 witnesses, the Karnal District court found the accused guilty of murder, kidnapping, conspiracy, and destroying evidence under respective sections in the IPC. (Note: Sections 302, 364, 120B, and 21.) The next day, 30 March, for the first time in Haryana state history, a death penalty verdict was announced in the double murder case for the five accused. All were related to Babli, and included her brother Suresh, cousins Gurdev and Satish, paternal uncle Rajender, and maternal uncle Baru Ram. The leader of the khap panchayat Ganga Raj (52), was given a life sentence for conspiracy, while the driver, Mandeep Singh, held guilty of kidnapping, was given a jail term of seven years. The court asked the Haryana government to provide a compensation of Rs. 100,000 to Chanderpati, who had filed the case. Ganga Raj was fined Rs. 16,000, and the other six convicts Rs. 6,000 each.

The court also accused six police personnel of dereliction of duty and directed the SSP of Kaithal to take action against them. The personnel included head constable Jayender Singh, sub-inspector Jagbir Singh, and the members of the escort party provided to the couple. They claimed that the couple wanted them to leave. The SSP's statement was that "[i]t is correct that the deceased couple had given in writing not to take police security any further, but Jagbir Singh was well aware that there was a threat to their lives from the relatives of the girl." The report stated that Jayender informed Gurdev Singh of the location of the police and that of Manoj and Babli over his mobile phone. Jayender was dismissed from the police force, and both he and Jagbir were penalised by a cut of two increments.

In her verdict, district judge Vani Gopal Sharma stated, "This court has gone through sleepless nights and tried to put itself in the shoes of the offenders and think as to what might have prompted them to take such a step." "Khap panchayats have functioned contrary to the constitution, ridiculed it and have become a law unto themselves."

Khowal was satisfied with the decision, "Out of seven accused, five have been given death sentences. This will send a strong message to the public that law is greater than the khap." However, he was disappointed that "the leader [Ganga Raj] got away with death penalty because he intentionally disappeared during the killing." Narendra said, "We will appeal in High Court for death penalty to the main accused, Ganga Raj. We respect the court's decision but he should be punished so that the instigators of the crime get the punishment. Also it is important that it is a very clear message so that no khap gives such directions, ever." Seema seconded Narendra's concerns, "We would have been happier if the main accused was also given the death sentence. The decision of the panchayat was not justified and people should not to be allowed to misuse their power. We have fought this battle alone when no one was supporting us." She requested more security for her family, "They tried to bribe us to withdraw the case then they threatened that they would kill us if we didn't withdraw the FIR. Even after the decision we're afraid of a backlash from the Khap Panchayat."

== Aftermath ==
=== Historical significance ===
The case was the first resulting in the conviction of khap panchayats and the first capital punishment verdict in an honour killing case in India. The Indian media and legal experts hailed it as a "landmark judgement", a victory over these infamous assemblies, which acted for years with impunity as parallel judicial bodies. Also, few honour killing cases went to court, and this was the first case in which the groom's family in an honour killing filed the case. In a statement to the press, former Home Minister Chidambaram slammed the khap panchayats, asking tersely, "Who are these khap panchayats? Who gave them the right to kill in the name of honour?"

Surat Singh, director of the Haryana Institute of Rural Development, Nilokheri, anticipated that the verdict will end the diktats of khap panchayats. The khaps had never worried before because their "political bosses refrained people from acting against them. With this verdict, those who try to impose a medieval order on society will think twice". Political analyst Ranbir Singh agreed that the judgement will "act as a deterrent". Additional Advocate General Arun Walia hailed the decision: "before passing ruthless judgments, the members will surely take note of this decision".

The honour killing inspired Ajay Sinha to produce a film titled Khap—A Story of Honour Killing starring Om Puri, Yuvika Chaudhary, Govind Namdeo, Anuradha Patel, and Mohnish Behl, to raise awareness about the khap's diktats. It will cost ₨25–30 million and was expected to enter theatres by late July 2010. Sinha claimed that the film is based on not one distinct killing but many. He considered the film "a protest against such traditions and practice". For research, Sinha had visited Haryana and spoken to khap members.

=== Chanderpati ===
Days after the verdict, a The Times of India headline hailed Chanderpati, who struggled years for justice, as "Mother Courage" for having done "what even top politicians and bureaucrats have shied away from doing—taken on the dreaded khap panchayats." Chanderpati now lives with her two daughters and remaining son under the protection of two policemen. She withdrew her daughter Rekha from public school and sent Vinod to a school in another district. Chanderpati also reported threats from villagers, "The villagers have threatened to eliminate us. I am enemy number one and my son is a culprit. We've been told our ordeal can end if we withdraw the police case but we refused. So, the nightmare continues."

Chanderpati has stated she intends to continue until Ganga Raj is sentenced to death: "Our fight has not ended here. We will not rest till he [Ganga Raj] also gets the death penalty." The khap panchayats remain defiant even after the verdict. "The verdict has done justice to my son's death, but it has not changed the way the village works," Chanderpati said. "I am fighting but my son died only because the girl's male relatives could kill their own sister. Families allow themselves to be instigated. As long as men can kill their own daughters, what change will there be?"

=== Vani Gopal Sharma ===
Judge Vani Gopal Sharma has supposedly been receiving threats since her verdict in the case. The High Court had directed adequate security to be provided to her, but later she again informed the High Court of the failure to increase security. She sought transfer to Panchkula, a city near Chandigarh. She requested this shortly after her verdict was denounced vehemently by the khap panchayats. The police chief of Karnal district, Rakesh Kumar Arya, claimed that Sharma did not complain about inadequate security. "There is no truth in reports that Karnal's Additional District Sessions Judge wants to move out of the district on account of inadequate security," he said. "I don't know whether any such request was made, but it looks unlikely."

=== Khap protests ===
A maha khap panchayat (grand caste council) representing 20 (Note: There were different reports of the number of khap panchayats comprising the maha khap panchayat. Some sources reported 20, while others recorded 36, and one even said 200.) khap panchayats of Haryana, Uttar Pradesh, and Rajasthan held a meeting on 13 April 2010, in Kurukshetra to challenge the court verdict and support those sentenced to death in the case. They planned to raise money for the families of the convicts to hire top lawyers for the appeal. Each family in Haryana that was part of a khap panchayat was to contribute ₨10. They also demanded that the Hindu Marriage Act be amended to ban same-gotra marriages.

The khaps threatened to boycott any MP and assembly member from Haryana who did not back the khaps request. They also blocked the Kurukshetra-Kaithal highway in protest.

Dissatisfied with the decision at the April meeting, the maha khap panchayat called another meeting on 23 May in Jind to discuss their plans.

=== Developments in honour killing law ===
The vilest crimes are committed in the name of defending the honour of the family or women and we should hang our heads in shame when such incidents take place in India in the 21st century.

— P. Chidambaram, in response to a calling attention notice in the Rajya Sabha

After the court judgement, state authorities began to take on the khap panchayats, and consequently, many village sarpanches (village heads) supporting these councils were suspended. Top Jat leader and former minister Shamsher Singh Surjewala said, "The diktats and fatwas issued by so-called gotra khaps on breaking of marriages and other similar issues would lead to 'Talibanisation' of society as such decisions were illegal and against the constitution."

On 5 August 2010, in a Parliament session, Chidambaram proposed a bill that included "public stripping of women and externment of young couples from villages and any 'act which is humiliating will be punished with severity'" in the definition of honour killing and that would "make khap-dictated honour killings a distinct offence so that all those who participate in the decision are liable to attract the death sentence". He insinuated that the proposed law would place the "onus of proof on the accused". A July 2010 The Times of India article anticipated that the bill would not pass in the monsoon session of Parliament in the same year.

== Appeal in High Court ==
Following the verdict, the accused appealed to the Punjab and Haryana High Court. Ganga Raj's appeal for parole was declined. On 13 May 2010, the court admitted the appeal of him and the other six convicts challenging the court's verdict.

On 11 March 2011, the Punjab and Haryana High Court commuted the death sentence awarded to four convicts – Babli's brother Suresh, uncles Rajender and Baru Ram and Gurdev in the Manoj–Babli honour killing case to life imprisonment. Ganga Raj, said to be the prime conspirator, and another convict Satish were acquitted. In an interview to NewsClick, Manoj's relatives – Seema and Chanderpati affirmed that they would challenge Ganga Raj's and Satish's acquittal in the Supreme Court. The Punjab and Haryana High Court also directed the state Government of Haryana to pay a compensation of Rs 600,000 to Manoj's mother Chanderpati.

== In popular culture ==
The 3 June 2012, episode, Intolerance to Love of TV series, Satyamev Jayate, hosted by actor Aamir Khan, featured an interview with Manoj's sister Seema and mother Chandrapati Banwala. The episode discussed this incident along with other cases in the episode.

In August 2013, senior journalist Chander Suta Dogra, published a book, Manoj and Babli: A Hate Story (Penguin) based on the honour killing case.

In 2015, a Bollywood Hindi film Guddu Rangeela used Manoj–Babli honour killing case in its storyline. Also in 2015, the Bollywood film NH10 was released to critical and public acclaim with a story-line loosely based on this case.

== Bibliography ==
- Chander Suta Dogra (2013). Manoj and Babli: A Hate Story. Penguin Books Limited. ISBN 978-81-8475-702-6.
