= N. K. Mahajan =

N. K. Mahajan (1919 – 8 November 2016) was an Indian adventure sportsman. In 2008 he became India's oldest parasailor at the age of 88. He had set this record twice before in 2003 and 2007. He was also called as Abasaheb. A veteran trekker, he has an entry in the Limca book of records for crossing the valley between the Duke's Nose and the Duchess Pinnacle in five minutes by using rock climbing techniques. The length crossed is approximately 46 m and depth 152 m. On 15 July 2012 he appeared on the TV reality show Satyamev Jayate. He was also a scout and associated with scout moment from Pune district.

== Biography ==
Mahajan was schooled at Pune's New English School, Ramanbaug. He secured the Secondary Teacher Certificate while working for Dr. E. N. Nagarwala school. He retired as principal of the school. He has been president of Maharashtra Hockey Association. The Pune City Scouts and Guides Association describes him as a distinguished scout.

Mahajan was a vegetarian. His diet included varan bhaat, pithla bhakri, green vegetables, fruits, milk and lemon juice. He trained by walking 10 km every day which he did at a speed of about 6 km/h.

He died on 8 November 2016 at the age of 97 at his residence in Pune, surrounded by family.
