= Don't Be Shy (film) =

2026 Indian Hindi-language film

- Official release poster
- Directed by: Sreeti Mukerji
- Written by: Sreeti Mukerji; Sehaj Kaur Maini
- Produced by: Alia Bhatt; Shaheen Bhatt; Vikesh Bhutani; Grishma Shah
- Starring: Aarushi Bajaj; Ansh Duggal; Bianca Arora; Piyush Khati
- Cinematography: Pratham Mehta
- Edited by: Dipika Kalra
- Music by: Ram Sampath
- Production companies: Eternal Sunshine Productions; Chalkboard Entertainment
- Distributed by: Amazon Prime Video
- Release date: 25 September 2026
- Country: India
- Language: Hindi

Don't Be Shy is a 2026 Indian Hindi-language coming-of-age romantic comedy film written and directed by Sreeti Mukerji in her directorial debut. The film is produced by Alia Bhatt and Shaheen Bhatt under their banner Eternal Sunshine Productions. The film stars Aarushi Bajaj, Ansh Duggal, Bianca Arora and Piyush Khati in the lead roles, with Kunaal Roy Kapur, Anurag Basu, Neha Dhupia and Anju Alva Naik in supporting roles. Principal photography for the film took place in Mumbai. The film premiered globally on Amazon Prime Video on 25 September 2026.

== Plot ==
Shyamili "Shy" Das is a 20-year-old college student from a middle-class family in Mumbai. Her parents, Joy and Jaya, run a struggling saree shop in Girgaum. Embarrassed by her family's financial circumstances, Shy tells her college friends that her parents live in London and own a boutique. She is in a relationship with Mayank Jhunjhunwalla, the wealthy heir to the Jhunjhunwalla Group of Companies, and has planned her future around marrying him and eventually becoming the chief executive of his family's business. Her childhood friend and neighbour, Dhruv Kumar, knows about her family and the false image she maintains at college.

On Mayank's 21st birthday, Shy expects him to continue with the future they have discussed. However, Mayank tells her that he does not want to join his family's business and instead wants to pursue a career as a singer. Shy becomes upset because his decision conflicts with the future she has planned for herself. Mayank subsequently ends their relationship. Following the breakup, Shy becomes determined to get revenge on Mayank. Her situation becomes more complicated when Mayank begins a relationship with Tara Verma, a college acquaintance of Shy. Initially, Shy regards Tara as a rival and attempts to undermine their relationship. However, as Shy and Tara spend more time together, they gradually develop a friendship. Tara also helps Shy reconsider her views about relationships and social status.

Meanwhile, Shy's friendship with Dhruv becomes increasingly important. Unlike her college friends, Dhruv knows about her family and accepts her despite the persona she has created. As events unfold, Shy's lies about her family's background are exposed, forcing her to confront the consequences of trying to maintain a wealthy and successful image. Shy eventually begins to question the future she had planned around Mayank and his family's wealth. She realizes that her ambitions had become closely tied to his social position rather than her own aspirations. When Mayank attempts to reconcile with her, Shy rejects the relationship and chooses not to return to the future she had previously imagined. The film concludes with Shy moving forward with a greater acceptance of her family and herself, while her relationship with Dhruv remains open-ended.

== Cast ==
- Aarushi Bajaj as Shyamili "Shy" Das
- Ansh Duggal as Dhruv
- Bianca Arora as Tara
- Piyush Khati as Mayank
- Kunaal Roy Kapur as Mr. Q
- Anurag Basu as Joy Das, Shy's Father
- Neha Dhupia as Nandini Verma
- Mahesh Thakur as Mr. Kumar
- Ami Trivedi as Tinaz
- Anju Alva Naik as Jaya Das
- Alia Bhatt in a cameo appearance in promotional song "Re Bawri"

== Production ==
Bhatt at the Don’t Be Shy Fest in Mumbai

=== Development ===
The film was written and directed by Sreeti Mukerji, marking her directorial debut. Sehaj Kaur Maini is also credited as a writer. The film is produced by Alia Bhatt and Shaheen Bhatt through Eternal Sunshine Productions. Grishma Shah and Vikesh Bhutani serve as co-producers. The production marks Eternal Sunshine Productions' move into a young-adult romantic comedy, following its previous projects including Darlings, Jigra and Poacher. The film introduces four newcomers in its leading roles: Aarushi Bajaj, Ansh Duggal, Bianca Arora and Piyush Khati.

== Music ==
Don't Be Shy

Soundtrack album by Ram Sampath
- Released: 3 September 2026
- Genre: Feature film soundtrack
- Language: Hindi
- Label: T-Series
- Producer: Ram Sampath

The film score and soundtrack of Don't Be Shy were composed by Ram Sampath.

The soundtrack was released by T-Series, with "Jhoomo" released as the first single on 3 September 2026, followed by "Tere Sang" on 8 September and "Re Bawri" on 17 September.

"Jhoomo" is sung by Saahel and Jonita Gandhi, while "Tere Sang" is performed by Armaan Malik and Yaashasvii Ddasane. Both songs were composed by Ram Sampath, with lyrics by Sampath and Devansh Vaidya. "Re Bawri" is sung by Sona Mohapatra, composed, arranged and produced by Ram Sampath, with lyrics by Saveri Verma; Alia Bhatt features in its music video.

Track listing
No.	Title	Singer(s)	Length
1.	"Jhoomo"	Saahel, Jonita Gandhi
2.	"Tere Sang"	Armaan Malik, Yaashasvii Ddasane
3.	"Re Bawri"	Sona Mohapatra

== Release ==
Don't Be Shy is scheduled to premiere exclusively on Prime Video on 25 September 2026. The film is being released directly through streaming rather than receiving a conventional theatrical release.

== Reception ==
On the review aggregator website Rotten Tomatoes, 33% of 12 critics' reviews are positive, with an average rating of 5.4/10.
