= Love Commandos =

Indian non-profit organization

- Formation: July 2010
- Legal status: Non-profit organization
- Purpose: Protecting lovers in India, and preventing honor-killings and suicides
- Location: Offices in Delhi, other cities in India
- Region served: India
- Website: lovecommandos.org

Love Commandos is a voluntary non-profit organization in India which helps and protects couples in love from harassment and honor killing. They provide housing, legal aid, and protection to couples seeking their aid who are being persecuted by family and society for wanting to marry based solely on mutual attraction and love.

== Overview ==
In India, most marriages are arranged by parents, with potential marriage partners vetted on the basis of caste, complexion, horoscope, etc.,—the matter of love is rarely considered. Falling in love carries a strong social stigma in India. Love across the barriers of caste, religion and economic class can be problematic, resulting in violence and occasionally honor killing. The police have been known to refuse protection to such couples, sometimes even siding with parents and arresting the male lovers on false charges of rape.

The Love Commandos consists of journalists, businessmen, lawyers and human rights activists. They provide protection to lovers from religious hardliners. They also run secret shelters for eloped couples, where they may stay until they gain financial independence. They also help willing couples to get married and register their marriage with the civil authorities.

The group was originally called the Peace Commandos, who worked to protect lovers from religious extremist groups during occasions like Valentine's Day. Later, they decided to rename the group, and concentrate on protecting lovers and on the issue of honor killing. In 2010, Love Commando was formed after a man was arrested on statutory rape charges. Even though the woman went on record that she was an adult and the relationship was consensual, the police decided to attest the father's statement that she was a minor.

Harsh Malhotra, a travel agent, founded the group. He was assaulted himself when he went to his future wife's family and later they had to elope. He is now an interior designer and the chief coordinator of the group. Sanjay Sachdeva is one of the co-founders and now runs the organization as its chairman.

The organization completed its 500 days of formation in November 2011. At that time it had more than six lakh (6,00,000) members across India and received an average of 300 calls everyday on its 24-hours helpline 09313550006 and 09313784375 WhatsApp 09311050004. In June 2012, they had seven shelters across India. That month, their cost of operations in the Delhi unit alone was about US$5,000 per month.

Sachdeva was interviewed on the 5th episode of Aamir Khan's television show Satyamev Jayate. After his appearance on the show, the organization began getting more calls than before. However, Hakim Abdul, who appeared in the same episode with his wife, was murdered five months later in November 2012 in Bulandshahr village in western Uttar Pradesh. The Love Commandos continued to protect his widow and infant daughter.

In April 2014, Björn Borg launched the website Unitethelovers.com to collect funds for the organisation. In the same year, photographer Max Pinckers featured Love Commandos and eloped couples in his photobook, Will They Sing Like Raindrops or Leave Me Thirsty. The book won the Photographic Museum of Humanity grant.

In 2014, a girl, whose father was a liquor baron in Agra, eloped with a man and sought shelter with the Love Commandos in nearby New Delhi. The girl's father used his influence to ask Agra police to search for the girl. Agra police allegedly managed to find the girl's location in a suburban area in New Delhi by using her cellphone signal. They began combing area while being armed. Delhi police had to intervene and stop the search.

UK based film maker Miriam Lyons directed film "The Love Commandos" on their work is on Google Plus, I Tunes, Microsoft and other social platforms. Special Screening of Miriam Lyons directed film 'The Love Commandos' was held at the Sardar Vallabhbhai Patel National Police Academy, Hyderabad on 24 March 2017, for Indian Police Service probationers, which is a landmark for the Non Profit Organisation.

In January 2019, Sanjoy Sachdev was arrested for confining people and extorting money from them.

== In fiction ==
The organization was featured in Tarquin Hall's fourth book starring the fictional private investigator Vish Puri, The Case of the Love Commandos.

== See also ==
- Caste system in India
- Eve teasing
- Honor killing
- Love marriage
