= Sona Mohapatra =

Indian singer

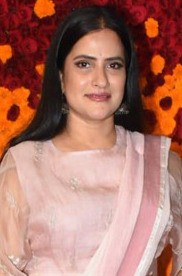
- Mohapatra in 2023
- Occupations: Singer, Music Composer, Songwriter, Producer
- Spouse: Ram Sampath (m. 2005)

Sona Mohapatra is an Indian singer, music composer and lyricist. In addition to her own material, Mohapatra has recorded remixes of songs by David Bowie, with "Let's Dance", and INXS, with "Afterglow", with the latter proving particularly successful.

== Background ==
Sona is from Odisha, born in an Odia family. She did B.Tech. engineering graduate from the Odisha University of Technology and Research in Mechanical Engineering. She also obtained an MBA degree from Symbiosis Centre for Management & HRD, Pune in marketing and Systems.

== Career ==
Her first ventures in the music industry started with advertising. One of her most famous jingles was for Tata Salt, "Kal Ka Bharat Hai" and the campaign for Unilever's Close Up has a section of her song "Paas Aao Na," which has been recorded in several languages and aired across 13 countries for four consecutive years. In 2006, she released her debut album, Sona, on Sony BMG, which sought to explore the diverse styles of rock, rhythm and blues, Flamenco, Hindustani, Baul and Romani music. In 2009, she released the single Diljale & Paas Aao Na in the same year. She sang the song "Bedardi Raja" in the movie Delhi Belly for Aamir Khan Productions and did a cameo in it. She has also sung the theme songs "Mujhe Kya Bechega Rupaiya" and "Ghar Yaad Aata Hai Mujhe" for the TV show Satyamev Jayate.

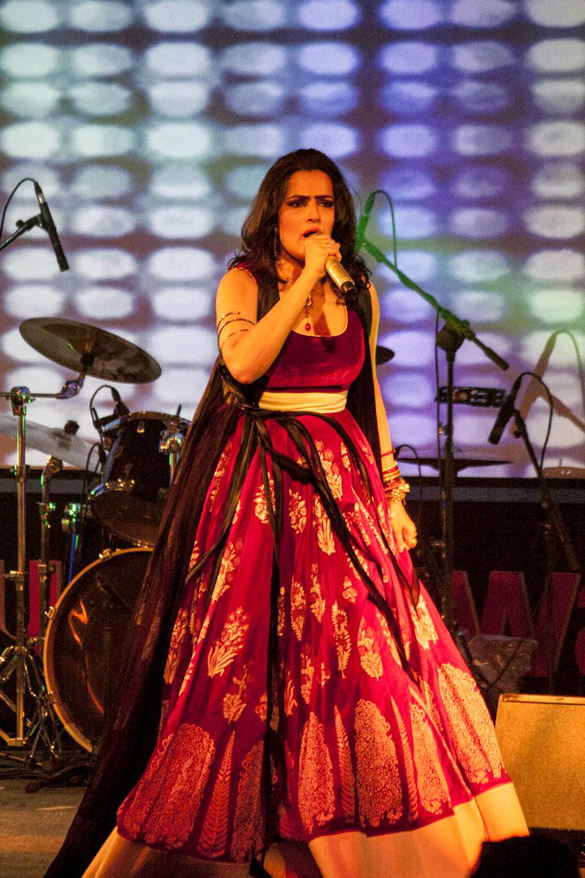
Sona Mohapatra at the Women's Empowerment's concert in New Delhi, August 2012

Sona Mohapatra came to mainstream prominence with the talk show Satyamev Jayate with Aamir Khan, in which she frequently appeared as a lead singer and performer. She was also the executive producer of the musical project on the same show. Her cameo performances recorded more than 9 million views across sites as per the latest digital count. She confessed in a 2012 interview that the project was all consuming in terms of the emotional and physical energies invested. It involved multiple lyricists, unconventional subjects, and lots of brainstorming on the songs, lyrics, shoots and recordings. To top it all, all songs were translated and recorded in multiple languages. According to Sona, "Odia influences in Bollywood are rare as yet – unlike an overdose of Punjabi, Rajasthani, Bengali and even Southern music". The song "Mujhe Kya Bechega Rupaiya," sung by Mohapatra, was composed by Ram Sampath and was aired on the third episode of Satyamev Jayate, based on celebrating women's freedom. The song has received over 26 million hits on T-Series' YouTube channel.

== Personal life ==
Mohapatra is married to Ram Sampath, a song composer and music director in Bollywood. She first met him in 2002, while she was still working as a brand manager with Marico. They were introduced by director Ram Madhvani, with whom Sampath was working for Let's Talk (2002); they married in 2005. Ram later became a household name for his innovative score of the film Delhi Belly (2011), followed by Satyamev Jayate (2012) and Talaash (2012). She is partners with Sampath in their music production house OmGrown Music and reside in Mumbai, where they also have their own studios.

== Controversies ==
In October 2018, she accused Kailash Kher and Anu Malik of sexual misconduct. In 2019, Mohapatra received a death threat after she lashed out at Salman Khan for constantly taking digs at Priyanka Chopra for leaving Bharat.

== Documentary ==
Mohapatra released a documentary film based on her life called Shut Up Sona which won multiple awards at different film festivals.

== Discography ==
=== Bollywood ===
Film	Year	Song	Composer(s)	Writer(s)	Co-singer(s)	Ref.
Family	2006	"Lori"	Ram Sampath	Sameer		
Jumbo	2008	"Chayee Madhoshiyan"	Ram Sampath	Israr Ansari	Sonu Nigam	
Jumbo	2008	"Chayee Madhoshiyan" (Remix Version)	Ram Sampath	Israr Ansari	Sonu Nigam	
Aagey Se Right	2009	"Daav Laga"	Ram Sampath	Munna Dhiman		
I Hate Luv Storys	2010	"Bahara"	Vishal–Shekhar	Kumaar	Shreya Ghoshal	
Delhi Belly	2011	"Bedardi Raja"	Ram Sampath	Akshat Verma		
Delhi Belly	2011	"Bedardi Raja" (Grind Mix Version)	Ram Sampath	Akshat Verma		
Delhi Belly	2011	"I Hate You (Like I Love You)"	Ram Sampath	Akshat Verma	Keerthi Sagathia, Shazneen Arethna	
Talaash: The Answer Lies Within	2012	"Jiya Laage Na"	Ram Sampath	Javed Akhtar	Ravindra Upadhyay	
Fukrey	2013	"Ambarsariya"	Ram Sampath	Munna Dhiman		
Bajatey Raho	2013	"Khurafati Akhiyan"	Jaidev Kumar	Kumaar		
Purani Jeans	2014	"Dil Aaj Kal" (Acoustic Version)	Ram Sampath	Prashant Ingole		
Khoobsurat	2014	"Naina"	Amal Malik	Kumaar	Armaan Malik	
Ekkees Toppon Ki Salaami	2014	"Ghoor Ghoor Ke"	Ram Sampath	Sandeep Nath		
Hunterrr	2015	"Chori Chori"	Khamosh Nath		Arijit Singh	
Raman Raghav 2.0	2016	"Qatle-E-Aam"	Ram Sampath	Varun Grover	Yash Divecha	
Global Baba	2016	"Holi Me Ude"	Angel Roman & Faizan Hussain	Shurya Upadhyay	Khesari Lal Yadav	
Saand Ki Aankh	2019	"Baby Gold"	Vishal Mishra	Raj Shekhar	Jyotica Tangri	
Taish	2020	"Re Bawree (Jahan Lost in Love)"	Govind Vasantha	Hussain Haidry		
Laapataa Ladies	2024	"Beda Paar"	Ram Sampath	Prashant Pandey		
Don't Be Shy	2026	"Re Bawri"	Ram Sampath	Saveri Verma		

=== TV ===
- Satyamev Jayate – Mujhe Kya Bechega Rupaiya, Ghar Yaad Aata Hai Mujhe, Chanda Pe Dance, and Bekhauff

=== Studio album ===
- Sona (Songs – Bolo Na, Aja Ve, Tere Ishq Nachaya, Abhi Nahin Ana)

=== Compilation ===
- Love is (2007) – Afterglow
- Teri Deewani – Ishq Nachaya
- Aao Ji – Aja Ve
- Soulful Sufi (2009) – Abhi Nahin Anaa

=== Video ===
- Dekh Le (2013)

=== Covers ===
- "Zalima" (from Raees)

=== Non-film songs ===
- "Mon Ke Bojhai" with Sahil Solanki
- "Ghane Badra"
- "Aigiri Nandini"
- "Piya Se Naina"
- "Anhad Naad"
- "Piya Se Naina" on Coke Studio Season 3
- "Rangabati" on Coke Studio (India), 2015

== Awards and nominations ==
Year	Category	Nominated Song	Film	Result	Ref
Screen Awards
2014	Best Female Playback Singer	"Ambarsariya"	Fukrey	Nominated	
Star Guild Awards
2014	Best Female Playback Singer	"Ambarsariya"	Fukrey	Nominated	
BIG Star Entertainment Awards
2013	Most Entertaining Female Singer	"Ambarsariya"	Fukrey	Nominated	
Mirchi Music Awards
2014	Female Vocalist of the Year	"Ambarsariya"	Fukrey	Nominated	
2017	Indie Pop Song of the Year	"Ankahee"	-	Nominated	
Global Indian Musical Awards (GiMA Awards)
2013	Best Female Playback Singer	"Jiya Laage Na"	Talaash: The Answer Lies Within	Nominated	
