= Tarquin Hall =

English writer and journalist (born 1969)

Tarquin Hall is an English writer and journalist. He was born in London, in 1969, to an English father and American mother. Hall has spent much of his adult life away from England, living in the United States, Pakistan, India, Kenya and Turkey, and travelling in Africa, the Middle East, and South Asia.

== News reporter ==
Hall has worked in TV news and is a former South Asia bureau chief of Associated Press TV, based in New Delhi. He has written features on Wilfred Thesiger, Texan rattlesnake hunters, the Taliban, and British-Asian Urdu poets. Hall's reports include a profile on Emma McCune, an English woman who married Southern Sudanese guerrilla commander Riek Machar; the draining of Iraq's marshes by Saddam Hussein; and a one-on-one with Abdullah Öcalan, the former leader of the Kurdistan Workers' Party (PKK), in a Syrian safe house.

== Novelist ==
He is the author of seven books and dozens of articles that have appeared in many British newspapers and magazines, including the Times, Sunday Times, Daily Telegraph, Observer and New Statesman. Hall's books have received praise in the British press, as did To the Elephant Graveyard and Salaam Brick Lane, which recounts a year spent above a Bangladeshi sweatshop on Brick Lane (in the East End of London).

In 2009, Hall published his first mystery novel The Case of the Missing Servant, introducing the fictional Punjabi character Vish Puri, India's Most Private Investigator. The second in the series, The Case of the Man Who Died Laughing, was released in June 2010. The third, The Case of the Deadly Butter Chicken, was released in July 2012. The fourth title, The Case of the Love Commandos, released in October 2013, features the real-life Love Commandos, a volunteer team of Indians who try to ease the way for marriages between Hindus of different classes. Meanwhile, Hall has self-published The Delhi Detectives Handbook, which chronicles Vish Puri's world and is written in the detective's humble-bragging voice.

== Executive roles ==
For a number of years, Hall held the office of chief executive officer (CEO) of the educational and cultural charity, The Idries Shah Foundation. With the re-publication of all of Idries Shah's books, and a streamlining of the charity's operations to ensure its long-term viability, Hall stepped-down as CEO in May 2024.

== Personal life ==
Hall lives in the UK after six years in New Delhi. He is married to the Indian-born American BBC reporter and presenter Anu Anand. They have two children.

== Works ==
- Hall, Tarquin; Amin, Mohamed (1994). Spectrum Guide to Namibia. Moorland. ISBN 978-0-86190-376-4.
- Hall, Tarquin (1996). Mercenaries, Missionaries and Misfits: Adventures of an Under-age Journalist. Muncaster. ISBN 978-0-9527412-0-6.
- Hall, Tarquin (2000). To the Elephant Graveyard. Atlantic Monthly Press. ISBN 978-0-87113-817-0.
- Hall, Tarquin (2005). Salaam Brick Lane: A Year in the New East End. John Murray. ISBN 978-0-7195-6157-3.
- Hall, Tarquin (2008). The Case of the Missing Servant:From the Files of Vish Puri, India's "Most Private Investigator". Simon & Schuster. ISBN 978-1-4165-8368-4.
- Hall, Tarquin (2010). The Case of the Man Who Died Laughing: A Vish Puri Mystery. Simon & Schuster. ISBN 978-1-4165-8369-1.
- Hall, Tarquin (2012). The Case of the Deadly Butter Chicken: From the Files of Vish Puri, India's "Most Private Investigator". Simon & Schuster. ISBN 978-1-4516-1315-5.
- Hall, Tarquin (2013). The Case of the Love Commandos. Simon & Schuster.
- Hall, Tarquin (2019). The Case of the Reincarnated Client: a Vish Puri Mystery. Severn House Publishers.
