= Rong Kaomulkadee =

Ganesh or Rong Kaomulkadee it is the stage name of Pijak Kaomulkadee. (nickname Rong; born 26 September 1947) is a senior Thai male actor, National Artist in Performing Arts (Film-Television Drama) in 2017, and a voice actor.

== Early life ==
His father Chalat Khaomulkadee, the leader of a famous Likay troupe at that time. His family originally came from Kamphaeng Phet Province but later moved to live in Thonburi, Bangkok. He followed in his father's footsteps since he was 9 years old. While he was still studying in Grade 4, he started playing radio dramas. When he was 10 years old, he made his first movie appearance in Nuea Manut (1959), playing the role of the young hero (Mitr Chaibancha). He also started acting in his first television drama, Roi Rao Nai Duang Jai, which made Samphan Phanmanee (later honored as a National Artist in Performing Arts) see his good looks and supported him to play in a drama for the Samphan Dance Troupe, which made him famous.

After that, Rong was hired to act until he became famous in TV dramas. When he graduated from Bangkok Accounting, Rong started working at Channel 4 Bang Khun Phrom. It was at Channel 4 that Jamnong Rangsikul, the head of the program department of the station at that time, saw that Rong was a funny person, so he let him try dubbing movies. Rong therefore took up a career in dubbing Thai movies, becoming the voice of the hero in almost every movie. He was the voice of many movies, both Thai and foreign movies, and was the voice of the hero for Sombat Metanee in almost every movie.

In addition, he received the Thai Language Personality and Outstanding Thai Language User Award on the occasion of the Thai Language Promotion Year in Honor of His Majesty the King on the auspicious occasion of his 80th birthday on December 5, 2007, organized by the National Culture Commission, Ministry of Culture.

== Awards ==
- 2017 – National Artist in Performing Arts (Film-Television Drama)
- 2019 – Lifetime Achievement Awards from 28th Suphannahong National Film Awards
