= Khan Kluay 2 =

2009 Thai film

- Thai theatrical release poster
- Directed by: Taweelap Srivuthivong
- Written by: Aummaraporn Phandintong; Charoonporn Parapakpralai; Doug Davidson (English dub)
- Produced by: Auchara Kijkanjanas
- Starring: Taweelap Srivuthivong; Ann Thongprasom; Attaporn Teemakorn; Nonzee Nimibutr; Varuth Waratham
- Cinematography: Phuchid Assawamahasakda
- Edited by: Thammarat Sumetsupachok; Vijjapat Kojew; Evan Spiliotopoulos (English dub)
- Music by: Chatchai Pongprapaphan
- Production companies: Kantana Animation; Kantana Group Public Co. Sahamongkol Film International
- Distributed by: Sahamongkol Film International
- Release date: March 26, 2009
- Running time: 95 minutes
- Country: Thailand
- Language: Thai

Khan Kluay 2 (Thai: ก้านกล้วย ๒; RTGS: Kan Kluai Song) is a 2009 Thai animated dark fantasy action-adventure film, directed by Taweelap Srivuthivong and released in 2009. It is the sequel to Khan Kluay and follows the further adventures of the war elephant of King Naresuan the Great. It is set during the war between Ayutthaya and Hanthawaddy. Its themes are the need to protect family and the country. In 2011, it was re dubbed into Hindi at Sound and Vision Studio as Jumbo 2: The Return of the Big Elephant and released on 21 October around Diwali in India but it received negative comments.

== Plot ==
Khan Kluay must face his greatest challenge yet, the Hanthawaddy army. He needs to protect family and country, and the choice between living with his wife or fighting the Burmese. New characters of the film are four junior elephants, and two of Khan Kluay's children, Ton Aor and Koh Kaew.

== Voice cast ==
- Taweelap Srivuthivong as Nga Nil
- Ann Thongprasom as Chaba-Kaew
- Attaporn Teemakorn as Khan Kluay
- Nonzee Nimibutr as Nanda Bayin
- Varuth Waratham as Jid Rid

== English version ==
In 2016, Grindstone Entertainment Group and Simka Entertainment produced an English dubbed version of the movie known as Elephant Kingdom, which was released on DVD via Lionsgate Home Entertainment. The first Khan Kluay film was dubbed into English by The Weinstein Company under the name The Blue Elephant. The English version of the second film lacks any ties to the first Khan Kluay film in the writing. Consequently, there are numerous changes in the English version compared to the original film and even the first Khan Kluay film. For example, all the voices in the original are replaced by new actors in the English version, with Cary Elwes replacing Jeremy Redleaf as Khan Kluay, Alexa PenaVega replacing Miranda Cosgrove as Chaba-Kaew, Garrett Clayton replacing Martin Short as Jai, while Patrick Warburton voiced Nanda Bayin. The names of the characters are also changed, Khan Kluay's name is changed to Rok, Chaba-Kaew's name is changed to Melody, and Jai's name is changed to Wingman.
