= Satyamev Jayate (talk show) =

Indian talk show

- Genre: Talk show
- Created by: Aamir Khan
- Directed by: Satyajit Bhatkal
- Presented by: Bharti Airtel
- Starring: Aamir Khan
- Opening theme: Satyamev Jayate
- Country of origin: India
- Original language: Hindi
- No. of seasons: 3
- No. of episodes: 25 (list of episodes)

Production
- Producers: Aamir Khan; Kiran Rao
- Cinematography: Baba Azmi (Studio), Shanti Bhushan Roy (Outdoor), Shibu Prusty (Associate DOP)
- Camera setup: Multi-camera
- Running time: 60–90 minutes
- Production company: Aamir Khan Productions

Original release
- Network: Star Network Doordarshan Network
- Release: 6 May 2012 – 9 November 2014

Satyamev Jayate (transl. Truth Alone Triumphs) is an Indian Hindi-language television talk show aired on various channels within Star Network along with Doordarshan's DD National. The first season of the show premiered on 6 May 2012 and marked the television debut of popular Bollywood actor and filmmaker Aamir Khan. The second season of the show was aired from 2 March 2014 and the third season started from 5 October 2014.

The show focuses on sensitive social issues prevalent in India such as female foeticide, child sexual abuse, rape, honour killings, domestic violence, untouchability, discrimination, acceptance of alternative sexualities, toxic masculinity, alcoholism, and the criminalization of politics. It aims to bring the great achievements of people which often go unnoticed in order to encourage the audience to achieve their goals no matter what comes in between. It also aims to empower citizens with information about their country, and urge them to take action. While the primary language of the show is Hindi, it is simulcast in eight languages such as Bengali, Malayalam, Marathi, Tamil and Telugu, and subtitled in English, to ensure maximum reach.

The first season of Satyamev Jayate garnered over a billion digital impressions from 165 countries, with responses from viewers in many countries, mainly Asian and African countries, including India, China, Djibouti, Seychelles, Sierra Leone, Isle of Man, and Papua New Guinea. A sum of ₹22.3 crore (equivalent to ₹46 crore or US$4.9 million in 2026) was received as donations by the NGOs featured on this season. The second season was watched by 600 million Indians. The causes raised in the second season were supported by over 30 million people and the season generated more than one billion impressions online.

== Production ==
=== Concept ===
The concept of the show was not revealed in the Indian media until the show officially went on air on 6 May 2012. There were also no get-togethers, parties or press conferences organized to discuss the content, leading up to the premiere of the show. However, various sources reported the show to be based on "the common man" rather than being fictional. Also, based on its content, it was mostly referred as a talk show discussing social issues like child labour, health problems and other issues affecting the country. Khan, who is known for keeping secrecy for his movies, was quoted saying, "I don`t want to talk much about how the show will be, and about its format. I want everyone to see it directly on TV." However, commenting on the theme of the show, he said, "The show is about meeting the common man of India, connecting with India and its people." He also added, "Through this show we understand the problem of the people, we are not here to make a change. I am no one to change anything. I don`t think I am in the position to change anything else. I feel understanding a problem and feeling it or holding one's hand or hugging is also important. I may not have the solution, but at least I can hear and understand."

=== Development ===
Uday Shankar, CEO of STAR India, suggested Aamir Khan to venture into television. Khan, however, was hesitant at first but agreed and worked upon the concept of the show for two years. In an interview with Zee News, he said, "Initially I was scared to do the show as we were travelling on a different path. I was worried. It was in a way difficult, but we knew what we are doing is different, but it comes straight from our heart." He also added, "I cannot say I understand TV completely. I was earlier scared to go ahead with the project. I can only say I have made this show with complete honesty and without compromising on anything."

The shooting of the show took place in several states of India and Khan traveled extensively over several weeks to various places in Rajasthan, Kashmir, Kerala, Delhi, Punjab, and in the Northeast India. The studio portions of the show were shot in Vrundavan Studio and Yash Raj Studios in Mumbai. Khan was adamant about naming the show 'Satyameva Jayate' as he felt it completely gelled with the theme, which indicated that the show is of, for and belongs to people of India. However, Khan later learnt the fact that the title 'Satyameva Jayate' belonged to the country and cannot be registered for the copyrights as it cannot be exploited on a creative level for promotional activities. The team however went ahead and borrowed the title.

== Soundtrack ==
Aamir Khan came up with the idea of launching a music album for the show. He along with Ram Sampath, the music director of Delhi Belly, created 13 songs for the 13 episodes that were telecast in the inaugural season of the show. In addition, the songs from the album of the show were released digitally every week on Hungama.com and also across all mobile operators as the series proceeds. The album was also released in Malayalam, Tamil, Telugu and Kannada. Sukhwinder Singh recorded a 22-minute-long song for the show which was written by Prasoon Joshi. On the song, Sukhwinder Singh said, "Yes, I Nishit Mehta, Swaroop Khan and many more have sung a song which will be used in the title track and some will be incorporated in the show. It is a dream song; it is a song which will reflect humanity and nationality."

Season 1
No.	Title	Lyrics	Music	Singer	Length
1.	"Chiraiyya"	Swanand Kirkire	Ram Sampath	Swanand Kirkire	3:24
2.	"Dheere Dheere Haule Haule"	Svati Chakravarti	Ram Sampath	Ram Sampath	4:14
3.	"Rupaiya"	Swanand Kirkire	Ram Sampath	Sona Mohapatra	6:09
4.	"Masoom Si Naav Zindagi"	Suresh Bhatia	Ram Sampath	Ram Sampath	5:25
5.	"Ghar Yaad Aata Hai Mujhe"	Svati Chakravarti & Suresh Bhatia	Ram Sampath	Ram Sampath, Sona Mohapatra	2:58
6.	"Chanda Pe Dance"	Munna Dhiman	Ram Sampath	Sona Mohapatra, Shadab Faridi	4:13
7.	"Sakhi"	Swanand Kirkire	Ram Sampath	Meenal Jain	5:16
8.	"Mathi Bole"	Prasoon Joshi	Ram Sampath	Krishna Beura	5:27
9.	"Ae Zindagi"	Munna Dhiman	Ram Sampath	Ram Sampath	3:56
10.	"Kabir Vani"	Munna Dhiman	Ram Sampath	Keerthi Sagathia	3:32
11.	"Bahut Yaad Aathe Ho"	Munna Dhiman	Ram Sampath	Jaswinder Singh	2:49
12.	"Jal Na Jaaye Jal"	Munna Dhiman	Ram Sampath	Sukhwinder Singh	4:05
13.	"Nikal Pado Re Bandhu"	Munna Dhiman	Ram Sampath	Bonnie Chakraborty	3:39

Season 2
No.	Title	Lyrics	Music	Singer	Length
1.	"Bekhauff"	Svati Chakravarty	Ram Sampath	Sona Mohapatra	3:41
2.	"Dhoondta Hai Man Mera"	Suresh Bhatia	Ram Sampath	Ram Sampath	4:09
3.	"Aam Ke Aam Honge"	Suresh Bhatia	Ram Sampath	Rituraj	5:01
4.	"Kaun Madari Yahan Kaun Jhamura"	Swanand Kirkire	Ram Sampath	Swanand Kirkire	4:37
5.	"Bharat Bhagya Vidhata"	Suresh Bhatia	Shankar Mahadevan	Shankar Mahadevan	4:25

Season 3
No.	Title	Lyrics	Music	Singer	Length
1.	"Khelen"	Swanand Kirkire	Ram Sampath	Aman Trikha, Arnab Chakrabarty, Pawni Pandey	4:13
2.	"Yeh Duaa"	Suresh Bhatia	Ram Sampath	Ram Sampath	4:09
3.	"Maati"	Swanand Kirkire	Ram Sampath	Bonnie Chakraborty	3:45
4.	"Saawan Aayo Re"	Svati Bhatkal	Ram Sampath	Ram Sampath	5:16
5.	"Mumkin Hai"	Ram Sampath	Ram Sampath	Ram Sampath	3:23

=== Controversy ===
Palash Sen, the lead singer of the Indian rock band Euphoria sued and sent a legal notice to Ram Sampath, for plagiarism of the title track of the show. Sen commented that, "The trailers and the anthem of this show have been running on television for quite a while, but I had not seen the videos. When I heard it, I was shocked." He claimed that in the year 2000, his band Euphoria released its second album Phir Dhoom, and one of its songs was named "Satyameva Jayate". According to him, the refrain of Ram Sampath's track is exactly the same as the chants in his song. He went on to add that, "They've basically used the same refrain. Jo baaki ka gaana hai (the rest of the song), has different words and tune. But the mainstay of the song — the chorus – is ours." Sen also stated that he wouldn't have minded giving Sampath the permission to use the tune of his version of "Satyamev Jayate" had he asked him for his consent and in return he would have just asked for a small credit to the band for the song.

== Broadcast ==
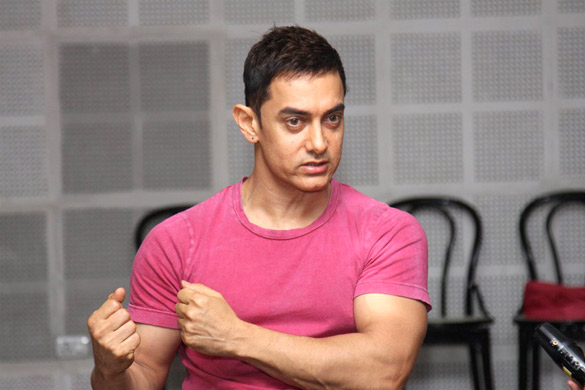
Aamir Khan at Satyamev Jayate press conference, 12 July 2012.

Satyamev Jayate was the first show of Indian television which aired simultaneously on a private channel network STAR and a national broadcaster Doordarshan. The show was dubbed in several languages including three southern Indian languages viz., Malayalam, Tamil and Telugu, along with Bengali and Marathi. Apart from Star Plus, the show was simulcast on STAR World (with English Subtitles), STAR Utsav, STAR Pravah, STAR Jalsha, Asianet and STAR Vijay within the STAR Network and other channels including DD National and Eenadu TV. Besides India, the show aired in over 100 countries around the world. On the broadcast, Khan commented, "This show is being launched on a large scale. I had to make complete use of this medium. This is a baby step in that direction."

Satyamev Jayate was dubbed into Kannada but was not broadcast in the language, due to a self-imposed and self-enforced ban by the Kannada film industry, which does not allow a dubbed version of any serial or movie to telecast in the state. The Kannada film industry, however, does approve Kannada remakes of the same. After the first episode, Shiv Sena chief Bal Thackeray requested the Karnataka government to allow the show to be aired. On the issue, Thackeray commented that "This show must not be tied up in parochial chains or barred from the public. This is our view." Khan also requested the Karnataka Film Chamber of Commerce to allow the show to be aired in Karnataka. The first episode in Kannada was later released on show's official site.

The show premiered on 6 May 2012 and was telecast on Sundays at 11 am IST thereafter. While the channel authorities were high on showcasing it in the prime time at 9 pm, Khan wanted to telecast it on Sunday mornings since the slot was commonly considered as "family TV viewing" time in Indian television after popular shows Mahabharata and Ramayana were aired on Sunday mornings and were highly successful. He was reported saying, "I wanted to telecast my show on Sunday morning. I want each family to watch the show and connect with it. We have watched Ramayana and Mahabharata and it used to come on Sunday morning. The shows created a different atmosphere." He further added that, "I don't understand TRPs and GRPs. I have no idea how to calculate it! I don't care about it. It is important to reach out to the Indian audiences. If viewers want to see, they will see or else it is up to them."

=== Special screening in villages ===
Star Plus organised a special screening of the first episode of the show in some villages in Gujarat, Maharashtra and Uttar Pradesh where the villagers do not have access to television. The initiative was said to have been taken to ensure Satyamev Jayate reaches all over the country as it caters to the issues of the common people of the country. The program was screened on 6 May 2012, during the same time it was aired across the country, on community TV sets in villages like Bhingara and Kahupatta in Maharashtra, Chepa in Gujarat, Jhunkar in Madhya Pradesh, Tikeri, Lalpur, Sarauta, Khannapurwa and Maniram in Uttar Pradesh. Most of these villages are reported to have a population of less than 5,000. Gayatri Yadav from STAR India stated that, "This is an important and relevant show for all of India and Star India is going all out to make sure that this show reaches out to all Indians even in places with limited or no TV connectivity." Based on the response to its first episode, the screening of subsequent episodes in a similar manner is being considered by STAR.

=== Sponsors ===
The show was presented and sponsored by Airtel and co-sponsored by Aqua guard. Other associate sponsors included Coca-Cola, Johnson & Johnson, Skoda Auto, Axis Bank, Berger Paints and Dixcy Scott. The title sponsorship was signed at around ₹160 million (US$1.7 million) to ₹200 million (US$2.1 million), while associate sponsors paid around ₹60 million (US$640,000) to ₹70 million (US$750,000). STAR India was reported to give exclusivity to its sponsors by not selling any advertising spots to any of its sponsors competitor's brand. Khan asked his brand managers not to buy any advertising slots or screen any of his advertisements during the show, fearing the dilution of its impact. The channel was reportedly paid a sum of ₹1 million (US$11,000) for a 10-second advertising slot and had only 30 seconds of ad inventory left after the first episode went on air.

== Marketing ==
=== Promotions ===
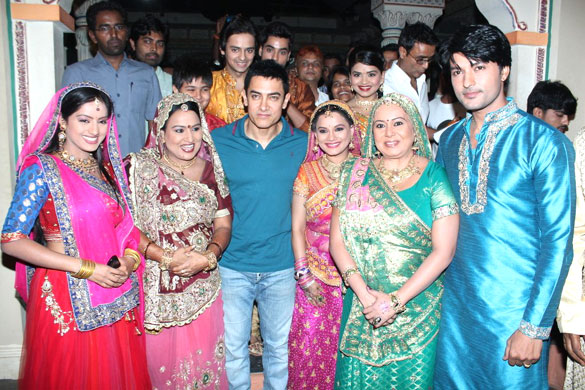
Aamir Khan promotes Satyamev Jayate on Diya Aur Baati Hum serial

The teasers of the show were premiered on YouTube on 2 April 2012. The makers of show booked around 2,000 slots for the broadcaster's promos in 27 hours for an amount of ₹62.5 million (US$670,000). Reportedly, this was the highest costing promotional campaign for any Indian television show. Besides, the show was also promoted in Indian theaters. The theme song of the show was shown in 300 theaters across the country after the national anthem. In addition, interactive sessions were organized with audiences about the show in selected multiplexes of Mumbai and New Delhi. The responses of the audience were recorded and shown on screen during movie intervals. B. V. Rao of Aamir Khan Productions, claimed that "This is the first time that a TV show is being promoted in cinema halls." On 3 May 2012, Khan appeared on the daily soap Diya Aur Baati Hum, aired on Star Plus to promote the show.

=== Theme song ===
External videos
- Satyamev Jayate official theme song featuring Aamir Khan on YouTube

The promo song of the show was composed by Ram Sampath, written by Prasoon Joshi and sung by Keerthi Sagathia & Nishit Mehta. Initially planned to compose a national song or an anthem, the team, however, composed a patriotic love song reflecting the love for the country and relating it with each Indian. The song was shot by Ram Madhvani in different states of India and was released on 13 April 2012.

=== Mobile application ===
An official software application for the show was developed by Hungama Digital Media Entertainment and was released on Apple Appstore for iOS devices including iPhone, iPad and iPod for ₹100 (US$1.10) approximately. The app allowed apple users to stream songs and videos of each of its episodes and supported social integration, donation through Airtel money service, and followed the shows official Twitter timeline. Upon release, the app surpassed Instagram to make it to the top 25 apps on the Appstore within a couple of days. The app also ranked number one in the entertainment category.

== Reception ==
=== Critical response ===
The show opened to highly positive reviews. Several media organizations praised Aamir Khan for his effort and described the show as a movement. In her review, Ritu Singh of IBN Live stated, "Aamir Khan deserves an applause for bringing up such a sensitive issue and presenting it in a hard hitting way. The amount of research Aamir and his team has put into the show was clearly visible with the facts and figures presented. Every aspect of the issue was covered with great diligence." She concluded it by saying, "'Satyamev Jayate' is not just a show; it’s a movement to change people’s mindset." Parmita Uniyal from Hindustan Times praised the content and format of the show and said, "Aamir Khan have to step in to do what journalists are supposed to do – make a difference. The show is a classic example of that." Gayatri Sankar from Zee News described the show as an "eye opener" and commented that, "Satyamev Jayate will make you unlearn all the wrong you have learnt and discover that compassionate human your soul wishes to be. The show grips you and leaves you dumfounded! You will be left asking for more and would wish the show never ends." Trade analyst and film critic Komal Nahta commended that, "I cried while watching the show. I think people will watch it as it has touched an emotional chord." Neeraj Roy, managing director and chief executive of Hungama Digital Media Entertainment, also praised the show by commending "Brilliant effort. Well done Aamir Khan and Satyamev Jayate. We can make a difference." Sukanya Verma from Rediff.com expressed concerns regarding the show saying, "This is a grand initiative and a sound format into which a lot has been invested -- monetarily as well as in terms of research. Deriding this show simply because it is hosted by a Bollywood actor who is also a marketing whiz, questions our credibility, not his."

Some reviewers also criticized the show on various grounds. A review from Outlook India noted that, "[...] the show might well heighten awareness, enable the efforts of those doing real work at the ground level, and get the issue out of the denial closet, [...] But it is a little unrealistic to expect a film star and a TV show to change the world." Subhash Jha from The Times of India commented on the show, "...though brave and thought provoking, was disappointing in its lack of genuine connectivity between the host and the victims of social atrocity. At the moment Satyamev Jayate looks like a product of elitist conscientiousness." Sheela Bhatt, from Rediff.com, commented that the format of Satyameva Jayate has to be more profound, and the big problem of the show is that it is on predictable lines. She went on conclude by requesting Khan to bring in some raw energy in the show.

=== Viewers' response ===
The show also received positive feedback from various eminent personalities such as social activists, media houses, film and television personalities. Bal Thackeray, the founder and chief of the political party Shiv Sena praised the show and Khan for bringing out social issues in front of public. Prominent social activist and retired IPS officer Kiran Bedi described the show as "creative, evidence based, emotionally connecting and inspiring" while commenting that, "It is an expression of the power of media and the inherent potential of society in resolving its own problems." Noted film actress Shabana Azmi appreciated the show for its research and emotional content: "Aamir Khan's show can bring a revolution. Thoroughly researched covers all aspects touches emotional chord n forces us to reexamine ourselves." While film producer Ekta Kapoor proclaimed the show as "the best show of the decade", film directors Madhur Bhandarkar and Farhan Akhtar also praised the show commenting that the show brought the "desired change" to the small screen and that it is "a show with a heart" respectively. Other high personalities who lauded the show included Salman Khan, Dilip Kumar, Preity Zinta, Dia Mirza, Boman Irani, Neha Dhupia, Mandira Bedi, Kabir Bedi, Mini Mathur, Kabir Khan, Maria Goretti, Vishal Dadlani, Ken Ghosh, Harsha Bhogle & Pritish Nandy.

Apart from the critics, film, social and political personalities, the show was well received by the television viewers describing it as "a gutsy, hard-hitting and sensible program that strikes an emotional chord with the audiences." As per Indiantelevision.com, the show garnered an overall rating of 4.27 television ratings (TVR) (including terrestrial of DD) across the 6 metropolitan cities: Delhi, Mumbai, Kolkata, Chennai, Bangalore and Hyderabad, upon its premiere telecast on 6 May 2012. According to the Television Audience Measurement (TAM), the show reached out to 8.96 million people in the age group of 4+. One hundred thousand people tried calling in from across the country to speak to Khan during the show out of which 10 or 11 people could eventually get through.

On its premiere day, several topics related to the show were seen trending on the microblogging site Twitter, occupying the "top five trends" on the site. The show received as many as 2,254 tweets on the social networking site, even before the show ended its premiere telecast and reached to more than 3800 tweets on the day. The hashtag #SatyamevJayate began trending in the morning and continued to stay at the top through to the end of the day. Next, the show's official site, satyamevjayate.in, was crashed within minutes of the end of the first episode due to huge traffic. The site posted the message, "Thank you for your overwhelming response to Satyamev Jayate. Unfortunately our servers have crashed due to the traffic, will be back soon." Also Satyamev Jayate was the top search in India on Google Trends. As of May 2012, the show's official page on Facebook has received more than 1,451,202 likes of which 233,000 likes were received on the day of its premiere. The first episode also opened many discussions on video sharing site YouTube, wherein, people left emotional messages on the site. "A man who wanted a boy said that after watching the show he cried and he apologized to his wife and said that he just wants her to be happy," said Khan when talking to media. Hindustan Times conducted an online poll asking the viewers, "Did you like Aamir Khan's Satyamev Jayate?" to which 88% viewers agreed that they liked the show, 5% felt that Khan and the show failed to impress and 7% remained undecided, waiting to watch more episodes before forming their opinion.

Persistent Systems Ltd, an Indian IT consultancy, was the analytics (insights) partner for this show. Season 1 of Satyamev Jayate garnered 1.2 billion impressions on the web. It ranked as the most talked about new show on the social media in the world. Gigaom quoted that "Satyamev Jayate, one of India’s highest-rated television shows, is using data as a means to effect meaningful change". Persistent Systems used The Big Data Solution to help Satyamev Jayate keep track of how its viewership is interacting with the show. The show aggregated viewers responses from Social Media (Facebook, Twitter and YouTube), Satyamev Jayate Website (SpeakUp and DisQus) as well as from dedicated phone lines for the show. Variety of languages used in the responses, different formats of the responses and the need of unearthing more sentiments from the messages were challenging for the analytics team. The most responses came in Hinglish, a mix of Hindi and English. They were in either text, audio or video format. The analytics were beyond just Praise and Criticism. Persistent Systems had more than 50 tags available for every episode for message analysis. Star India Network's Chief Marketing Officer Gayatri Yadav commented "What social media did was far beyond anything producers anticipated. It took the show and made it the people’s show" about the response from social networking sites.

The issues discussed on the show garnered national attention, with several being discussed in parliament and influencing politicians and lawmakers to take action. After the first episode, for example, Rajasthan Chief Minister, Ashok Gehlot, urged public representatives and non-governmental organisations to take actions to stop the illegal practice of female foeticide. Khan met Gehlot over the issue, and Gehlot accepted the request to set up fast track court to deal the case of the sting operation featured on the show. Following the second episode, the helpline for children received an increased number of calls from across the country, reporting child abuse. The legislation to protect children below 18 years from sexual abuse became a reality with the Lok Sabha passing the bill. After exposing medical malpractice in another episode, Aamir Khan became the first non-MP to be invited to the Indian parliament, where he and his creative team presented research on the subject and discussed core issues related to the medical fraternity.

The show has also been well received overseas, including many parts of Asia as well as some parts of Africa. The overseas market where it received the most interest was China, where it was initially watched online before being licensed to air on Chinese television in 2014, due to Aamir Khan's popularity there after the success of his film 3 Idiots (2009). His work on Satyamev Jayate, as well as similar issues raised in his films, such as Taare Zameen Par (2007), 3 Idiots, PK (2014), and Dangal (2016), has led to Khan being referred to as a "national treasure of India" or "conscience of India" by Chinese media. The show is highly regarded in China, where it is one of the highest-rated productions on popular Chinese site Douban.

=== Comparisons ===
Indian television producer-director Siddhartha Basu compared the show with The Oprah Winfrey Show stating, "I think Aamir makes for a pensive and studied Oprah. More power to him and even more power to issues he raises that affect us all. Hopefully, it will get people thinking and acting on it on a much bigger scale". The Hindustan Times and Wall Street Journal also compared the show with The Oprah Winfrey Show.

Parmita Uniyal from Hindustan Times felt the show succeeds in convincing people of the outcomes of such practices better than a government campaign on female infanticide or a television soap like Balika Vadhu. Esha Razdan from Daily Bhaskar said the show was similar to reality shows like Crime Patrol or Bhanwar that were successful in staging the emotions perfectly on small screen but were treated differently in terms of format.

== Episodes ==
=== Season One ===
Episode	Title	Topic	Song	Original Air date
1	Daughters are precious	Female foeticide in India	"O Ri Chiraiya"	6 May 2012
2	Break the Silence	Child sexual abuse	"Haule Haule"	13 May 2012
3	Marriage or Marketplace?	Dowry system in India	"Rupaiya"	20 May 2012
4	Every Life is Precious	Medical malpractice	"Naav"	27 May 2012
5	Intolerance to Love	Love marriages and Honor killings in India	"Ghar Yaad Aata Hai Mujhe"	3 June 2012
6	Persons with disabilities	Physical Disabilities	"Chanda Pe Dance"	10 June 2012
7	Danger at home	Domestic Violence	"Sakhi"	17 June 2012
8	Poison on our Plate?	Pesticide poisoning and Organic farming	"Maati Bole"	24 June 2012
9	Think before you Drink	Alcohol abuse	"Ae Zindagi"	1 July 2012
10	Dignity for All	Casteism and Untouchability	"Kabir Vani"	8 July 2012
11	Sunset Years, Sunshine Life	Old age	"Bahut Yaad Aate Ho"	15 July 2012
12	Every Drop Counts	Water crisis and Rainwater harvesting	"Jal na Jaaye Jal"	22 July 2012
13	Idea of India	We The People	"Nikal Pado"	29 July 2012
14	Satyamev Jayate Ka Safar	Independence Day Special	-	15 August 2012

=== Season Two ===
Episode	Title	Topic	Song	Original Air date
1	Fighting Rape	Rape in India	"Bekhauf"	2 March 2014
2	Police	State of Police Affairs in India	"Dhoondata Hai Man Mera"	9 March 2014
3	Don't Waste your Garbage	Solid Waste Management	"Aam ke Aam Honge"	16 March 2014
4	Kings Every Day	Corruption	"Kaun Madaari Yahan Kaun Jamura"	23 March 2014
5	Criminalisation of Politics	Crimes and Elections	" Bharat Bhagya Vidhata"	30 March 2014

=== Season Three ===
Episode	Title	Topic	Song	Original Air date
1	A Ball Can Change The World	Changing Lives with Sports	"Khelen"	5 October 2014
2	Road Accidents or Murders?	Road accidents		12 October 2014
3	Accepting Alternative Sexualities	LGBT community	"Maati Maati Mey"	19 October 2014
4	TB - The Ticking Time Bomb	Tuberculosis		26 October 2014
5	Nurturing Mental Health	Mental Health	"Dekho sawan aayo re"	2 November 2014
6	When Masculinity harms Men	Masculinity in Society		9 November 2014

== See also ==
- 7 RCR (TV Series)
- Samvidhaan (TV Series)
- Pradhanmantri (TV Series)
- Dangal (film)
- Secret Superstar
