= Ram Madhvani =

Indian filmmaker

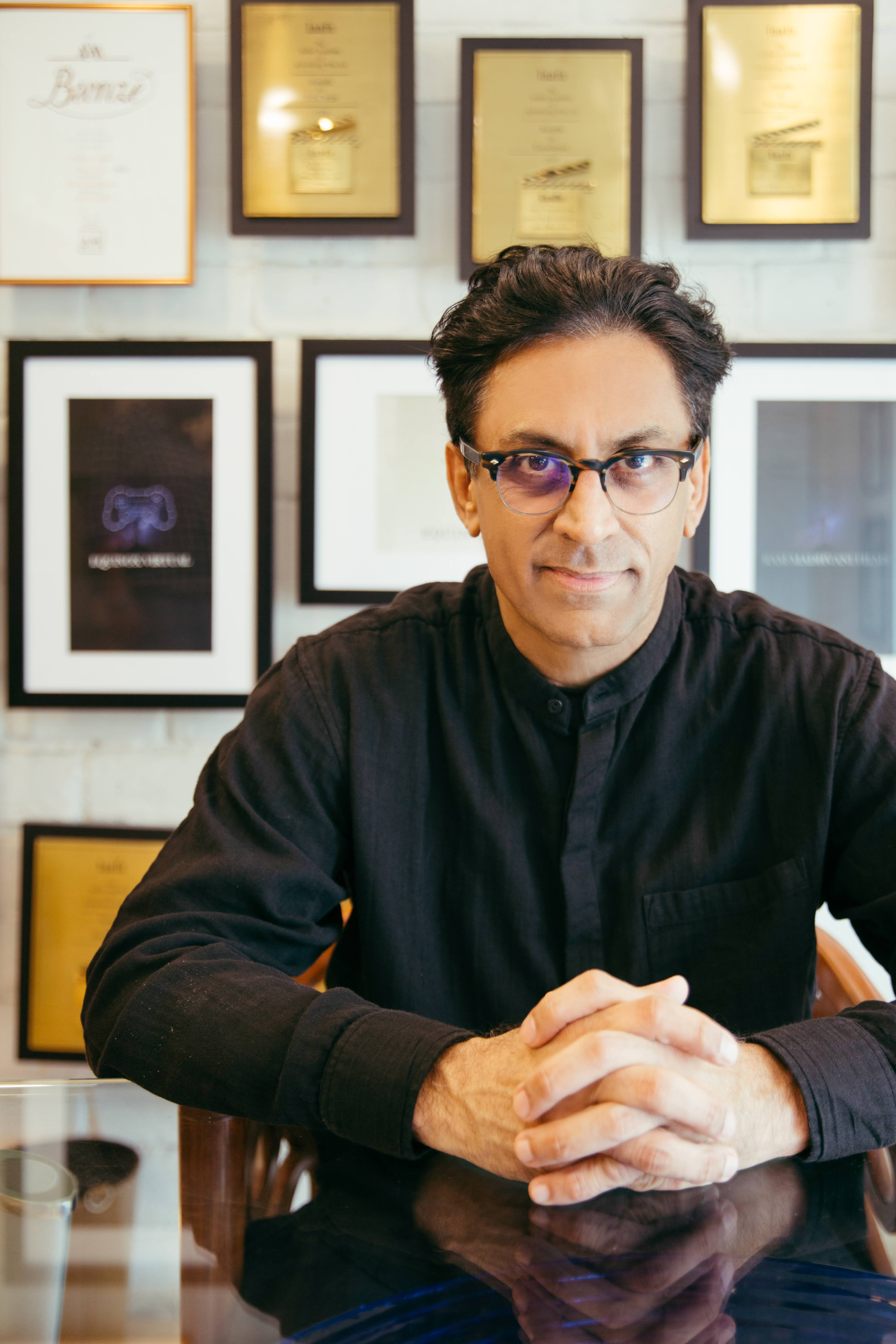
- Ram Madhvani at Mumbai Office
- Born: Mumbai, India
- Occupations: Film director, Film producer
- Spouse: Amita Madhvani

Ram Madhvani is an Indian film director, producer, and creator known for one of the few people who has received the national award for his film Neerja, an International Emmy nomination for his series Aarya and two Cannes advertising award for his commercials.

He is the Co-founder, Director, and Producer at Equinox Films, Ram Madhvani Films, and Equinox Virtual, a company establishing itself in the global gaming ecosphere, in partnership with Amita Madhvani.

Ram is acclaimed for his National Award-winning Hindi feature film 'Neerja', starring Sonam Kapoor and Shabana Azmi. Under Ram Madhvani Films, Ram and Amita has created the International Emmy-nominated series, 'Aarya', starring Sushmita Sen. The first season premiered on Disney+ Hotstar on 19 June 2020, followed by Season 2 on 10 December 2021.

His Hindi feature film 'Dhamaka starring Kartik Aaryan and Mrunal Thakur released on 19 November 2021 on Netflix as a global release and was listed amongst five action films to be streamed by The New York Times in December 2021. The highly anticipated Season 3 of 'Aarya' was released in two parts on 3 November 2023 and 9 February 2024 respectively, captivating audiences worldwide. Currently, all seasons are streaming worldwide and available via Hulu, further solidifying Ram Madhvani's reputation as a prominent figure in Indian cinema and streaming content.

== Career ==
Ram Madhvani is a filmmaker internationally producing and directing feature films, web series, commercials, short films and music videos.

=== Advertisements ===
Happydent has also been voted one of the Top 20 Commercials of the Millennium by the Gunn Report, with Ram ranked number 11 in the Most Awarded Directors by the same report. It was the only Indian advertisement on the list. The Commercials for Happydent and LMN, directed by Ram, were amongst the Top 20 of the last twenty years in the Shots magazine.

In 2012, Ram was the president of the jury for film craft at Adfest Bangkok.

=== Feature Films & Web Series ===
In 2002, Madhvani released his directorial debut feature film, 'Let's Talk', with actors Boman Irani and Maia Katrak, which premiered at the Locarno Film Festival and won him the Best Debut Director at the Srinivas Gollapudi National Awards.

In 2007, Aamir Khan approached Ram to direct the song 'Bheja Kum' for the film 'Taare Zameen Par'.

In 2012, Ram was again approached to direct the official theme song video for Aamir Khan's TV series 'Satyamev Jayate'.

In February 2015, Ram directed the aviation drama biographical film 'Neerja', starring Sonam Kapoor, Shabana Azmi and Shekhar Ravjiani, which was critically acclaimed and commercially successful. It was produced under the banner of Fox Star Studios and Bling Unplugged, with Amita Madhvani being the Associate Producer. The film also won the prestigious National Award for Best Hindi Feature Film.

In June 2020, Ram launched his own production house - Ram Madhvani Films - while simultaneously entering the world of web series with 'Aarya', featuring Sushmita Sen. The first season marked India's presence on the global map by bagging an International Emmy nomination in 2021.

After the success of 'Aarya' and 'Neerja', Ram Madhvani Films announced an adaptation of the South Korean film 'The Terror Live', titled 'Dhamaka', co-produced with RSVP movies, featuring Kartik Aaryan and Mrunal Thakur. The film was released on 19 November 2021, on Netflix. The film, a dramatic thriller, was released on 19 November 2021 on Netflix.

Ram was the creator and a co-director for Aarya Season 2, which streamed on Disney+ Hotstar on 10 December 2021.

Ram was the creator, co-producer and also a co-director for Aarya Season 2, which streamed on Disney+ Hotstar on 10 December 2021. The series received widespread critical acclaim and garnered immense love from OTT viewers globally. Additionally, Ram continued with the release of Aarya Season 3.

=== Short films ===
Ram Madhvani directed a short documentary film titled 'Everlasting Light', showcasing Indian film actor Amitabh Bachchan, premiered at the Lincoln Center in New York.

In March 2017, he released his short film This Bloody Line, on the Sir Cyril Radcliffe and on the Partition, commissioned by '#BigShorts for India Tomorrow' by India Today.

== Filmography ==
Key
†	Denotes films that are not yet been released

=== Films ===
Year	Title	Director	Producer	Notes
2000	Mission Kashmir	Associate	No	
2002	Let's Talk	Yes	Co-producer	
2016	Neerja	Yes	No	
2021	Dhamaka	Yes	Yes	Netflix film
TBA	Dive †	No	Yes	Announced

=== Web series ===
Year	Title	Director	Producer	Platform
2020–2024	Aarya	Yes	Yes	Disney+ Hotstar, Hulu
2025	The Waking of a Nation	Yes	Yes	SonyLIV
