= Ram Sampath =

Indian musician (born 1977)

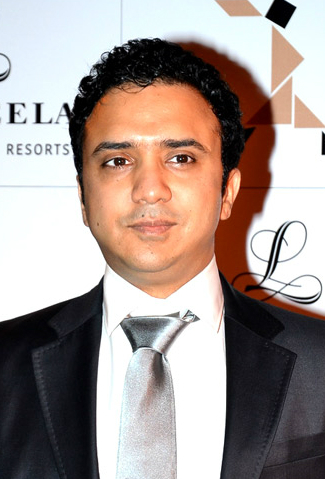
- Ram Sampath at the Loreal Paris Femina Women Awards 2014.

Background information
- Born: 25 July 1977 (age 49); Bombay, Maharashtra, India
- Occupations: music director, composer, record producer, Singer
- Years active: 1997–2017 2023-present
- Label: Various
- Spouse: Sona Mohapatra (m. 2005)
- Website: www.ramsampath.com

Ram Sampath (born 25 July 1977) is an Indian composer, music producer and musician, who started his career composing advertising jingles for Mumbai-based advertising industry, subsequently he started composing for pop albums like Tanha Dil (2000) by Shaan, before composing for films like Khakee, Delhi Belly (2011), Talaash (2012), Raees etc.

He has composed music for advertising jingles for brands like Airtel, Docomo, Thums Up, Pepsi and the Times of India.

== Early life and background ==
Born to a Tamil father and Kannadiga mother, Sampath grew up in Chembur, Mumbai where he did his schooling from OLPS High School. Both his parents were musically inclined, while his grandfather TV Ramanujam, was one of the founders of Shanmukhananda Hall, a cultural centre in Sion, Mumbai, established in 1952. Thus his ancestral house, was frequented by leading musicians and singers of Carnatic music. Later on, he too learnt Carnatic music for eight years. After his schooling he studied commerce at Podar College, Mumbai, where he played keyboard in a rock band.

== Career ==
=== Non-film music ===
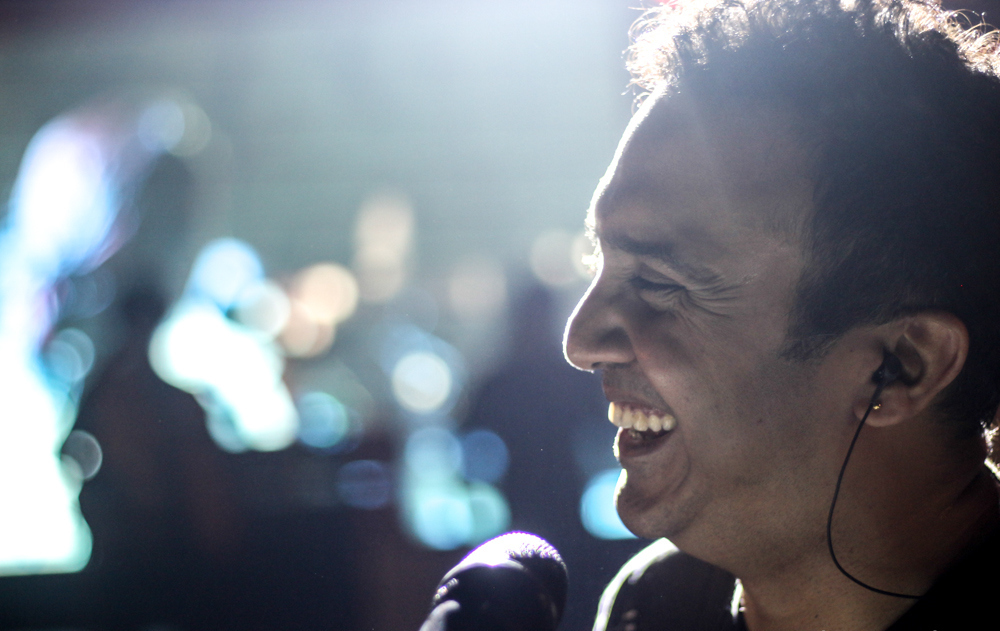
Ram Sampath at MTV Coke Studio

Sampath's first album as a composer was Love-Ology in 1997, sang by singer Shaan, who was his first solo album. Over the years, he has composed advertising jingles for brands like Airtel, Docomo, Thums Up, Pepsi and the Times of India, for which he composed the theme song for the "I Lead India" campaign in 2013.

In 2008, he collaborated with the Australian rock band INXS to record Indian version of their songs, God's Top Ten, Devil's Party, and Afterglow. Also in 2008, the Bombay High Court ruled that two songs from the film, Krazzy 4, including the title track "Krazzy4" and "Break-free" plagiarised the "hook-phrase" from an advertisement previously composed by Sampath for Sony Ericsson. The court ordered a stay on film's release with the two songs. Subsequently, the case was settled out-of-court after producers paid Sampath ₹20 million (US$210,000), and film was released along with the songs. However the judgment was seen by "landmark decision" by legal commentators, as it set a new precedent in the Indian film industry, often plagued with plagiarism. In 2012, he composed the highly popular title track "Tera Rang Aisa" of the debut talkshow Satyamev Jayate hosted by Aamir Khan, it had lyrics by Prasoon Joshi.

He was also part of the 2013 season of the popular television music series Coke Studio.

=== Film music ===
Sampath got his first break as a film score composer with Let's Talk (2002) directed by Ram Madhvani. Thereafter, he composed for several films like Khakee (2004) and Family (2006) by Rajkumar Santoshi, besides Jumbo (2008), Aagey Se Right (2009) and Luv Ka The End (2011). However, he first received popular acclaim with Delhi Belly (2011) produced by Aamir Khan. Most notably hit track "Bhaag DK Bose Aandhi Aayi" with -rock beat, became an internet sensation ahead of the release of the film. Later he received a Filmfare Award nomination for the film. His next film, Talaash (2012) was a joint production between Farhan Akhtar's Excel Entertainment and Aamir Khan Productions also starring Aamir Khan as the lead. The music received positive reviews, including Indiaglitz, which noted, "Once again Ram Sampath has an unmatched compilation of tracks here. Along with Javed Akhtar's fantastic lyrics they have created a masterpiece here." Thereafter, Akhtar signed him again for his next production, Fukrey, directed by Mrigdeep Singh Lamba. Fukrey was a sleeper hit and opened to good music reviews, especially for the song "Ambarsariya", an adaptation of a traditional Punjabi folk song, performed by Sona Mohapatra, his wife and regular collaborator.

=== Television ===
In 2009, he appeared as a judge of singing reality series, MTV Rock On (Season 1) on MTV India, along with singer Kailash Kher and MTV VJ Nikhil Chinapa.

== Personal life ==
Ram Sampath is married to Sona Mohapatra, a singer, who is his frequent collaborator and business partner in their music production house OmGrown Music. The couple resides in Mumbai. The couple met in 2002, while she was still working as a brand manager with Marico. They were introduced by director Ram Madhvani, with whom Sampath was working for Let's Talk (2002); they married in 2005.

== Discography ==
=== Films ===
Year	Film	Director	Notes
2002	Let's Talk	Ram Madhvani	English-language film.
2004	Khakee	Rajkumar Santoshi	
2005	Chehraa	Saurabh Shukla	One song
2006	Family	Rajkumar Santoshi	
2007	Positive	Farhan Akhtar	Short film
2008	Jumbo	Kompin Kemgumnird	Animation film
2009	Aagey Se Right	Indrajit Nattoji	Along with Amartya Bobo Rahut
2010	Peepli Live	Anusha Rizvi	One song
2010	Phillum City	Deven Khote	
2011	Luv Ka The End	Bumpy	
2011	Game	Abhinay Deo	Background Score only
2011	Delhi Belly	Abhinay Deo	Filmfare Award Nomination for Best Music Screen Award Nomination for Best Music
2012	Talaash	Reema Kagti	
2013	Fukrey	Mrighdeep Singh Lamba	
2013	Aurangzeb	Atul Shabarwal	Sang the song "Barbadiyan"; Composed by Amartya Bobo Rahut
2014	Bhoothnath Returns	Nitesh Tiwari	Three songs
2014	Purani Jeans	Tanushri Chattrji Bassu	
2014	Ekkees Toppon Ki Salaami	Ravindra Gautam	
2015	Bangistan	Karan Anshuman	
2016	Raman Raghav 2.0	Anurag Kashyap	
2016	Tere Bin Laden: Dead or Alive	Abhishek Sharma	One song
2017	Raees	Rahul Dholakia	Five songs
2023	Kathal	Yashowardhan Mishra	Netflix film
2024	Laapataa Ladies	Kiran Rao	
2025	Sitaare Zameen Par	R. S. Prasanna	Background Score only
2026	Ek Din	Sunil Pandey	
2026	Don't Be Shy	Sreeti Mukerji	

=== Albums ===
Year	Album	Singer
1997	Love-Ology	Shaan
1997	Mohabbat Kar Le	Shiamak Davar
1998	Colourblind	Ram Sampath
2000	Tanha Dil	Shaan
2006	Sona	Sona Mohapatra

=== Television ===
Year	Programme	Notes
2009	MTV Rock On (Season 1)	Judge (Reality singing competition)
1998	Baat Ban Jaaye	Title Song
2012	Satyamev Jayate	14 Songs: title track and 13 theme based songs played at the end of each episode.
2013	MTV Coke Studio season 3	6 songs
2015	MTV Coke Studio season 4	4 songs

== Awards and nominations ==
Year	Category	Nominated work	Result	Ref.
Filmfare Awards
2012	Best Music Director	Delhi Belly	Nominated	
2025	Best Music Director	Laapataa Ladies	Won	
2025	Best Background Score	Laapataa Ladies	Won	
Mirchi Music Awards
2011	Best Background Score of the Year	Delhi Belly	Won	
2012	Indie Pop Song of the Year	"Satyamev Jayate"	Won	
2012	Programmer & Arranger of the Year	"Jiya Laage Na" from Talaash	Nominated	
