= Love marriage =

Marriage where consent from parents is not required

A love marriage is one which is driven solely by the couple, with or without the consent of their parents, as opposed to arranged marriage. While there is no clear definition of love marriage, the term was in common use globally during the Victorian era. It is still used in the Commonwealth countries of India, Pakistan, Bangladesh and Sri Lanka, as well as Nepal and Egypt.

== In Europe ==
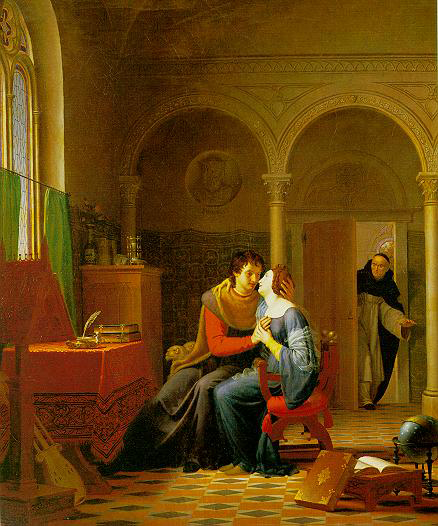
"Abaelardus and Heloïse surprised by Master Fulbert", by Romanticist painter Jean Vignaud (1819)

According to the American historian Stephanie Coontz, marriages between Anglo-Saxons were organised to establish peace and trading relationships. She writes that in the 11th century, marriages were organised on the basis of securing economic advantages or political ties, and the wishes of the couples were not considered important. The bride was especially expected to defer to her father's wishes. Coontz has argued that while love marriages were not universal, marriages based on love and personal commitments started to emerge as early as the 14th century and really began to flower in the 18th century.

In 1140, Decretum Gratiani was written by Gratian. It made consent of the couple a requirement for marriage. The book became the foundation of the policy of the Christian Church on marriage.

The 1840 marriage of Queen Victoria and Prince Albert made love marriage more acceptable in the minds of the British public in the Victoria era, and love marriages were on the rise.

== In India ==
In India, love marriages started becoming popular in urban areas in the 1970s. Initially, love marriages occurred between acceptable communities. Love marriages now commonly transcend ethnic, community and religion barriers.

In a 2012 survey conducted by Ipsos for the TV channel NDTV, 74% of the respondents said that they preferred an arranged marriage. In 2010, the National Commission for Women (NCW) released a report stating that it had documented 326 cases of honour crime in the past year, majority of which were due to inter-caste marriages.

In a 2014 survey conducted by the United Nations Population Fund and International Center for Research on Women, 11.7% of men and 8.5% of women surveyed claimed that they chose their partners and married with or without the consent of their families. The boundaries between the two types have started to blur. The term love-arranged marriage is used to describe a new emerging form of marriage which contains elements of both arranged marriage and love marriage. Love marriages are seen as imposition of the younger generation's will over the older generation's wishes.

== In Pakistan ==
In Pakistan, arranged marriages are the norm and love marriage is rare in the society. Several cases of honour killing are recorded every year. In most cases, the woman is killed, however in some cases couples are killed. The Human Rights Commission of Pakistan counted about 869 such cases reported in the media, but noted that many such cases may also be unreported.

== In Bangladesh ==
In Bangladesh, there is a strong code of social and cultural prohibition on inter-gender friendship and/or romantic relationship; there have been so many incidents of unrequited love of boys, in the context of unrequited love, boys may face punishment by mob justice on the request of the girl whom the boy loves or the girl's guardians and in the case of romantic relationship of two individuals, they secretly meet and talk, and may elope if their respective guardians are not willing to get them married.

Due to a large portion of society's Islamic adherence and conservative mentality, inter-gender friendship and romance is heavily suppressed. It is also very difficult to form a romantic relationship or to find a life partner by one's own will. It is generally hard for boys to find life-partners; they need to become earners as Bangladeshi society is very conservative and patriarchal. The society largely relies on the arranged marriage system.

There are strong records of guardian objections for various reasons whether the boy is not liked by the girl's parents or the boy is unemployed or of lower income status etc. In this case, the girl is forcibly married to a boy of her parents' choice, and if the girl elopes with another boy, her parents may file a police case against the boy. This social and cultural trend is still prevalent in Bangladeshi society. Some couples may commit suicide for not being supported by their families and society.

== In Egypt ==
In Egypt, love marriages, especially interfaith marriages, are generally considered socially unacceptable. Interfaith marriages are often seen as a tactic to recruit members from other religions. Such marriages sometimes result in sectarian violence. According to Egyptian law, a man from another religion must convert to Islam to marry a Muslim woman. However, a Christian woman may marry a Muslim man without converting, but officials require the woman to produce a letter of approval from her church, which is rarely granted.

== See also ==
- Forced marriage
- Love Commandos, a group of activists in India that protects couples who have entered a love marriage from violence.

== Bibliography ==
- Lewis, David (2011). Bangladesh: Politics, Economy and Civil Society. Cambridge University Press. ISBN 9780521886123.
