= List of Coke Studio (Indian TV program) episodes =

Coke Studio is an Indian music series that features live musical performances by various artists recorded in a studio. The series showcases a diverse range of music genres from the Indian subcontinent, including Hindustani, Carnatic, Indian folk, as well as contemporary hip hop, rock, and pop music. The show's concept is inspired by a similarly named program in Pakistan.

Initially, Coke Studio @ MTV used to feature several songs in each episode, following a consistent episodic format that continued for four seasons. However, with the launch of Coke Studio Bharat and Coke Studio Tamil, the program adopted a new format of releasing one song per month.

== Series overview ==
Series	Season	Episodes	Originally released			Producer
Series	Season	Episodes	First released	Last released	Network	Producer
MTV Edition
Coke Studio @ MTV	1	10	17 June 2011	19 August 2011	MTV India & YouTube	Leslee Lewis
Coke Studio @ MTV	2	10	7 July 2012	8 September 2012	MTV India & YouTube	Multi Producers
Coke Studio @ MTV	3	10	17 August 2013	19 October 2013	MTV India & YouTube	Multi Producers
Coke Studio @ MTV	4	6	1 March 2015	4 October 2015	MTV India & YouTube	Multi Producers
Special
Coke Music Live	Memu Aagamu		22 August 2022		YouTube	Lost Stories & S.TIGER
Tamil Edition
Coke Studio Tamil	1	7	1 February 2023	27 July 2023	YouTube	Arivu & Sean Roldan
Coke Studio Tamil	2	9	20 December 2023	25 July 2023	YouTube	Sean Roldan
Bharat Edition
Coke Studio Bharat	1	8	7 February 2023	9 October 2023	YouTube	Ankur Tewari
Coke Studio Bharat	2	6	9 February 2024	15 October 2024	YouTube	Ankur Tewari
Coke Studio Bharat	3	6	21 February 2025	present	YouTube	Ankur Tewari

== Coke Studio @ MTV ==
=== Season 1 (2011) ===
No. overall	No. in season	Song Title	Singer(s)	Lyricist(s)	Language(s)	Original release date
Episode 1
1	1	"Bichua"	Mousam & Sunidhi Chauhan	Shailendra	Assamese	June 17, 2011
1	1	"Chadhta Suraj"	K.K & Sabri Brothers	Aziz Nazan	Urdu	June 17, 2011
1	1	"Hoo"	Harshdeep Kaur	Sultan Bahu	Punjabi	June 17, 2011
1	1	"O Majhi Re"	Saurav Moni & Shaan	Gulzar	Bengali	June 17, 2011
1	1	"Tip Top"	Khagen Gogoi & Shankar Mahadevan	Traditional Indian & Shanta Shelke	Assamese & Marathi	June 17, 2011
1	1	"Vethalai"	Chinnaponnu & Kailash Kher	Chinnaponnu & Kailash Kher	Tamil & Hindi	June 17, 2011
1	1	"Yaar Basainda"	Mathangi Rajshekar & Tochi Raina	Saint Thyagaraja & Vinay Kochar	Punjabi	June 17, 2011
Episode 2
2	2	"Allah Hi Rehem"	Shankar Mahadevan	Niranjan Iyengar	Hindi	June 24, 2011
2	2	"Dheere Dheere"	Megha Sriram Dalton	Pandit Chandrashekhar Mishra	Hindi	June 24, 2011
2	2	"Jiya Laage Na"	Akriti Kakkar & Shankar Mahadevan	Rajesh Johri	Hindi	June 24, 2011
2	2	"Meherma Ve"	Akriti Kakkar & Shankar Mahadevan	Rani Malik	Punjabi	June 24, 2011
2	2	"Path Kai Pore Hoi"	Khagen Gogoi	Traditional Indian	Assamese	June 24, 2011
Episode 3
3	3	"Chitthiye (Henna)"	Sunidhi Chauhan & Wadali brothers	Ravindra Jain & Naqsh Lyallpuri	Hindi & Punjabi	July 1, 2011
3	3	"Jhakki Dil"	Sunidhi Chauhan, Mousam, Divya & Lesle Lewis	Afshan Ahmed	Hindi	July 1, 2011
3	3	"Kadiyan Aa Mil Jaye Yaar"	Wadali Brothers, Mousam Gogoi & Bondo	Traditional Indian	Punjabi	July 1, 2011
3	3	"Maula Maula / Angel"	Divya, Qadir, Murtuza & Rabani	Sarah McLachlan	Urdu & English	July 1, 2011
3	3	"Tu Mane Ya Na Mane"	Wadali Brothers	R.P. Deewana	Punjabi	July 1, 2011
Episode 4
4	4	"Dilruba"	Kailash Kher	Kailash Kher	Hindi	July 8, 2011
4	4	"Indian Jaadu"	Chinna Ponnu & Sanjeev Thomas	Sameer & Sanjeev T	Hindi, Tamil & English	July 8, 2011
4	4	"Pak Pak (Bihu Naam)"	Papon	Traditional Indian	Assamese	July 8, 2011
4	4	"Piya Ghar Aavenge"	Kailash Kher	Kailash Kher	Hindi	July 8, 2011
4	4	"Tere Naam"	Chinna Ponnu, Kailash Kher, Papon, Sanjeev Thomas, Shruti Pathak & Lesle Lewis	Chinna Ponnu & Victor Mukherjee	Tamil & Hindi	July 8, 2011
4	4	"Vethalai"	Chinna Ponnu & Kailash Kher	Traditional Indian & Kailash Kher	Tamil & Hindi	July 8, 2011
Episode 5
5	5	"Aaj Koi Jogee Aave"	Richa Sharma & Ustad Rashid Khan	Traditional Indian	Punjabi	July 15, 2013
5	5	"Aao Na Gale Lagao Na"	Parthiv Gohil & Divya Lewis	Majrooh Sultanpuri	Hindi	July 15, 2013
5	5	"Aesian Nighawan / Paluke Bangara"	Bombay Jayashri & Richa Sharma	Anand Raaj Anand, Bhadrachala Ramdas & Noor Jehan	Punjabi & Telugu	July 15, 2013
5	5	"Hey Bhagwan"	Raghu Dixit	Raghu Dixit	Assamese	July 15, 2013
5	5	"Katyayini"	Bombay Jayashri & Ustad Rashid Khan	A verse from Bhishma Parva	Hindi	July 15, 2013
5	5	"Tere Bin Main"	Bombay Jayashri, Divya Lewis, Lesle Lewis, Parthiv Gohil Raghu Dixit, Richa Sharma & Ustad Rashid Khan	Pinky Poonawala	Hindi	July 15, 2013
Episode 6
6	6	"Aay Hori He"	Pankhi Dutta & Shafqat Amanat Ali Khan	Traditional Indian & Shah Hussain	Assamese & Punjabi	July 22, 2011
6	6	"Akhiyan"	Shafqat Amanat Ali Khan	Fuzön	Urdu	July 22, 2011
6	6	"Ghir Ghir"	Advaita	Advaita	Hindi	July 22, 2011
6	6	"Kya Haal Sunawan"	Shafqat Amanat Ali Khan & Shruti Pathak	Shafqat Amanat Ali Khan	Urdu	July 22, 2011
6	6	"O Aaj Kehne Bhi Na Diya"	Pankhi Dutta	Traditional Indian	Assamese	July 22, 2011
6	6	"Tere Bin Dil Laage Na"	Shafqat Amanat Ali Khan, Advaita, Pankhi Dutta & Shruti Pathak	Manoj Yadav	Urdu	July 22, 2011
Episode 7
7	7	"Aaj Jaane Ki Zidd"	Ramya Iyer & Rupmatii Jolly	Fayyaz Hashmi	Urdu	July 29, 2011
7	7	"Humein To Loot Liya"	Sabri Brothers	Shevan Rizvi	Urdu	July 29, 2011
7	7	"Khilte Hain Gul"	KK, Mathangi Rajshekhar & Sanjay Vidyarthi	Neeraj Shridhar	Hindi	July 29, 2011
7	7	"Tu Aashiqui Hai"	KK	Vishal Dadlani	Hindi	July 29, 2011
7	7	"Tu Hai Yahaan"	KK, Sabri Brothers, Mathangi Rajshekhar, Sanjay Vidyarthi & Lesle Lewis	Prashant Ingole	Hindi	July 29, 2011
Episode 8
8	8	"Jab Se Tere Naina"	Shaan	Sameer	Hindi	August 5, 2011
8	8	"Heiyo Re Heiyo"	Saurav Mandal	Bhatiali	Bengali	August 5, 2011
8	8	"Tum Jo Mil Gaye Ho"	Shaan & Harshdeep Kaur	Kaifi Azmi	Urdu	August 5, 2011
8	8	"Sumbaran Mandal"	Nandesh Umap	Indian Folk	Marathi	August 5, 2011
Episode 9
9	9	"Aaja Sapne Saja Ja"	Kavita Seth & Lesle Lewis	Rajesh Johri & Bharat Bhushan Pant	Hindi	August 12, 2011
9	9	"Coke Studio @ MTV Theme music"	Lesle Lewis	Lesle Lewis	Instrumental	August 12, 2011
9	9	"Kanchi Re"	Benny Dayal & Suzanne D'Mello	Anand Bakshi	Hindi	August 12, 2011
9	9	"Rama Rama Krishna Krishna"	Lesle Lewis & Others	Rajesh Johri	Hindi	August 12, 2011
9	9	"Sunder Balma"	Colonial Cousins & Yachna	Lesle Lewis	Hindi & English	August 12, 2011
9	9	"Udhe Udhe"	Nandesh Umap	Vitthal Umap	Marathi	August 12, 2011
Episode 10: Best of Coke Studio @ MTV season 1
10	10	"Aesian Nighawan / Paluke Bangara"	Bombay Jayashri & Richa Sharma	Anand Raaj Anand, Bhadrachala Ramdas & Noor Jehan	Punjabi & Telugu	August 19, 2011
10	10	"Allah Hi Rehem"	Shankar Mahadevan	Niranjan Iyengar	Hindi	August 19, 2011
10	10	"Bihu Naam (Pak Pak)"	Papon	Traditional Indian	Assamese	August 19, 2011
10	10	"Hey Bhagwan"	Raghu Dixit	Raghu Dixit	Hindi	August 19, 2011
10	10	"Ghir Ghir"	Advaita	Advaita	Hindi	August 19, 2011
10	10	"Tu Mane Ya Na Mane"	Wadali Brothers	R.P. Deewana	Punjabi	August 19, 2011

=== Season 2 (2012) ===
No. overall	No. in season	Song Title	Singer(s)	Lyricist(s)	Language(s)	Original release date
Produced & composed by Clinton Cerejo
11	1	"Saathi Salaam"	Sawan Khan Manganiyar & Clinton Cerejo	Traditional Sindhi & Manoj Yadav	Sindhi & Hindi	July 7, 2012
11	1	"Banjara"	Nandini Srikar & Vijay Prakash	Traditional Indian & Manoj Yadav	Hindi	July 7, 2012
11	1	"Madari"	Vishal Dadlani & Sonu Kakkar	Traditional Indian & Manoj Yadav	Hindi & Punjabi	July 7, 2012
11	1	"Chhadh De"	Master Saleem	Traditional Indian & Manoj Yadav	Hindi	July 7, 2012
11	1	"Mauje Naina"	Altamash Faridi, Bianca Gomes & Shadaab Faridi	Manoj Yadav & Ajinkya Iyer	Hindi & English	July 7, 2012
11	1	"Dungar"	Sawan Khan Manganiyar	Traditional Sindhi & Psalm 61	Sindhi & English	July 7, 2012
Produced & composed by Hitesh Sonik
12	2	"Husna"	Piyush Mishra	Piyush Mishra	Hindi	July 14, 2012
12	2	"Vari Jaun"	Moora Lala & Suman Sridhar	Traditional Indian & Munna Dhiman	Kutchi & Hindi	July 14, 2012
12	2	"Do Gallan"	Alisha Batth & Vijay Prakash	Munna Dhiman	Punjabi & Kannada	July 14, 2012
12	2	"Allah Hoo"	Jyoti Nooran & Sultana Nooran	Traditional Indian	Punjabi	July 14, 2012
12	2	"Hey Ri"	Harshdeep Kaur	Traditional Indian	Hindi	July 14, 2012
12	2	"Lamh Tera"	Raghubir Yadav	Traditional Indian & Raghubir Yadav	Hindi	July 14, 2012
Produced & composed by Amit Trivedi
13	3	"Baari Baari"	Amit Trivedi, Natalie Di Luccio & Shriram Iyer	Shellee	Hindi	July 21, 2012
13	3	"Badri Badariya"	Mame Khan and Mili Nair	Kausar Munir	Hindi & Marwari	July 21, 2012
13	3	"Chaudhary"	Mame Khan	Shellee	Hindi & Marwari	July 21, 2012
13	3	"Nirmohiya"	Harshdeep Kaur & Devender Pal Singh	Amitabh Bhattacharya & Jasleen Bhalla	Punjabi	July 21, 2012
13	3	"Yatra"	Shriram Iyer & Mili Nair	Swanand Kirkire	Hindi	July 21, 2012
Produced & composed by Nitin Sawhney
14	4	"Nadia"	Nicki Wells & Ashwin Srinivasan	Traditional Indian	Hindi & Sanskrit	July 28, 2012
14	4	"Vachan"	Mahesh Vinayakraman, Nicki Wells & Samidha Joglekar	Saroj Sawhney	Hindi	July 28, 2012
14	4	"Sunset"	Nicki Wells & Samidha Joglekar	Nitin Sawhney	Bengali & English	July 28, 2012
14	4	"Saahil Tak"	Ashwin Srinivasan, Papon & Samidha Joglekar	Saroj Sawhney	Hindi	July 28, 2012
14	4	"Longing"	Ashwin Srinivasan, Nicki Wells & Samidha Joglekar	Saroj Sawhney	Hindi & English	July 28, 2012
14	4	"Tere Khayal"	Ashwin Srinivasan, Nicki Wells & Prasad Khaparde	Saroj Sawhney	Hindi	July 28, 2012
Produced & composed by Ehsaan & Loy
15	5	"Subhan Allah"	Jasbir Jassi	Traditional Indian	Punjabi	August 4, 2012
15	5	"Zamana Kharab Hai"	Bhanu Pratap Singh & Dominique Cerejo	Manoj Yadav	Hindi	August 4, 2012
15	5	"Jo Chahenge Voh Karenge"	Benny Dayal	Manoj Yadav	Hindi	August 4, 2012
15	5	"Man Patang Mast Malang"	Mahalakshmi Iyer, Dominique Cerejo, Banjyotsana Borgohain & Sharodee Borah	Ibson Baruah & Manoj Yadav	Assamese & Hindi	August 4, 2012
15	5	"Dil Loche"	Divya Kumar & Mahalakshmi Iyer	Manoj Yadav	Hindi	August 4, 2012
Produced & composed by Karsh Kale
16	6	"Peekaboo"	Apeksha Dandekar, Benny Dayal & Mandeep Sethi	Karsh Kale, Tapan Raj, Mandeep Sethi & Traditional Indian	Hindi & English	August 11, 2012
16	6	"Kajar Bina Kare"	Salim Merchant	Ustad Sultan Khan	Hindi	August 11, 2012
16	6	"Shedding Skin"	Apeksha Dandekar, Karsh Kale, Monali Thakur, Shilpa Rao & Shruti Pathak	Swanand Kirkire & Karsh Kale	Hindi & English	August 11, 2012
16	6	"Glorious"	Benny Dayal, Mandeep Sethi & Shruti Pathak	Shellee & Mandeep Sethi	Arabic, English & Punjabi	August 11, 2012
16	6	"Dil Cheez"	Monali Thakur	Shahryar & Monali Thakur	Hindi & English	August 11, 2012
16	6	"Hallelujah"	Karsh Kale & Shilpa Rao	Karsh Kale, Leonard Cohen & Traditional	Hindi & English	August 11, 2012
Produced & composed by Shantanu Moitra
17	7	"Vandiyil"	La Pongal & Usha Uthup	Traditional Indian & Hari	Tamil	August 18, 2012
17	7	"Khwajababa"	Bonnie Chakraborty & Pranav Biswas	Traditional Indian	Bengali	August 18, 2012
17	7	"Kir Leh Rawh"	Kaushiki Chakrabarty & Mami Varte	David Lalliansanga	Mizo	August 18, 2012
17	7	"Lagi Lagi"	Kaushiki Chakrabarty & Swanand Kirkire	Swanand Kirkire	Hindi	August 18, 2012
17	7	"Pinjra"	Bonnie Chakraborty & Swanand Kirkire	Swanand Kirkire	Hindi	August 18, 2012
Produced & composed by Agam, Dhruv Sangari, Hari & Sukhmani, Jalebee Cartel, Papon and Shilpa Rao
18	8	"Malhar Jam"	Agam	Raag	Hindustani	August 25, 2012
18	8	"Haq Maula"	Dhruv Sangari	Salim Chishti	Hindi	August 25, 2012
18	8	"Dum Dum"	Shilpa Rao & Arun Daga	Shellee	Punjabi	August 25, 2012
18	8	"Tokari"	Papon & Sugandha Garg	Traditional Indian	Assamese	August 25, 2012
18	8	"Challa"	Hari & Sukhmani	Traditional Indian	Punjabi	August 25, 2012
18	8	"Khuda Wohi Hai"	Zila Khan	Traditional Indian	Punjabi	August 25, 2012

=== Season 3 (2013) ===
No. overall	No. in season	Song Title	Singer(s)	Lyricist(s)	Language(s)	Original release date
Produced & composed by A. R. Rahman
21	1	"Aao Balma"	Ustad Ghulam Mustafa Khan, Murtuza Mustafa, Qadir Mustafa, Rabbani Mustafa, Hasan Mustafa & Faiz Mustafa	Traditional Indian	Hindustani	August 17, 2013
21	1	"Ennile Maha Oliyo"	A. R. Rahman, Rayhanah & Issrath	Kutti Revathi	Tamil	August 17, 2013
21	1	"Jagaao Mere Des Ko"	A. R. Rahman, Suchi & Blaaze	Rabindranath Tagore & Prasoon Joshi	Bengali & Hindi	August 17, 2013
21	1	"Naan Yen"	A. R. Rahman & Rayhanah	Valee	Tamil	August 17, 2013
21	1	"Soz O Salaam"	Ustad Ghulam Mustafa Khan, Murtuza Mustafa, Qadir Mustafa, Rabbani Mustafa, Hasan Mustafa & Faiz Mustafa	Traditional Indian	Hindustani	August 17, 2013
21	1	"Zariya"	Ani Choying Drolma & Farah Siraj	Prasoon Joshi, Traditional Buddhist & Jordanian	Hindi	August 17, 2013
Produced & composed by Ram Sampath
22	2	"Aigiri Nandini"	Aruna Sairam & Sona Mohapatra	Traditional Indian & Bulleh Shah	Sanskrit & Punjabi	August 24, 2013
22	2	"Dum Dum Andar"	Sona Mohapatra & Samantha Edwards	Munna Dhiman & Ram Sampath	Rajasthani & English	August 24, 2013
22	2	"Kattey"	Bhanwari Devi & Hard Kaur	Traditional Indian & Hard Kaur	Rajasthani & English	August 24, 2013
22	2	"Paiyada"	Aruna Sairam	Traditional Indian	Telugu	August 24, 2013
22	2	"Piya Se Naina"	Sona Mohapatra	Amir Khusrau	Braj & Hindi	August 24, 2013
22	2	"Sundari Komola"	Usri Banerjee & Aditi Singh Sharma	Traditional Indian & Ram Sampath	Bengali & English	August 24, 2013
Produced & composed by Clinton Cerejo
23	3	"Aisi Bani"	Bianca Gomes, Vijay Prakash & Sonu Kakkar	Manoj Yadav	Rajasthani	August 31, 2013
23	3	"Baina"	Clinton Cerejo & Vijay Prakash	Manoj Yadav	Rajasthani & Hindi	August 31, 2013
23	3	"Kalapi"	Kailash Kher	Manoj Yadav	Rajasthani	August 31, 2013
23	3	"Marghat"	Siddharth Basrur	Manoj Yadav	Rajasthani	August 31, 2013
23	3	"Pinjra"	Jonita Gandhi & Sanam Puri	Manoj Yadav	Braj & Hindi	August 31, 2013
23	3	"Pir Jalani"	Clinton Cerejo & Barmer Boys	Traditional Indian & Manoj Yadav	Rajasthani	August 31, 2013
Produced & composed by Salim–Sulaiman
24	4	"Bismillah"	Kailash Kher & Munnawar Masoom	Irfan Siddiqui	Hindi	September 7, 2013
24	4	"Cheene Re Mora Chain"	Salim Merchant & Ustad Rashid Khan	Shraddha Pandit	Braj & Hindi	September 7, 2013
24	4	"Kare Mann Bhajan"	Salim Merchant	Traditional Indian	Hindi	September 7, 2013
24	4	"Namaste"	Des Raj Lachkani (group) & Shraddha Pandit	Shraddha Pandit & Iqbal	Hindi & Punjabi	September 7, 2013
24	4	"Rudine Rangeeli"	Karsan Sagathia	Traditional Indian	Gujarati	September 7, 2013
24	4	"Sati"	Salim Merchant & Vijay Prakash	Traditional Indian	Sanskrit	September 7, 2013
Produced & composed by Papon
25	5	"Baisara Beera"	Kalpana Patowary & Papon	Traditional Indian	Assamese & Rajasthani	September 14, 2013
25	5	"Benaam Khwaayishein"	Anwesha Datta Gupta	Pinky Poonawala	Hindi	September 14, 2013
25	5	"Dinae Dinae"	Harshdeep Kaur & Papon	Traditional Indian & Jagmeet Bal	Assamese & Punjabi	September 14, 2013
25	5	"Jhumoor"	Dulal Manki & Simanta Shekhar	Traditional Indian	Assamese	September 14, 2013
25	5	"Khumaar"	Papon	Vaibhav Modi	Hindi	September 14, 2013
25	5	"Tauba"	Benny Dayal	Vaibhav Modi	Hindi	September 14, 2013
Produced & composed by Amit Trivedi
26	6	"Khari Khari"	Kavita Seth & Kutle Khan	Shellee	Punjabi	September 21, 2013
26	6	"Kyun Na"	Chandana Bala, Dhruv Sangari & Karthik	Ozil Dalal	Hindi	September 21, 2013
26	6	"Naariyan"	Karthik & Shalmali Kholgade	Kausar Munir	Hindi	September 21, 2013
26	6	"Rabba"	Tochi Raina & Jaggi	Anusha Mani & Jaggi (rap)	Hindi & Punjabi	September 21, 2013
26	6	"Sheher"	Amit Trivedi & Tanvi Shah	Swanand Kirkire	Hindi	September 21, 2013
Produced & composed by Hitesh Sonik
27	7	"Chan Kitthan"	Sukhwinder Singh	Traditional Indian	Punjabi	September 28, 2013
27	7	"Ghar"	Piyush Mishra	Piyush Mishra	Hindi	September 28, 2013
27	7	"Haal Ve Rabba"	Hans Raj Hans & Shruti Pathak	Traditional Indian	Punjabi	September 28, 2013
27	7	"Maajhi"	Sukhwinder Singh	Luv Ranjan	Hindi & English	September 28, 2013
27	7	"Moh"	Sanjeev Abhyankar & Nikhil D'Souza	Kabir & Nikhil D'Souza	Hindi	September 28, 2013
27	7	"Ramaiyya"	Sunidhi Chauhan	Mirabai	Braj & Hindi	September 28, 2013
Produced & composed by Aditya Balani, Func., Orange Street, Sonam Kalra, Vijay Prakash & Winit Tikoo
28	8	"Anth Bahar"	Aditya Bhasin, Kutle Khan, Bismila Khan & Nancy Aren Ao	Bulleh Shah	Punjabi	October 5, 2013
28	8	"Man Manam"	Sonam Kalra	Pinky Poonawala	Farsi	October 5, 2013
28	8	"Naash"	Anirban Chakraborty & Imran Khan	Hazrat Shah Niyaz Barelvi	Hindi & English	October 5, 2013
28	8	"Paagal"	Winit Tikoo	Winit Tikoo	Hindi	October 5, 2013
28	8	"Qalandar"	Suhail Yusuf Khan	Suhail Yusuf Khan	Hindi	October 5, 2013
28	8	"Vyakul Jiyara"	Vijay Prakash & Hamsika Iyer	Manoj Yadav	Hindi	October 5, 2013

=== Season 4 (2015) ===
No. overall	No. in season	Song Title	Singer(s)	Lyricist(s)	Language(s)	Original release date
Produced & composed by Amit Trivedi
26	1	"Teriyaan Tu Jaane"	Amit Trivedi, Harshdeep Kaur & Jyoti Nooran	Irshad Kamil	Hindi & Punjabi	March 1, 2015
Produced & composed by Sachin – Jigar
27	2	"Laadki"	Kirtidan Gadhvi, Rekha Bhardwaj & Taniskha Sanghvi	Gujarati Folk & Priya Saraiya	Hindi & Gujarati	April 12, 2015
27	2	"Sawan Mein"	Divya Kumar & Jasmine Sandlas	Mayur Puri	Braj & Hindi	April 12, 2015
27	2	"Bannado"	Bhungarkhan Manganiar & Tochi Raina	Rajasthani Folk & Priya Suraiya	Hindi & Marwari	April 12, 2015
Produced & composed by Dhruv Ghanekar
28	3	"Nimoli"	Bobkat & Ila Arun	Bobkat & Ila Arun	English & Rajasthani	June 7, 2015
28	3	"Ae Rab"	Dhruv Ghanekar & Master Saleem	Bulleh Shah & Ishitta Arun	Hindi & Punjabi	June 7, 2015
28	3	"Birha"	Dhruv Ghanekar, Kalpana Patowary & Sonia Saigal	Kalpana Patowary, Sonia Saigal & Dhruv Ghanekar	Bhojpuri & English	June 7, 2015
Produced & composed by Ram Sampath
29	4	"Rangabati"	Sona Mohapatra, Rituraj Mohanty & Dopeadelicz	Odisha Folk, Mitrabhanu Guintia & Dopeadelicz	Odia & Tamil	July 5, 2015
29	4	"Chadh Chadha Jana"	Bhanvari Devi & Krishna Kumar Buddha Ram	Rajasthani Folk & Munna Dhiman	Hindi & Rajasthani	July 5, 2015
29	4	"Anhad Naad"	Sona Mohapatra & Shadaab Faridi	Munna Dhiman	Braj & Hindi	July 5, 2015
29	4	"Bharatiyar Trap Rap"	Vidya Harikrishna, Tony Sebastian, Rajesh Radhakrishnan & Viveick Rajgopalan	Bharatiyar, Rajesh Radhakrishnan & Viveick Rajgopalan	Carnatic & Tamil	July 5, 2015
Produced & composed by Jatinder Shah, Salim–Sulaiman, Manj Musik and Sunny Brown
30	5	"Ki Banu Duniya Da"	Diljit Dosanjh, Gurdas Maan & Jatinder Shah	Gurdas Maan	Punjabi	August 15, 2015
30	5	"Peer Manaawan Challiyaan"	Salim Merchant, Sukhwinder Singh & Raj Pandit	Sukhwinder Singh	Punjabi	August 15, 2015
30	5	"Allah Veh"	Jashan Singh, Manj Musik & Raftaar	Big Dhillon & Raftaar	Hindi & Punjabi	August 15, 2015
Produced & composed by Anupam Roy & Jeet Gannguli
31	6	"I Wanna Fly"	Anupam Roy, Sharmilee Supriyo & Babul Supriyo	Anupam Roy, Babul Supriyo & Javed Akhtar	Hindi & English	October 4, 2015
31	6	"Moner Manush"	Anupam Roy, Satyaki Banerjee, Babul Supriyo	Lalon Fakir & Anupam Roy	Bengali & Hindi	October 4, 2015
31	6	"Jhelum Naina"	Jeet Gannguli & Babul Supriyo	Prasoon Joshi	Hindi	October 4, 2015

== Coke Music Live ==
No. overall	No. in season	Song Title	Singer(s)	Lyricist(s)	Composer(s)	Original release date
1	1	"Memu Aagamu"	Armaan Malik, Tri.be & Lost Stories	Kunaal Vermaa, ELLY & S.TIGER	Lost Stories & ELLY	22 August 2022

== Coke Studio Tamil ==
=== Season 1 (2023) ===
No. overall	No. in season	Song Title	Artist(s)	Lyricist(s)	Composer(s)	Original release date
-	-	"Idhu Namma Isai"	M Lalitha Sudha, Meha, Sean Roldan	Ba. Murali Krishnan & Sean Roldan	Sean Roldan	23 January 2023
1	1	"Sagavaasi"	Arivu & Khatija Rahman	Arivu	Arivu	1 February 2023
2	2	"Vendum"	Sean Roldan & Meenakshi Elayaraja	Sean Roldan	Sean Roldan	6 March 2023
3	3	"Tamizhi"	Pushpavanam Kuppusamy & ofRo	Ashwin Samynathan, ofRo, Pushpavanam Kuppusamy, Urban Thozha & Vishnu Edavan	ofRo, Pushpavanam Kuppusamy & Sean Roldan	6 April 2023
4	4	"Kan Moodudho"	Chinmayi Sripaada & John Pradeep JL	Kaber Vasuki	Sean Roldan	4 May 2023
5	5	"Urudhi"	Sanjay Subrahmanyan & Arifullah Shah Rafaee	Krithika Nelson	Sean Roldan	23 May 2023
6	6	"Daavula Darling"	Gaana Vimala & Kalaimamani Gaana Ulaganathan	Kalaimamani Gaana Ulaganathan	Kalaimamani Gaana Ulaganathan	21 June 2023
7	7	"Puzhudhi"	Jhanu, Muthu & Mutthammaal	Jayamkondar, Muthu & Mutthammaal	Jhanu	27 July 2023

=== Season 2 (2024) ===
No. overall	No. in season	Song Title	Artist(s)	Lyricist(s)	Composer(s)	Original release date
-	-	"Idhu Semma Vibe"	Sean Roldan & El Fé Choir by Roe Vincent	Sean Roldan	Sean Roldan	20 December 2023
8	1	"Kaakarattan"	Vidya Vox & Rajalakshmi Senthilganesan	Yugabharathi	G. V. Prakash Kumar	3 January 2024
9	2	"Please Purinjukko"	Aditi Rao Hydari & Sean Roldan	Sean Roldan & Vignesh Shivan	Sean Roldan	31 January 2024
10	3	"Elay Makka"	Andrea Jeremiah, Girishh G, Navz-47, Sanjay Subrahmanyan & Sathyaprakash	Mohan Rajan & Navz-47	Girishh G	21 February 2024
11	4	"Roar-a Yethu"	Arunraja Kamaraj, Sean Roldan & Vijay Sethupathi	Arunraja Kamaraj	Sean Roldan	13 March 2024
12	5	"Thamizh Vaazhthu"	Arivu & The Ambassa Band	Bharathiyar, Madurai Ilangumaranar & Thiruvalluvar	Arivu	10 April 2024
13	6	"Oh Hoi"	Benny Dayal, Mullai Kalai Kuzhu, Arivu & Sean Roldan	Arivu	Sean Roldan & Arivu	20 May 2024
14	7	"Kalyana Kacheri"	Kapil Kapilan, Sithara Krishnakumar	Karthik Netha	Justin Prabhakaran	16 June 2024

== Coke Studio Bharat ==
=== Season 1 (2023) ===
No. overall	No. in season	Song Title	Artist (s)	Lyricist (s)	Composer (s)	Original release date
1	1	"Udja"	Burrah, Jasleen Royal & Savera Mehta	Burrah & Kausar Munir	OAFF & Savera	February 7, 2023
2	2	"Holi Re Rasiya"	Mahan, Maithili Thakur, Seedhe Maut & Ravi Kishan	Kausar Munir & Seedhe Maut	Mahan Sehgal & Ankur Tewari	February 21, 2023
3	3	"Taqdeer"	Donn Bhat, Rashmeet Kaur, Prabh Deep & Sakur Khan	Bulleh Shah, Prabh Deep & Sindhi Folk	Donn Bhat, Rashmeet Kaur & Prabh Deep	March 24, 2023
4	4	"Das Main Ki Pyaar Vichon Khatteya"	Amira Gill, Deveshi Sahgal, Kanwar Grewal, Tajdar Junaid & Vijay Yamla Jatt	Kausar Munir & Lal Chand Yamla Jatt	Tajdar Junaid	May 9, 2023
5	5	"Kya Karie Korimol"	Alif, Aashima Mahajan & Noor Mohammad	Alif	Alif	May 25, 2023
6	6	"Geejaga Hakki"	Sanjith Hegde & Prassannakumar Hegde	Nagarjun Sharma & Sanjith Hegde	Sanjith Hegde	June 8, 2023
7	7	"Khalasi"	Aditya Gadhvi & Achint Thakkar	Saumya Joshi	Achint Thakkar	July 5, 2023
8	8	"Maria"	Mansa, Osho Jain, Bombay Brass & Shillong Chamber Choir	Javed Akhtar & R. D. Burman	Arijit Datta & Rhys Sebastian	October 9, 2023

=== Season 2 (2024) ===
No. overall	No. in season	Song Title	Artist (s)	Lyricist (s)	Composer (s)	Original release date
9	1	"Magic"	Diljit Dosanjh & The Quickstyle	Chani Nattan	Inderpal Moga	February 9, 2024
-	-	"Holi Re Rasiya"	Mahan, Maithili Thakur, Seedhe Maut & Ravi Kishan	Kausar Munir & Seedhe Maut	Mahan Sehgal & Ankur Tewari	March 7, 2024
10	2	"Chirmathi"	MC Square & Mohito ft. Karsh Kale	MC Square & Mohito	Hashbass, MC Square & Mohito	April 2, 2024
11	3	"Sonchadi"	digV, Neha Kakkar & Kamala Devi	Lavraj, Kausar Munir & Swanand Kirkire	digV	May 8, 2024
12	4	"Leta Jaijo Re"	Chotu Khan, Shashwat Sachdev & Sunidhi Chauhan	Rajasthani Folk & Kausar Munir	Shashwat Sachdev	June 26, 2024
13	5	"Bayo"	Cyli Khare, Komorebi & Srushti Tawade	Cyli Khare	Komorebi	August 12, 2024
14	6	"Re Mann"	Kanishk Seth, Shreya Ghoshal & Swanand Kirkire	Swanand Kirkire	Swanand Kirkire	October 15, 2024

=== Season 3 (2025) ===
No. overall	No. in season	Song Title	Artist (s)	Lyricist (s)	Composer (s)	Original release date
15	1	"Holi Aayi Re"	Vishal Mishra, Malini Awasthi & Prateeksha Srivastava	Kaushal Kishore & Vishal Mishra	Vishal Mishra	February 21, 2025
16	2	"Holo Lolo"	Shankuraj Konwar & Shalmali Kholgade	Himanshu Sutiya Saikia (Assamese) & Shloke Lal (Hindi)	Shankuraj Konwar	February 26, 2025
17	3	"Punjab Vekh Ke"	Gulab Sidhu, Jassa Dhillon, Raaginder & Thiarajxtt	Jassa Dhillon & Mehak Sidhu	Mehak Sidhu	April 23, 2025
18	4	"Ishq Bawla"	Dhanda Nyoliwala & Xvir Grewal	Dhanda Nyoliwala	Dhanda Nyoliwala	June 18, 2025
19	5	"Arz Kiya Hai"	Anuv Jain & Lost Stories	Anuv Jain	Anuv Jain	August 19, 2025
20	6	"Meetha Khaara"	Aditya Gadhvi & Madhubanti Bagchi	Aditya Gadhvi	Siddharth Amit Bhavsar	September 9, 2025
21	7	"Thalaivan Oruvan"	Santhosh Narayanan, ofRO, SVDP & The Indian Choral Ensemble	Vivek & SVDP	Santhosh Narayanan	October 29, 2025
22	8	"Novala"	Jayamoorthy, Dabzee & Santhosh Narayanan	Vivek & Dabzee	Santhosh Narayanan	October 29, 2025

=== Season 4 (2026) ===
No. overall	No. in season	Song Title	Artist (s)	Lyricist (s)	Composer (s)	Original release date
23	1	"Ae Ajnabee"	Aditya Rikhari, Ravator & Kutle Khan	Aditya Rikhari & Kutle Khan	Aditya Rikhari, Ravator & Kutle Khan	March 18, 2026
24	2	"Bulleya Ve"	Madhur Sharma, Ashok Maskeen & Swarit Shukl	Pankaj Saini	Madhur Sharma	April 15, 2026
25	3	"Kachaudi Gali"	Khwaab, Rekha Bhardwaj & Utpal Udit	Traditional Indian	Khwaab	May 20, 2026
26	4	"Hoor"	Faheem Abdullah, Arsalan Nizami & Qaiser Nizami	Qaiser Nizami & Syed Mehdi Razvi	Faheem Abdullah & Arsalan Nizami	July 1, 2026

== See also ==
- MTV Unplugged
- Coke Studio Pakistan
- Coke Studio Bangla
