= Coke Studio @ MTV season 3 =

Season of television series

Coke Studio @ MTV
- Season 3
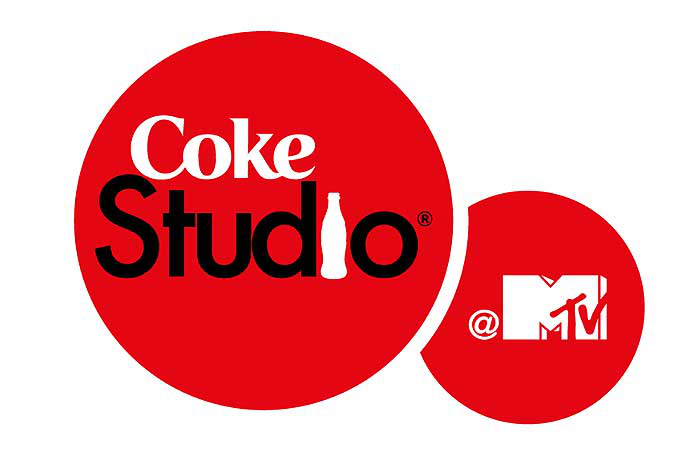
- Starring: Vocalists
- No. of episodes: 8

Release
- Original network: MTV India; DD National; YouTube
- Original release: August 17 – October 19, 2013

Season chronology
- ← Previous; Season 2 Next → Season 4

The third season of the Indian music television series, Coke Studio @ MTV, aired between 17 August 2013, and 29 October 2013. Encompassing eight original episodes and two retrospective "Best of Coke Studio @ MTV Season 3" episodes, the season presented a total of 47 songs.

== Artists ==
=== Vocalists ===
- A. R. Rahman
- Adi & Suhail
- Aditi Singh Sharma
- Aditya Bhasin
- Amit Trivedi
- Ani Choying Drolma
- Anirban Chakraborty
- Anwesha Datta Gupta
- Aruna Sairam
- Benny Dayal
- Bhanvari Devi
- Bianca Gomes
- Bismila Khan
- Clinton Cerejo
- Des Raj Lachkani (group)
- Dhruv Sangari
- Dulal Manki
- Faiz Mustafa
- Farah Siraj
- Gaurav Balani
- Hamsika Iyer
- Hans Raj Hans
- Hard Kaur
- Harshdeep Kaur
- Hasan Mustafa
- Imran Khan
- Jaggi
- Jonita Gandhi
- Kailash Kher
- Kalpana Patowary
- Karsan Sagathia
- Karthik
- Chandana Bala
- Kavita Seth
- Kutle Khan
- Mangey 'Manga' Khan (Barmer Boys)
- Munawar Masoom
- Murtuza Mustafa
- Nancy Aren Ao
- Nikhil D' Souza
- Papon
- Piyush Mishra
- Pt. Sanjeev Abhyankar
- Qadir Mustafa
- Rabbani Mustafa
- Rayhanah & Issrath
- Salim–Sulaiman
- Samantha Edwards
- Sanam Puri
- Shalmali Kholgade
- Shraddha Pandit
- Shruti Pathak
- Siddarth Basrur
- Simanta Shekhar
- Sona Mohapatra
- Sonam Kalra
- Sonu Kakkar
- Suchi & Blaaze
- Sukhwinder Singh
- Sunidhi Chauhan
- Tanvi Shah
- Tarun
- Tochi Raina
- Usri Banerjee
- Ustad Ghulam Mustafa Khan
- Ustad Rashid Khan
- Vijay Prakash
- Winit Tikoo

== Production ==
The season was produced and broadcast by Viacom18 in collaboration with Coca-Cola India. Chandrashekhar L served as Creative Director and Producer, while Parichit Paralkar designed the production. Joel Pinto directed the Behind the Music (BTM) segments. David Polycarp and Vasant Valsan oversaw production, with Sony Music India acting as the official music partner.

The season adopted the format established in the previous season, featuring episodes produced by individual music producers, culminating in a final episode with collaborative efforts from multiple producers. The music producers for this season included (listed alphabetically):

- A. R. Rahman
- Aditya Balani
- Amit Trivedi
- Clinton Cerejo
- Func.
- Hitesh Sonik
- Orange Street
- Papon
- Ram Sampath
- Salim–Sulaiman
- Sonam Kalra
- Vijay Prakash
- Winit Tikoo

== Episodes ==
| No. overall | No. in season | Song Title | Singer(s) | Lyricist(s) | Language(s) | Original release date |
|---|---|---|---|---|---|---|
Produced & composed by A. R. Rahman
| 21 | 1 | "Aao Balma" | Ustad Ghulam Mustafa Khan, Murtuza Mustafa, Qadir Mustafa, Rabbani Mustafa, Hasan Mustafa & Faiz Mustafa | Traditional Indian | Hindustani | August 17, 2013 |
| 21 | 1 | "Ennile Maha Oliyo" | A. R. Rahman, Rayhanah & Issrath | Kutti Revathi | Tamil | August 17, 2013 |
| 21 | 1 | "Jagaao Mere Des Ko" | A. R. Rahman, Suchi & Blaaze | Rabindranath Tagore & Prasoon Joshi | Bengali & Hindi | August 17, 2013 |
| 21 | 1 | "Naan Yen" | A. R. Rahman & Rayhanah | Valee | Tamil | August 17, 2013 |
| 21 | 1 | "Soz O Salaam" | Ustad Ghulam Mustafa Khan, Murtuza Mustafa, Qadir Mustafa, Rabbani Mustafa, Hasan Mustafa & Faiz Mustafa | Traditional Indian | Hindustani | August 17, 2013 |
| 21 | 1 | "Zariya" | Ani Choying Drolma & Farah Siraj | Prasoon Joshi, Traditional Buddhist & Jordanian | Hindi | August 17, 2013 |
Produced & composed by Ram Sampath
| 22 | 2 | "Aigiri Nandini" | Aruna Sairam & Sona Mohapatra | Traditional Indian & Bulleh Shah | Sanskrit & Punjabi | August 24, 2013 |
| 22 | 2 | "Dum Dum Andar" | Sona Mohapatra & Samantha Edwards | Munna Dhiman & Ram Sampath | Rajasthani & English | August 24, 2013 |
| 22 | 2 | "Kattey" | Bhanwari Devi & Hard Kaur | Traditional Indian & Hard Kaur | Rajasthani & English | August 24, 2013 |
| 22 | 2 | "Paiyada" | Aruna Sairam | Traditional Indian | Telugu | August 24, 2013 |
| 22 | 2 | "Piya Se Naina" | Sona Mohapatra | Amir Khusrau | Braj & Hindi | August 24, 2013 |
| 22 | 2 | "Sundari Komola" | Usri Banerjee & Aditi Singh Sharma | Traditional Indian & Ram Sampath | Bengali & English | August 24, 2013 |
Produced & composed by Clinton Cerejo
| 23 | 3 | "Aisi Bani" | Bianca Gomes, Vijay Prakash & Sonu Kakkar | Manoj Yadav | Rajasthani | August 31, 2013 |
| 23 | 3 | "Baina" | Clinton Cerejo & Vijay Prakash | Manoj Yadav | Rajasthani & Hindi | August 31, 2013 |
| 23 | 3 | "Kalapi" | Kailash Kher | Manoj Yadav | Rajasthani | August 31, 2013 |
| 23 | 3 | "Marghat" | Siddharth Basrur | Manoj Yadav | Rajasthani | August 31, 2013 |
| 23 | 3 | "Pinjra" | Jonita Gandhi & Sanam Puri | Manoj Yadav | Braj & Hindi | August 31, 2013 |
| 23 | 3 | "Pir Jalani" | Clinton Cerejo & Barmer Boys | Traditional Indian & Manoj Yadav | Rajasthani | August 31, 2013 |
Produced & composed by Salim–Sulaiman
| 24 | 4 | "Bismillah" | Kailash Kher & Munnawar Masoom | Irfan Siddiqui | Hindi | September 7, 2013 |
| 24 | 4 | "Cheene Re Mora Chain" | Salim Merchant & Ustad Rashid Khan | Shraddha Pandit | Braj & Hindi | September 7, 2013 |
| 24 | 4 | "Kare Mann Bhajan" | Salim Merchant | Traditional Indian | Hindi | September 7, 2013 |
| 24 | 4 | "Namaste" | Des Raj Lachkani (group) & Shraddha Pandit | Shraddha Pandit & Iqbal | Hindi & Punjabi | September 7, 2013 |
| 24 | 4 | "Rudine Rangeeli" | Karsan Sagathia | Traditional Indian | Gujarati | September 7, 2013 |
| 24 | 4 | "Sati" | Salim Merchant & Vijay Prakash | Traditional Indian | Sanskrit | September 7, 2013 |
Produced & composed by Papon
| 25 | 5 | "Baisara Beera" | Kalpana Patowary & Papon | Traditional Indian | Assamese & Rajasthani | September 14, 2013 |
| 25 | 5 | "Benaam Khwaayishein" | Anwesha Datta Gupta | Pinky Poonawala | Hindi | September 14, 2013 |
| 25 | 5 | "Dinae Dinae" | Harshdeep Kaur & Papon | Traditional Indian & Jagmeet Bal | Assamese & Punjabi | September 14, 2013 |
| 25 | 5 | "Jhumoor" | Dulal Manki & Simanta Shekhar | Traditional Indian | Assamese | September 14, 2013 |
| 25 | 5 | "Khumaar" | Papon | Vaibhav Modi | Hindi | September 14, 2013 |
| 25 | 5 | "Tauba" | Benny Dayal | Vaibhav Modi | Hindi | September 14, 2013 |
Produced & composed by Amit Trivedi
| 26 | 6 | "Khari Khari" | Kavita Seth & Kutle Khan | Shellee | Punjabi | September 21, 2013 |
| 26 | 6 | "Kyun Na" | Chandana Bala, Dhruv Sangari & Karthik | Ozil Dalal | Hindi | September 21, 2013 |
| 26 | 6 | "Naariyan" | Karthik & Shalmali Kholgade | Kausar Munir | Hindi | September 21, 2013 |
| 26 | 6 | "Rabba" | Tochi Raina & Jaggi | Anusha Mani & Jaggi (rap) | Hindi & Punjabi | September 21, 2013 |
| 26 | 6 | "Sheher" | Amit Trivedi & Tanvi Shah | Swanand Kirkire | Hindi | September 21, 2013 |
Produced & composed by Hitesh Sonik
| 27 | 7 | "Chan Kitthan" | Sukhwinder Singh | Traditional Indian | Punjabi | September 28, 2013 |
| 27 | 7 | "Ghar" | Piyush Mishra | Piyush Mishra | Hindi | September 28, 2013 |
| 27 | 7 | "Haal Ve Rabba" | Hans Raj Hans & Shruti Pathak | Traditional Indian | Punjabi | September 28, 2013 |
| 27 | 7 | "Maajhi" | Sukhwinder Singh | Luv Ranjan | Hindi & English | September 28, 2013 |
| 27 | 7 | "Moh" | Sanjeev Abhyankar & Nikhil D'Souza | Kabir & Nikhil D'Souza | Hindi | September 28, 2013 |
| 27 | 7 | "Ramaiyya" | Sunidhi Chauhan | Mirabai | Braj & Hindi | September 28, 2013 |
Produced & composed by Aditya Balani, Func., Orange Street, Sonam Kalra, Vijay Prakash & Winit Tikoo
| 28 | 8 | "Anth Bahar" | Aditya Bhasin, Kutle Khan, Bismila Khan & Nancy Aren Ao | Bulleh Shah | Punjabi | October 5, 2013 |
| 28 | 8 | "Man Manam" | Sonam Kalra | Pinky Poonawala | Farsi | October 5, 2013 |
| 28 | 8 | "Naash" | Anirban Chakraborty & Imran Khan | Hazrat Shah Niyaz Barelvi | Hindi & English | October 5, 2013 |
| 28 | 8 | "Paagal" | Winit Tikoo | Winit Tikoo | Hindi | October 5, 2013 |
| 28 | 8 | "Qalandar" | Suhail Yusuf Khan | Suhail Yusuf Khan | Hindi | October 5, 2013 |
| 28 | 8 | "Vyakul Jiyara" | Vijay Prakash & Hamsika Iyer | Manoj Yadav | Hindi | October 5, 2013 |
