= Coke Studio Bharat =

Indian music series

- Starring: Featured Artists
- Country of origin: India
- No. of seasons: 4
- No. of episodes: 25 (list of episodes)

Production
- Executive producer: Universal Music India
- Production location: India
- Camera setup: Multi-camera
- Running time: 3–6 minutes
- Production companies: Colosceum; EO2 EXP

Original release
- Network: YouTube; JioCinema
- Release: February 7, 2023 – present

Related
- Coke Studio Tamil

Coke Studio Bharat is an Indian music series, and a part of the international franchise, Coke Studio. It features live studio recordings by various artists, showcasing a diverse range of music. This includes classical genres from India like Hindustani, Carnatic, Indian folk, alongside hip hop, rock, and pop music.

The first season premiered on 7 February 2023, and concluded its run on 9 October 2023. Ankur Tewari helmed the curation, alongside the collaboration of poet and lyricist Kausar Munir and music producer K. J. Singh. The second season began airing on 9 February 2024. Ankur Tewari serves as the season's curator, while music supervision is handled by Universal Music India. The first track of Season 3 dropped on 21 February 2025, following the departure of ‘creative architect’ and curator Ankur Tewari after the first two seasons; the A&R team at Universal Music India took over the curation of Season 3.

== Origins ==
Eight years after its last season aired on MTV India, Coke Studio returned to the Indian music scene in February 2023. Spearheaded by Coca-Cola India, this revival was named Coke Studio Bharat. The reintroduction hinted at a shift towards celebrating India's diverse musical heritage. Coke Studio Bharat aimed to contemporize the show by facilitating fresh collaborations among various artists. Unlike its previous partnership with MTV India, this edition focused exclusively on digital platforms, with individual songs released instead of full episodes. Despite these format changes, Coke Studio Bharat stayed true to the show's essence—showcasing unique artist pairings accompanied by a house band and additional musicians.

== Featured artists ==
=== Season 1's vocalists ===
- Aditya Gadhvi
- Achint Thakkar
- Aashima Mahajan
- Alif
- Amira Gill
- Bombay Brass
- Burrah
- Deveshi Sahgal
- Donn Bhat
- Jasleen Royal
- Kanwar Grewal
- Mahan
- Mansa
- Maithili Thakur
- Noor Mohammad
- Osho Jain
- Prabh Deep
- Prassannakumar Hegde
- Ravi Kishan
- Rashmeet Kaur
- Sakur Khan
- Sanjith Hegde
- Savera Mehta
- Seedhe Maut
- Shillong Chamber Choir
- Tajdar Junaid
- Vijay Yamla Jatt

=== Season 2's vocalists ===
- Chotu Khan
- Cyli Khare
- digV
- Diljit Dosanjh
- Kamala Devi
- Mahan
- Maithili Thakur
- MC Square
- Mohito
- Neha Kakkar
- Ravi Kishan
- Seedhe Maut
- Shashwat Sachdev
- Shreya Ghoshal
- Srushti Tawade
- Sunidhi Chauhan
- Swanand Kirkire

=== Season 3's vocalists ===
- Anuv Jain
- Aditya Gadhvi
- Dhanda Nyoliwala
- Gulab Sidhu
- Jassa Dhillon
- Madhubanti Bagchi
- Malini Awasthi
- Prateeksha Srivastava
- Shalmali Kholgade
- Shankuraj Konwar
- Siddharth Amit Bhavsar
- Thanu Khan
- Vishal Mishra
- Xvir Grewal

== Songs ==
=== Series overview ===
Season	Episodes	Originally released		
Season	Episodes	First released	Last released	Network
1	8	February 7, 2023	October 9, 2023	YouTube
2	6	February 9, 2024	October 24, 2024	JioCinema & YouTube
3	8	February 21, 2025	October 29, 2025	YouTube
4	3	March 18, 2026	present	YouTube

=== Season 1 (2023) ===
No. overall	No. in season	Song Title	Artist (s)	Lyricist (s)	Composer (s)	Original release date
1	1	"Udja"	Burrah, Jasleen Royal & Savera Mehta	Burrah & Kausar Munir	OAFF & Savera	February 7, 2023
2	2	"Holi Re Rasiya"	Mahan, Maithili Thakur, Seedhe Maut & Ravi Kishan	Kausar Munir & Seedhe Maut	Mahan Sehgal & Ankur Tewari	February 21, 2023
3	3	"Taqdeer"	Donn Bhat, Rashmeet Kaur, Prabh Deep & Sakur Khan	Bulleh Shah, Prabh Deep & Sindhi Folk	Donn Bhat, Rashmeet Kaur & Prabh Deep	March 24, 2023
4	4	"Das Main Ki Pyaar Vichon Khatteya"	Amira Gill, Deveshi Sahgal, Kanwar Grewal, Tajdar Junaid & Vijay Yamla Jatt	Kausar Munir & Lal Chand Yamla Jatt	Tajdar Junaid	May 9, 2023
5	5	"Kya Karie Korimol"	Alif, Aashima Mahajan & Noor Mohammad	Alif	Alif	May 25, 2023
6	6	"Geejaga Hakki"	Sanjith Hegde & Prassannakumar Hegde	Nagarjun Sharma & Sanjith Hegde	Sanjith Hegde	June 8, 2023
7	7	"Khalasi"	Aditya Gadhvi & Achint Thakkar	Saumya Joshi	Achint Thakkar	July 5, 2023
8	8	"Maria"	Mansa, Osho Jain, Bombay Brass & Shillong Chamber Choir	Javed Akhtar & R. D. Burman	Arijit Datta & Rhys Sebastian	October 9, 2023

=== Season 2 (2024) ===
No. overall	No. in season	Song Title	Artist (s)	Lyricist (s)	Composer (s)	Original release date
9	1	"Magic"	Diljit Dosanjh & The Quickstyle	Chani Nattan	Inderpal Moga	February 9, 2024
-	-	"Holi Re Rasiya"	Mahan, Maithili Thakur, Seedhe Maut & Ravi Kishan	Kausar Munir & Seedhe Maut	Mahan Sehgal & Ankur Tewari	March 7, 2024
10	2	"Chirmathi"	MC Square & Mohito ft. Karsh Kale	MC Square & Mohito	Hashbass, MC Square & Mohito	April 2, 2024
11	3	"Sonchadi"	digV, Neha Kakkar & Kamala Devi	Lavraj, Kausar Munir & Swanand Kirkire	digV	May 8, 2024
12	4	"Leta Jaijo Re"	Chotu Khan, Shashwat Sachdev & Sunidhi Chauhan	Rajasthani Folk & Kausar Munir	Shashwat Sachdev	June 26, 2024
13	5	"Bayo"	Cyli Khare, Komorebi & Srushti Tawade	Cyli Khare	Komorebi	August 12, 2024
14	6	"Re Mann"	Kanishk Seth, Shreya Ghoshal & Swanand Kirkire	Swanand Kirkire	Swanand Kirkire	October 15, 2024

=== Season 3 (2025) ===
No. overall	No. in season	Song Title	Artist (s)	Lyricist (s)	Composer (s)	Original release date
15	1	"Holi Aayi Re"	Vishal Mishra, Malini Awasthi & Prateeksha Srivastava	Kaushal Kishore & Vishal Mishra	Vishal Mishra	February 21, 2025
16	2	"Holo Lolo"	Shankuraj Konwar & Shalmali Kholgade	Himanshu Sutiya Saikia (Assamese) & Shloke Lal (Hindi)	Shankuraj Konwar	February 26, 2025
17	3	"Punjab Vekh Ke"	Gulab Sidhu, Jassa Dhillon, Raaginder & Thiarajxtt	Jassa Dhillon & Mehak Sidhu	Mehak Sidhu	April 23, 2025
18	4	"Ishq Bawla"	Dhanda Nyoliwala & Xvir Grewal	Dhanda Nyoliwala	Dhanda Nyoliwala	June 18, 2025
19	5	"Arz Kiya Hai"	Anuv Jain & Lost Stories	Anuv Jain	Anuv Jain	August 19, 2025
20	6	"Meetha Khaara"	Aditya Gadhvi & Madhubanti Bagchi	Aditya Gadhvi	Siddharth Amit Bhavsar	September 9, 2025
21	7	"Thalaivan Oruvan"	Santhosh Narayanan, ofRO, SVDP & The Indian Choral Ensemble	Vivek & SVDP	Santhosh Narayanan	October 29, 2025
22	8	"Novala"	Jayamoorthy, Dabzee & Santhosh Narayanan	Vivek & Dabzee	Santhosh Narayanan	October 29, 2025

=== Season 4 (2026) ===
No. overall	No. in season	Song Title	Artist (s)	Lyricist (s)	Composer (s)	Original release date
23	1	"Ae Ajnabee"	Aditya Rikhari, Ravator & Kutle Khan	Aditya Rikhari & Kutle Khan	Aditya Rikhari, Ravator & Kutle Khan	March 18, 2026
24	2	"Bulleya Ve"	Madhur Sharma, Ashok Maskeen & Swarit Shukl	Pankaj Saini	Madhur Sharma	April 15, 2026
25	3	"Kachaudi Gali"	Khwaab, Rekha Bhardwaj & Utpal Udit	Traditional Indian	Khwaab	May 20, 2026
26	4	"Hoor"	Faheem Abdullah, Arsalan Nizami & Qaiser Nizami	Qaiser Nizami & Syed Mehdi Razvi	Faheem Abdullah & Arsalan Nizami	July 1, 2026

== Production ==
=== Season 1 (2023) ===
The first season was curated by Ankur Tewari, who collaborated with poet and lyricist Kausar Munir and music producer K. J. Singh. Colosceum Media Pvt Ltd managed the visual aspect of the production, while Misfits Inc oversaw audio production. Universal Music India served as the season's executive producer and official distributor.

=== Season 2 (2024) ===
The second season was conceived and produced by Ankur Tewari, with the support of a think tank team comprising Kausar Munir, Swanand Kirkire, and K.J. Singh. Mr. Singh additionally served as the Sound and Technical Supervisor. Additional A&R support was provided by Misfits Inc. Universal Music India was responsible for music supervision, marketing, distribution, and overall production management. Video production was managed by Colosceum, with Lalit Prem Sharma as the producer.

== Reception ==
The first season's music has generated a spectrum of critical and audience reception. Prime Minister of India Narendra Modi praised singer Aditya Gadhvi for his chart-topping song "Khalasi," which had gained widespread acclaim since its release by Coke Studio Bharat in July 2023. Industrialist Harsh Goenka also expressed his admiration for "Khalasi" despite not understanding the lyrics, highlighting the song's universal appeal. The song's popularity even led to a Hindi version being created by musician Jesus Mehta.

== See also ==
- Coke Studio Tamil
- Coke Studio Bangla
- Coke Studio Pakistan
