= Coke Studio Tamil =

Indian music series

- Starring: Featured Artists
- Country of origin: India
- Original language: Tamil
- No. of seasons: 2
- No. of episodes: 14 (list of episodes)

Production
- Executive producer: Coca-Cola India
- Producers: Arivu; Sean Roldan
- Production locations: Tamil Nadu, India
- Camera setup: Multi-camera
- Running time: 3–6 minutes

Original release
- Network: YouTube
- Release: 1 February – 27 July 2023
- Network: JioCinema; YouTube
- Release: 3 January 2024 – present

Related
- Coke Studio Bharat

Coke Studio Tamil is an Indian music series that is part of the international franchise, Coke Studio. It features live studio recordings by various artists, showcasing a diverse range of music. This includes classical genres from Tamil Nadu, India, alongside hip hop, rock, and pop music.

The first season began airing on 1 February 2023 and concluded its run on 27 July 2023. This season showcased a collection of seven songs curated by Sean Roldan and Arivu. The second season premiered on 3 January 2024, with Sean Roldan and Arivu continuing their roles as music curators for the season.

== Featured artists ==
=== Season 1's vocalists ===
- Arifullah Shah Rafaee
- Arivu
- Chinmayi Sripaada
- Gaana Vimala
- John Pradeep JL
- Jhanu
- Kalaimamani Gaana Ulaganathan
- Khatija Rahman
- M Lalitha Sudha
- Meenakshi Elayaraja
- Meha
- Muthu
- Mutthammaal
- ofRo
- Pushpavanam Kuppusamy
- Sanjay Subrahmanyan
- Sean Roldan

=== Season 2's vocalists ===
- Aditi Rao Hydari
- Andrea Jeremiah
- Arivu
- Arunraja Kamaraj
- Benny Dayal
- Girishh G
- Mullai Kalai Kuzhu
- Navz-47
- Rajalakshmi Senthilganesan
- Sanjay Subrahmanyan
- Sathyaprakash
- Sean Roldan
- The Ambassa Band
- Vidya Vox
- Vijay Sethupathi

== Songs ==
=== Series overview ===
Series	Episodes	Originally released		
Series	Episodes	First released	Last released	Network
1	7	1 February 2023	27 July 2023	YouTube
2	9	20 December 2023	present	JioCinema & YouTube

=== Season 1 (2023) ===
No. overall	No. in season	Song Title	Artist(s)	Lyricist(s)	Composer(s)	Original release date
-	-	"Idhu Namma Isai"	M Lalitha Sudha, Meha, Sean Roldan	Ba. Murali Krishnan & Sean Roldan	Sean Roldan	23 January 2023
1	1	"Sagavaasi"	Arivu & Khatija Rahman	Arivu	Arivu	1 February 2023
2	2	"Vendum"	Sean Roldan & Meenakshi Elayaraja	Sean Roldan	Sean Roldan	6 March 2023
3	3	"Tamizhi"	Pushpavanam Kuppusamy & ofRo	Ashwin Samynathan, ofRo, Pushpavanam Kuppusamy, Urban Thozha & Vishnu Edavan	ofRo, Pushpavanam Kuppusamy & Sean Roldan	6 April 2023
4	4	"Kan Moodudho"	Chinmayi Sripaada & John Pradeep JL	Kaber Vasuki	Sean Roldan	4 May 2023
5	5	"Urudhi"	Sanjay Subrahmanyan & Arifullah Shah Rafaee	Krithika Nelson	Sean Roldan	23 May 2023
6	6	"Daavula Darling"	Gaana Vimala & Kalaimamani Gaana Ulaganathan	Kalaimamani Gaana Ulaganathan	Kalaimamani Gaana Ulaganathan	21 June 2023
7	7	"Puzhudhi"	Jhanu, Muthu & Mutthammaal	Jayamkondar, Muthu & Mutthammaal	Jhanu	27 July 2023

=== Season 2 (2024) ===
No. overall	No. in season	Song Title	Artist(s)	Lyricist(s)	Composer(s)	Original release date
-	-	"Idhu Semma Vibe"	Sean Roldan & El Fé Choir by Roe Vincent	Sean Roldan	Sean Roldan	20 December 2023
8	1	"Kaakarattan"	Vidya Vox & Rajalakshmi Senthilganesan	Yugabharathi	G. V. Prakash Kumar	3 January 2024
9	2	"Please Purinjukko"	Aditi Rao Hydari & Sean Roldan	Sean Roldan & Vignesh Shivan	Sean Roldan	31 January 2024
10	3	"Elay Makka"	Andrea Jeremiah, Girishh G, Navz-47, Sanjay Subrahmanyan & Sathyaprakash	Mohan Rajan & Navz-47	Girishh G	21 February 2024
11	4	"Roar-a Yethu"	Arunraja Kamaraj, Sean Roldan & Vijay Sethupathi	Arunraja Kamaraj	Sean Roldan	13 March 2024
12	5	"Thamizh Vaazhthu"	Arivu & The Ambassa Band	Bharathiyar, Madurai Ilangumaranar & Thiruvalluvar	Arivu	10 April 2024
13	6	"Oh Hoi"	Benny Dayal, Mullai Kalai Kuzhu, Arivu & Sean Roldan	Arivu	Sean Roldan & Arivu	20 May 2024
14	7	"Kalyana Kacheri"	Kapil Kapilan, Sithara Krishnakumar	Karthik Netha	Justin Prabhakaran	16 June 2024

== Production ==
=== Season 1 (2023) ===
The first season was curated by Arivu and Sean Roldan, and managed and produced by GroupM Motion Entertainment and Studio X. The video production was directed by Amith Krishnan, with StudioMOCA Productions Pvt. Ltd. handling the production. A. Amaran served as the production designer. Universal Music India was responsible for the content marketing strategy, as well as audio distribution and marketing.

=== Season 2 (2024) ===
Season 2 was curated by Arivu and Sean Roldan, with the season narrative crafted by GroupM Motion Entertainment. The season was managed and produced collaboratively by GroupM Motion Entertainment and Studio X. The video production was directed by Amith Krishnan and handled by StudioMOCA Productions Pvt. Ltd, with Michael BFA serving as the production designer.

== See also ==
- Coke Studio Bharat
- Coke Studio Bangla
- Coke Studio Pakistan
