= Niladri Kumar =

Indian sitar player and composer (born 1973)

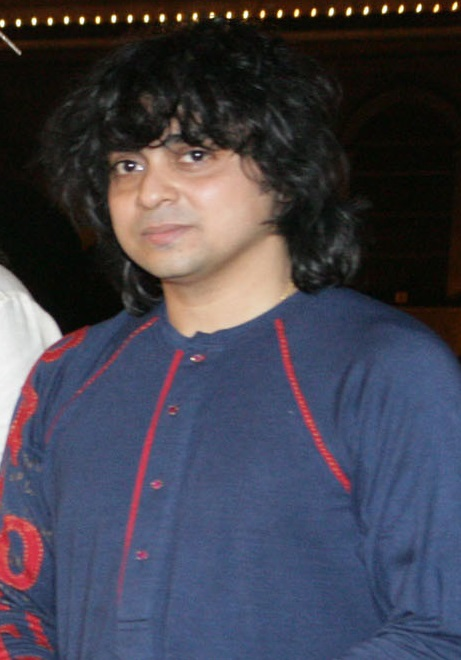

Background information
- Born: 1973 (age 52–53)
- Origin: Calcutta, West Bengal, India
- Occupations: Sitar Maestro and Composer
- Instrument: Sitar
- Website: www.niladrikumar.com

Niladri Kumar is an Indian sitar player and music composer. The invention of the zitar was done by him. He is known to be one of the most popular musicians of his generation, as stated by fellow sitar maestro Purbayan Chatterjee. Kumar has collaborated with many top musicians, such as Zakir Hussain, Arjit Singh, and John McLaughlin.

== Early life ==
He was born to sitar player Kartick Kumar, a disciple of Ravi Shankar. He began learning the sitar under his father's guidance at the age of four. Kumar gave his first public performance at the age of six at Sri Aurobindo Ashram in Pondicherry.

== Career ==
He was a part of the Masters of the Percussion tour alongside Zakir Hussain. Kumar has also worked with Jonas Hellborg and V. Selvaganesh on their album Kali's Son and with John McLaughlin on album Floating Point. Kumar has also worked with various music directors in Hindi cinema, including A.R. Rahman, Shankar–Ehsaan–Loy and Pritam. Niladri was conferred the Sangeet Natak Akademi's Ustad Bismillah Khan Yuva Puraskar, awarded to young musicians, in March 2007. Niladri has also won MTV Immies award for the Best Classical/Fusion Instrumental for his album If. The concept initiated from a travelling sitar, which was modified by Kumar to create rock guitar sound out of it. Kumar reduced the number of strings on the instrument from 20 to five. He also added an electric pick-up inside the instrument so that it would sound more like a guitar. His first full album composed using the instrument, titled Zitar, was released in 2008. Kumar wrote the first track for the album Priority in 2003. Over the next five years he improved the track and subsequent track by gauging audience reaction during live performances. He improvised the tracks adding components from various genres such as rock, electronic and lounge. He also won the MN Mathur Award in the 51st Maharana Kumbha Sangeet Samaroh for his contribution to Indian classical music in March 2013. He is currently the Dean of Maya Somaiya College of Performing Arts at Somaiya Vidyavihar University, Mumbai.

== Discography ==
=== Albums ===
- 2001: Together
- 2002: Revelation
- 2003: Dharohar
- 2003: Saanjh Sur
- 2003: If: Magical Sounds of Sitar
- 2005: Sitar Gaze
- 2005: Yoga Lounge (With Chinmaya Dunster)
- 2006: Forever
- 2006: De-Stress Revive (With Rupak Kulkarni)
- 2007: Chillout Forever
- 2007: Faith
- 2008: Zitar
- 2009: Priority
- 2011: Together (With Talvin Singh)
- 2013: Plucked
- 2014: Sur Yajna

=== Films ===
- Bunty Aur Babli - Chup Chup Ke (Sitar)
- Gangster - Na Jaane Koi (Zitar)
- Omkara - Naina thag lenge (Sitar)
- Life in a... Metro - Alvida (Zitar)
- Life in a... Metro - In DIno (Zitar)
- Dhoom 2 - Crazy Kiya Re (Zitar)
- Dabangg 2 - Tore naina bade dagabaaz re (Sitar)
- Maazii - Mora Jiya (Zitar)
- Desi Boyz - Make Some Noise (Zitar)
- Paheli - Dheere Jalna (Sitar)
- 7 Khoon Maaf - Aawara (Sitar)
- My Name Is Khan - Tere Naina (Sitar)
- Kalank- Ghar More Pardesiya (Sitar)
- Baahubali: The Beginning - Manohari (Sitar)
- Aashiqui 2 – Sunn Raha Hai (Sitar)
- Laila Majnu
- Kalank - Ghar more pardesiya
- Dr. Arora - Mehram (Song Composer)
- Dr. Arora - Khaalipan (Song Composer)

== Music direction ==
- Shorgul (Tere Bina) - Hindi Movie (2016)
- Niruttara - (All songs) Kannada Movie (2016)
- Laila Majnu - (Ahista Ahista, Tum, Hafiz Hafiz, Sarfiri, Tum Version 2) Hindi Movie (2018)

== Awards and nominations ==
Year	Award	Category	Nominated work	Result	Ref
2018	Mirchi Music Awards	Upcoming Music Composer of The Year	Aahista-Laila Majnu	Won	
2019	64th Filmfare Awards	Rd Burman Award For Upcoming Talent In Film Music	Laila Majnu	Won	
