= Bhanwari Devi (singer) =

Indian folk singer

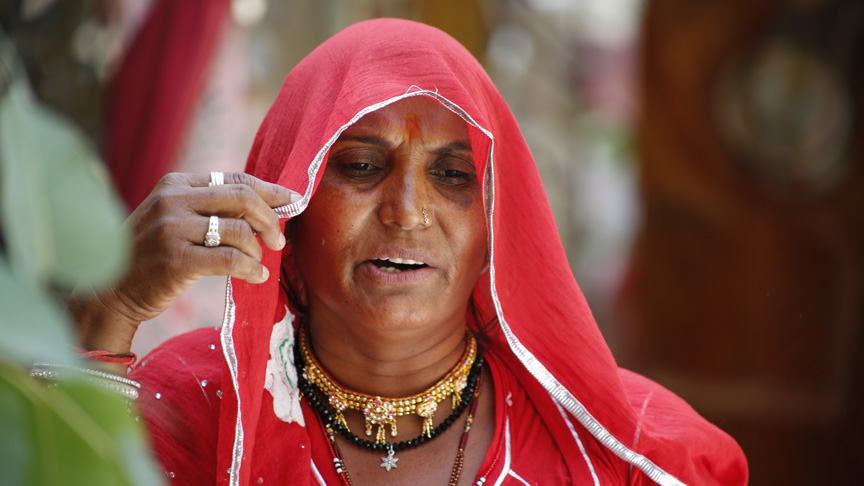
- Bhanwari Devi

Background information
- Born: Bhanwari Devi; 1964 (age 61–62); Rajasthan, India
- Genres: Rajasthani folk music
- Occupation: Folk singer

Bhanwari Devi (born 1964) is a folk singer from Rajasthan, India. She belongs to the Bhopa community, and has gained wide recognition for her performances of traditional and folk music from Rajasthan.

== Career ==
Devi is one of the first women from the Bhopa community to perform widely before national and international audiences, despite social disapproval for women in public performances. She performs, in accordance with Rajasthani social custom, from behind a veil that covers her face. As part of the Bhopa tradition of performances by a husband and wife together, she initially sang devotional music accompanied by her husband, performing a traditional piece of religious literature over five nights, accompanied by a phad, or hand-painted scroll which illustrates the story being performed. Following his death, she continued to perform individually, which was unusual for a female Bhopa singer, and expanded her repertoire to include Rajasthani folk songs outside the Bhopa traditions.

Devi has performed Rajasthani folk music in Indian as well as international fora to wide acclaim, and has collaborated with folk artists from different traditions. In 2003, Devi performed at a music festival in Shimla, in the state of Himachal Pradesh, and was invited to join the Jaipur Virasat Foundation, a civil society group working to promote Rajasthani folk music in India. She subsequently performed at the Jaipur Heritage Festival in 2004. Devi has performed folk music for several years at the Rajasthan International Folk Festival. In 2009, she was invited to accompany singer Rekha Bhardwaj at this festival, and received critical acclaim for her singing. Following that, she collaborated with producers Ram Sampath and singer Sona Mohapatra at the Rajasthan International Folk Festival. In In 2011, she performed at the Edinburgh International Festival, and the Herald Scotland described her performance as consisting of "deeply expressive, beautifully ornamented singing" Jonathan Mills, the director of the Edinburgh International Festival, described her performance as having received an "overwhelming response".

in 2011, as well, she was featured in the Rajasthan International Folk Festival as a "Living Legend", and performed at the historic Moti Mahal palace inside Mehrangarh Fort. In 2013, her participation was described as one of the "...most anticipated acts" of the same festival, in which she performed individually as well as in collaboration with the French ensemble, Gipsy Kings.

In 2013, she collaborated with composer and music producer to perform a version of a traditional folk song, called 'Kattey' on Coke Studio, an Indian television program featuring live studio performances by Indian musicians. Devi's singing was accompanied by rap by British rapper, Hard Kaur, and the song gained popular attention. 'Kattey' was also featured as part of the soundtrack for the 2015 Indian feature film, 'Angry Indian Goddesses'. She later performed a second version of this song with Romani musicians from the Gipsy Kings group. Musician Kutle Khan also featured her on his album, Sounds from the Desert, which recorded folk music from Rajasthan and the Thar desert region.

== Personal life ==
Devi was married as a child, and has nine children, one of whom accompanies her on tour and performs with her. Her father was also a folk musician, and Devi credits him with encouraging her to learn to perform and sing. As a child Devi accompanied her father on his performances. Devi has trained her sons to sing, but has not been able to train her daughters, who are married into families that have objected to their participation in the performance tradition.
