= Mohammad Muneem =

Indian singer and poet

- Born: Mohammad Muneem Nazir; 1983 (age 42–43); Srinagar, Jammu and Kashmir, India
- Occupations: Singer; songwriter; composer; poet
- Years active: 2008–present
- Musical career
- Genres: Sufi; folk; contemporary; pop
- Instruments: Vocals; guitar

Mohammad Muneem Nazir (born 1983) is an Indian singer, songwriter and poet who sings and writes in the Kashmiri, Urdu and Hindi languages. Hailing from Srinagar in the Kashmir Valley, Muneem founded Alif, in 2008. He is known for making music that combines Kashmiri traditional and folk styles with western and contemporary genres.

== Early life and education ==
Mohammad Muneem was born in 1983 in Srinagar in the erstwhile state of Jammu and Kashmir in India. Muneem attended the all-boys Tyndale Biscoe School in Srinagar. At age nine, he was sent to a boarding school in Dehradun, Uttarakhand, where he felt abandoned. He moved back to Srinagar after two and a half years. He performed for the first time at the age of 15 in 1998, at the Sher-e-Kashmir International Convention Centre in Srinagar for a NIIT event. Muneem grew up in Srinagar amidst the violence of the 1990s and early 2000s insurgency in the region, which has had an influence on his artistry. In 2000, he began learning how to play the guitar, on his own. He moved to Pune in 2001 for higher studies, graduated with a degree in engineering and went on to pursue a master's degree in business administration. He states that he suffered a hate crime in 2003, in which he was badly injured.

== Musical career ==
Muneem started a YouTube channel and made an account on Reverbnation in 2007, where he uploaded cover versions of old Kashmiri songs. He co-founded a rock band called Highway 61—a reference to the Bob Dylan album— with Hardik Vaghela and other college friends of his in Pune in 2008, after quitting his job at a MNC. This band was later signed by a production house and renamed Alif, after the first letter of the Urdu alphabet, symbolising 'that which is unseen, strongly united' and 'the oneness of everything'. Other members of the band include Amit Gadgil, Aman Moroney and Karan Chitra Deshmukh.

The band performed on an episode of Indian TV show Coke Studio @ MTV in 2013 with their rendition of Sahibo Sath Chum Mei Chenei, a Kashmiri prayer by poet Mehjoor. In 2014, they recorded a rendition of folk song Cheerith for Kappa TV. The band released an album called Sufayed in 2017, the success of which brought them mainstream popularity.

In December 2018, the band released a single called Ride Home featuring Kashmiri folk artist Noor Mohammad. It was a recreation of an older version of popular ballad Wafadar Mouji.

Muneem has stated that he wished to document old-school artists and preserve their artistry. Such traditional artists declined due to imposition of conservative social codes during the militancy. A song of his was also used in the 2018 Hindi-language Indian film Laila Majnu by director Imtiaz Ali. Muneem states that Ali used the song Katyu Chuko without letting them know, but credited the band for it. In 2019, Muneem was roped in to write dialogue for the film Torbaaz, which also featured a song from his band. The band released their second album, called Siyah, in 2021. They also provided the background score for a 2022 film directed by Shlok Sharma.

=== 2023: "Kya Karie Korimol" ===
In May 2023, the band collaborated a second time with Noor Mohammad for the song Kya Karie Korimol for an episode of Coke Studio Bharat, which also featured Aashima Mahajan, a singer from Jammu, on the lead female vocals. The song is a remake of an original 2018 single by the band. The song also featured wanvun, a type of traditional Kashmiri wedding chorus singing, sung by a group of women. The song garnered 10 million views on YouTube within 13 days of its release.

== Poetry ==
Muneem writes poetry in Urdu and Kashmiri. He teaches Urdu poetry at the Symbiosis International University in Pune.

== Artistry ==
Muneem and his band Alif make music that combines traditional Kashmiri and sufi elements with contemporary Western and rock styles. Muneem draws from his experiences growing up in Kashmir during the insurgency. He states that he seeks to project his homeland in a better light and build compassion through his music. The band's music also often tackles societal issues. Their song Jehlumas, for example, is supposed to be an homage to 'the resilience' of Kashmir's women during and after the 2014 floods there, while another song, Malaal kya hua, revolves around clinical depression. Similarly, Kya Karie Korimol is supposed to be both a celebration and critique of weddings in Kashmir.

== Personal life ==
Muneem is Kashmiri. He divides his time between Mumbai, where he makes his music, Pune, where he teaches and Srinagar, where his family lives. His course “Sarir-e-Khamma” is the first of its kind in India - bringing equitable access to poetry and technical creative writing to people across all strata.

== Filmography ==
=== Film ===
Year	Title	Song	Notes
2018	Laila Majnu	"Katyu Chuko"	

=== Television ===
Year	Show	Song	Notes
2023	Coke Studio Bharat	"Kya Karie Korimol"	
