= Kutle Khan =

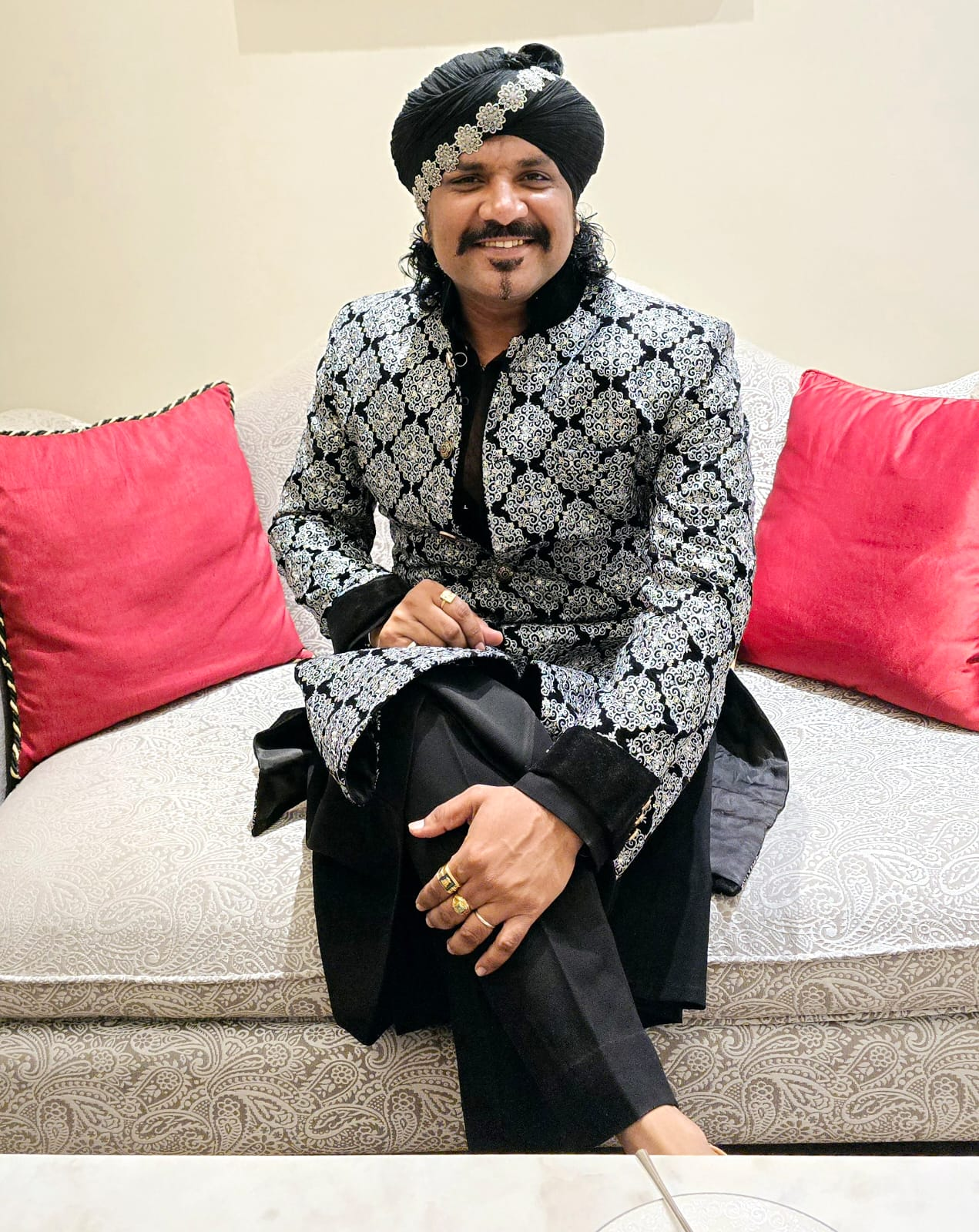
- Kutle Khan in 2024

Background information
- Also known as: Kutle Khan Project
- Born: Kutle Khan; 10 January 1984 (age 42); Rajasthan
- Genres: Folk, Sufi Music, Bollywood
- Occupations: Singer, songwriter
- Years active: 2001–present
- Labels: T-Series, Sony Music

Kutle Khan (born 10 January 1984) is an Indian singer, composer, and songwriter from Rajasthan. He has been a playback singer for numerous films and TV series such as Aambala, Action, Afwaah, Dahaad, Love Shaadi Drama and Kadaisi Ulaga Por. Khan was featured on Coke Studio @ MTV Season 3. He won the Best Folk Single Award at the Global Indian Music Academy Awards (GiMA) 2015 for his composition "Moomal".

Khan was featured on TV series and shows like MTV Coke Studio Season 3, MTV Unplugged, The Dewarists, and Radiocity Freedom Awards, among other projects.

In his career, he has performed in over 80 countries.

== Early life ==
Khan was born on 10 January 1984 in Rajasthan to a family of Manganiyars. His father, Ustad Jethu Khan, started training him at the age of 8. Kutle Khan quit school after the fourth grade to learn and pursue music.

== Career ==
In 2011, Khan formed his band "The Kutle Khan Project" with the musicians Champe Khan, Dayam Khan, and Gafur Khan. Before forming his band, Khan was invited to perform in France by some of the artists who spotted him experimenting with ragas with Khartal at the Artist colony of Jaisalmer.

In 2013, he gained significant recognition after appearing in an episode of Coke Studio MTV (season 3), performing the song "Khari Khari". In 2015, Khan made his singing debut in the film "Aambala", with the songs "Yaarenna Sonnalum". The songs and movie went viral, gaining over a hundred million streams on YouTube and DSPs. Khan started gaining recognition after the songs became popular.

In 2014, he collaborated with MIDIval Punditz for Sony Project Resound's commercial.

In 2016, Khan was featured in IIFA Awards held in Spain. He was later featured in the 20th edition of the IIFA Awards held in Mumbai in 2019 as well along with Jonita Gandi.

In 2019, he received the Best Folk Singer of the Year Award at the Indian Icon Film Awards.

In 2021, Khan did the vocals, morsing, and khartal for the Hindi-language song Param Sundari composed by A. R. Rahman for the film Mimi. The song was released as the lead single along with the soundtrack album on 16 July 2021. The song peaked at No. 184 on the Billboard Global Excl. U.S. chart.

He released his first album, titled The Kutle Khan Project, on 5 October 2016. In 2023, he released an EP, titled Beyond Dunes.

In 2024, his song "Saajan" was released through T-Series. It was produced by Bhushan Kumar. Khan was invited to perform at Nita Mukesh Ambani Cultural Centre's grand inauguration ceremony during its first anniversary since its launch in March 2024. Khan's track "Falak" with Adarsh Rao, and Ravator was featured in Amazon Prime's Sharmajee Ki Beti.

== Discography ==
=== Film songs ===
Year	Film	Song(s)
2024	Kadaisi Ulaga Por	Indha Yudham
2024	Sharmajee Ki Beti	Falak
2023	Love Shaadi Drama	Kesariyo
2023	Afwaah	
2023	Dahaad	Maharaja; Railgaadi
2021	Mimi	Param Sundari
2019	Action	Maula Maula
2015	Aamabala	Yaarenna Sonnalum; Evaremi Antunna; Yaar Enna Sonnalum; Evaremi Antunna; Yaar Enna Sonnalum

=== Singles, EP and albums ===
- 2026: Ae Ajnabee (Coke Studio Bharat) ft. Aditya Rikhari and Ravator.

Year	Title	Label	Type
2024	Saajan	T-Series	Single
2023	Husn Walo Se	T-Series	Single
2023	Afreen		Single
2023	Naina		Single
2023	Falak – Stripped Version		Single
2023	Piya Tum Bim		Single
2023	Beyond Dunes		EP
2022	Rang Hi Rang		Single
2022	Jhirmir		Single
2021	Falak		Single
2020	Mora Saajan		Single
2017	Laal Peeli Akhiyan	Nesco	Single
2016	The Kutle Khan Project	Roots of Pushkar Records	Album
2011	Maula Mere Muala	Peninsula Publications	Single
2011	Chaap Tilak		Single

== Awards ==
Year	Category	Reciptent	Award	Outcome	Ref
2019	Best Folk Singer of the Year		Indian Icon Film Awards	WON	
2015		Moomal	Global Indian Music Academy Awards	WON	
2015	Best Electronica Song (with The Midival Punditz)	Twilight	Global Indian Music Academy Awards	WON	
