= Mohammad Rafiq (radio presenter) =

Indian actor and radio jockey (born 1992)

RJ Rafiq (born 1 February 1992), also known as Mohammad Rafiq Pir, is an Indian radio jockey, MC, actor and voice over artist, who works at Red FM. He presents the Vellapanti Show with RJ Rafiq from 12 PM to 3 PM. He has worked at All India Radio and at DD Kashir. Though mainly a radio jockey, he is also active in emceeing and on digital platforms. RJ Rafiq made his film debut in 2018 with Imtiaz Ali's Laila Majnu playing the role of Touseef.

== Early life ==
Rafiq was born on 1 February 1992 in the town of Handwara, Jammu and Kashmir. He lost his father in early age and was raised in an orphanage in Kashmir. He attended the welfare educational institutes, Degree College Bemina, Chinab Valley College of education, Maulana Azad National Urdu University, Indira Gandhi National Open University and University of Kashmir.

== Career ==
While he was studying, he took a job at Bharti Airtel call centre, later he joined local cable network for few months, Rafiq started his radio career from All India Radio as announcer. He has done several shows for Vividh Bharti Srinagar service like Morning show, Film Magazine, Gadget World and many more. He has also appeared as anchor on DD Kashir for zarai khabar.

Rafiq made his film debut in 2018 in Imtiaz Ali's Laila Majnu where he played Tauseef. He currently works at Red FM 93.5 as radio presenter.

== Filmography ==
=== Films ===
Year	Title	Role
2018	Laila Majnu	Tauseef

== Discography ==
=== Songs ===
Year	Title	Role
2020	Roumut Dildar	Lead
2021	Beqareari	Lead
2021	Walo Ha Baghwano	Lead
2022	Dhokha	Lead
2023	Adhuri Baatein	Lead

== Awards and recognition ==
- 2021: Awarded the Hero Youth icon.
- 2021: Honored with the ‘Kashmir Young Leadership Award’ during the Kashmir Leadership Summit in Srinagar.
- 2022: Received the Best EMCEE award in Kashmir
- 2023 Received Award at The India Audio Summit and Awards Mumbai
