= Laila Majnu (2018 film) =

2018 Indian film by Sajid Ali

- Theatrical release poster
- Directed by: Sajid Ali
- Screenplay by: Imtiaz Ali; Sajid Ali
- Produced by: Ekta Kapoor; Shobha Kapoor; Preety Ali
- Starring: Triptii Dimri; Avinash Tiwary
- Cinematography: Sayak Bhattacharya
- Edited by: Prathamesh Chande
- Music by: Songs: Niladri Kumar; Joi Barua; Alif; Background Score: Hitesh Sonik
- Production companies: Balaji Motion Pictures; PI Pictures
- Distributed by: Balaji Motion Pictures
- Release date: 7 September 2018
- Running time: 140 minutes
- Country: India
- Language: Hindi
- Box office: est.₹2.18–3.25 crore (Initial run) (Note: Multiple references)

Laila Majnu (Hindi pronunciation: [lɛːlaː mədʒnuː]) is a 2018 Indian Hindi-language romantic tragedy film directed by Sajid Ali, presented by Imtiaz Ali, and produced by Ekta Kapoor, Shobha Kapoor, and Preety Ali. The film stars Avinash Tiwary and newcomer Triptii Dimri. A contemporary retelling of the legendary Arabic tragedy Layla and Majnun, it follows two star-crossed lovers, Laila (Dimri) and Qais Bhatt (Tiwary) who are unable to unite as they face opposition from their families. However, when fate intervenes, Laila marries another man while Qais goes to London. They reunite after four years, but end up waiting more for each other.

Released theatrically on 7 September 2018, the film met with lukewarm response and failed commercially at the box office. But in later years, it received positive reviews for its story, cast performances and soundtrack, garnering critical acclaim. Following its digital release, many outlets assigned the film cult status.

== Plot ==
Belonging to a reputed family in Srinagar, Laila is a college student who likes to tease boys who are attracted to her. She meets Qais Bhatt, a boy belonging to a wealthy family. In the beginning, Laila is unsure about him and tells him to not stalk her. Qais gives her a note that says, he will not bother her any more and if she wants him, she has to reach out to him. The following day however, they end up crossing paths again at a wedding and Qais realises it's destiny. Despite ongoing legal disputes between their families, the two fall for each other. When Laila's family finds out about their relationship, they fix her wedding with Ibban, her father's political assistant. She is forced to wed when her father threatens to drink poison if she doesn't comply to marry. However, Laila is still hopeful that Qais will convince her father. But she hears a part of their conversation and breaks up with him reluctantly, assuming he was speaking disrespectfully to her father. Qais, hurt by the misunderstanding, tells her again that he would not follow her any more and asks her to find him if she ever needs him.

After four years, Qais returns from London for his father's funeral. He avoids meeting Laila. Laila, who is regularly abused by her alcoholic husband, the new MLA, decides to meet Qais. When she sees him, she realises that their break-up affected him terribly and that he was struggling with his mental health. He seemed like a different person to her at odd moments. Laila stands up to her husband and they decide to get divorced. Laila asks Qais to wait till her divorce. However, before the divorce, her husband dies in a road accident. Laila decides to run away with Qais on the day of the funeral but her father asks her not to and promises her that she can marry him after Iddah. Laila again asks Qais to wait for her.

Qais, who had been waiting for her for years, feels that he will never be united with her and this thought makes him eccentric. He begins to hallucinate about Laila, he talks to her and eventually runs off to a mountain. His family, friends and Laila search for him for days but are unable to find him. Qais however hallucinates Laila to be with him and starts a life with her in the mountains. After being stoned for interrupting namaz at a local mosque, he is caught by some people and is brought back to his house. There, he recognises Laila but also says that Laila is not one person and she is everywhere, deliriously pointing to different directions.

Laila concludes that he has reached an ultimate state of love. She announces that in order for them to be together their souls need to meet. Then, while holding the note he had given her in the beginning of their relationship, she dies. The note said she has to reach him if she wants him, indicating Laila had started a journey to reach him again. Qais (referred to as Majnu, meaning "crazy" in Arabic language, in the second half of the movie as an ode to Layla-Majnun), realising that Laila is no more, runs towards the mountains when he stumbles and hits his head over Laila's grave. As he takes his last breath, he sees Laila calling to him from the mountain top. The film ends with a song and it is shown that their souls are finally reunited, free to do everything that they had planned they would do together. The film ends with the line, "They lived happily ever after - which is both ironic and true".

== Cast ==
- Triptii Dimri as Laila
  - Hibba Shafi as Young Laila
- Avinash Tiwary as Qais Bhatt / "Majnu"
  - Dawar as Young Qais
- Benjamin Gilani as Ghulam Sarwar Bhatt
- Parmeet Sethi as Masood Ahmed Shahmiri
- Sumit Kaul as Ibban / Javed Parrey
- Abrar Qazi as Zaid
- Sahiba Bali as Ambreen
- Farrhana Bhatt as Jasmeet
- Duaa Bhat as Shama
- Mahid Aisha Ali as Zaid's sister
- Shagufta Ali as "Pufu": Laila's aunt
- Mir Sarwar as Qais' brother-in-law
- Vasundhara Kaul as Qais' sister
- Sujata Sehgal as Parveen: Laila's mother
- RJ Rafiq as Touseef
- Moomin Rafiq as Umer
- Shahid Gulfam as Rasool
- Zameer Ashai as Nisar Bukhari
- Khawar Jamsheed as Mudi

== Production ==
=== Development ===
The concept for Laila Majnu began as a modern retelling of the classic tragic romance Layla and Majnun, conceptualized by writer Imtiaz Ali, who developed parts of the idea approximately a decade before the project materialized. He served as a creative contributor while entrusting direction to his brother Sajid Ali. The screenplay was co-written by both Imtiaz and Sajid, with production led by Balaji Motion Pictures and PI Pictures.

=== Casting ===
The leads were chosen after exhaustive auditions, as director Sajid Ali stated that nearly a thousand actors were assessed to find performers who could disappear into their roles without the preconceptions of stardom. Triptii eventually selected to play Laila, while Avinash Tiwary was chosen for Qais (Majnu).

=== Filming ===
Principal photography took place in Kashmir, with several sequences shot at iconic regional locales including Srinagar, Gulmarg, Pahalgam, and Doodhpathri. The production team included numerous local artists from the Valley in supporting roles.

== Soundtrack ==
Laila Majnu

Soundtrack album by Niladri Kumar, Joi Barua and Alif
- Released: 17 August 2018
- Recorded: 2018
- Genre: Feature film soundtrack
- Length: 42:33
- Language: Hindi
- Label: Zee Music Company
External audio
- Official Audio Jukebox on YouTube

Hitesh Sonik composed the film's background score and Niladri Kumar, Joi Barua and Alif composed the songs. The lyrics were written by Irshad Kamil, Mehmood Gaami and Mohammad Muneem. The first song, "Aahista", was released on 9 August 2018. This was followed by the title track, "O Meri Laila", on 13 August 2018.

Track listing
No.	Title	Music	Singer(s)	Length
1.	"Aahista" (Backing vocals: Ranina Reddy, Harsha Vardhan Chavali)	Niladri Kumar	Arijit Singh, Jonita Gandhi	5:20
2.	"O Meri Laila" (Backing vocals: Ranina Reddy, Arijit Singh, Nakul Abhyankar)	Joi Barua	Atif Aslam, Jyotica Tangri	4:41
3.	"Tum"	Niladri Kumar	Atif Aslam	4:39
4.	"Hafiz Hafiz"	Niladri Kumar	Mohit Chauhan	5:39
5.	"Sarphiri"	Niladri Kumar	Shreya Ghoshal, Babul Supriyo	4:05
6.	"Gayee Kaam Se"	Joi Barua	Dev Negi, Amit Sharma, Meenal Jain	4:13
7.	"Lala Zula Zalio"	Joi Barua	Frankie (Kashmiri), Joi Barua, Sunidhi Chauhan	3:00
8.	"O'Meri Laila" (Radio Version)	Joi Barua	Joi Barua	3:11
9.	"Tum" (Version 2)	Niladri Kumar	Javed Ali	4:41
10.	"Katyu Chuko"	Alif	Mohammad Muneem	3:04
Total length:				42:33

== Awards and nominations ==
Date of ceremony	Awards	Category	Recipient(s) and nominee(s)	Result	Ref.
16 February 2019	Mirchi Music Awards	Upcoming Music Composer of The Year	Niladri Kumar – "Aahista"	Won	
16 February 2019	Mirchi Music Awards	Lyricist of The Year	Irshad Kamil – "Aahista"	Nominated	
23 March 2019	64th Filmfare Awards	Rd Burman Award For Upcoming Talent in Film Music	Niladri Kumar	Won	
23 March 2019	64th Filmfare Awards	Best Playback Singer (Female)	Jonita Gandhi – "Ahista"	Nominated	

== Re-release ==
The film, re-released in Indian theatres on 9 August 2024, due to popular demand, grossed over ₹11.50 crore at the box office, significantly surpassing its original collection of ₹2.18–3.25 crore and becoming the sixth highest grossing re-released Indian film of all time.
