= Anuv Jain =

Indian singer, songwriter and composer

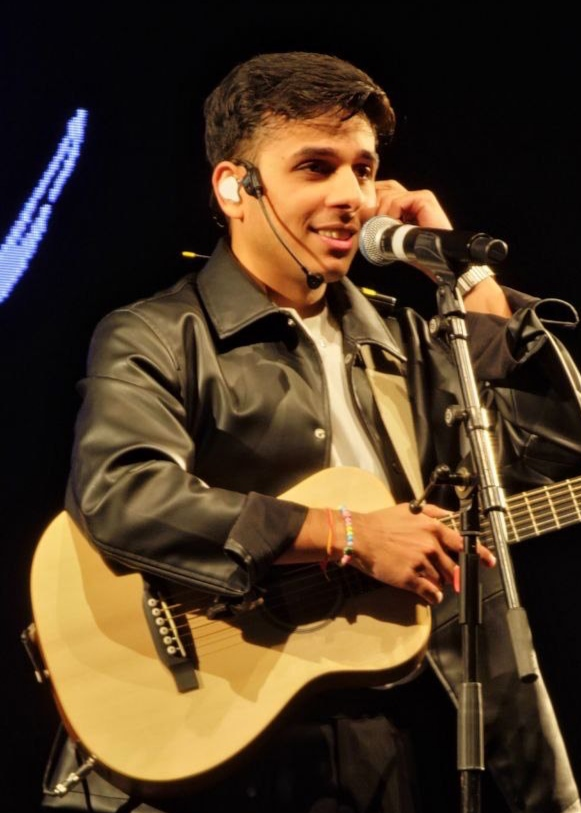
- Jain during his concert in Ludhiana in 2023

Background information
- Born: Anuv Jain; March 11, 1995 (age 31); Ludhiana , Punjab, India
- Genre: Indie
- Occupations: Singer; Songwriter; Composer
- Instruments: Vocals; Guitar; Ukulele
- Years active: 2012—present
- Spouse: Hridi Narang

YouTube information
- Channel: Anuv Jain
- Years active: 2012–present
- Genres: Music; Indie Pop; Acoustic
- Subscribers: 3.8 million
- Views: 1.8 billion
- Last updated: 21 September 2026

Anuv Jain is an Indian singer songwriter and composer. He is known for his simple chorded songs with lyrics that deal primarily with love and heartbreak. His music primarily contains an acoustic guitar or ukulele, unaccompanied by percussion or other instruments.

Considered among the most popular and streamed Indian indie artists, "Baarishein" (2018), "Alag Aasmaan" (2020), "Gul" (2021), "Husn" (2023) and "Jo Tum Mere Ho" (2024) are some of his best known works. "Husn" and "Jo Tum Mere Ho" charted at No.1 on Apple Music India and Spotify India charts for all genres. "Husn" also ranked among the most streamed Indian songs of 2024 on the year-end-charts of all the music streaming platforms. Anuv featured in the Forbes India's 30 Under 30 List of 2023.

== Personal life ==
Anuv was born in Ludhiana, India . He lost his father at the age of 17. When he was 16 years old, Anuv began to write songs as a way to express his emotions.

On 14 February 2025, Anuv married his long-time partner Hridi Narang, the founder of Guru Om Candles and Decor.

== Career ==
=== 2018–2019: Breakthrough with "Baarishein" ===
He started writing at the age of 16 and "Meri Baaton Mein Tu" was the first song which he wrote. At the age of 21, Anuv began uploading original work on his YouTube channel, with his first recorded song being "Baarishein", which was a sleeper hit. In an interview, he told that he wrote the song when he was 17 for a girl with whom he was in love.

"Baarishein" became his first song to cross 100 and 200 million streams on Spotify. In an interview with Rolling Stone India, he said he takes inspiration from real life events and writes songs over a period of months.

=== 2020–2022: Continued acclaim with "Gul" ===
During the COVID-19 pandemic, he decided to pursue music as a full-time career. During the lockdown, he released a number of songs among which "Alag Aasman" and "Gul" became hits. He has performed live shows across the country and at international venues including the UK, Australia, Dubai, Nepal and others.

Anuv was one of the lead singers at Post Malone's India concert in 2022. In an interview with Hindustan Times, he expressed his desire to sing for Ranbir Kapoor in his film. He said in an interview that according to him, social media and DSPs are the key drivers for success in indie music genre in India.

=== 2023–present: "Husn" and further works ===
His 2023 release "Husn" became a smash hit and garnered more than 50 million streams on Spotify within the first month of its initial release and proceeded to cross 300 million streams across all platforms in 3 months becoming his biggest commercial hit. It became his second 200 million streamed track on Spotify India. His 2024 release "Jo Tum Mere Ho" became his second consecutive song after "Husn" to top the music charts in India and crossed 100 million streams on Spotify within 2 months of release. "Husn" became the most streamed indie song of 2024 in the year end charts of the music streaming platforms.

In April 2024, Anuv joined the Sounds Right organised by the United Nations. An innovative global initiative to collect funds for the cause of nature conservation using nature's own sounds like ocean waves, rainstorms, wind and others, the initiative used the sound of Indian rains for "Baarishein".

In 2025, he released "Afsos" featuring AP Dhillon. He further collaborated with Coke Studio India on the song "Arz Kiya Hai" which garnered more than 50 million streams on Spotify. In December 2025, he released song "Inaam". In the same month, Jain joined Jacob Collier on stage, at his Mumbai concert, to perform "Baarishein" with the latter. The performance was poorly received by the audience and was met with criticism and online trolling, while musicians like Chaar Diwaari and Neha Bhasin defended him.

== Musical influences ==
He cites Joji as his main musical inspiration and is an avid listener of Novo Amor.

== Discography ==
List of singles
Title	Year	Ref.
"Baarishein"	2016	
"Ocean"	2018	
"Riha"	2019	
"Maula"	2020	
"Alag Aasmaan"	2020	
"Mishri"	2020	
"Gul"	2021	
"Meri Baaton Mein Tu"	2022	
"Mazaak"	2022	
"Antariksh"	2023	
"Husn"	2023	
"Jo Tum Mere Ho"	2024	
"Afsos" (featuring AP Dhillon)	2025	
"Arz Kiya Hai"	2025	
"Inaam"	2025	
