= Aditya Rikhari =

Musical artist (born 2001)

- Born: Aditya Rikhari; July 30, 2001 (age 25); Uttarakhand, India
- Genre: Pop
- Years active: 2020-present

Aditya Rikhari is an Indian singer, songwriter from New Delhi. He is well known for "Sahiba", and appearing at the reality show I-Popstar as a Mentor.

Rikhari was nominated at the 70th Filmfare Awards for Best Music Album, for his contribution to the Bhool Bhulaiyaa 3 soundtrack.

== Career ==
He started his career in the 2020 during the COVID, releasing cover tracks. His initial tracks "Kya Karein", and "Tu Rehti Hai" received breakthrough. In 2023, His release "Sahiba" received major breakthrough. In 2024, his release "Jaana Samjho Na" was picked up for the Bollywood film Bhool Bhulaiyaa 3, marking his debut entry in film.

The same year, Rikhari released his album Jaana. In 2025, he mentored on the show I-Popstar on Amazon MX Player.

In 2026, he collaborated with Coke Studio India for the track "Aae Ajnabee" with Kutle Khan. The same year, he also announced his India tour for "Meri Paro".
