= Hansika's Love Shaadi Drama =

Reality TV show

- Release poster
- Genre: reality TV show
- Starring: Hansika Motwani
- Country of origin: India
- Original language: English
- No. of seasons: 1
- No. of episodes: 6

Production
- Production companies: Happy Unicorn; Hotstar Specials

Original release
- Network: Disney+ Hotstar
- Release: 10 February 2023

Hansika's Love Shaadi Drama (transl. Hansika's love marriage drama) is a 2023 Indian English-language reality TV show on Disney+ Hotstar that covers the wedding of Indian actor Hansika Motwani and Sohael Kathuriya. Produced under the banner of Happy Unicorn and Hotstar Specials, the series was released on 10 February 2023 and also dubbed in other languages like Tamil, and Telugu.

== Cast ==
- Hansika Motwani as herself (Bride)
- Sohael Kathuriya as himself (Groom)
- Mona Motwani as herself (Mother of Bride)
- Prashant Motwani as himself (cameo appearance) (Brother of Bride)
- Sriya Reddy as herself (Best friend of bride)

== Episodes ==
The first season of the series has six episodes.

Series	Episodes	Originally released
1	6	10 February 2023

=== Season 1 (2023) ===
No.	Title	Directed by	Written by	Original release date
1	"A Twist in the Tale"	Unknown	Unknown	10 February 2023
2	"If Wishes Were Horses"	Unknown	Unknown	17 February 2023
3	"My Daughter Stays Mine"	Unknown	Unknown	24 February 2023
4	"No Horsing Around!"	Unknown	Unknown	3 March 2023
5	"Face the Music"	Unknown	Unknown	10 March 2023
6	"The Fairy Tale Wedding"	Unknown	Unknown	17 March 2023

== Reception ==
Archika Khurana at The Times of India rated the series 2/5, stating "In a nutshell, Motwani is brave for taking control of her wedding narrative, but this docuseries is nothing more than a showcase of celebrity wedding shenanigans. So, if you're a fan of Hansika and want to watch the glam wedding, the show will pique your interest and keep you glued to your screen every Friday for the next episode. Others should look for what they are most interested in."

Namrata Thakkar of Rediff.com gave 2 stars out of 5 and wrote "All in all, the first episode of Hansika's Love Shaadi Drama is decent with a bit of drama and glam. Hopefully, the next episodes will be more dramatic to keep us hooked."

Sunidhi Prajapat of OTT Play in her review stated "Hansika's Love Shaadi Drama is definitely a gorgeous fairytale with indeed a gigantic amount of drama."

== Criticism ==
Hansika Motwani was heavily criticized for turning her wedding into a web series.
