= Sanjay Subrahmanyan =

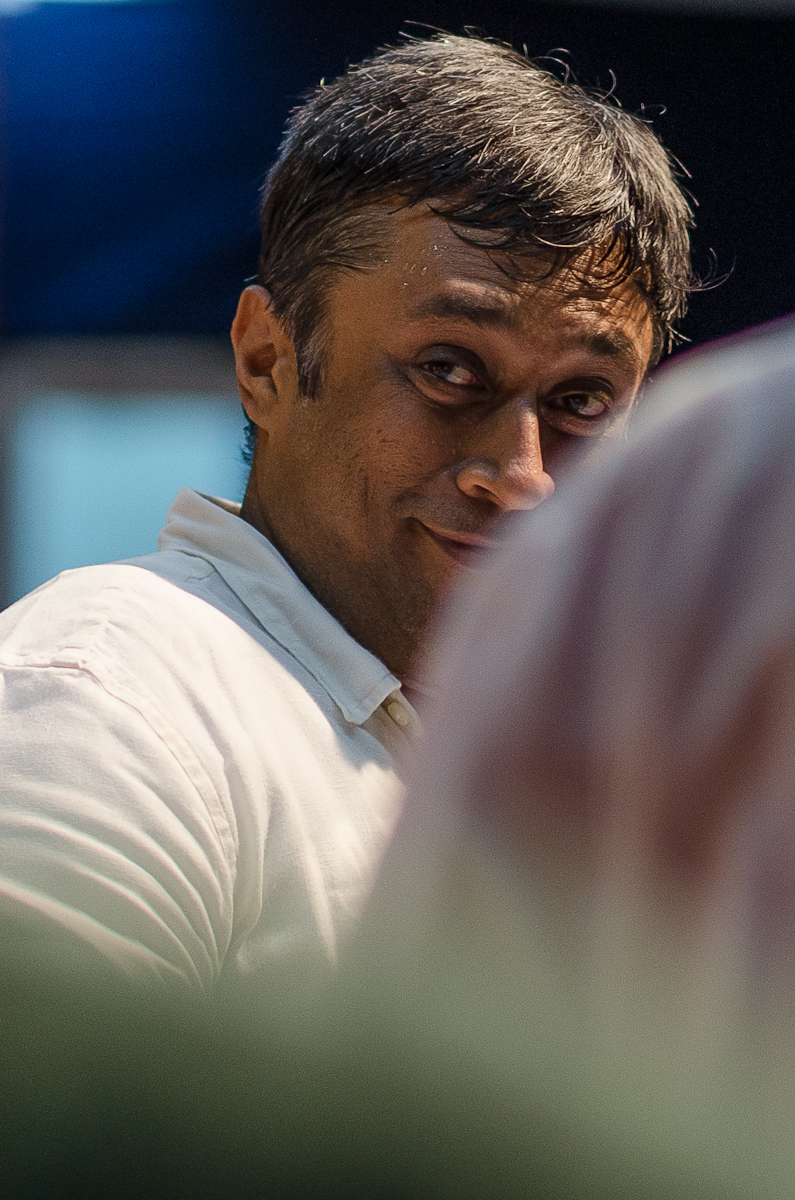

Background information
- Born: 21 January 1968 (age 58)
- Origin: Chennai, Tamil Nadu, India
- Genre: Carnatic music – Indian Classical Music
- Occupation: Singer
- Years active: 1986 –
- Website: www.sanjaysub.com

Sanjay Subrahmanyan (born 21 January 1968 in Chennai, Tamil Nadu) is an Indian Carnatic musician and vocalist. He was awarded the Madras Music Academy's Sangeetha Kalanidhi in 2015. Sanjay is considered one of the leading singers of his generation, and has a significant fanbase and online presence.

== Biography ==
Sanjay Subrahmanyan was born on 21 January 1968 in Chennai to S. Sankaran and Aruna Sankaran . He began learning music at age seven, studying the violin with V. Lakshminarayana and vocals from his aunt late Sukanya Swaminathan. He studied Carnatic Vocal Music from Rukmini Rajagopalan for eight years, until 1988, and after 1989 with Calcutta K. S. Krishnamurthi. It is during this phase, which lasted until KSK’s death in 1999, that he started first developing and then mastering an innovative style of singing that blended tradition and modernity and he set aside his career as an accountant for one in music. It was during this period that Sanjay Subrahamanyan, along with several of his young contemporaries founded the Youth Association of Carnatic Music (YACM). YACM was created for the purpose of promoting Carnatic music amongst the youth, and provided a platform for young Carnatic musicians to showcase their talents. He studied with Semponarkoil S. R. D. Vaidyanathan from 2002 until 2013.

== Awards and honors ==
- 1986: First Prize in the All India Radio Music Competition
- 1997: Sanskriti Award from the Sanskriti Foundation
- 2002: Shanmukha Sangeeta Shiromani Award from Sri Shanmukhananda Fine Arts & Sangeetha Sabha
- 2006: Received title of Kalaimamani Award by the Government of Tamil Nadu, which is the highest state honour in the field of Arts.
- 2009: Kanchi Jagadguru Sankaracharya Sri Jayendra Saraswati National Eminence Award In Fine Arts from Sri Shanmukhananda Fine Arts & Sangeetha Sabha
- 2011: The Indira Sivasailam Endowment Medal from the Indira Sivasailam Endowment Fund and Madras Music Academy
- 2012: GiIMA Award, Best Album in Carnatic Vocal Music from the Global Indian Music Academy
- 2013: Gaana Padhmam from the Brahma Gana Sabha
- 2014: Sri Shanmukhananda National Eminence Award from Sri Shanmukhananda Fine Arts & Sangeetha Sabha
- 2015: Sangeetha Kalanidhi Award from the Madras Music Academy
- 2016: Isai Perarignar Award from the Tamil Isai Sangam

== Discography ==
Sanjay Subrahmanyan was the featured in the documentary film "Aaraar Aasaippadaar" by filmmaker Prasanna Ramaswamy; the documentary film was screened in November 2006 in Chennai.

He also featured in the Season 1 & 2 of Coke Studio Tamil. In 2023, Sanjay Subrahmanyan made his debut as a playback singer in a Tamil film, Lucky Man.

His latest album Anbenum Peruveli (Tamil) translates to "the grand expanse called love". Named in Tamil by A. S. Panneerselvan, this musical project was commissioned by Metakovan a.k.a. Vignesh Sundaresan and conceived by Onemai Foundation. The various artistic interpretations and responses to reimagining the poetry of the 19th Century Tamil saint Ramalinga Adigal, popularly known as Vallalar has been an act of contemplation by all those involved. At its core, Anbenum Peruveli is the musical exploration by singer Sanjay Subrahmanyan, in presenting Vallalar in his voice, as an original and new musical collaboration with the composer Sean Roldan.

Sanjay Subrahmanyan's discography is presented below.

Carnatic Music Albums

| Year | Album Title | Accompanists | Producer | Content |
|---|---|---|---|---|
| 2014 | Vani Mahal (Live) | - | Sanjay Subrahmanyan | Varnam - Begada - Adi - Tiger Varadachariyar (Live), Azhi Mazhai - Varali - Adi - Andal (Live), Kamalamba - Anandabhairavi - M Chapu - Muttusvami Dikshitar (Live), Mattrupattrena - Todi - Rupakam - Sundarar (Live) |
| 2015 | Sethalapathy Memorial Concert (Live) | - | Sanjay Subrahmanyan | Varnam Saveri Adi (Live), Ganapatiye Karaharapriya Adi (Live), Nadadina Janaranjani Mchapu (Live), Enadumanam Harikambhoji Adi (Live), Pollaapuli Mayamalavagowla Adi (Live) |
| 2015 | Ramanavami (Live) | - | Sanjay Subrahmanyan | Satura Kamini (Kalyani) (Live), Vande Mataram (Kedaram) (Live), Brovasamaya (Gowrimanohari) (Live), Nannu Vidachi (Reetigowla) (Live), Aaro Ivar (Bhairavi) (Live) |
| 2019 | S Rajam Centenary Concert (Live) | - | Sanjay Subrahmanyan | Adineepai Jyotiswarupini Varnam (Live), Durusuga Saveri (Live), Sami Deekshita Devamanohari (Live), Phanipatisayi Jhankaradhwani (Live), Akshayalinga Sankarabharanam (Live) |
| 2019 | Sameeram (Live) | - | Sanjay Subrahmanyan | Charanamule (Kapi) (Live), Maneyolagado (Abhogi) (Live), Nanubrovamani (Yamunakalyani) (Live), Ennamovagaiyai (Khamas) (Live) |
| 2020 | Tamizhum Naanum 2019 (Vol 1) (Live) | S Varadarajan - Violin; Neyveli Venkatesh - Mridangam | Sanjay Subrahmanyan | Maye Abhogi Varnam (Live), Hara Hara Siva Gambira Nattai (Live), Chandiran Oliyil Malayamarutam (Live), Ambara Chidambara Janaranjani (Live), Aaro Ivar Bhairavi (Live) |
| 2020 | Tamizhum Naanum 2019 (Vol 2) (Live) | S Varadarajan - Violin; Neyveli Venkatesh - Mridangam | Sanjay Subrahmanyan | Sariyo Nee Varnam (Live), Pallaandu Nattai (Live), Innisai Tamizh Amudam Sriranjani (Live), Kadavulai Maravade Tandavam (Live), Velum Mayilume Sucharitra (Live) |

Independent Music Albums

| Year | Album title | Notes | Producer | Content |
|---|---|---|---|---|
| 2024 | Anbenum Peruveli | Ramalinga Adigal (Vallalar) - Poetry, Sean Roldan - Music Composer, Sanjay Subrahmanyan - Singer | Onemai Foundation | Ithu Nalla Tharunam, Anjathe Nenje, Kallarkum, Orumayudan, Vennila, Arutperum Jothi |

Carnatic Music - Singles

| Year | Single | Notes | Producer | Album |
|---|---|---|---|---|
| 2018 | Shri Krishnam (Rupavati Dikshitar) | Rupavati Composition by Muthusami Dikshitar | Sanjay Subrahmanyan | - |
| 2019 | Tunbam Nergaiyil Desh (Live) | Bharathidasan - Writer | Sanjay Subrahmanyan | - |
| 2023 | Ramasami Doothan | Arunachala Kavi - Writer | Sanjay Subrahmanyan | - |

Film Music - Singles

| Year | Single | Notes | Album |
|---|---|---|---|
| 2023 | Yedhudhaan Inga Sandhosam (Debut Song - Tamil Films) | Balaji Venugopal - Writer Sean Roldan - Singer & Music Producer | Lucky Man |
| 2024 | Manasula | Ilaiyaraaja - Music & Lyrics; co-singer Ananya Bhat | Viduthalai Part 2 |

Independent Music - Singles

| Year | Single | Other Singers | Producer | Album |
|---|---|---|---|---|
| 2023 | Urudhi | Arifullah Shah Rafaee | Coke Studio Tamil | Coke Studio Tamil - Season 1 |
| 2024 | Elay Makka | Andrea Jeremiah, Girishh Gopalakrishnan, Sathyaprakash, Naveeni (Navz 47) | Coke Studio Tamil | Coke Studio Tamil - Season 2 |

== Television ==
| Year | Name of Television Show | Role | Network |
|---|---|---|---|
| 2024 | Super Singer - Season 10 | Guest | Star Vijay |
