= Barmer Boys =

Indian Sufi music group

- Genres: Traditional, Sufi, Gypsy folk
- Instrument: Harmonium Morchang Bhapang Khartaal Dholak
- Years active: 2011–present
- Labels: Amarrass Records
- Members: Manga Sawai Khan Magada Khan

Barmer Boys is an Indian musical group produced by Amarrass Records. They belong to the Manganiyar Sufi Muslims community from Rajasthan

== History ==
It formed in 2011 at the Amarrass Desert Music Festival.

The group performed in India, Asia, Europe and North America. They have been featured on MTV Coke Studio and released two critically acclaimed albums.

== Music ==
The Barmer Boys blend traditional Sufi and gypsy folk music. Their repertoire encompasses musical traditions from the religious and spiritual communities of the northwest Indian subcontinent region.

The Barmer Boys songbook reflects the influence of the Bhakti-Sufi movement of the 15th century. It takes the form of popular Kabir and Meera bhajans, as well as Sufi kalams. This is evident in tracks such as "Vaari Jaun", "Ranaji" and "Pir Jilani". They include songs that are typically performed at weddings and births in local villages and communities. The band's music incorporates elements such as beatboxing, electronic music, and DJs.

== Members ==
The Barmer Boys is a trio: Manga (vocalist and harmonium), Sawai Khan (morchang, khartaal, bhapang and beatboxing), and Magada Khan (dholak). The group has had various percussion players take dholak duties, including Mangu Khan, Tarif Khan, Barkat Khan, and Rajak Khan.

Musician	Instrument
Manga	Harmonium, vocals
Sawai Khan	Various percussion instruments – morchang (Jewsharp, jawharp, lamellophone, morsing), bhapang, khartaal, beatboxing
Magada Khan	Dholak

== Discography ==
Album	Year	Label	Notes
At Home	2012	Amarrass Records	4 Stars - Songlines, 4 Stars - Downbeat Magazine
Kesariya Balm	2017	Amarrass Records	First folk LP to be made in India in the 21st century

== Tours ==
Barmer Boys have performed on national and international platforms across Asia, Europe and North America. International performances include Roskilde Festival (2014), where they earned the spot between OutKast and the Rolling Stones, Wassermusik, Berlin (2015, 2017), Winnipeg Folk Festival (2015), Ziro Festival of Music (2015, 2017), Music Meeting (2015), Feito A Man (2015), Clockenflap Hong Kong (2015), In2Wild Festival, UK, (2016), Festival 3 Culturas (2017) and Stockholm Cultural Fest (2017).

== Notable collaborations ==
They have shared the stage with artists such as Bombino, Fatoumata Diawara, Vieux Farka Tourè, BaBa ZuLa, Estrella Morente, and Khaled among others. Barmer Boys worked with Bollywood composer Clinton Cerejo on their song "Pir Jilani", featured on MTV Coke Studio Season 3. Rais Khan collaborated with A.R. Rehman for musical recordings for MTV Unplugged in 2017 and featured on recordings by Mumford and Sons.

The group performed with various DJs, presenting a fusion of Sufi Gypsy folk techno with artists such as DJ HVAD (at Distortion Festival in Copenhagen), AudioPervert, Thee J Johanz and DJ Spincycle (Amarrass Records, at Stockholm Culture Festival, Gothenburg Festival, Winnipeg Folk Festival, Flaunt@Harbourfront Centre and various events in Delhi).

Barmer Boys is also working on a full-length release and a full-length live performance with Danish post-rock band Himmelrum. The two bands have performed live at various venues in Denmark and have released a single on bandcamp, "Nagma-Ranaji" (2018, Amarrass Records).

== Reception ==
The group's first album, At Home (2012, Amarrass Records), single-take field recordings made in the artists home in Barmer, received 4 stars in Songlines and was described by Songlines Editor Simon Broughton as "Incandescent Sufi voices that incite ecstasy". Their second album, Kesariya Balm (2017, Amarrass Records), debuted on the Transglobal World Music Charts Top 40 in 2017. Barmer Boys featured on BBC Asian Network, BBC Hindi, and BBC World Service programming in 2015 and 2016, NPR Music in 2015, and community radio stations WORT 89.9 FM Madison and WFMU 91.1 FM.
