= Dhruv Sangari =

Indian singer (b. 1981)

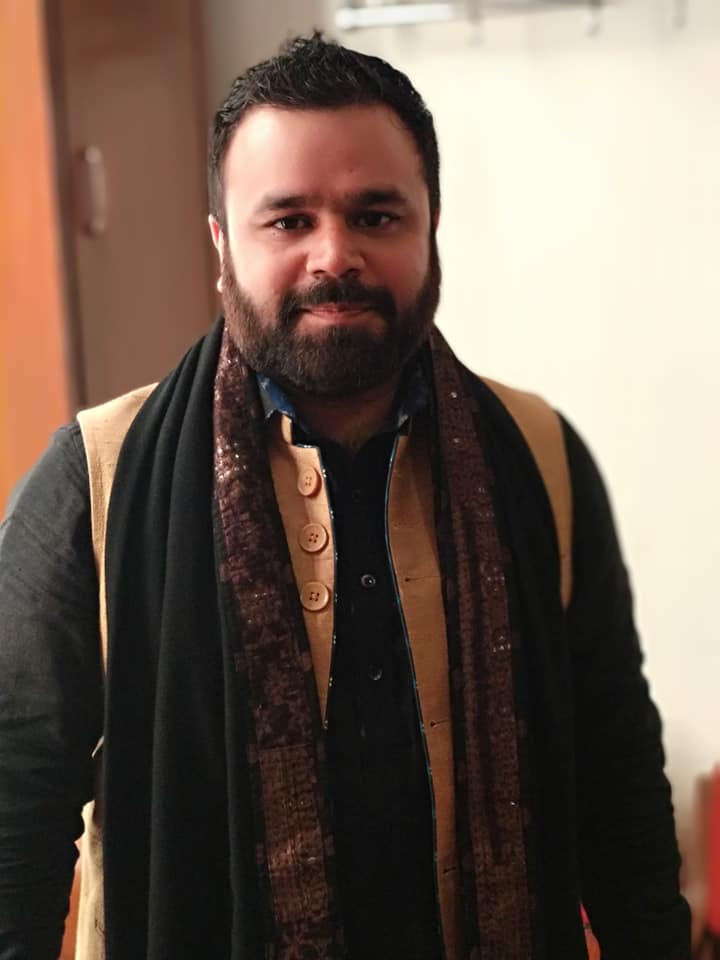
Artiste Dhruv Sangari (Bilal Chishty)

Dhruv Sangari also known as Bilal Chishty (Urdu: بلال ڇݜتى) is a Classical Indian vocalist, composer, lyricist and teacher. He is the son of scholar-author Kumkum Sangari and painter Mahendra 'Manu' Sangari.

== Early life and training ==
Born in 1981, Dhruv began his training in Hindustani classical music at the age of seven with Shahana Bannerjee and continued under Ustad Iqbal Ahmad Khan. He also trained in the tabla from Pandit B.S. Ramanna. Later, he developed an interest in Sufism and Sufi music and started learning qawwali from Ustad Meraj Ahmed Nizami of the Qawwal-Bachhe Gharana at the dargah of the Sufi saint Nizamuddin Auliya in Delhi.

His journey in music led him to discover Pakistani Qawwali maestro Ustad Nusrat Fateh Ali Khan, whom he eventually met and learnt from in the mid-1990s.

Having completed his studies in Hindustani classical music from the University of Delhi under such musical stalwarts as Dr. Krishna Bisht, Dr. Najma Parveen Ahmad and Ustad Ghulam Sadiq Khan, Dhruv went on to become a full-time concert and recording artiste and has been performing with various bands since 2000. During this period he anchored a 25-episode series based on Indian classical Ragas 'Tarang ki Mehfil' broadcast on ETV Urdu.

A decade ago a chance meeting with Syed Salman Chishty and Syed Dr. Peer Najmul Hassan Chishty led him down the spiritual path and he took hand with the latter in the city of Ajmer, thus being formally inducted into the Chishti Sufi Order. During his travels across the world as a musician he also became close to Sheikh Ibrahim Farajaje and Sheikh Muhammad bin Yahya al-Ninowy. A follower of Sufi Islam, Dhruv remains an active voice on issues of Sufism and Sufi Culture and regularly performs offerings at various Sufi shrines across the Indian Subcontinent. His spouse is Anam Hassan, whom he married in 2016.

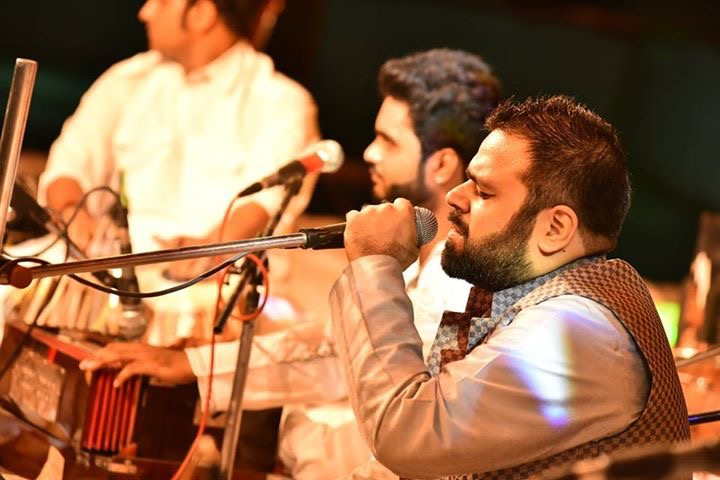
Singer Dhruv Sangari (Bilal Chishty)

== Biography, career profile and discography ==
Popularly known as 'Prince of Qawwali' Dhruv has sung and composed the mystic verses of poets and saints such as Baba Farid, Amir Khusrau, Mirabai, Rumi, Jami, Bulleh Shah, Kabir, Saim Chishty, Allama Iqbal, Bedil and Shah Niyaz among others. His early experimental works were with Swiss electronic musicians Lionel Dentan and David Scruffari with the band Da-Saz. Their debut album 'Jet-Lag was released by Phat-Phish Records in 2008.

In 2008 Dhruv scripted and anchored another series based on Indian Classical Music titled 'Raagon ki Haseen Duniya' that aired on DD Urdu. In 2011 he went on to collaborate on the album 'Hope' with artists Timothy Hill and Eric Thomas for the Nasreen & Alam Sher Foundation, US. In 2012 he sang Saim Chishty's famous poem 'Haq Ali Maula'(originally sung by Nusrat Fateh Ali Khan) with his band Humble Mystic for [Coke Studio MTV at Reliance Studios, Mumbai.

Apart from singing the 2013 chartbuster 'Lutt Jawaan' for Music Director Mannan Shah in the movie Commando: A One Man Army starring Vidyut Jamwal, and the hit Coke Studio (India) MTV track 'Kyun Na' with composer Amit Trivedi; Dhruv penned the lyrics for song 'Abr e Karam' sung by Shilpa Rao for the movie Bhopal: A Prayer for Rain released in 2014 starring Martin Sheen, Mischa Barton and Kal Penn. Dhruv was also featured in Fox Life’s series Sound Trek (season 2) in the episode 'Dumdam Must Qalandar' in 2014. In 2017 he gave voice for the score of Andy Serkis's film Mowgli: Legend of the Jungle with London-based composer Nitin Sawhney. Currently Dhruv is working on a series of single tracks and on reviving old and less heard South Asian Sufi melodies.

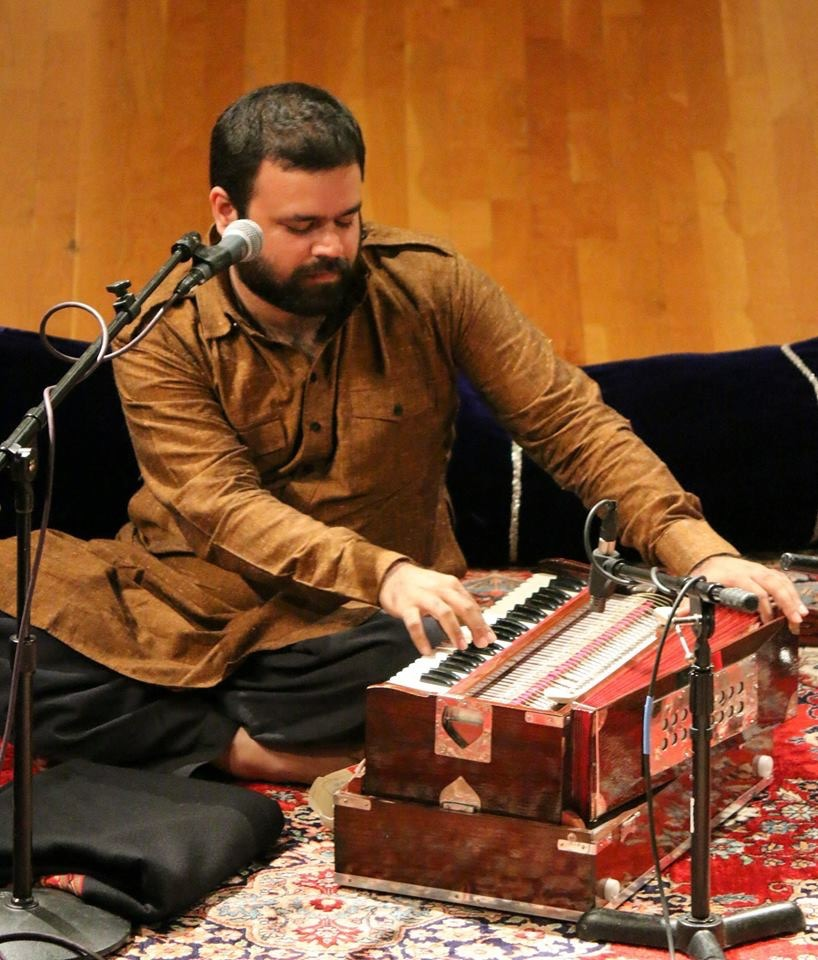
Dhruv Sangari (Bilal Chishty) in concert

Primarily influenced by Sufi and classical maestros including Nusrat Fateh Ali Khan, Abida Parveen, Sabri Brothers, Ustad Rashid Khan, Madan Gopal Singh and Shubha Mudgal; Dhruv-Bilal, in addition to his music, has also collaborated, taught, performed and presented papers at conferences with several artistes, scholars, international institutions and universities. He worked with Theater director Habib Tanvir on the proscenium Hypatia, with Joachim Schloemer's PVC Tanz at Auroville, India, Stadttheater and House of World Cultures, Germany for the critically acclaimed play The Abduction of Sita, based on artist Nina Paley's 'Sita sings the Blues; at the Smithsonian Institution, DC; as Artist in Residence at Colby College, Maine; and in various events at Stanford University, Johns Hopkins, SAIS, DC; Berkeley, SFO; New York University, NY, US Library of Congress and the University of Virginia, US, National College of Art, Lahore and the National Center for Performing Arts, Mumbai.

As lead vocalist for a number of bands like Da-Saz, Rooh Sufi Ensemble, Humble Mystic etc., Dhruv has performed at Indian and international festivals such as Bhakti Utsav, Gurgaon Utsav, ICCR International Sufi Festival, International Sufi Festival of Kolkata, Maharaja Sayajirao Gaekwad Jayanti, Hriday Drishyam, Samagam, Prem Rawat, Sahaj Yoga, Navras, Siddhartha Festival, Vana Foundation, The Sufi Route (headlined by A.R. Rahman, Gaana BMP, Krishnakriti, Phool Walon Ki Sair, Serendipity Arts Festival, Parramasala Festival, Parramatta (with David Hykes), Serpentine Gallery, London, Chhandayan, NYC and Sufism at the Smithsonian, Washington DC.

Empaneled with the Indian Council for Cultural Relations ICCR and the Festivals of India Abroad, Ministry of Culture (India), Dhruv (along with filmmaker Yousuf Saeed) is a founding member of UNESCO cited organization Ektara India which has worked towards archiving and disseminating materials on Sufi-Bhakti culture based themes. The organization has also regularly conducted workshops and heritage trails highlighting the contribution of the Sufi saints. Dhruv has conducted and co-facilitated spiritual immersions across India, Pakistan, Turkey and the US and been an experience architect for Times Passion Trails (with Sadia Dehlvi) and Hindustan Times PACE among others.

For his work in the field of Sufi-Bhakti music Dhruv has received awards and recognition from institutions such as Rotary Club, Amir Khusro Foundation, Smithsonian Institution and University of Baroda.
