= Samantha Edwards (singer) =

Samantha Noella
- Born: Mumbai
- Origin: Indian
- Genres: Jazz, R&B, Funk, Blues
- Occupation: Singer
- Instrument: Voice
- Years active: 1991 to present
- Website: www.samanthanoella.com

Samantha Noella is an Indian singer and vocal coach based in Mumbai. Her styles include Jazz, R&B, Funk, Blues and Soul. Having worked as a Singer, Composer and lyricist since 1992, she began Voice Coaching since 2006. She is a well recognised Vocal Coach in Western Modern / Contemporary Music and has coached several students, amateurs, semi-professional and professional singers including well known industry professionals like Priyanka Chopra, Hrithik Roshan, Varun Dhawan, Nargis Fakhri, Alia Bhatt, Shrradha Pandit, Vasuda Sharma, Shahana Goswami, Hazel Keech, Preeti Desai and others.

== Early life and education ==
Noella was born and raised in Bandra, Mumbai and began singing on stage from the age of 5. Samantha schooled at the Apostolic Carmel High School in Bandra, Mumbai and graduated with a bachelor's degree from St. Xavier's College, Mumbai and a master's degree through Bombay University.

Although a Western singer, Noella trained in Indian classical music and thereafter studied the Kodály Method for three years. Since 1996, Samantha has studied voice with singers like Peter Eldridge (Grammy Winner), Roseanna Vitro (Grammy Nominee), Norman Simmons, Bob Stoloff, Judy Niemack, Barry Harris, Janice Borla, Jay Clayton and others.

Noella holds 2 Licentiates in Music Performance – Vocal and Music Teaching from Rockschool, UK.

Modern Vocal Level 1 Certifications

== Career ==
Samantha is a recording artist and has recorded several films and advertisement jingles over the last 25 years. She also performs with her band.

=== Recording artist ===
Edwards was vice-president of the Cine Singers' Association for 10 years.

=== Live performances ===
In 1993, Samantha was part of a band called Mantra which released songs like Jantar Mantar which received airplay on MTV and Channel V.

Since 1995, Samantha has performed with several bands across multiple genres like Country, Pop, Motown, Folk, R&B and Jazz. In 2001 Samantha formed her Jazz & Blues band Samantha Edwards With Take 4. The band played at the International Jazz Yatra in Mumbai in 2002 and also performed at the Panjim Downtown Jazz festival in Goa.

== Personal life ==
Samantha has 2 children. Samantha also loves baking and cooking. In 1997 she started Sam's Desserts & Pastries catering to clients with pastries, wedding cakes and starters.
