= Coke Studio (Indian TV program) =

Indian music-television programme

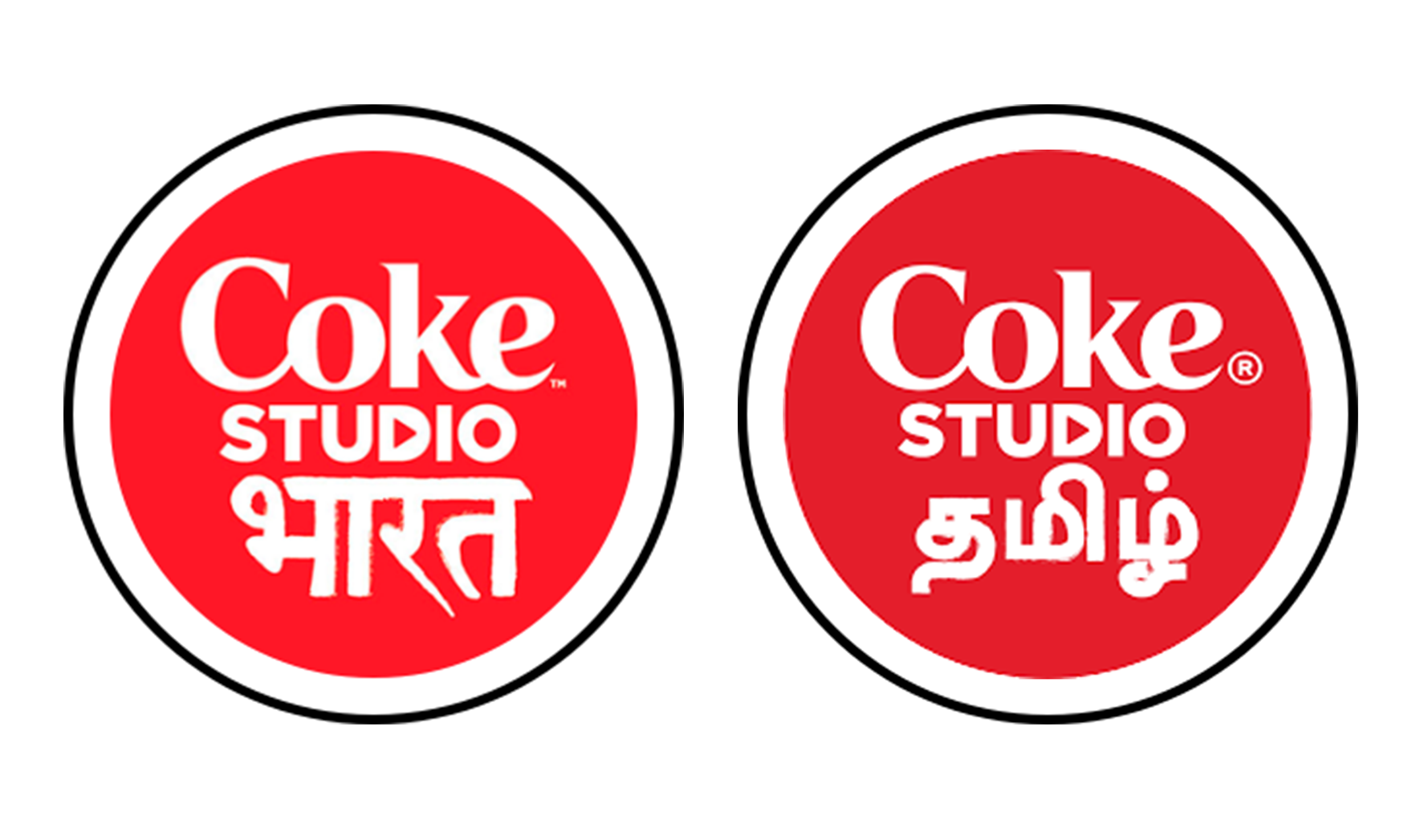
- The official logos of two properties of Coke Studio India, the first being rebranded as Coke Studio Bharat and the newly launched edition, Coke Studio Tamil.
- Based on: Coke Studio
- Country of origin: India
- No. of episodes: (list of episodes)

Production
- Executive producer: Coca-Cola India
- Production location: India
- Camera setup: Multi-camera

Original release
- Network: MTV India (2011-2015); DD National (2012-2015)
- Release: 17 June 2011 – 4 October 2015
- Network: YouTube; JioCinema
- Release: 1 February 2023 – present

Related
- Coke Studio @ MTV; Coke Studio Tamil; Coke Studio Bharat

Coke Studio is an Indian music series that's part of the international franchise, Coke Studio. It features live studio recordings by various artists, showcasing a diverse range of music. This includes classical genres from the Indian subcontinent like Hindustani, Carnatic, Indian folk, alongside hip hop, rock, and pop music.

Launched in India in 2011 as Coke Studio @ MTV, the program enjoyed a successful run for four seasons, culminating in 2015. Currently, India boasts two active editions: Coke Studio Tamil and Coke Studio Bharat. The program's concept originated in Brazil and has subsequently expanded its reach worldwide.

== History ==
The Coke Studio phenomenon emerged in Brazil in 2007. It was conceived as a studio-based adaptation of Brazil's existing live concert platform, Estúdio Coca-Cola. This new format aimed to foster musical fusions by bringing together two Brazilian artists and blending their styles. The concept found international application in 2008 with the launch of Coke Studio Pakistan. Through a partnership between Nadeem Zaman, then Marketing Head of Coca-Cola, and Rohail Hyatt, a former member of the Pakistani band Vital Signs, the inaugural season of Coke Studio Pakistan achieved significant success. This initial format featured live audiences, which transitioned to a closed studio setting from season two onwards, remaining so until season thirteen.

In June 2012, Coke Studio launched an Indian adaptation titled Coke Studio @ MTV. Leslee Lewis produced the first season, with subsequent seasons seeing a rotation of producers. This collaborative effort between Coca-Cola India and MTV India saw MTV India serve as the official broadcaster for all four seasons. Following an eight-year hiatus, Coke Studio revived its Indian program in February 2023. The show was rebranded as Coke Studio Bharat, signaling a shift towards a focus on India's rich musical heritage. In the same month, Coke Studio also introduced its Tamil-language edition, titled Coke Studio Tamil.

== Format ==
The show retained the essence of Coke Studio, featuring a unique combination of artists accompanied by a house band and additional musicians. The recorded performances are available on various streaming platforms, showcasing both the lead vocalists and the ensemble, captured through close-up shots during live recordings.

The program offers a diverse mix of Western and traditional instruments from the Indian subcontinent. Instruments like pianos, guitars, bass guitars, synthesizers, harmoniums, rubabs, sarods, sitars, bamboo flutes, dholaks, tablas, and other percussion instruments are part of the mix.

While Coke Studio @ MTV was aired on both television and digital platforms, maintaining a consistent episodic structure throughout its four seasons, the introduction of Coke Studio Bharat and Coke Studio Tamil altered the format. These new editions, exclusively accessible on digital platforms, transitioned to releasing individual songs instead of featuring multiple songs within each episode.

== Coke Studio @ MTV ==
The Indian iteration of the Coke Studio franchise, titled Coke Studio @ MTV, ran for four seasons in collaboration with MTV India. The show's premiere took place on 17 June 2011, on MTV India. The subsequent season followed on 7 July 2012, expanding its broadcast to include DD National alongside MTV India. Season three debuted on 17 August 2013, on a wider platform encompassing MTV India, Big FM, and DD National. This season further extended its reach with an additional broadcast on All India Radio on 24 August 2013. The fourth and final season commenced on 1 March 2015.

=== Season 1 (2011) ===
Coke Studio @ MTV's inaugural season premiered on 17 June 2011, and ran until 12 August 2011. It showcased a vibrant mix of genres – Carnatic and Hindustani classical music, brand new compositions, reimagined Bollywood hits, and exclusive productions created especially for the show. This nine-episode season, produced by Leslee Lewis, featured a total of 51 songs, culminating in a special "best of season 1" episode. Supavitra Babul served as the director for the season.

=== Season 2 (2012) ===
The second season of Coke Studio @ MTV premiered on 6 July 2012 and concluding on 25 August 2012. It introduced a new format where each episode focused on a specific composer showcasing their original compositions. This season saw a diverse range of 13 music producers, including Agam, Amit Trivedi, Clinton Cerejo, Dhruv Sangari, Ehsaan Noorani and Loy Mendonsa, Hari & Sukhmani, Hitesh Sonik, Karsh Kale, Nitin Sawhney, Papon, Shantanu Moitra, Shilpa Rao, and Zila Khan. Eight episodes aired, followed by two "best of season 2" episodes.

=== Season 3 (2013) ===
Premiering on 1 August 2013, the third season ran until 7 October 2013, featuring eight episodes with a total of 47 songs. It continued the format established in the previous season, with 13 music producers curating their own compositions. The producers included A. R. Rahman, Aditya Balani, Amit Trivedi, Clinton Cerejo, Func., Hitesh Sonik, Orange Street, Papon, Ram Sampath, Salim–Sulaiman, Sonam Kalra, Vijay Prakash, and Winit Tikoo.

=== Season 4 (2015) ===
The fourth season, which aired from 1 March 2015 to 4 October 2015, maintained the format of featuring multiple music producers. This season saw nine producers curate their own compositions, including Amit Trivedi, Anupam Roy, Dhruv Ghanekar, Jatinder Shah, Jeet Gannguli, Manj Musik, Pradeep Giri and Ram Sampath. Additionally, Sachin–Jigar, Salim–Sulaiman and Sunny Brown also contributed to the season.

== Coke Music Live ==
Memu Aagamu (We Won't Stop!)" is a song released on 22 August 2022 featuring vocals by Armaan Malik and Tri.be. The track is composed by Lost Stories and ELLY, with lyrics penned by Kunaal Vermaa, ELLY, and S.TIGER. The music video, directed by Colin D'Cunha, stars Allu Arjun, Armaan Malik, and K-pop group Tri.be. The project management was handled by Motion Content Group, while Dharma Productions oversaw video production, led by producers Karan Johar and Punit Malhotra.

== Revival and Rebranding ==
In 2023, Coke Studio returned to the Indian music scene after an eight-year hiatus following the conclusion of its fourth season. This resurgence was part of a branding initiative led by Coca-Cola India. The series underwent significant changes, rebranding itself as Coke Studio Bharat, potentially signaling a shift in focus towards the nation's musical heritage. This relaunch included the introduction of Coke Studio Tamil, a separate edition dedicated to the Tamil language. Both editions are exclusively available on digital platforms, departing from the televised format of its predecessor, Coke Studio @ MTV. The revamped format aimed to modernize the program's presentation while emphasizing collaborations between diverse artists. Prior to the relaunch, Coca-Cola tested the digital sphere with Coke Studio Bangla in 2022. Arnab Roy, VP of Marketing for India and Southwest Asia, emphasized the preference for a self-owned branded channel over partnerships with video streaming services.

== Coke Studio Tamil ==
=== Season 1 (2023) ===
Coke Studio Tamil's first season began airing on 1 February 2023, concluding its run on 27 July 2023. This season showcased a collection of seven songs curated by Sean Roldan and Arivu. Production management was handled by Open X and Motion Content Group, while Universal Music India partnered in distributing the show.

=== Season 2 (2024) ===
On 20 December 2023, Coca-Cola introduced the second edition of Coke Studio Tamil. This season includes nine tracks and is scheduled for gradual release throughout 2024. The title track, "Idhu Semma Vibe," was released alongside the season's launch. Sean Roldan has returned to curate the season, preserving the artistic direction, while Open X and Motion Content Group have continued their roles in production management, and Universal Music India has remained the distributor.

=== Season 3 (2025) ===
The ongoing third season of "Coke Studio Tamil" premiered on 29 October 2025. The first track was composed by and featured renowned composer Santhosh Narayanan, in his track Thalaivan Oruvan, which also featured Tamil rapper, performer, and artist OfRo, Sri Lankan-Canadian rapper and performer Shan Vincent de Paul, and The Indian Choral Ensemble.

== Coke Studio Bharat ==
=== Season 1 (2023) ===
The first season of "Coke Studio Bharat" began airing on 7 February 2023 and concluded on 9 October 2023. The season was curated by Ankur Tewari, who collaborated with poet and lyricist Kausar Munir and music producer K. J. Singh. Colosceum Media Pvt Ltd managed the visual aspect of the production, while Misfits Inc oversaw audio production. Universal Music India served as the season's executive producer and official distributor.

=== Season 2 (2024) ===
The second season of "Coke Studio Bharat" premiered on 7 February 2023. Ankur Tewari is overseeing the curation of this season, with the creative team comprising lyricists Swanand Kirkire and Kausar Munir, along with sound engineer and music producer K. J. Singh. Universal Music India is managing marketing and distribution, and Colosceum serves as the production house.

== Reception ==
The debut season of Coke Studio @ MTV in 2011, produced by Leslie Lewis, faced criticism despite its blend of mainstream and folk artists. Aditya Swamy, who was then the Executive Vice President and Business Head of MTV India, expressed that requesting a single producer to create 50 songs in 60 days was an excessive expectation. The subsequent seasons, however, garnered praise for improved music quality and composition, exemplified by popular tracks like 'Ki Banu Duniya Da' and 'Laadki' from season 4. Similarly, debut season hits like 'Khalasi' from Coke Studio Bharat and 'Sagavaasi' from Coke Studio Tamil gained significant traction on their respective YouTube channels.

== See also ==
- MTV Unplugged
- Coke Studio Pakistan
- Coke Studio Bangla
