= Aamir Khan filmography =

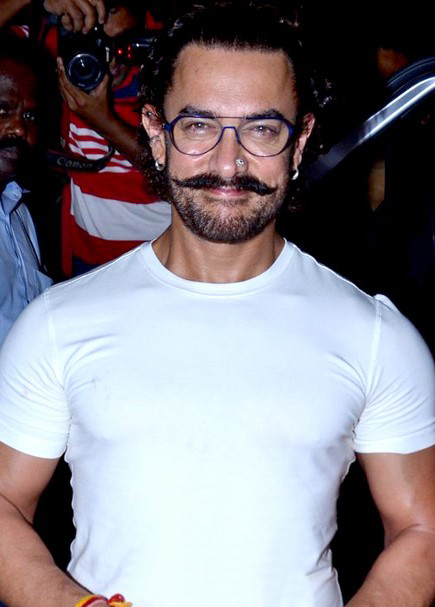
Khan in 2017

Indian actor Aamir Khan first appeared on screen at the age of eight in a minor role in his uncle Nasir Hussain's film Yaadon Ki Baaraat (1973). In 1983, he acted in and worked as an assistant director on Paranoia, a short film directed by Aditya Bhattacharya, following which he assisted Hussain on two of his directorial ventures—Manzil Manzil (1984) and Zabardast (1985). As an adult, Khan's first acting project was a brief role in the 1984 experimental social drama Holi.

Khan's first leading role came opposite Juhi Chawla in the highly successful tragic romance Qayamat Se Qayamat Tak (1988). His performance in the film and in the thriller Raakh (1989) earned him a National Film Award – Special Mention. He went on to establish himself with roles in several lucrative films of the 1990s, including the romantic drama Dil (1990), the romantic comedy Dil Hai Ke Manta Nahin (1991), the coming-of-age sports drama Jo Jeeta Wohi Sikander (1992), the comedy-drama Hum Hain Rahi Pyar Ke (1993), and the romance Raja Hindustani (1996). He also played against type in the Deepa Mehta-directed Canadian-Indian co-production Earth (1998). In 1999, Khan launched a production company, Aamir Khan Productions, whose first release Lagaan (2001) was nominated for the Academy Award for Best Foreign Language Film, and earned him the National Film Award for Best Popular Film. Also in 2001, he starred alongside Saif Ali Khan and Akshaye Khanna in the acclaimed coming-of-age drama Dil Chahta Hai. Lagaan and Dil Chahta Hai are cited in the media as defining films of Hindi cinema. After a three-year hiatus, Khan portrayed the eponymous lead in Mangal Pandey: The Rising (2005), a period film that underperformed at the box office, after which he played leading roles in two top-grossing films of 2006—Fanaa and Rang De Basanti.

Khan made his directorial debut with Taare Zameen Par in 2007, a drama on dyslexia starring Darsheel Safary, in which Khan also played a supporting role. The film proved to be a critical and commercial success, winning him the National Film Award for Best Film on Family Welfare. Khan played a man with anterograde amnesia in the 2008 thriller Ghajini, after which he portrayed an engineering student in the comedy-drama 3 Idiots (2009), and a reclusive artist in the drama Dhobi Ghat (2010), which he also produced. During this period, Khan developed and featured as the host of the television talk show Satyamev Jayate (2012–2014).

Further success came when Khan played the antagonist of the adventure film Dhoom 3 (2013) and starred as the titular alien in the ₹7.4 billion (US$77 million)-grossing satire PK (2014). In 2016, Khan played the father of two young female wrestlers in the sports biopic Dangal, which earned over ₹20 billion (US$210 million) worldwide. Five of Khan's films—Ghajini, 3 Idiots, Dhoom 3, PK, and Dangal— have held records for being the highest-grossing Indian film of all time. Khan's two subsequent releases—the period adventure film Thugs of Hindostan (2018) and the Forrest Gump remake, Laal Singh Chaddha (2022)—emerged as box-office bombs. He made a comeback in 2025 with Sitaare Zameen Par which emerged a major commercial success.

== Films ==
Key
†	Denotes films that have not yet been released

Year	Title	Role	Notes	Ref.
1973	Yaadon Ki Baaraat	Young Ratan	Child artist	
1974	Madhosh	Young Raj	Child artist	
1983	Paranoia		Short film	
1984	Holi	Madan Sharma		
1984	Manzil Manzil	—N/a	Assistant director	
1988	Qayamat Se Qayamat Tak	Rajveer "Raj" Singh		
1989	Raakh	Aamir Hussein		
1989	Love Love Love	Amit		
1990	Awwal Number	Sunny		
1990	Tum Mere Ho	Shiva		
1990	Dil	Raja Prasad		
1990	Deewana Mujh Sa Nahin	Ajay Sharma		
1990	Jawani Zindabad	Shashi Sharma		
1991	Afsana Pyaar Ka	Raj		
1991	Dil Hai Ke Manta Nahin	Raghu Jetley		
1992	Daulat Ki Jung	Rajesh Chaudhry		
1992	Jo Jeeta Wohi Sikandar	Sanjaylal "Sanju" Sharma		
1992	Isi Ka Naam Zindagi	Chotu		
1993	Parampara	Ranbir Prithvi Singh		
1993	Hum Hain Rahi Pyar Ke	Rahul Malhotra		
1993	Damini	Dancer	Cameo	
1993	Pehla Nasha	Himself	Cameo	
1994	Andaz Apna Apna	Amar Manohar		
1995	Baazi	Amar Damjee		
1995	Aatank Hi Aatank	Rohan		
1995	Rangeela	Munna		
1995	Akele Hum Akele Tum	Rohit Kumar		
1996	Raja Hindustani	Raja Hindustani		
1997	Ishq	Raja Ahlawat		
1998	Ghulam	Siddharth "Siddhu" Marathe		
1998	Earth	Dil Navaz	Canadian–Indian film	
1999	Sarfarosh	ACP Ajay Singh Rathod		
1999	Mann	Dev Karan Singh		
2000	Mela	Kishan Pyare		
2001	Lagaan	Bhuvan	Also producer	
2001	Dil Chahta Hai	Akash Malhotra		
2004	Madness in the Desert	Himself	Documentary	
2005	Mangal Pandey: The Rising	Mangal Pandey		
2006	Rang De Basanti	Daljit "DJ" Singh and Chandra Shekhar Azad^{[IV]}^{[VI]}		
2006	Fanaa	Rehan Qadri		
2007	Taare Zameen Par	Ram Shankar Nikumbh	Also director and producer	
2008	Jaane Tu... Ya Jaane Na	—N/a	Producer	
2008	Ghajini	Sanjay Singhania	Also screenwriter	
2009	Luck by Chance	Himself	Cameo	
2009	3 Idiots	Rancho/Phunsukh Wangdu^{[V]}		
2010	Dhobi Ghat	Arun	Also producer	
2010	Peepli Live	—N/a	Producer	
2011	Big in Bollywood	Himself	Documentary	
2011	Delhi Belly	Disco Fighter	Guest appearance in song "I Hate You (Like I Love You)"; also producer	
2012	Talaash: The Answer Lies Within	Surjan Singh Shekhawat	Also producer	
2013	Bombay Talkies	Himself	Special appearance in song "Apna Bombay Talkies"	
2013	Dhoom 3	Sahir Khan and Samar Khan^{[VI]}		
2014	PK	PK		
2015	Dil Dhadakne Do	Pluto Mehra	Voiceover	
2016	Dangal	Mahavir Singh Phogat	Also producer	
2017	Secret Superstar	Shakti Kumar	Also producer	
2018	Thugs of Hindostan	Firangi Mallah		
2021	Koi Jaane Na	Himself	Special appearance in song "Har Funn Maula"	
2022	Laal Singh Chaddha	Laal Singh Chaddha, Veer Singh Chaddha, Jagan Singh Chaddha and Manav Singh Chaddha ^{[VII]}	Also producer	
2022	Salaam Venky	Illusion	Cameo	
2023	Laapataa Ladies	—N/a	Producer	
2025	Sitaare Zameen Par	Gulshan Arora	Also producer	
2025	Coolie	Dahaa	Tamil film; Special appearance	
2026	Happy Patel: Khatarnak Jasoos	Jimmy Mario	Producer; Special appearance	
2026	Ek Din	—N/a	Producer	
2026	Batwara 1947	—N/a	Producer	

== Television ==
Year	Title	Role	Creator(s)	Episode(s)	Notes	Ref.
2012–2014	Satyamev Jayate	Host	Himself	3 seasons		
2012	C.I.D.	Surjan Singh Shekhawat	B. P. Singh	"Red Suitcase Murders"		
2017–2018	Toofan Alaya	Guest	Himself	Season 1 and Season 2		
2019	Rubaru Roshni	Narrator	Svati Chakravarty		Documentary; also producer	
2023	The Romantics	Himself	Smriti Mundhra		Documentary	
2024	The Great Indian Kapil Show	Guest	Kapil Sharma			
2024	Angry Young Men	Himself	Namrata Rao		Documentary	
2025	The Ba***ds of Bollywood	Himself	Aryan Khan	"Movie Mafia"		

== Music video ==
Year	Title	Performer(s)	Director(s)	Album	Ref.
2003	"Jab Bhi Chum Leta Hoon"	Roop Kumar Rathod	Ashok Mehra	Pyar Ka Jashn	
2010	"Phir Mile Sur Mera Tumhara"	Various	—	—	
2022	"Rishi Kapoor Tribute Song"	Various	—	—	

== See also ==
- Awards and nominations received by Aamir Khan

== Footnotes ==
^{^[II]}Khan played the younger version of Tariq Khan's character in the film.
^{^[III]}Khan played the younger version of Mahendra Sandhu's character in the film.
^{^[IV]}Khan played a character who portrays Chandrashekar Azad in a documentary featured in the film.
^{^[V]}Khan played a character who impersonates another man in the film.
^{^[VI]}Khan performed dual roles in the film.

^{^[VII]}Khan performed four roles in the film.
