= Intermission =

Recess between parts of a performance

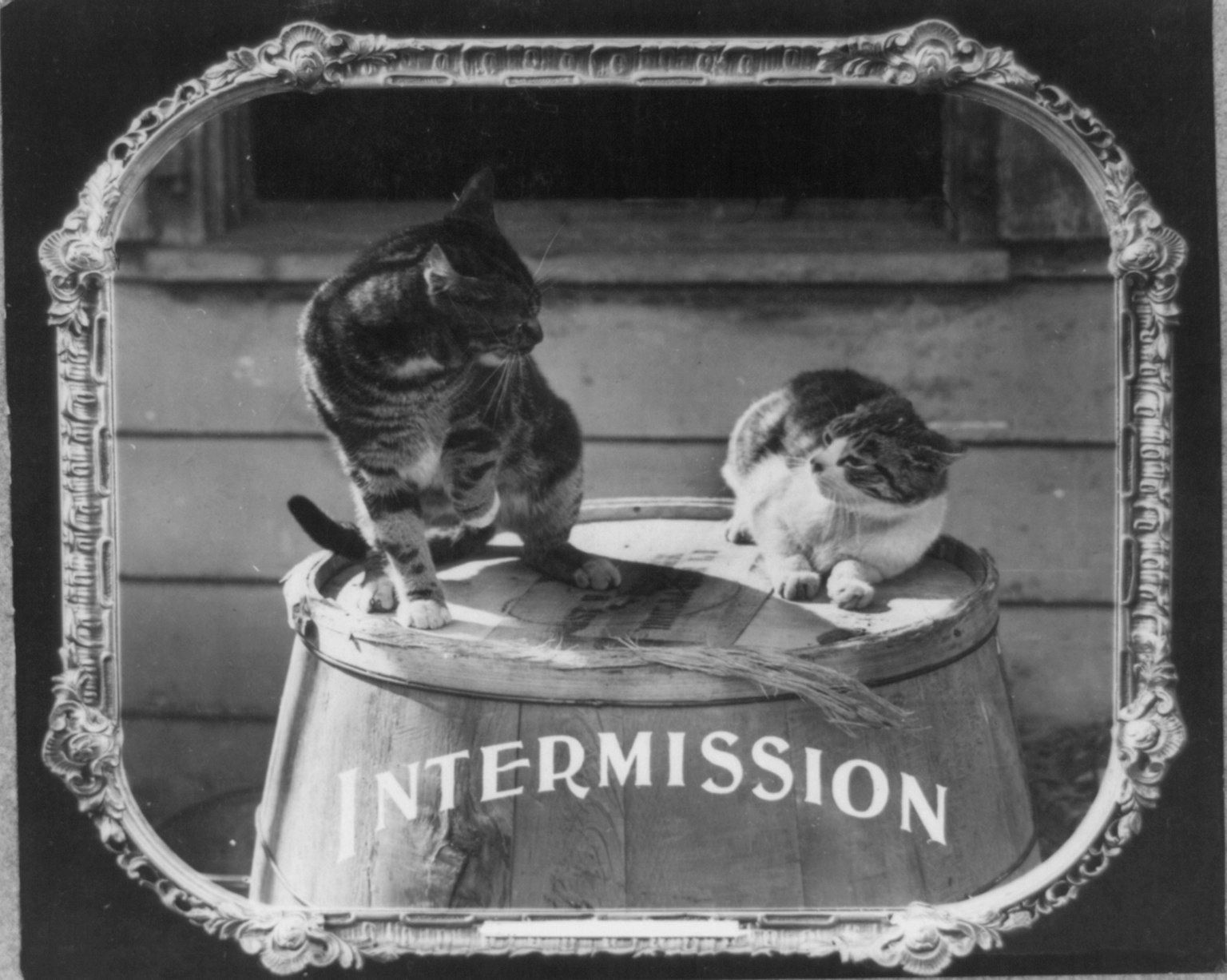
Intermission screen frame during a 1912 film. Used in motion picture theaters as announcement

An intermission, also known as an interval in British and Indian English, is a break between parts of a performance or production, such as for a theatrical play, opera, concert, or film screening. It should not be confused with an entr'acte (French: "between acts"), which, in the 18th century, was a sung, danced, spoken, or musical performance that occurs between any two acts, that is unrelated to the main performance, and that thus in the world of opera and musical theater became an orchestral performance that spans an intermission and leads, without a break, into the next act.

Jean-François Marmontel and Denis Diderot both viewed the intermission as a period in which the action did not in fact stop, but continued off-stage. "The interval is a rest for the spectators; not for the action," wrote Marmontel in 1763. "The characters are deemed to continue acting during the interval from one act to another." However, intermissions are more than just dramatic pauses that are parts of the shape of a dramatic structure. They also exist for more mundane reasons, such as that it is hard for audience members to concentrate for more than two hours at a stretch, and actors and performers (for live action performances at any rate) need to rest. They also afford opportunity for scene and costume changes. Performance venues take advantage of them to sell food and drink.

Psychologically, intermissions allow audiences to pause their suspension of disbelief and return to reality, and are a period during which they can engage critical faculties that they have suspended during the performance itself.

== Plays ==
The term "Broadway Bladder" names "the alleged need of a Broadway audience to urinate every 75 minutes". Broadway Bladder, and other considerations (such as how much revenue a theater would lose at its bar if there were no intermissions), govern the placement of intermissions within performances, and their existence in performances, such as plays, that were not written/created with intermissions in mind.

=== William Shakespeare ===
The plays of William Shakespeare were originally intended for theater performance without intermissions. The placement of intermissions within those plays in modern performances is thus a matter for the play's director. Reviewer Peter Holland analyzed the placement of intermissions in 1997:

- Of The Winter's Tale he noted that there was "as natural a break as anyone could wish for" before the speech of Time as Chorus, and that he had never seen a production that placed an intermission other than at that point.
- Trevor Nunn's production of Measure for Measure in 1991 is given as an example of intermissions placed in the middle of a scene. It stopped halfway through act 3 scene 1, moving some of the lines from later in the scene to before the intermission.
- Performances of King Lear, he observed, often place the intermission "disproportionately late", after the blinding of Gloucester.
- The 1991 RSC production of Julius Caesar directed by Stephen Pimlott is pointed out as noteworthy for its extraordinary intermission length. Pimlott had placed the intermission after act 4 scene 1, after the action leaves Rome. This allowed the striking of the scenery. But it took sometimes as much as forty minutes for stage crew to remove the scenery, which comprised a "massive set of columns and a doorway" designed by Tobias Hoheisel, a period that was longer than the remaining length of the performance, some thirty-five minutes.

Many modern productions of Shakespeare plays have thus eschewed the introduction of an intermission, choosing instead to perform them straight through, as originally intended.

=== Kabuki ===
The intermissions in Kabuki theater can last up to an hour. Because this often results in people returning to their seats several minutes after the performance has resumed, playwrights generally take to writing "filler" scenes for the starts of acts, containing characters and dialogue that are not important to the overall story.

=== Noh ===
In the Noh theatrical tradition, interludes called nakairi are staged between the first and second halves of a performance, during which time kyōgen actors sum up the plot or otherwise further the action through performances known as aikyōgen. These interludes also give the main actors a chance to change costumes and rest.

== Films ==
Intermissions in early films had a practical purpose: they were needed to facilitate the changing of reels. When Les Amours de la reine Élisabeth (The Loves of Queen Elizabeth), starring Sarah Bernhardt, opened on July 12, 1912, in the Lyceum Theatre in New York City, the four reel film was shown in four acts, with an intermission at each reel change.

The technology improved, but as movies became progressively longer, the intermission fulfilled other needs. It gave the audience a breather, and provided the theater management an opportunity to entice patrons to its profitable concession stand. A well-known 1957 animated musical snipe suggested, before the main feature in theaters and during intermission at drive-ins, "let's all go to the lobby to get ourselves a treat". During the 3D film trend of the early 1950s, intermissions were a necessity because even though many theaters used two projectors that could skip intermission by shifting from one reel to the other, 3D films required the use of both projectors – one for each stereoscopic image – and so needed an intermission to change the reels on both projectors.

The built-in intermission has been phased out of Hollywood films, the victim of the demand to pack in more screenings and advances in projector technology which make reel switches either unnoticeable or non-existent (such as digital projection, in which reels do not exist).

=== Indian cinema ===
Despite the phasing out of intermissions in the United States, they have remained prevalent in India. There is a mass reluctance to abolish intermissions as they bring a large revenue to cinemas through customers buying snacks during these periods. The films Sangam and Mera Naam Joker had two intermissions each. Very few Indian films have been screened without intermissions, including Dhobi Ghat, Delhi Belly, That Girl In Yellow Boots and Trapped. Forced intermissions are common during screenings of western films in India.

Indian films shown in cinemas in the United Kingdom also commonly include intermissions, yet in the United States, these films play from start to finish without any pauses in between. Many Indian films released on DVD include the "intermission" card for cinematic screening.

== See also ==
- Film presentation
- Entr'acte
