= List of accolades received by Lagaan =

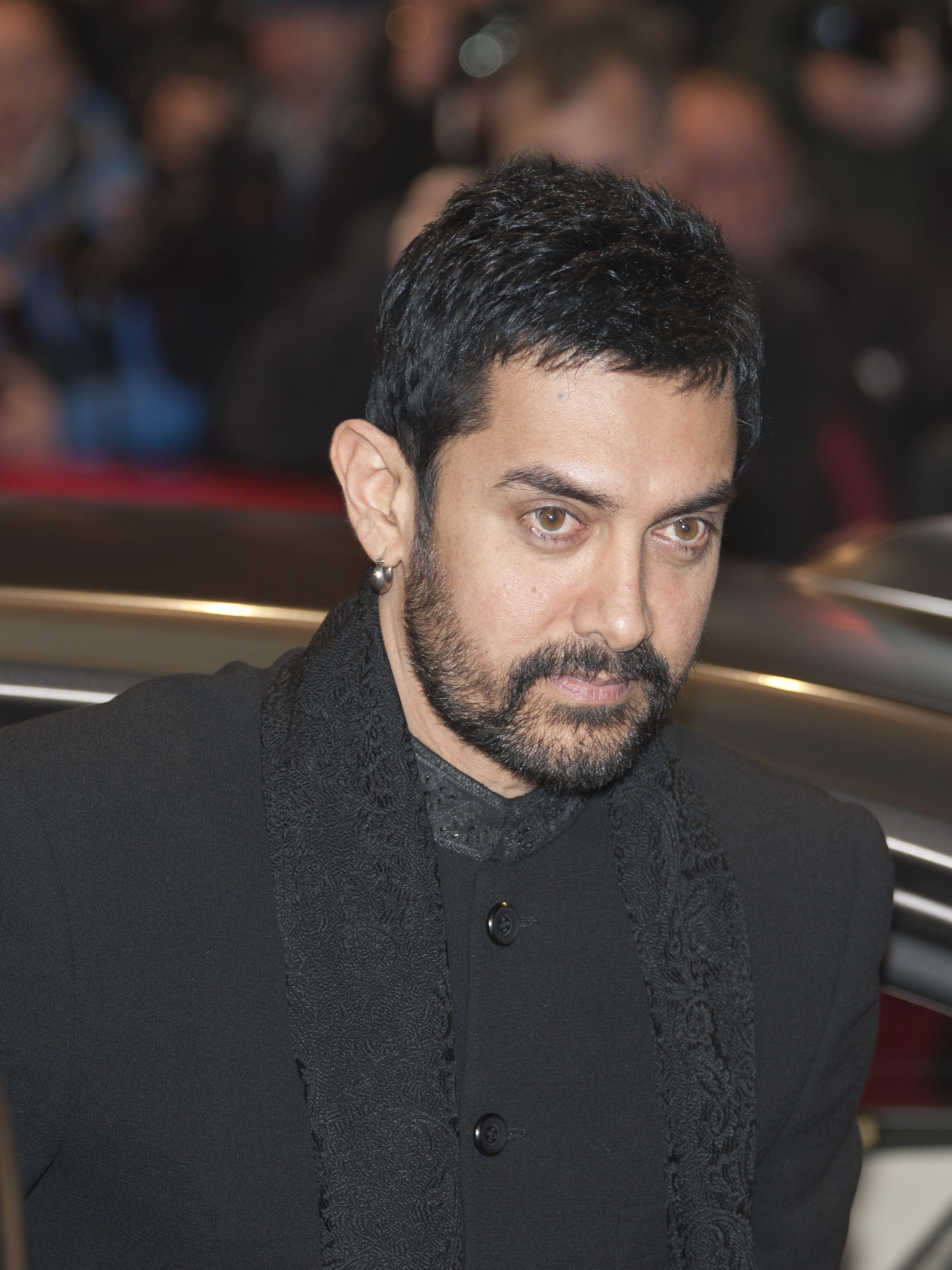
- Aamir Khan received many awards and nominations for producing and acting in the film.
Accolades
Award	Won	Nominated
National Film Awards	8	8
Filmfare Awards	8	8
IIFA Awards	9	14
Zee Cine Awards	8	10
Screen Awards	8	18
Academy Awards	0	1
Portland International Film Festival	1	1
European Film Academy	0	1
Leeds International Film Festival	1	1
Bergen International Film Festival	1	1
Locarno International Film Festival	1	1
NatFilm Festival	1	1
American Choreography Awards	1	1
BFJA Awards	2	0
- Total number of awards and nominations (Note: Certain award groups do not simply award one winner. They recognize several different recipients and have runners-up. Since this is a specific recognition and is different from losing an award, runner-up mentions are considered wins in this award tally.)
Totals	49	66
- References

Lagaan (English: Taxation) is a 2001 Indian sports drama film, written and directed by Ashutosh Gowariker. The film stars Aamir Khan, who also produced the film, and Gracy Singh in the lead roles. Yashpal Sharma, Raghubir Yadav, Rachel Shelley, and Paul Blackthorne feature in supporting roles. The film was edited by Ballu Saluja, with music and cinematography provided by A. R. Rahman, and Anil Mehta respectively. Lagaan is set in India in 1893, during the British Raj. The film tells the story of a small village whose inhabitants are oppressed by high taxes. They are challenged to a cricket match by an arrogant officer as a wager to avoid the taxes.

Lagaan was released on 15 June 2001. The film grossed over ₹1.3 billion (US$13 million) globally on a production budget of ₹250 million (US$2.6 million). It received nominations, and awards in several categories both in India and internationally, with particular praise for its direction, acting and landscapes.

Lagaan was nominated for the Best Foreign Language Film at the 74th Academy Awards, becoming the third Indian film to be nominated in the category after Mother India (1957), and Salaam Bombay! (1988). At the 49th National Film Awards, the film won a total of eight awards, including for Best Popular Film Providing Wholesome Entertainment. It also won eight honours at the 47th Filmfare Awards—Best Film, Best Director, and Best Story awards for Gowariker and the Best Actor award for Khan. At the 8th Screen Awards, Lagaan received nominations for Best Story, and Best Actor, going on to win Best Film and Best Director. The film also won nine awards at the 3rd IIFA Awards, including Best Actor, and Best Movie.

Channel 4 listed Lagaan at number 14 in its list of "Top 50 Films to See Before you Die". In 2010, the film was ranked at number 55 in the Empire list of "The 100 Best Films of World Cinema". In 2011, it was listed in Time's list of "The All-Time 25 Best Sports Movies". The film was also included in CNN-IBN's list of the "100 greatest Indian films of all time" in 2013.

== Accolades ==
Award	Date of ceremony (Note: Each date is linked to the article about the awards held that year, wherever possible.)	Category	Recipient(s) and nominee(s)	Result	Ref.
Academy Awards	March 24, 2002	Best Foreign Language Film	India	Nominated	
American Choreography Awards	20 October 2002	Outstanding Achievement in Feature Film	Saroj Khan, Vaibhavi Merchant, Ganesh Hegde, Terence Lewis, and Raju Khan	Won	
Bengal Film Journalists' Association Awards	2002	Best Director (Hindi)	Ashutosh Gowariker	Won	
Bengal Film Journalists' Association Awards	2002	Best Actor (Hindi)	Aamir Khan	Won	
Bergen International Film Festival	2001	The Jury's Award	Lagaan	Won	
European Film Academy	1 December 2001	European Film Award for Best Non-European Film	Lagaan	Nominated	
Filmfare Awards	February 16, 2002	Best Film	Lagaan	Won	
Filmfare Awards	February 16, 2002	Best Director	Ashutosh Gowariker	Won	
Filmfare Awards	February 16, 2002	Best Story	Ashutosh Gowariker	Won	
Filmfare Awards	February 16, 2002	Best Actor	Aamir Khan	Won	
Filmfare Awards	February 16, 2002	Best Music Director	A. R. Rahman	Won	
Filmfare Awards	February 16, 2002	Best Lyricist	Javed Akhtar	Won	
Filmfare Awards	February 16, 2002	Best Playback Singer – Male	Udit Narayan (for song "Mitwa")	Won	
Filmfare Awards	February 16, 2002	Best Playback Singer – Female	Alka Yagnik (for song "O Rey Chhori")	Won	
International Indian Film Academy Awards	April 6, 2002	Best Film	Lagaan	Won	
International Indian Film Academy Awards	April 6, 2002	Best Director	Ashutosh Gowariker	Won	
International Indian Film Academy Awards	April 6, 2002	Best Actor	Aamir Khan	Won	
International Indian Film Academy Awards	April 6, 2002	Best Story	Ashutosh Gowariker	Won	
International Indian Film Academy Awards	April 6, 2002	Best Actress	Gracy Singh	Nominated	
International Indian Film Academy Awards	April 6, 2002	Best Supporting Actor	Kulbhushan Kharbanda	Nominated	
International Indian Film Academy Awards	April 6, 2002	Best Comedian	Rajesh Vivek	Nominated	
International Indian Film Academy Awards	April 6, 2002	Best Villain	Paul Blackthorne	Nominated	
International Indian Film Academy Awards	April 6, 2002	Best Playback Singer – Male	Udit Narayan (for song "Mitwa")	Nominated	
International Indian Film Academy Awards	April 6, 2002	Best Playback Singer – Female	Asha Bhosle (for song "Radha Kaise Na Jale")	Won	
International Indian Film Academy Awards	April 6, 2002	Best Lyricist	Javed Akhtar	Won	
International Indian Film Academy Awards	April 6, 2002	Best Music Director	A. R. Rahman	Won	
International Indian Film Academy Awards	April 6, 2002	Best Editing	Ballu Saluja	Won	
International Indian Film Academy Awards	April 6, 2002	Best Sound Recording	H. Sridhar	Won	
Leeds International Film Festival	16 October 2001	Audience Award	Lagaan	Won	
Locarno International Film Festival	12 August 2001	Audience Award	Lagaan	Won	
National Film Awards	July 26, 2002	Best Popular Film Providing Wholesome Entertainment	Ashutosh Gowarikar, Aamir Khan	Won	
National Film Awards	July 26, 2002	Best Music Direction	A. R. Rahman	Won	
National Film Awards	July 26, 2002	Best Lyricist	Javed Akhtar (for song "Radha Kaise Na Jale" and "Ghanan Ghanan")	Won	
National Film Awards	July 26, 2002	Best Playback Singer – Male	Udit Narayan (for song "Mitwa") (Note: Also won the award for the song "Jaane Kyon" from Dil Chahta Hai (2001).)	Won	
National Film Awards	July 26, 2002	Best Audiography	H. Sridhar, Nakul Kamte	Won	
National Film Awards	July 26, 2002	Best Costume Design	Bhanu Athaiya	Won	
National Film Awards	July 26, 2002	Best Art Direction	Nitin Chandrakant Desai	Won	
National Film Awards	July 26, 2002	Best Choreography	Raju Khan	Won	
NatFilm Festival	14 April 2002	Audience Award	Lagaan	Won	
Portland International Film Festival	23 February 2002	Audience Award for Best Film	Lagaan	Won	
Screen Awards	18 January 2002	Best Film	Lagaan	Won	
Screen Awards	18 January 2002	Best Director	Ashutosh Gowariker	Won	
Screen Awards	18 January 2002	Best Story	Ashutosh Gowariker	Nominated	
Screen Awards	18 January 2002	Best Screenplay	Ashutosh Gowarikar, Kumar Dave, and Sanjay Daima	Won	
Screen Awards	18 January 2002	Best Dialogue	Ashutosh Gowariker, K. P. Saxena	Nominated	
Screen Awards	18 January 2002	Best Actor	Aamir Khan	Nominated	
Screen Awards	18 January 2002	Most Promising Newcomer – Female	Gracy Singh	Won	
Screen Awards	18 January 2002	Best Villain	Paul Blackthorne	Nominated	
Screen Awards	18 January 2002	Best Art Direction	Nitin Chandrakant Desai	Won	
Screen Awards	18 January 2002	Best Cinematography	Anil Mehta	Won	
Screen Awards	18 January 2002	Best Editing	Ballu Saluja	Won	
Screen Awards	18 January 2002	Best Sound Design	Nakul Kamte	Nominated	
Screen Awards	18 January 2002	Best Playback Singer – Male	Udit Narayan (for song "Mitwa")	Nominated	
Screen Awards	18 January 2002	Best Playback Singer – Female	Asha Bhosle (for song "Radha Kaise Na Jale")	Won	
Screen Awards	18 January 2002	Best Lyricist	Javed Akhtar (for song "Radha Kaise Na Jale")	Nominated	
Screen Awards	18 January 2002	Best Music Director	A. R. Rahman	Nominated	
Screen Awards	18 January 2002	Best Background Music	A. R. Rahman	Nominated	
Screen Awards	18 January 2002	Best Choreography	Saroj Khan	Nominated	
Zee Cine Awards	11 January 2002	Best Film	Ashutosh Gowariker	Won	
Zee Cine Awards	11 January 2002	Best Director	Ashutosh Gowariker	Won	
Zee Cine Awards	11 January 2002	Best Story	Ashutosh Gowariker	Won	
Zee Cine Awards	11 January 2002	Best Actor	Aamir Khan	Won	
Zee Cine Awards	11 January 2002	Best Debut – Female	Gracy Singh	Won	
Zee Cine Awards	11 January 2002	Best Supporting Actress	Rachel Shelley	Nominated	
Zee Cine Awards	11 January 2002	Best Playback Singer – Male	Udit Narayan (for song "Mitwa")	Nominated	
Zee Cine Awards	11 January 2002	Best Playback Singer – Female	Asha Bhosle (for song "Radha Kaise Na Jale")	Won	
Zee Cine Awards	11 January 2002	Best Music Director	A. R. Rahman	Won	
Zee Cine Awards	11 January 2002	Best Lyricist	Javed Akhtar (for song "Radha Kaise Na Jale")	Won	

== See also ==
- List of awards and nominations received by Aamir Khan
- List of Bollywood films of 2001
