= Aamir Khan =

Indian actor and filmmaker (born 1965)

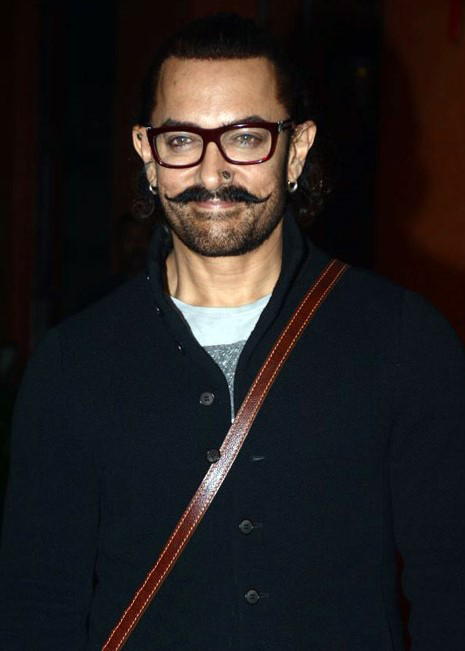
- Khan in 2018
- Born: Aamir Hussain Khan; 14 March 1965 (age 61); Bombay, Maharashtra, India
- Education: Narsee Monjee College
- Occupations: Actor; filmmaker
- Years active: 1973–present
- Organizations: Paani Foundation; Aamir Khan Productions
- Works: Full list
- Spouses: Reena Dutta (m. 1986; div. 2002); Kiran Rao (m. 2005; div. 2021); Gauri Spratt (m. 2026)
- Children: 3, including Junaid Khan
- Father: Tahir Hussain
- Relatives: Khan–Hussain family Philip Spratt (grandfather-in-law)
- Awards: Full list
- Honours: Padma Bhushan (2010); Padma Shri (2003)

Aamir Hussain Khan (Note: While Khan has referred to his full name as Mohammed Aamir Hussain Khan, his legal name as per business filings of his production company omits Mohammed. Wikipedia uses legal name for introduction.) (pronounced [ˈaːmɪr xaːn]; born 14 March 1965) is an Indian actor, filmmaker, and television personality who works in Hindi films. Referred to as "Mr. Perfectionist" in the media, through his career spanning over 30 years, Khan has established himself as one of the most notable actors of Indian cinema. Khan is the recipient of numerous awards, including nine Filmfare Awards, four National Film Awards, and an AACTA Award. He was honoured by the Government of India with the Padma Shri in 2003 and the Padma Bhushan in 2010, and received an honorary title from the Government of China in 2017.

Aamir Khan first appeared on screen as a child actor in his uncle Nasir Hussain's film Yaadon Ki Baaraat (1973). As an adult, his first feature film role was in Holi (1984). He began a full-time acting career with a leading role in Qayamat Se Qayamat Tak (1988). His performance in Raakh (1989) earned him recognition the Special Mention category. He established himself as a leading actor in the 1990s by appearing in a number of commercially successful films, including Dil (1990), Dil Hai Ke Manta Nahin (1991), Jo Jeeta Wohi Sikandar (1992), Hum Hain Rahi Pyar Ke (1993), Rangeela (1995), Akele Hum Akele Tum (1995), Raja Hindustani (1996) for which he won his first Filmfare Award for Best Actor, Ghulam (1998), and Sarfarosh (1999).

In 1999, he founded Aamir Khan Productions, whose first film, Lagaan (2001), was nominated for the Academy Award for Best Foreign Language Film, and earned him a National Film Award for Best Popular Film and two more Filmfare Awards (Best Actor and Best Film). His next Dil Chahta Hai (2001) was a critical and commercial success. After a four-year hiatus, Khan returned to appear in leading roles, notably in Rang De Basanti (2006) and Fanaa (2006). He made his directorial debut with Taare Zameen Par (2007), which won him the Filmfare Awards for Best Film and Best Director. Khan's biggest commercial successes came with Ghajini (2008), 3 Idiots (2009), Dhoom 3 (2013), PK (2014), and Dangal (2016), each having held the record for being the highest-grossing Indian film. (Note: Box Office India reported that the collection was ₹2,024 crore. The Hindustan Times mentioned that the film grossed more than ₹2,200 crore.) Khan won his third Best Actor award at Filmfare for Dangal.

He has a large following, especially in India and China, and has been described by Newsweek as "the most bankable movie star in the world". He has been regularly listed among The 500 Most Influential Muslims of the world. He also created and hosted the television talk show Satyamev Jayate. His work as a social reformer earned him an appearance on the Time 100 list of most influential people in the world in 2013.

== Early life and background ==
Mohammed Aamir Hussain Khan was born on 14 March 1965 in Bombay to Tahir Hussain, a film producer, and Zeenat Hussain from Varanasi. He is the second of four siblings; he has a younger brother—Faisal Khan—and two sisters, Farhat and Nikhat Khan.

His family has roots from Herat in Afghanistan; Khan's paternal grandfather was a schoolteacher from a Pashtun zamindar background, while his paternal grandmother was an Arab tracing her roots to Jeddah in Saudi Arabia and a niece of Maulana Abul Kalam Azad. Khan has expressed his wish to make a movie about Maulana Azad. Najma Heptulla, the 16th Governor of Manipur and the grand-niece of Maulana Azad, is Khan's cousin.

Several of his relatives were members of the Hindi film industry, including his late paternal uncle, producer-director Nasir Hussain. Nasir's son Mansoor Khan is a director who has cast Aamir in most of his movies while Nasir's grandson through his daughter, Imran Khan, is a former Hindi film actor. Through his mother, Khan is a nephew of the Fazli brothers, who have been filmmakers in both India and Pakistan.

As a child actor, he appeared on screen in two minor roles. At the age of eight, he appeared in Yaadon Ki Baaraat (1973), which was the first masala film in Bollywood. The following year, he portrayed the younger version of Mahendra Sandhu's character in Madhosh. Khan attended J.B. Petit School for his pre-primary education, later switching to St. Anne's High School, Bandra, until the eighth grade, and completed his ninth and tenth grades at Bombay Scottish School, Mahim. He played tennis in state level championships and became a state-level champion. He professed he was "much more into sports than studies". He completed his twelfth grade at Mumbai's Narsee Monjee College, and described his childhood as "tough" due to the financial problems his father had, as his film productions were mostly unsuccessful. He said, "There would be at least 30 calls a day from creditors calling for their money," and that he was always at risk of being expelled from school for non-payment of fees.

At the age of sixteen, Khan got involved in the experimental process of making a 40-minute silent film, Paranoia, which was directed by his school friend Aditya Bhattacharya. The film was funded by filmmaker Shriram Lagoo, an acquaintance of Bhattacharya, who provided them with a few thousand rupees. His parents did not want him to make films and wished that he would instead pursue a "steady" career as an engineer or doctor; for that reason, the shooting schedule of Paranoia was kept secret. In the film, he played the lead role alongside actors Neena Gupta and Victor Banerjee while simultaneously assisting Bhattacharya. He said that the experience encouraged him to pursue a career in film.

Khan subsequently joined a theatre group called Avantar, where he worked backstage for over a year. He made his stage debut with a small role in the company's Gujarati play, Kesar Bina, at Prithvi Theatre. He went on to act in two of their Hindi plays, and one English play, which was titled Clearing House. After completing high school, Khan decided to discontinue studying, and work instead as an assistant director to Hussain on the Hindi films Manzil Manzil and Zabardast.

In 2007, he lost a custody battle for his younger brother Faisal to their father, Tahir Hussain, who died on 2 February 2010.

As a practising Muslim, he along with his mother Zeenat, performed Hajj, an annual Islamic pilgrimage to Mecca, Saudi Arabia, and a mandatory religious duty for Muslims, in 2013.

== Acting career ==
=== 1984–1989: Early struggle and breakthrough ===
In addition to assisting Hussain, he acted in documentaries directed by the students of the Film and Television Institute of India. Director Ketan Mehta noticed Khan in those films, and offered him a role in the low-budget experimental film Holi. Featuring an ensemble cast of newcomers, Holi was based on a play by Mahesh Elkunchwar, and dealt with the practice of ragging in India. The New York Times said that the film was "melodramatic" but "very decently and exuberantly performed by the nonprofessional actors". Khan played a rowdy college student, an "insignificant" role that was described by CNN-IBN as "lack[ing] in finesse".

Holi failed to attract a broad audience, but Hussain and his son Mansoor cast him as the leading man in Mansoor's directorial debut Qayamat Se Qayamat Tak (1988) opposite Juhi Chawla. The film is a tale of unrequited love and parental opposition, with Aamir Khan portraying Raj, a "clean-cut, wholesome boy-next-door". It became a major commercial success, and catapulted both Khan and Chawla to stardom. It received seven Filmfare Awards including a Best Male Debut trophy for him.

Raakh, a crime thriller from Bhattacharya that was filmed before the production of Qayamat Se Qayamat Tak, was released in 1989. Despite a poor reception at the box office, the film was critically acclaimed. Khan was awarded a National Film Award – Special Jury Award / Special Mention for his performances in both Qayamat Se Qayamat Tak and Raakh. Later that year, he reunited with Chawla for the romantic comedy Love Love Love, an average grosser .

=== 1990–2004: Rise to prominence and hiatus ===
Khan had five releases in 1990. He found no success in Awwal Number, Deewana Mujh Sa Nahin and Jawani Zindabad. However, Tahir Hussain's fantasy drama Tum Mere Ho again co-starring Chawla was a hit and Indra Kumar's romantic drama Dil opposite Madhuri Dixit emerged a blockbuster as well as the highest-earning film of 1990. This was followed by a leading role alongside Pooja Bhatt in Mahesh Bhatt's Dil Hai Ke Manta Nahin, a remake of the American film It Happened One Night, which too was a box office hit.

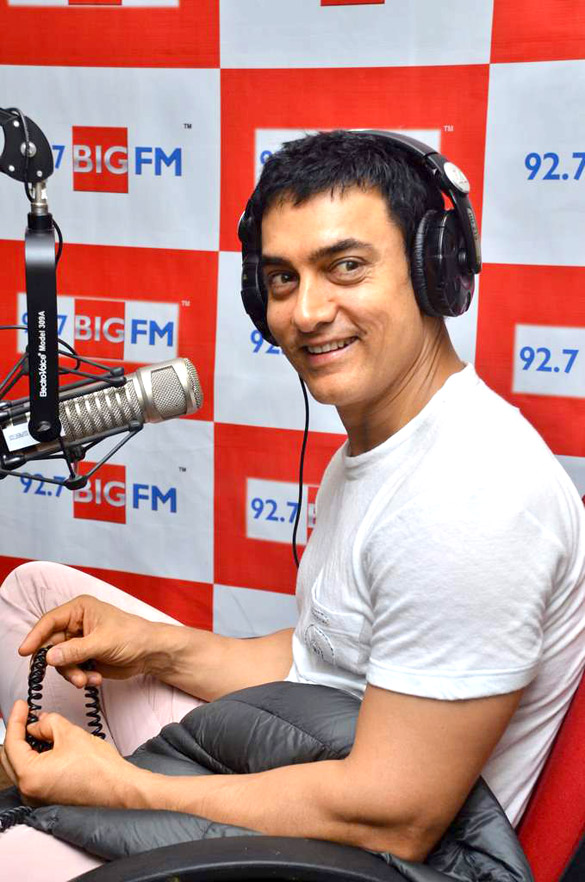
Khan at 92.7 BIG FM radio station.

He appeared in several other films in the early 1990s, including Jo Jeeta Wohi Sikandar (1992), Hum Hain Rahi Pyar Ke (1993) (for which he also wrote the screenplay), and Rangeela (1995). Most of these films were successful critically and commercially. Other successes include Andaz Apna Apna (1994) alongside Salman Khan; at the time of its release, the movie was reviewed unfavorably by critics, but over the years has gained cult status. In 1993, Khan also appeared in Yash Chopra's action drama film Parampara. Despite having an ensemble cast that included Sunil Dutt, Vinod Khanna, Raveena Tandon, and Saif Ali Khan, the film failed to find a wide audience and became a critical and commercial failure. Khan was also cast in Time Machine; however, due to financial constraints, the film was shelved and remained unreleased.

He continued to act in just one or two films a year, which was an unusual trait for a mainstream Hindi cinema actor. His only release in 1996 was the Dharmesh Darshan directed huge blockbuster Raja Hindustani, in which he was paired opposite Karisma Kapoor. The film earned him his first Filmfare Award for Best Actor after seven previous nominations, and went on to become the biggest hit of the year, as well as the third-highest grossing Indian film of the 1990s. Adjusted for inflation, Raja Hindustani is the fourth highest-grossing film in India since the 1990s. In 1997, he acted in Ishq, which proved to be another blockbuster for him. The following year, Khan appeared in Vikram Bhatt's action thriller Ghulam, for which he also did playback singing. The film received positive response from reviewers and went on to become a hit at the box office.

John Mathew Matthan's Sarfarosh, Khan's first film in 1999, was also a commercially successful venture. The film and Khan were highly appreciated by movie critics, as was his role in Deepa Mehta's Canadian-Indian art house film Earth (1998). Earth was internationally acclaimed by critics such as Roger Ebert for Khan's portrayal of Dil Nawaz ("Ice Candy Man"). His first release for the 2000s, Mela, in which he acted alongside his brother Faisal, was both a box office and critical failure.

In 2001, he produced and starred in Lagaan, and received a nomination for Best Foreign Language Film at the 74th Academy Awards. The film also received critical acclaim at several international film festivals, in addition to winning numerous Indian awards such as a National Film Award. Khan also won his second Filmare Award for Best Actor.

Lagaan's success was followed by Dil Chahta Hai later that year. The film was written and directed by then-debutant Farhan Akhtar, and won the 2001 Filmfare Award for Best Film (Critics). He then took a four-year break from Bollywood after his divorce from Reena Dutta.

=== 2005–2017: Return to films and global success ===
Khan made a comeback in 2005 as the lead in Ketan Mehta's Mangal Pandey: The Rising, which was screened at the Cannes Film Festival.

Rakeysh Omprakash Mehra's Rang De Basanti was Khan's first film in 2006. His performance was critically acclaimed, earning him a Filmfare Critics Award for Best Actor and various nominations for Best Actor. The film went on to become one of the highest-grossing films of the year, and was selected as India's official entry to the Oscars. Although the film was not shortlisted as a nominee for the Oscar, it received a nomination for the BAFTA Award for Best Film Not in the English Language at the BAFTA Awards in England. In Khan's next movie, Fanaa (2006), he played a Kashmiri insurgent terrorist, his second antagonistic role after Earth, the role offered him creative possibilities to try something different.

His 2007 film, Taare Zameen Par, was also produced by him and marked his directorial debut. The film, which was the second release from Aamir Khan Productions, opened to positive responses from critics and audiences. His performance was well-received, though he was particularly applauded for his directing. He received the Filmfare Awards for Best Director and Best Film of 2007, as well as the National Film Award for Best Film on Family Welfare. The film won other awards, including the 2008 Zee Cine Awards and 4th Apsara Film & Television Producers Guild Awards. The film was initially acclaimed as India's official entry for the 2009 Academy Awards Best Foreign Film.

In 2008, Khan appeared in the film Ghajini. The film was a major commercial success and became the highest-grossing Bollywood movie of that year. For his performance in the film, he received several Best Actor nominations at various award ceremonies as well as his fifteenth Filmfare Best Actor nomination.

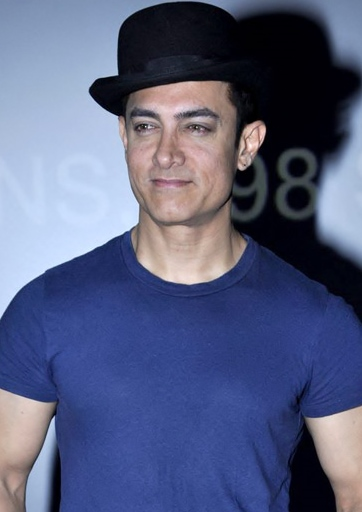
Aamir Khan at the trailer launch of Dhoom 3 in 2013.

In 2009, he appeared in 3 Idiots as Ranchodas Chanchad. The film became the highest-grossing Bollywood film ever at the time, and broke the previous record set by Ghajini. 3 Idiots was one of the few Indian films to become a success in East Asian markets such as China and Japan at the time, making it the highest-grossing Bollywood film ever in overseas markets. In May 2012, it was the first Indian film to be officially released on YouTube. The film won six Filmfare Awards (including Best Film and Best Director), ten Star Screen Awards, eight IIFA Awards, and three National Film Awards. Overseas, it won the Grand Prize at Japan's Videoyasan Awards, and was nominated for Best Outstanding Foreign Language Film at the Japan Academy Awards and Best Foreign Film at China's Beijing International Film Festival.

Aamir Khan has been credited with opening up the Chinese markets for Indian films. His father Tahir Hussain previously had success in China with Caravan, but Indian films declined in the country afterwards, until he opened up the Chinese market for Indian films in the early 21st century. Lagaan became the first Indian film to have a nationwide release there. When 3 Idiots released in China, the country was only the 15th largest film market partly due to China's widespread pirate DVD distribution at the time, which introduced the film to most Chinese audiences, becoming a cult hit in the country. It became China's 12th favourite film of all time, according to ratings on Chinese film review site Douban, with only one domestic Chinese film (Farewell My Concubine) ranked higher. As a result, he gained a large growing Chinese fanbase. After 3 Idiots went viral, several of his other films, such as Taare Zameen Par and Ghajini also gained a cult following. By 2013, China grew to become the world's second largest film market (after the United States), contributing to Khan's box office success with Dhoom 3 (2013), PK (2014), and Dangal (2016).

He appeared next in the psychological crime thriller, Talaash: The Answer Lies Within. Directed Reema Kagti and produced by Excel Entertainment and his own production house, it costarred two of his frequent co-stars; Kareena Kapoor and Rani Mukerji. Khan, who never knew how to swim went under rigorous training for this underwater sequence. He was trained for 3 months under a specialist trainer and went well prepared for the shoot. According to Box Office India, Talaash: The Answer Lies Within grossed ₹912 million net by the end of its run and was declared a "semi-hit".

His next venture was Dhoom 3 with Yash Raj Films, which he considered to be the most difficult role of his career. The film was released worldwide on 20 December 2013. Box Office India declared Dhoom 3 "the biggest hit of 2013" after two days of release, with the film grossing ₹2 billion (US$34.13 million) worldwide in three days and ₹4 billion (US$68.26 million) worldwide in ten days, making it the highest-grossing Bollywood film of all time.

In 2014, he appeared as the eponymous alien in Rajkumar Hirani's comedy-drama PK. The film received critical acclaim and emerged as the 4th highest-grossing Bollywood film of all time. Raja Sen called the film a "triumph" and said: "Aamir Khan is exceptional in PK, creating an irresistibly goofy character and playing him with absolute conviction." The film won two Filmfare Awards, and in Japan received a top award at the 9th Tokyo Newspaper Film Awards event held by Tokyo Shimbun.

In 2016, he produced and starred in Dangal, and was cast as wrestler Mahavir Singh Phogat. He played him at different ages, from 20 to 60 years old; he weighed 98 kg to portray the older Phogat before losing weight to play the younger version. The film received positive reviews from critics and emerged as the highest-grossing Bollywood film of all time domestically, surpassing PK, making it the fifth time he had achieved this feat. Dangal also became an overseas blockbuster success in China, where it was the 16th highest-grossing film of all time, the 8th highest-grossing foreign film, and the highest-grossing non-Hollywood foreign film. Worldwide, it became the fifth highest-grossing non-English language film of all time, and gave him one of the highest salaries for a non-Hollywood actor at $42 million. Dangal has also been watched over 350 million times on Chinese streaming platforms. The film won him two more Filmfare Awards (Best Film and his third Best Actor award).

In October 2017, he starred in a supporting role in his production Secret Superstar. The film went on to become one of the most profitable films of all time, grossing est. ₹876 crore (US$94 million) worldwide on a limited budget of est. ₹20 crore (US$2.1 million) and is the highest-grossing Indian film featuring a female protagonist.

=== 2018–present: Career slump and limited success ===
In November 2018, he starred alongside Amitabh Bachchan in the action-adventure film Thugs of Hindostan. The film received negative reviews from critics. Produced at an estimated budget of ₹300 crore (US$46.07 million), it is one of the most expensive Bollywood films. the film grossed ₹335 crore ($35 million) at the worldwide box office and was considered a financial failure.

In March 2019, on his 54th birthday, Aamir Khan confirmed that he would be seen next in Laal Singh Chaddha, an adaptation of Forrest Gump. The film features him in the lead and is directed by Advait Chandan, who previously directed Khan in Secret Superstar. The film's release on 11 August 2022 marked Khan's return after a four-year hiatus, opening to mixed reviews from critics. The film flopped miserably at the box office and was declared a "disaster". In an interview with Hindustan Times, Khan expressed sorrow over the failure of Laal Singh Chaddha, stating, "I made so many mistakes in this film on so many levels. Thank God I made these mistakes in just one film."

After another three year hiatus, Khan played a suspended basketball coach who must serve community service by helping a team of players with disabilities, in Sitaare Zameen Par opposite Genelia D'Souza. Saibal Chatterjee noted, "Khan effortlessly slips into the character of a temperamental man who is often mocked for his short stature." The film did a lifetime business of ₹266.49 crore, thus emerging a hit. The film's success was attributed to a modest budget and positive reception for its portrayal of neurodivergence, however, it underperformed compared to Khan's peak years.

== Film production and direction ==
=== Aamir Khan Productions ===
As a screenwriter, he first co-wrote the screenplay and script for Hum Hain Rahi Pyar Ke, where he also starred in the lead role. His first project as a producer under the banner of Aamir Khan Productions was the 2001 film Lagaan. It was selected as India's official entry to the 74th Academy Awards in the Best Foreign Language Film category, for which it became India's third nominee ever; it won the National Film Award for Most Popular Film, an award shared between Khan and the film's director, Ashutosh Gowariker. For producing the documentary Madness in the Desert on the making of Lagaan, he and director Satyajit Bhatkal were awarded the National Film Award for Best Exploration/Adventure Film at the 51st National Film Awards ceremony. Khan wrote the climax of Rang De Basanti (2006), which he also starred in.

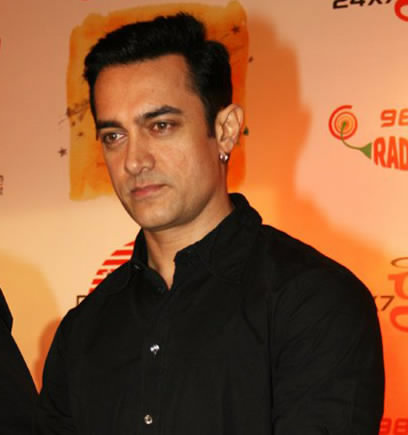
Khan at a promotional event for Taare Zameen Par

In 2007, he directed and produced Taare Zameen Par, which marked his directorial debut. He also played a supporting role in the film. The film was conceived and developed by Amole Gupte and Deepa Bhatia. The movie was critically acclaimed and a box office success. Taare Zameen Par won the 2008 Filmfare Best Movie Award as well as a number of other Filmfare and Star Screen Awards. Khan's work also won him the Best Director. In 2008, his nephew Imran Khan debuted in the film Jaane Tu... Ya Jaane Na under his production house. The film was a big hit in India, and earned Khan another nomination for Best Film at Filmfare. He also co-wrote the blockbuster film Ghajini, which he starred in; Khan made alterations to the original 2005 Tamil film and rewrote the climax. In 2010, he released Peepli Live, which was selected as India's official entry for the 83rd Academy Awards' Best Foreign Film category.

In 2011, he released his home production Dhobi Ghat, an art house film directed by Rao. In the same year, Khan co-produced the English language black comedy film Delhi Belly with UTV Motion Pictures. The film opened to critical acclaim and was a commercial success, with a domestic revenue of over ₹550 million (US$11.78 million). In 2012, he starred in Reema Kagti's neo-noir mystery film Talaash, which was a joint production of Excel Entertainment and Aamir Khan Productions. The film was declared a semi-hit in India and accumulated a worldwide gross of ₹1.74 billion (US$32.56 million).

His next production was Secret Superstar, which became one of the most profitable films ever in proportion to its limited budget. In China, Secret Superstar broke Dangal's record for the highest-grossing opening weekend by an Indian film, cementing Khan's status as a superstar in China Secret Superstar is the third highest-grossing Indian film of all time With his films giving serious competition to Hollywood in the Chinese market, the success of films such as Dangal and Secret Superstar drove up the buyout prices of Indian film imports for Chinese distributors. Khan's earnings for Secret Superstar from the Chinese box office is estimated to be ₹190 crore (US$27.78 million), higher than what any other Indian actor-producer has ever earned from a film. The film has increased Aamir Khan's Chinese box office total to $346.5 million (₹2,231 crore).

Khan co-produced the 2024 release Laapataa Ladies, alongside wife Kiran Rao and Jyoti Deshpande. Directed by Kiran Rao, it was a satire on the state of women in rural marital affairs, and starred Nitanshi Goel, Pratibha Ranta, Sparsh Shrivastav, Chhaya Kadam and Ravi Kishan. The film premiered at the 2023 Toronto International Film Festival, and released theatrically in 2024. It received widespread critical praise and had further success following its release on Netflix. It garnered 13.8 million views on the platform in just a month and became the 2nd most watched Indian release of 2024. The film was later chosen as the Indian entry for the Best International Feature Film for the 97th Academy Awards, but was not nominated.

Khan produced the directorial debut of comedian Vir Das, Happy Patel: Khatarnak Jasoos, which starred Das himself, Mona Singh, Mithila Palkar, Imran Khan and a cameo appearance by Khan. It was released on 16 January 2026. Khan is also producing Batwara 1947 which will be directed by Rajkumar Santoshi and stars Sunny Deol, Preity Zinta and Shabana Azmi in lead roles. A film adaptation of Asghar Wajahat's play Jis Lahore Nai Vekhya, O Jamya E Nai (transl. from Punjabi: You haven't truly lived until you've experienced Lahore), it will be set against the backdrop of 1947 Partition of India. It is set to release on 14 August 2026. The film was initially titled Lahore 1947, and was reportedly changed to Batwara 1947 to avoid political controversy.

Films produced under Aamir Khan ProductionsKey: † / Denotes films that have not yet been released
Year	Title	Director	Notes
2001	Lagaan	Ashutosh Gowariker	
2007	Taare Zameen Par	Aamir Khan	Co-produced with PVR Pictures
2008	Jaane Tu... Ya Jaane Na	Abbas Tyrewala	Co-produced with PVR Pictures
2010	Peepli Live	Anusha Rizvi, Mahmood Farooqui	
2010	Dhobi Ghat	Kiran Rao	
2011	Delhi Belly	Abhinay Deo	Co-produced with UTV Motion Pictures, Ferocious Attack Cow
2012	Talaash: The Answer Lies Within	Reema Kagti	Co-produced with Excel Entertainment
2016	Dangal	Nitesh Tiwari	Co-produced with Walt Disney Pictures India
2017	Secret Superstar	Advait Chandan	Co-produced with Zee Studios
2019	Rubaru Roshni	Svati Chakravarty Bhatkal	Documentary film
2022	Laal Singh Chaddha	Advait Chandan	Co-produced with Paramount Pictures, Viacom18 Studios
2023	Laapataa Ladies	Kiran Rao	Co-produced with Jio Studios, Kindling Pictures
2025	Sitaare Zameen Par	R. S. Prasanna	
2026	Happy Patel: Khatarnak Jasoos	Vir Das, Kavi Shastri	
2026	Ek Din	Sunil Pandey	
2026	Batwara 1947	Rajkumar Santoshi	

=== Television ===
Aamir Khan made his television debut with his talk show, Satyamev Jayate, which dealt with social issues, on 6 May 2012. On the radio, Khan said that in view of a phenomenal public response, he would come up with a second season of the show. The show went live simultaneously on StarPlus, Star World, and national broadcaster Doordarshan in the 11 am Sunday slot in eight languages, being the first to do so in India. 'It opened to positive reviews and feedback from social activists, media houses, doctors, and film and television personalities. Khan was also praised for his effort. Despite the initial hype and being labelled as the channel's most ambitious project to date, the initial viewership figures were not very encouraging; the show received an average television rating of 2.9 (with a sample size of 14.4 million, it was watched by only 20% of TV viewers) in the six metros in its debut episode on 6 May. The rating was lower than those of most other celebrity-hosted shows at the time.

== In the media ==
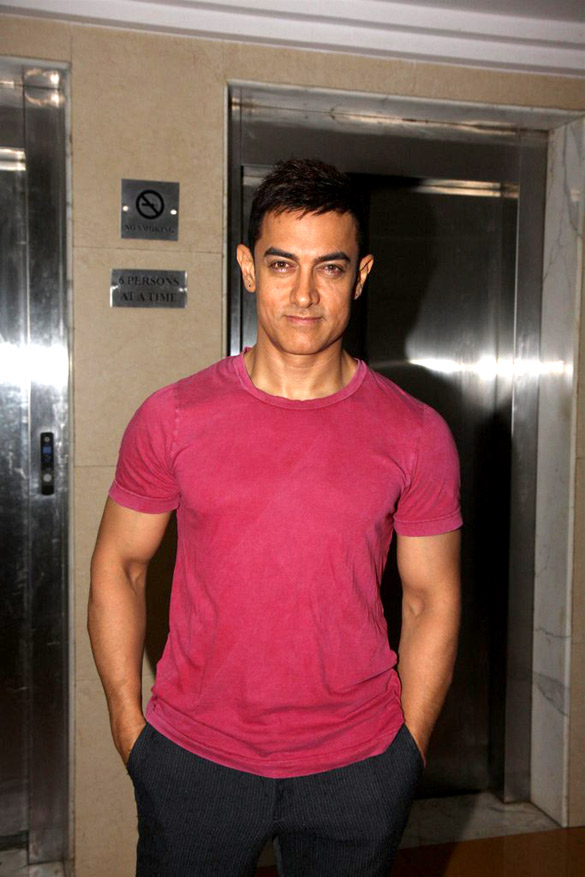
Khan at Satyamev Jayate press conference

In a 2009 interview, Aamir Khan stated that he tends to take an independent approach to the world of filmmaking, noting that he does not "do different things; I try to do it in a different manner. I think every person should follow his/her dream and try and make it possible to create an ability to achieve it backed by its practicality." He also said that he is more interested in the process of filmmaking than in the result: "For me, the process is more important, more joyful. I would like to have my entire concentration on the process right from the first step."

Aamir Khan has a reputation for avoiding award ceremonies and not accepting any popular Indian film awards. Although he has been nominated many times, Khan has not attended any Indian film award ceremonies and has stated that "Indian film awards lack credibility". When asked about the selection procedure and authenticity of popular Indian film awards, he replied, "Fact is that I have no objections to film awards. I just feel that if I don't value a particular film award, then I won't attend it either. Apart from the National Film Awards, I don't see any other award ceremony that I should give value to. My personal experience about these award ceremonies is that I don't trust them. I have no faith in them so I would prefer to stay away."

In 2007, he was invited to have a wax imitation of himself put on display at Madame Tussauds in London. Khan declined, saying, "It's not important to me ... people will see my films if they want to. Also, I cannot deal with so many things, I have bandwidth only for that much." He also endorsed brands including Coca-Cola, Godrej, Titan Watches, Tata Sky, Toyota Innova, Samsung, Monaco Biscuits, and Snapdeal.

In April 2013, he was among Time magazine's list of the 100 Most Influential People in the World. Khan was featured on the cover of Time's Asia edition in the September 2012 issue with the title "Khan's Quest" – "He is breaking the Bollywood mold by tackling India's social evils. Can an actor change a nation?" In addition to being highly popular in India, he is also highly popular overseas, particularly in China, the second largest movie market. He is the most followed Indian national on Chinese social media site Sina Weibo, above Indian prime minister Narendra Modi. Khan is also popular in Turkey, Hong Kong, and Singapore, among many other countries.

In February 2015, Aamir Khan stated his views on a popular online comedy group All India Bakchod for its celebrity roast episode. He said, "I completely believe in freedom of speech, no issues. But we have to understand that we all have a certain responsibility. When I heard what was being described to me I felt it was a violent event." He further said violence is not just physical but it has verbal aspects to it. He called the roast a shameless act, and even called out his friends from the film industry—Karan, Ranveer, and Arjun.

In Indian media, he is often referred to as "Mr. Perfectionist" for his dedication to his work. In Chinese media, he is often referred to as a "national treasure of India" or "conscience of India", due to much of his work tackling various social issues that are pervasive in Indian society, some of which are also relevant to Chinese society, in a way that domestic Chinese films often do not portray. His work is highly regarded in China, with films such as Taare Zameen Par (2007), 3 Idiots (2009) and Dangal (2016), as well as his television show Satyamev Jayate (2012–2014), being some of the highest-rated productions on Douban. In China, Khan is known for being associated with quality cinema and committed to social causes, and is often seen as an activist-actor. In the past, Chinese media used to refer to him as "India's Andy Lau", but as Khan gained more familiarity with mainstream Chinese audiences, younger fans have often referred to him by the moniker "Uncle Aamir" or "Mishu". He has become a household name in China, where he is currently the most famous Indian. His book I'll Do it My Way is commonly found in bookstores across China, while Chinese retailers sell merchandise ranging from "Uncle Aamir" smartphone cases to Dhoom 3-style black hats. His effect in China has drawn comparisons with previous Indian cultural icons in the country, including the Bengali writer Rabindranath Tagore, and actors Raj Kapoor and Nargis.

In September 2025, Khan publicly criticised the growing trend of Bollywood actors demanding that film producers cover their personal expenses, such as the salaries of cooks, trainers, drivers, and other support staff. He argued that while costs directly connected to filmmaking—like costumes, hair, and makeup—are reasonable for producers to bear, personal lifestyle expenses should remain the responsibility of actors themselves. Expressing concern over this practice, Khan questioned, "Where will this stop?" and warned that such expectations could extend to unreasonable demands like producers paying for actors' children's school fees.

== Humanitarian causes ==
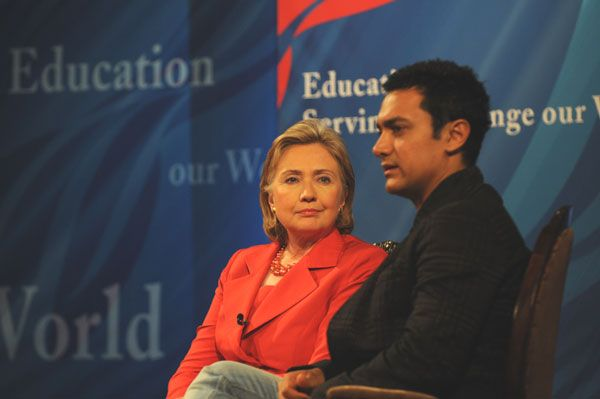
Khan with United States Secretary of State Hillary Clinton in 2009

In April 2006, Aamir Khan participated in the demonstrations put up by the Narmada Bachao Andolan committee after the Gujarat government's decision to raise the height of the Narmada dam. He was quoted to support adivasis (tribes), who might be displaced from their homes. Later he faced protests and a partial ban on his film Fanaa, but the Prime Minister of India, Manmohan Singh, supported him by saying, "Everyone has the freedom of expression. If someone says something on a particular subject, that doesn't mean you should start protesting." Aamir also lent his support to the Janlokpal Bill Movement led by Anna Hazare in August 2011.

He has been supporting common causes; when asked about views on the entertainment tax in the 2012 budget, Khan said, "I don't want any reduction in that, all I expect is focus on education and nutrition." He quit the GOI's copyrights panels in February 2010 after facing sharp differences with other members. During the promotion of 3 Idiots, he journeyed to diverse parts of India, mostly to small towns, noting that "filmmakers from Mumbai don't understand small-town India". This experience of reaching out to "regional India" was extended in Satyamev Jayate. On 16 July 2012, Khan met the prime minister and the minister for social justice and empowerment, and discussed the plight of manual scavengers and sought eradication of manual scavenging in the country.

On 30 November 2011, he was appointed national brand ambassador of UNICEF to promote child nutrition. He is part of the government-organised IEC campaign to raise awareness about malnutrition. He is also known for supporting causes such as feminism and improved education in India, which are themes in several of his films. His crossover success in China has been described as a form of Indian soft power, helping to improve China–India relations, despite political tensions between the two nations (such as Doklam and the Maldives), with Khan stating he wants to help "improve India-China ties". Due to Khan being a household name in China, he has been considered to be India's brand ambassador to China by the Indian commerce ministry, which may contribute to reducing the trade deficit with China.

In 2016, Aamir Khan came up with the Maharashtra government to make the state drought-free in the next five years. He has been doing shramdaan for the last 3 years. He asked people to come to join him in this cause and become a Jal Mitra by doing shramdaan. While explaining to journalists, Khan said, "the reason why popular TV show Satyamev Jayate did not go on air was not because of Court's verdict, but because all the producers, directors and talents working on this show were busy in this water project. For us, the water conservation project in the State is the most important initiative." He is a co-founder of Paani Foundation with Rao. The foundation is a non-profit, non-governmental organisation which is active in the area of drought prevention and watershed management in the Maharashtra, India.

In October 2014, he was appointed as the UNICEF Goodwill Ambassador for South Asia.

== Personal life ==
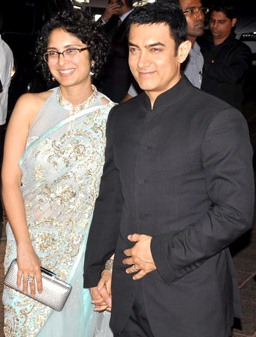
Khan with his then wife Kiran Rao at an event in 2012

Aamir Khan married Reena Dutta, who had a small part in Qayamat Se Qayamat Tak, on 18 April 1986. They have two children: a son named Junaid and a daughter, Ira. Dutta was involved briefly in his career when she worked as a producer for Lagaan. In December 2002, he filed for divorce and Dutta took custody of both children.

On 28 December 2005, he married Kiran Rao, who had been an assistant director to Gowariker on the set of Lagaan. On 5 December 2011, they announced the birth of their son, Azad Rao Khan, through a surrogate mother. In July 2021, the couple announced their separation and stated they would raise their son Azad together.

His former wife Rao is a Hindu. In March 2015, he stated that he quit non-vegetarian food and adopted a vegan lifestyle after being inspired by her.

Before pursuing a full-time acting career, Aamir Khan was an avid tennis player. He played professionally in state level championships in the 1980s and became a state level tennis champion prior to entering a full-time acting career. In 2014, he participated in an exhibition match for the International Premier Tennis League, playing doubles with grand slam winners Roger Federer and Novak Djokovic, as well as Sania Mirza.

His children have also ventured into the entertainment industry. In September 2019, Ira announced on social media that she would be directing a theatrical production, her first, a version of Euripides' Medea. Veteran actress Sarika, ex-wife of Kamal Haasan, and her daughter Akshara Haasan produced the play, and Khan's sister Farhat Dutta had painted a poster for its promotion. His elder son Junaid made his acting debut in the Hindi film Maharaj.

In March 2025, Khan publicly introduced Gauri Spratt as his girlfriend at his 60th birthday party, confirming their 18-month relationship. He married her on 5 July 2026 in a private ceremony.

== Political controversies ==
=== Gujarat (2006) ===
In 2006, Aamir Khan lent his support to the Narmada Bachao Andolan movement, led by activist Medha Patkar, in their actions against raising the height of the Sardar Sarovar Dam. While promoting his film Fanaa in Gujarat, he made some comments regarding the Bharatiya Janata Party (BJP) Gujarat chief minister Narendra Modi's handling of the Narmada Dam and the necessity to rehabilitate the displaced villagers. These comments were met with outrage from the BJP, with the government of Gujarat demanding an apology from Khan. He refused to apologise, saying "I am saying exactly what the Supreme Court has said. I only asked for rehabilitation of poor farmers. I never spoke against the construction of the dam. I will not apologise for my comments on the issue." An unofficial ban of Fanaa was put in place for the entire state of Gujarat. Protests occurred against the film and Khan, which included burning posters of him. As a result, several multiplex owners stated that they could not provide security to customers, and all theatre owners in Gujarat refused to screen the film.

=== Comments on intolerance (2013–2016) ===
"I think in the last maybe six to eight months, there is a growing sense of despondency. When I chat with Kiran at home, she says, 'Should we move out of India?' That's a disastrous and big statement for Kiran to make. She fears for her child. She fears what the atmosphere around us will be. She feels scared to open the newspapers every day."

— Khan on his wife Kiran Rao's views.

In November 2015, Aamir Khan expressed the feelings that he and Rao had about rising intolerance in India at an event in New Delhi hosted by The Indian Express newspaper in response to political events in India that included violent attacks against Muslims and intellectuals, and the absence of swift or strong condemnation from the country's ruling Bharatiya Janata Party (BJP) Modi government. He remarked that Rao, fearing for her family, suggested to "move out of India".

BJP responded with online campaigns through its social media cell to intimidate Khan. The ensuing political controversy was referred to as the "intolerance row" in the Indian media, and started a debate on social media. Khan faced intense backlash for his comments, with certain sections of society branding him "anti-national", while others voiced their agreement about his concerns and supported him.

Much of the backlash against him, an Indian Muslim with a Hindu wife, came from Hindu nationalist groups. The far-right political party Shiv Sena sharply criticised Khan's statement, labelling it "the language of treachery", and the BJP condemned the incident as a "Moral Offence". In the wake of the controversy, burning of posters took place in Ludhiana by Shiv Sena. Punjab's Shiv Sena chief Rajeev Tandon also made a violent threat, offering a ₹1 lakh (US$1,558.8) reward to anyone who slaps Khan. As a result, the Khans were given additional police protection. Khan responded to the backlash and threats by stating, "it saddens me to say you are only proving my point".

In response to the backlash, he received support from a number of celebrities and public figures, including Indian National Congress leader Rahul Gandhi, Hrithik Roshan, Shah Rukh Khan, Mamata Banerjee, Rajkumar Hirani, Kabir Khan, Farah Khan, A. R. Rahman, and Priyanka Chopra. On the other hand, some criticised Khan's remark about intolerance, including Shatrughan Sinha, Anupam Kher, Raveena Tandon, and Vivek Oberoi.

He later stated that he was not leaving the country. A lawsuit was filed against Khan and Rao at Jaunpur in ACJM II court. Khan was dropped as brand ambassador of the government's official Incredible India tourism campaign. A company that Khan was endorsing, Snapdeal, faced backlash from Khan's critics for being associated with him, before the company distanced themselves from his comments.

Aamir Khan later clarified his comments in January 2016, saying that he never said India was intolerant or that he thought about leaving the country, saying he was "born in India and will die in India". He said that his comments were taken out of context and the media was responsible for it to some extent. Despite this, he continued to face backlash later in the year, with calls for protests and boycotts against Dangal. In October 2016, the Vishva Hindu Parishad called for protests against the film. Following its release in December 2016, #BoycottDangal trended on Twitter, and BJP general secretary Kailash Vijayvargiya called for protests against the film. Despite calls to boycott the film, Dangal turned out to be a massive hit, grossing more than ₹500 crore (US$74.41 million) in India.

== Awards and honours ==
Khan won 9 Filmfare Awards, out of 32 nominations, (Note: Awards in certain categories come without a prior nomination.) including the Best Actor award for Raja Hindustani (1996), Lagaan (2001), and Dangal (2016); the Best Actor (Critics) award for Rang De Basanti (2006); the Best Film award for Lagaan, Taare Zameen Par (2007), and Dangal; and the Best Director award for Taare Zameen Par. He won four National Film Awards: as an actor in Qayamat Se Qayamat Tak (1988) and Raakh (1989), as producer of Lagaan and Madness in the Desert (2004), and as director and producer of Taare Zameen Par.

Lagaan earned an Oscar nomination for Best Foreign Language Film at the 74th Academy Awards in 2002. He commented on losing at the Oscars: "Certainly we were disappointed. But the thing that really kept us in our spirits was that the entire country was behind us". Taare Zameen Par was also India's submission to the Oscars, but was not nominated. Another Khan production, Peepli Live (2010), was India's submission to the Oscars, while Dhobi Ghat (2011) was longlisted for the BAFTA Award for Best Film Not in the English Language; neither were nominated. In 2017, Dangal won him the inaugural Best Asian Film award at Australia's 7th AACTA Awards, as well as Movie of the Year and Top Foreign Actor from China's Douban Film Awards, and it was an award nominee for the 68th Berlin International Film Festival.

Khan has received honorary accolades, including the India's Padma Shri in 2003 and Padma Bhushan in 2010, and an Honorary Doctorate by the Maulana Azad National Urdu University for his contributions to the Indian cinema and entertainment industry. In 2011, he accepted an invitation from the Berlin Film Festival to be on the jury, after having turned it down three times since 2008. In 2012, he appeared on the Time 100 list of most influential people in the world. In 2017, the Academy of Motion Picture Arts and Sciences invited Khan to be a member, and he received an award for "National Treasure of India" from China.

Khan is known for refusing to attend, or accept awards from, Indian film ceremonies. This has led to controversy, notably at the 2017 National Film Awards, where he was snubbed from Best Actor for Dangal. Committee member Priyadarshan explained that they did not want to award him because of his refusal to attend. Despite avoiding Indian ceremonies, he made an exception for the 2002 Academy Awards, so Lagaan could reach a wider audience, but did not care much about the award.

In December 2024, Khan was honoured at the opening night of Saudi Arabia's Red Sea Film Festival.

== See also ==
- Khans of Bollywood – Bollywood actors with the surname Khan

== Bibliography ==
- Khubchandani, Lata (2002). Aamir Khan: Actor With a Difference. New Delhi: Rupa & Co. ISBN 978-81-291-0046-7.
- Daniels, Christina (2011). I'll Do it My Way: The Incredible Journey of Aamir Khan. New Delhi: Om Books International. ISBN 978-93-80069-22-7.
- Chandra, Pradeep (2014). Aamir Khan: Actor, Activist, Achiever. New Delhi: Niyogi Books. ISBN 978-93-83098-29-3.
