= Let's All Go to the Lobby =

1957 American short film

- Four anthropomorphic snack food items are featured in the film.
- Directed by: Dave Fleischer
- Produced by: Filmack
- Release date: 1957
- Running time: 60 seconds
- Language: English

Let's All Go to the Lobby (officially known as Technicolor Refreshment Trailer No. 1) is an American animated musical advertisement that was produced in the mid-1950s for Filmack Studios. It was played in theaters before the beginning of the main film or before intermission, and features animated food items urging the audience to buy snacks sold in the theater lobby. It was directed by Dave Fleischer with lyrics by Jack Tillar.

Filmack has continued selling copies of Let's All Go to the Lobby in the decades since its production and estimates that 80% of independent domestic theaters have screened the advertisement. The film historian Daniel Eagan wrote that it is likely the most-viewed snipe and that it was ubiquitous to the American theater-going experience of the 1960s. The well-known scene of the animated concessions has frequently been parodied in popular culture. In 2000, Let's All Go to the Lobby was selected for preservation in the US National Film Registry by the Library of Congress as being "culturally, historically, or aesthetically significant".

== Content ==
An incomplete video of the film, showing 4 of the 6 shots.

Let's All Go to the Lobby consists of six shots. The most recognizable of these depicts four animated food items (from left to right: a candy bar, (Note: The left-most refreshment is a rectangular wrapped package described by the National Film Preservation Board and Eagan as chewing gum, and by the Chicago Tribune as a candy bar.) popcorn, candy, and a soft drink) singing and walking leftwards. In the foreground before these characters are silhouettes of audience members, creating an illusion of depth, a standard technique of the medium. In a later shot, a group of four consumers are depicted enjoying their purchased food items.

The eponymous song of the film is set to the same tune as "We Won't Be Home Until Morning", "The Bear Went Over the Mountain", "For He's a Jolly Good Fellow", and "Marlbrough s'en va-t-en guerre" (c. 1709). While the origins of the melody are lost, it was already well-enough known in the early 19th century to be used for a passage in Wellington's Victory (1813) by Ludwig van Beethoven.

The film historian Daniel Eagan wrote that "[w]ith its simple, repetitive lyrics and streamlined animation, Let's All Go to the Lobby has a hypnotic pull that is as compelling today as it was fifty years ago." He also wrote that by choosing not to simply photograph the offered items, the creators of the advertisement avoided using brand names of the products for sale.

== Background and production ==
The Chicago-based Filmack Studios, originally known as Filmack Trailer Company, was founded in 1919 by Irving Mack. The company specialized in the production of snipes, an industry term for filmed newsreels, promotional material, merchants, advertisements, previews of coming attractions, courtesy requests for the audience, and notices concerning the concession stand of the movie theater. In 1951, the sales of concession stands represented approximately 20% of movie theaters' revenue. (Note: Concession stands had a growing importance for American movie theatres, representing 20% of revenue in 1951 and 80% in 1989.) Filmack commissioned a series of Technicolor trailers aimed at informing audiences about a theater's newly installed concession stand. Let's All Go to the Lobby was one of these films.

The lyrics of the song featured in Let's All Go to the Lobby were written by Jack Tillar. Dave Fleischer is identified as the creator of the advertisement in a catalog of Filmack's releases, which reported that "trailers were produced exclusively for Filmack by Dave Fleischer". Specific details of Fleischer's involvement are lacking, and the original production records are considered lost; other production crew are unknown. Production may have started by 1953, but Robbie Mack (a later owner of Filmack) estimates that it was completed c. 1955. The release date is typically estimated to be 1957.

== Legacy ==
Filmack has continued selling copies of Let's All Go to the Lobby in the decades since its production. The company estimates that 80% of independent theaters in the United States have screened the film, and Eagan has said that it is likely the most-viewed snipe. In 2000, Let's All Go to the Lobby was selected for preservation in the National Film Registry by the US Library of Congress as being "culturally, historically, or aesthetically significant". During the 2000s, Filmack sold 50–100 copies of the snipe per year.

The animation historian Thad Komorowski has stated that while the animation was "downright primitive" by the standards of the 1950s, it "outlast[ed] any other trailer of its kind". John Owens of the Chicago Tribune called it "one of the most iconic movies in American cinema history". Eagan, who wrote a comprehensive guide to National Film Registry titles, called it "a cultural touchstone" and an inherent part of the American theater experience of the 1950s and 1960s.

=== In popular culture ===
Let's All Go to the Lobby's scene of singing concessions has been frequently parodied in advertisements of the 2000s. These include a 2006 spot for Chipotle Mexican Grill where a burrito attempts to join the characters, a 2011 spot for the Tribeca Film Festival where the characters are mobsters voiced by the cast of The Sopranos, and a 2013 GEICO commercial where the characters are chided for speaking on their cell phones. It has also been spoofed in popular entertainment including the Late Show with David Letterman, The Simpsons, and The Lego Movie 2: The Second Part, and appears in fictional depictions of theaters. Lionsgate produced a quarantine-themed version of the snipe to accompany special presentations of films streamed online during the COVID-19 pandemic.
