= Kiran Rao =

Indian film director, screenwriter and film producer (born 1973)

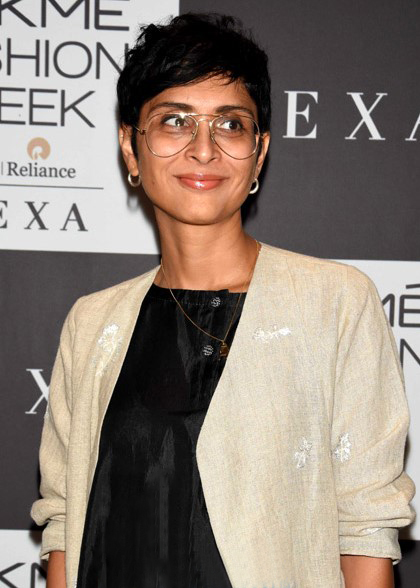
- Rao at the Lakme Fashion Week in 2017
- Born: 7 November 1973 (age 52); Bangalore, Karnataka, India
- Education: Sophia Women College; Jamia Millia Islamia
- Occupations: Filmmaker; screenwriter
- Years active: 2004–present
- Organization(s): Paani Foundation; Kindling Pictures
- Spouse: Aamir Khan (m. 2005; div. 2021)
- Children: 1
- Relatives: Aditi Rao Hydari (cousin)

Kiran Rao (born 7 November 1973) is an Indian film director, film producer and screenwriter who works in Hindi cinema. She has directed the critically acclaimed films Dhobi Ghat (2011) and Laapataa Ladies (2024), both produced under Aamir Khan Productions. In 2016, Rao co-founded Paani Foundation, a non-profit organisation, and Kindling Pictures, a film production company in 2021.

== Early life ==
Kiran Rao was born on 7 November 1973 in Bengaluru, daughter of retired army officer C R Rao and Uma Rao. She grew up in Calcutta, where she attended Loreto House & La Martinière for Girls. In 1992, her parents decided to leave Calcutta for Bangalore so she moved to Mumbai for undergraduate studies. She graduated with an economics major from the Sophia College for Women in 1995. She attended the Social Communications Media course at the Sophia Polytechnic for two months, but then quit and left for Delhi. She got her master's degree at AJK Mass Communication Research Centre at Jamia Millia Islamia, New Delhi.

Actress Aditi Rao Hydari is Rao's first cousin. Rao's paternal and Hydari's maternal grandfather, J. Rameshwar Rao, was the Raja of Wanaparthy, a large estate under the Nizam of Hyderabad.

== Career ==
Rao started her career as the assistant director in the epic film Lagaan directed by Ashutosh Gowariker, whom she also assisted later on Swades: We, the People. Lagaan was nominated for 74th Academy Awards in the foreign language film category. Aamir Khan produced and starred in the same film. Before Lagaan, she has also done minute role of supporting actress in Dil Chahta Hai. She also worked as second assistant director with Academy Award-nominated director Mira Nair on the indie hit Monsoon Wedding.

She scripted and directed the film Dhobi Ghat, which was released in January 2011 under Aamir Khan Productions. She has started writing her next film which had roots in Kolkata.

Kiran Rao was made the chairperson of the Mumbai Film Festival (MAMI) in 2015. She also sang a Marathi song 'Toofan Aalaya', the Satyamev Jayate Water Cup Anthem.

In 2024, her film Laapataa Ladies was selected as the Indian entry for the Best International Feature Film for the 97th Academy Awards.

== Personal life ==
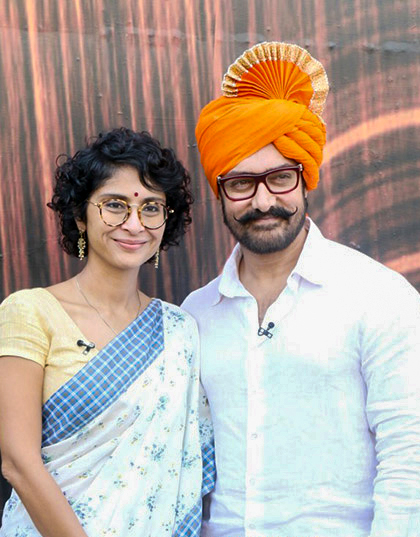
Rao and Aamir Khan promoting Paani Foundation in 2017

Rao married actor Aamir Khan in December 2005, after Khan divorced his former wife Reena Dutta in 2002. They met on the sets of Lagaan. Rao was one of the film's assistant directors. They were living in Bandra, a Mumbai suburb. The couple have a son, Azad Rao Khan, born in December 2011, through a surrogate mother, and has been named after the activist and writer Abul Kalam Azad.

Rao has been a vegan, and she had influenced her then-husband, Aamir Khan, to turn vegan as well. After discussing the issue, both of them decided to turn vegan.

On 3 July 2021, Kiran Rao and Aamir Khan announced their decision to divorce after 15 years of marriage via a joint statement where they thanked their family and friends for their continuous support in this matter. They stated that they would continue to raise their son as co-parents. Rao has maintained a close friendship with Khan and continues to work under his production banner.

== Filmography ==
=== Director ===
Year	Title	Notes
2011	Dhobi Ghat	
2024	Laapataa Ladies	
2026	Lust Stories 3	

=== Producer ===
Year	Title	Notes
2008	Jaane Tu... Ya Jaane Na	associate producer
2010	Peepli Live	
2011	Dhobi Ghat	
2011	Delhi Belly	
2012	Talaash	
2016	Dangal	
2017	Secret Superstar	
2019	Rubaru Roshni	documentary film
2022	Laal Singh Chaddha	
2025	Sitaare Zameen Par	
2026	Batwara 1947	

=== Presenter ===
Year	Title
2013	Ship of Theseus

=== Singer ===
Year	Title
2017	Toofan Aalaya (Satyamev Jayate Water Cup anthem)
