= List of awards and nominations received by Aamir Khan =

Aamir Khan awards and nominations
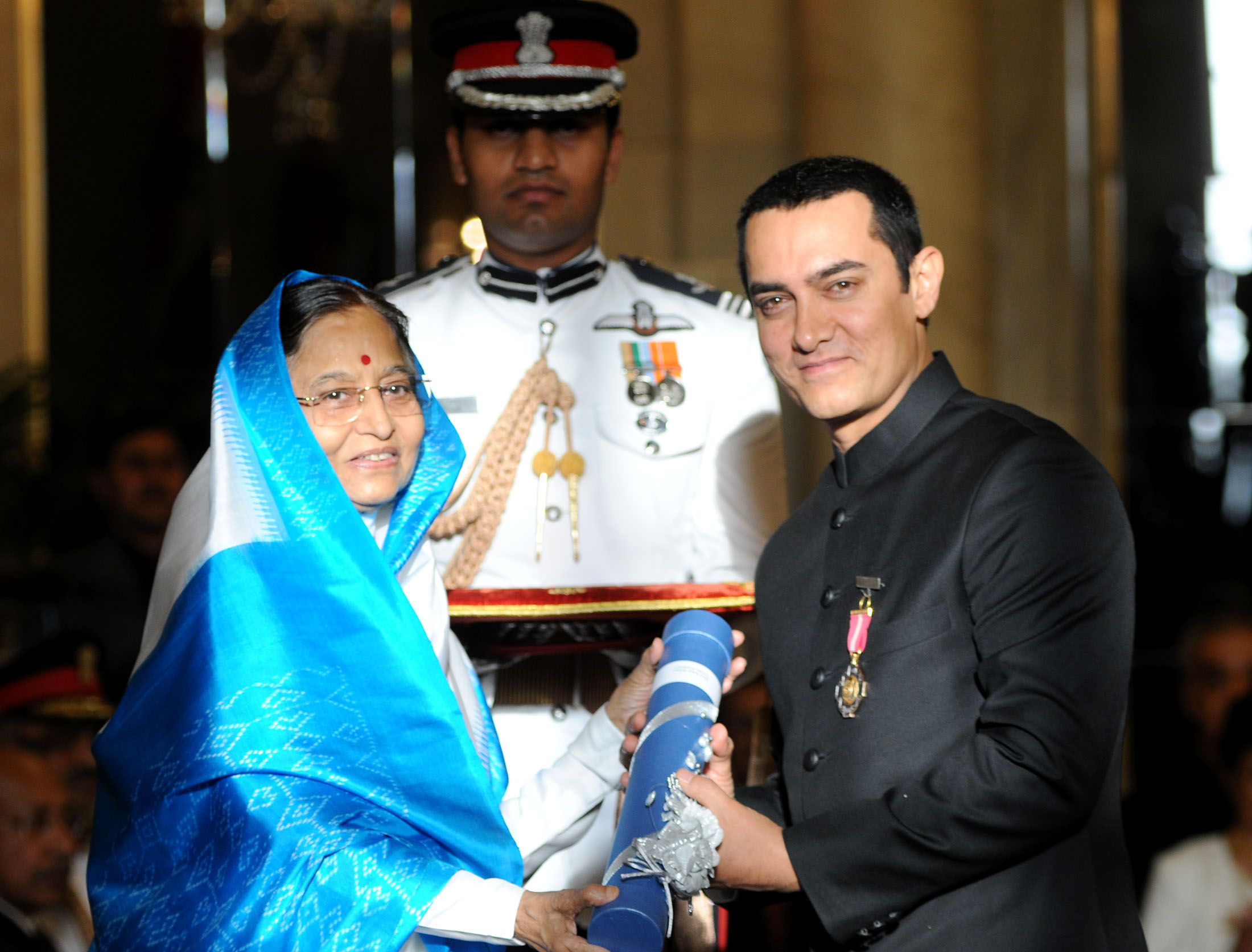
- Khan receiving the Padma Bhushan Award
Awards and nominations (Note: Awards in certain categories do not have prior nominations and only winners are announced by the jury. For simplification and to avoid errors, each award in this list has been presumed to have had a prior nomination.)
| Award | Wins | Nomination |
| AACTA Awards | 1 | 1 |
| Bergen International Film Festival | 1 | 1 |
| Big Star Entertainment Awards | 1 | 1 |
| Bollywood Movie Awards | 2 | 2 |
| Bengal Film Journalists' Association Awards | 2 | 0 |
| Douban Film Awards | 3 | 5 |
| ETC Bollywood Business Awards | 3 | 3 |
| European Film Awards | 0 | 1 |
| Filmfare Awards | 9 | 32 |
| Gollapudi Srinivas Award | 1 | 1 |
| IIFA Awards | 2 | 10 |
| Leeds International Film Festival | 1 | 1 |
| Locarno International Film Festival | 1 | 1 |
| NatFilm Festival | 1 | 1 |
| National Film Awards | 4 | 4 |
| Portland International Film Festival | 1 | 1 |
| Producers Guild Film Awards | 2 | 5 |
| Screen Awards | 6 | 11 |
| Telstra People's Choice Award | 1 | 1 |
| V. Shantaram | 2 | 2 |
| Zee Cine Awards | 6 | 12 |
- Totals
| Wins | 65 |
| Nominations | 113 |

This is a list of the awards and nominations received by the Indian actor, producer and director Aamir Khan. He has won 9 Filmfare Awards, out of 32 nominations, including 3 Best Actor awards for Raja Hindustani (1996), Lagaan (2001), and Dangal (2016), the Best Actor (Critics) award for Rang De Basanti (2006), the Best Film award for Lagaan, Taare Zameen Par (2007), and Dangal, and the Best Director award for Taare Zameen Par. He has also won four National Film Awards, as an actor in Qayamat Se Qayamat Tak and Raakh, both in 1988 and as a producer of Lagaan (2001), Madness in the Desert (2003) and as the director-producer of Taare Zameen Par (2007).

Overseas, Lagaan earned an Academy Award nomination for Best Foreign Language Film, and won various awards at international film festivals. This made it one of only three Indian films to receive an Oscar nomination, along with Mehboob Khan's Mother India (1957) and Mira Nair's Salaam Bombay! (1988). This also makes Aamir Khan one of the few Indian filmmakers to ever receive an Oscar nomination. Two more of his films were India's submissions to the Oscars, Taare Zameen Par and Peepli Live (2010), while Dhobi Ghat (2011) was longlisted for the BAFTA Award for Best Film Not in the English Language, though neither were nominated. In 2017, Dangal won him the inaugural Best Asian Film award at Australia's 7th AACTA Awards, as well as Movie of the Year and Top Foreign Actor from China's Douban Film Awards, and it is an award nominee for the 68th Berlin International Film Festival.

In addition, Khan has received honorary accolades, including the Government of India's Padma Shri in 2003 and Padma Bhushan in 2010, and an honorary doctorate by the Maulana Azad National Urdu University (MANUU) for his distinguished contributions to the Indian cinema and entertainment industry. In 2011, he accepted an invitation from the Berlin Film Festival to be a member of the jury, after having previously turned down their offer three times since 2008. In 2017, the Academy of Motion Picture Arts and Sciences invited Khan for membership, and he received an award for "National Treasure of India" from the Government of China.

Despite having won numerous awards and honours, Aamir Khan is known for refusing to attend, or accept awards from, Indian film award ceremonies. This has occasionally led to controversy, notably at the 2017 National Film Awards when the award committee responded by refusing to honour Khan with the Best Actor award for his performance in Dangal.

== Civilian and honorary awards ==
- 2003 – Padma Shri, the fourth highest civilian award in the Republic of India.
- 2010 – Padma Bhushan, the third highest civilian award in the Republic of India.
- 2009 – "Raj Kapoor Smriti Vishesh Gaurav Puraskar", an award received from the Government of Maharashtra in May 2009 for outstanding contribution to Indian cinema.
- 2013 – Honorary Doctorate by Maulana Azad National Urdu University (MANUU) for his distinguished contribution to the Indian cinema and entertainment industry.
- 2017 – "National Treasure of India", an award received from the Government of China in April 2017.

== Indian film awards ==
=== Filmfare Awards ===
The Filmfare Awards are presented annually by The Times Group to honour both artistic and technical excellence of professionals in the Hindi language film industry of India. The Filmfare ceremony is one of the oldest film events in India, established in 1954. The Filmfare Awards have been often referred to as the Hindi film industry's equivalent to the Academy Awards.

| Year | Film | Category | Result |
|---|---|---|---|
| 1989 | Qayamat Se Qayamat Tak | Best Male Debut | Won |
| 1989 | Qayamat Se Qayamat Tak | Best Actor | Nominated |
| 1990 | Raakh | Best Actor | Nominated |
| 1991 | Dil | Best Actor | Nominated |
| 1992 | Dil Hai Ke Manta Nahin | Best Actor | Nominated |
| 1993 | Jo Jeeta Wohi Sikandar | Best Actor | Nominated |
| 1994 | Hum Hain Rahi Pyar Ke | Best Actor | Nominated |
| 1995 | Andaz Apna Apna | Best Actor | Nominated |
| 1996 | Rangeela | Best Actor | Nominated |
| 1997 | Raja Hindustani | Best Actor | Won |
| 1999 | Ghulam | Best Male Playback Singer | Nominated (Note: For the song "Aati Kya Khandala") |
| 1999 | Ghulam | Best Actor | Nominated |
| 2000 | Sarfarosh | Best Actor | Nominated |
| 2002 | Lagaan | Best Film | Won |
| 2002 | Lagaan | Best Actor | Won |
| 2002 | Dil Chahta Hai | Best Actor | Nominated |
| 2006 | Mangal Pandey: The Rising | Best Actor | Nominated |
| 2007 | Rang De Basanti | Best Actor | Nominated |
| 2007 | Rang De Basanti | Best Actor (Critics) | Won |
| 2008 | Taare Zameen Par | Best Film | Won |
| 2008 | Taare Zameen Par | Best Director | Won |
| 2008 | Taare Zameen Par | Best Supporting Actor | Nominated |
| 2009 | Jaane Tu Ya Jaane Na | Best Film | Nominated |
| 2009 | Ghajini | Best Actor | Nominated |
| 2010 | 3 Idiots | Best Actor | Nominated |
| 2011 | Peepli Live | Best Film | Nominated |
| 2012 | Delhi Belly | Best Film | Nominated |
| 2015 | PK | Best Actor | Nominated |
| 2017 | Dangal | Best Actor | Won |
| 2017 | Dangal | Best Film | Won |
| 2018 | Secret Superstar | Best Film | Nominated |
| 2018 | Secret Superstar | Best Supporting Actor | Nominated |

=== National Film Awards ===
The National Film Awards is one of the most prominent film award ceremonies in India. Established in 1954, it is administered by the International Film Festival of India and the Indian government's Directorate of Film Festivals. The awards are presented by the President of India.

| Year | Category | Film | Ref. | Result |
|---|---|---|---|---|
| 1988 | Special Mention | Qayamat Se Qayamat Tak | | |
| 2001 | Best Popular Film Providing Wholesome Entertainment | Lagaan | | |
| 2003 | Best Exploration/Adventure Film | Madness in the Desert | | |
| 2007 | Best Film on Family Welfare | Taare Zameen Par | | |

=== IIFA Awards ===
| Year | Category | Film | Result |
|---|---|---|---|
| 2000 | Best Actor | Sarfarosh | Nominated |
| 2002 | Best Film | Lagaan | Won |
| 2002 | Best Actor | Lagaan | Won |
| 2002 | Best Actor | Dil Chahta Hai | Nominated |
| 2007 | Best Actor | Rang De Basanti | Nominated |
| 2009 | Star of the Decade | Himself | Nominated |
| 2009 | Movie of the Decade | Lagaan | Won |
| 2009 | Best Actor | Ghajini | Nominated |
| 2010 | Best Actor | 3 Idiots | Nominated |
| 2013 | Best Film | Talaash | Nominated |
| 2013 | Best Actor | Talaash | Nominated |
| 2015 | Best Actor | PK | Nominated |

=== Producers Guild Film Awards ===
| Year | Category | Film | Result | Ref. |
|---|---|---|---|---|
| 2009 | Best Film | Taare Zameen Par | Won | |
| 2009 | Best Film | Jaane Tu... Ya Jaane Na | Nominated | |
| 2009 | Best Director | Taare Zameen Par | Won | |
| 2010 | Best Actor | Ghajini | Nominated | |
| 2015 | Best Actor | PK | Nominated | |

=== Screen Awards ===
Won

- Best Actor — Raja Hindustani
- Best Film — Lagaan
- Best Director — Taare Zameen Par
- Best Supporting Actor — Taare Zameen Par
- Best Film — Dangal
- Star Plus Nayi Soch Award — Dangal

Nominated

- 2008 – Best Film — Taare Zameen Par
- 2010 – Best Actor — 3 Idiots
- 2014 – Best Actor — Dhoom 3
- 2014 – Best Actor (Popular) — Dhoom 3
- 2015 – Best Actor — PK

=== Gollapudi Srinivas Award ===
| Year | Category | Film | Result | Ref. |
|---|---|---|---|---|
| 2008 | Best Debut Director | Taare Zameen Par | Won | |

=== Zee Cine Awards ===
| Year | Category | Film | Result | Ref. |
|---|---|---|---|---|
| 1998 | Best Actor | Ishq | Nominated | |
| 1999 | Best Actor | Ghulam | Nominated | |
| 2000 | Best Actor | Sarfarosh | Won | |
| 2002 | Best Actor | Lagaan | Won | |
| 2002 | Best Film | Lagaan | Won | |
| 2002 | Best Actor | Dil Chahta Hai | Nominated | |
| 2007 | Best Actor | Rang De Basanti | Nominated | |
| 2008 | Best Director | Taare Zameen Par | Won | |
| 2008 | Most Promising Director | Taare Zameen Par | Won | |
| 2014 | Best Actor | Dhoom 3 | Nominated | |
| 2017 | Best Actor | Dangal | Nominated | |
| 2017 | Best Film | Dangal | Won | |

=== Bengal Film Journalists' Association Awards ===
| Year | Category | Film | Result | Ref. |
|---|---|---|---|---|
| 1996 | Best Actor (Hindi) | Rangeela & Akele Hum Akele Tum | Won | |
| 2002 | Best Actor (Hindi) | Lagaan | Won | |

=== Bollywood Movie Awards ===
| Year | Category | Film | Result | Ref. |
|---|---|---|---|---|
| 2002 | Best Actor | Lagaan | Won | |
| 2002 | Best Actor (Critics) | Dil Chahta Hai | Won | |

=== BIG Star Entertainment Awards ===
Winner

- 2010 – BIG Star – Film Actor of Decade (Male)

== International Film Awards ==
=== AACTA Awards ===
| Year | Category | Film | Result | Ref. |
|---|---|---|---|---|
| 2017 | Best Asian Film | Dangal | Won | |

=== Douban Film Awards ===
| Year | Category | Film | Result | Ref. |
|---|---|---|---|---|
| 2017 | Movie of the Year | Dangal | Won | |
| 2017 | Top Foreign Actor | Dangal | Won | |
| 2017 | Most Talked-About Film | Dangal | Nominated | |
| 2017 | Top Movie Soundtrack | Dangal | Nominated | |
| 2017 | Movie of the Month (May) | Dangal | Won | |

=== European Film Awards ===
| Date of ceremony | Ceremony | Category | Film | Result | Ref. |
|---|---|---|---|---|---|
| 1 December 2001 | European Film Awards | Best Non-European Film | Lagaan | Nominated | |

=== Film festivals ===
| Date of ceremony | Festival | Category | Film | Result | Ref. |
|---|---|---|---|---|---|
| 2001 | Bergen International Film Festival | Jury's Award | Lagaan | Won | |
| 16 October 2001 | Leeds International Film Festival | Audience Award | Lagaan | Won | |
| 12 August 2001 | Locarno International Film Festival | Audience Award | Lagaan | Won | |
| 14 April 2002 | NatFilm Festival | Audience Award | Lagaan | Won | |
| 23 February 2002 | Portland International Film Festival | Audience Award for Best Film | Lagaan | Won | |
| 12 August 2017 | Indian Film Festival of Melbourne | People's Choice Award | Dangal | Won | |
| February 2018 | Berlin International Film Festival | Asian Brilliant Stars | Dangal | Nominated | |
| November 2026 | Singapore International Film Festival | Screen Icon Award | 25th-anniversary Special Presentation screening of Lagaan | Won | |

== Other awards ==
Winner

- 2008 – V. Shantaram Awards: Best Film Gold Award for Taare Zameen Par.
- 2008 – V. Shantaram Awards: Best Director Silver Award for Taare Zameen Par.
- 2010 – Creative Entrepreneur of the Year Award at NDTV Profit Business Leadership Awards.
- 2010 – Cinematic Icon Award by GQ India.
- 2013 – Inaugural America Abroad Media Award for Satyamev Jayate.
- 2014 – ETC Bollywood Business Award: Highest Grossing Actor (male) Award for Dhoom 3.
- 2017 – Creative Maverick Award by GQ India.

== Honours and recognitions ==
- In March 2001, he was ranked as the 3rd Most Powerful Indian Film Star by Forbes.
- In December 2001, he was named "Man of the Year" by Bombay Times.
- In 2002, he was a member of the jury of the Locarno film festival.
- In April 2008, he received a "Special Award" from Master Dinanath Mangeshkar Smruti Pratisthan for his services to Indian cinema.
- In January 2009, he received "Indian of The Year in Cinema" Award by NDTV.
- In January 2009, he received the "Indian of the Year in Entertainment" Award from CNN-IBN.
- In August 2012, he featured on the cover page of the Time.
- In April 2013, he was among Time's 100 Most Influential People in the World List.
- In April 2017, he received a "Special Award" from Master Dinanath Mangeshkar Smruti Pratisthan for the recognition for the success of his film Dangal.
- In June 2017, he was included in Reputation Poll's inaugural "100 Most Reputable People on Earth" list.
- In June 2017, the Academy of Motion Picture Arts and Sciences invited Khan for membership.

== See also ==
- List of accolades received by Lagaan
- List of accolades received by Taare Zameen Par
- List of accolades received by 3 Idiots
