= Paani Foundation =

Non-profit organization

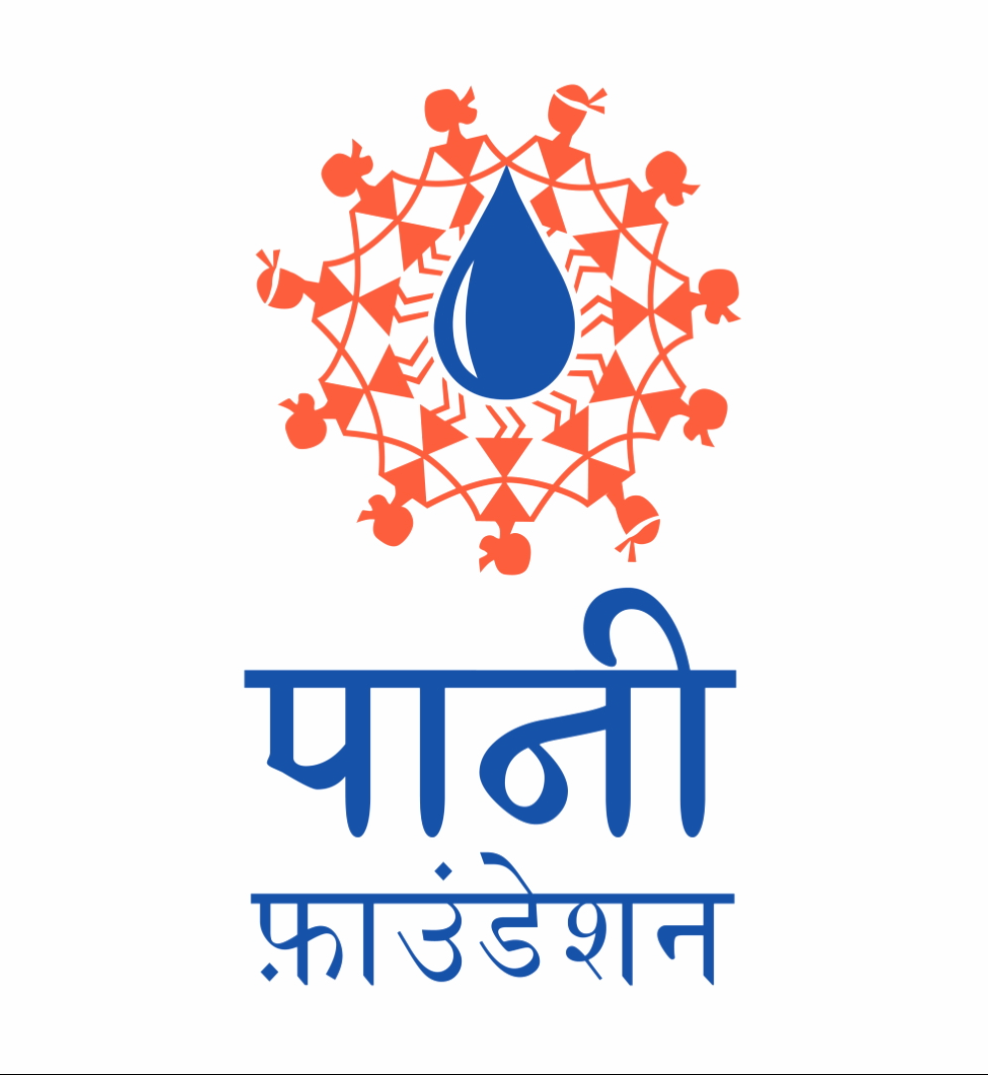
- Founded: 2016
- Founders: Aamir Khan; Kiran Rao
- Purpose: Drought and the water-crisis
- Region served: India
- Website: www.paanifoundation.in

Paani Foundation is a non-profit, non-governmental organization which is active in the area of drought prevention and watershed management in the state of Maharashtra, India. The organization was founded by Indian actor Aamir Khan, his ex-wives Kiran Rao and Reena Dutta, and film and television director Satyajit Bhatkal. Bhatkal is the CEO of the foundation.

The primary aim of Paani Foundation is to spread knowledge of watershed management and groundwater replenishment. Paani Foundation has been organizing the Satyamev Jayate Water Cup competition since 2016, where villages compete with each other to implement watershed management and water conservation methods in the summer months leading up to the monsoon season. Paani foundation carries steps to overcome the ill effects of droughts.

== Background ==
The state of Maharashtra in India has a history of recurring droughts and acute water shortage throughout the last several decades (e.g. in 2013). There are both natural and man-made reasons for this situation. One-third of the state falls under the semi-arid climatic zone. Rainfall patterns have been increasingly erratic in recent years due to effects of climate change. Irrigation in the state is 16% of area under cultivation, much lower than the 42% national average. This has led to overuse of bore wells (tube wells), leading to a steep fall in groundwater levels. Water-intensive cash crops such as sugarcane are also cultivated in semi-arid regions, exacerbating the problem.

In 2015, the state government officially declared that 60% of its villages were facing a "drought-like condition". This means that they reported a crop yield which was less than 50% of the standard yield in the area. In absolute figures, 23,811 of the state's 39,453 villages come in this category. This will result in a drastic fall in the state's agricultural output for the year, officials said.

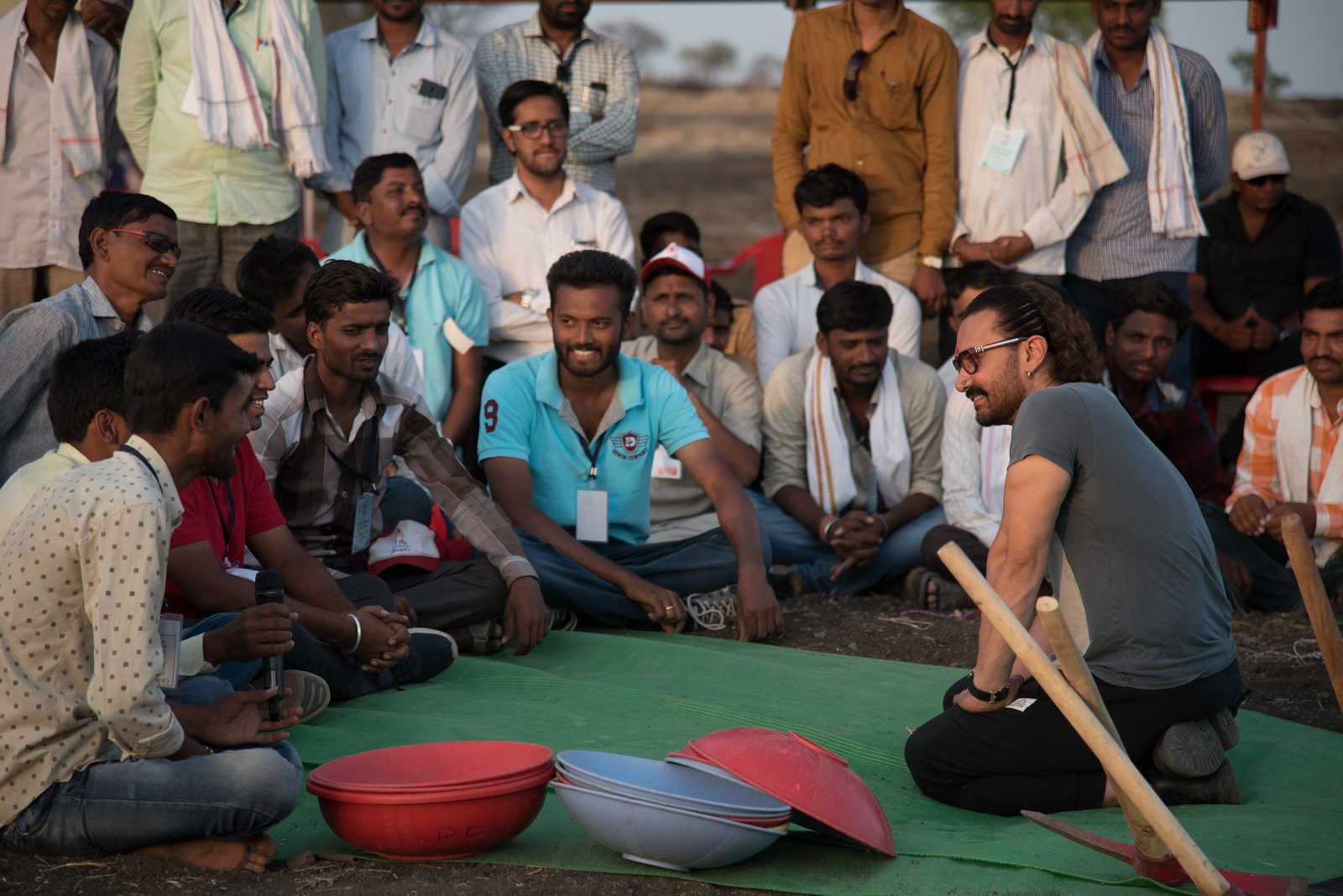
Aamir Khan interacts with residents of participating villages of the Satyamev Jayate Water Cup 2018.

== History ==
Aamir Khan's television series Satyamev Jayate, which discussed wide-ranging social issues plaguing India, had originally addressed the issue of water scarcity and the shortcomings of water management in India in the 12th episode of the first season, which was broadcast on 22 July 2012. After the series ended its run in November 2014, Khan and the show's director Satyajit Bhatkal decided to take up a cause that they could stay with for several years and show tangible results. They settled upon the tackling the problem of chronic water shortage in rural Maharashtra. Khan and Bhatkal, along with Khan's ex-wife Kiran Rao and others from the TV series core team spent more than a year understanding the issue and researching possible solutions. In 2016, they set up Paani Foundation.

In April–May 2016, India watched in horror as poignant images of drought emerged from its richest state, Maharashtra. A train commissioned by the railways had to be arranged to supply water to Latur city. Yet, in the same year, there was a citizens’ response to drought when the Paani Foundation was formed with a mission to make Maharashtra ‘drought-free’.

== Satyamev Jayate Water Cup ==
=== Introduction ===
Satyamev Jayate Water Cup, billed as a "people's movement against drought", is the primary event organized by Paani Foundation every year starting late March-early April up to late May-early June. It is a competition among participating the villages to complete the maximum possible amount of work for watershed development and water conservation within their habitats before the monsoon season begins. The competition is intended to be a platform to get people to volunteer to carry out watershed development works throughout the periphery of their villages.

The foundation selects drought-hit tehsils, trains a group of residents in watershed development and organizes a 45-day ‘water cup’ contest among villages to see who creates the maximum possible rainwater storage capacity, thereby gaining water conservation.

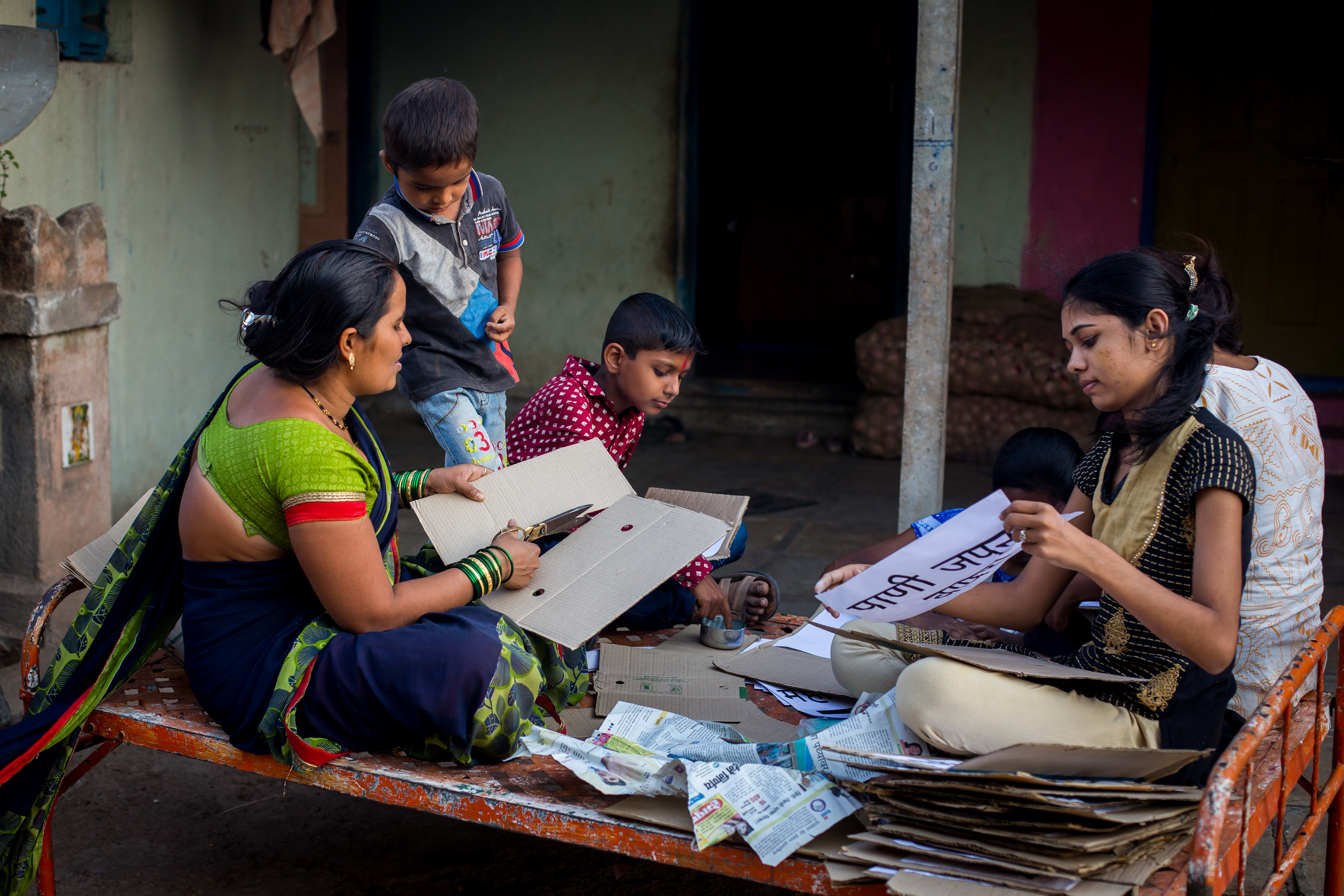
Villagers prepare for the upcoming Satyamev Jayate Water Cup 2018.

=== Rules and guidelines ===
The Foundation provides training on technical aspects and social leadership to a small number of representatives from each village before the competition. These representatives (called Jal doot or 'water messengers') are expected to return to their villages and mobilize fellow villagers to work on watershed management structures around the village. The competition rules stress on the importance of shramdaan (volunteer labour) by people. The Foundation itself does not provide financial assistance to carry out works, except bearing the costs of the training program and prizes for the winners. The villages are expected to arrange for finances from internal, government or private sources. The Foundation also has several partner organizations that lease machinery such as excavators, JCBs or offer other expertise to the participating villages, free of cost. However any material or fuel costs have to be borne by the village.

=== Status ===
The Foundation organized the first Satyamev Jayate Water Cup competition in 2016. The idea was tested in 3 talukas, with 116 villages in its first year. Subsequently, the competition expanded to include several talukas and thousands of villages in the state in the next two years. The foundation began modestly by selecting only 3 tehsils for the mission, but has scaled up to as many as 4,032 villages spread over 75 drought-hit tehsils in four regions of Maharashtra—Marathwada, Vidarbha, North Maharashtra, and Western Maharashtra in 2018. In 2016 and 2017, the participating villages created an aggregate storage capacity of 100 billion litres of water.They also encourage villages which are now water sufficient to take up permaculture.

Scope of Satyamev Jayate Water Cup
Year	Number of talukas	Number of villages covered
2016	3	116
2017	30	1321
2018	75	4025
2019	76	4400

== Funding and associated organizations ==
Paani Foundation is supported by some well-known Indian businesspersons and philanthropic organizations such as the Tata Trusts headed by Ratan Tata, Reliance Foundation, Rajiv Bajaj, Deepak Parekh, and Ajay Piramal. The funds are used by Paani Foundation for administration of the competition, training camps and prizes.

The Ahmednagar-based Watershed Organization Trust (WOTR) is the Foundation's Knowledge Partner. It creates content and imparts technical training to participants during training camps. Bharatiya Jain Sanghatana (BJS), a Pune-based non-profit organization, was also associated with the Foundation. In 2018, it donated free machine usage hours to villages which have achieved a certain level of work through manual labour.

In 2019, for the fourth Water Cup, Paani Foundation joined hands with Ahmednagar-based NGO Snehalaya to raise and route all funds received via donations, towards machine support for villages.
