= Rubaru Roshni =

2019 Indian anthology documentary film

- Film poster
- Directed by: Svati Chakravarty Bhatkal
- Produced by: Aamir Khan; Kiran Rao
- Narrated by: Aamir Khan
- Cinematography: Shanti Bhushan Roy
- Edited by: Hemanti Sarkar
- Music by: Aditya-Nayantara
- Production company: Aamir Khan Productions
- Release date: 26 January 2019
- Running time: 108 minutes
- Country: India
- Language: Hindi

Rubaru Roshni is a 2019 Indian anthology documentary film directed by Svati Chakravarty Bhatkal. Narrated by Aamir Khan and produced by Khan and Kiran Rao, it tells three real life stories in a first-person account of both the victims and the perpetrators of violence; the murders of Lalit Maken and his wife, the murder of Mariam Vattalil and the 2008 Mumbai attacks are covered. The documentary premiered on 26 January 2019 in seven languages on all Star Network channels, and later released through the streaming platforms Hotstar and Netflix.

== Development ==
Bhatkal had worked with Khan on the latter's television show Satyamev Jayate. After it was finished, she read an article about Lalit Maken's daughter and the killer of Mariam Vattalil. She said that it "struck a chord" and she decided to investigate. Khan quickly showed interest into producing it after hearing the idea for Bhatkal, which was made completely unscripted. The documentary was originally titled Where the Light Comes In, which Bhatkal had derived from one of the poems written by Rumi. Later, Khan suggested her a Hindi title, and was named as Rubaru Roshini, after a song derived from the same name, composed by A. R. Rahman for Rang De Basanti.

== Music ==
The theme song for the documentary "Sehmi Si Aankiyon" is composed by the duo Aditya-Nayantara. It was released in six languages – Hindi, Tamil, Telugu, Malayalam, Bengali and Marathi by the record label T-Series. The song had lyrics written by Amitabh Bhattacharya, Ravichander Venkatesan, Srinivas Jorigala, Jayakumar Nair, Sumitro Mukherjee and Vinod Kulkarni for the respective languages, with vocals by Nayantara Bhatkal in all languages.

== Release ==
Rubaru Roshini was initially intended for a theatrical release, but Aamir Khan decided to premiere the film on television channels, so that it may have a wide reach towards the audience and partnered with Star India to broadcast the film. A special screening was held in Mumbai on 23 January 2019, and was attended by prominent film and television personalities. The film premiered on 26 January 2019 (Republic Day) in Star World and Star Plus (English), Star Bharat (Hindi), Star Vijay (Tamil), Star Maa (Telugu), Asianet (Malayalam), Star Jalsha (Bengali) and Star Pravah (Marathi) with English subtitles, as to coincide the anniversary of Rang De Basanti. In addition to the television premiere, the film was also streamed on Hotstar on the same date.

In the premiere screening show, Khan revealed that Netflix was keen to acquire the streaming rights, but failed to do saw after he joined partnership with Star India to stream the film in television and digital services. Later, Netflix premiered the film occasionally on 15 August 2019 (India's Independence Day).

== Reception ==
Peter Griffin of The Hindu wrote: "More than [Svati's] filmmaking skills — which are evident — what shines through is her feel for story, her empathy, her ability to probe beyond the surface, to step back from the easy slope of bathos." Sreehari Nair of Rediff.com said, "Svati Chakravarty Bhatkal knows how to ask sharp questions without being hostile, and Rubaru Roshni offers a steady accumulation of perspectives when it is purely a dialogue between Bhatkal and the participants." Subhash K. Jha called the film "profoudly moving" and "therapeutic". Sana Farzeen from The Indian Express wrote: "In a time when violence and hatred have become a normal affair, Rubaru Roshni makes you sit up and introspect about things around you."

Johnson Thomas of The Free Press Journal called it a "rare documentation of humaneness – one that elevates the experience of it to uncharted heights!" Udita Jhunjhunwala of Firstpost observed that the film makes us "sympathise with the victims and survivors of course, but the gut-punch comes as you get an insight into the psyche and motivations of the criminals." The Quint's Urmi Bhattacheryya wrote: "What stands out about Rubaru Roshni is its depiction of raw emotional vulnerabilities – a theme that’s bound to touch a nerve, almost universally." Manik Sharma of Arre said that it "stands on its own, as an atypically arresting Indian film that demands much more than the platitudes of violence and revenge we are familiar as a nation with."
