= Snipe (theatrical) =

Promo material used in movie theaters

A snipe in the motion picture exhibition business includes filmed material shown before the feature presentation other than a trailer, such as "welcome to our theater", courtesy trailers ("no smoking, littering, talking"), promotions for the snack bar, and "daters", which announce the date for an upcoming show.

Snipes sometimes promote local events, places or merchants as a music track plays during intermissions.

A snipe may also be a printed sticker or other material provided to be pasted over other print material such as posters or souvenir programs, in order to alter or add information.

== See also ==
- Snipe (graphic) - promotional overlay during a television program
- Let's All Go to the Lobby
