= Satyajit Bhatkal =

Indian television and film director

Satyajit Bhatkal is an Indian television and film director, best known as director of Satyamev Jayate, a TV show focused on addressing social issues in India.

He is CEO of Paani Foundation, a non-profit founded by Aamir Khan and Kiran Rao, aimed at making Maharashtra drought-free.

== Filmography ==
Film
Year	Title	Director	Writer	Notes	Ref.
2001	Lagaan: Once Upon a Time in India	No	No	Miscellaneous crew (production executive)	
2004	Madness in the Desert aka Chale Chalo: The lunacy of film making	Yes	Yes	Documentary film on making of the Lagaan; National Film Award for Best Exploration/Adventure Film	
2011	Zokkomon	Yes	Yes		
2012–2014	Satyamev Jayate	Yes	No	TV series aired on Star Network and DD National	
