= Dhobi Ghat (film) =

2010 film directed by Kiran Rao

- Theatrical release poster
- Directed by: Kiran Rao
- Written by: Kiran Rao
- Produced by: Aamir Khan; Kiran Rao
- Starring: Prateik; Monica Dogra; Kriti Malhotra; Aamir Khan
- Cinematography: Tushar Kanti Ray
- Edited by: Nishant Radhakrishnan
- Music by: Gustavo Santaolalla
- Production company: Aamir Khan Productions
- Distributed by: UTV Motion Pictures
- Release dates: September 2010 (TIFF); 21 January 2011 (India)
- Running time: 102 minutes
- Country: India
- Languages: Hindi; English
- Budget: ₹40 crore
- Box office: ₹25.6 crore

Dhobi Ghat (transl. The washerman's ghat), released internationally as Mumbai Diaries and Bombay Diaries, is a 2010 Indian drama film directed by Kiran Rao in her directorial debut. The film was produced by Rao and Aamir Khan, and stars Prateik Babbar, Monica Dogra, Kriti Malhotra and Khan in the lead roles. Gustavo Santaolalla was signed to compose the score and soundtrack of the film, which includes a song by Ryuichi Sakamoto.

Dhobi Ghat had its world premiere in September 2010 at the Toronto International Film Festival and was released on 21 January 2011 in cinemas. The film being mainly tagged as an art and parallel cinema was critically well-received, although it was an average performer at the box office. The film was longlisted for the 65th BAFTA Awards in the Best Film Not in the English Language category.

== Plot ==
Arun, a reclusive artist, moves into a run-down flat in the older part of Mumbai. After attending an exhibition of his works, he meets Shai, an American banker who has come to Mumbai to devote time to her hobby, photography, and takes her back to his flat, where they have a one-night stand. The next morning, Arun expresses his disinterest in continuing the relationship, and Shai angrily storms out.

Shortly after, Zohaib “Munna” Shaikh, a dhobi (washerman) who dreams about getting a break in Bollywood, arrives to deliver Arun's laundry. Arun moves into a new apartment the next day. While unpacking, he finds a small container that had been left by the previous tenant, Yasmin, of the apartment. In it, he finds a silver chain, a ring, and three videotapes (Pehli chitti, Doosri chitti and Aakhri chitti) by Yasmin Noor. The tapes turn out to be video diaries through which Yasmin communicates with her brother. In the tape, she is generally happy and shows her apartment, which is the same one Arun is occupying now. The next morning, Arun is informed by his manager that art dealers, impressed with his art, have decided to open a gallery in Sydney featuring his works. Arun is pleased by this, as it would also give him a chance to visit his ex-wife and child, settled in Australia. He begins to work on a new painting.

When Munna delivers laundry to Shai's house, they meet and soon become friends. Munna agrees to show Shai around Mumbai and help her gather photographs about the occupations of the poor. In return, Shai agrees to shoot a portfolio of Munna to help him get into the film industry. Arun continues watching Yasmin's tapes and learns more about her life, including that she has recently married a man who seems distant. Shai obtains Arun's new address from Munna. Shai's father's construction company is constructing a building opposite Arun's apartment. Shai starts shooting photos of Arun from the construction site without Arun being aware of it.

Munna continues struggling to find work in films. To earn a living, he washes clothes by day and kills rats by night. He disapproves of his brother's criminal activity but they are close, and Munna's brother uses his underworld contacts to try to get Munna a break in the industry. In the meantime, Munna shows Shai the different facets of Mumbai, including the dhobi ghaat, where he works as a launderer. Munna develops feelings for Shai but is unable to express them, mostly because of his working-class status. One day, Arun spots Shai nearby and invites her to his house. He apologizes for their first meeting. Munna sees them together and feels betrayed but Shai is able to convince him to keep helping her. One night, while Munna is at his rat-killing job, Shai sees him and takes pictures. Dismayed, Munna flees from her.

Arun watches the final video by Yasmin. Her tone has changed considerably since the previous tape, in which she revealed learning that her husband was in an extramarital affair. She strongly indicates that she intends to commit suicide. Shaken by the knowledge that Yasmin might have hanged herself in that very room, Arun flees the apartment and moves into a new one. Munna arrives home to find that his brother has been killed. He and his family relocate to a new flat and Munna visits his brother's contact in the film industry to show him his portfolio.

Arun studies the painting he has been working on, which is now complete. Yasmin is prominently featured along with other things she had left behind. Shortly after, Shai finds Munna and Munna again tries to flee her, but she catches up with him. She insists upon their friendship and asks about Arun's whereabouts. Still hurt, Munna lies to her and they exchange an abrupt farewell before Shai leaves. Moments later, Munna changes his mind and runs after Shai's car, weaving through the traffic. The film ends when Munna catches up to the car and gives Shai Arun's new address.

== Cast ==
- Prateik Smita Patil as Zohaib "Munna" Shaikh
- Monica Dogra as Shai Edulji
- Kriti Malhotra as Yasmin Noor
- Aamir Khan as Arun
- Kitu Gidwani as Vatsala
- Danish Hussain as Salim
- Jehan Manekshaw as Pesi
- Ashok Varma as Yasmin's Husband
- Nafisa Amin Khan as Amma
- Sunny Charles as a taxi driver
- Aditi Rao Hydari as guest at art gallery

== Music ==
The soundtrack of the film was composed by Academy Award-winning Gustavo Santaolalla and includes a song by Ryuichi Sakamoto. All of the songs were only included in the film. No soundtrack of Dhobi Ghat was released in the market.

No.	Title	Lyrics	Length
1.	"Stranger Lives"	Gustavo Santaolalla	7:33
2.	"You With Me"	Ryuichi Sakamoto	6:45
3.	"Ghat Kaisi"	Monica Dogra and Gustavo Santaolalla	3:12

Two other songs included in the movie are "Ab Ke Sawaan Ghar Aazaa" which is a thumri in Raga Tilak Kamod sung by Begum Akhtar and "Dil Tadap Tadap Ke Kah Raha Hai Aa Bhi Ja" which is from the film Madhumati and sung by Mukesh and Lata Mangeshkar.

== Production ==
In an interview, Rao expressed that the film was meant to be a tribute to Mumbai and that she sought to reveal other sides of the city not often portrayed. The film was shot in Mumbai using "guerilla" techniques. Due to the 2008 Mumbai attacks, shooting was delayed when, citing safety concerns, the government denied Rao permission to shoot scenes at a railway station. According to the director, Mumbai is the "fifth character" in Dhobi Ghat.

The movie was shot at skycrapers under construction, Mohammed Ali markets, sea facing bungalows at Worli, Dhobi Ghat at Mahalaxmi, Chowpatty and Marine Drive. No special sets were constructed to shoot the movie. The movie was released in 2 versions. The original version is around 40% English, while the second version has all dialogue dubbed in Hindi.

Rapid Eye Movies, a German distributor bought the rights for the film's theatrical release in Germany. Dhobi Ghat was released in theatres without an intermission, becoming one of the few Indian films to do so.

== Release ==
In spite of some expletives, the film was originally passed with a U/A certificate by the Central Board of Film Certification, but Khan did not want "parents to come with their eight year olds for it", and hence got it re-certified with an A certificate. He felt this was him "reducing his audience by half". On the other hand, the film received a 12A classification from the British Board of Film Classification for theatrical release, and a 12 rating for home video release.

== Critical reception ==
Upon release, the film received mostly positive reviews from critics, and review aggregation website Rotten Tomatoes gave the film a score of 70%, with an average score of 6.8/10. Bhawana Somaaya, senior editor of Ticket Please gave the film a five out of five stars, stating that "Rao portrays the drudgery and the magnificence of the city in unforgettable imageries". She also says that "There is no doubting that Dhobi Ghat is amongst the most significant films in the history of Indian cinema" Blessy Chettiar, film critic of Daily News and Analysis wrote, "With Dhobi Ghat, Kiran Rao finally gives Mumbai a film that represents its true hues and tints." Mathures Paul of The Statesman gave the film four stars out of five noting that, "Dhobi Ghat is part atmospheric portrait, part video diary that has enough heart-breaking moments you don't want to watch. But neither can you look away". Pratim D. Gupta of The Telegraph compared Dhobi Ghat with Satyajit Ray's Charulata in the way that the five characters, including Mumbai, operate like a string quintet. Mayank Shekhar of the Hindustan Times gave the film three and a half stars stating, "Bombay, is the centre of this film's attention. It's probably the only city in the world where so many classes so closely merge into a common river of sorrows, beauty or hope: unaware of how each affects the other every day. This film is first-rate tribute; it's visceral, I realize -- both clichés for compliments. Nothing more appropriate comes to mind." Anupama Chopra of NDTV gave the film three stars, stating, "If you are willing to have patience, Dhobi Ghat comes together nicely. It has a poetry and melancholy that stays with you." "Dhobi Ghat is a Poetry on Canvas!" said Swati Deogire of The ILIKE Times giving it a 3.5/5" Gaurav Malani of India Times Movies gave the film two stars, stating "Dhobi Ghat is a pretentious attempt at producing an arthouse piece".

== Box office ==
In spite of being an art film with dark theme, Dhobi Ghat grossed ₹140 million (US$1.5 million) after its theatrical run in India. Besides, Dhobi Ghat did well in the overseas markets including USA, UK and Dubai collecting ₹42.5 million (US$440,000) after the second weekend. The movie completed its overseas theatrical run with a collection of about $2.6 million. Aamir Khan commented on Dhobi Ghat's success saying, "I am very happy with Dhobi Ghat's collection. Films like 'Dhobi Ghat' are really breaking grounds. It's a very unusual film and the kind of business it has done is huge for this kind of film. The kind of budget the film was made at, it's a very successful film. It made double the money it had cost us to make the film.". Boxofficeindia.com declared the film as "Average".
