= Delhi Belly (soundtrack) =

Delhi Belly (Original Motion Picture Soundtrack)

Soundtrack album by Ram Sampath
- Released: 27 May 2011
- Recorded: 2010–2011
- Genre: Feature film soundtrack
- Length: 35:07
- Languages: Hindi, Awadhi
- Label: Sony Music India
- Producer: Ram Sampath

Ram Sampath chronology
Luv Ka The End (2011)	Delhi Belly (Original Motion Picture Soundtrack) (2011)	Talaash (2012)

Delhi Belly (Original Motion Picture Soundtrack) is the soundtrack album to the 2011 Hindi-language action comedy film of the same name directed by Abhinay Deo. The film's musical score is composed by Ram Sampath and featured 10 songs with lyrics written by Amitabh Bhattacharya, Akshat Verma, Munna Dhiman, Chetan Shashital and Sampath himself. The soundtrack was released under the Sony Music India label on 27 May 2011.

The initial script of the film had scope for one song, but after the film went through numerous post-production phases, Sampath had composed 10 songs during that period. The lyrics were curated from the expletives provided by Verma to set the tone of the film. Sampath curated punk rock and funk tunes blended with Indian folk influences.

The soundtrack was acclaimed by critics for its experimentation and genre blend, but also met with criticism for the expletive lyrics, especially the promotional number "Bhaag D.K. Bose" which faced massive outrage from people after it was played in theatres and national televisions. Sampath received a nomination for the Best Music Director at the 57th Filmfare Awards among other accolades.

== Production ==
Originally, Shankar–Ehsaan–Loy associated with the film as music composers. Deo then recommended Sampath's name to the film's presenter Aamir Khan, as they worked together in advertisements where Sampath had scored jingles. Khan and the trio eventually accepted on Sampath's inclusion.

Like his earlier films, Sampath wanted to show love and heartbreak through his music and discussed with scriptwriter Akshat Verma about a variety of musical genres which influenced the album. Verma helped him set the tone of the film by adding expletives and hook lines, providing cues for the lyrics. Initially, the film consisted of only one song "I Hate You (Like I Love You)", but during the period when the film stuck in the edit table for two years, Samptah composed nearly ten songs for the film. He added "the film is one entity and the songs are another entity and where the two meet and traverse is the high point."

The album was developed for six months under the working title Delhi Belly: Songs Of Heartbreak & Hip-Shake, albeit it was unclear whether most of the songs would be included in the album. However, Khan listened to all of the tracks and liked it, which eventually led it to be used in the film.

== Composition ==
Sampath wanted to compose a punk rock songs with eastern influences, which resulted in the composition of "Bhaag D.K. Bose." The song was performed by Sampath in his debut as a playback singer; he did so on Khan and Kiran Rao's insistence after the latter listened to his scratch recording. Verma came up with the idea of the phrase "D. K. Bose" which was approved as it suited the theme of the film. The phrase being juxtaposed and sung at a quick pace forms a popular expletive in North India. He claimed that since the song was not a part of a situation and more of a promotional number, he had more scope to experiment with it.

The song "Bedardi Raja" was sung by Sampath's wife Sona Mohapatra and written by Bhattacharya in an "unbelievably funny, risqué and charming" way and sounded like "modern Kotha music". The cue "Saigal Blues" was written by Chetan Shashital and Sampath as an independent single before being used in the film; he considered the songs as a mixture between Saigal saab and the Rolling Stones. "Nakkadwaley Disco, Udhaarwaley Khisko" was described as a "sad qawwali played by a funk band". "Switty" is a punk number which was a spoof on the "idiotic testosterone-fuelled stalker male stereotype who thinks he's being romantic". He described the romantic number "Tere Siva" as the only earnest song in the film, that addresses Tashi's state of mind.

== Reception ==
Jaspreet Pandohar of BBC wrote "Fresh, frenetic and wickedly funny, Delhi Belly is more than the sum of its parts. Not a duff note or bad lyric amongst them, the songs work equally well on their own – but as a collection, this is destined to become a cult classic." Nikhil Hemrajani of Hindustan Times rated three out of five and summarized: "Delhi Belly’s soundtrack is like a box of candy. Every song is a treat and the album’s unique sound hasn’t been heard before in Bollywood music. Although Sampath has referenced Tarantino’s music quite a bit, the end result is pleasing." A reviewer from News18 wrote "the music is unusual, breaks monotony and is far from being typical".

Joginder Tuteja of Bollywood Hungama wrote "Delhi Belly is a good album, not excellent that one would have imagined after seeing the promos and hearing a couple of smash hits numbers [...] However the craze of 'D.K. Bose' has been such that just this track is good enough to make the album top the charts. Also, it is pretty much expected that the item number, as and when it makes an appearance in a music video, would help the album sales as well. All of this would ensure that the album not just manages a good 'initial' for itself in terms of sales at the stands but also stays in demand for weeks to come."

Karthik Srinivasan of Milliblog wrote "Delhi Belly almost seems like a cleansing act for what Ram did in his last Bollywood outing and the result is one kick-ass ingenious soundtrack". Sameer Chhabra of Music Aloud called "Delhi Belly is undoubtedly Ram Sampath's best work to date." Sampada Sharma of The Indian Express wrote "Ram Sampath's excellent and catchy tunes might have created some controversies (with Bhaag DK Bose) but tracks like Bedardi Raja, I Hate You Like I Love You and Switty Tera Pyaar are such zingers and flow with the film quite perfectly."

Delhi Belly was ranked at number 89 on Top 100 Bollywood Albums by Film Companion.

== Controversy ==
Upon release, the song "Bhaag D.K. Bose" met with massive criticism for its double entendre and obscene lyrics. Many people objected to it being played on theatres with U-certified films, even though Delhi Belly received an A certificate from the Central Board of Film Certification (CBFC) and also aired on national televisions. The Information and Broadcasting Ministry wrote a letter to the CBFC asking them on how the song was cleared.

The musical trio Shankar–Ehsaan–Loy admitted that they won't make a song similar to "Bhaag D.K. Bose" because of its vulgarity. Amitabh Bachchan also condemned the same, whereas Khan responded to his comments by singing the controversial lyrics of the song at a press interaction.

The song also met with copyright infringement after Jiten Thukral and Sumir Tagra registered their trademark "BoseDK" at their first exhibition at Gallery Nature Morte in 2005. Aamir who was unaware of the registered trademark, had acknowledged that the phrase being their property, amicabling resolving the issue. He added "Before they approached me, I wasn't aware of the similarity between their label and the song title. I am here to acknowledge the fact that the phrase is their label. We don't have any claim over it at all."

== Track listing ==
Delhi Belly (Original Motion Picture Soundtrack) track listing
No.	Title	Lyrics	Performer(s)	Length
1.	"Bhaag D.K. Bose"	Amitabh Bhattacharya, Akshat Verma	Ram Sampath	4:02
2.	"Nakkaddwaley Disco, Udhaarwaley Khisko"	Akshat Verma, Munna Dhiman	Keerthi Sagathia	3:58
3.	"Saigal Blues"	Chetan Shashital, Ram Sampath	Chetan Shashital	3:56
4.	"Bedardi Raja"	Amitabh Bhattacharya	Sona Mohapatra	2:58
5.	"Jaa Chudail"	Amitabh Bhattacharya, Akshat Verma	Suraj Jagan	3:18
6.	"Tere Siva"	Munna Dhiman	Ram Sampath, Tarannum Mallik	4:40
7.	"Switty Tera Pyaar Chaida"	Munna Dhiman	Keerthi Sagathia	2:54
8.	"I Hate You" (Like I Love You)	Akshat Verma, Ram Sampath	Keerthi Sagathia, Shazneen Arethna, Sona Mohapatra, Aamir Khan	5:50
9.	"Bedardi Raja" (Remix)	Amitabh Bhattacharya	Sona Mohapatra	3:04
10.	"Switty" (Punk)	Munna Dhiman	Keerthi Sagathia, Ram Sampath	3:30
Total length:				35:07

== Accolades ==
Accolades for Delhi Belly (Original Motion Picture Soundtrack)
Ceremony	Category	Recipient	Result
57th Filmfare Awards	Best Music Director	Ram Sampath	Nominated
18th Colors Screen Awards	Best Music Director	Ram Sampath	Nominated
18th Colors Screen Awards	Best Background Music	Ram Sampath	Nominated
18th Colors Screen Awards	Best Male Playback Singer	Ram Sampath for "Bhaag D.K. Bose"	Nominated
4th Mirchi Music Awards	Upcoming Female Vocalist of The Year	Shazneen Arethna for "I Hate You (Like I Love You)"	Nominated
4th Mirchi Music Awards	Upcoming Lyricist of the Year	Akshat Verma fir "I Hate You (Like I Love You)"	Nominated
4th Mirchi Music Awards	Best Item Song of the Year	"I Hate You (Like I Love You)"	Nominated
4th Mirchi Music Awards	Best Programmer & Arranger of the Year	"Bhaag D.K. Bose"	Nominated
4th Mirchi Music Awards	Best Background Score of the Year	Ram Sampath	Won
