= Talaash: The Answer Lies Within (soundtrack) =

Soundtrack album by Ram Sampath
- Released: 18 October 2012
- Recorded: 2010–2012
- Studio: OmGrown Studios, Mumbai; Sterling Sound Studios, New York
- Genre: Feature film soundtrack
- Length: 26:22
- Language: Hindi
- Label: T-Series
- Producer: Ram Sampath

Ram Sampath chronology
Delhi Belly (2011)	Talaash: The Answer Lies Within (2012)	Fukrey (2013)

Talaash: The Answer Lies Within is the soundtrack album to the 2012 film of the same name directed by Reema Kagti and produced by Excel Entertainment and Aamir Khan Productions, starring Aamir Khan, Kareena Kapoor Khan and Rani Mukerji. The film's soundtrack featured five original songs and a remix version composed by Ram Sampath with lyrics written by Javed Akhtar. The album was released under the T-Series label on 18 October 2012 to positive critical reviews and nominated for numerous accolades.

== Development ==
Ram Sampath was brought onboard for the film, after being recommended by Khan, as the former had worked with him in his production Delhi Belly (2011) and also curated the theme music for the television show Satyamev Jayate (2012–2014). Farhan Akhtar was also instrumental in Sampath's involvement, as the company had initially listed on several music directors before Sampath being the unanimous choice. Kagti, recalled that when she first met Sampath, she was instantly connected with him as both share similar sensibilities. They discussed on creating the music that should be part of a narrative and also act as a suspense element. Since Sampath was also working on Khan's television show Satyamev Jayate, whose delay on the premiere, meant that he could not compose the background score, the producers opted to postpone Talaash from its initial 1 June 2012 release to the 30 November release.

== Release ==
Producer Ritesh Sidwani announced the plans for the music launch in late October, at a suburban hotel in Mumbai. For the event, the team replicated a set of the Hotel Lido, a red-light area, where the film's story takes place; Ritesh added that "Hotel Lido is not just a location or a set but almost like an important character in the film. Hence, we thought we should come up with an idea that is not only engaging but also relevant to the film." Sharmishta Roy worked on replicating the sets that resembles the particular area, and the team also contacted junior artists, for creating an authentic ambience. The soundtrack was released on 2 November 2012, with the attendance of Khan, Mukerji, Kagti, Farhan, Javed and Sampath, however, Kapoor was not involved in the event. The album was further released in digital and physical formats.

== Reception ==
The album met with highly positive reviews from music critics. Sukanya Verma of Rediff.com reviewed, "Except a steady undercurrent of anxiety, the soundtrack of Talaash: The Answer Lies Within doesn't have a fixed theme or ambiance. Every song belongs to a unique genre and fosters the enigma of Kagti's suspense drama. And that's what makes Sampath's efforts truly appreciable." A reviewer based at Indo-Asian News Service quoted, "the soundtrack is not out-of-the-box, but the overdose of electronic music doesn't bother either. Thus, it's an album which may not top the charts, but some songs could definitely make their way into many people's personal playlists."

Another reviewer from Hindustan Times summarized "there's too much electronica in it — but it's worth a listen." Karthik Srinivasan of Milliblog wrote "The Aamir Khan – Ram Sampath combination continues to rock after Delhi Belly; Talaash's soundtrack is short, but enchantingly deft". Anand Holla of The Times of India wrote "While it's tough to deftly follow up a refreshing, trend-bending album like Delhi Belly, Ram stacks up a sleek, above par track-list for Aamir's next. There may not be standouts here and yet there is much to indulge in, if good music is what you are in talaash (search) of." Vipin Nair of Film Companion picked "Muskaanein Jhooti Hai" as one of Sampath's best works, despite being overshadowed by "Jee Le Zara" and "Jiya Laage Na"; he further added "The song has a thematically dark, intriguing melody delivered excellently by Suman Sridhar while the composer backs her up with a fine jazz-based orchestration (note the amazing use of double bass)."

== Track listing ==
No.	Title	Singer(s)	Length
1.	"Muskaanein Jhooti Hai"	Suman Sridhar	3:20
2.	"Jee Le Zara"	Vishal Dadlani	3:37
3.	"Jiya Laage Na"	Sona Mohapatra, Ravindra Upadhyay	4:37
4.	"Laakh Duniya Kahe"	Ram Sampath	6:04
5.	"Hona Hai Kya"	Ram Sampath, Rupesh	4:43
6.	"Jee Le Zara" (Remix)	Vishal Dadlani	3:59
Total length:			29:18

== Accolades ==
Award	Category	Recipient(s) and nominee(s)	Result	Ref(s)
Filmfare Awards	Best Lyricist	Javed Akhtar – ("Jee Le Zara")	Nominated	
Mirchi Music Awards	Lyricist of The Year	Javed Akhtar – ("Jee Le Zara")	Won	
Mirchi Music Awards	Male Vocalist of The Year	Vishal Dadlani – ("Jee Le Zara")	Nominated	
Mirchi Music Awards	Upcoming Female Vocalist of The Year	Suman Sridhar – ("Muskaanein Jhooti Hai")	Nominated	
Mirchi Music Awards	Raag-Inspired Song of the Year	"Jiya Laage Na"	Nominated	
Mirchi Music Awards	Programmer and Arranger of the Year	Ram Sampath and Vrashal Chavan – ("Jiya Laage Na")	Nominated	
Times of India Film Awards	Best Lyricist	Javed Akhtar – ("Jee Le Zara")	Nominated	
Times of India Film Awards	Best Female Playback Singer	Suman Sridhar – ("Muskaanein Jhooti Hai")	Nominated	
Zee Cine Awards	Best Lyricist	Javed Akhtar – ("Jee Le Zara")	Nominated	
