= Coke Studio @ MTV season 2 =

Season of television series

Coke Studio @ MTV
- Season 2
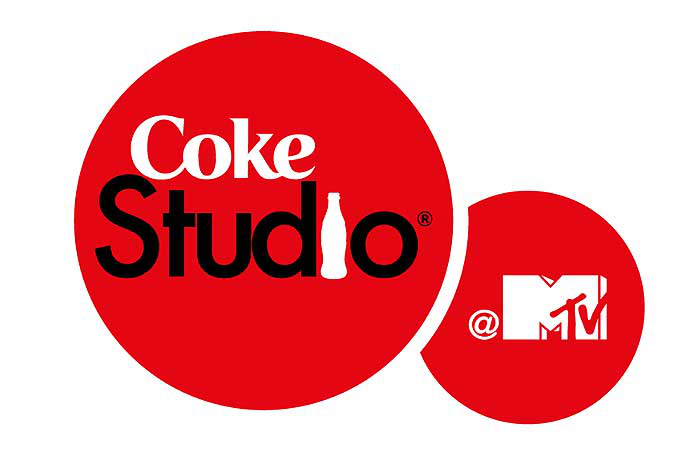
- Starring: Vocalists
- No. of episodes: 10

Release
- Original network: MTV India; YouTube
- Original release: July 7 – September 8, 2012

Season chronology
- ← Previous; Season 1 Next → Season 3

The second season of the Indian music television series, Coke Studio @ MTV, aired from 7 July 2012, to 8 September 2012. The season comprised eight regular episodes and two "Best of Coke Studio @ MTV Season 2" episodes, showcasing a total of 45 songs.

== Artists ==
=== Vocalists ===
- Agam
- Alisha Batth
- Altamash Faridi
- Amit Trivedi
- Apeksha Dandekar
- Arun Daga
- Ashwin Srinivasan
- Banjyotsana Borgohain
- Benny Dayal
- Bhanu Pratap Singh
- Bianca Gomes
- Bonnie Chakraborty
- Clinton Cerejo
- Devender Pal Singh
- Dhruv Sangari
- Divya Kumar
- Dominique Cerejo
- Hari & Sukhmani
- Harshdeep Kaur
- Jasbir Jassi
- Jyoti Nooran
- Karsh Kale
- Kaushiki Chakrabarty
- La Pongal
- Mahalakshmi Iyer
- Mahesh Vinayakraman
- Mame Khan
- Mami Varte
- Mandeep Sethi
- Master Saleem
- Mili Nair
- Monali Thakur
- Mooralala Marwada
- Nandini Srikar
- Natalie Di Luccio
- Nicki Wells
- Papon
- Piyush Mishra
- Pranav Biswas
- Prasad Khaparde
- Raghubir Yadav
- Salim Merchant
- Samidha Joglekar
- Sawan Khan Manganiyar
- Shadaab Faridi
- Sharodee Borah
- Shilpa Rao
- Shriram Iyer
- Shruti Pathak
- Sonu Kakkar
- Sugandha Garg
- Sultana Nooran
- Suman Sridhar
- Swanand Kirkire
- Usha Uthup
- Vijay Prakash
- Vishal Dadlani
- Zila Khan

== Production ==
The season featured a new multi-producer format, with each episode produced by a different musi producer. The finale (or eighth episode) even featured multiple producers collaborating. This new approach was implemented after mixed reviews for the previous season, which had a single producer. The music producers for this season were (listed alphabetically):

- Agam
- Amit Trivedi
- Ash Roy
- Ashvin Mani Sharma
- Clinton Cerejo
- Dhruv Sangari
- Ehsaan & Loy
- Hari & Sukhmani
- Hitesh Sonik
- Karsh Kale
- Nitin Sawhney
- Papon
- Shantanu Moitra

The season's production was handled by Red Chillies Idiot Box, with Samar Khan serving as the show producer. The creative direction was overseen by Nishant Nayak, while the art direction was managed by Varsha Jain and Durgaprasad Mahapatra. Sony Music India was the music partner, and ABP News was the news partner for the season.

== Episodes ==
No. overall	No. in season	Song Title	Singer(s)	Lyricist(s)	Language(s)	Original release date
Produced & composed by Clinton Cerejo
11	1	"Saathi Salaam"	Sawan Khan Manganiyar & Clinton Cerejo	Traditional Sindhi & Manoj Yadav	Sindhi & Hindi	July 7, 2012
11	1	"Banjara"	Nandini Srikar & Vijay Prakash	Traditional Indian & Manoj Yadav	Hindi	July 7, 2012
11	1	"Madari"	Vishal Dadlani & Sonu Kakkar	Traditional Indian & Manoj Yadav	Hindi & Punjabi	July 7, 2012
11	1	"Chhadh De"	Master Saleem	Traditional Indian & Manoj Yadav	Hindi	July 7, 2012
11	1	"Mauje Naina"	Altamash Faridi, Bianca Gomes & Shadaab Faridi	Manoj Yadav & Ajinkya Iyer	Hindi & English	July 7, 2012
11	1	"Dungar"	Sawan Khan Manganiyar	Traditional Sindhi & Psalm 61	Sindhi & English	July 7, 2012
Produced & composed by Hitesh Sonik
12	2	"Husna"	Piyush Mishra	Piyush Mishra	Hindi	July 14, 2012
12	2	"Vari Jaun"	Moora Lala & Suman Sridhar	Traditional Indian & Munna Dhiman	Kutchi & Hindi	July 14, 2012
12	2	"Do Gallan"	Alisha Batth & Vijay Prakash	Munna Dhiman	Punjabi & Kannada	July 14, 2012
12	2	"Allah Hoo"	Jyoti Nooran & Sultana Nooran	Traditional Indian	Punjabi	July 14, 2012
12	2	"Hey Ri"	Harshdeep Kaur	Traditional Indian	Hindi	July 14, 2012
12	2	"Lamh Tera"	Raghubir Yadav	Traditional Indian & Raghubir Yadav	Hindi	July 14, 2012
Produced & composed by Amit Trivedi
13	3	"Baari Baari"	Amit Trivedi, Natalie Di Luccio & Shriram Iyer	Shellee	Hindi	July 21, 2012
13	3	"Badri Badariya"	Mame Khan and Mili Nair	Kausar Munir	Hindi & Marwari	July 21, 2012
13	3	"Chaudhary"	Mame Khan	Shellee	Hindi & Marwari	July 21, 2012
13	3	"Nirmohiya"	Harshdeep Kaur & Devender Pal Singh	Amitabh Bhattacharya & Jasleen Bhalla	Punjabi	July 21, 2012
13	3	"Yatra"	Shriram Iyer & Mili Nair	Swanand Kirkire	Hindi	July 21, 2012
Produced & composed by Nitin Sawhney
14	4	"Nadia"	Nicki Wells & Ashwin Srinivasan	Traditional Indian	Hindi & Sanskrit	July 28, 2012
14	4	"Vachan"	Mahesh Vinayakraman, Nicki Wells & Samidha Joglekar	Saroj Sawhney	Hindi	July 28, 2012
14	4	"Sunset"	Nicki Wells & Samidha Joglekar	Nitin Sawhney	Bengali & English	July 28, 2012
14	4	"Saahil Tak"	Ashwin Srinivasan, Papon & Samidha Joglekar	Saroj Sawhney	Hindi	July 28, 2012
14	4	"Longing"	Ashwin Srinivasan, Nicki Wells & Samidha Joglekar	Saroj Sawhney	Hindi & English	July 28, 2012
14	4	"Tere Khayal"	Ashwin Srinivasan, Nicki Wells & Prasad Khaparde	Saroj Sawhney	Hindi	July 28, 2012
Produced & composed by Ehsaan & Loy
15	5	"Subhan Allah"	Jasbir Jassi	Traditional Indian	Punjabi	August 4, 2012
15	5	"Zamana Kharab Hai"	Bhanu Pratap Singh & Dominique Cerejo	Manoj Yadav	Hindi	August 4, 2012
15	5	"Jo Chahenge Voh Karenge"	Benny Dayal	Manoj Yadav	Hindi	August 4, 2012
15	5	"Man Patang Mast Malang"	Mahalakshmi Iyer, Dominique Cerejo, Banjyotsana Borgohain & Sharodee Borah	Ibson Baruah & Manoj Yadav	Assamese & Hindi	August 4, 2012
15	5	"Dil Loche"	Divya Kumar & Mahalakshmi Iyer	Manoj Yadav	Hindi	August 4, 2012
Produced & composed by Karsh Kale
16	6	"Peekaboo"	Apeksha Dandekar, Benny Dayal & Mandeep Sethi	Karsh Kale, Tapan Raj, Mandeep Sethi & Traditional Indian	Hindi & English	August 11, 2012
16	6	"Kajar Bina Kare"	Salim Merchant	Ustad Sultan Khan	Hindi	August 11, 2012
16	6	"Shedding Skin"	Apeksha Dandekar, Karsh Kale, Monali Thakur, Shilpa Rao & Shruti Pathak	Swanand Kirkire & Karsh Kale	Hindi & English	August 11, 2012
16	6	"Glorious"	Benny Dayal, Mandeep Sethi & Shruti Pathak	Shellee & Mandeep Sethi	Arabic, English & Punjabi	August 11, 2012
16	6	"Dil Cheez"	Monali Thakur	Shahryar & Monali Thakur	Hindi & English	August 11, 2012
16	6	"Hallelujah"	Karsh Kale & Shilpa Rao	Karsh Kale, Leonard Cohen & Traditional	Hindi & English	August 11, 2012
Produced & composed by Shantanu Moitra
17	7	"Vandiyil"	La Pongal & Usha Uthup	Traditional Indian & Hari	Tamil	August 18, 2012
17	7	"Khwajababa"	Bonnie Chakraborty & Pranav Biswas	Traditional Indian	Bengali	August 18, 2012
17	7	"Kir Leh Rawh"	Kaushiki Chakrabarty & Mami Varte	David Lalliansanga	Mizo	August 18, 2012
17	7	"Lagi Lagi"	Kaushiki Chakrabarty & Swanand Kirkire	Swanand Kirkire	Hindi	August 18, 2012
17	7	"Pinjra"	Bonnie Chakraborty & Swanand Kirkire	Swanand Kirkire	Hindi	August 18, 2012
Produced & composed by Agam, Dhruv Sangari, Hari & Sukhmani, Jalebee Cartel, Papon and Shilpa Rao
18	8	"Malhar Jam"	Agam	Raag	Hindustani	August 25, 2012
18	8	"Haq Maula"	Dhruv Sangari	Salim Chishti	Hindi	August 25, 2012
18	8	"Dum Dum"	Shilpa Rao & Arun Daga	Shellee	Punjabi	August 25, 2012
18	8	"Tokari"	Papon & Sugandha Garg	Traditional Indian	Assamese	August 25, 2012
18	8	"Challa"	Hari & Sukhmani	Traditional Indian	Punjabi	August 25, 2012
18	8	"Khuda Wohi Hai"	Zila Khan	Traditional Indian	Punjabi	August 25, 2012
