= Ghalib Shiraz Dhalla =

American writer

- Ghalib Shiraz Dhalla
- Born: 5 June 1978 (age 48); Mombasa, Kenya
- Occupation: Writer/producer/director
- Website: ghalibdhalla.com

Ghalib Shiraz Dhalla (born June 5, 1978) is an American writer. He is known for his novel Ode to Lata published in 2002, that was adapted to a film in 2008 under the title The Ode. He has also published the novel The Two Krishnas in 2011, which was released as The Exiles in India.

== Early life ==
Dhalla's great-grandparents were Ismailis who immigrated to Kenya from India. An only child, he was mostly raised by his mother's parents in Mombasa. He decided that he wanted to be a writer when he was five years old. The same year, his father was murdered, and his mother returned to Mombasa to be with her son.

== Career ==
At 13 years old, he published his first article on infertility in a national magazine VIVA.

An excerpt from Ode to Lata was featured in the award-winning anthology Contours of the Heart: South Asians Map North America (Rutgers), which went on to win the 18th Annual American Book Award. The Los Angeles Times Book Review hailed Dhalla's debut as "an achievement" (Sunday, 24 March 2002) and Christopher Rice called it "a rare, great novel" (book jacket). Ode to Lata is reported to be the first South Asian gay novel ever to be reviewed by The Los Angeles Times and to be excerpted by Genre Magazine.

Ode to Lata was adapted for a motion picture, The Ode starring Sachin Bhatt, Wilson Cruz, and Sakina Jaffrey. Dhalla wrote, co-directed and produced the film. The Ode premiered at the Outfest Film Festival on 17 July 2008 to a sold-out audience.

Some of Dhalla's influences are Dorothy Parker, Andrew Holleran, Ruth Prawer Jhabvala and the poetry of Rumi.

In January 2011, Dhalla wrote, directed and produced the film Embrace starring Rebecca Hazlewood, Ajay Mehta and Randy Ryan. Embrace is the first dramatisation of the 2008 Mumbai terror attacks on record.

== In popular culture ==
- East Indian in heritage and a passionate activist, Dhalla co-founded the South Asian program for the Asian Pacific AIDS Intervention Team (APAIT) which provides prevention, health and social services, community leadership and advocacy to over 10,000 individuals in Southern California. He was also one of the founding members of SATRANG, a support group for LGBT South Asians in Los Angeles.
- In June 2007, Dhalla was listed as one of the Top 21 Tastemakers and "Most Important Movers and Shakers" in America by Genre Magazine.
- In August 2007, Dhalla was listed as one of the "Top 25 People Who Make Us Melt – Angelenos Who Redefine What's Hot" by Frontiers Magazine.
- In March 2008, Dhalla was included in Anokhi Magazine's "Sexy & Successful 2008" roster.
- In 2008, the film The Ode was released. The film directed by Nilanjan Neil Lahiri starring Sachin Bhatt, Wilson Cruz and Sakina Jaffrey was based on his book Ode to Lata.
- Dhalla joined the prestigious Humanitas Prize organisation in 2009 as a Reader for excellence in TV and Film scripts for the 35th Humanitas Prize. *On 29 August 2009 Dhalla was showcased at the Lincoln Center for the Performing Arts in New York with the headlining event, An Evening with Ghalib Shiraz Dhalla where he had the opportunity to map the journey of his semi-autobiographical novel, Ode to Lata to screen and celebrate his body of work. The event was thrown by Engendered, an arts and human rights organisation aimed at creating awareness of gender and sexuality.
- In April 2011, Dhalla was invited to be the subject and guest of the prestigious Master's Tea at Yale University.

== Works ==
Novels

- Ode to Lata – Novel (Really Great Books, 2002)
- The Two Krishnas – Novel (Magnus Books, 9/11) Published as The Exiles (HarperCollins India 2011)

Short stories

- A – short story, Love, West Hollywood anthology (2008)

Films (screenwriter)

- The Ode – Screenplay (2007)
- Embrace – Writer/Director/Producer (Post-Production)
- Abandon – Original Screenplay (Development)

Films (producer)

- The Ode – Associate Producer (2007)

== Notes and references ==
- The Los Angeles Times Book Review of Ode to Lata
- Indulge Magazine
