= Akshat Verma =

Indian filmmaker

- Born: 1972 (age 53–54); Delhi, India
- Occupations: Screenwriter; producer; director; songwriter
- Years active: 2008–Present

Akshat Verma is an Indian screenwriter, producer, director and songwriter.

== Career ==
Verma wrote and directed the feature Kaalakaandi (2018), which starred Saif Ali Khan. His previous film, Delhi Belly (2011), was produced by Aamir Khan and won multiple awards for its writing. Verma also wrote the lyrics for several songs on the film's soundtrack.

He wrote, directed and produced the critically acclaimed short film Mama's Boys in 2016, which provided a modern take on the epic Mahabharat.

Verma also wrote the film The Ode (2008), directed by Nilanjan Neil Lahiri and starring Sachin Bhatt, Wilson Cruz and Sakina Jaffrey. The film is an adaptation of the novel Ode to Lata by Ghalib Shiraz Dhalla.

== Discography ==
Title	Year	Artist	Album	Notes
"Bhaag D.K. Bose"	2011	Ram Sampath	Delhi Belly	Co-written with Amitabh Bhattacharya
"Jaa Chudail"	2011	Ram Sampath	Delhi Belly	Co-written with Amitabh Bhattacharya
"Nakkaddwaley Disco, Udhaarwaley Khisko"	2011	Ram Sampath	Delhi Belly	Co-written with Munna Dhiman
"I Hate You (Like I Love You)"	2011	Ram Sampath	Delhi Belly	Co-written with Ram Sampath

== Filmography ==
=== Short films ===
Year	Title	Director	Screenwriter
2016	Mama's Boy	Yes	Yes

=== Feature films ===
Year	Title	Director	Screenwriter	Producer
2008	The Ode		Yes	
2011	Delhi Belly	Associate	Yes	
2018	Kaalakaandi	Yes	Yes	Yes

=== Television ===
Year	Title	Credit
2025	The Ba***ds of Bollywood	Executive producer

== Awards and nominations ==
Year	Film	Award	Category	Result	Ref.
2012	Delhi Belly	Filmfare Awards	Best Screenplay	Won	
2012	Delhi Belly	Star Screen Awards	Best Story	Won	
2012	Delhi Belly	Star Screen Awards	Best Screenplay	Won	
