= Coke Studio @ MTV season 1 =

Season of television series

Coke Studio @ MTV
- Season 1
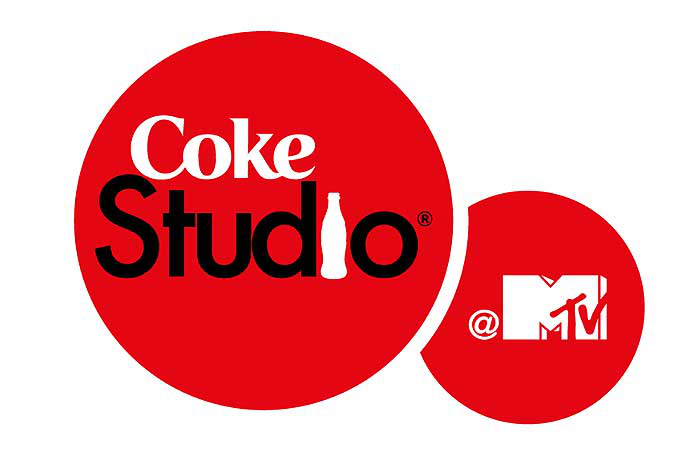
- Starring: Vocalists
- No. of episodes: 10

Release
- Original network: MTV India; YouTube
- Original release: June 17 – August 19, 2011

Season chronology
- Next → Season 2

The first season of the Indian music television series, Coke Studio @ MTV, ran from June 17, 2011, to August 19, 2011. The season featured nine regular episodes, culminating in a special "Best of Coke Studio @ MTV Season 1" episode.

== Origins & Format ==
Coke Studio's journey began in Brazil in 2007. It started as a music project that brought together different Brazilian artists and blended their unique styles. The concept arrived in Pakistan in 2008 through a collaboration between Nadeem Zaman, Coca-Cola's Marketing Head, joined forces with Rohail Hyatt, a former member of the band Vital Signs. Together, they launched the Pakistani version of the show. The first season premiered in June 2008. Initially featuring a live audience, the show later transitioned to a closed studio format, which has remained consistent throughout the series.

Coke Studio @ MTV stays true to the franchise's core concept by pairing established and upcoming artists for unique performances alongside a house band and additional musicians. The recorded performances, available on streaming platforms, showcase both the lead singers and the entire ensemble. Close-up shots during recording capture the energy and artistry of these collaborations.

== Artists ==
The list of performers features both popular and traditional musicians hailing from various parts of India.

=== Vocalists ===
- Advaita
- Akriti Kakkar
- Benny Dayal
- Bombay Jayashri
- Bondo
- Chinna Ponnu
- Divya Lewis
- Harshdeep Kaur
- KK
- Kailash Kher
- Khagen Gogoi
- Mathangi Rajshekhar
- Mausam Gogoi
- Megha Dalton
- Mustafa Bros
- Pankhi Dutta
- Papon
- Parthiv Gohil
- Raghupati Dixit
- Ramya Iyer
- Richa Sharma
- Sabri Brothers
- Sanjeev Thomas
- Saurav Moni
- Shaan
- Shafqat Amanat Ali
- Shankar Mahadevan
- Shruti Pathak
- Sunidhi Chauhan
- Suzzane D'Mello
- Tochi Raina
- Ustad Rashid Khan
- Wadali Brothers

== Episodes ==
The season was helmed by producer Leslee Lewis. Each hour-long episode served as a platform for innovative artistic pairings. These pairings brought together established traditions like Carnatic and Hindustani classical music with the vibrant sounds of up-and-coming artists. The program further enriched the viewing experience by showcasing reimagined Bollywood classics alongside one-of-a-kind collaborations created specifically for the show.

No. overall	No. in season	Song Title	Singer(s)	Lyricist(s)	Language(s)	Original release date
Episode 1
1	1	"Bichua"	Mousam & Sunidhi Chauhan	Shailendra	Assamese	June 17, 2011
1	1	"Chadhta Suraj"	K.K & Sabri Brothers	Aziz Nazan	Urdu	June 17, 2011
1	1	"Hoo"	Harshdeep Kaur	Sultan Bahu	Punjabi	June 17, 2011
1	1	"O Majhi Re"	Saurav Moni & Shaan	Gulzar	Bengali	June 17, 2011
1	1	"Tip Top"	Khagen Gogoi & Shankar Mahadevan	Traditional Indian & Shanta Shelke	Assamese & Marathi	June 17, 2011
1	1	"Vethalai"	Chinnaponnu & Kailash Kher	Chinnaponnu & Kailash Kher	Tamil & Hindi	June 17, 2011
1	1	"Yaar Basainda"	Mathangi Rajshekar & Tochi Raina	Saint Thyagaraja & Vinay Kochar	Punjabi	June 17, 2011
Episode 2
2	2	"Allah Hi Rehem"	Shankar Mahadevan	Niranjan Iyengar	Hindi	June 24, 2011
2	2	"Dheere Dheere"	Megha Sriram Dalton	Pandit Chandrashekhar Mishra	Hindi	June 24, 2011
2	2	"Jiya Laage Na"	Akriti Kakkar & Shankar Mahadevan	Rajesh Johri	Hindi	June 24, 2011
2	2	"Meherma Ve"	Akriti Kakkar & Shankar Mahadevan	Rani Malik	Punjabi	June 24, 2011
2	2	"Path Kai Pore Hoi"	Khagen Gogoi	Traditional Indian	Assamese	June 24, 2011
Episode 3
3	3	"Chitthiye (Henna)"	Sunidhi Chauhan & Wadali brothers	Ravindra Jain & Naqsh Lyallpuri	Hindi & Punjabi	July 1, 2011
3	3	"Jhakki Dil"	Sunidhi Chauhan, Mousam, Divya & Lesle Lewis	Afshan Ahmed	Hindi	July 1, 2011
3	3	"Kadiyan Aa Mil Jaye Yaar"	Wadali Brothers, Mousam Gogoi & Bondo	Traditional Indian	Punjabi	July 1, 2011
3	3	"Maula Maula / Angel"	Divya, Qadir, Murtuza & Rabani	Sarah McLachlan	Urdu & English	July 1, 2011
3	3	"Tu Mane Ya Na Mane"	Wadali Brothers	R.P. Deewana	Punjabi	July 1, 2011
Episode 4
4	4	"Dilruba"	Kailash Kher	Kailash Kher	Hindi	July 8, 2011
4	4	"Indian Jaadu"	Chinna Ponnu & Sanjeev Thomas	Sameer & Sanjeev T	Hindi, Tamil & English	July 8, 2011
4	4	"Pak Pak (Bihu Naam)"	Papon	Traditional Indian	Assamese	July 8, 2011
4	4	"Piya Ghar Aavenge"	Kailash Kher	Kailash Kher	Hindi	July 8, 2011
4	4	"Tere Naam"	Chinna Ponnu, Kailash Kher, Papon, Sanjeev Thomas, Shruti Pathak & Lesle Lewis	Chinna Ponnu & Victor Mukherjee	Tamil & Hindi	July 8, 2011
4	4	"Vethalai"	Chinna Ponnu & Kailash Kher	Traditional Indian & Kailash Kher	Tamil & Hindi	July 8, 2011
Episode 5
5	5	"Aaj Koi Jogee Aave"	Richa Sharma & Ustad Rashid Khan	Traditional Indian	Punjabi	July 15, 2013
5	5	"Aao Na Gale Lagao Na"	Parthiv Gohil & Divya Lewis	Majrooh Sultanpuri	Hindi	July 15, 2013
5	5	"Aesian Nighawan / Paluke Bangara"	Bombay Jayashri & Richa Sharma	Anand Raaj Anand, Bhadrachala Ramdas & Noor Jehan	Punjabi & Telugu	July 15, 2013
5	5	"Hey Bhagwan"	Raghu Dixit	Raghu Dixit	Assamese	July 15, 2013
5	5	"Katyayini"	Bombay Jayashri & Ustad Rashid Khan	A verse from Bhishma Parva	Hindi	July 15, 2013
5	5	"Tere Bin Main"	Bombay Jayashri, Divya Lewis, Lesle Lewis, Parthiv Gohil Raghu Dixit, Richa Sharma & Ustad Rashid Khan	Pinky Poonawala	Hindi	July 15, 2013
Episode 6
6	6	"Aay Hori He"	Pankhi Dutta & Shafqat Amanat Ali Khan	Traditional Indian & Shah Hussain	Assamese & Punjabi	July 22, 2011
6	6	"Akhiyan"	Shafqat Amanat Ali Khan	Fuzön	Urdu	July 22, 2011
6	6	"Ghir Ghir"	Advaita	Advaita	Hindi	July 22, 2011
6	6	"Kya Haal Sunawan"	Shafqat Amanat Ali Khan & Shruti Pathak	Shafqat Amanat Ali Khan	Urdu	July 22, 2011
6	6	"O Aaj Kehne Bhi Na Diya"	Pankhi Dutta	Traditional Indian	Assamese	July 22, 2011
6	6	"Tere Bin Dil Laage Na"	Shafqat Amanat Ali Khan, Advaita, Pankhi Dutta & Shruti Pathak	Manoj Yadav	Urdu	July 22, 2011
Episode 7
7	7	"Aaj Jaane Ki Zidd"	Ramya Iyer & Rupmatii Jolly	Fayyaz Hashmi	Urdu	July 29, 2011
7	7	"Humein To Loot Liya"	Sabri Brothers	Shevan Rizvi	Urdu	July 29, 2011
7	7	"Khilte Hain Gul"	KK, Mathangi Rajshekhar & Sanjay Vidyarthi	Neeraj Shridhar	Hindi	July 29, 2011
7	7	"Tu Aashiqui Hai"	KK	Vishal Dadlani	Hindi	July 29, 2011
7	7	"Tu Hai Yahaan"	KK, Sabri Brothers, Mathangi Rajshekhar, Sanjay Vidyarthi & Lesle Lewis	Prashant Ingole	Hindi	July 29, 2011
Episode 8
8	8	"Jab Se Tere Naina"	Shaan	Sameer	Hindi	August 5, 2011
8	8	"Heiyo Re Heiyo"	Saurav Mandal	Bhatiali	Bengali	August 5, 2011
8	8	"Tum Jo Mil Gaye Ho"	Shaan & Harshdeep Kaur	Kaifi Azmi	Urdu	August 5, 2011
8	8	"Sumbaran Mandal"	Nandesh Umap	Indian Folk	Marathi	August 5, 2011
Episode 9
9	9	"Aaja Sapne Saja Ja"	Kavita Seth & Lesle Lewis	Rajesh Johri & Bharat Bhushan Pant	Hindi	August 12, 2011
9	9	"Coke Studio @ MTV Theme music"	Lesle Lewis	Lesle Lewis	Instrumental	August 12, 2011
9	9	"Kanchi Re"	Benny Dayal & Suzanne D'Mello	Anand Bakshi	Hindi	August 12, 2011
9	9	"Rama Rama Krishna Krishna"	Lesle Lewis & Others	Rajesh Johri	Hindi	August 12, 2011
9	9	"Sunder Balma"	Colonial Cousins & Yachna	Lesle Lewis	Hindi & English	August 12, 2011
9	9	"Udhe Udhe"	Nandesh Umap	Vitthal Umap	Marathi	August 12, 2011
Episode 10: Best of Coke Studio @ MTV season 1
10	10	"Aesian Nighawan / Paluke Bangara"	Bombay Jayashri & Richa Sharma	Anand Raaj Anand, Bhadrachala Ramdas & Noor Jehan	Punjabi & Telugu	August 19, 2011
10	10	"Allah Hi Rehem"	Shankar Mahadevan	Niranjan Iyengar	Hindi	August 19, 2011
10	10	"Bihu Naam (Pak Pak)"	Papon	Traditional Indian	Assamese	August 19, 2011
10	10	"Hey Bhagwan"	Raghu Dixit	Raghu Dixit	Hindi	August 19, 2011
10	10	"Ghir Ghir"	Advaita	Advaita	Hindi	August 19, 2011
10	10	"Tu Mane Ya Na Mane"	Wadali Brothers	R.P. Deewana	Punjabi	August 19, 2011
