= Screen Award for Best Screenplay =

Annual film award in India

The winners of the Screen Awards for Best Screenplay are listed below:

Year	Screenplay writer/s	Film	Ref.
1995	Sooraj Barjatya	Hum Aapke Hain Koun..!	
1996	Rajesh Kaul, Praful Parikh	Haqeeqat	
1997	Robin Bhatt	Raja Hindustani	
1998	J. P. Dutta	Border	
1999	Saurabh Shukla, Anurag Kashyap	Satya	
2000	Sanjay Leela Bhansali, Kenneth Philips	Hum Dil De Chuke Sanam	
2001	Honey Irani, Ravi Kapoor	Kaho Naa... Pyaar Hai	
2002	Ashutosh Gowarikar, Kumar Dave, Sanjay Dayma	Lagaan	
2003	Jaideep Sahni	Company	
2004	Karan Johar	Kal Ho Naa Ho	
2005	Pooja Ladha Surti	Ek Hasina Thi	
2006	Sanjay Leela Bhansali	Black	
2007	Rensil D'Silva, Rakeysh Omprakash Mehra	Rang De Basanti	
2008	Anurag Basu	Life In A... Metro	
2009	Shiraz Ahmed	Race	
2010	Abhijat Joshi, Rajkumar Hirani, Vidhu Vinod Chopra	3 Idiots	
2011	Anjum Rajabali, Prakash Jha	Raajneeti	
2012	Akshat Verma	Delhi Belly	
2013	Sanjay Chouhan, Tigmanshu Dhulia	Paan Singh Tomar	
2014	Hansal Mehta, Apurva Asrani	Shahid	
2015	Sandeep A. Varma	Manjunath	
2016	Vishal Bhardwaj	Talvar	
2017	Saiwyn Quadras	Neerja	
2018	Sriram Raghavan, Pooja Ladha Surti, Hemanth Rao, Arijit Biswas, Yogesh Chandekar	Andhadhun	
2019	Anubhav Sinha & Gaurav Solanki	Article 15	

== See also ==
- Bollywood
- Cinema of India
- Screen Awards
