= MILI (singer-songwriter) =

- Born: Mili Nair; 7 April
- Origin: India
- Genres: Pop, Rock, Jazz, Inde, Playback singer, Bollywood, Original Soundtracks, Film Music
- Occupations: Composer, Producer, Singer, Songwriter, Recording Artist,
- Years active: 2009 - (Present)
- Labels: Apostrophe Music, Sony Music India T-Series
- Publisher: BMI
- Website: www.miliofficial.com

MILI, professionally known as Mili Nair (born 7 April), is an Indian singer, composer, and producer. She released the single “Elephant,” a collaboration with Joe Satriani, becoming one of the first artist from India to collaborate with the legendary guitarist. Prior to this she released her debut album, Written In The Stars, featuring acclaimed musicians like Vinnie Colaiuta, Michael Landau. She has also worked with leading Indian composers including Amit Trivedi and A. R. Rahman

== Biography ==
=== Early life ===
MILI was born in Mumbai and finished her schooling in Pune. Although born in Mumbai, she is a Malayali with her family roots in both Kerala and Malaysia. She pursued her college education at Mount Carmel College, Bangalore, earning a bachelor's degree in Journalism, English Literature, and Psychology.

Mili's journey into music began at an early age. She completed her grade examinations in Western classical voice with Trinity College London and the Associated Board of the Royal Schools of Music (ABRSM) and performed as a soprano soloist with professional choral groups across India.

At just 16, she began performing live professionally with rock and jazz bands.

=== Album: Written in the Stars ===
Mili released her first album in English Written in the Stars in which she has composed all ten songs on the album and has collaborated with veteran musicians Vinnie Colaiuta, Michael Landau, James Genus and George Whitty. The album was launched with the first video Dream Like A Skylark on YouTube. Written in the Stars was recorded and produced in Los Angeles, California and released under the label Apostrophe Music.

The music video for the song Fooling and New Day was filmed in Budapest, Hungary and Stockholm, Sweden and was broadcast on VH1.

=== Single: Keep The Hope Alive! ===
Mili released her first single in English "Keep The Hope Alive!” on 10 July 2020, which aims at keeping our spirits up, as the whole world is fighting against the pandemic.

=== Single: Elephant ===
Written, composed and arranged by MILI, Elephant marks a notable milestone, with MILI becoming the first artist from India to have Joe Satriani perform on her composition, making it a significant moment for the Indian music landscape.

Elephant features Joe Satriani on Guitars, Vinnie Colaiuta on drums, James Genus on Bass, Jeff Babko on keys and produced by Hamesh.

=== Playback Singing & Coke Studio (India) ===
A.R. Rahman gave MILI her first break in film music with the Tamil song Keda Kari in Raavanan and Maham Maye in the Telugu film Komaram Puli. Her most recent release with Rahman is Parakka Seivaai from the Tamil film Ambikapathy (Tamil version of Bollywood film Raanjhana).

MILI went on to collaborate with composer Amit Trivedi on the Hindi film Kai Po Che!, lending her voice to the track Meethi Boliyaan. Meethi Boliyaan earned MILI award nominations from the Indian music industry. She later joined Trivedi on his national concert tours.

MILI also collaborated with director Mahesh Bhatt, performing the title song for the film Mr. X, composed by Jeet Gannguli. Additionally, she worked with composer Harris Jayaraj, delivering the Tamil song Rettai Kathirein from the film Maattrraan.

Her performances on the TV series Coke Studio@MTV Season 2 gained her further recognition.

== Discography ==
=== Albums ===
==== Written in the Stars : track listing ====
All songs written and composed by MILI.

Release: 15 December 2017

No:	Song name	Time
1.	Good Morning	4:11
2.	Had To Be You	5:01
3.	Dream Like A Skylark	4:17
4.	Written in the Stars	5:10
5.	Got An Eye	3:23
6.	Longing	4:42
7.	New Day	4:09
8.	Is It Something	4:30
9.	Inside Out	4:33
10.	Fooling	4:36

Personnel

- MILI – Vocals
- Vinnie Colaiuta – Drums
- Michael Landau - Guitars
- James Genus - Bass
- George Whitty - Piano

Also appearing

- Bill Churchville – Trumpet
- Alejandro Carballo - Trombone
- Terry Landry - Tenor and Barritone Saxophone

Mixed by: Helik Hadar

Mastered By: Gavin Lurssen and Reuben Cohen at Lurssen Masterig

Composition and lyrics by MILI.

Produced by Hamesh

=== Singles ===
1. Keep The Hope Alive! (Acoustic): Date of release July 10, 2026.

2. Elephant: MILI, Joe Satriani, Vinnie Colaiuta & Jeff Babko: Date of release May 1, 2026.

=== Feature films ===
Film	Song name	Language	Composer
Mr. X	Mr. X Title Song - You Can Call Me X - Mahesh Bhatt	Hindi	Jeet Gannguli
Kai Po Che!	Meethi Boliyaan	Hindi	Amit Trivedi
Ambikapathy	Parakka Seivaai	Tamil	A.R. Rahman
Shaadi Ke Side Effects	Tumse Pyar Ho Gaya	Hindi	Pritam
Poojai	Ippadiye	Tamil	Yuvan Shankar Raja
Nanbenda	Nee Sunno Moono	Tamil	Harris Jayaraj
Nerungi Vaa Muthamidathe	Hey Suttrum	Tamil	Madley Blues
Maalai Nerathu Mayakkam	Ennodu	Tamil	Amrit Rao
Raavanan	Keda Kari	Tamil	A.R. Rahman
Puli	Maham Maye	Telugu	A.R. Rahman
Maattrraan	Rettai Kathire	English	Harris Jayaraj
Vanakkam Chennai	Oh Penne Penne (Movie Version)	Tamil	Anirudh Ravichander
Kalakalappu	Angelina	English	Vijay Ebenezer
Urumi	Movie Theme	Malayalam	Deepak Dev
Veera Parampare	Ambarada	Kannnada	Narayan .S.
Aidondla Aidu	Neragi	Kannada	Ouseppachan

=== Coke Studio at MTV India ===
Season	Song name	Composer/ producer	Lyricists	Language	Singers
Season 2	Yatra	Amit Trivedi	Swanand Kirkire	Hindi	Mili Nair, Shriram Iyer
Season 2	Badari Badariyan	Amit Trivedi	Kausar Munir	Hindi	Mili Nair, Mame Khan

== Awards and nominations ==
Year	Award	Film/ song	Title
2013	GIMA Awards	Film: Kai Po Che! / Song: Meethi Boliyan	Best Debut Bollywood – Nominated
2013	GIMA Awards	Film: Kai Po Che! / Song: Meethi Boliyan	Best Duet Bollywood – Nominated
2014	Mirchi Music Awards	Film: Kai Po Che! / Song: Meethi Boliyan	Upcoming Singer (Female) Bollywood – Nominated
