= Claire in Motion =

- Theatrical release poster
- Directed by: Annie J. Howell; Lisa Robinson
- Written by: Annie J. Howell; Lisa Robinson
- Produced by: Annie J. Howell; Lisa Robinson
- Starring: Betsy Brandt; Chris Beetem; Zev Haworth; Anna Margaret Hollyman; Sakina Jaffrey
- Cinematography: Andreas Burgess
- Edited by: Jim Isler
- Music by: Xander Duell
- Production company: Sacha Pictures
- Distributed by: Breaking Glass Pictures
- Release dates: March 15, 2016 (SXSW); January 13, 2017 (United States)
- Running time: 84 minutes
- Country: United States
- Language: English

Claire in Motion is a 2016 American drama film written and directed by Annie J. Howell and Lisa Robinson. The film stars Betsy Brandt, Chris Beetem, Zev Haworth, Anna Margaret Hollyman and Sakina Jaffrey. The film was released on January 13, 2017, by Breaking Glass Pictures.

== Cast ==
- Betsy Brandt as Claire
- Chris Beetem as Paul
- Zev Haworth as Connor
- Anna Margaret Hollyman as Allison
- Sakina Jaffrey as Maya

== Release ==
The film premiered at South by Southwest on March 15, 2016. It was released on January 13, 2017, by Breaking Glass Pictures.

== Critical Reception ==
Claire in Motion received 63% approval from 19 reviews on Rotten Tomatoes.
