= Dog Eat Dog (2001 film) =

2001 film by Moody Shoaibi

- Theatrical release poster
- Directed by: Moody Shoaibi
- Written by: Moody Shoaibi; Mark Tonderai
- Produced by: Peter Bennett-Jones; Amanda Davis; Hanno Huth; Paul Webster
- Starring: Melanie Blatt; Gary Kemp; Crunski; Mark Tonderai; Alan Davies; John Thomson
- Cinematography: John Daly
- Edited by: Luke Dunkley
- Music by: Mark Hinton Stewart
- Production companies: FilmFour Productions; Senator Film Produktion; Shona Productions; Tiger Aspect Productions
- Distributed by: FilmFour Distribution (United Kingdom); Senator Film (Germany)
- Release dates: 8 October 2001 (Warsaw International Film Festival); 7 December 2001 (United Kingdom)
- Running time: 93 minutes
- Countries: United Kingdom; Germany
- Language: English

Dog Eat Dog is a 2001 British sex comedy film, directed by Moody Shoaibi and written by Moody Shoaibi and Mark Tonderai.

== Plot ==
Four friends, Rooster, CJ, Jess and Chang, dream of making it as DJs but first they need cash – lots of it, and fast. Their lack of funds is compounded by problems ranging from small (cheating girlfriends, mothers in sleazy movies) to large (the towering presence of Tunde, the local porn king). They come up with various schemes, each more harebrained than the last—stealing library books, breaking and entering, dognapping—all with a spectacular lack of success. And into the bargain, they have fallen foul of drugs baron Jesus, whose slogan is "You've gotta have faith in Jesus".

== Cast ==
- Mark Tonderai as Rooster
- Nathan Constance as Jess
- David Oyelowo as CJ
- Melanie Blatt as Kelly, the ex-girlfriend
- Crunski as Chang
- Alan Davies as Phil
- Gary Kemp as Jesus
- Steve Toussaint as Darcy
- Ricky Gervais as Bouncer
- Rebecca Hazlewood as Mina
- Stewart Wright as Eastwood
- Dilys Laye as Edith Scarman
- Daniel Kitson as Bus Driver

== Reception ==
The film received mixed reviews. According to Time Out, "[Shoaibi and Tonderai's] debut feature basically resembles an extended sitcom" and "The film's gross-out humour actually smacks of the Farrelly Brothers' sloppy seconds, right down to the compulsory semen gag." Jamie Russell, writing for the BBC, gave the film two out of five stars, concluding that "Its heart is in the right place, but there's no escaping the fact that this is lightweight stuff."
