= Mooralala Marwada =

Moorala Marwada
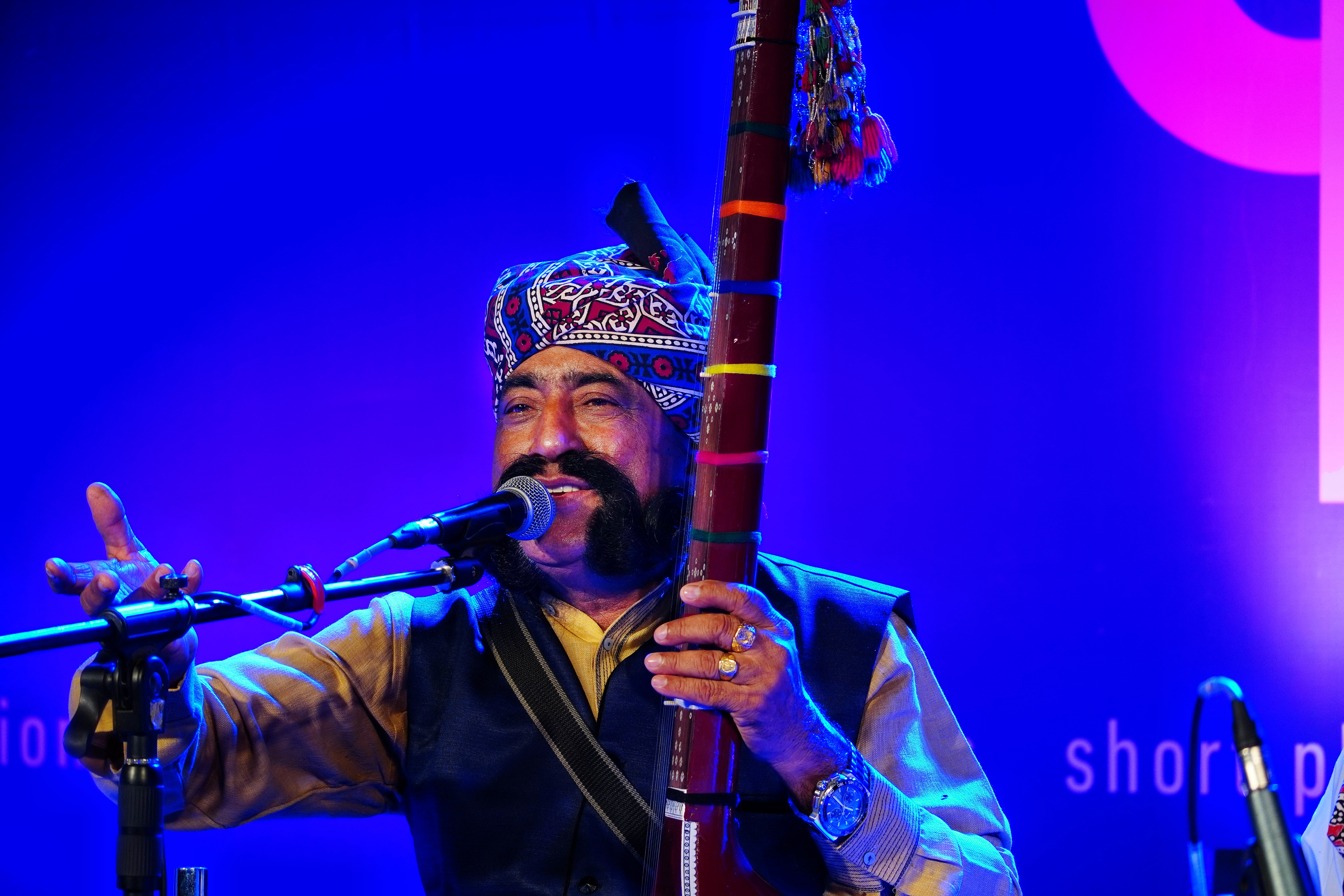
- Mooralala Marwada performing in 2021

Background information
- Born: 1955 or 1956 (age 69–70)
- Origin: Kutch, Gujarat, India
- Genre: Sufi folk
- Occupation: Singer
- Years active: 1963-present

Moorala Marwada (born 1955) is a Sufi folk singer from the Janana village of the Kutch District, Gujarat, India. Marwada hails from 11th-generation of Meghwal singers of the village in Gujarat's Kutch district. He sings the poetry of Kabir, Mirabai, Ravidas and others. Mooralala sings in the Kafi form of music that has evolved and been adopted by the Hindu singers of Shah Abdul Latif Bhittai.

== Early life ==
Growing up he used to accompany his father and grandfather to satsangs, and started singing at the age of eight. Today he travels to various cities across India with his group. Currently, his musical group consists of his nephews, Sukhdev and Dekhabhai and his grandson Maheshbhai.

He has also been featured in the Kabir Project and sang "Vari Jaun" in Coke Studio (Season 2, 2012), which got him considerable recognition. In 2019, he featured in Gujarati-language period drama film Hellaro as a playback singer. and in 2021 Hindi film Rashmi Rocket, where he sang, Rann Ma Kutchh with music by Amit Trivedi.

In 2025, he collaborated with Kathak dancer Sanjukta Sinha for choreography at the annual World Sufi Music Festival, Jahan-e-Khusrau.
