= Kissing Cousins (film) =

- Directed by: Amyn Kaderali
- Written by: Amyn Kaderali
- Produced by: Manish Goyal; Rahul Haria; Amyn Kaderali
- Starring: Samrat Chakrabarti; Rebecca Hazlewood; Lauren Stamile
- Cinematography: Alison Kelly
- Edited by: Nadia Fugazza
- Music by: Timo Chen
- Release date: March 11, 2008
- Running time: 98 minutes
- Country: United States
- Language: English

Kissing Cousins is a 2008 American romantic comedy film starring Samrat Chakrabarti and Rebecca Hazlewood. This film is about a relationship terminator who falls for his cousin.

== Plot ==
Amir is an Indian American professional heartbreaker (people hire him to break up with their boyfriend/girlfriend when they don't want to do it themselves). At Amir's 30th birthday party, his childhood friend Charlie announces that he is getting married, but he and his fiancé decide they don't want Amir to be the best man because of his bad "relationship karma". This depresses him, as do the relationship advice books he receives as gifts. Amir goes to visit his family for Thanksgiving and meets Zara, his attractive British cousin, who he hasn't seen in twenty years. Amir's mother persuades him to take Zara back to her home in Southern California, since she is in the United States traveling.

Zara decides to help Amir's relationship karma by claiming she is his girlfriend. While she is visiting, Zara also helps Amir be more compassionate when terminating people's relationships. After a Christmas party where they drink too much and are forced to kiss under the mistletoe, they go back to Amir's apartment and have drunken sex, which they regret, but Amir thinks that he has fallen in love with Zara. Zara doesn't feel the same. When they go back to Amir's family home for Christmas, it is revealed that Zara ran away from her British boyfriend after he proposed at the Grand Canyon, and her boyfriend is staying with Amir's family while he looks for her. After Christmas, Amir returns to Los Angeles alone. At Charlie's wedding on New Year's Eve, Amir & Zara (who stops by on her way to the airport) reveal to Amir's friends that they are cousins. At the reception after the wedding, Amir and Bridget, the single woman in their group of friends, realize they could be more than friends and decide to start dating.

== Cast ==
- Samrat Chakrabarti as Amir
- Rebecca Hazlewood as Zara
- Jaleel White as Antwone
- Rachael C. Smith as Bridget
- P.J. Byrne as Tucker
- Nikki McCauley as Tina
- Amy Rider as Toyoka
- Lauren Stamile as Liza
- Gerry Bednob as Mr. K
- Brian Lynn Graham as "Spider", The Biker
- Elina Madison as Stacy, The Meter Maid
