= Chetan Shashital =

Indian actor, voice actor and singer (born 1968)

- चेतन शाशितल
- Born: 1968 (age 57–58); Mumbai, India
- Other names: Chetan Sashital; The Big C
- Occupations: Actor, voice actor, singer

Chetan Shashital (Konkani: चेतन शाशितल Cētana Śāśitala), born 1968 in Mumbai, India, also known as Chetan Sashital or The Big C for his expertise in the voice-acting industry) is an Indian actor, voice actor and singer, who is mostly recognized for working in the dubbing industry. Chetan received Newsmakers Achievers Awards in 2021.

== Dubbing career ==
He has been giving voices to animation, for local Indian productions. He has also performed Hindi-dubbing for foreign productions, such as Baloo the Bear from Talespin and The Jungle Book 2 and also for Genie from Disney's Aladdin, that was dubbed and aired on Disney Channel India in 2005.

Shashital has also dubbed for Bollywood actors. He has performed as a dubbing artist for Bollywood actor, Amitabh Bachchan, as well as for such other Bollywood actors as Salman Khan, Sunny Deol, Sanjay Dutt and Dharmendra.

== Dubbing roles ==
=== Animated series ===
Program title	Original voice(s)	Character(s)	Dub language	Original language	Episodes	Original airdate	Dubbed airdate	Notes
Talespin	Ed Gilbert †	Baloo von Bruinwald XIII	Hindi	English	56	5/5/1990- 8 August 1991		Aired on DD National, Disney Channel India and Toon Disney India dubbed in Hindi, much later after the original airing.
The Simpsons	Dan Castellaneta	Homer Simpson	Hindi	English	523	12/17/1989-Current	Unknown	
Aladdin	Dan Castellaneta	Genie	Hindi	English	86	5 September 1994 – 25 November 1995	????	Aired on DD National and many other Hindi Cartoon Channels in India.

=== Live action films ===
==== Indian films ====
Film title	Actor	Character(s)	Dub language	Original language	Original year release	Dub year release	Notes
Aag Ka Gola	Sunny Deol	Vikram Singh; Shankar "Shaka"	Hindi	Hindi	1989	1989	Chetan was called in to dub the dialogues during post-production because of the dissatisfaction of the director with the lines spoken by the actors. In some cases, the actors were unable to convey their lines properly due to temporary health problems, despite the movies being shot in Hindi.
Biwi No.1	Salman Khan	Prem	Hindi	Hindi	1999	1999	Chetan was called in to dub the dialogues during post-production because of the dissatisfaction of the director with the lines spoken by the actors. In some cases, the actors were unable to convey their lines properly due to temporary health problems, despite the movies being shot in Hindi.
Andolan	Sanjay Dutt	Adarsh Pradhan	Hindi	Hindi	1995	1995	
Dabangg 2	Prakash Raj	Thakur Bachcha Lal Singh	Hindi	Hindi	2012		
Parampara	Anupam Kher	Gora Shankar	Hindi	Hindi	1993		
Thackeray	Nawazuddin Siddiqui	Bal Keshav Thackeray	Hindi	Marathi	2018	2018	

==== Hollywood films ====
Film title	Actor	Character(s)	Dub language	Original language	Original year release	Dub year release	Notes
Star Wars	David Prowse (Portrayer); James Earl Jones (Voice)	Darth Vader	Hindi	English	1977		
The Empire Strikes Back	David Prowse (Portrayer); James Earl Jones (Voice)	Darth Vader	Hindi	English	1980		
Return of the Jedi	David Prowse (Portrayer); James Earl Jones (Voice)	Darth; Vader / Anakin Skywalker	Hindi	English	1983		
The Rock	Sean Connery		English	Hindi	1997		
Face/Off	John Travolta	Sean Archer	English	Hindi	1997	1997	Performed along with Viraj Adhav who voiced Nicolas Cage as Castor Troy.
The Punisher (1989 film)	Barry Otto	Shake	English	Hindi	1989	Unknown	

=== Animated films ===
Film title	Original voice	Character	Dub language	Original language	Original Release	Dub Release	Notes
Aladdin	Robin Williams † (Speaking and Singing)	Genie (Speaking and Singing)	Hindi	English	1992	1994	Dubbed by Vijay Cine Studio.
The Return of Jafar	Dan Castellaneta	Genie	Hindi	English	1994		
Aladdin and the King of Thieves	Robin Williams †	Genie	Hindi	English	1996		
The Jungle Book	Phil Harris	Baloo the Bear	Hindi	English	1967	2002	Aired on Disney Channel India.
The Jungle Book 2	John Goodman	Baloo the Bear	Hindi	English	2003	2003	

== Discography ==
=== Hindi ===
Year	Movie	Song(s)	Co-singer(s)	Composer	Lyricist
2004	Kyun! Ho Gaya Na...	"No No!"	Dominique Cerejo, Kunal Ganjawala, Loy Mendonsa, Shankar Mahadevan	Shankar-Ehsaan-Loy	Javed Akhtar
2004	Kyun! Ho Gaya Na...	"Baat Samjha Karo"	Javed Ali, Shankar Mahadevan	Shankar-Ehsaan-Loy	Javed Akhtar
2011	Delhi Belly	"Saigal Blues"	-	Ram Sampath	Ram Sampath, Shashital

== See also ==
- Dubbing (filmmaking)
- List of Indian Dubbing Artists
