= The Ode =

- Original film poster
- Directed by: Nilanjan Neil Lahiri
- Screenplay by: Ghalib Shiraz Dhalla; Akshat Verma
- Based on: Ode to Lata by Ghalib Shiraz Dhalla
- Produced by: Ratna Maity; Bharat Shah (exec. producer)
- Starring: Sachin Bhatt; Wilson Cruz; Sakina Jaffrey
- Cinematography: Brandon Cox
- Edited by: Nilanjan Neil Lahiri
- Music by: Karsh Kale
- Release date: 2008
- Running time: 105 minutes
- Countries: India; United States
- Language: English
- Budget: $10 million

The Ode is a 2008 English-language American-Indian drama film directed by Nilanjan Neil Lahiri and starring Sachin Bhatt, Wilson Cruz and Sakina Jaffrey. The film is an adaptation of the novel, Ode to Lata by Ghalib Shiraz Dhalla. The biopic was shot on location in Kenya and in Los Angeles and produced by Ratna Maity, with Bharat Shah as executive producer. The film marks the acting debut of Indian actress, Lakshmi Manchu.

== Ode to Lata ==
The film is an adaptation of the book Ode to Lata written by Ghalib Shiraz Dhalla. It was the debut novel for the author published in 2002. It provides an insight into an often maligned realm of LGBT life through its focus on racial diversity on the scene.

== Synopsis ==
The storyline spans two generations of Indians. There is the doomed but passionate love story of Parin (Sakina Jaffrey) and Shiraz (Anil Kumar). This is intertwined with the life of their gay son Ali (Sachin Bhatt) who discovers that the past is always present no matter how far you run from it. Ali flees to Hollywood, away from his overprotective mother and the memories of his father's violent death.

A successful banker by day, at night Ali's life unravels in a blur of alcohol, drugs, and sex as he grapples with love, loss and ultimately, forgiveness. When his mother comes to Los Angeles to visit Ali in a last-ditch attempt to bring him back home and change his ways, the trapdoors of the past are flung open. Through Ali's struggle to break free and in his obsessive relationship with Richard (Diego Serrano), we glimpse into a troubled past he cannot escape and which threatens to destroy him unless he finds peace with his mother.

== Cast ==
- Sachin Bhatt as Ali
- Wilson Cruz as Adrian
- Sakina Jaffrey as Parin
- Parvesh Cheena as Salman
- Diego Serrano as Richard
- Rebecca Hazlewood as Young Parin
- Philip Anthony-Rodriguez as Nelson
- Lakshmi Manchu as Najma
- Enrique Almeida as Cholo (1)
- Noel Gugliemi as Cholo (2)
- Ajay Mehta as Mr. Surani
- Anoush NeVart as Mrs. Surani (credited as Anna NeVart)
- Yasmine Delawari as Guli
- Anil Kumar as Shiraz

== Production ==
According to Variety, The Ode was Bharat Shah's first big-budget production after his release from prison in 2003.

== Release ==
The Ode premiered at the Outfest Film Festival on 17 July 2008. The Hindustan Times noted that "The interesting thing about Ode to Lata is that the producer has no intention of releasing it in India - it is being designed as a purely international film meant solely for global distribution."

== Reception ==
Ian Shaikh of Asia Pacific Arts reviewing the film at Outfest wrote that "the movie is surprisingly dark in color and mood, resembling more the city lights and shadows of Gotham City than the color and energy from a Pride parade. The realism of its characters sometimes faltered because of the film's reluctance to depart from the norm -- aka the 'discovered-you-cheating-now-I'm-walking-away' shot -- but this is made up, to some degree, by the performances".
