= Rebecca Hazlewood =

British actress

Rebecca Jane Hazlewood
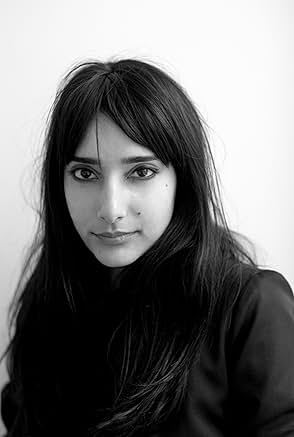
- Hazlewood circa 2010s
- Born: Wales, UK
- Occupation: Actress
- Years active: 1998-present

Rebecca Jane Hazlewood is a British actress of Anglo-Indian descent with mixed Sikh, Afghan, and Iranian heritage. She is known for her role as Asha in the NBC sitcom Outsourced (2010–2011), described by Variety as a "superb" breakout performance, recurring as Kamilah Al-Jamil in the NBC comedy The Good Place (2016–2020), and portraying Stephanie Kercher in the Hulu miniseries The Twisted Tale of Amanda Knox (2025).

Her earlier UK work includes the role of transgender prisoner Arun Parmar in the ITV drama Bad Girls (2005–2006), one of the early transgender characters on UK primetime television.

== Early life ==
Hazlewood was born in Wales and grew up in the Black Country, West Midlands. She attended King Edward VI College in Stourbridge at age 16, studying theatre and English. She earned a BA in English Literature with honours from Bretton Hall College, affiliated with the University of Leeds, where she devised and toured original plays, including performing in the surrealist play Stand Up Mike Tarbuck at the Edinburgh Festival.

== Career ==
Hazlewood began her career after being scouted to model on BBC's The Clothes Show while at school. She transitioned to acting with early British television roles, including Janey in Liverpool One (1998), Talia Ahmed in Second Sight (2000) alongside Clive Owen, and a regular role as Beena Shah in the ITV soap opera Crossroads (2001–2003).

In 2001, she appeared in the Film4 feature Dog Eat Dog with David Oyelowo, Gary Kemp, and Ricky Gervais. She later played Arun Parmar in Bad Girls for series 7 and 8 (2005–2006).

After relocating to the United States, she trained in method acting with Tony Greco in Los Angeles (having previously studied the Meisner technique in London). She took leading and supporting roles in independent films such as Kissing Cousins (2008) as Zara and The Ode (2008) as young Parin, and appeared in recurring TV parts including Jaspreet in NBC's ER (2008). Her breakthrough in US television came as Asha in NBC's Outsourced (2010–2011).

Subsequent credits include Nalini in ABC's Lost (2009), recurring as Sia Clements in the BBC soap Doctors (2010), Dr. Mara Keaton in ABC's Grey's Anatomy (2012), Dr. Reva Khatri in USA Network's White Collar (2013), Agnes in HBO's Room 104 (2020), and Reena in Apple TV+'s Little America (2022). She recurred as Kamilah Al-Jamil in multiple episodes across all four seasons of NBC's The Good Place (2016–2020). Film appearances include Zoe in the A24/Ridley Scott-produced Equals (2015), Monie in Chee and T (2016), a cameo as herself in Woody Harrelson's Lost in London (2017), Rachel in Lost Transmissions (2019), and Debbie in The Beekeeper (2024) starring Jason Statham. Most recently, she portrayed Stephanie Kercher in the Hulu miniseries The Twisted Tale of Amanda Knox (2025; 4 episodes).

== Filmography ==
=== Film ===
Year	Title	Role	Notes
2001	Dog Eat Dog	Mina	
2005	The Extra	Girlfriend in Cinema	
2008	Kissing Cousins	Zara	Lead role
2008	The Ode	Young Parin	
2012	Embrace	Meeta	Short film; co-producer
2014	Teacher in a Box	Ms Rossi	Short film
2015	Equals	Zoe	
2016	Chee and T	Monie	
2017	Lost in London	Herself	Cameo
2017	The Rush Chairman	Party Girl	
2019	Lost Transmissions	Rachel	
2024	The Beekeeper	Debbie	

=== Television ===
Year	Title	Role	Notes
1998	Liverpool One	Janey	Episode: #1.5
2000	Second Sight	Talia Ahmed	2 episodes
2001	Is Harry on the Boat?	Girl with Brad	TV movie
2001–2003	Crossroads	Beena Shah	Series regular
2004	Doctors	Meena Baker	Episode: #5.203
2005–2006	Bad Girls	Arun Parmar	Series regular (series 7-8)
2008	ER	Jaspreet	2 episodes
2008	Las dos caras de Jano		TV movie
2009	Lost	Nalini	Episode: "Some Like It Hoth"
2010	Doctors	Sia Clements	Recurring, 5 episodes
2010–2011	Outsourced	Asha	Series regular (22 episodes)
2012	Grey's Anatomy	Dr. Mara Keaton	Episode: "One Step Too Far"
2013	White Collar	Dr. Reva Khatri	Episode: "Digging Deeper"
2016–2020	The Good Place	Kamilah Al-Jamil	Recurring, multiple episodes across all four seasons
2020	Room 104	Agnes	Episode: "The Last Man"
2022	Little America	Reena	Episode appearance (Apple TV+)
2025	The Twisted Tale of Amanda Knox	Stephanie Kercher	4 episodes (Hulu)
