= Khagen Gogoi =

Indian politician (died 2019)

Assam Legislative Assembly
- In office 1972–1978
- Preceded by: R. Konwar
- Succeeded by: Budha Barua
- Constituency: Mahmora

Personal details
- Born: 1926/27
- Died: 5 March 2019 (aged 92)
- Party: Bharatiya Janata Party

Khagen Gogoi was an Indian politician from Assam who was affiliated to Bharatiya Janata Party (BJP). He was elected as a member of Assam Legislative Assembly as an Indian National Congress candidate from Mahmora in 1972. He joined the BJP in 1996. He died on 5 March 2019 at the age of 92.
