= Shazneen Arethna =

Indian playback singer

- Birth name: Shazneen Arethna
- Born: India
- Genres: Rock; filmi
- Occupation: Playback singer
- Years active: 2007–present

Shazneen Arethna is an Indian playback singer. She is known for her voice as she sang the song "I Hate You (Like I Love You)", penned by Akshat Verma, Ram Sampath in the movie Delhi Belly. She had sung the opening theme for the television series Sunaina. During the Mumbai's Rock festival, Independence Rock Festival 2010, she had shared the stage with stalwart musicians "rock" like Dhruv Ghanekar, Warren Mendonsa, Loy Mendonsa, Ehsaan Noorani, Farhad Wadia (the festival's founder and promoter), Ravi Iyer, Chandresh Kudwa and Sidd Coutto. Recently in 2021, she had sung "Call Me Cruella" from Disney's Cruella in Hindi and Tamil languages.

== Accolades ==
Award Ceremony	Category	Recipient	Result	Ref.(s)
4th Mirchi Music Awards	Upcoming Female Vocalist of The Year	"I Hate You (Like I Love You)" from Delhi Belly	Nominated	
