= Sakina Jaffrey =

American actress (born 1962)

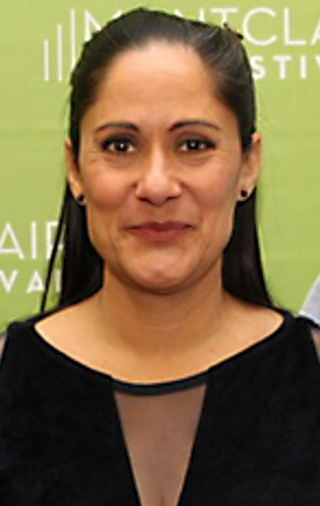
- Jaffrey in 2014
- Born: February 14, 1962 (age 64); New York City, U.S.
- Education: Vassar College (AB)
- Occupation: Actress
- Years active: 1979–present
- Spouse: Francis Wilkinson
- Children: 2
- Parents: Saeed Jaffrey (father); Madhur Jaffrey (mother)
- Relatives: Kiara Advani (cousin); Raghu Raj Bahadur (cousin)

Sakina Jaffrey (born February 14, 1962) is an American actress. Jaffrey may be best known for portraying Linda Vasquez in the Netflix original series House of Cards, and Denise Christopher in the NBC series Timeless.

== Early life ==
Jaffrey was born in New York City, the youngest daughter of Indian-born parents, actress and food and travel writer Madhur Jaffrey, and actor Saeed Jaffrey. Her parents divorced when she was three years old, and she grew up estranged from her father, who subsequently moved to the United Kingdom.

She grew up in the Greenwich Village section of Manhattan, where she attended PS 41. She later attended the Nightingale-Bamford School on the Upper East Side.

Jaffrey picked up her love of Chinese culture from her elder sister, Meera. She graduated from Vassar College in 1984, with a major in Chinese Language and Literature, originally planning to be a translator before she became an actress.

== Career ==
At the age of 17, Jaffrey made her professional acting debut in the play Marie and Bruce by Wallace Shawn at the Public Theatre in New York City.

She appeared with her father in the film Masala (1991) and with her mother in The Perfect Murder (1988). In 2002, she appeared in The Truth About Charlie starring Mark Wahlberg. Her children Cassius and Jamila appear with her in Raising Helen (2004). Jaffrey starred in the English-language American-Indian drama film The Ode (2008).

She starred as Linda Vasquez, the White House Chief of Staff, in the Netflix series House of Cards (2013). In 2014, it was announced that she would be appearing in the second season of Fox's television series Sleepy Hollow as Leena Reyes, the new sheriff.

From 2016 to 2018, she had a starring role in the NBC television series Timeless as Homeland Security Agent Denise Christopher.

She also starred as Malini Soni in The Meyerowitz Stories, a 2017 comedy-drama film directed by Noah Baumbach and costarring Dustin Hoffman and Adam Sandler.

== Personal life ==
Jaffrey lives in New York with her husband, Francis Wilkinson, a journalist, and their two children, Cassius and Jamila.

== Acting credits ==
=== Film ===
Year	Title	Role	Notes
1988	The Perfect Murder	Neena Lal	
1989	Slaves of New York	Willfredo's receptionist	
1991	Masala	Rita Solanki	
1995	The Indian in the Cupboard	Lucy	
1996	Daylight	Kit's passenger #1	
1999	Chutney Popcorn	Sarita	
1999	Cotton Mary	Rosie	
2001	Revolution No. 9	Dr. Ray	
2001	The Mystic Masseur	Suruj Mooma	
2002	The Guru	Young Woman in Dance Class	
2002	The Truth About Charlie	Sylvia	
2003	Ash Tuesday	June	
2003	American Made	—N/a	Short film
2004	Raising Helen	Nilma Prasad	
2004	The Manchurian Candidate	Mysterious Arabic Woman	
2006	Hiding Divya	Dr. Sharma	
2007	Where God Left His Shoes	Doctor	
2007	Dharini	Kiran	Short film
2007	Waking Dreams	Rajani	
2007	The Nanny Diaries	Sima	
2007	Before the Devil Knows You're Dead	Manager	
2008	Definitely, Maybe	School Mom	
2008	The Toe Tactic	Lacticia Utt	
2008	The Understudy	Nurse	
2008	The Ode	Parin	
2009	Company Retreat	Sareeta	
2010	Nevermind Nirvana	Dr. Sarita Matto	Television film
2011	Breakaway	Livleen Singh	
2012	The Domino Effect	Serena	
2013	The Necklace	Sunita	Short film
2016	Claire in Motion	Maya	
2017	The Meyerowitz Stories	Dr. Soni	
2018	Red Sparrow	Trish Forsyth	
2018	Behold My Heart	Jane	
2018	The Equalizer 2	Fatima	
2019	Late Night	Mrs. Patel	
2020	Soul	Doctor	Voice role
2021	The Hating Game	Helen	
2026	Super Troopers 3	TBA	Post-production

=== Television ===
Year	Title	Role	Notes
2000	Law & Order	Dr. Balikrishan	Episode: "Endurance"
2003–2005	Third Watch	Dr. Hickman	16 episodes
2004	Sex and the City	Rama Patel	Episode: "Splat!"
2004	Law & Order	Roya Koutal	Episode: "Caviar Emptor"
2006	Heroes	Mrs. Suresh	2 episodes
2007	What Goes On	Asha	Episode: "Blue"
2007	Law & Order: Special Victims Unit	Geeta Chanoor	Episode: "Outsider"
2011	Blue Bloods	Mrs. Demir	Episode: "Thanksgiving"
2012	Girls	Gynecologist	Episode: "Vagina Panic"
2013–2018	House of Cards	Linda Vasquez	19 episodes
2014–2015	Sleepy Hollow	Sheriff Leena Reyes	5 episodes
2014–2018	Madam Secretary	Chondita Samant	2 episodes
2015–2017	Mr. Robot	Antara Nayar	7 episodes
2015	Halal in the Family	Fatima Qu'osby	4 episodes
2015–2016	The Mindy Project	Sonu Lahiri	6 episodes
2016	Blindspot	Susan Albright	Episode: "Cease Forcing Enemy"
2016–2018	Timeless	Agent Denise Christopher	26 episodes
2017	The Problem with Apu	Herself	Documentary film
2018	Homeland	Dr. Meyer	3 episodes
2019	American Gods	Mama-Ji	4 episodes
2019	Lost in Space	Captain Kamal	5 episodes
2020	Defending Jacob	Lynn Canavan	7 episodes
2021–2022	Snowpiercer	Dr. Headwood	16 episodes
2022	Ms. Marvel	Auntie Shirin	Episode: "Destined"
2022–2023	Billions	Daevisha ‘Dave’ Mahar	20 episodes
2024	Ghosts	Champa Arondekar	Episodes: "A Very Arondekar Christmas," parts 1 and 2
2025	Goosebumps	Ramona	Recurring (season 2)
2025	Deli Boys	Seema	
2026-present	Avatar: Seven Havens	Agam (voice)	Main role

==== Theatre ====
Year	Production	Role	Venue	Notes	Ref.
1979	Marie and Bruce		Public Theatre	Professional acting debut	
1988	George Washington Slept Here		Apple Corps Theatre		
1988	Phaedra Brittanica		CSC		
2009	The River Crosses Rivers: Short Plays by Women of Color		Castillo Theatre	Production of New Federal Theatre	

== Awards and nominations ==
Year	Association	Category	Nominated work	Result
2015	Screen Actors Guild Awards	Outstanding Performance by an Ensemble in a Drama Series	House of Cards	Nominated
