= Shriram Iyer =

Indian singer

Shriram Iyer is an Indian singer who has provided the music for the Bollywood film, Iqbal and also sung the opening theme song for the Zee TV show, Sa Re Ga Ma Pa Challenge 2007. He is lead singer of the fusion band "OM The Fusion Band".

== Life ==
Apart from his livewire performances, Shriram has done playback singing for Iqbal, Udaan and No One Killed Jessica.

He has to his credit the success of his album "OM" - a fusion album launched by TIMES MUSIC, which was critically acclaimed the world over and was nominated for the Sangeet awards held at San Francisco.

Shriram has also composed and sung title tracks for serials namely SHABAASH INDIA for which he has won the RAPA AWARD, Titan Antakshari, HERO HONDA Sa Re Ga Ma Pa, L'il Champs and Rock-N-Roll Family for ZEE TV and also Zinda dil for Zee NEXT.

He has performed for corporates like Reliance, HDFC Bank, Kurl On, Dr Reddys, Standard Chartered Bank, ICICI and for government festivals, Common Wealth Games, IPL, etc.

Shriram has also performed with playback singers such as Mahalakshmi Iyer, Kunal Ganjawala, Shreya Ghoshal, Hariharan, Shaan, Kailash Kher, Jaaved Ali, Sowmya Rao, Naresh Iyer and great music directors Shankar-Ehsaan-Loy; and has recently collaborated with clarinetist and YouTube sensation Shankar Tucker for the solo 'Piya'.

Shriram has also performed for ATOS Pune utsav 2013.

== Discography ==
- Dilli Dilli: No One Killed Jessica
- Aali Re: No One Killed Jessica
- Dheem Dheem Tana: Shor in the City
- Maula: Iqbal
- Wali Allah: Wali Allah
- Tauba main vyah karke pachhtaya: Shaadi ke side effects
