= Bhaag D.K. Bose =

"Bhaag D.K. Bose, Aandhi Aayi"

Song by Ram Sampath

from the album Delhi Belly
- Language: Hindi
- Released: 27 May 2011
- Genre: Punk rock; Post-grunge
- Length: 4:02
- Composer: Ram Sampath
- Lyricist: Amitabh Bhattacharya
- Producer: Ram Sampath

Bhaag D.K. Bose, Aandhi Aayi (transl. Run D.K. Bose, The Storm's Here) is a Hindi song composed and sung by Ram Sampath, with lyrics penned by Amitabh Bhattacharya for soundtrack album of the film Delhi Belly. The promotional video of the song, featuring Imran Khan, Vir Das and Kunaal Roy Kapur, has been directed by Sajid Shaikh.

== Overview ==
In the song's lyrics, 'D.K. Bose' appears to be a Bengali name but it is also a double entendre or juxtaposition for a Hindi swear word "bhosadi ke" (from the cunt) when spoken backward (Bose D. K.). The Central Board of Film Certification got into trouble after approving the song in one go even though a section of the people were angry at the obscenity of the lyrics.

== Lyrics ==
Original Lyrics

डैडी मुझसे बोला तू गलती है मेरी
तुझपे जिंदगानी गिल्टि है मेरी
साबुन की शक्ल में
बेटा, तू तो निकला केवल झाग, झाग, झाग, भाग!
भाग-भाग, भाग-भाग, भाग-भाग, भाग-भाग
ओ, बाई गॉड लग गई, क्या से क्या हूआ?
देखा तो कटोरा, झाँका तो कुवां
पिड्डी जेसा छुआ, दम पकड़ा तो निकला काला नाग, नाग, नाग, भाग!
भाग-भाग, डीके बोस, डीके बोस, डीके बोस
भाग-भाग, डीके बोस, डीके भाग
भाग-भाग, डीके बोस, डीके बोस, डीके बोस
भाग-भाग, डीके बोस, डीके भाग
आंधी आई, आंधी आई, आंधी आई, आंधी आई
भाग-भाग, डीके बोस, डीके भाग
भाग-भाग, डीके बोस, डीके बोस, डीके बोस, आंधी आई हाँ!
है-है-है, है-है-है
है, है, है, है, है, है, है
किसने किसको लूटा, किसका माथा कैसे फूटा?
क्या पता? भैया we don't have a clue
इतना ही पता है, आगे दौड़े तो भला है
पीछे तो एक राक्षश फाड़े मुँह
इक आंधी आई है, सन्देशा लायी है, यह!

भाग-भाग, डीके बोस, डीके बोस, डीके बोस
भाग-भाग, डीके बोस, डीके भाग
भाग-भाग, डीके बोस, डीके बोस, डीके बोस
भाग-भाग, डीके बोस, डीके भाग
आंधी आई, आंधी आई, आंधी आई, आंधी आई
भाग-भाग, डीके बोस, डीके भाग
भाग-भाग, डीके बोस, डीके बोस, डीके बोस
आंधी आई, हाँ!
भाग-भाग, भाग-भाग
भाग-भाग, भाग-भाग
है-है-है-है-है-है, है-है-है-है-है-है
हम तो हैं कबूतर, दो पाइए का एक स्कूटर
जिन्दगी, जो ढकिलो तो चले
अरे किस्मत की है कड़कि, रोटी कपड़ा और लड़की
तीनों ही पापड़ पेलो तो मिले
यह भेजा गार्डेन है, और टैंशन मालि है, यह
मन का तानपुरा, फ्रस्ट्रेशन में छेड़े एक ही राग, राग, राग, भाग!
भाग-भाग, डीके बोस, डीके बोस, डीके बोस
भाग-भाग, डीके बोस, डीके भाग
भाग-भाग, डीके बोस, डीके बोस, डीके बोस
भाग-भाग, डीके बोस, डीके भाग
आंधी आई, आंधी आई, आंधी आई, आंधी आई
भाग-भाग, डीके बोस, डीके भाग
भाग-भाग, डीके बोस, डीके बोस, डीके बोस
आंधी आई, हाँ!
डैडी मुझसे बोला तू गलती है मेरी
तुझपे जिंदगानी गिल्टि है मेरी
साबुन की शक्ल में, बेटा तू तो निकला केवल झाग, झाग, झाग, भाग!
भाग-भाग, डीके बोस, डीके बोस, डीके बोस
भाग-भाग, डीके बोस, डीके भाग
भाग-भाग, डीके बोस, डीके बोस, डीके बोस
भाग-भाग, डीके बोस, डीके भाग
आंधी आई, आंधी आई, आंधी आई, आंधी आई
भाग-भाग, डीके बोस, डीके भाग
भाग-भाग, डीके बोस, डीके बोस, डीके बोस
आंधी आई, हाँ!

Transliteration

ḍaiḍī mujhse bolā tū galtī hai merī
tujhpe jindagānī gilṭi hai merī
sābun kī śakla mẽ
beṭā, tū to niklā keval jhāg, jhāg, jhāg, bhāg!
bhāg-bhāg, bhāg-bhāg, bhāg-bhāg, bhāg-bhāg
o, bāī gŏḍ lag gaī, kyā se kyā hūā?
dekhā to kaṭorā, jhā̃kā to kuvā̃
piḍḍī jesā chuā, dam pakṛā to niklā kālā nāg, nāg, nāg, bhāg!
bhāg-bhāg, ḍīke bos, ḍīke bos, ḍīke bos
bhāg-bhāg, ḍīke bos, ḍīke bhāg
bhāg-bhāg, ḍīke bos, ḍīke bos, ḍīke bos
bhāg-bhāg, ḍīke bos, ḍīke bhāg
āndhī āī, āndhī āī, āndhī āī, āndhī āī
bhāg-bhāg, ḍīke bos, ḍīke bhāg
bhāg-bhāg, ḍīke bos, ḍīke bos, ḍīke bos, āndhī āī hā̃!
hai-hai-hai, hai-hai-hai
hai, hai, hai, hai, hai, hai, hai
kisne kisko lūṭā, kiskā māthā kaise phūṭā?
kyā patā? bhaiyā vī ḍonṭ haiv a klū
itnā hī patā hai, āge dauṛe to bhalā hai
pīche to ek rākṣaś phāṛe mũh
ik āndhī āī hai, sandeśā lāyī hai, yah!

bhāg-bhāg, ḍīke bos, ḍīke bos, ḍīke bos
bhāg-bhāg, ḍīke bos, ḍīke bhāg
bhāg-bhāg, ḍīke bos, ḍīke bos, ḍīke bos
bhāg-bhāg, ḍīke bos, ḍīke bhāg
āndhī āī, āndhī āī, āndhī āī, āndhī āī
bhāg-bhāg, ḍīke bos, ḍīke bhāg
bhāg-bhāg, ḍīke bos, ḍīke bos, ḍīke bos
āndhī āī, hā̃!
bhāg-bhāg, bhāg-bhāg
bhāg-bhāg, bhāg-bhāg
hai-hai-hai-hai-hai-hai, hai-hai-hai-hai-hai-hai
ham to ha͠i kabūtar, do pāie kā ek skūṭar
jindagī, jo ḍhakilo to cale
are kismat kī hai kaṛki, roṭī kapṛā aur laṛkī
tīnõ hī pāpaṛ pelo to mile
yah bhejā gārḍen hai, aur ṭa͠iśan māli hai, yah
man kā tānpurā, phrasṭreśan mẽ cheṛe ek hī rāg, rāg, rāg, bhāg!
bhāg-bhāg, ḍīke bos, ḍīke bos, ḍīke bos
bhāg-bhāg, ḍīke bos, ḍīke bhāg
bhāg-bhāg, ḍīke bos, ḍīke bos, ḍīke bos
bhāg-bhāg, ḍīke bos, ḍīke bhāg
āndhī āī, āndhī āī, āndhī āī, āndhī āī
bhāg-bhāg, ḍīke bos, ḍīke bhāg
bhāg-bhāg, ḍīke bos, ḍīke bos, ḍīke bos
āndhī āī, hā̃!
ḍaiḍī mujhse bolā tū galtī hai merī
tujhpe jindgānī gilṭi hai merī
sābun kī śakl mẽ, beṭā tū to niklā keval jhāg, jhāg, jhāg, bhāg!
bhāg-bhāg, ḍīke bos, ḍīke bos, ḍīke bos
bhāg-bhāg, ḍīke bos, ḍīke bhāg
bhāg-bhāg, ḍīke bos, ḍīke bos, ḍīke bos
bhāg-bhāg, ḍīke bos, ḍīke bhāg
āndhī āī, āndhī āī, āndhī āī, āndhī āī
bhāg-bhāg, ḍīke bos, ḍīke bhāg
bhāg-bhāg, ḍīke bos, ḍīke bos, ḍīke bos
āndhī āī, hā̃!

== Accolades ==
Award Ceremony	Category	Recipient	Result	Ref.(s)
4th Mirchi Music Awards	Best Programmer & Arranger of the Year	-	Nominated	
