= Munna Dhiman =

Indian lyricist and scriptwriter

- Born: April 25, 1971 (age 55)
- Occupation: Lyricist
- Years active: 2003–present
- Organization: Bollywood
- Notable work: Delhi Belly (film), Satyamev Jayate (TV series), Fukrey

Gurmeet Singh (born 25 April 1971), changed his name to Munna Dhiman is a Bollywood lyricist and scriptwriter from Chandigarh, India. He has done work for popular Indian films and television programs like Coke Studio, Delhi Belly (film), Satyamev Jayate (TV series), Fukrey and Bhootnath Returns etc. He is a son of bus conductor in Punjab Roadways, lives in Chandigarh- Burail and completed studies from a Hindi medium school in Chandigarh. He went to Mumbai and came back in 2003 when Bollywood music composer Vishal Bharadwaj promised him in an email that "One day, we will work together," and after this he sat back in Chandigarh and waited for a response Vishal Bharadwaj, before going to Mumbai he was writing poetry or songs for the theatre groups in Chandigarh for their plays. Later, Bharadwaj asked him to write three songs for his film Asma 2004 and since then He has done 50 songs for almost 15 movies in last since he came back from Mumbai.

Dhiman has done work with very known faces in Bollywood like Vishal Bharadwaj, Aamir Khan, Sona Mohapatra and Ram Sampath, over the years from his first project with director-lyricist Vishal Bharadwaj he has done work for the films Ramji Londonwaley (2005), U Me Aur Hum (2008), Nishabd (2007), Delhi Belly (2011). Munna was also the part of Coke Studio July 14 episode, as he has written one song Sufiana romantic song Luk da Firda Hai Mere to Laake Yariaan, which was sung by Alisha Bath and Vijay Prakash. For the very first time he did work for Punjabi film 'Nabar' in 2012 and again it was a Sufi song that was sung by a popular Punjabi Sufi singer Barkat Sidhu.
