= Delhi Belly (film) =

2011 Indian film by Abhinay Deo

- Theatrical release poster
- Directed by: Abhinay Deo
- Written by: Akshat Verma
- Produced by: Aamir Khan; Jim Furgele; Kiran Rao; Ronnie Screwvala
- Starring: Imran Khan; Vir Das; Kunaal Roy Kapur; Poorna Jagannathan; Shenaz Treasurywala; Vijay Raaz
- Cinematography: Jason West
- Edited by: Huzefa Lokhandwala
- Music by: Ram Sampath
- Production companies: UTV Motion Pictures; Ferocious Attack Cow; Aamir Khan Productions
- Distributed by: UTV Motion Pictures
- Release date: 1 July 2011
- Running time: 100 minutes
- Country: India
- Languages: English; Hindi
- Budget: ₹ 23 crore
- Box office: ₹ 87.60 crore

Delhi Belly is a 2011 Indian dark comedy film written by Akshat Verma and directed by Abhinay Deo. It stars Imran Khan, Kunaal Roy Kapur, Vir Das, Poorna Jagannathan and Shenaz Treasurywala. It is a Hinglish-language film, with 70% of the dialogue in English and 30% of the dialogue in Hindi. The film is produced by Aamir Khan Productions and UTV Motion Pictures. The theatrical trailer of the film premiered with Aamir Khan's Dhobi Ghat on 21 January 2011 while the film was released on 1 July 2011, along with a Hindi dubbed version. The film was given an 'A' certificate for its profanity, some violence and sexual content and is often dubbed as a modern cult classic. The film was remade in Tamil as Settai.

== Plot ==
The story revolves 3 roommates, journalist Tashi Lhatoo, photographer Nitin Berry and cartoonist Arup Rather, leading an unkempt and debt-ridden life in a shady apartment in Delhi. Tashi's ditzy fiancée, Sonia, is a flight attendant who agrees to deliver a package from Vladimir Pildysh to Rajesh Bhatia a.k.a. Cowboy, without realizing its contents or that Cowboy is a crime boss. Sonia asks Tashi to deliver the package. Tashi, in turn, asks Nitin to do so which he reluctantly agrees. Meanwhile, Nitin has a street food snack, and he photographs his landlord Manish with a prostitute. Nitin starts suffering from diarrhoea on the way as a result of the dirty street food which he ate and is unable to deliver the package. He sends an envelope with the photographs to his landlord to blackmail him. Nitin hands Sonia's package to Arup for delivery to Cowboy, along with a package containing his stool sample for delivery to Nitin's doctor. Arup accidentally mixes up the two bags. Cowboy, furious, tortures Vladimir in his hotel room to find his package.

Tashi is in bed with Sonia when his colleague Menaka calls him on the pretext of work. When he reaches the place, he realizes that it is just a party, and Menaka called him just to have fun. Menaka's ex-husband Rajeev sees them together and punches Tashi in the eye in a fit of jealousy. Tashi retaliates and knocks Rajeev out. As Tashi and Menaka leave, they are chased by a furious Rajeev who tries to shoot at them. The duo barely manages to escape.

Vladimir informs Cowboy that the mix-up must have been caused by Sonia, as she didn't know what she was carrying in the package. Cowboy calls Sonia, informs her about the mix-up, and asks her to give him the address of the person who had delivered the package. When Tashi arrives in his apartment, he walks into Cowboy, who has Arup standing on a stool with a noose around his neck. On hard interrogation, Cowboy discovers the mix-up and realizes that the package must be in Nitin's doctor's clinic.

Nitin gets the package from his doctor's office, wherein Cowboy finds his 30 diamonds hidden inside. Upon recovering his booty, he orders his henchmen to kill the roommates. One of them is about to shoot Tashi when another kicks the stool on which Arup was standing to hang him. Luckily for the roommates, the ceiling of the apartment collapses since it can't take Arup's weight. The cave-in knocks out Cowboy and his men, leaving one with broken arms. Tashi taking away the gun, Arup and Nitin escape with the diamonds and spend the night at Menaka's place. The next day they sell the diamonds to a local jeweller.

As the roommates prepare to get out of town with the money, they get a call from Cowboy, who has kidnapped Sonia. He threatens to kill her if they don't return the diamonds. The trio tries to buy back the diamonds from the jeweller, who demands double the sale amount.

Without the money, Tashi comes up with a plan. Nitin, Arup, Tashi, and Menaka disguise themselves in burqas and rob the jeweller, leaving him the bag of money. They flee in Tashi's car with the police on their tail and go to the hotel where Cowboy is holding Sonia. As they are about to make the exchange with Cowboy, the police arrive at the hotel room, where there is a shootout between the police and Cowboy's gang.

Nitin, Arup, Tashi, Sonia, and Vladimir, who had hit the floor during the gunfight, are left as the only survivors. Menaka, who by now realises that she likes Tashi, is upset to learn about his engagement and walks away from him. Tashi breaks off his engagement to Sonia. Later, it is revealed that Nitin did not return the cash to the jewellery store owner and had kept most of the money for himself (whereupon he abandons blackmailing the landlord). The film ends when Menaka comes to the roommates' apartment to return Tashi's car's hubcap lost while escaping from Rajeev. Tashi jumps into her car through the open window and kisses her passionately.

Producer-actor Aamir Khan is seen dancing in a song and dance performance as the credits start rolling.

== Cast ==
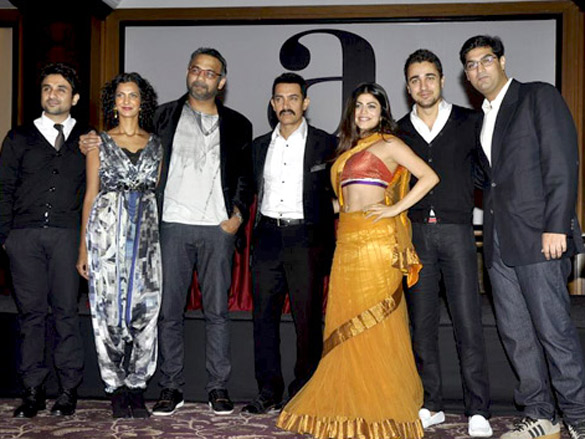
(From left to right) Vir Das, Poorna Jagannathan, Abhinay Deo, Aamir Khan, Shenaz Treasuryvala, Imran Khan, Kunal Roy Kapoor at the film's success bash

- Imran Khan as Tashi Dorjee Lhatoo
- Kunaal Roy Kapur as Nitin Berry
- Vir Das as Arup Sengupta
- Vijay Raaz as Rajesh Bhatia (a.k.a. Cowboy)
- Rahul Singh as Rajeev Khanna (Menaka's ex-husband)
- Poorna Jagannathan as Menaka Vashisht
- Shenaz Treasurywala as Sonia Mehra
- Raju Kher as Zubin Mehra (Sonia's father)
- John Gabriel as Lucky (Cowboy's henchman)
- Lushin Dubey as Mrs. Mehra (Sonia's mother)
- Paresh Ganatra as Manish Chand Jain
- Rahul Pendkalkar as Prateek Jain
- Sanjay Taneja as DIG Phool Chand Jain (Manish's brother)
- Rajendra Sethi as Sudhir Adlakha (the jeweller)
- Pradeep Kabra as Brajesh (Cowboy's henchman)
- Dharmendar Singh as Bunty (Cowboy's henchman)
- Kim Bodnia as Vladimir Pildysh
- Anusha Dhandekar as VJ Sophaya
- Bugs Bhargava as Swapan Bannerjee (Arup's boss)
- Aamir Khan as Disco Fighter (Guest appearance in song "I Hate You (Like I Love You)")

== Production ==
=== Development ===
This film was written by Akshat Verma, a Los Angeles-based writer, who first wrote the screenplay as a part of his Screenwriting programme at UCLA, under the title Say Cheese. Subsequently, he lost his job as a copywriter in the US, around 2005, he revived the script. Akshat had to compile fifteen drafts before the movie was released. It took him more than three years to finish writing the story. He visited Mumbai, along with Jim Furgele, to unsuccessfully pitch the film to various film producers, and eventually left after submitting a draft to Aamir Khan Productions. The script was thrown into a pile of scripts in Aamir Khan's office, where his wife Kiran Rao randomly found it and shared it with him. Aamir then contacted the writer, who was initially hesitant that it might ruin the "clean, family entertainment" tag of Aamir Khan Productions; however, Aamir had produced two A-certificate films before, Peepli Live and Dhobi Ghat.

== Filming ==
Shooting for the film began in August 2008 in Delhi and finished in mid 2009. The film was stuck in editing that led to a 2 year delay. Initially, Aamir was to spearhead the editing but he got busy with his own films.

=== Casting ===
Initially, Ranbir Kapoor and Chitrangada Singh were to star in the film. After both of them backed out, Aamir signed his nephew Imran Khan for the lead role following the tremendous success of his debut film Jaane Tu Ya Jaane Na. Indian comedian Vir Das was also signed to star in the film. According to director Abhinay Deo, "Delhi Belly is an ensemble piece. It's not a film about Imran Khan. He is only one of the several protagonists. There are others whose characters are just as important. There is Kunal Roy Kapoor, Vir Das and Poorna Jagannathan, an Indian actress from LA".

== Release ==
On 3 July 2011, the Government of Nepal banned the screening of the movie citing the reluctance by the cinema halls to remove offensive scenes from the film. However, the film was later cleared for viewing by theatre goers above 16 years. A scene showing one of the protagonists, played by Kunaal Roy Kapur, visiting a brothel, was cut and some expletives in two scenes were muted. The film was selected for being screened in the Harvard Business School and Harvard Kennedy School as a part of the Harvard India Conference 2012. Director Abhinay Deo was invited as a guest.

The theatrical trailer of the film premiered with Aamir Khan's Dhobi Ghat on 21 January 2011 while the film was released on 1 July 2011, along with a Hindi dubbed version.

The film was banned by the Pakistan Central Board of Film Censors for unspecified reasons.

Indiagames also released a mobile video game based on the film.

=== Critical reception ===
The film received critical acclaim. Nikhat Kazmi of the Times of India rated the film with four out of five stars, and said, "All in all, Delhi Belly is a fine example of how the brightest and the boldest, when they pool in their talent, can create a film that is guaranteed to give you your money's worth, even as it re-writes all the moth-balled rules of an ageing industry. Enjoy the experience." Pratim D. Gupta of The Telegraph called Delhi Belly "an insanely funny ensemble comedy" and praised writer Akshat Verma's "original screenplay, which knows the difference between physical comedy and slapstick humour." Taran Adarsh of Bollywood Hungama rated the movie with four and a half stars and wrote: "Eventually, Delhi Belly works big time predominantly for the reason that it's a pioneering motion picture, an incredible film that dares to pierce into an untapped and brand new terrain. The unblemished, racy screenplay coupled with super performances and a chart-busting musical score will make it a winner all the way." Mihir Fadnavis of Daily News and Analysis called the script "hilarious" and "bitingly perceptive" and gave the film four out of five stars, saying "I haven't had this much fun at the movies in a long time". Mathures Paul of The Statesman gave the film four out of five stars, and wrote, "It's a fashionable film for fashionable youth." Raja Sen of Rediff gave the movie three stars out of a possible five, saying "Delhi Belly has a tight, pacy plot which has lots of satisfying little set-ups and pay-offs". Rajeev Masand of CNN-IBN gave the film three and a half out of five stars, saying "Delhi Belly is a filthy comic thriller that works because it's a smartly paced wild-ride". He also praised Vijay Raaz's performance, saying that the villainous role had been "played wonderfully".

The film also received high praise from critics outside India. Lisa Tsering of The Hollywood Reporter called it a "Sexy, filthy and thoroughly entertaining comedy" and that it "marks a welcome shift in contemporary Indian cinema." She however pointed out that Aamir Khan "overstays his welcome" in his cameo at the end of the film, and that "a momentary glimpse would have had more impact." Kevin Thomas of the Los Angeles Times said that "Akshat Verma's script is imaginative and funny, the film's stars are engaging and "Delhi Belly" adds up to pleasing escapist fare." Peter Bradshaw of The Guardian also praised the film, saying that "The sheer daftness and goofiness of this Bollywood comedy-farce makes it likable."

Other reviewers, however, deplored the scatological basis of most of the humour and the hackneyed scenarios in the film. Shubhra Gupta of The Indian Express had this to say in her review: "After a while, the continuous bad tummy rumbles and farts, and the non-stop cussing, wears thin. And please, wearing burqas as a disguise is not the only way you can have characters on the run in the grungier parts of town, even if you overlay the chase with the ultra-clever, super-catchy Bhaag D K Bose ditty. There are, believe us, other ways."

=== Box office ===
The film opened very well at the box office. It grossed ₹360 million (US$3.7 million) in the first week of screening all around India and US$1.6 million overseas. The film grossed ₹550 million (US$5.7 million) in India by the end of its third week, being declared a super hit. Delhi Belly grossed ₹920 million (US$9.6 million) worldwide.

== Remakes ==
Delhi Belly was remade in Tamil as Settai released on 5 April 2013.

== Soundtrack ==
The music of the film was composed by Ram Sampath while the lyrics were penned by Amitabh Bhattacharya, Munna Dhiman, Ram Sampath, Akshat Verma and Chetan Shashital. The song "Bhaag D.K. Bose" created controversy upon its release. 'D K Bose, D K Bose,' juxtaposed and sung at a quick pace forms a popular expletive in North India. Akshat Verma came up with the idea of using the phrase 'D K Bose'. Abhinay Deo and Aamir Khan gave their nod to the song as they felt the catch phrase went with the young and irreverent theme of the film.

== Accolades ==
Ceremony	Category	Recipient	Result
57th Filmfare Awards	Best Film	Delhi Belly	Nominated
57th Filmfare Awards	Best Director	Abhinay Deo	Nominated
57th Filmfare Awards	Best Supporting Actor	Vir Das	Nominated
57th Filmfare Awards	Best Music Director	Ram Sampath	Nominated
57th Filmfare Awards	Best Screenplay	Akshat Verma	Won
57th Filmfare Awards	Best Art Direction	Shashank Tere	Won
57th Filmfare Awards	Best Editing	Huzefa Lokhandwala	Won
18th Colors Screen Awards	Best Film	Delhi Belly	Nominated
18th Colors Screen Awards	Best Director	Abhinay Deo	Nominated
18th Colors Screen Awards	Best Supporting Actor	Kunaal Roy Kapur	Nominated
18th Colors Screen Awards	Best Comedian	Kunaal Roy Kapur	Nominated
18th Colors Screen Awards	Best Comedian	Vijay Raaz	Nominated
18th Colors Screen Awards	Best Supporting Actress	Poorna Jagannathan	Nominated
18th Colors Screen Awards	Best Female Debut	Poorna Jagannathan	Nominated
18th Colors Screen Awards	Best Ensemble Cast	The cast of Delhi Belly	Nominated
18th Colors Screen Awards	Best Music Director	Ram Sampath	Nominated
18th Colors Screen Awards	Best Background Music	Ram Sampath	Nominated
18th Colors Screen Awards	Best Male Playback Singer	Ram Sampath for "Bhaag D.K. Bose"	Nominated
18th Colors Screen Awards	Best Dialogue	Akshat Verma	Nominated
18th Colors Screen Awards	Best Cinematography	Jason West	Nominated
18th Colors Screen Awards	Best Sound Design	Vinod Subramaniam and Dwarak Warrier	Nominated
18th Colors Screen Awards	Best Choreography	Farah Khan for "I Hate You (Like I Love You)"	Nominated
18th Colors Screen Awards	Best Story	Akshat Verma	Won
18th Colors Screen Awards	Best Screenplay	Akshat Verma	Won
18th Colors Screen Awards	Best Editing	Hufeza Lokhandwala	Won
18th Colors Screen Awards	Best Production Design	Shashank Tere	Won
4th Mirchi Music Awards	Upcoming Female Vocalist of The Year	Shazneen Arethna for "I Hate You (Like I Love You)"	Nominated
4th Mirchi Music Awards	Upcoming Lyricist of The Year	Akshat Verma fir "I Hate You (Like I Love You)"	Nominated
4th Mirchi Music Awards	Best Item Song of the Year	"I Hate You (Like I Love You)"	Nominated
4th Mirchi Music Awards	Best Programmer & Arranger of the Year	"Bhaag D.K. Bose"	Nominated
4th Mirchi Music Awards	Best Background Score of the Year	Ram Sampath	Won
